= Dick Rosmini =

- Born: Richard John Rosmini; October 4, 1936; New York City, United States
- Died: September 9, 1995 (aged 58) Los Angeles, California, US
- Genres: Folk, blues, ragtime, roots music
- Occupations: Guitarist, author
- Instruments: Twelve-string guitar, guitar, banjo
- Labels: Elektra, Imperial

Richard John Rosmini (October 4, 1936 – September 9, 1995) was an American guitarist at one time considered the best 12-string guitarist in the world. He was best known for accompanying singers and for his role in the American folk revival of the 1960s.

== Life ==
Dick Rosmini was born in New York City and grew up in Greenwich Village learning guitar and performing in clubs. During the 1960s, he was employed as the main jewelry photographer for Tiffany & Co.

His 1964 album Adventures for 12 String, 6 String and Banjo predates much of John Fahey and Leo Kottke and other American primitive guitarists, which Kottke cited as an early influence. Rosmini was also a noted banjo player. He appeared as a sideman with Bob Gibson at Chicago's Gate of Horn; with Art Podell & Paul Potash at New York's Cafe Wha?; as soloist and singer at Los Angeles' Ash Grove; with Barbara Dane in a concert tour with Bob Newhart; and in association with Pernell Roberts in Bonanza. Rosmini continued his career in music as a sideman on numerous folk albums including those by Bob Gibson, Eric Weissberg, Dave Van Ronk, Ananda Shankar, Hoyt Axton and others before leaving music to pursue a career in photography.

He subsequently taught recording for over a decade at the University of Southern California and had a hand in the evolution of motion picture sound into its present day form. In 1978, he wrote a booklet on multitrack recording called TEAC Multitrack Primer. His constant fight to make audio electronics accessible to musicians led to his developing many of Tascam's multitrack and portable multitrack recorders and mixers. He was a consultant to JBL on the musical instrument transducer K-series 120 and 130. He co-designed JBL studio monitors and participated in their integration into Hollywood's top studios.

He died on September 9, 1995, of amyotrophic lateral sclerosis at the age of 58.

== Discography ==
- 1964: Adventures for 12-String, 6-String and Banjo (Elektra)
- 1969: A Genuine Rosmini (Imperial)
- 1973: Sessions (JBL)
- 1974: Hello People - Home Made with Teac

== Soundtracks ==
- 1976: Original Soundtrack Recording from the Paramount Motion Picture Leadbelly
- 1979: Original Soundtrack Recording from the United Artists Motion Picture The Black Stallion

== With others ==
- 1957: I Come For To Sing, Bob Gibson
- 1958: There's a Meetin' Here Tonight, Bob Gibson
- 1960: Songs Of Earth And Sky, Art and Paul
- 1961: Hangin', Drinkin' And Stuff Art and Paul
- 1961: Van Ronk Sings, Dave Van Ronk
- 1963: Come All Ye Fair And Tender Ladies, Pernell Roberts
- 1964: A Folksinger’s Choice, Theodore Bikel
- 1964: Changes, Modern Folk Quartet
- 1967: Steve Gillette, Steve Gillette
- 1968: Song Cycle, Van Dyke Parks
- 1969: Greatest Hits, Phil Ochs
- 1969: Farewell Aldebaran, Judy Henske & Jerry Yester
- 1969: Bob Gibson, Bob Gibson
- 1969: The Moonstone, Tommy Flanders
- 1969: Sausalito Heliport, Gale Garnett & The Gentle Reign
- 1970: To Be Free, Jackie DeShannon
- 1970: California Stop Over, Johnny Darrell
- 1970: Ananda Shankar, Ananda Shankar
- 1971: Sweet Country Suite, Larry Murray
- 1971: Songs, Paul Parrish
- 1971: Cyrus, Cyrus Faryar
- 1971: Songs, Jackie DeShannon
- 1972: Let's Spend the Night Together, Claudine Longet
- 1972: Malvina, Malvina Reynolds
- 1973: Duelin' Banjo, Doug Dillard
- 1973: Islands, Cyrus Faryar
- 1974: Digby Richards, Digby Richards
- 1974: Richard Ruskin, Rick Ruskin
- 1974: You Don't Need a Reason to Sing, Doug Dillard
- 1975: Microphone Fever, Rick Ruskin
- 1975: Southbound, Hoyt Axton
- 1977: Six String Conspiracy, Rick Ruskin
- 1977: Roadsongs, Hoyt Axton
- 1977: More Rod '77, Rod McKuen
