= Cyrus Faryar =

American singer-songwriter

Cyrus Faryar سیروس فریار
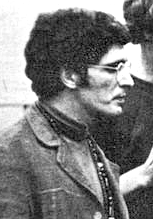
- Faryar in 1965

Background information
- Born: February 26, 1936 (age 90); Tehran, Iran
- Genres: Folk
- Occupations: Musician, songwriter, record producer
- Instruments: Guitar, vocals
- Years active: 1950s–present
- Label: Warner Bros
- Formerly of: Modern Folk Quartet

Cyrus Faryar (Persian: سیروس فریار; born February 26, 1936) is an Iranian-American folk musician, songwriter and record producer.

== Early life and education ==
Cyrus Faryar was born in Tehran, Iran to a family of Persian descent. He and his family lived in England for several years before moving to Hawaii, where he was a childhood friend of folk singer Dave Guard. He attended Punahou School, graduating in 1953. He attended the University of Hawaii in Manoa Valley, but left before obtaining his degree.

== Career ==
After graduating from high school and attending college, he became involved in the entertainment industry, opening the first coffee house in Hawaii. By 1957, Faryar's avant-garde interests led him to establish a "Beat" style coffee house in Honolulu. Faryar's Greensleeves coffee house was, like those popularized first by San Francisco's Beat Generation in the Broadway section of the city, a gathering place for local musicians, poets and writers.

By 1961, Faryar had left Honolulu and established himself in San Diego. Dave Guard then recruited him to join his new group, the Whiskeyhill Singers, who also included Judy Henske. He later moved to Southern California and became active with several groups. When Dave Guard left the Kingston Trio to pursue his interest in early folk music styles, Guard asked Faryar to join his new group, the Whiskeyhill Singers.

After the Whiskeyhill Singers disbanded, Faryar moved to San Diego to perform with other folk musicians. After his San Diego period, Faryar returned to Hawaii, where he helped form the Modern Folk Quartet, and produced two records in his eclectic neo-folk style. Still living in Hawaii, he continues to perform occasionally with his recognizable and distinctive deep baritone voice.

After the Whiskeyhill Singers broke up, Faryar returned to Hawaii and formed a new singing group, the Modern Folk Quartet, with Chip Douglas, Henry Diltz and Jerry Yester, which lasted three years before disbanding in 1966. In 1966 he played acoustic guitar and bouzouki on Fred Neil's eponymous album.

At the Monterey Pop Festival in June 1967, Faryar led a band dubbed the "Group With No Name." Later that year, he collaborated with Mort Garson and synthesizer virtuoso Paul Beaver, providing the narration for the album The Zodiac: Cosmic Sounds, a pioneering psychedelic LP on Elektra Records. In 1968, he performed on Cass Elliot's album Dream a Little Dream.

Faryar released two solo albums as a singer-songwriter in the early 1970s but became better known as a producer, particularly for the Firesign Theatre, and for playing in sessions for Linda Ronstadt and others. He has also continued to record and tour with reformed versions of the Modern Folk Quartet (or Quintet), as well as recording Hawaiian music.

== Discography ==
=== Modern Folk Quartet ===
==== Singles ====
- Road to Freedom / It Was a Very Good Year (9/1963)
- The Love of a Clown / If All You Think (10/1964)
- Every Minute of Every Day / That's Alright with Me (4/1965)
- This Could Be the Night (11/1965)
- Night Time Girl / Lifetime (3/1966)
- Don't You Wonder / I Had a Dream Last Night (5/1968)
- Together to Tomorrow / Keepin' the Dream Alive (3/1990)

==== Albums ====
- The Modern Folk Quartet (1963)
- Changes (1964)
- Moonlight Seranade (1985)
- Live in Japan (1989)
- Bamboo Saloon (1990)
- MFQ Christmas (1990)
- MFQ Wolfgang (1991)
- Highway 70 (1995)
- Live at The Ice House 1978 (2005)
- MFQ Live Archive Series (2006)
- The Best of The Modern Folk Quartet - From 1963 To 1995 (2017)

=== Other works ===
==== Albums ====
- 1967: The Zodiac: Cosmic Sounds
- 1971: Cyrus
- 1973: Islands
