= Waiting for the Sun (disambiguation) =

Waiting for the Sun is a 1968 album by The Doors

Waiting for the Sun may also refer to:

- "The Metre/Waiting for the Sun", a song by Powderfinger from their 2000 album, Odyssey Number Five
- "Waiting for the Sun", a song by The Doors from their 1970 album, Morrison Hotel
- "Waiting for the Sun", a song by the alt-country band The Jayhawks that appears on Hollywood Town Hall as the opening track.
- "Waiting for the Sun", a song by the Australian hard rock band The Angels from their 2012 album Take It to the Streets
- Waiting for the Sun: Strange Days, Weird Scenes & The Sound Of Los Angeles, a book by Barney Hoskyns
