= Farewell Aldebaran =

Studio album by Judy Henske and Jerry Yester
- Released: June 16, 1969
- Studio: Sunwest, Hollywood, California
- Genre: Psychedelia
- Length: 34:33
- Label: Straight
- Producer: Jerry Yester, Zal Yanovsky

Farewell Aldebaran is a 1969 album by the American musicians Judy Henske and Jerry Yester. Originally released on Frank Zappa's Straight record label, it contains an eclectic mix of songs in a wide variety of styles and is also notable for its early use of synthesisers. AllMusic describes the album as "a fusion of folk music, psychedelia, and arty pop, though that only scrapes the surface of the LP's stylistic complexity." Although the album got some good reviews it failed to sell in large quantities, purchasers possibly confused by its eclecticism.

== Background ==
Henske and Yester met while working in the West Coast folk scene in the early 1960s, Henske as an "eclectic and audacious" solo singer recording folk, blues, jazz and comedy, Yester as a member of the Modern Folk Quartet. They married in 1963. A few years later, Henske's career was faltering as a result of ill-advised forays into cabaret while Yester had produced albums by Tim Buckley and the Association, and replaced Zal Yanovsky in the Lovin' Spoonful.

The pair, with their newborn daughter, moved to Los Angeles in 1968. Henske shared a manager, Herb Cohen, with Frank Zappa, who suggested to her that she should put music to some of the verse she was writing. Yester, at this point, was working with Yanovsky on the latter's first solo album, and experimenting with new electronic and other sound effects. The couple combined to put together Farewell Aldebaran, drawing on a varied selection of their musician friends, and it was issued on Zappa and Cohen's new label.

== Music ==
The album was based on Henske's lyrics, many of which were verses written when she had a high fever: "an extraordinary group of literate song-poems setting oblique commentary on their life and her past against evocations of the fate of a fallen knight, a mare’s connection with the man who had stolen her, and the biography of a ship named Charity which yearned for a safe harbour." At the time, Yester and Yanovsky were co-producing Pat Boone's album Departure, and over a six-month period they used Boone's own studio to record Farewell Aldebaran. Musicians on the album, besides Yester, Henske, and Yanovsky, included David Lindley, Paul Beaver, Dick Rosmini, Larry Beckett, and Ray Brown.

The opener, "Snowblind", issued as a single, is a guitar-driven rocker that is enough in itself to establish Henske as a peerless rock vocalist and an able, witty lyricist. This is immediately followed by "Horses on a Stick", an almost parodic piece of "sunshine pop", Yester's polka harmonium reminiscent of a fairground steam-organ. Next is the sombre, spacious, marxophone-fractured "Lullaby" and then the melodramatic "St. Nicholas Hall", its satirical anti-clerical lyrics matched by choral samples from the Chamberlin keyboard. "Three Ravens", a sublime slice of baroque pop, fully orchestrated, based upon a Scottish folk lyric, is especially revered.

"Raider", which has been described as an "acid sea shanty", has a bluegrass feel created by bowed banjo and dulcimer backing a folksy-sounding but surreal lyric. "Mrs Connor" strays into jazz balladry, piano-led, as Yester details stark old age. "Rapture" is a highly atmospheric rock waltz with lyrics comparing the magic of love to the moment of death. The upbeat "Charity", sung by Yester to acoustic guitars and powerful vocal harmonies, tells of a sailing ship doomed to sail forever. Finally the title track, featuring electronically treated vocals and Moog synthesizer, is a unique piece of "space-rock" based upon an insistent bass drum, full of rushing, wailing and bleeping sounds as Yester intones "the comets cling to her, the fiery bride, she is the mother of the mark and the prize, the glaze of paradise is in her eyes, her mouth is torn with stars..." before the track fades into chaos.

According to AllMusic reviewer Mark Deming: "What holds Farewell Aldebaran together is the strength of the songs and arrangements, where Yester brings together a striking range of sounds and moods, and makes imaginative use of mellotrons and early Moog synthesizers. Henske rarely sounded this nuanced and effective on record, mainly because Yester gave her musical landscapes that were big enough for her talent and personality."

Overall, Justin F. Farrar of SF Weekly that Farewell Aldebaran was unusual even for a Straight release, calling it "a bizarre little collection of hard rock, baroque pop, AM-friendly pap, anthemic marches with vital social messages, and uptempo country-folk." He added that Henske and Yester "designed and constructed these tunes in the studio, creating massive musique concrète structures, with Henske's deep, muscular alto serving as their foundation. I mean, these are bombastic, no-room-to-breathe performances replete with intricately layered electronics and Yester's primitive use of synthesizer technology." Deming described the album as "a fusion of folk music, psychedelia, and arty pop, though that only scrapes the surface of the LP's stylistic complexity." He noted the eclecticism, noting the succession of "stomp-down primitivism" ("Snowblind"), "playful pop" ("Horses"), "tongue in cheek religious satire" ("St. Nicholas Hall"), the pretty "Three Ravens" and "the grand scale sci-fi finale of the title cut", contending that all the individual songs have their own characters.

== Reception ==
Professional ratings
Review scores
Source	Rating
AllMusic	4/5 stars

The album was not a commercial success, having been deemed "too eclectic and deliberately eccentric to find a place on radio". However, in the UK, the album was broadcast by John Peel, who played "Three Ravens" on Radio One, and it gained a cult following over the years.

Henske and Yester went on to form a more conventional band, Rosebud, before they divorced and went their separate ways at the start of the 1970s. Farewell Aldebaran was bootlegged on CD by Radioactive Records in 2005, and was re-issued officially, with bonus tracks, on Omnivore Recordings in 2016.

== Album cover ==
The album cover is a solarised negative photograph of Henske, Yester, their daughter and cat posed in a garden; the back cover is a color positive of the same picture. The photograph was taken by Ed Caraeff.

== Track listing ==
All lyrics by Judy Henske, music by Jerry Yester; except where indicated

Side one

1. "Snowblind" (Henske, Yester, Zal Yanovsky) - 3:07
2. "Horses on a Stick" - 2:10
3. "Lullaby" - 2:55
4. "St. Nicholas Hall" - 3:35
5. "Three Ravens" - 3:30

Side two

1. "Raider" - 5:12
2. "Mrs. Connor" - 2:17 (also listed as "One More Time")
3. "Rapture" - 4:09
4. "Charity" - 3:17
5. "Farewell Aldebaran" - 4:21

== Personnel ==
- Judy Henske - vocals (1–6, 8–10)
- Paul Beaver - Moog synthesizer programming (track 8, 10)
- Larry Beckett - drums (1), backing vocals (4, 9)
- Ray Brown - bass (5, 7)
- Roger Dollarhide - backing vocals (4)
- Solomon Feldthouse - hammered dulcimer (3, 6)
- John Forsha - 12 string guitar (2, 5, 9), backing vocals (4)
- Toxie French - drums (5–7)
- Eddie Hoh - drums (2, 9)
- Gail Levant - harp (5)
- David Lindley - banjo (6)
- Joe Osborn - bass (2)
- Dick Rosmini - guitar (9)
- Jerry Scheff - bass (6)
- Zal Yanovsky - bass (1,10), electric guitar (1, 2, 7, 10), backing vocals (2, 4, 9)
- Jerry Yester - vocals (2, 4–7, 9–10), guitar (1,10), piano (3–4, 6–10), harmonium (2, 4), toy zither (3), Marxophone (3), harpsichord (4–5), Chamberlin tape organ (4), orchestration (5), banjo (8), harmonica (8), Moog synthesizer (8, 10), Hammond organ (9)
- Uncredited string, brass and reed orchestras

=== Credits ===
- Produced by Yester/Yanovsky for Hairshirt Productions
- Recorded at Sunwest Studios - Hollywood
- Recorded and Mixed by Gary Brandt - except "Farewell Aldebaran": mixed by John Boylan
- Executive Producer: Herb Cohen
- Cover Photo by Ed Caraeff
- Special Effects: by Litholab
- Album design by John Williams

== Other source ==
- Richie Unterberger - Unknown Legends of Rock'n'Roll (1998)
