= Changes (Modern Folk Quartet album) =

Studio album by Modern Folk Quartet
- Released: Early 1964
- Recorded: Late 1963
- Studio: Capitol, Los Angeles
- Genre: Folk
- Length: 33:19
- Label: Warner Bros.
- Producer: Curly Waiters

Modern Folk Quartet chronology
The Modern Folk Quartet (1963)	Changes (1964)

Changes is the second and final studio album by the American folk band the Modern Folk Quartet. It was released in 1964 on the Warner Bros. Records label. The album expands upon the trend set from the group's debut: including interpretations of both traditional and contemporary folk standards, with an increased emphasis on the latter. By the time the Modern Folk Quartet recorded Changes, they were seasoned members of the folk scene, which enabled the group to produce much richer vocal harmonies.

The Modern Folk Quartet's self-titled 1963 debut album saw the group mix renditions of traditional folk songs, and newer compositions by the band's contemporaries on the folk circuit. Following the album, the band became regular performers, which helped the Modern Folk Quartet developed their vocal harmonies. Jerry Yester recalls the harmonies were the group's greatest strength, saying, "the only vocals that competed with us back then was Curt Boettcher's group [the folk band the Goldebriars]". For Changes, the Modern Folk Quartet was collaborating with a different record producer, Curly Waiters, though the original album release does not credit anyone. Recorded in late 1963 at Capitol Studios in Los Angeles, the album had a few traditional arrangements, but consisted largely of songs composed by the band's contemporaries in the folk scene. Some musical artists covered on the album also had their material appear on The Modern Folk Quartet, including the Kingston Trio and Bob Gibson.

Dino Valenti, whose song "Pennies" is featured on the first album, penned "The Little House" for Changes; however, for reasons unknown, he is credited as "Klonaris-Buerger". Valenti, along with session musician Dick Rosmini, guested on guitar on the track. The Modern Folk Quartet was also one of the earliest groups to cover material by singer-songwriter Phil Ochs, with the album including their take on his adaptation of Edgar Allan Poe's poem "The Bells". In addition, the group recorded the song, "Farewell", which its composer Bob Dylan never released on his own albums. Cyrus Faryar states the band's rendition was largely inspired by Judy Collins' cover of the song, which appears on her album, Judy Collins 3.

Changes was released in early 1964. As the album was distributed, the band—along with a multitude of other musical acts—were influenced into "going electric" by Dylan and the onset of the British Invasion. The Modern Folk Quartet relocated to Greenwich Village; however—aside for a few non-LP singles—never recorded again, which is credited to a heavy touring schedule.

== Track listing ==
1. "Sing Out" – 1:51
2. "Time's a Gettin' Hard" – 2:32
3. "The Bells" – 3:54
4. "And All the While" – 3:18
5. "In the Hills of Shiloh" – 3:38
6. "Hold the Fort" – 2:25
7. "Bullgine" – 2:32
8. "St. Clair's Defeat" – 3:36
9. "The Little House" – 2:21
10. "Ríu Chíu" – 1:46
11. "Farewell" – 2:59
12. "Jordan's River" – 2:27
