= This Could Be the Night (1966 song) =

Song first recorded by the Modern Folk Quartet

Song by Modern Folk Quartet
- Released: 1976
- Recorded: 1965
- Studio: Gold Star, Hollywood
- Genre: Folk rock
- Length: 2:39
- Songwriter(s): Harry Nilsson; Phil Spector
- Producer(s): Phil Spector

Audio sample
- file; help

"This Could Be the Night" is a song recorded by the American band Modern Folk Quartet (MFQ) in 1965. The lyrics describe a couple on the verge of conquering their inhibitions. Written in tribute to the Beach Boys' leader Brian Wilson, the song is one of three that are credited jointly to Harry Nilsson and Phil Spector, although Nilsson submitted that he was the sole writer on a 1966 copyright form.

Spector produced MFQ's version in his Wall of Sound style, featuring a dense orchestration and a marching rhythm. He used it as the opening theme music for the 1965 rock concert film The Big TNT Show, for which he was the musical director and associate producer. MFQ was signed to Spector's label and wanted to release their recording as a single in hopes of breaking into the folk rock market, but according to the music historian Barney Hoskyns, Spector instead abandoned the group to work on the 1966 single "River Deep – Mountain High". MFQ's recording of "This Could Be the Night" was not commercially available until 1976, when it appeared on a Spector compilation album.

Nilsson recorded the song several times, but only a 1967 demo intended for the Monkees has been officially released. In 1989, MFQ's Henry Diltz rerecorded the song as a solo artist, and in 1995, Wilson recorded the song for a Nilsson tribute album. Several other musicians have recorded their versions of the song, including David Cassidy, Tatsuro Yamashita, and the Flamin' Groovies.

== Composition ==
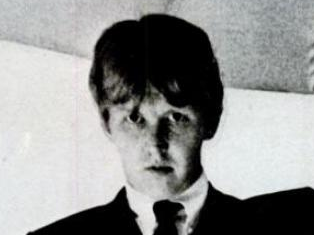
Harry Nilsson in 1967

According to Spector biographer Mick Brown, Nilsson wrote "This Could Be the Night" as a tribute to Brian Wilson of the Beach Boys. Nilsson brought it to Spector, whose productions Wilson greatly admired. Nilsson and Spector are often listed as the songwriters, including by BMI, the performing rights organization. In The Big TNT Show, Spector is credited as the sole author, while the song was copyrighted by Nilsson alone on March 30, 1966. It is one of three songs credited jointly to Nilsson and Spector, the other two being "Here I Sit" and "Paradise".

Nilsson biographer Alyn Shipton describes the lyrics as expressing "the heady mixture of hope, desire, and fear experienced when a couple who have been dating for a while are on the point of finally conquering their inhibitions and making love for the first time." Wilson deemed it one of Nilsson's very best compositions and one of Spector's best productions, explaining "Well, the idea they've been dating and waiting and finally they made love … I love that message."

== Recording ==
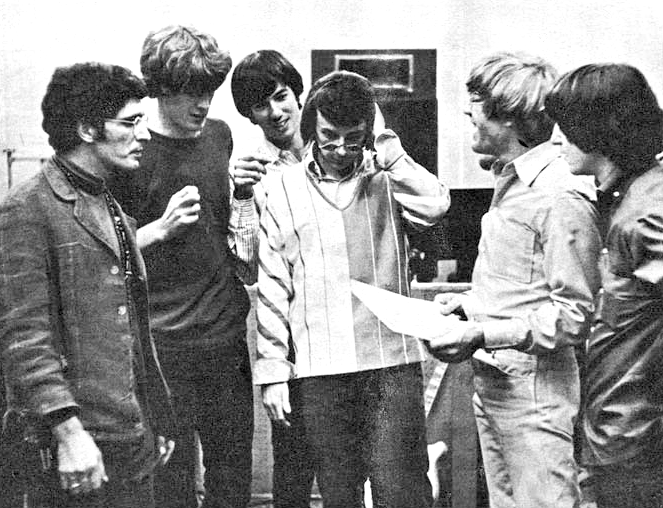
MFQ with Spector at Gold Star Studios in 1965 (from left to right): Cyrus Faryar, Jerry Yester, Chip Douglas, Phil Spector, Henry Diltz, Eddie Hoh

Hoping to break into the folk rock market, Spector befriended MFQ in 1965. The quartet had recently become a quintet (and shortened their name to MFQ) with the addition of drummer Eddie Hoh and was pursuing a Byrds'-inspired sound. Spector brought the group to Gold Star Studios in Hollywood to record the song. The session date(s) are unknown, but took place in late 1965, because the film was released in December 1965.

According to Brown, "Spector's production sounded as if it had been recorded in a school gynamsium—a vibrantly echoing mélange of chiming guitars, bells and exuberant, sunny harmonies". Barney Hoskyns described it as "pure Wall-of-Sound Beach Boys, light years from the sound Terry Melcher was getting with the Byrds". Biographer Mark Ribowsky added that the "folk rocker" resembled a "Wagnerian folk march with Wall of Sound". MFQ's Henry Diltz recalled Wilson at the studio during the sessions: "we could see him in the recording booth, in his robe and slippers, sitting there playing our song over and over, for what seemed like hours".

== Release history ==
"This Could Be the Night" was slated for release as MFQ's first single with the new lineup, but Spector became focused on Tina Turner and "River Deep – Mountain High" and "forgot all about the Modern Folk Quartet [sic]". Instead it was used as the theme to the rock concert film The Big TNT Show, the 1965 follow-up to the T.A.M.I. Show. The group's Jerry Yester later commented, "I never forgave him for the thing with the TNT Show [for which Spector was the musical director and associate producer]. We were supposed to be in it, because we were on his label, for god's sake. But we ended up being the entertainment for everybody while they were setting up for the next band".

The song was officially released for the first time on the 1976 British compilation album Phil Spector Wall of Sound Vol. 6 – Rare Masters Vol. 2. Several later compilations include it, such as Spector's 1991 career retrospective box set, Back to Mono (1958–1969).

== Harry Nilsson versions ==
Nilsson recorded a version of the song in the 1960s, which went unreleased. It was lost and forgotten until an acetate appeared in 2008 for sale on eBay. In 1967, Nilsson recorded a solo piano/vocal demo for the Monkees for their consideration in recording the song. Although they never recorded it, Nilsson's demo is included in The RCA Albums Collection, a 2013 box set. In 1989, Nilsson contributed guest vocals on a re-recording of the song by MFQ's Diltz. In the early 1990s, Nilsson recorded a new studio version by himself with additional lyrics, but it remains unreleased.

== Brian Wilson version ==
"This Could Be the Night"

Song by Brian Wilson

from the album For the Love of Harry: Everybody Sings Nilsson
- Released: May 9, 1995
- Length: 2:31
- Label: Music Masters Rock
- Songwriter(s): Harry Nilsson; Phil Spector
- Producer(s): Brian Wilson; Andy Paley

In 1973, Melody Maker reported that Wilson remembered most of the song "very clearly" while playing it on piano for his guests. The newspaper added, "Brian obviously got a buzz from singing it with differently harmonized bass lines and new riffs, and it was fascinating to hear how, even though he was only mucking about, the harmonies and rhythms were pure Brian Wilson. No one else could've been playing that piano."

Wilson claimed that he had been attempting to get the lyrics from Spector to record a version with the pop duo American Spring, but Spector was "strangely reluctant" to give away the song. In 1995, Wilson recorded his version–with co-production by Andy Paley–for the Nilsson tribute album For the Love of Harry: Everybody Sings Nilsson.
