= Morrison Hotel (Los Angeles) =

Hotel in Downtown Los Angeles

Coordinates: 34°02′23″N 118°15′55″W

General information
- Status: Closed indefinitely due to in-building fire
- Location: 1246 South Hope Street, Downtown Los Angeles, United States
- Year built: 1914
- Destroyed: December 26, 2024

The Morrison Hotel in Downtown Los Angeles is a hotel that is known for being the location where American rock band the Doors shot the album cover for their album of the same name.

== Structure ==
The building's structure consisted of four floors with 23 rooms. There were plans after it was purchased by the AIDS Healthcare Foundation to renovate it to add up to 444 rooms in 2023, but due to the fire in December 2024, the plans were cancelled.

== History ==
Not much is known about the early history of the building.

In 1970, photographer Henry Diltz, with the Doors, shot the album cover. According to John Densmore, the Doors asked permission to shoot it, but they were denied, so they shot the cover when the clerk wasn't looking. In 2023, the hotel was purchased by the AIDS Healthcare Foundation after being sold by its previous owner. On December 26, 2024, the building was permanently closed due to being severely damaged by a fire. As of January 2025, the cause of the fire is unknown, Los Angeles police and arson investigators are working on discovering the cause. The fire caused the roof of the building to fall down. After the AIDS Healthcare Foundation had secured the building, the homeless people nearby came over to cut the locks off of the door, as AIDS Healthcare Foundation vice president Mark Dyer said: "As soon as we secure the building, the homeless come up with power tools within hours and just cut the locks off". The building is eligible for inclusion in the California Register of Historical Resources, but is possibly ineligible for inclusion in the National Register of Historic Places due to being altered, largely due to the fire, according to a file available for viewing in the Los Angeles Historic Resources Inventory. The building was vacant, so there were zero injuries in the fire, all of the building inhabitants were in the lobby, so everyone quickly evacuated. The fire was successfully contained in a total of 1 hour 37 minutes.

== Sources ==
- Densmore, John (1991). Riders on the Storm: My Life with Jim Morrison and The Doors. London: Bloomsbury, Arrow. ISBN 0-09-993300-4.
