= The Big T.N.T. Show =

1965 film by Larry Peerce

- Genre: Blues; Rock; Folk; Country
- Directed by: Larry Peerce
- Starring: David McCallum; Ray Charles; Petula Clark; The Lovin' Spoonful; Bo Diddley; Joan Baez; The Ronettes; Roger Miller; The Byrds; Donovan; Ike and Tina Turner
- Country of origin: United States

Production
- Executive producers: Samuel Z. Arkoff; James H. Nicholson; Henry G. Saperstein
- Producer: Phil Spector
- Production locations: Los Angeles, California, United States
- Cinematography: Bob Boatman
- Camera setup: Multi-camera
- Running time: 93 minutes

Original release
- Release: December 1965

Related
- The T.A.M.I Show

The Big T.N.T. Show (also known as This Could Be the Night and The TNT Award Show) is a 1965 American concert film directed by Larry Peerce and produced by Phil Spector. A sequel to the T.A.M.I. Show (1964), the film features performances by numerous popular rock and roll and R&B musicians from the United States and the United Kingdom. It was distributed by American International Pictures.

== Filming ==
The film was shot before a live audience at the Moulin Rouge club at 6230 Sunset Boulevard in Los Angeles on November 29 and November 30, 1965.

The Big T.N.T. Show was aimed at the teenage demographic and featured 3,000 teenagers in the audience. "T.N.T." was an acronym for Tune 'n' Talent. The film was a follow-up to the T.A.M.I. Show, which was released a year prior. "T.A.M.I." was an acronym for "Teenage Awards Music International."

The concert was shot on videotape and transferred to 35-millimeter film. Director Larry Peerce used four television cameras to record the performances. Record producer Phil Spector was the producer and musical director.

According to executive producer Henry G. Saperstein, 140 minutes of footage was shot, but the film was cut down to 90 minutes for the theatrical release. Each of the acts performed their set three times.

Its pre-release title was This Could Be the Night—The Big T.N.T Show. The film's theme song, "This Could Be the Night", was written by Harry Nilsson, produced by Phil Spector, and performed by the Modern Folk Quartet.

=== Notable appearances ===
During the opening sequence of audience shots, Ron Mael and Russell Mael, who would later form the band Sparks can be seen at 4:44 and Sky Saxon, singer and frontman for The Seeds can be seen at 5:21. Frank Zappa appears very briefly in the movie at 6:30 as an audience member and can also be seen in the movie's trailer. Marilyn McCoo of the Fifth Dimension also appears as one of the backing singers during Ray Charles' performance. Actress Teri Garr appears as one of the show’s dance troupe.

== Release and reception ==
The Big T.N.T Show premiered in theaters in late December 1965. A general release date was initially planned for January 26, 1966.

UPI Hollywood columnist Vernon Scott wrote that the "film is aimed solely at kids who buy recordings of the performers in the cast. It's a musical orgy for pubescent swingers."

== List of performers ==
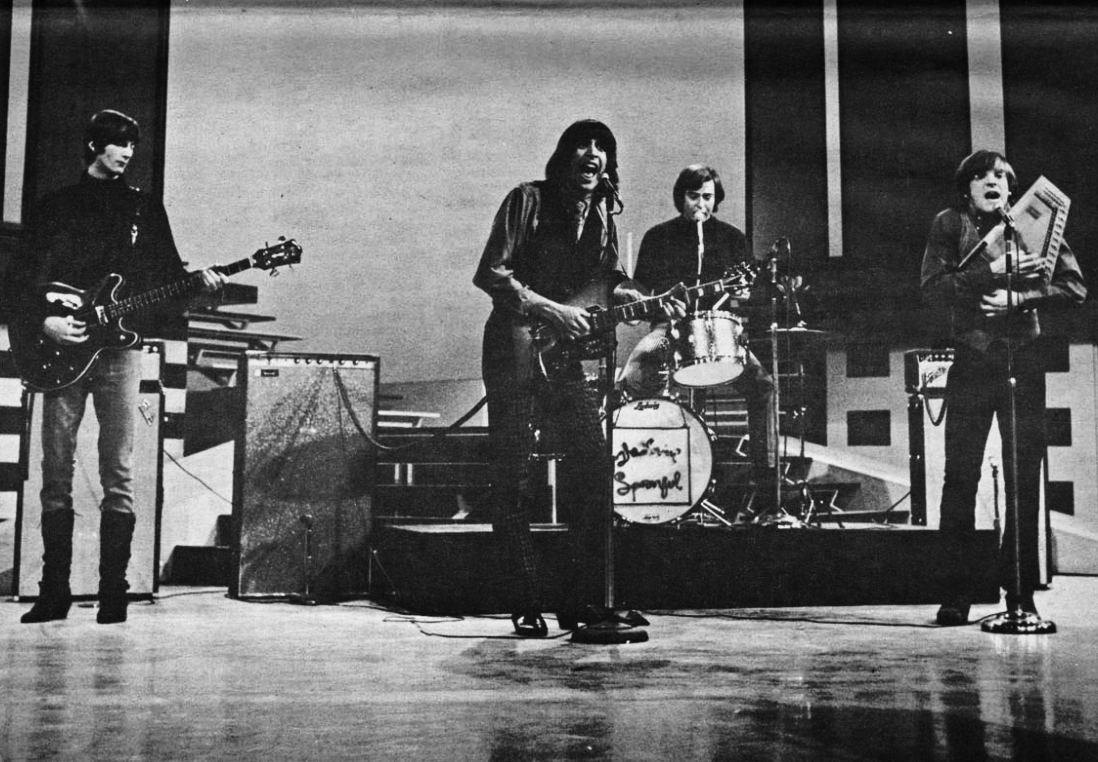
The Lovin' Spoonful performing on stage for The Big T.N.T Show. From left to right: Steve Boone, Zal Yanovsky, Joe Butler, John Sebastian.

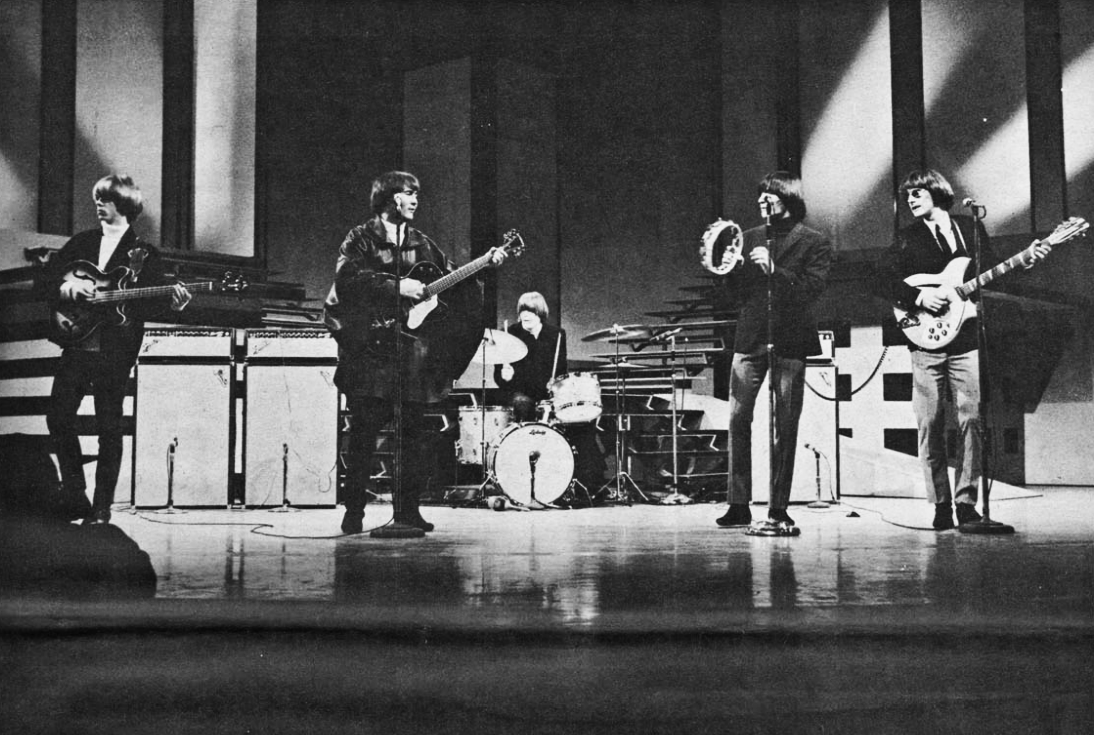
The Byrds performing on stage for The Big T.N.T Show. From left to right: Chris Hillman, David Crosby, Michael Clarke, Gene Clark, Roger McGuinn.

In order of appearance in the film:

Artist	Song title
David McCallum	"(I Can't Get No) Satisfaction" (instrumental)
Ray Charles	"What'd I Say"
Petula Clark	"Downtown"
The Lovin' Spoonful	"Do You Believe in Magic",
The Lovin' Spoonful	"You Didn't Have to Be So Nice"
Bo Diddley	"Hey Bo Diddley"
Bo Diddley	"Bo Diddley"
Joan Baez	"500 Miles"
Joan Baez	"There but for Fortune"
Ray Charles (reprise)	"Georgia on My Mind"
Ray Charles (reprise)	"Let the Good Times Roll"
Joan Baez (reprise)	"You've Lost That Loving Feeling"
The Ronettes	"Be My Baby"
The Ronettes	"Shout"
Roger Miller	"Dang Me"
Roger Miller	"Engine Engine #9"
Roger Miller	"King of the Road"
Roger Miller	"England Swings"
The Byrds	"Turn! Turn! Turn! (To Everything There Is a Season)"
The Byrds	"The Bells of Rhymney"
The Byrds	"Mr. Tambourine Man"
Petula Clark (reprise)	"You're the One"
Petula Clark (reprise)	"My Love"
Donovan	"Universal Soldier"
Donovan	"Summer Day Reflection Songs"
Donovan	"Bert's Blues"
Donovan	"Sweet Joy"
Ike & Tina Turner	"Shake"
Ike & Tina Turner	"A Fool In Love"
Ike & Tina Turner	"It's Gonna Work Out Fine"
Ike & Tina Turner	"Please, Please, Please"
Ike & Tina Turner	"Goodbye, So Long"
Ike & Tina Turner	"Tell the Truth"
David McCallum (reprise)	"1-2-3" (instrumental)

== Home video ==
Some footage from the concert film was reused in the film That Was Rock a.k.a. The T.A.M.I. / T.N.T. Show (1984). The Shout! Factory released it on DVD and Blu-ray in 2016.

== See also ==
- List of American films of 1965
