= Jazz funeral =

Tradition developed in New Orleans

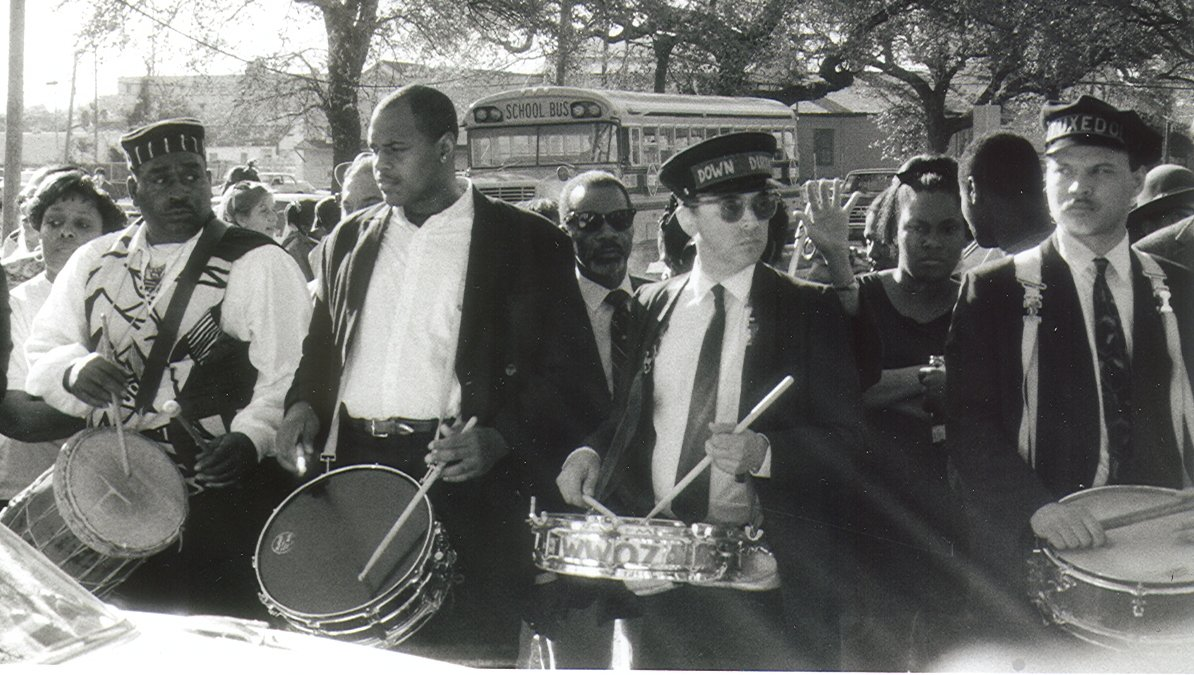
Drummers at the funeral of jazz musician Danny Barker in 1994. They include Louis Cottrell, (great-grandson of New Orleans' innovative drumming pioneer, Louis Cottrell, Sr. and grandson of New Orleans clarinetist Louis Cottrell, Jr.) of the Young Tuxedo Brass Band, far right; Louis "Bicycle Lewie" Lederman of the Down & Dirty Brass band, second from right.

A jazz funeral is a traditional funeral procession in New Orleans, Louisiana accompanied by a brass band. The procession typically combines solemn funeral rites with music and, after the burial or farewell, may transition into a more celebratory atmosphere commemorating the life of the deceased.

== History ==
The term "jazz funeral" was long in use by observers from elsewhere, but was generally disdained as inappropriate by most New Orleans musicians and practitioners of the tradition. The preferred description was "funeral with music"; while jazz was part of the music played, it was not the primary focus of the ceremony. This reluctance to use the term faded significantly in the final 15 years or so of the 20th century among the younger generation of New Orleans brass band musicians more familiar with the post-Dirty Dozen Brass Band and Soul Rebels Brass Band funk influenced style than the older traditional New Orleans jazz.

The tradition blends strong European and African cultural influences. Louisiana's colonial past gave it a tradition of military style brass bands which were called on for many occasions, including playing funeral processions. This was combined with African spiritual practices, specifically the Yoruba tribe of Nigeria and other parts of West Africa. Jazz funerals are also heavily influenced by early twentieth century Protestant and Catholic churches, black brass bands, and the idea of celebrating after death in order to please the spirits who protect the dead. Another group that has influenced jazz funerals are the Mardi Gras Indians.

The tradition was widespread among New Orleanians across ethnic boundaries at the start of the 20th century. As the common brass band music became wilder in the years before World War I, some white New Orleanians considered the hot music disrespectful, and such musical funerals became rare among the city's white citizens. After the 1960s, it gradually started being practiced across ethnic and religious boundaries. Most commonly such musical funerals are done for individuals who are musicians themselves, connected to the music industry, or members of various social aid and pleasure clubs or Carnival krewes who make a point of arranging for such funerals for members. Although the majority of jazz funerals are for African American musicians there has been a new trend in which jazz funerals are given to young people who have died.

The organizers of the funeral arrange for hiring the band as part of the services. When a respected fellow musician or prominent member of the community dies, some additional musicians may also play in the procession as a sign of their esteem for the deceased. In more recent times anyone can request a Jazz funeral, but the musician route is still the most commonly seen today.

A typical jazz funeral begins with a march by the family, friends, and a brass band from the home, funeral home, or church to the cemetery. During the funeral march, onlookers have been known to join in with the festivities of the passing of life. Throughout the march, the band plays somber dirges and hymns. A change in the tenor of the ceremony takes place, after either the deceased is entombed, or the hearse leaves the procession and members of the procession say their final goodbye and they "cut the body loose". After this the music becomes more upbeat, often starting with a hymn or spiritual number played in a swinging fashion, then going into popular hot tunes. There is raucous music and cathartic dancing where onlookers join in to celebrate the life of the deceased. Those who follow the band just to enjoy the music are called the second line, and their style of dancing, in which they walk and sometimes twirl a parasol or handkerchief in the air, is called second lining.

Some typical pieces often played at jazz funerals are the slow, and somber song "Nearer My God to Thee" and such spirituals as "Just a Closer Walk With Thee". The later more upbeat tunes frequently include "When the Saints Go Marching In" and "Oh, Didn't He Ramble".

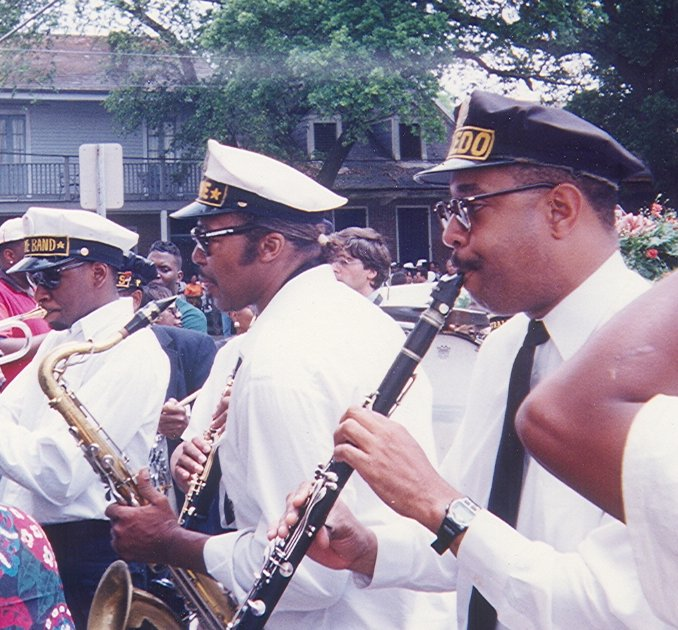
Musicians play for a funeral leaving St. Augustine Church in the Tremé neighborhood; Michael White in foreground.

== In popular culture ==
The Cincinnati Kid (1965), which takes place in New Orleans, begins with a jazz funeral in which the song "Oh, Didn't He Ramble" is played.

In the James Bond film Live and Let Die (1973), an early scene shows a secret agent being murdered under cover of a jazz funeral.

The 2010 HBO TV series Treme frequently features jazz funerals as part of its depiction of the New Orleans musical landscape.

The Originals, a spin-off of The Vampire Diaries, which started in 2013 and ran for 5 seasons, features several jazz funerals. Unlike true jazz funerals which go from a home, funeral home, or church to the cemetery, the jazz funerals in The Originals are always in the French Quarter Square. They also mostly showcase only the lively music portion and not the somber.

Hadestown, a musical by Anaïs Mitchell, uses a jazz funeral and second line dancing for the number "Way Down Hadestown" as Persephone prepares for her trip to the Underworld.

Legacies, a 2018 4-season spin-off of The Originals, also features a jazz funeral for the main character's father, Klaus Michaelson.

In the 2023 Disney film Haunted Mansion, a jazz funeral takes place on the streets of New Orleans in which an original song called "His Soul Left Gloss on the Rose" is performed by The Soul Rebels.

Jazz funeral was one of the inspirations behind a funeral scene in the episode "Rix Road" in the 2023 Disney+ television series Andor.

== See also ==
- Dancing Pallbearers
- Historic Cemeteries of New Orleans
- List of cemeteries in Louisiana
- Month's Mind, requiem mass played a month after death
