= A Genuine Rosmini =

Studio album by Dick Rosmini
- Released: 1969
- Genre: Folk
- Label: Imperial
- Producer: Alex Hassilev

Dick Rosmini chronology
Adventures for 12-String, 6-String and Banjo (1964)	A Genuine Rosmini (1969)

A Genuine Rosmini is the second album by American folk guitarist Dick Rosmini, released in 1969.

Rosmini is best known for his role in the American "folk revival" of the 1960s as a session player and accompanist. A Genuine Rosmini was Rosmini's second and last solo album. He recorded only four albums under his own name, two of them instructional albums.

A Genuine Rosmini consists mostly of solos with backing for 6- and 12-string solo guitar, electric guitar. Rosmini sings on "Let's Go Get Stoned". The album exhibits the contemporary shift away from 'pure' early 60s folk to a hybrid style incorporating electric instruments and well-known popular songs.

== Track listing ==
All tracks composed by Dick Rosmini; except where noted

=== Side one ===
1. "Paradise Thursday"
2. "The Fool on the Hill" (John Lennon, Paul McCartney)
3. "Did You Ever Have to Make Up Your Mind" (John B. Sebastian)
4. "Licks for Sale"
5. "Trains and Boats and Planes" (Burt Bacharach, Hal David)
6. "El Funko"

=== Side two ===
1. "Let's Go Get Stoned" (Nicolas Ashford, Valerie Simpson, Jo Armstead)
2. "The Duchess"
3. "People Got to Be Free" (Felix Cavaliere, Eddie Brigati)
4. "With a Little Help from My Friends" (Lennon, McCartney)
5. "I Heard It Through the Grapevine" (Norman Whitfield, Barrett Strong)
6. "Wichita Lineman" (Jimmy Webb)

== Personnel ==
- Dick Rosmini – 6 and 12-string guitar, electric guitar, vocals on "Let's Go Get Stoned"
- Jim Gordon – drums
- Michael Botts – drums
- Jerry Scheff – bass
- Van Dyke Parks – piano, harpsichord
- Larry Knechtel – piano, organ
- Paul Lewinson – piano, organ, arrangements
- Gary Coleman – percussion
- John Audino, Donald Menza, Plas Johnson, Gene Cipriano, James Horn, Jay Migliori, Anthony Terran – horns
- Anne Goodman, Douglas Davis, Leonard Malarksy, Harry Bluestone, Bonnie Douglas, Erno Neufeld, Robert Berens – strings

Technical

- George Rodriguez - cover photography
