= Rosebud (band) =

Rosebud was the name of an American popular music group which released a single and an eponymous album in 1971.

Its members were Judy Henske, Jerry Yester, Craig Doerge, John Seiter, and David Vaught. The album was a follow-up to the Henske-Yester collaboration, Farewell Aldebaran. Rosebud was seen as a democratic enterprise, with all band members contributing songs and singing, broadly in a countryish soft rock style. Following its release and a couple of live shows, the band split up, Henske and Yester divorced, and she and Doerge married.

Yester is credited as the producer of their lone album. The LP was released on the Straight/Reprise label; the album was rereleased on CD in 2004 by Collectors' Choice Music, and again in 2017 with bonus tracks by Omnivore Recordings.

Yester, Henske, and Doerge have continued to produce and record music, and Judy Henske (1936-2022) returned to the studio and toured as well.

== Rosebud album track listing ==
Side one

1. "Panama" (Jerry Yester, Judy Henske) – 3:32
2. "Le Soleil" (Yester, Henske) – 2:35
3. "Reno" (Craig Doerge, Henske) – 3:45
4. "Western Wisconsin" (Yester, Henske) – 3:50
5. "Lorelei" (Yester, Henske) – 3:52

Side two

6. "Salvation" (Doerge, Henske) – 4:15
7. "Lullabye II (Summer Carol)" (Yester, Henske) – 2:28
8. "The Yum Yum Man" (Doerge, Henske) – 3:35
9. "Roll Home Cheyenne" (Yester, Henske) – 3:37
10. "Flying To Morning" (Doerge, Henske) – 4:21

2017 CD reissue bonus tracks:

11. "Lazy"
12. "Reno" (Mono Single Version)
13. "Mercury of Fools"
14. "Hey Old Friend" (Judy Vocal)
15. "Le Soleil" (Demo)
16. "What's The Matter With Sam"
17. "Easy On Me, Easy"
18. "Father of Souls"
19. "Mercury of Fools" (Demo)
20. "Hey Old Friend" (Jerry Vocal, Demo)

=== Personnel ===
Rosebud

- Judy Henske – vocals
- Jerry Yester – guitars, vocals, banjo, autoharp, bass
- Craig Doerge – keyboards, vocals, vibes, concertina
- David Vaught – bass
- John Seiter — drums, vocals, percussion

Additional Personnel

- Mike Deasy – electric and 12-string guitars (tracks 3, 6)
- Buddy Emmons – pedal steel guitar (tracks 8)
- Barry Zweig – guitar (tracks 9)
- Ray Brown – bass (track 9)
