= Whiskeyhill Singers =

American folk musical group

- Genre: Folk
- Years active: 1961
- Labels: Capitol, MGM
- Members: Dave Guard; Cyrus Faryar; David "Buck" Wheat; Judy Henske

The Whiskeyhill Singers were an American folk revival group formed in early 1961 by Dave Guard after he left The Kingston Trio. Guard formed the Singers as an attempt to return to the Trio's earlier roots in folk music. The Singers lasted about six months before disbanding. During that short period, the group released one album, Dave Guard & The Whiskeyhill Singers. They also recorded a number of songs for the soundtrack of the 1962 film How the West Was Won; however, only four of these were used in the movie.

== History ==
The Kingston Trio had risen quickly in two years from smoky gigs in the San Francisco peninsula's college town fraternity houses, bistros and bars to the city's prestigious hungry i and Purple Onion nightclubs to become nationally and internationally successful. However, Guard felt that by 1961 the Trio's musical style had become fixed and predictable and its performances increasingly commercial. The Trio, Guard reportedly felt, had lost touch with the folk music roots that brought him to form The Calypsonians, which he had formed with Nick Reynolds. That band had morphed into The Kingston Quartet and then finally with Bob Shane back from Hawaii into the Kingston Trio. Guard had concerns and conflicts with the way the Trio's publishing earnings were being handled. Those issues, combined with underlying resentments and ego clashes between himself and his Trio colleague and former Punahou School classmate Shane over control and leadership of the now successful group, led Guard finally to leave (Note: 1. The unique sounds of Hawaiian slack key tuned guitars and finger picking come from a wide variety of alternate guitar tunings, many of them family secrets passed down from generation to generation. These alternate tunings present chording and fingering difficulties which are very difficult for haoles to master. However, it is possible to some extent to mimic slack key by using some common slack key riffs and doing some 'creative' finger picking.; 2. KGU was owned by the Honolulu Advertiser, and KGMB was owned, in part, by the Honolulu Star-Bulletin.; 3. Mitch Miller and the Gang.; 4. Guard's break with the Trio wasn't on friendly terms.) the group. Shortly thereafter Guard formed the Whiskeyhill Singers with another Punahou high school friend Cyrus Faryar and the Trio's bassist and musicologist David "Buck" Wheat.

In line with Guard's intention to return to folk music with its frequently uninhibited enthusiasm and vocal harmonies, Faryar suggested the group bring in an acquaintance of his, Judy Henske, to provide a female balance to the male harmonies and in so doing move definitively away from the Kingston Trio's male-only vocal format. Guard agreed, and the Whiskeyhill Singers with Henske as female lead developed their own often innovative mood, style, and sound.

Despite the group's intent to return to folk music along the lines of Pete Seeger and The Weavers, Guard and Wheat's association with the Trio and its musical style inevitably had an influence on the Singers' own musical approach. Complicating matters was that the Trio's performing style of uninhibited enthusiasm was also based loosely on the Weavers concert persona, leading to criticism that the Singers were more "Trio-like" than original.

At the time that the group disbanded, Guard said that The Whiskeyhill Singers had posted a loss of $10,000.

=== How the West Was Won ===
The producers of the MGM film How the West Was Won had approached the Kingston Trio to sing folk songs on the soundtrack for the movie. However, after learning that Guard was beginning a new group, the producers felt that the Whiskeyhills' sound was better suited to their production. The Whiskeyhills performed several folk songs in the movie, including "Raise A Ruckus Tonight" with The Ken Darby Singers as the general chorus behind Debbie Reynolds). Judy Henske sang lead with the Singers on "Careless Love" and soloed as the unidentified singer on "A Railroader's Bride I'll Be". Cyrus Faryar sang solo on the track "Wanderin'" and Dave Guard on "Poor Wayfarin' Stranger". The film was nominated for the Academy Award in 1962 for the best Motion Picture Soundtrack. Originally the Whiskeyhills recorded the main title tune, but once this small group of singers performed on a soundstage before the full MGM Studio Orchestra, the resulting sound was somewhat underwhelming. The full choir finally performed the song over the closing scene of the film.

== The Group ==
=== Dave Guard ===
Dave Guard is considered to be a very important figure of the folk music scene of both the 1950s and 1960s. The Kingston Trio is credited with creating and popularizing eclectic folk and neo-folk music, a form that later expanded into "world music".

=== Buckwheat ===
David "Buck" Wheat was born in San Antonio, Texas, in 1922. Lived for many years in Sausalito, California, part of the "Beat" generation. He was a well-known jazz guitarist and bass player with the big dance bands and in 1957 recorded with the Chet Baker Trio on "My Funny Valentine" and "Embraceable You". He is best known as the bass accompanist for The Kingston Trio.

=== Cyrus Faryar ===
Like Guard, Cyrus Faryar attended Punahou School, graduating in 1953.

By 1957 Faryar's avant garde interests led him to establish a "Beat" style coffee house in Honolulu. Popularized first in San Francisco's Broadway section, Faryar's Greensleeves coffee house was, like those popularized first by San Francisco's Beat Generation in the Broadway section of the city, a gathering place for local musicians, poets, and writers.

Faryar was contacted by Guard about joining a new group, later to become the Whiskeyhill Singers, before Guard's final appearances with the Trio. He had been performing his solo act at Scottsdale Arizona and received a telephone call from Guard saying that he was leaving the Trio and would arrange to meet with him and Buckwheat when The Kingston Trio was performing a scheduled date at Tempe a few weeks later. By that time Faryar had closed Greensleeves, left Honolulu, and established himself in San Diego, California. Faryar agreed, having known Guard from their Punahou days together, and having appeared with him in various school drama and musical productions.

=== Liz Seneff ===
Liz Seneff (a.k.a. Elizabeth Seneff-Corrigan) joined The Whiskeyhill Singers in July 1962 after Judy Henske departed the group. Her tenure was brief, as Guard was already seeking a home in Sydney Australia and he moved there in October 1962 after winding-up the group.

== The Group's Music History ==
=== Early Years ===
Guard, like his classmate Bob Shane (b. Robert Castle Schoën), grew up in Honolulu, in what was then a remote, but strategically important, U.S. territorial possession in the Pacific, the pre-statehood Territory of Hawaii. The only two radio stations in Honolulu during Guard's high school and pre-high school years were AM stations KGU and KGMB. Both stations, each owned by Honolulu's two newspapers and conservative in their popular music programs. Hawaiian music and the most popular "Hit Parade" tunes of the late '40s, early '50s were the popular music staples that Guard and Shane, and their classmates heard over the airwaves. Television did not arrive in the Territory until 1952, after both Guard and Shane had completed high school and gone on to college on the mainland.

While Guard and Shane were teenagers in Hawaii there was only one record shop in Honolulu where new pop tunes – carried in cargo holds of Matson Lines freighters sailing from California, usually four to six weeks after their release on the mainland – could be listened to in listening booths and purchased.

It was in this relatively austere pop music environment, with its one pop music DJ "Aku" heard during the morning hours and the commute to school and the ever-present Hawaiian music with its harmonies and falsettos, strumming guitars and ukuleles and their country riffs and slack key finger-picking, clearly influenced both Guard and Shane's instrumental development and were embedded in the Trio's and later the Singers arrangements. A high school drama presentation of Oklahoma in 1951 brought Guard and Shane, along with similarly guitar-competent classmate Bob Murphy, together as a group. This influenced soloists Guard and Shane to get together and form what was later to become The Kingston Trio.

While at Punahou, Guard and his '52 classmate Bob Shane were frequently and regularly exposed to the words and a cappella harmonies of the classical Hawaiian music of Hawai'i's revered Queen Liliuokalani. Ukuleles and guitars tuned to either standard tuning or to one of the many Hawaiian slack key tunings, were the standard – if not expected – accompaniment to virtually all local music. In the 7th and 8th grades in the Junior Academy at Punahou, "ukulele" was a required music class for all students; thereafter Shane became quite accomplished with the ukulele, graduating from standard to tenor ukulele and then to baritone uke, with one or the other almost always in or near his hand.

Guard and Shane were also regularly exposed to Japanese, Chinese, Filipino, and Portuguese language music. Popular Japanese tunes of the 1949–1953 era, like "Kankan musumae (koku no Hawai'i)" were among haole and non-haole's alike. Though the duo were rarely understood the songs words, they were able to remember and sing a medley of popular and traditional Hawaiian "folk music" at parties and events. Guard and Shane learned how to sing along and play a ukulele or guitar during their high school years at Punahou.

Within this background of Hawaiian/Polynesian harmonies and instrumental accompaniments for staples like Genoa Keawe's "Kaimana Hila" came the folk music of Burl Ives and Pete Seeger, with party songs like Burl Ives' rendition of "On Top Of Old Smokey", Pete Seeger and The Weavers' "Goodnight, Irene" and Roy Acuff's "Wabash Cannonball". The calypso rhythms and vocals of Harry Belafonte, and the hand-clapping, sing-along style of Mitch Miller's group, influenced Guard's and Shane's, and eventually the Trio's, musical style.

In the early 1950s, Fijiian tunes, like "Isa Lei", the perennial slack key favorite, the comic Samoan "Salomila", the classic "Pupu o Ewa", taught as one of Shane's Punahou graduating class of 1952's Hawaiian songs sung en chorale during their graduation (and which Don Ho's performed with English lyrics to become his signature, tourist favorite "Pearly Shells"), and the catchy, toe-tapping "Molokai Nui Ahina", all of which were beach and house party favorites that influenced and contributed to Guard and Shane's music style and rhythms.

In the pop music realm, both Guard and Shane appear influenced by the harmonies and often lusty style of Mitch Miller's group, the distinctive voices of Vaughn Monroe, and (early on) young Dean Martin. Fast guitar strumming rhythms and rippling banjo riffs characteristic in Pete Seeger and The Weavers's renditions became the basic and ultimately expected sound in Guard's and Shane's Kingston Trio, a sound which Guard repeated in his Whiskeyhill Singers group. A glimpse of the early influence on Guard of Miller's group, Mitch Miller and the Gang, seeps out in the title of his group's album, Dave Guard and the Whiskeyhill Singers.

Guard and Shane's relative isolation from the varieties of mainland pop music and their continual exposure to Polynesian sing-along harmonies with their strummed guitar accompaniments are clearly heard in both the Trio's and the Singers' renditions. For example, Hawaiian slack key guitar riffs can be heard throughout the Singers' rendition of Salomila.

=== Post-Trio ===
Guard and Buck Wheat's departure from the Trio and the forming of the Whiskeyhill Singers allowed Guard to have the freedom and total control over the repertoire and style of a more 'folk-like' folk music group. The addition of Henske to the group, with her often harsh, contemporary, but out of place Janis Joplin-esque vocals, may have done more harm to the group than good. If Guard's objective was to meld traditional folk with contemporary '60's activist intensity and Trio-style renditions, he may have succeeded in accomplishing his goal. Whether Guard's idea of a 'new' folk music style was viable and acceptable to the public is hard to tell, since once again, differences with group members quickly led the Singers down the road to a short group life.

== Post-Break-Up ==
After disbanding of the Singers Faryar and Henske went their separate ways but still maintained contact and friendship. The two returned to the San Diego area where they performed for a few years, with Faryar eventually returning to Hawai'i and taking up a relatively reclusive residence on the state's Big Island. ^{[1]}

=== Dave Guard ===
Guard spent a few years vacillating between wanting to return to the Trio and wanting not to return to the Trio. In his absence, the other two members of the Trio, Bob Shane and Nick Reynolds, recruited John Stewart to take Guard's place. The new configuration continued the Trio's success until they disbanded in 1967. Shortly after the Trio breakup, Shane formed a group called the New Kingston Trio, which he led. Shane, understandably, was not much interested in having Guard back in his new group.

Guard moved his family to Australia, and kept active in his musical interests, developing a guitar teaching tool he called "Colour Guitar". A cardboard color-coded chording device, the tool met with little financial success. He hosted his own TV show, Dave's Place, in Australia in the late part of 1965. Guard returned to the US in 1968. He died of lymphatic cancer in 1991.

=== Buck Wheat ===
David "Buck" Wheat went on to arrange and record with Bud & Travis duo. Wheat died in Los Angeles in 1985 at the age of 63.

=== Cyrus Faryar ===
Faryar established himself as a singer and songwriter, first with the Modern Folk Quartet, recording two albums with Elektra, Islands and Cyrus and then as a solo performer and accompanist with a number of other groups.

At the end of his recording and performing career, Faryar returned home to Hawaii.

=== Judy Henske ===
Henske's singing career continued as a soloist and performer with other groups, cutting several records. She died in 2022 at the age of 85.

=== Liz Seneff ===
Seneff released a solo album Now Listen to Liz and a single for the Gateway label in 1963 and was later a member of the semi-psychedelic group The Split Level that released one album Divided We Stand on the Dot label in 1968. She otherwise devoted her time to live solo appearances and promotional work. Seneff died from breast cancer in 1993.

== Discography ==
- Dave Guard and the Whiskeyhill Singers 1962 (Capitol)
- Whiskeyhill Singers 2nd Album (unreleased) (1962)
- "Ride on Railroad Bill" (single) 1962 (Capitol)
- "Plane Wreck at Los Gatos" (single) 1962 (Capitol)
- Dave Guard and the Whiskeyhill Singers (2001) (Collectors Choice)
- How the West Was Won: Original Motion Picture Soundtrack (MGM) Academy Award: Best Soundtrack 1963
