= Adventures for 12-String, 6-String and Banjo =

Studio album by Dick Rosmini
- Released: 1964
- Studio: Whitney Recording Studio, Glendale, California
- Genre: Folk
- Label: Elektra
- Producer: Jac Holzman

Dick Rosmini chronology
| Adventures for 12-String, 6-String and Banjo (1964) | A Genuine Rosmini (1969) |

Adventures for 12-String, 6-String and Banjo is an album by American folk guitarist Dick Rosmini, released in 1964. It is out of print in LP format, appears never to have been released in CD format, and has been available as an MP3 download since October 5, 2010 (ASIN B004620SNC).

== History ==
Rosmini is best known for his role in the American "folk revival" of the 1960s as a session player and accompanist. Adventures for 12-String, 6-String and Banjo was Rosmini's first solo album and was, at the time, one of the few solo steel-string guitar albums available. He recorded only four albums under his own name, two of them instructional albums.

Adventures for 12-String, 6-String and Banjo has been cited as a major influence by many acoustic guitarists including Dave Van Ronk, Leo Kottke , and Jimmy PageIt is mainly solo guitar or banjo plus bass, second guitars, and percussion.

== Reception ==
Professional ratings
Review scores
| Source | Rating |
|---|---|
| Allmusic | 4.5/5 stars |

Writing for Allmusic, music critic Richard Meyer wrote of the album "This album predates much of John Fahey's work and certainly that of Leo Kottke and the other "American primitive" guitarists. Hard to find but well worth the search"

== Track listing ==
=== Side one ===
1. "Little Brown Dog"
2. "900 Miles to Go"
3. "Casey"
4. "Joshua"
5. "Shady Grove" (Traditional)
6. "Improvisation for 12-String" (Rosmini)
7. "St. James Drag"
8. "Macedonian Rag"

=== Side two ===
1. "John Hardy" (Traditional)
2. "Two Shady Ladies in 3/4 Time" (Traditional)
3. "Jelly Roll"
4. "Picker's Medley"
5. "Goin' Baroque"
6. "Sweet Substitute"
7. "Freight Train" (Elizabeth Cotten)
8. "Sadie"
9. "Minstrel Boy"

== Personnel ==
- Dick Rosmini – 6 and 12-string guitar, banjo (double-tracked on "John Hardy" (banjo) and "Minstrel Boy", "Sweet Substitute" and "Jelly Roll" (guitar), whistling, arranger, adapter
- Red Mitchell – bass
- Gene Estes – drums
- Doug Marsch – drums
- Allan Reuss – second guitar
- Tony Rizzi – second guitar
- Johnny Horton – second guitar

Technical

- Mark Abramson - recording
- William S. Harvey - design
- Angelo Laiacona - photography
