= Oh, Didn't He Ramble =

Song
- Written: 1902
- Genre: Dixieland jazz, jazz standard
- Composer(s): J. Rosamond Johnson; James Weldon Johnson; Bob Cole

"Oh, Didn't He Ramble" is a New Orleans jazz standard, copyrighted in 1902 by J. Rosamond Johnson, James Weldon Johnson, and Bob Cole. It is frequently used at the end of jazz funerals.

Several sources trace its origins to the English folk song "The Derby Ram" (Roud 126). In 1888, it was published as a work song from Texas, with the chorus "Didn't he ramble? Didn't he ramble? / Oh, he rambled till the butcher cut him down!". The chorus was then adapted by leading African American songwriters, the Johnson brothers and Cole, jointly credited as the songwriter "Will Handy" (but not associated with W. C. Handy), and published in 1902 as "Oh, Didn't He Ramble". It quickly became a standard in the repertoire of New Orleans jazz bands. In its originally copyrighted version, the song had seven verses, telling the story of Buster Beebe, whose adventures led him to a jail sentence and the loss of his money through gambling. However, the verses are now rarely performed.

The tune is now traditionally played at the end of a New Orleans jazz funeral. "In contrast to the slower, sadder spirituals that are played on the way to a burial... it’s a joyous tune that suggests the deceased should have no regrets because he "rambled all around, in and out of town"". The words are usually set out as: "Oh! didn’t he ramble, ramble? / He rambled all around, in and out of town, / Oh, didn’t he ramble, ramble, / He rambled till the butchers cut him down."

"Traditionally, at New Orleans jazz funerals, brass bands play slow, mournful hymns as the deceased’s body is carried out of the church and placed in a hearse or horse-drawn carriage. The band continues to play in this fashion until the procession reaches the cemetery. Once the priest or minister finishes performing his benediction and the congregation begins to leave the cemetery, the band strikes up a more up-beat selection of songs in celebration of the deceased’s life."

The song was performed by George H. Primrose, and first recorded by Arthur Collins in 1902. Later recordings include those by Fiddlin' John Carson (1932), Jelly Roll Morton (1939), Kid Ory (1945), Louis Armstrong (1950), Peggy Lee (1955), the Preservation Hall Jazz Band (1988), and Dr. John (1992).
