= Henry Diltz =

American folk musician and photographer (b. 1938)

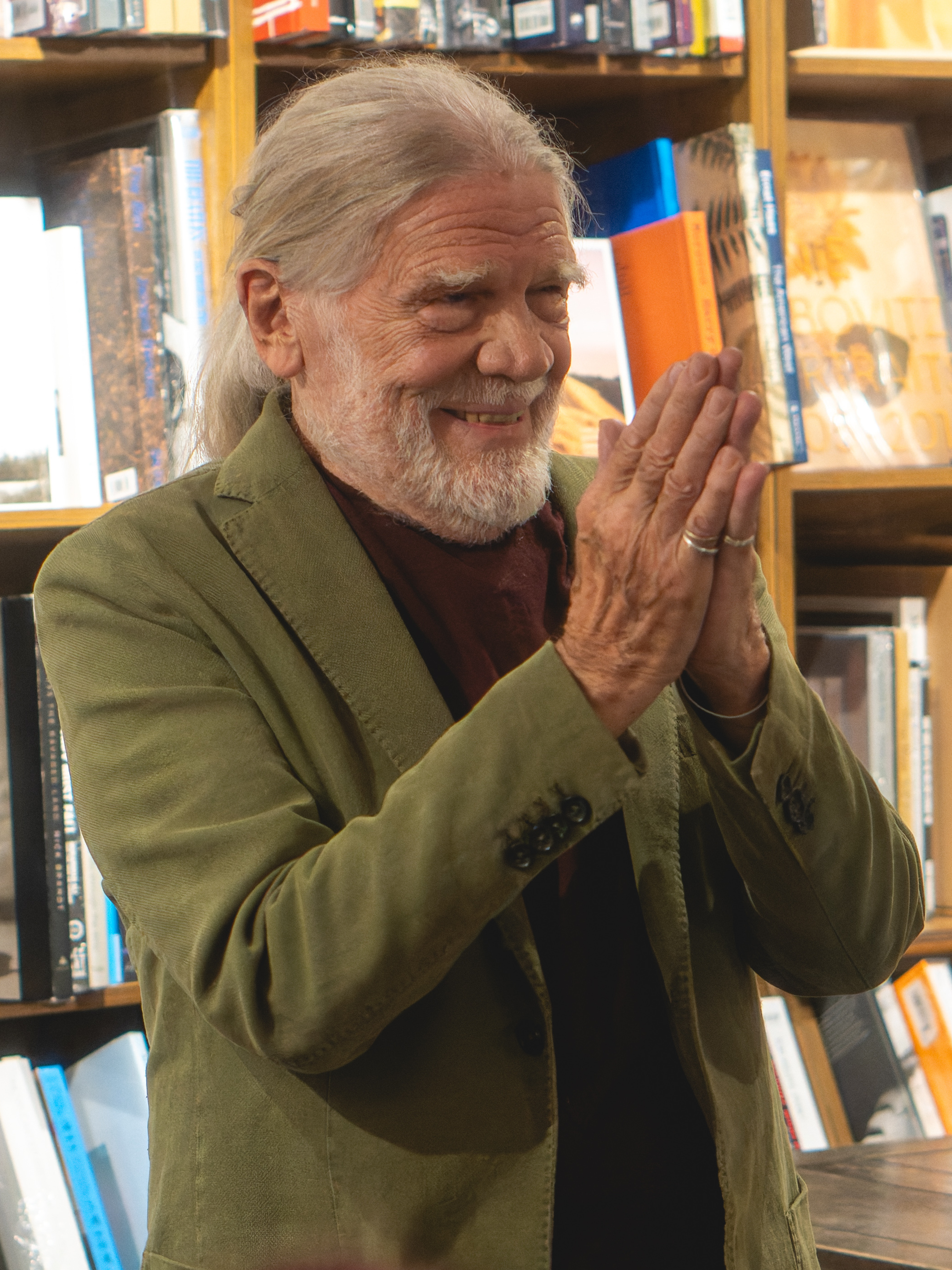
- Diltz in 2024
- Born: Henry Stanford Diltz; September 6, 1938 (age 87); Kansas City, Missouri, US
- Occupation: Photographer
- Known for: Music photography
- Website: henrydiltz.com

Henry Stanford Diltz (born September 6, 1938, in Kansas City, Missouri) is an American folk musician and photographer who has been active since the 1960s.

== Career ==
=== Photography ===
Among the bands Diltz played with was the Modern Folk Quartet. While a member of the Modern Folk Quartet, Diltz became interested in photography, met The Monkees, played on some of their recording sessions, and took numerous photographs of the band, many of which have been published.

His work also attracted the eye of other musicians who needed publicity and album cover photos. He was the official photographer at Woodstock, and at the Monterey Pop Festival and Miami Pop Festival, and has photographed "over 250 album covers".

Diltz photographed 1960s folk-rock stars who lived in Los Angeles's Laurel Canyon, which at the time was a center of American music. Many rising stars were drawn to the neighborhood. Diltz recalled: "There was a sense of brotherhood in all of this - in the music scene, in Laurel Canyon, certainly at Woodstock. But all the people I photographed: I love their music."

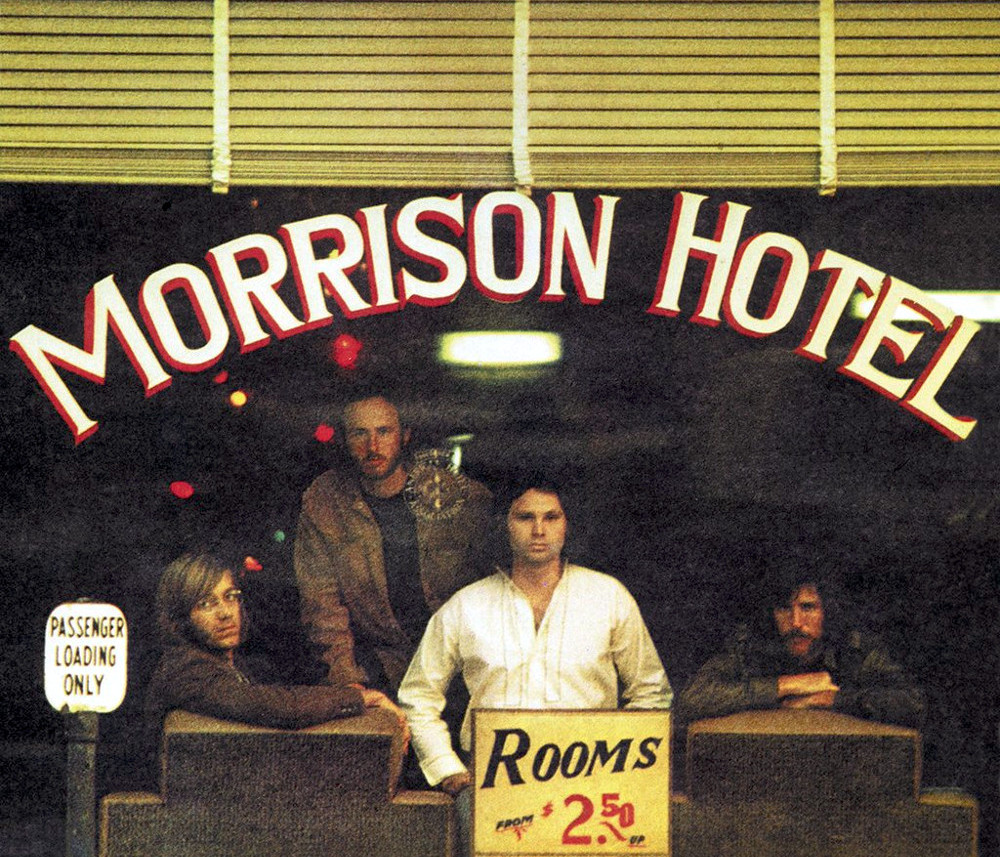
Photo of The Doors by Henry Diltz, used on the cover of Morrison Hotel.

One of Diltz's most notable works is the photo of The Doors that was used on their 1970 album Morrison Hotel. The album cover photograph was taken at the Morrison Hotel on South Hope Street in Downtown Los Angeles. The band were not given permission to photograph, so they did it while the clerk was called away from the desk. The building was destroyed by a fire on December 26, 2024.

Other notable album covers featuring Diltz's photographs are James Taylor's Sweet Baby James; the Eagles' eponymous debut album and Desperado; and the eponymous debut album by Crosby, Stills & Nash.

=== Later works ===
Diltz contributed all the photographs to the 1978 book California Rock, California Sound, which archived the Los Angeles music scene of the 1970s. British writer Anthony Fawcett provided the bulk of the text. He also has a book titled California Dreaming, from Genesis Publications UK. The self-published Unpainted Faces book of black and white photographs was released through Morrison Hotel Gallery.

Diltz is co-founder along with Peter Blachley and Rich Horowitz of the Morrison Hotel Gallery in SoHo, New York City, and in West Hollywood. The galleries specialize in fine-art music photography, including his own works.

Diltz is still active, including a role as contributing photographer to The Henry Rollins Show. He was among the 43 photographers invited to donate a print to "FOCUS: an auction of the finest photography to benefit City Harvest...." The fund-raiser was on September 18, 2008, supported City Harvest, a food collection bank in New York City. In 2025 he appeared as himself in Spinal Tap II: The End Continues, photographing the band.

In 2023, Diltz received the lifetime achievement prize at the Abbey Road Music Photography Awards.

== Personal life ==
In 1971, he and songwriter Jimmy Webb nearly died in a glider aircraft accident. Webb was piloting and Diltz was shooting 35 mm motion picture film from the rear seat. Both suffered significant injuries. The film did not survive.

== Discography with the Modern Folk Quartet ==
=== Singles ===
- Road to Freedom / It Was a Very Good Year (9/1963)
- The Love of a Clown / If All You Think (10/1964)
- Every Minute of Every Day / That's Alright with Me (4/1965)
- This Could Be the Night (11/1965)
- Night Time Girl / Lifetime (3/1966)
- Don't You Wonder / I Had a Dream Last Night (5/1968)

=== Albums ===
- The Modern Folk Quartet (1963)
- Changes (1964)
