= Waiting for the Sun (The Doors song) =

Song by the Doors

from the album Morrison Hotel
- B-side: "Peace Frog"
- Released: February 9, 1970
- Recorded: November 1969 – January 1970
- Studio: Elektra, Los Angeles
- Genre: Psychedelic rock
- Length: 3:58
- Label: Elektra
- Songwriter: Jim Morrison
- Producer: Paul A. Rothchild

"Waiting for the Sun" is a song by the American rock band the Doors. It was written by lead singer Jim Morrison and featured as the second track on their 1970 album Morrison Hotel. The song is often mistakenly believed to be the title track off their 1968 album of the same name.

== Recording and release ==
The song was written during the sessions for the band's third studio album and was originally meant to serve as the title track. The band realized they needed to continue working on the song but kept the album's title due to their fondness for it. After the poor reception of their fourth studio album, The Soft Parade, the band brought back the song as a way to return to their beginnings.

The song deals with themes of longing and the arrival of something new or beautiful, with lyrics such as "At first flash of Eden / We race down to the sea" and "Waiting for you to tell me what went wrong". It marks a return to the band's more psychedelic instrumentation in contrast to the blues-oriented sound they had adopted for other tracks on Morrison Hotel.

The song was not released as a single in the United States, although it was released as one in both Germany and the Netherlands in 1971, where it had "Peace Frog" as its B-side.

== Reception ==
Despite not being released as a single "Waiting for the Sun" is considered one of the Doors' best songs for its haunting composition and lyrics, with it gaining mostly positive reviews from critics.

== Personnel ==
According to the 2007 Rhino Records CD 40th Anniversary Edition liner notes.

- Jim Morrison – vocals
- Ray Manzarek – keyboard
- Robby Krieger – guitar
- John Densmore – drums
- Ray Neopolitan – bass guitar
- Paul Beaver – Moog synthesizer programming

== Charts ==
Weekly chart performance for "Waiting for the Sun"
Chart (1970–1971)	Peak position
Netherlands (Single Top 100)	14
Belgium (Ultratop 50 Wallonia)	44
