= Morrison Hotel =

Studio album by the Doors
- Released: February 9, 1970
- Recorded: August 19, 1966 ("Indian Summer"); November 1969 - January 1970
- Studios: Elektra, Hollywood
- Genres: Blues rock; psychedelia; R&B
- Length: 37:05
- Label: Elektra
- Producer: Paul A. Rothchild

The Doors chronology
The Soft Parade (1969)	Morrison Hotel (1970)	Absolutely Live (1970)

Singles from Morrison Hotel
- 1. "You Make Me Real" / "Roadhouse Blues" Released: February 1970

Morrison Hotel is the fifth studio album by American rock band the Doors, released on February 9, 1970, by Elektra Records. After the use of brass and string arrangements recommended by producer Paul A. Rothchild on their previous album, The Soft Parade (1969), the Doors returned to their blues rock style and this album was largely seen as a return to form for the band.

The group entered Elektra Sound Recorders in Los Angeles in November 1969 to record the album, which is divided into two separately titled sides: "Hard Rock Café" and "Morrison Hotel". Blues rock guitar pioneer Lonnie Mack and Ray Neapolitan contributed to the album as session bassists.

The album reached No. 4 on the Billboard 200, and performed better overseas than the preceding album (it was the group's highest-charting studio album in the United Kingdom, where it peaked at No. 12). The accompanying "You Make Me Real" / "Roadhouse Blues" single peaked at No. 50 in May 1970 on the Billboard 100 chart. The cover photo was taken by Henry Diltz.

== Background ==
On March 1, 1969, Jim Morrison performed while intoxicated at the Dinner Key Auditorium in Coconut Grove, Florida, in front of a crowd of nearly 12,000; he was charged for his performance and behavior with indecent exposure, on April 4. The incident negatively reflected on the band's publicity, sparking a "March for Decency" at the Miami Orange Bowl.

Consequently, 25 dates on the band's next tour were canceled, and their records were blacklisted from radio airplay, resulting in the band abandoning the rest of their potential tour, costing what John Densmore characterized as "a million dollars in gigs." Nevertheless, the band gradually regained momentum by playing concerts throughout the rest of the year, including the Toronto Rock and Roll Revival; they played alongside John Lennon, among others, who later said, "supposedly the Doors were top of the bill."

In July, the Doors had released their fourth album, The Soft Parade, a heavily orchestrated affair that augmented the band's sound with horns and strings. Around early 1969, Morrison traded in his stage leathers for more conventional attire, grew a beard and gained weight as he attempted to live down his "Lizard King" image; however, his worsening alcoholism often undermined his efforts.

In November, a drunken Morrison caused such a disturbance on a flight to Phoenix, Arizona, to see a Rolling Stones concert that he was charged with a new skyjacking law that carried up to a $10,000 fine and a ten-year prison sentence.

== Recording and composition ==
Morrison Hotel's back-to-basics approach largely stemmed from the group's dismay over the protracted sessions for The Soft Parade, which took nine months to record and cost $86,000 (equal to $755,036 today), far more expensive than any previous Doors record. The band had also been stung by the critical reception to the record. On Morrison Hotel, there is a slight steer toward blues, which would be fully explored by the band on their next album L.A. Woman. Morrison Hotel was recorded between November 1969 and January 1970, with the exception of "Indian Summer", which was recorded on August 19, 1966 for The Doors, while "Waiting for the Sun" actually originated during the sessions for the band's third album.

Although Morrison Hotel contains no major hit singles, it features some of the band's most popular songs, including "Roadhouse Blues" and "Peace Frog", which would go on to become staples of classic rock radio. "Roadhouse Blues" took two days to record (November 4–5, 1969) with Paul Rothchild striving for perfection. Several takes from these sessions were included on the 2006 remastered album, with Morrison repeating the phrase "Money beats soul" over and over again. The sessions only took off on the second day, when distinguished blues guitarist Lonnie Mack (also signed to Elektra Records) joined in on bass and former Lovin' Spoonful bandleader John Sebastian (appearing under the pseudonym G. Puglese to avoid breaching his Reprise Records recording contract) joined in on harmonica. Over the course of the session, keyboardist Ray Manzarek switched from his Wurlitzer electric piano to a tack piano.

The hook of "Peace Frog" is a distorted G5 chord played three times by Krieger, followed by a brief percussive wah-wah effect. Morrison, who took the words from a notebook entitled Abortion Stories, begins nearly every line with the word "blood", often referring to "Blood in the streets", which is perhaps "addressing the civic unrest then gripping the nation". A brief musical interlude is next, followed by a guitar solo, and a spoken word verse ("Indians scattered on dawn's highway bleeding / Ghosts crowd the young child's fragile eggshell mind"). The song ends with a final chord as it segues into the next track, "Blue Sunday".

"The Spy" and "Queen of the Highway" celebrate Morrison's intense but troubled relationship with longtime girlfriend Pamela Courson. Originally "The Spy" was called "Spy in the House of Love", as shown on the Master Reel Control File, a line borrowed from A Spy in the House of Love, a novel by Anaïs Nin published in 1954. Both songs are tinged with ambivalence; on "The Spy," Morrison cautions, "I know your deepest, secret fears", while on "Queen of the Highway" he sardonically concludes, "I hope it can continue a little while longer". According to the 1980 Doors biography No One Here Gets Out Alive, it was during the Morrison Hotel sessions that Morrison and Courson had a violent argument after she drank his bottle of liquor so he could not drink it, with engineer Bruce Botnick recalling: "So here were the two of them, completely out of their minds and crying. He started shaking her violently. I think he was putting me on. She was crying out of control, telling him he shouldn't drink anymore and that's why she drank it. And I'm cleaning up and I said, 'Hey man, it's pretty late.' He looked up, stopped shaking her, said, 'Yeah, right', hugged her and they walked out arm in arm ... he'd always give you a funny look afterward, to see your reaction."

== Album cover ==
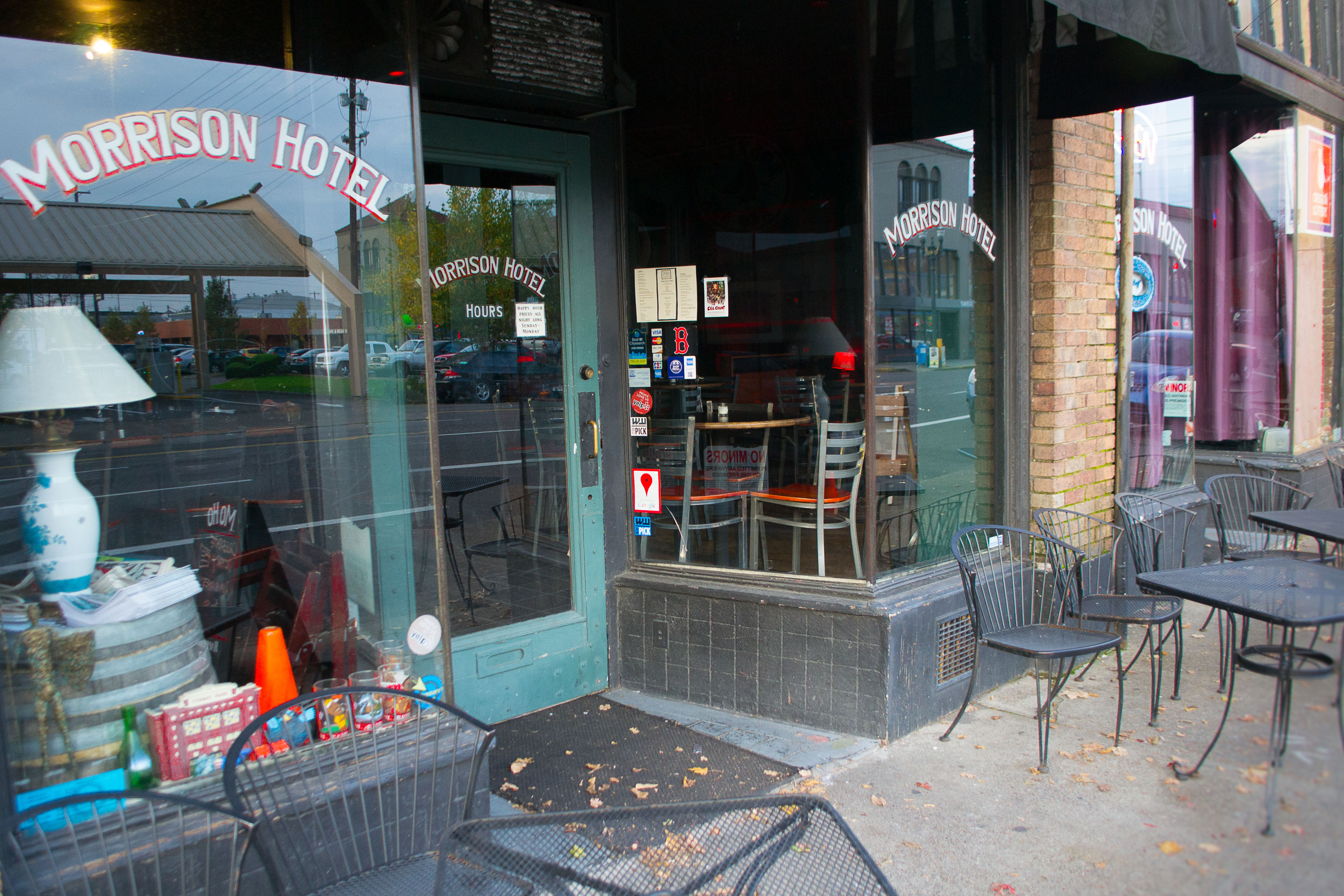
A mimicry of the Morrison Hotel building in 2012.

The cover photo was taken by Henry Diltz at the Morrison Hotel on South Hope Street in Downtown Los Angeles. The band were not given permission to photograph, so they did it while the clerk was called away from the desk. The band jumped right behind the windows and hit their places without shuffling as Diltz took the shot. The rear cover features a photograph of the Hard Rock Café at nearby 300 East 5th Street. The building is now home to a convenience store. It has been vacant for years. However, a new development plan to restore the building was announced in 2018, which happened for the annual "Day of the Doors" fan event in 2019. In early 1983, thirteen years after the album's release, parts of Michael Jackson's music video for the song "Beat It" were filmed inside the former Hard Rock Café on 5th Street. On December 26, 2024, the former Morrison Hotel building was severely damaged by fire. The cause is currently unknown.

== Release and reception ==
=== Initial release ===
Upon its release, Morrison Hotel was seen by many as a comeback for the Doors following the mixed critical reception of The Soft Parade. Although the accompanying "You Make Me Real" / "Roadhouse Blues" single only peaked at No. 50 in May 1970 despite strong FM radio play of the latter song, the album was immediately certified gold by RIAA in February 1970 (the band's fifth consecutive big album certification) before reaching No. 4 on the Billboard album chart in March during a 27-week stay. Additionally, it became the band's highest-charting studio album in the United Kingdom, where it peaked at No. 12.

Dave Marsh, the editor of Creem magazine, called the album "the most horrifying rock and roll I have ever heard. When they're good, they're simply unbeatable. I know this is the best record I've listened to ... so far", while Rock Magazine called it "without any doubt their ballsiest (and best) album to date". Circus praised it as "possibly the best album yet from the Doors" and "good, hard, evil rock ... and one of the best albums released this decade". Bruce Harris of Jazz & Pop lauded it as "one of the major musical events of Rock '70". On the other hand, Rolling Stone critic Lester Bangs was mixed, who praised some of the tracks, especially the "powerful blast of raw funk" opener "Roadhouse Blues" and "the buoyant catchiness" of "Land Ho!", but found the remainder of the album to be uneven and unsatisfying.

During this period, the de facto blacklisting continued to persist in more socially conservative markets, particularly the Deep South; consequently, the band's 1970 American tour itinerary was largely confined to the Northeast, West Coast and more progressive Midwestern cities amid ongoing (albeit more sporadic) cancellations, including planned concerts in Salt Lake City and at the Jesuit-operated Fairfield University.

=== Retrospective reviews ===
Professional ratings
Retrospective professional ratings
Aggregate scores
Source	Rating
Metacritic	78/100 (deluxe)
Review scores
Source	Rating
AllMusic	4.5/5 stars
Classic Rock	4.5/5 stars
Christgau's Record Guide	B+
Music Story	5/5 stars
The Rolling Stone Album Guide	5/5 stars
Slant Magazine	3/5 stars
Virgin Encyclopedia of Popular Music	4/5 stars

In his 1981 retrospective review, Robert Christgau rated Morrison Hotel "B+". He expressed his preference of the A side (Hard Rock Café) over the B side (Morrison Hotel), both lyrically and musically. He noted that the "band is rocking tighter than it ever has, Robbie Krieger's phrasing keeps things moving, and Morrison's gliding vocal presence–arty and self-absorbed though it may be–provides focus." The Rolling Stone Album Guide gave a perfect rating of five stars out of five, and considered it to be the Doors' "most cohesive record," adding that aside "from the throwaway grunter", "Maggie M'Gill", all the other songs were "masterful—and the band swings tougher and easier than they ever had before."

In more recent reviews, Thom Jurek of AllMusic expressed that the Doors employed blues and R&B "to some degree on all of their albums, but never as consistently, adeptly, or provocatively as they did on Morrison Hotel, with absolutely stunning results." Sal Cinquemani of Slant Magazine gave the record three stars out of five; he praised Morrison's vocals as "cleaner and clearer" than before, and hailed particularly "Peace Frog" as one of the greatest songs in the Doors catalogue. The 50th Anniversary Deluxe edition of Morrison Hotel holds currently a 78/100 approval rating based on 5 critic reviews on Metacritic, indicating "generally favorable reviews". In 2020, it was named one of "The Best Box Sets of the Year" by Rolling Stone.

== Track listing ==
=== Original album ===
Details are taken from the 1970 Elektra Records album and may differ from other sources.

Side one: Hard Rock Café
No.	Title	Writer(s)	Length
1.	"Roadhouse Blues"	Jim Morrison, music by the Doors	4:04
2.	"Waiting for the Sun"	Morrison	3:58
3.	"You Make Me Real"	Morrison	2:50
4.	"Peace Frog"	Morrison, Robby Krieger	2:52
5.	"Blue Sunday"	Morrison	2:08
6.	"Ship of Fools"	Morrison, Krieger	3:06
Total length:			18:58

Side two: Morrison Hotel
No.	Title	Writer(s)	Length
1.	"Land Ho!"	Morrison, Krieger	4:08
2.	"The Spy"	Morrison	4:15
3.	"Queen of the Highway"	Morrison, Krieger	2:47
4.	"Indian Summer"	Morrison, Krieger	2:33
5.	"Maggie M'Gill"	Morrison, music by the Doors	4:24
Total length:			18:07

=== Reissues ===
40th Anniversary bonus tracks
No.	Title	Writer(s)	Length
12.	"Talking Blues"	Morrison	0:59
13.	"Roadhouse Blues" (takes 1–3, recorded November 4, 1969)	Morrison, music by the Doors	8:47
14.	"Roadhouse Blues" (take 6, recorded November 4, 1969)	Morrison, music by the Doors	9:26
15.	"Carol" (recorded November 4, 1969)	Chuck Berry	0:56
16.	"Roadhouse Blues" (take 1, recorded November 5, 1969)	Morrison, music by the Doors	4:32
17.	"Money Beats Soul" (recorded November 5, 1969)	Morrison	1:04
18.	"Roadhouse Blues" (takes 13–15, recorded November 5, 1969)	Morrison, music by the Doors	6:21
19.	"Peace Frog / Blue Sunday" (false starts & dialogue)	Morrison, Krieger	2:00
20.	"The Spy" (version 2)	Morrison	3:48
21.	"Queen of the Highway" (jazz version)	Morrison, Krieger	3:36

50th Anniversary second CD: Mysterious Union – bonus tracks
No.	Title	Writer(s)	Length
1.	"Queen of the Highway" (take 1; recorded November 15, 1969)	Morrison, Krieger	1:13
2.	"Queen of the Highway" (various takes; recorded November 15, 1969)	Morrison, Krieger	6:23
3.	"Queen of the Highway" (take 44, recorded November 15, 1969)	Morrison, Krieger	3:17
4.	"Queen of the Highway" (take 12, recorded January 16, 1969)	Morrison, Krieger	5:05
5.	"Queen of the Highway" (take 14 - Krieger guitar overdub, recorded January 16, 1970)	Morrison, Krieger	4:03
6.	"Queen of the Highway" (take 1)	Morrison, Krieger	4:31
7.	"Queen of the Highway" (takes 5, 6 & 9)	Morrison, Krieger	1:01
8.	"Queen of the Highway" (take 14)	Morrison, Krieger	4:04
9.	"I Will Never Be Untrue"	Morrison	1:22
10.	"Queen of the Highway" (take unknown)	Morrison, Krieger	1:03
11.	"Roadhouse Blues" (take 14, recorded November 4, 1969)	Morrison	5:15
12.	"Money (That’s What I Want)" (recorded November 4, 1969)	Janie Bradford, Berry Gordy	3:40
13.	"Rock Me" (recorded November 4, 1969)	Muddy Waters	6:04
14.	"Roadhouse Blues" (takes 6 & 7, recorded November 5, 1969)	Morrison	5:11
15.	"Roadhouse Blues" (take 8, recorded November 5, 1969)	Morrison	5:48
16.	"Roadhouse Blues" (takes 1 & 2)	Morrison	5:00
17.	"Roadhouse Blues" (takes 5, 6 & 14)	Morrison	4:07
18.	"Peace Frog / Blue Sunday" (take 4)	Morrison, Krieger	5:43
19.	"Peace Frog" (take 12)	Morrison, Krieger	3:39

== Personnel ==
Details are taken from the 2007 Rhino Records CD 40th Anniversary Edition liner notes with Bruce Botnick's and David Fricke's accompanying essays, which may differ from other sources.

The Doors

- Jim Morrison – vocals
- Robby Krieger – guitar
- Ray Manzarek – piano, organ; guitar on "Maggie M'Gill"
- John Densmore – drums

Additional musicians

- Ray Neopolitan – bass
- Lonnie Mack – bass on "Roadhouse Blues" and "Maggie M'Gill"
- John Sebastian (credited as "G. Puglese") – harmonica on "Roadhouse Blues"

Technical

- Paul A. Rothchild – production
- Bruce Botnick – engineering
- Gary Burden – art direction, sleeve design
- Henry Diltz – sleeve photography
- Paul Beaver – Moog synthesizer programming on "Waiting for the Sun"

== Charts ==
Chart (1970)	Peak position
Canada (RPM Top 100)	3
Dutch Albums (Album Top 100)	6
Norwegian Albums (VG-lista)	13
UK Albums (Official Charts)	12
US Billboard 200	4

Chart (2020)	Peak position
Belgian Albums (Ultratop Wallonia)	124
Hungarian Albums (MAHASZ)	12
Swiss Albums (Schweizer Hitparade)	83

Chart (2021)	Peak position
Belgian Albums (Ultratop Flanders)	70
Portuguese Albums (AFP)	40

== Certifications ==
Region	Certification	Certified units/sales
Austria (IFPI Austria)	Gold	25,000^{*}
Australia (ARIA)	2× Platinum	140,000^{^}
Canada (Music Canada)	Platinum	100,000^{^}
France (SNEP)	Platinum	300,000^{*}
Italy (FIMI)	Gold	25,000^{‡}
Spain (Promusicae)	Platinum	100,000^{^}
Switzerland (IFPI Switzerland)	Gold	25,000^{^}
United Kingdom (BPI) 2007 release	Gold	100,000^{*}
United States (RIAA)	Platinum	1,000,000^{^}
^{*} Sales figures based on certification alone.^{^} Shipments figures based on certification alone.^{‡} Sales+streaming figures based on certification alone.

== See also ==
- Outline of the Doors
