= Judy Henske =

American singer-songwriter (1936–2022)

Background information
- Born: Judith Anne Henske; December 20, 1936; Chippewa Falls, Wisconsin, U.S.
- Died: April 27, 2022 (aged 85) Los Angeles, California, U.S.
- Occupations: Singer, songwriter
- Instrument: Vocals

Judith Anne Henske (December 20, 1936 – April 27, 2022) was an American singer and songwriter, dubbed "the Queen of the Beatniks" by producer Jack Nitzsche. Initially performing in folk clubs in the early 1960s, her performances and recordings embraced blues, jazz, show tunes, and humorous material. Her 1963 recording of "High Flying Bird" was influential on folk-rock, and her 1969 album Farewell Aldebaran, with her then husband Jerry Yester, was an eclectic "fusion of folk music, psychedelia, and arty pop".

== Life and career ==
Henske was born in Chippewa Falls, Wisconsin. She attended Notre Dame Grade School and Notre Dame-McDonell Memorial High School, and then Rosary College, River Forest, Illinois, before studying at the University of Wisconsin–Madison. She then worked in Ohio, before moving to Philadelphia, Pennsylvania, where she worked as a cook in a Quaker co-operative.

Around 1959, she relocated to San Diego, California, where she lived on a sloop in the yacht basin. Over 6 feet tall, with a "booming voice", her style was influenced by Sophie Tucker, Peggy Lee, and Odetta. A guest shot on ABC-TV's Hootenanny gave her young career a boost, after which she began singing in coffee houses in Pacific Beach, San Diego, and Los Angeles, where she worked with, among others, Lenny Bruce. She then moved on to Oklahoma City, before joining ex-Kingston Trio member Dave Guard and the Whiskeyhill Singers in 1961 in Menlo Park, California, recording an album.

After the Whiskeyhill Singers disbanded, she returned to Hollywood. Henske appeared as a performer in the 1963 exploitation movie Hootenanny Hoot at the height of the folk-music craze and performed memorable versions of "The Ballad of Little Romy" and "Wade in the Water". She also performed "God Bless the Child" on an early episode of The Judy Garland Show, and was offered a regular role on the show but turned it down.

Through her manager, Herb Cohen, she gained the attention of Jac Holzman and Elektra Records, for whom she made two solo albums. The first of these, a recording of a nightclub performance, highlighted the offbeat humor in her live performances with musical arrangements by Onzy Matthews; the second featured Billy Edd Wheeler's song "High Flying Bird", a minor hit in 1963 that was later covered by many bands of the era, including Jefferson Airplane and Zephyr. During this time, she worked extensively in New York as a solo singer, and shared the stage with Woody Allen, among others. Her relationship with Allen is said to have informed the script of Annie Hall, which includes a character from Chippewa Falls similar to Henske.

Henske married musician Jerry Yester in 1963, and continued to work, appearing in Anita Loos' musical "Gogo Loves You" in Greenwich Village in 1964 at the Theatre de Lys, in which her performance was praised as "utterly delightful," as well as singing at many New York and East Coast clubs. Henske said: "I liked when people were engaged, and they show it with laughter and not just clapping. It didn't sound like people just sitting lifeless in their seats, admiring you. It was alive." Henske was noted by music writers for her strong, bluesy voice and emotive performances. In February 1964, Henske was interviewed about her life and music on Folk Music Worldwide, an international short-wave radio station in New York City.

She returned to the East Coast when Yester joined The Lovin' Spoonful. After a failed attempt in the mid-60s by Mercury Records to present her as an all-round entertainer, she and Yester moved back to Laurel Canyon. She recorded another live album, The Death Defying Judy Henske, and several singles arranged and produced by Jack Nitzsche, including a version of Fred Neil's "The Dolphins" (as "Dolphins in the Sea").

In 1969, she returned to music with Yester, making the baroque/psychedelic folk album Farewell Aldebaran for Frank Zappa’s Straight Records. The pair then formed a band, Rosebud, making another album before they separated. They divorced in 1971 and Henske married musician Craig Doerge in 1973. Together Henske and Doerge wrote "Yellow Beach Umbrella," the lead single from Doerge's debut LP, also recorded by Three Dog Night on their 1976 LP American Pastime and by Bette Midler on her 1977 LP Broken Blossom.

After a longer period of retirement from public appearances, she returned to performing in Los Angeles clubs in the 1990s, as well as writing articles for the San Diego Reader and other journals. She released two further albums, Loose In the World (1999) and She Sang California (2004). In February 2007, Rhino Records issued a limited edition 2-CD compilation set of her recordings, Big Judy: How Far This Music Goes (1962–2004), covering her entire career.

She appeared in the 2011 documentary film Phil Ochs: There but for Fortune, which chronicles the life and career of folksinger Phil Ochs, with whom she was part of the early sixties' Greenwich Village folk music scene.

Henske and Doerge lived in Pasadena, California, where they wrote and recorded. She died on April 27, 2022, at the age of 85, after a long illness.

== In popular culture ==
Crime writer Andrew Vachss was a fan of Henske and promoted her music in some of his novels. In Blue Belle, he wrote: "If Linda Ronstadt's a torch singer, Henske's a flame thrower."

Henske appears as a character in the 2026 novel Red Sheet by James Ellroy.

== Discography ==
=== Albums ===
- Coffee House, 1959 (Dorian 1001) various artists - 4 Henske tracks.
- Dave Guard and the Whiskeyhill Singers, 1962 (Capitol T/ST-1728) (as member of group)
- How the West Was Won (soundtrack to the film, as member of group singing "900 Miles" and "Ox Driver's Song")
- The Original Hootenanny, 1963 (Crestview CRS-7806) Crestview was a Division of Elektra Records. One track, "Wade in the Water", recorded live.
- Judy Henske, 1963 (Elektra EKS-7231)
- High Flying Bird, 1964 (Elektra EKS-7241)
- Little Bit of Sunshine… Little Bit of Rain, 1965 (Mercury SR 61010/MG 21010)
- The Death Defying Judy Henske, 1966 (Reprise R/RS-6203)
- Farewell Aldebaran, 1969 (with Jerry Yester) (Straight Records STS-1052/Reprise Records RS-6388)
- Rosebud, 1971 (as member of group) (Reprise RS 6426)
- Loose in the World, 1999 (Fair Star Music)
- She Sang California, 2004 (Fair Star Music)
- Big Judy: How Far This Music Goes, 1962–2004 (box set) 2007 (Rhino Handmade)

=== Singles ===
- "That's Enough"/"Oh, Didn't He Ramble", 1962 (Staccato 101 and Gold Leaf 1001). Credited to Judy Hart
- Rider! 1963 (Capitol) The Kingston Trio album Sunny Side
- "I Know You Rider"/"Love Henry", 1963 (Elektra 45004)
- "Charlotte Town"/"High Flying Bird", 1963 (Elektra 45007)
- "Til The Real Thing Comes Along"/"Lonely Train", 1963 (Elektra 45010)
- "Crazy He Calls Me"/"Baby", 1965 (Mercury 72387)
- "Bye-Bye Blackbird"/"Let The Good Times Roll" 1966 (Reprise 0458)
- "Road to Nowhere"/"Sing A Rainbow", 1966 (Reprise 0485)
- "Day To Day"/"Dolphins in the Sea", 1966 (Reprise 0587)
- "Snowblind"/"Horses on a Stick", 1970 (Straight STS 102) with Jerry Yester
