= Modern Folk Quartet =

American folk music group

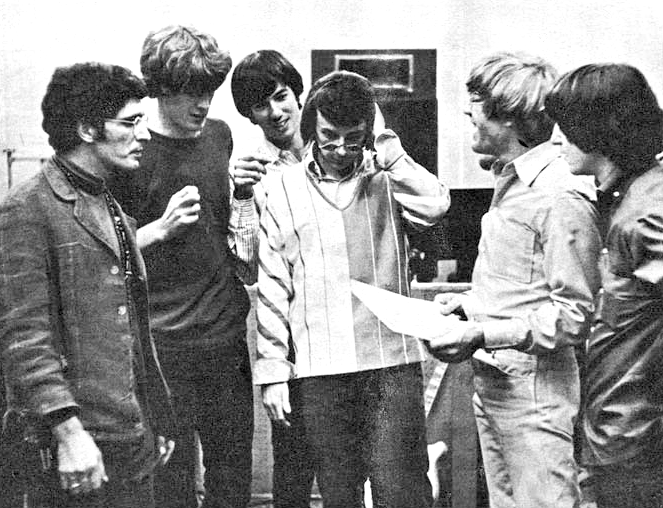
- The Modern Folk Quartet at Gold Star Studios in 1965 with producer Phil Spector (center)

Background information
- Also known as: MFQ, Modern Folk Quintet
- Origin: Honolulu, Hawaii, U.S.
- Genres: Folk, folk rock
- Years active: 1962–1966; 1975–1978; 1985–1991; 2003
- Labels: Warner Bros., Dunhill
- Past members: Cyrus Faryar; Henry Diltz; Chip Douglas; Stan White; Jerry Yester; Eddie Hoh; Jim Yester

The Modern Folk Quartet (or MFQ) was an American folk music revival group that formed in the early 1960s. Originally emphasizing acoustic instruments and group harmonies, they performed extensively and recorded two albums. In 1965, as the Modern Folk Quintet, they ventured into electric folk rock and recorded with producers Phil Spector and Jack Nitzsche. Although MFQ received a fair amount of exposure, their rock-oriented recordings failed to capture their sound or generate enough interest and they disbanded in 1966. Subsequently, MFQ re-formed several times and made further recordings.

== Early career ==
Cyrus Faryar, Henry Diltz, Chip Douglas, and Stan White formed the quartet in Honolulu, Hawaii in 1962, after Faryar had returned from the mainland U.S. after a period singing with Dave Guard's Whiskeyhill Singers. They took the name Modern Folk Quartet as a conscious parallel with the Modern Jazz Quartet, who were known for their use of sophisticated counterpoint. The MFQ adopted a similar approach to vocalization; a fellow folk musician commented: "They were singing diminished, flatted ninths, jazz chords ... really advanced stuff".

The group moved to Los Angeles, where they became regulars at the Troubadour club. After White became ill, he was replaced by local singer-guitarist Jerry Yester, who had performed with the New Christy Minstrels and Les Baxter's Balladeers. Herb Cohen became their manager (later manager of Frank Zappa, Tim Buckley and others).

The quartet recorded their debut album in 1963. Simply titled The Modern Folk Quartet, it was produced by Jim Dickson (later manager of the Byrds) for Warner Brothers Records. MFQ performed with an array of popular folk group instruments, including guitar, banjo, ukulele, bass, and percussion, and four-part vocal harmonies. An album review called their material "a superbly chosen selection of concurrently new traditionals and original adaptations of standards from the folk music canon" that benefit from the group's fresh approach.

For much of 1963 to 1965, MFQ was based in New York City's Greenwich Village, then the center of the folk-music movement. They performed at clubs, such as the Bitter End, and "hundreds of college concerts". In November 1963, MFQ appeared in the Warner Bros. film, Palm Springs Weekend. During the sequence at Jack's Casino, they sing "The Ox Driver's Song" and a second unidentified song.

The group released a second album in 1964 for Warner Bros. titled Changes. A review noted "with an ear toward sustaining the fresh sound of their predecessor [album] they blend their arrangements and adaptations to another impressive lineup of modern compositions from the group's contemporaries". These include early songs written by Bob Dylan, Phil Ochs, John Stewart, and Chet Powers (aka Dino Valente). A third album for Warner Bros. was not forthcoming. Yester explained "we were on the road so much that when we were off, we didn't really want to work ... We basically performed with those two albums worth of material. I don't think we had enough for another album until we changed into folk-rock".

== Folk-rock period ==
We watched [the Beatles on The Ed Sullivan Show in February 1964], and it was like, this bolt of electricity went through everybody's brain. That was it. No more haircuts. ... The [MFQ] was like a tadpole that started growing legs, and then got arms. Chip [Douglas] got an electric bass, I got an electric guitar, and in less than a year, we were a rock band.

– Jerry Yester

In 1965, MFQ began exploring a rock sound. Faryar saw the progression "as a logical outcome of how we think. We would have had to change our whole mental attitude to stay where we were". He also admitted being influenced by other bands: "The Byrds whet our appetites for folk-rock. Whatever sweet music the Byrds came up with, they legitimized this transition from folk to folk-rock ... We had developed a rock set when we played with the Lovin' Spoonful at the Cafe Wha? in the [Greenwich] Village" (the Spoonful's John Sebastian sometimes also sat in on drums with the MFQ between playing sets at a nearby club).

Their first attempt to record rock was with producer Charles Calello. A single "Every Minute of Every Day", backed with "That's Alright with Me" was released in April 1965 by Warner Bros. It was largely unnoticed and Faryar felt that the material was wrong for them. The group moved back to Los Angeles and debuted their folk rock set at their old haunt, the Troubador. Faryar recalled reactions similar to Dylan's electric debut at the 1965 Newport Folk Festival:

People reeled aghast and some fled as I brought out my Rickenbacker and we were all suddenly electric and cranking out electric tunes. The folkies were largely horrified. There were a lot of purists there, into the whole Appalachian thing. So it took a little bit of time, but we gradually won people over.

The transition was complete in September 1965 when they added rock drummer Eddie Hoh and were renamed "officially the Modern Folk Quintet, but prefer[red] to be known as the MFQ". Producer Phil Spector became interested in the group. According to Henry Diltz, "we'd heard that Spector was looking for a folk-rock band ... The word was that he really wanted the Lovin' Spoonful, but he couldn't get them. So he came down to see us instead". Spector went as far as to join MFQ onstage at a local club with a twelve-string guitar and performed "Spanish Harlem" with the group. Soon he became a fixture in their lives:

We started going up to Spector's house every day. We'd spend two hours waiting around before he even appeared, and there were all these karate-type bodyguards hanging around. Eventually, he'd appear at the top of the stairs and say, 'Hi, guys!' He'd sit there with a twelve-string and we'd sing all kinds of songs. This went on for weeks.

Recording sessions at Gold Star Studios followed where they recorded "This Could Be the Night", cowritten by Spector and Harry Nilsson. The song bore Spector's Wall-of-Sound used on Beach Boys recordings, rather than a folk rock sound reminiscent of the Byrds with Terry Melcher. It was slated for release as their first single with the new lineup, but Spector became focused on Tina Turner and "River Deep – Mountain High" and "forgot all about the Modern Folk Quartet [sic]". Instead it was used as the theme to the rock concert film The Big TNT Show, the 1966 follow-up to the T.A.M.I. Show. Yester later commented "I never forgave him for the thing with the TNT Show [for which Spector was the musical director and associate producer]. We were supposed to be in it, because we were on his label, for god's sake. But we ended up being the entertainment for everybody while they were setting up for the next band".

The MFQ performed frequently at Hollywood clubs, such as the Whisky a Go Go and the Trip. They appeared with the Paul Butterfield Blues Band, Donovan, the Byrds, and the Mamas and the Papas. After Frank Zappa made some disparaging comments about New York, MFQ took the place of the Mothers of Invention at the Velvet Underground's Exploding Plastic Inevitable performances in Los Angeles. In early 1966, MFQ signed with Dunhill Records, where they recorded with producer Jack Nitzsche. "Night Time Girl", a song written by Al Kooper and Irwin Levine, has been described as raga rock, with its eastern-sounding bouzouki accompaniment and sunshine pop/Mamas & the Papas-style vocals. The single reached number 122 on Billboard magazine's extended pop chart on April 16, 1966.

Despite their exposure at the clubs, an appearance on the television music variety show Shindig!, and more college dates, a breakthrough eluded them and they disbanded by July 1966. Band members felt that the material and direction given to them by record producers were partly to blame. According to Faryar: "I think Herbie [Cohen, their manager] steered us into some situations, like with Charlie Calello, where they wanted us to think this kind of song, they wanted us to think that kind of song, and we did not thrive in the hands of that kind of direction. We were most successful inventing our own stuff". Yester added: "I wished we would have recorded that [a folk-rock album], but we never did. The group didn't embrace original material as readily as I thought it should have. If we would have stuck with Chip's and my songs, we would have gotten further in the folk-rock days".

== Later years ==
Two years after MFQ disbanded, a second Dunhill MFQ single, the double A-side "Don't You Wonder" backed with "I Had a Dream Last Night", was released in 1968. The various members went on to develop their own careers. They re-formed between 1975 and 1978, and they released a third album "Live at The Ice House 1978, and again in the 1980s, again becoming the Modern Folk Quintet when Yester's brother Jim, formerly of the Association, joined in 1988. After a 12-year break they reformed again in 2003 for a tour of Japan, where they have remained popular.

== Discography ==
On MFQ's singles releases, the group is variously listed as "Modern Folk Quartet", "M.F.Q.", "MFQ", "Modern Folk Quintet", and "the MFQ".

=== Singles ===
- "Road to Freedom" / "It Was a Very Good Year" (9/1963)
- "The Love of a Clown" / "If All You Think" (10/1964)
- "Every Minute of Every Day" / "That's Alright with Me" (4/1965)
- "This Could Be the Night" (11/1965)
- "Night Time Girl" / "Lifetime" (3/1966)
- "Don't You Wonder" / "I Had a Dream Last Night" (5/1968)
- "Together to Tomorrow" / "Keepin' the Dream Alive" (3/1990)

=== Albums ===
- The Modern Folk Quartet (1963)
- Changes (1964)
- Moonlight Seranade (1985)
- Live in Japan (1989)
- Bamboo Saloon (1990)
- MFQ Christmas (1990)
- MFQ Wolfgang (1991)
- Highway 70 (1995)
- Live at The Ice House 1978 (2005)
- MFQ Live Archive Series (2006)
- The Best of The Modern Folk Quartet - From 1963 To 1995 (2017)
