= Jerry Yester =

American folk-rock musician and producer (born 1943)

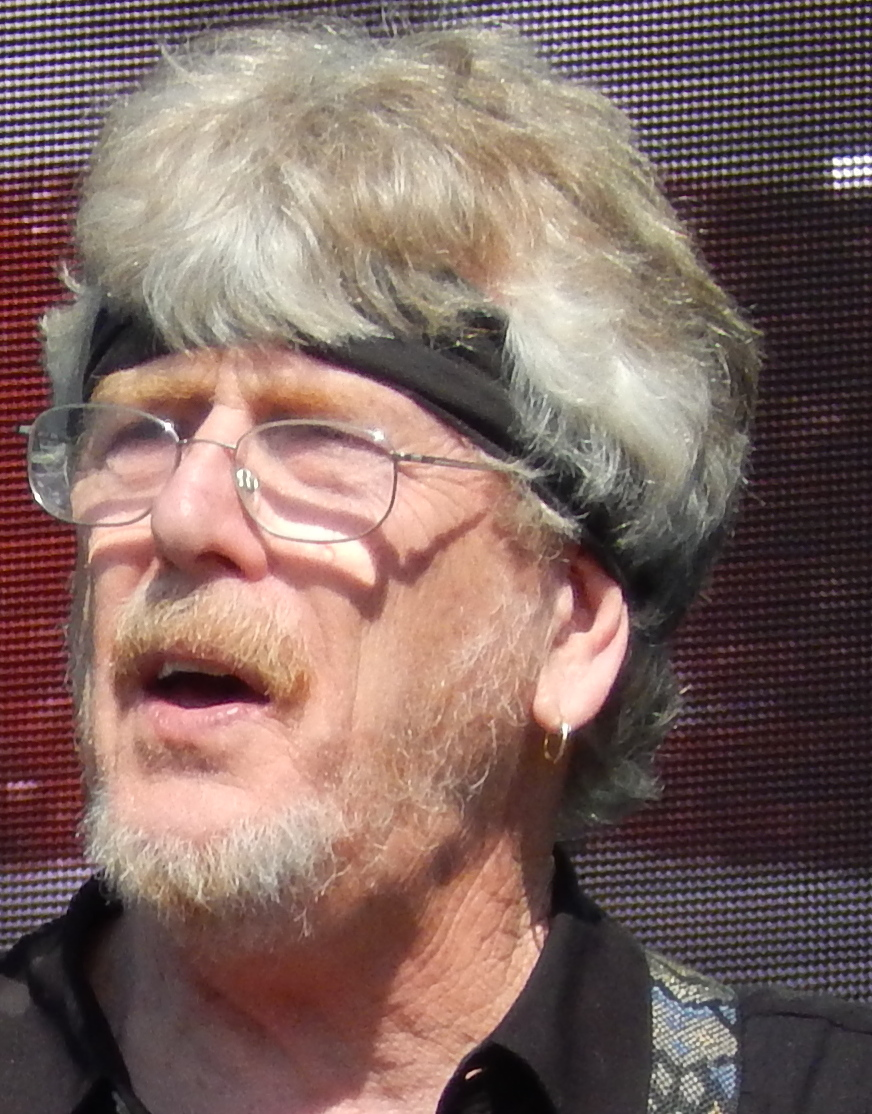
- Yester performing with the Lovin Spoonful in 2016

Background information
- Born: Jerome Alan Yester; January 9, 1943 (age 83); Birmingham, Alabama, U.S.
- Genres: Pop, folk
- Occupations: Musician, songwriter, record producer, arranger
- Instruments: guitar, vocals, keyboards, banjo
- Years active: 1960–2017
- Formerly of: The New Christy Minstrels, Modern Folk Quartet, The Lovin' Spoonful, Rosebud, The Association
- Spouse: Judy Henske (m. 1963; div. 1971)

Jerome Alan Yester (born January 9, 1943) is an American former folk rock musician, record producer, and arranger. Yester has been a member of several bands including The New Christy Minstrels, Modern Folk Quartet, The Association, Rosebud and The Lovin' Spoonful.

Yester started his career in 1960 performing with his brother Jim. He later joined The New Christy Minstrels and later Modern Folk Quartet, replacing member Stan White. Yester would later form Rosebud in the 1970s and tour with The Association in the 1980s.

Yester would play piano on the Lovin Spoonfuls debut single Do You Believe in Magic, he later became the Lovin' Spoonful's guitarist after Zal Yanovsky left the band in 1967, and recorded the album Everything Playing with the band that same year. The Spoonful broke up in 1969, Yester went on to be active in the music industry working on other projects during the time the band was split up. In 1991 he reunited with Joe Butler and Steve Boone to tour again as the Lovin Spoonful, playing guitar, keyboards and singing. Yester toured with the band until 2017.

Yester also has produced and arranged albums by many musicians and released two solo albums, Just Like the Big Time Only Smaller in 1990 and Pass Your Light around in 2017, as well as the album Farewell Aldebaran in 1969, where he collaborated with his wife Judy Henske.

== Biography ==
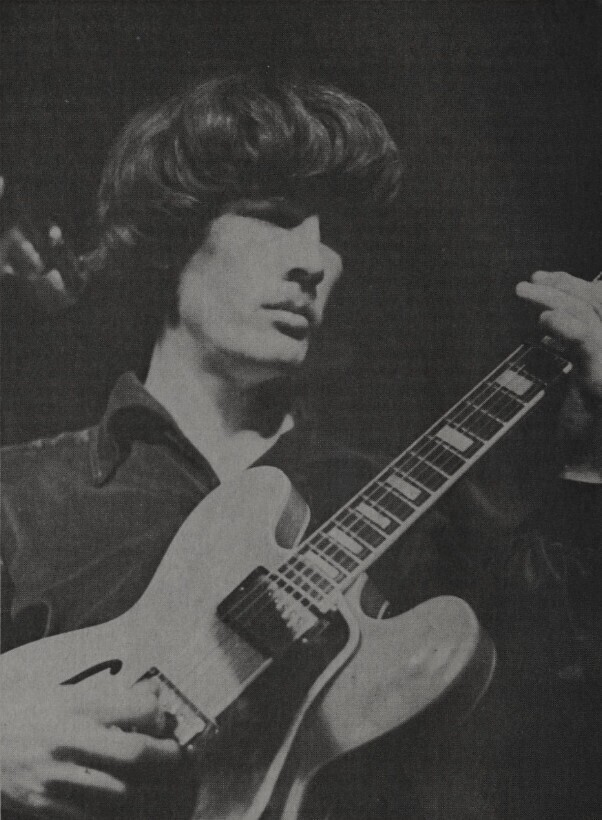
Yester in 1967

Yester was born in Birmingham, Alabama, United States, and grew up in Burbank, California. He formed a duo with brother Jim Yester, the Yester Brothers, and started playing folk clubs in Los Angeles in 1960. When Jim enlisted in the army, Jerry joined the New Christy Minstrels, and then, in 1963, the Modern Folk Quartet. The MFQ released two albums in the next two years, and Yester also branched out into other recordings, playing piano on the Lovin' Spoonful's "Do You Believe in Magic" in 1965.

The MFQ split up in 1966, and Yester began work as a solo artist and as a producer, with his wife Judy Henske, whom Yester married in 1963, his brother Jim's band the Association, the Turtles, and Tim Buckley, for whom he produced Goodbye and Hello and Happy Sad. The following year he joined the Lovin' Spoonful, replacing Zal Yanovsky, whom he also later worked with as producer. In 1969, Henske, Yester and Yanovsky put together the cult album Farewell Aldebaran, on which Yester played nearly a dozen different instruments. The following year Yester and Henske formed a new band, Rosebud, but the band dissolved in 1971; the couple then divorced.

Yester continued to work as a producer and/or arranger on albums by the Turtles, Pat Boone, Aztec Two Step, and Tom Waits, and in the 1970s, also performed with the Association and the re-formed Modern Folk Quartet. In the mid-1980s, he moved to Hawaii and formed a dance band called Rainbow Connection with his brother Jim, and Rainbow Rastasan (Rainbow Page). In 1988, the MFQ began periodic touring of Japan, and have since recorded seven CDs for Japanese labels, including one (Wolfgang) using the music of Wolfgang Amadeus Mozart.

In 1990, Yester released a solo album, Just Like Big Time Only Smaller.

In 1991, both Yester brothers joined a re-formed Lovin' Spoonful with Butler and Boone. Yester would sing some of the band's songs and play keyboards and guitar. Yester subsequently resided in the area of Harrison, Arkansas, where he produced and arranged in his own studio, Willow Sound. At Willow Studios Yester would produce the album Stick and Stones May Break My Bones but Names will Never Hurt Me by the No-Neck Blues Band at the studio in 2001.

On October 6, 2017, one day before Yester was arrested, he released a solo album titled Pass Your Light Around.

=== Legal issues ===
The Oklahoma attorney general's office began investigating Yester in 2017. On October 7, 2017, Yester was arrested for 30 counts of possession of child pornography in Arkansas and was released on a $35,000 bond. As a result of his arrest, he was dismissed from The Lovin' Spoonful; the band canceled several tour dates, until they found a replacement. In a statement Steve Boone and Joe Butler said they were shocked. The band eventually replaced Yester with keyboardist Murray Weinstock and resumed touring. Yester pleaded guilty to eight counts of distributing, possessing or viewing matter depicting sexually explicit conduct involving a child on October 9, 2018.

In July 2019, Yester was sentenced to two years in prison after his conviction for child pornography possession, and he was required to register as a sex offender.
