= The Late Great Tim Buckley =

Compilation album by Tim Buckley
- Released: 1978
- Recorded: 1967–1973
- Genre: Folk, experimental rock, funk, soul
- Label: WEA
- Producer: Compiled: R. Green

Tim Buckley chronology
Look at the Fool (1974)	The Late Great Tim Buckley (1978)	The Best of Tim Buckley (1983)

The Late Great Tim Buckley is a 1978 compilation LP by Tim Buckley. The album consists of recordings from five of Buckley's studio albums: Tim Buckley, Goodbye and Hello, Happy Sad, Greetings from L.A. and Sefronia. The compilation was the first Buckley LP to be released posthumously and was only released in Australia. It would be another 5 years until the next release, The Best of Tim Buckley, highlighting the decline of Buckley's popularity in the latter stages of his career before his death. The compilation provides a sparse overview of Buckley's career, omitting music from Lorca, Blue Afternoon and Starsailor and focusing instead on the more commercial periods of Buckley's recording years. The album is currently out of print.

== Track listing ==
All Songs By Tim Buckley unless noted otherwise:

1. "Aren't You The Girl"
2. "Understand Your Man"
3. "I Never Asked to Be Your Mountain"
4. "Once I Was"
5. "Morning Glory" (Buckley, Larry Beckett)
6. "Move With Me" (Buckley, Jerry Goldstein)
7. "Strange Feeling"
8. "Sweet Surrender"
9. "Make It Right" (Beckett, Buckley, Joe Falsia, Goldstein)
10. "Dolphins" (Fred Neil)
