= The Best of Tim Buckley =

1983 compilation album by Tim Buckley

Greatest hits album by Tim Buckley
- Released: November 1983
- Recorded: 1967–1969
- Genre: Folk
- Label: Rhino
- Producer: Jerry Yester, Zal Yanovsky, Tim Buckley, Denny Randell, Paul A. Rothchild, Jac Holzman

Tim Buckley chronology
The Late Great Tim Buckley (1978)	The Best of Tim Buckley (1983)	Dream Letter: Live in London 1968 (1990)

The Best of Tim Buckley is a compilation LP by Tim Buckley. It presents Buckley as a folk artist with songs written between 1966 and 1970. The album features material from the studio albums Tim Buckley, Goodbye and Hello, Happy Sad and Blue Afternoon, in addition to "Song to the Siren" from his avant garde album Starsailor. This was the first new release, outside of Australia after Buckley's death. The album provides an overview of Buckley's folk beginnings, excluding material from his later albums.

On October 2, 2006, the album was re-released, recompiled and remastered for a new retrospective. The new release featured a greater breadth of material from Buckley's career, including tracks from all of Buckley's studio albums. Reviews have been mixed, largely due to the problem of trying to give a retrospective of the artist while at the same time trying to include his most critically praised works.

== Track listing ==
All songs by Tim Buckley unless noted otherwise:

=== Side one ===
1. "Aren't You The Girl"
2. "Song for Janie"
3. "I Can't See You" (Larry Beckett, Buckley)
4. "Carnival Song"
5. "Goodbye and Hello" (Beckett, Buckley)
6. "Dolphins" (Fred Neil)

=== Side two ===
1. "Happy Time"
2. "I Must Have Been Blind"
3. "The River"
4. "Strange Feelin'"
5. "Song to the Siren"

== 2006 re-release ==
The Best of Tim Buckley: 2006 Rerelease

Greatest hits album by Tim Buckley
- Released: 2006
- Recorded: 1967–1974
- Genre: Folk, jazz, funk, soul
- Label: Rhino
- Producer: Bill Inglot

Tim Buckley chronology
The Dream Belongs to Me: Rare and Unreleased 1968 - 1973 (2001)	The Best of Tim Buckley: 2006 Rerelease (2006)	Tim Buckley: My Fleeting House (2007)

Professional ratings
Review scores
Source	Rating
AllMusic	3.5/5 stars
Classic Rock	7/10 stars

1. "Aren't You the Girl" - 2:05
2. "Song for Janie" - 2:46
3. "I Can't See You" (Beckett, Buckley) - 2:42
4. "Carnival Song" - 3:12
5. "Morning Glory" (Beckett, Buckley) - 2:52
6. "Goodbye and Hello" (Beckett, Buckley) - 8:40
7. "Sing a Song for You" [Take 11] - 5:44
8. "Once I Was" - 3:24
9. "Strange Feelin'" - 7:38
10. "I Had a Talk With My Woman" - 5:59
11. "Happy Time" - 3:14
12. "I Must Have Been Blind" - 3:45
13. "The River" - 5:47
14. "Song to the Siren" - 3:28
15. "Dolphins" (Fred Neil) - 3:13
16. "Martha" (Tom Waits) - 3:18
17. "Move With Me" (Buckley, Jerry Goldstein) - 4:52
18. "Look at the Fool" - 5:10
