= Thin Wires in the Voice =

Thin Wires In The Voice

EP by Tim Buckley
- Released: March 29, 1999
- Recorded: 1967–1968
- Genre: Folk rock
- Length: 22:10
- Label: Pid

Tim Buckley chronology
Honeyman: Live 1973 (1995)	Thin Wires In The Voice (1999)	Once I Was (1999)

Thin Wires In The Voice is a 120-page booklet written by Italian writer Luca Ferrari with a 3 track EP by Tim Buckley. The EP is a compilation of "Song to the Siren", featuring just Buckley's guitar and voice, recorded for the TV show The Monkees and two live recordings taken from a 1968 Danish radio broadcast. This earlier version of Starsailor track "Song to the Siren" is more folk-oriented and can also be found on Morning Glory: The Tim Buckley Anthology. The two live recordings are also found on Buckley's 1968 live album Copenhagen Tapes. The booklet is dual language appraisal of Tim Buckley in Italian and English. It also contains selected lyrics and poetry.

== Track listing ==
1. "Song to the Siren" (Larry Beckett, Tim Buckley) – 3:15
2. "Gypsy Woman" (Buckley) – 12:37
3. "Buzzin' Fly" (Buckley) – 6:28

== Personnel ==
Tracks 1–3

- Tim Buckley – guitar, vocals, 12-string guitar on "Song to the Siren"

Tracks 2–3

- Lee Underwood – guitar
- Niels-Henning Ørsted Pedersen – double bass
- David Friedman – vibraphone
