= Once I Was =

Compilation album by Tim Buckley
- Released: 1999
- Recorded: 2 April 1968–21 May 1974
- Genre: Experimental rock, folk, funk
- Length: 43:39
- Label: Varese
- Producer: Bernie Andrews

Tim Buckley chronology
Thin Wires In The Voice (1999)	Once I Was (1999)	Works in Progress (1999)

Professional ratings
Review scores
Source	Rating
Allmusic	link

Once I Was is a compilation album by Tim Buckley. The album features the Peel sessions recorded 1 April 1968, two tracks, "Honeyman" and "Dolphins", from a BBC broadcast of The Old Grey Whistle Test on 21 May 21, 1974 and finally "I Don't Need It to Rain" taken from the 12 October 1968 live show in Copenhagen. This collection features the same track listing as the Morning Glory compilation, with the sole difference being the inclusion "I Don't Need It to Rain". Buckley and his band are accompanied by famed Danish jazz double bassist Niels-Henning Ørsted Pedersen on this track due to the unavailability of Buckley's regular bassist for the 1968 European tour.

== Track listing ==
All songs Tim Buckley except where noted:

1. "Dolphins" (Fred Neil) – 3:11
2. "Honey Man" – 5:01
3. "Morning Glory" (Larry Beckett, Buckley) – 3:17
4. "Coming Home to You (Happy Time)" – 2:56
5. "Sing a Song for You" – 2:28
6. "Hallucinations/Troubadour" (Beckett, Buckley) – 10:35
7. "Once I Was" – 3:57
8. "I Don't Need It to Rain" – 12:14

== Personnel ==
- Tim Buckley – Guitar, Vocals

(Tracks 1 & 2 only)

- Charlie Whitney – Guitar
- Tim Hinkley – Bass
- Ian Wallace – Drums

(Tracks 3–7 only)

- Lee Underwood – Lead Guitar
- Carter Collins – Bongos
- Tony Carr – Drums

(Track 8 only)

- Lee Underwood – Lead Guitar
- Niels-Henning Ørsted Pedersen – Double Bass
- David Friedman – Vibes
