= Morning Glory (Tim Buckley album) =

Compilation album by Tim Buckley
- Released: July 28, 1994
- Recorded: April 1, 1968–1974
- Genre: Folk, soul
- Length: 31:25
- Label: Band of Joy
- Producer: Tracks 1–5: Bernie Andrews

Tim Buckley chronology
Peel Sessions (1991)	Morning Glory (1994)	Live at the Troubadour 1969 (1994)

Professional ratings
Review scores
Source	Rating
Allmusic	3/5 stars

Morning Glory is a compilation album by Tim Buckley. The album is a compilation of (see Buckley's 1968 Peel Sessions) and two further tracks ("Honeyman" and Fred Neil's "Dolphins") taken from the May 21, 1974, performance for, BBC TV music series, The Old Grey Whistle Test. The performance of "Dolphins" is also available as a video on 2007 DVD release Tim Buckley: My Fleeting House.

Morning Glory should not be confused with 2001 release Morning Glory: The Tim Buckley Anthology.

== Track listing ==
All songs by Tim Buckley unless stated otherwise: (* by Larry Beckett/Tim Buckley)

1. "Dolphins" (Fred Neil) – 3:11
2. "Honey Man"* – 5:01
3. "Morning Glory"* – 3:17
4. "Coming Home to You (Happy Time)"– 2:56
5. "Sing a Song for You" – 2:28
6. "Hallucinations/Troubadour"* – 10:35
7. "Once I Was" – 3:57

== Personnel ==
Tracks 1–2:

- Tim Buckley – Guitar, Vocals
- Charlie Whitney – Guitar
- Tim Hinkley – Bass
- Ian Wallace – Drums

Tracks 3–7:

- Tim Buckley – Guitar, Vocals
- Lee Underwood – Guitar
- Carter Collins – Percussion
- Tony Carr – Drums
