= Dream Letter: Live in London 1968 =

Live album by Tim Buckley
- Released: May 1990
- Recorded: London, October 7, 1968
- Genres: Folk; soft rock; jazz
- Length: 52:28 (Disc 1); 61:28 (Disc 2)
- Labels: Enigma Retro; Manifesto Records
- Producer: Bill Inglot

Tim Buckley chronology
The Best of Tim Buckley (1983)	Dream Letter: Live in London 1968 (1990)	Peel Sessions (1991)

Professional ratings
Review scores
Source	Rating
Allmusic	4.5/5 stars
Encyclopedia of Popular Music	4/5 stars
New Musical Express	9/10
Select	4/5

Dream Letter: Live in London 1968 is a live album by Tim Buckley. The album was recorded in Queen Elizabeth Hall, London, England on October 7, 1968 (mistakenly credited as being recorded on July 10 due to a confusion between American and British formatting of dates). Due to a lack of available funds Buckley was unable to tour with regular bass player John Miller and conga player Carter "C.C." Collins. The concert instead features bassist Danny Thompson (from British folk group Pentangle), guitarist Lee Underwood and vibraphone player David Friedman.

The concert features songs from Buckley's second album, Goodbye and Hello and the soon to be released Happy Sad. Also featured are the songs "Happy Time", which appeared on the 1969 album, Blue Afternoon, and a cover of Fred Neil's "Dolphins", which would appear on Sefronia in 1973. The "Carnival Song" which appears here is not the song of the same name from Goodbye and Hello, but an entirely different composition. Five other tracks from this set had, at the time of Dream Letter's release in 1990, never been heard on record before.

In 2000 it was listed number 756 in Colin Larkin's All Time Top 1000 Albums.

== Track listing ==
All tracks composed by Tim Buckley; except where indicated

Disc 1

1. "Introduction" – 1:06
2. "Buzzin' Fly" – 6:13
3. "Phantasmagoria in Two" – 4:41
4. "Morning Glory" (Larry Beckett, Buckley) – 3:43
5. "Dolphins" (Fred Neil) – 6:39
6. "I've Been Out Walking" – 8:18
7. "The Earth Is Broken" – 6:59
8. "Who Do You Love" – 9:27
9. "Pleasant Street/You Keep Me Hanging On" (Buckley; Holland, Dozier, Holland) – 7:58

Disc 2

1. "Love from Room 109/Strange Feelin'" – 12:18
2. "Carnival Song/Hi Lily, Hi Lo" (Buckley; Helen Deutsch) – 8:50
3. "Hallucinations" (Larry Beckett, Buckley) – 7:14
4. "Troubadour" – 6:04
5. "Dream Letter/Happy Time" – 9:25
6. "Wayfaring Stranger/You Got Me Runnin'" – 13:08 (Traditional; Buckley)
7. "Once I Was" – 4:29

== Personnel ==
- Tim Buckley – vocals, 12 string guitar
- Lee Underwood – guitar
- Danny Thompson – bass
- David Friedman – vibraphone

Introduction by Pete Drummond of BBC Radio 1.
