= The Dream Belongs to Me: Rare and Unreleased 1968–1973 =

Compilation album by Tim Buckley
- Released: May 7, 2001
- Recorded: March 1968–1973
- Genre: Folk rock, soul
- Length: 62:54
- Label: Manifesto
- Producer: Bill Inglot

Tim Buckley chronology
Morning Glory: The Tim Buckley Anthology (2001)	The Dream Belongs to Me: Rare and Unreleased 1968–1973 (2001)	Tim Buckley: My Fleeting House (2007)

Professional ratings
Review scores
Source	Rating
Allmusic	4/5 stars
Los Angeles Times	3/4 stars

The Dream Belongs to Me: Rare and Unreleased 1968 – 1973 is a compilation album by Tim Buckley. The album consists of three demo sessions, two recorded in 1968 and the other in 1973.

The first six tracks on the album are 1968 recordings of songs from Buckley's singer-songwriter period. They were previously released on Works in Progress. The majority of these compositions would later be re-recorded and released on Happy Sad, whilst two others, "Song to the Siren" and "Happy Time", would feature on Starsailor and Blue Afternoon respectively. "Ashbury Park" and "Danang" are early versions of Happy Sad's "Love from Room 109 at the Islander (On Pacific Coast Highway)". Here they appear as stand-alone tracks but would later form two interlinked parts upon the final Happy Sad track. The final 8 tracks are demo recordings for Buckley's 1973 album Sefronia. The demos appear much sparser in comparison to the more lushly produced final album versions.

The presentation of these two demo sessions in one album shows a stark contrast in style, from the earlier folk-influenced material to later funk and soul oriented works, and serves to underline the ever-changing nature of Buckley's music.

== Track listing ==
All songs by Tim Buckley except: * by Larry Beckett/Tim Buckley)

1. "Song to the Siren" * – 3:29
2. "Sing a Song for You" – 5:43
3. "Ashbury Park" – 2:48
4. "Danang" – 6:31
5. "Happy Time" – 3:12
6. "Buzzin' Fly" – 6:44
7. "Sefronia" * – 3:36
8. "Because Of You" * – 4:47
9. "The Dream Belongs to Me" – 4:56
10. "Falling Timber" – 4:44
11. "Stone In Love" – 3:00
12. "Freeway Dixieland Rocketship Blues" * – 4:40
13. "Honey Man" * – 2:59
14. "Quicksand" – 5:35
- Tracks 1,2,4,6 Recorded March 4/5, 1968 – Mayfair Studio New York, NY
- Tracks 3,5 Recorded June 17/18, 1968 – TTG Studios Hollywood, CA
- Tracks 7–14 Recorded February 12, 1973, Sunset Recording Studios Hollywood, CA
