= Peel Sessions (Tim Buckley album) =

Live album by Tim Buckley
- Released: 1 July 1991
- Recorded: London, United Kingdom, April 1, 1968
- Genre: Folk
- Length: 23:13
- Label: Dutch East India/Strange Fruit (1993 Release)
- Producer: Bernie Andrews/ Engineer: Pete Ritzema

Tim Buckley chronology
Dream Letter: Live in London 1968 (1990)	Peel Sessions (1991)	Morning Glory (1994)

Professional ratings
Review scores
Source	Rating
Allmusic	3.5/5 stars

Peel Sessions is a live album by Tim Buckley. It was recorded in studio 1 at 201 Piccadilly London, UK on 1 April 1968, as a session recording for BBC radio DJ John Peel. The session was subsequently broadcast six days later on 7 April 7, 1968. The session consists of folk-oriented songs from Buckley's Goodbye and Hello - Blue Afternoon period recorded in a sparse manner with only Tim's vocals, two guitars and percussion. Peel would later comment on this session as one that "defines essential music".

The five tracks from Peel Sessions would later appear on compilations Morning Glory and Once I Was, both supplemented with extra tracks.

== Track listing ==
All songs by Tim Buckley except: (* by Larry Beckett/Tim Buckley)

1. "Morning Glory"* - 3:17
2. "Coming Home To You (Happy Time)" - 2:56
3. "Sing a Song for You" - 2:28
4. "Hallucinations/Troubadour"* - 10:35
5. "Once I Was" - 3:57

== Personnel ==
- Tim Buckley – Guitar, Vocals
- Lee Underwood – Guitar
- Carter Collins – Bongos
- Tony Carr – Drums
