= Honeyman: Live 1973 =

Live album by Tim Buckley
- Released: November 1, 1995
- Recorded: New York City, November 27, 1973
- Genre: Experimental rock, funk, soul
- Length: 58:50
- Label: Edsel/Manifesto
- Producer: Bill Inglot

Tim Buckley chronology
| Live at the Troubadour 1969 (1994) | Honeyman: Live 1973 (1995) | Thin Wires In The Voice (1999) |

Professional ratings
Review scores
| Source | Rating |
|---|---|
| Allmusic | link |
| New Musical Express | 8/10 |

Honeyman: Live 1973 is a live album by rock artist Tim Buckley. The album was recorded as a live radio broadcast for radio station WLIR in New York City, United States on November 27, 1973.

The concert features songs from Buckley's seventh studio album Greetings from L.A. and his 1973 studio album Sefronia. Also featured are the songs Pleasant Street from Goodbye and Hello and Buzzin' Fly from the album Happy Sad. This live album is an example of his transformation from a late 60's folk rock poster boy to a sexualized funk and soul musician.

Rolling Stone called the live performance "outstanding".

== Track listing ==
All songs by Tim Buckley unless stated otherwise (** by Tim Buckley and Larry Beckett)

1. "Dolphins" (Fred Neil)
2. "Buzzin' Fly"
3. "Get On Top" **
4. "Devil Eyes" **
5. "Pleasant Street"
6. "Sally Go 'Round the Roses" (The Jaynetts)
7. "Stone In Love"
8. "Honey Man" **
9. "Sweet Surrender" **

== Personnel ==
- Tim Buckley – vocals, 12-string electric guitar
- Joe Falsia – lead guitar
- Bernie Mysior – bass
- Buddy Helm – drums
- Mark Tiernan – keyboards
