= Copenhagen Tapes =

Live album by Tim Buckley
- Released: October 21, 2000
- Recorded: Copenhagen, Denmark, October 12, 1968
- Genre: Folk
- Length: 49:41
- Label: Pinacle Licensed Repertoire

Tim Buckley chronology
Works in Progress (1999)	Copenhagen Tapes (2000)	Live at the Folklore Center 1967 (2009)

Professional ratings
Review scores
Source	Rating
Allmusic	4/5 stars

Copenhagen Tapes is a live album by Tim Buckley. It was recorded in Copenhagen, Denmark on October 12, 1968 and was broadcast later on Danish radio. The live performance features songs from Happy Sad, however "I Don't Need It to Rain" was only recorded in concert (see Live at the Troubadour 1969 for the other circulating take) and no studio version is believed to exist.

== Track listing ==
All songs by Tim Buckley

1. "I Don't Need It to Rain" – 21:37
2. "Buzzin' Fly" – 6:28
3. "Strange Feelin'" – 8:59
4. "Gypsy Woman" – 12:37

== Personnel ==
- Tim Buckley – Guitar, Vocals
- Lee Underwood – Guitar
- Niels-Henning Ørsted Pedersen – Double bass
- David Friedman – Vibes
