= Live at the Folklore Center 1967 =

Live at the Folklore Center, NYC, 1967

Live album by Tim Buckley
- Released: 2009
- Recorded: March 6, 1967
- Genre: Contemporary folk, psychedelic folk
- Length: 55:13
- Label: Tompkins Square
- Producer: Josh Rosenthal

Tim Buckley chronology
Copenhagen Tapes (Tim Buckley album) (1994)	Live at the Folklore Center, NYC, 1967 (2009)	Morning Glory: The Tim Buckley Anthology (2001)

Professional ratings
Review scores
Source	Rating
AllMusic	3.5/5 stars
Pitchfork	7.4/10
Tiny Mix Tapes	4/5 stars

Live at the Folklore Center NYC 1967 is a live album by Tim Buckley. The album was recorded at the Folklore Center in New York City, March 6, 1967.

== Track listing ==
1. "Song for Jainie (Buckley) – 3:02
2. "I Never Asked to Be Your Mountain" (Buckley) – 4:17
3. "Wings" (Buckley) – 2:44
4. "Phantasmagoria in Two" (Buckley) – 3:18
5. "Just Please Leave Me" (Buckley) – 2:28
6. "Dolphins" (Fred Neil) – 4:32
7. "I Can't See You" (Buckley, Larry Beckett) – 4:05
8. "Troubadour" (Buckley) – 4:30
9. "Aren't You the Girl" (Buckley) – 2:57
10. "What Do You Do (He Never Saw You)" (Buckley) – 2:51
11. "No Man Can Find the War" (Buckley, Larry Beckett) – 3:19
12. "Carnival Song" (Buckley) – 2:43
13. "Cripples Cry" (Buckley) – 5:07
14. "If the Rain Comes" (Buckley) – 2:50
15. "Country Boy" (Buckley) – 4:04
16. "I Can't Leave You Loving Me" (Buckley) – 2:26

== Personnel ==
- Tim Buckley – Guitar, Vocals
