= Lorca (album) =

Studio album by Tim Buckley
- Released: June 1970
- Recorded: 18, 19 & 26 September 1969
- Studio: Whitney Studios, Glendale, CA
- Genre: Avant-folk; experimental
- Length: 39:24
- Label: Elektra
- Producer: Dick Kunc

Tim Buckley chronology
Blue Afternoon (1969)	Lorca (1970)	Starsailor (1970)

Professional ratings
Review scores
Source	Rating
AllMusic	3/5 stars
DownBeat	3.5/5 stars

Lorca is the fifth studio album by singer-songwriter Tim Buckley, released in 1970 on Elektra Records. It was named after Spanish poet Federico Garcia Lorca, and was recorded simultaneously with Blue Afternoon (1969), though notably different in style. Its avant-garde approach breaks away from traditional songwriting styles, such as the verse/chorus binary form.

== Production ==
Lorca is a move away from traditional pop music forms towards a free-form mix of jazz, avant-garde and folk. Musically, Buckley uses the lack of a constant rhythm section to drive the songs forward with his voice. Many songs make use of a chromatic scale which makes them stand in stark contrast to Buckley's earlier melodic works. The lyrics of Lorca also represent a departure from his previous traditional pop-music writing, instead Buckley uses a more abstract descriptive style, avoiding direct narratives and standard song themes. This is a reflection of the poetry, such as the works of poet Federico García Lorca, that Buckley and guitarist Lee Underwood were reading at the time. The album's opener and title track is a much less guitar-based song, something in contrast to Buckley's previous works, and this would be a theme Buckley would explore further in his later avant-garde works.

According to Larry Beckett, his songwriting partner from Tim Buckley and Goodbye and Hello, he was purposely trying to alienate fans at this point. Buckley described it as an album that, "To this day, you can't put...on at a party without stopping things; it doesn't fit in."

Buckley describes the second track as a "real advance," and that "It deals with a ballad in a totally personal, physical presentation... It has to be done slowly; it has to take five or six minutes; it has to be a movement. It has to hold you there and make you aware that someone is telling you something about himself in the dark."

The album was written during a very prolific time for Buckley as he recorded and released four albums within a space of less than two years. Two of the albums, Blue Afternoon and Lorca were recorded in the space of a single month. Buckley completed these albums around the same time as an obligation to Warner Bros. Records, and also separately, Elektra Records owner Jac Holzman. Holzman, responsible for signing the artist, was in the process of selling the company and Buckley wanted to fulfil his contract in the time before Holzman's departure.

== Track listing ==
All tracks written by Tim Buckley.

Side One

1. "Lorca" – 9:53
2. "Anonymous Proposition" – 7:43

Side Two

1. "I Had a Talk with My Woman" – 6:01
2. "Driftin'" – 8:12
3. "Nobody Walkin'" – 7:35

== Personnel ==
- Tim Buckley – 12-string acoustic guitar, vocals
- Lee Underwood – electric guitar, electric piano
- John Balkin – upright bass, Fender bass, pipe organ
- Carter C.C. Collins – congas

Technical

- Herb Cohen – executive producer
- Dick Kunc – producer, engineer
- Ed Caraeff – photography
- Robert L. Heimall – design
- William S. Harvey – art direction
