= Starsailor =

Starsailor may refer to:

- Starsailor (band), an indie rock band from Chorley, England
- Starsailor (album), a 1970 album by Tim Buckley
