= Works in Progress (Tim Buckley album) =

Compilation album by Tim Buckley
- Released: September 1999
- Recorded: May 22, 1967 – July 14, 1968
- Genre: Folk Rock, Experimental Rock
- Length: 66:25
- Label: Rhino Handmade
- Producer: Jac Holzman, Zal Yanovsky, Jerry Yester, Roland Worthington

Tim Buckley chronology
Once I Was (1999)	Works in Progress (1999)	Copenhagen Tapes (2000)

Professional ratings
Review scores
Source	Rating
Allmusic	3/5 stars

Works in Progress is a compilation album by Tim Buckley. The album is a collection of studio recordings dating from early and mid-1968 in addition to one recording dating from a recording session in 1967. The material on this album consists of songs Buckley was working on for a third album, the at the time unnamed album that would become Happy Sad. The majority of the songs from the studio recording sessions were lost or erased but some songs were preserved on a compilation reel at the studio. The large part of these recordings were not used on Happy Sad and appear only on this compilation. Some of the songs here evolved into another song: "Danang" and "Ashbury Park" later came to form two movements of the three-part song "Love From Room 108 At The Islander (On Pacific Coast Highway)" that would appear on the final version of Buckley's third album.

The compilation also comes with a 20-page booklet complete with lyrics and liner notes by Buckley's lead guitarist, Lee Underwood. The original 1999 CD release consisted of a sole batch of 7,500 copies. A larger commercial release was made in 2001.

== Track listing ==
All tracks composed by Tim Buckley; except where noted.

1. "Danang" (Take 7 + 8 Intercut) – 6:30
2. "Sing a Song for You" (Take 11) – 5:43
3. "Buzzin' Fly" (Take 3) – 6:44
4. "Song to the Siren" (Take 7) (Larry Beckett, Buckley) – 3:28
5. "Happy Time" (Take 14) – 3:13
6. "Sing a Song for You" (Take 8) – 2:40
7. "Chase the Blues Away" (Take 3) – 4:00
8. "Hi Lily, Hi Lo" (Take 7) (Helen Deutsch, Bronisław Kaper) – 3:37
9. "Buzzin' Fly" (Take 9) – 5:07
10. "Wayfaring Stranger" (Take 4) (Traditional) – 4:24
11. "Ashbury Park Version 1" (Take 8) – 2:47
12. "Ashbury Park Version 2" (Take 14) – 3:21
13. "Ashbury Park Version 2" (Take 25 Labeled "Master") – 3:28
14. "Dream Letter" (Takes 17-16 Intercut) – 5:13
15. "The Father Song" (Take 3) – 2:44
16. "The Fiddler" (Rough Mix) – 3:26

== Personnel ==
- Tim Buckley – vocals, 12-string guitar
- Lee Underwood – guitar
- Carter Collins – congas, bells
- Jim Fielder, John David Miller – bass
- Eddie Hoh – drums
- Don Randi – piano
- Jerry Yester – piano
