= Rose Betts =

English singer-songwriter

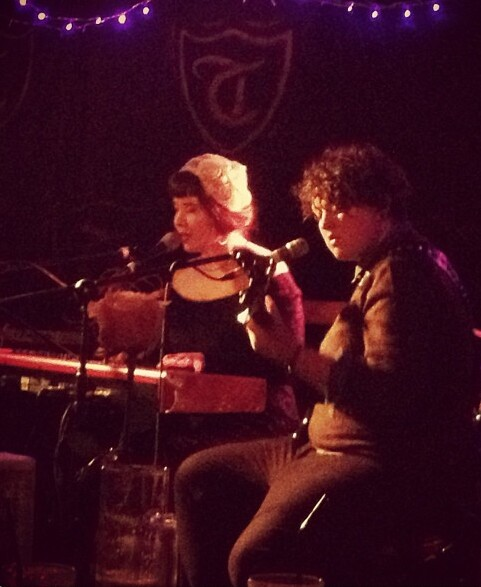
- Rose Betts playing in London in 2013

Background information
- Born: 17 October; Chipperfield, England
- Genres: Folk, Pop
- Occupation: Singer-songwriter
- Instruments: Vocals, piano, guitar
- Years active: 2011–present
- Label: Nettwerk
- Website: www.rosebetts.com

Rose Betts is an English singer-songwriter. She came to attention with viral TikTok hits "Driving Myself Home" in 2022, and "Irish Eyes" in 2023. In 2021, she produced and performed a cover of Tim Buckley's "Song to the Siren", on the soundtrack to Zack Snyder's Justice League, and collaborated with Bazzi on "Young & Alive", which was nominated for a Grammy award.

== Career ==
Betts was born in Chipperfield, Hertfordshire, and grew up there along with a twin sister and two younger siblings. After finishing school, Betts moved to London to start a career as a musician. She featured as lead vocals with Macedonian band Foltin on a track on the album Penelope X by Nikola Kodjabashia in 2011, and began to release her own music in 2016. Her music has been described as 'Celtic pop-fusion'. Betts' debut single "Orange Trees" was released in 2016, followed by an EP The Stars Look Down in 2017.

In 2020, she collaborated on Bazzi's single "Young and Alive", which received a nomination for Best Remixed Recording at the 63rd Annual Grammy Awards. That same year, Betts worked on a cover of "Song to the Siren", a song which had been written by Tim Buckley in 1967, and covered, among others, by This Mortal Coil in 1983. Betts' demo cover was selected by Zack Snyder for the soundtrack to the Snyder Cut, the 2021 director's cut of the DC extended universe superhero film Justice League. Among the critical acclaim for Betts' singing, Jeremy Urquhart at Collider commented in 2023 that it worked "fantastically" and was "one of the best and most memorable in all four hours of Zack Snyder's Justice League" soundtrack. Betts' version of "Song to the Siren" reached a rank of 82nd in the UK Official Singles Sales charts on 1 April 2021.

In December 2021, Betts was interviewed on a BBC Radio 4 episode of Soul Music, exploring the associations of "Song to the Siren" with the feelings of longing, love, and loss that it evokes. Betts explains how she immersed herself in the song, and in the words of the Larry Beckett poem on which it was based, to capture these emotions.

She released her debut album, White Orchids, in 2022. A track from this album "Driving Myself Home" went viral on TikTok. Betts recounts how she wrote the song as a joke, after a blind date, and within a day of uploading it to TikTok, it had 300,000 views. Her 2023 release "Irish Eyes" has garnered over 5 million views on TikTok, and 13 million listens on Spotify. "Driving Myself Home" was featured on Tom Robinson's 'BBC Introducing' show on BBC Radio 6 in February 2022.

In February 2024, Betts announced that she had signed to Nettwerk Music Group, with the release of her single "War". Later that year, Betts worked with Junkie XL (a.k.a. Tom Holkenborg) on several pieces on the soundtrack to Rebel Moon – Part Two: The Scargiver, which was released in April 2024. In September 2024, she released "Doodles", described as a 'buoyant Pub anthem'. Betts embarked on a debut tour in the US in September and October 2024, performing at 11 venues.

In March 2025, Betts released her second album, There Is No Ship, described by a reviewer as an 'emotional trip through memory, loss and legacy', along with a new single, "Six". In October 2025, Betts released a cover of David Bowie's Starman as a single, and later performed on a mini-tour of the United Kingdom and Ireland, with a solo show in London, and as the supporting act for Scottish folk band Tide Lines.

== Discography ==
Works are variously listed on Betts' verified listing on Spotify and other sources cited inline.

=== EP and albums ===
- The Stars Look Down (2016), EP
- White Orchids (2022)
- There Is No Ship (2025)

=== Singles ===
- "Orange Trees" (2016)
- "Changing Days" (2017)
- "Because it's Christmas" (2018)
- "Rocket" (2020)
- "Recovery" (2021)
- "Driving Myself Home" (2021)
- "Alone in an Uber" (2022)
- "Irish Eyes" (2023)
- "Delicate Dark" (2023)
- "Sober" (2023)
- "War" (2024)
- "Take This Body Home" (2024)
- "Come Away" (2024)
- "Doodles" (2024)
- "Running" (2024)
- "Six" (2025)
- "You Never Looked Back" (2025)
- "Hot Girl Summer" (2025)
- "Guy Friends" (2025)
- "Starman" (2025)

=== Collaborations ===
- "Dawn Of The Rose Red Fingers" (2011), lead vocals, from the album Penelope X (7 Songs & Postludium From The Musical "Odysseys And His Women") by Nikola Kodjbashia, Lithium.
- "Young & Alive" (2020), written by Betts, Kevin White and Bazzi, performed by Bazzi, remixed by Haywyre.
- "Song to the Siren" (2021) from Zack Snyder's Justice League: Original Motion Picture Soundtrack, produced and performed by Betts.
- "The Land we Breathe" (2024) from Rebel Moon – Part Two: The Scargiver soundtrack, composed by Junkie XL, featuring Rose Betts.
- "Northern Sky (With Rose Betts)", The Wellermen and Rose Betts (October 2025).
