= Erick Simpson =

American managed service author

- Citizenship: American
- Education: California State University, Fullerton
- Occupation: Author
- Writing career
- Language: English
- Website: www.ericksimpson.com

Erick Simpson is an American author who writes about the managed service provider field.

== Early life and education ==
Born in California, United States, Simpson was educated at the Loara High School. For his further education, he attended California State University, Fullerton and received a degree in business administration.

== Career ==
After his graduation, he worked at Dreyer's in personnel department. Later, he founded a trucking company which he owned until 1991.

Simpson is the co-founder of SPC International, a company which sells training in IT business improvement.

Simpson created the MSP Mastered Methodology to enhance the productivity of managed service providers and co-founded one of the first pure play MSPs.

== Awards and recognition ==
- SMB Nation's SMB Award
- Time ChannelPro 20/20 Visionaries
- Time MSP Mentor

== Bibliography ==
- The Guide to a Successful Managed Services Practice (2006)
