= Look at the Fool =

Studio album by Tim Buckley
- Released: September 13, 1974
- Studios: Wally Heider, Los Angeles; Record Plant, Los Angeles
- Genres: Rock; soul
- Length: 33:56
- Label: DiscReet
- Producer: Joe Falsia

Tim Buckley chronology
Sefronia (1973)	Look at the Fool (1974)

Look at the Fool is the ninth and final studio album by American singer-songwriter Tim Buckley, released on September 13, 1974, by DiscReet Records.

Look at the Fool received mixed reviews. AllMusic's Richie Unterberger gave the album one-and-a-half stars out of five, calling it "a sad, burned-out affair" and interpreting Buckley's "distressingly thin" vocals as evidence of vocal deterioration. OOR Magazine was more positive, calling it "the best Buckley album in many years."

In his liner notes for Morning Glory: The Tim Buckley Anthology, Barry Alfonso criticized the performances' exaggerated vocal mannerisms and perceived emotional emptiness, while acknowledging Buckley's continued technical command on the title track and "Who Could Deny You". Reviewing the remastered reissue, Record Collector described Joe Falsia's original production as having "somewhat contained" Buckley's vocal abilities. The magazine praised the reissue as "lusciously remastered" and argued that the album deserved reappraisal.

Although Look at the Fool became Buckley's final studio album, further projects were being planned before his death in June 1975. These included a song cycle with his frequent collaborator, poet Larry Beckett, based on Joseph Conrad's An Outcast of the Islands. A proposed live album would also have revisited material from different stages of his career.

Professional ratings
Review scores
Source	Rating
Allmusic	1.5/5 stars
OOR Magazine	(positive) link
Rolling Stone	(negative) link

== Track listing ==
All tracks are written by Tim Buckley, except where noted.

Side one
No.	Title	Length
1.	"Look at the Fool"	5:10
2.	"Bring It on Up"	3:26
3.	"Helpless"	3:18
4.	"Freeway Blues" (Tim Buckley, Larry Beckett)	3:10
5.	"Tijuana Moon" (Buckley, Beckett)	2:38
Total length:		17:42

Side two
No.	Title	Length
1.	"Ain't It Peculiar"	3:34
2.	"Who Could Deny You"	4:20
3.	"Mexicali Voodoo"	2:23
4.	"Down in the Street"	3:20
5.	"Wanda Lu"	2:37
Total length:		16:14 33:56

== Personnel ==
- Tim Buckley – guitar, vocals
- Venetta Fields, Clydie King, Sherlie Matthews – backing vocals
- Joe Falsia – guitar, bass guitar, arranger, producer
- Jim Fielder, Jim Hughart, Chuck Rainey – bass guitar
- Jesse Ehrlich – cello
- David Bluefield – clavinet on "Freeway Blues"
- Mike Melvoin – organ, piano, Moog synthesizer
- Mark Tiernan – electric piano
- Terry Harrington – horn, saxophone
- Richard Nash, William Peterson, John Rotella, Anthony Terran – horn
- King Errisson – congas
- Gary Coleman – percussion
- Earl Palmer – drums

Technical

- Stan Agol – recording and mixdown engineer
- Wally Heider – mixing
- Cal Schenkel – art direction
- Napoleon – cover illustration
