= Happy Sad (album) =

Studio album by Tim Buckley
- Released: April 1969
- Recorded: December 1968
- Studio: Elektra, Los Angeles, California
- Genre: Psychedelic folk; jazz fusion; folk jazz
- Length: 44:43
- Label: Elektra
- Producer: Zal Yanovsky, Jerry Yester

Tim Buckley chronology
Goodbye and Hello (1967)	Happy Sad (1969)	Blue Afternoon (1969)

Happy Sad is the third album by American singer-songwriter Tim Buckley, released in April 1969. It was recorded at Elektra Sound Recorders in Los Angeles, California and was produced by former Lovin' Spoonful members Zal Yanovsky and, coincidentally, his subsequent replacement Jerry Yester. It marked the beginning of Buckley's experimental period, as it incorporated elements of jazz that he had never used before. Many of the songs here represent a departure from the binary form that dominated much of his previous work.

== Composition ==
The sound of the album is characterized by David Friedman's vibraphone, an instrument which gives the album a more relaxed tone than Buckley's earlier work. The songs are much longer than on previous releases and this style continued through to later works. The vocals on the album are more stylized than earlier performances and this represents the beginning of Buckley using his voice like an instrument. The lyrics on Happy Sad represent a change as Buckley stopped working with Larry Beckett, his lyricist on the two previous albums Tim Buckley and Goodbye and Hello, and began writing the lyrics himself. Buckley's self-penned efforts stand in contrast to Beckett's occasionally political and literary-style work. Buckley would also go on to author all his own material on the following two albums.

== Inspirations and song analysis ==
Happy Sad shares much in common with his later albums, Lorca and Blue Afternoon. Much of the material that would appear on those albums was written at the same time as the songs that appear on this album, representing the most productive and prolific period of Buckley's career. Buckley's musical tastes expanded during the period that the album was written.

The first track, "Strange Feelin", was instrumentally inspired by Miles Davis' "All Blues" from Kind of Blue, while the melody of the song is totally original.

"Buzzin' Fly" was written much earlier than the rest of the work and was originally performed with a group Buckley had during high school, the Harlequin 3, with bassist Jim Fielder and later lyricist, Larry Beckett.

The third track, "Love from Room 109 at the Islander (On Pacific Coast Highway)", is a song composed of various movements and this represents the second time Buckley wrote in this manner, his previous effort being the title track of Goodbye and Hello. The segments of the song were written separately as "Danang" and "Ashbury Park", as demonstrated on the later released demo sessions, The Dream Belongs to Me: Rare and Unreleased 1968 - 1973. The final version of the song is backed by an 'ocean' sound effect, however this was not originally intended to feature on the song. Buckley and the band were happy with the take of song but because of a recording problem the track had a slight electric buzzing in the background. The producer solved this by muffling the buzzing with the ocean overdub.

"Dream Letter" is an ode and apology to his ex-wife, Mary Guibert, and his son Jeff Buckley. This is the second song Buckley wrote about the pair, the first being "I Never Asked to Be Your Mountain" on his previous LP, Goodbye and Hello. In comparison to that song "Dream Letter" has a more apologetic tone, the lyrics reveal this with Buckley lamenting "Does he ever ask about me?". It would be over five years later that Buckley would meet with his son again. The name of the song would later be used for a live album, the posthumous release Dream Letter: Live in London 1968. The concert features much of the same personnel from the Happy Sad sessions.

"Gypsy Woman" is a long track highlighting Buckley's vocal acrobatics and on the record has some qualities of a jam session. Buckley and his band were disappointed with its recording but the song would remain as part of Buckley's live repertoire for the following years.

The closer of the album, "Sing a Song For You", is more similar to Buckley's work on Goodbye and Hello than to the songs on the rest of the album. It shares the verse/chorus style and folk leanings of "Song to the Siren", which though released on Starsailor, was written around the same period.

== Chart performance ==
The album debuted on Billboard magazine's Top LP's chart in the issue dated April 19, 1969, peaking at No. 81 during a twelve-week run on the chart.

== Reception ==
Professional ratings
Review scores
Source	Rating
AllMusic	4.5/5 stars
Encyclopedia of Popular Music	4/5 stars

Released at the height of his popularity, Happy Sad was his highest charting album, but Buckley's experimentation on this album would alienate some of the fanbase and his mainstream appeal he gained with Goodbye and Hello. However, this was only the beginning of Buckley's experimentation with sound and genre, and subsequent releases would further reduce his mainstream popularity and see his sales take a downturn.

In 2000 it was voted number 954 in Colin Larkin's All Time Top 1000 Albums.

== Track listing ==
All tracks written by Tim Buckley.

Side One

1. "Strange Feelin'" – 7:40
2. "Buzzin' Fly" – 6:04
3. "Love from Room 109 at the Islander (On Pacific Coast Highway)" – 10:49

Side Two

1. "Dream Letter" – 5:12
2. "Gypsy Woman" – 12:19
3. "Sing a Song for You" – 2:39

== Personnel ==
- Tim Buckley – vocals, 12-string guitar
- Lee Underwood – lead guitar, keyboards
- John Miller – double bass
- Carter C.C. Collins – congas, conductor
- David Friedman – percussion, marimba, vibraphone

Technical

- Zal Yanovsky – producer
- Jerry Yester – producer
- Jac Holzman – production supervisor
- Bruce Botnick – engineer
- Ed Caraeff – photography
- William S. Harvey – art direction
- Robert L. Heimall – design

== Charts ==
Chart (1969)	Peak position
US Billboard Top LPs	81
