= Tim Buckley: My Fleeting House =

Video by Tim Buckley
- Released: May 15, 2007
- Recorded: 1967–1974
- Genre: Folk rock, funk, soul
- Length: 105:00
- Label: MVD Visual

Tim Buckley chronology
| The Best of Tim Buckley: 2006 Rerelease (2006) | Tim Buckley: My Fleeting House (2007) |

Professional ratings
Review scores
| Source | Rating |
|---|---|
| Allmusic | link |
| Honest Tune | Positive link |

Tim Buckley: My Fleeting House is a DVD-Video collection of live appearances and performances by Tim Buckley. It features footage from throughout his career, starting from a 1967 performance of "Song to the Siren" on The Monkees TV show and ending with a performance from May 21, 1974 of "Dolphins" (written by fellow 1960s folk musician Fred Neil) for The Old Grey Whistle Test. Broadcasts from WITF-TV's The Show from 1970 has performances of "I Woke Up" and "Come Here Woman". The DVD also contains recorded interviews with occasional songwriting partner Larry Beckett, regular lead guitarist Lee Underwood and David Browne, author of Dream Brother: The Lives and Music of Jeff and Tim Buckley, a dual biography of Tim Buckley and his son Jeff Buckley. The release also contains a 12-page photo booklet with liner notes.

== Track listing ==
All Songs by Tim Buckley except where indicated: ( * by Larry Beckett/Tim Buckley)

1. "No Man Can Find the War"* performed at Inside Pop
2. "Happy Time" performed at Late Night Line Up
3. "Morning Glory"* performed at Late Night Line Up
4. "Dolphins" (Fred Neil) performed at Old Grey Whistle Test
5. "Song to the Siren"* performed at The Monkees Show
6. "Who Do You Love" performed at Greenwich Village
7. "Happy Time" performed on Dutch TV
8. "Sing a Song for You" performed on Dutch TV
9. "Sally Go Round the Roses" (The Jaynetts) performed at Music Video Live
10. "Blue Melody" performed at Boboquivari
11. "Venice Beach (Music Boats by the Bay)" performed at Boboquivari
12. "I Woke Up"* performed at WITF-TV's The Show
13. "Come Here Woman" performed at WITF-TV's The Show
14. "Pleasant Street" performed in the film The Christian Licorice Store
