= Blue Melody: Tim Buckley Remembered =

- Author: Lee Underwood; John Goldsby
- Language: English
- Genre: Biography
- Publisher: Backbeat Books
- Publication date: October 1, 2002
- Publication place: United States
- Media type: Print Paperback
- ISBN: 0-87930-718-8 (2002 edition)
- OCLC: 49603042

Blue Melody: Tim Buckley Remembered is a biography of late 1960s and 1970s American musician and songwriter, Tim Buckley, written by his former lead guitarist and friend Lee Underwood. The book is an overview of the life and times of Tim Buckley and his group, documenting live performances and studio sessions.
