= Changes (1969 film) =

American drama film directed by Hall Bartlett

- Theatrical poster
- Directed by: Hall Bartlett
- Written by: Hall Bartlett; Tracy Butler; Bill E. Kelly
- Produced by: Hall Bartlett
- Starring: Kent Lane; Michele Carey; Jack Albertson
- Cinematography: Richard Moore
- Edited by: Peter Zinner
- Music by: Marty Paich; William Stevenson
- Production company: Hall Bartlett Productions, Inc.
- Distributed by: Cinerama Releasing Corporation
- Release date: February 11, 1969
- Running time: 93 minutes
- Country: United States
- Language: English

Changes is a 1969 American drama film directed and produced by Hall Bartlett. It follows Kent (Kent Lane) as he navigates his quest to search for meaning and find himself.

== Plot ==
Set in the 1960s, the film follows the lead character Kent, as he travels along the California coast. As he drifts, he recalls his former troubled girlfriend, Bobbi, who committed suicide after he broke off their relationship. During his travels he meets up with different women. However, he moves along rather than stay put in hopes of finding a meaning to his life.

== Cast ==
- Kent Lane as Kent
- Michele Carey as Julie
- Marcia Strassman as Kristine, reporter
- Jack Albertson as Kent's father
- Manuela Thiess as Bobbi
- Bill Kelly as Sammy
- Tom Holland as roommate
- Kenneth Washington as black motorist
- Alice Jubert as Kent's mother
- Emory Parnell as man seated at lunch counter
- Teri Garr as the waitress
- Kim Weston as singer in bar
- Gregory Walcott as businessman / job interviewer
- Sam Chew Jr. as Charlie
- Norman Alden as jumprope man
- Monica Peterson as protest girl

== Soundtrack ==
The film includes seven songs from the Tim Buckley album Goodbye and Hello on its soundtrack (such as, most prominently, "She Is"). In addition, it also contains Mike Condello's cover of Buffalo Springfield's "Expecting to Fly" and the Judy Collins cover of Joni Mitchell's classic, "Both Sides, Now". The title song "Changes" was written by former Motown executive William "Mickey" Stevenson, Vicki Basemore, and Stevenson's wife, fellow Motown alumnus Kim Weston. Weston performs the song in the film and on the soundtrack album.

== Reception ==
In The New York Times, critic Howard Thompson said, "If Changes had a culminating dramatic effect equal to its perception and visual beauty, the picture [...] would be a masterpiece. Even so, it is one of the most imaginative, haunting and artistic movies yet made of contemporary youth at bay. It is a remarkable film and — more than that — a remarkable experience." Meanwhile, John Simon described Changes as "an abomination" in his film review encyclopedia, Movies into Film.
