= Live at the Troubadour 1969 =

Live album by Tim Buckley
- Released: March 22, 1994
- Recorded: September 3 & 4, 1969
- Genre: Experimental rock
- Length: 78:13
- Label: Rhino; Manifesto
- Producer: Herb Cohen

Tim Buckley chronology
Morning Glory (1994)	Live at the Troubadour 1969 (1994)	Honeyman: Live 1973 (1995)

Professional ratings
Review scores
Source	Rating
AllMusic	3/5 stars
New Musical Express	6/10

Live at the Troubadour 1969 is a live album by Tim Buckley. The album was recorded at the Troubadour in Los Angeles, September 3 & 4, 1969.

== Track listing ==
All songs composed by Tim Buckley.

1. "Strange Feelin'" – 5:40
2. "Venice Mating Call" – 3:27
3. "I Don't Need It to Rain" – 11:06
4. "I Had a Talk With My Woman" – 7:32
5. "Gypsy Woman" – 14:31
6. "Blue Melody" – 5:37
7. "Chase the Blues Away" – 6:19
8. "Driftin'" – 7:56
9. "Nobody Walkin'" – 16:05

== Personnel ==
- Tim Buckley – Acoustic 12 string Guitar, Vocals, Marimba
- Lee Underwood – Electric Guitar, Electric piano
- John Balkin – Bass
- Carter Collins – Congas, Cymbals
- Art Tripp – Drums, Marimba
