= Luca Ferrari (writer) =

Italian music writer

Luca Chino Ferrari (born April 6, 1963) is an Italian music writer and lyricist.

He has written books about folk and rock musicians such as Third Ear Band, Pink Floyd, Robyn Hitchcock, Captain Beefheart, Tim Buckley, Syd Barrett, and articles and reviews for Italian magazines such as Ciao 2001, Vinile, Buscadero, Mijuzik and Rockerilla. He met Syd Barrett in 1986, and contributed to the reunion of the Third Ear Band during the 1980s.

Having run Italian fanzines about Pink Floyd and Syd Barrett from 1979 to 1983, he worked together with Ivor Trueman (who was running the fanzines The Amazing Pudding and Opel) on a petition to release the album Opel. His book Tatuato sul Muro: L'enigma di Syd Barrett (Tattooed on the Wall: The Syd Barret Enygma), published in January 1986, was the first biography of Syd Barrett.

In 1993 he contributed an essay to the Captain Beefheeart (Don Van Vliet) exhibition catalogue Stand up to be Discontinued: The Art of Don Van Vliet (Hatje Cantz Verlag) and in 2011 he gave an expertise advice to a book titled Barrett (Essential Works Limited, London 2012), edited by Russell Beecher and Will Shutes.

His book about Italian folk music titled Folk Geneticamente Modificato (Genetically Modified Folk) (2003) is one of the few books on the subject ever published in Italy. With the consent of the band's heirs and musicians, in 2009 he conceived Ghettoraga, the official archive of the Third Ear Band, of which he is the online editor at

In 2015 he published for Gonzo Multimedia Out of Nowhere, the first biography on English jazz piano player Mike Taylor. In the following years for Gonzo Multimedia and Cherry Red Records/Esoteric Recordings he edited booklets for CDs by Captain Beefheart and Third Ear Band, included the CD box titled Mosaics with all the remastered original E.M.I.-Harvest catalogue.

In 2020 November Books published his book Glen Sweeney's Book of Alchemies about the story of the Third Ear Band. In 2021 he formed with avant-garde musician and composer Francesco Paolo Paladino the band His Majesty The Baby, which in 2022 released its first album Hope For Madness (Silentes), with all the lyrics written by him.

In 2022 with Paladino and singer Dorothy Moskowitz (once of late-60s band The United States of America), he formed Dorothy Moskowitz & The United States Of Alchemy, which in early 2023 released the album Under An Endless Sky on California label Tompkins Square Records, with all the lyrics written by him.

After a book on Syd Barrett, a collection of writings written in forty years titled Scritto sui rovi (Written on the brambles, from a line of Barrett's lyrics) published in 2024, in 2025 Zona Editrice published a new book on Tim Buckley titled Incontro con il demone (Encounter with the demon), one of the few biographies existing about the American folker.

In August 2026, Recommended Records released his Shrink (W)Rap!, co-written with Henry Cow drummer Chris Cutler, a CD-book that tells the story of musical miniatures in popular music – those short tracks lasting less than a minute. An extended version of it, written in Italian and titled La rivoluzione della musica breve (The short music revolution), was published in October 2026 by Editrice Zona - an essay of about 400 pages with a deep investigation of the short songs, with their relation with other forms of communication as aphorisms, epigrams, poems, and haiku.

== Bibliography ==
- Pink Floyd (Arcana Editrice, Milano 1985)
- Tatuato sul Muro. L'enigma di Syd Barrett (Gammalibri, Milano 1986)
- Un'anima senza impronte. Nick Drake: la vita, le canzoni (Gammalibri, Milano 1987)
- Syd Barrett (Stampa Alternativa, Roma-Viterbo 1988)
- Pink Floyd. Enciclopedia A/Z (Arcana Editrice, Milano 1990)
- Tatuato sul Muro. L'enigma di Syd Barrett (Gammalibri, Milano 1990 - 2nd revisited edition)
- Tatuato sul Muro. L'enigma di Syd Barrett (Kaos Edizioni, Milano 1995 - 3rd revisited edition)
- Captain Beefheart. Pearls before swine, ice cream for crows (Stampa Alternativa, Roma-Viterbo 1996)
- Syd Barrett. A fish out of water (Stampa Alternativa, Roma-Viterbo 1996)
- Third Ear Band. Necromancers of the drifting West (Stampa Alternativa, Roma-Viterbo 1997)
- Tim Buckley. Thin wires in the voice (Stampa Alternativa, Roma-Viterbo 1999)
- Nick Drake. The sweet suggestions of the pink moon. Genealogy of a rock myth (Stampa Alternativa, Roma-Viterbo 1999)
- Robyn Hitchcock. A middle class hero (Stampa Alternativa, Roma-Viterbo 2000)
- Folk Geneticamente Modificato. Musiche e musicisti della moderna tradizione nell’Italia dei McDonald’s (Stampa Alternativa, Roma-Viterbo 2003)
- Out of Nowhere.The uniquely elusive jazz of Mike Taylor (Gonzo Multimedia, London 2015)
- Glen Sweeney's Book of Alchemies.The life and times of the Third Ear Band 1967-1973 (ReR November Books, Thornton Heath 2020)
- Syd Barrett. Scritto sui rovi (Editrice Zona, Genova 2024)
- Syd Barrett. Gemelli opposti con una fiducia infantile nell'altro e nel destino/Opposite Twins With A Childlike Trust In Each Other And Destiny (Editrice Zona, Genova 2025 - Italian/English e-book)
- Tim Buckley. Incontro con il demone (Editrice Zona, Genova 2025)
- Shrink (W)Rap! (ReR November Books, Thornton Heath 2026)
- La rivoluzione della musica breve. Storia delle miniature sonore (Editrice Zona, Genova 2026)

== Translations and curatorship ==
- Mike Watkinson-Pete Anderson, Syd Barrett. Il diamante pazzo dei Pink Floyd (Arcana Editrice, Milano 1990)
- Tom Robbins, Lo Scopo della Luna (Stampa Alternativa, Roma-Viterbo 1994)
- John Cavanagh, Pink Floyd. The Piper at the Gates of Dawn (Editrice Sublime Records & Books, Modena 2005 - second edition No Reply, Milano 2008)
- Steve Matteo, The Beatles. Let It Be (Editrice Sublime Records & Books, Modena 2005 - second edition No Reply, Milano 2008)
- Mike Watkinson-Pete Anderson, Syd Barrett. Il diamante pazzo dei Pink Floyd (Arcana Editrice, Roma 2005) 2nd revisited edition
- Mike Watkinson-Pete Anderson, Crazy Diamond. Il viaggio psichedelico di Syd Barrett (Arcana Editrice, Roma 2008) 3rd revisited edition
- John Perry, Jimi Hendrix. Electric Ladyland (Editrice Sublime Records & Books, Modena 2006 - second edition No Reply, Milano 2009)
- Mike Watkinson-Pete Anderson, Crazy Diamond. Il viaggio psichedelico di Syd Barrett (Arcana Editrice, Roma 2014) 4th revisited edition

== CD/LP/DVD booklets editing, writings, and expertize ==
- Massimiano Bucchi, A school guide to XTC (Book/CD - Stampa Alternativa, ITA 1999)
- AA.VV., The Vegetable man Project Vol. 2 (CD - OVNI Records, ITA 2003)
- AA.VV., The Vegetable Man Project (LP - OVNI Records, ITA 2004)
- Dario Antonetti, Il Rigore Esistenziale (CD - La Locomotiva, ITA 2012)
- Third Ear Band, Necromancers of the drifting West (CD - Gonzo Multimedia, UK 2015)
- Third Ear Band, New forecasts from the third ear almanac (CD - Gonzo Multimedia, UK 2015)
- Captain Beefheart, Pearls before swine ice cream for crows (CD - Gonzo Multimedia, UK 2016)
- Third Ear Band, Exorcisms (CD - Gonzo Multimedia, UK 2016)
- Maria Assunta Karini, Dreamsmellers (DVD - Silentes, ITA 2016)
- Third Ear Band, Brain Waves (CD - Gonzo Multimedia, UK 2017)
- Third Ear Band, Spirits (CD - Gonzo Multimedia, UK 2017)
- Third Ear Band, Third Ear Band (CD - Esoteric Recordings, UK 2018)
- Third Ear Band, Music from Macbeth (CD - Esoteric Recordings, UK 2019)
- Third Ear Band, Alchemy (CD - Esoteric Recordings, UK 2019)
- Francesco Paolo Paladino, De Musica et in fungorum effectis (CD Box - Silentes, ITA 2020)
- Unfolk, Alessandro Monti, The Diplodisc Years 2006-2014 - Diplobag (5CD Box set - Diplodisc special, ITA 2020)
- Various Artists, Love You. A tribute to Syd Barrett (2CDs - Gonzo Multimedia, UK 2021)
- Various Artists, Miniatures 2020 (2CDs - Recommended Records, UK 2021)
- Third Ear Band, Druid One (LP/CD - M.I.G. Music, GER 2024)
- William Hayter and the Small World Collective, Singing A Song In The Morning (An Affectionate Tribute to the Music of Kevin Ayers) (CD - The 82nd Gramophone Company, UK 2026)

== Novels, Short stories... ==
- Finale (Edizioni FUOCOFuochino, Viadana (MN) 2015)
- Shiva a Milano (Edizioni FUOCOFuochino, Viadana (MN) 2016)
- La Giornata Mondiale (Edizioni FUOCOFuochino, Viadana (MN) 2017)
- Domani, Armageddon (Casa Editrice Libera e Senza Impegni, Milano 2020)
- Dei delitti e delle pene altrui (Edizioni FUOCOFuochino, Viadana (MN) 2024)
- La Frisona Cosmica in AA.VV., Cartoline d'Italia (Giulio Perrone Editore, Roma 2025)

== CD/LP lyrics composition ==
- His Majesty The Baby, Hope For Madness (CD - Silentes, ITA 2022)
- Dorothy Moskowitz & The United States Of Alchemy, Under An Endless Sky (CD - Tompkins Square Records, USA 2023)
- Dorothy Moskowitz, Rising To Eternity (digital album/streaming - Tompkins Square Records, USA 2023) lyrics for "The Creation" and "Dimension"
- Francesco Paolo Paladino and Martyn Bates, Treasure Of Light (CD - Silentes, ITA 2024) lyrics for "The Same Airport"
- Enten Hitti, Mistiche Ribelli (CD - Lizard, ITA 2025) lyrics for "Our needs of consolation"
- Francesco Paolo Paladino and Dorothy Moskowitz, Monastir (CD - Silentes, ITA 2025) Intro & Outro, lyrics adaptation for the singing
- Five Miracle Tent Crusade, Snaporaz! (digital track on BandCamp, USA 2025) Lyrics, laughter and sonic punctuation
- Dorothy Moskowitz & The United States of Alchemy, Songs Of Compassion (CD - Silentes, ITA 2026)
- His Majesty The Baby, Dadayama (CD - Silentes, ITA 2026)
