= Morning Glory: The Tim Buckley Anthology =

Greatest hits album by Tim Buckley
- Released: 2001
- Recorded: 1966–1975
- Genre: Experimental rock
- Length: 77:13 (Disc 1); 73:20 (Disc 2)
- Label: Rhino
- Producers: James Austin, Bill Inglot

Tim Buckley chronology
Live at the Folklore Center 1967 (2009)	Morning Glory: The Tim Buckley Anthology (2001)	The Dream Belongs to Me: Rare and Unreleased 1968 - 1973 (2001)

Professional ratings
Review scores
Source	Rating
AllMusic	4/5 stars
entertainment.ie	4/5 stars
Entertainment Weekly	(A)
Los Angeles Times	3.5/4 stars
NME	(8/10)
Rolling Stone	3.5/5 stars
Encyclopedia of Popular Music	5/5 stars

Morning Glory: The Tim Buckley Anthology is a compilation album by Tim Buckley. The two cds give an overview of Tim Buckley's career. The compilation contains material from the many phases of Buckley's career, and includes a previously unreleased version of "Song to the Siren", as performed in 1968 on The Monkees. The photo used for the cover art was taken by Linda Eastman, more commonly known as Linda McCartney.

== Track listing ==
=== Disc one ===
1. "Wings" (Tim Buckley) – 2:33
2. "She Is" (Larry Beckett, Buckley) – 3:08
3. "Song Slowly Song" (Beckett, Buckley) – 4:16
4. "It Happens Every Time" (Buckley) – 1:51
5. "Aren't You the Girl" (Buckley) – 2:05
6. "Pleasant Street" (Buckley) – 5:17
7. "Hallucinations" (Beckett, Buckley) – 4:55
8. "No Man Can Find the War" (Beckett, Buckley) – 2:59
9. "Once I Was" (Buckley) – 3:23
10. "Morning Glory" (Beckett, Buckley) – 2:54
11. "Goodbye and Hello" (Beckett, Buckley) – 8:40
12. "Buzzin' Fly" (Buckley) – 6:04
13. "Strange Feelin'" (Buckley) – 7:40
14. "Sing a Song for You" (Buckley) – 2:41
15. "Phantasmagoria in Two" (Buckley) – 4:42 (live)
16. "I've Been Out Walking" (Buckley) – 8:20 (live)
17. "Troubadour" (Buckley) – 5:45 (live)

=== Disc two ===
1. "Happy Time" (Buckley) – 3:17
2. "Chase the Blues Away" (Buckley) – 5:13
3. "I Must Have Been Blind" (Buckley) – 3:45
4. "The River" (Buckley) – 5:48
5. "So Lonely" (Buckley) – 3:29
6. "Blue Melody" (Buckley) – 4:55
7. "I Had a Talk With My Woman" (Buckley) – 7:27 (live)
8. "Moulin Rouge" (Beckett, Buckley) – 1:58
9. "Song to the Siren" (Beckett, Buckley) – 3:29
10. "Monterey" (Beckett, Buckley) – 4:31
11. "Sweet Surrender" (Buckley) – 6:47
12. "Hong Kong Bar" (Buckley, Joe Falsia) – 7:07
13. "Make It Right" (Beckett, Buckley, Falsia, Jerry Goldstein) – 4:10
14. "Sally Go 'Round the Roses" (Buckley) – 3:46
15. "Who Could Deny You" (Buckley) – 4:23
16. "Song to the Siren" (Beckett, Buckley) – 3:15 (from The Monkees TV show)
