= Top Gear (radio programme) =

- Country of origin: United Kingdom
- Home station: BBC Light Programme; BBC Radio 1
- Hosted by: Brian Matthew; John Peel; Tommy Vance; Pete Drummond
- Produced by: Bernie Andrews; John Walters
- Original release: 16 July 1964 – 25 September 1975

Top Gear is a BBC Radio programme broadcast between 1964 and 1975. It was known for its specially recorded sessions in addition to playing records. Top Gear began life in 1964 on the BBC Light Programme and was revived with a progressive rock focus in 1967 on BBC Radio 1, running with that format until its end in 1975. After its demise, host John Peel kept the same format for his own show on Radio 1 until his death.

== Origin and format ==
Top Gear was one of the BBC's few attempts to compete with the pirate radio stations and Radio Luxembourg, who had attracted large audiences of young British pop music listeners in the absence of an "official" alternative. The programme comprised a mixture of records and live sessions, was introduced by Brian Matthew, and featured many guests such as Jimi Hendrix, Free, The Beatles, Cream, early Fleetwood Mac, The Who, Pink Floyd, Dusty Springfield, Led Zeppelin, Deep Purple, The Kinks and Manfred Mann.

The programme was first broadcast on 16 July 1964, produced by Bernie Andrews. The name, Top Gear, had been chosen after a national competition. The winning entry had been submitted by a young woman called Susan Warne, who attended the first recording and was interviewed on the programme. The guests on that first show included The Beatles, Mark Wynter and Dusty Springfield.

== Revival ==
It was revived, and evolved into a "progressive" music show, in the early years of BBC Radio 1 (from 1967 into the 1970s), with the same format of records and specially recorded sessions. It was hosted variously by Tommy Vance, Pete Drummond and, most notably, John Peel, who, with the help of sympathetic producers Bernie Andrews and John Walters, turned it into an award-winning show, while retaining the emphasis on new music. In 1971, the programme merged with the Sounds of the Seventies strand, broadcast on FM. It was still introduced by Peel, and moved from its weekend slot to two evenings a week.

== Demise ==
It ended when the BBC, facing a serious financial crisis, was forced to make cutbacks in the Radio One schedules; most of the evening programmes of "progressive music" were scrapped. The final Top Gear episode was broadcast on 25 September 1975; it was composed mostly of sessions by artists who had become famous after appearing on Top Gear, such as T. Rex, Pink Floyd, Led Zeppelin, Randy Newman, and Bob Marley & The Wailers. On this show, Peel spoke of how the programme had been in its heyday. He continued to host similar programmes of records and sessions for the BBC until his death in 2004.
