= Greetings from L.A. =

Studio album by Tim Buckley
- Released: August 1972
- Recorded: June 1972
- Studios: Far Out Studios, Hollywood, California
- Genres: Funk, R&B
- Length: 39:38
- Labels: Straight Records LP; Enigma Retro CD
- Producer: Jerry Goldstein

Tim Buckley chronology
| Starsailor (1970) | Greetings from L.A. (1972) | Sefronia (1973) |

Greetings from L.A. is the seventh album by singer-songwriter Tim Buckley, released in August 1972. It was recorded at Far Out Studios in Hollywood, California. Like most of his other albums, Greetings from L.A. did not sell well, although this is probably his best seller (there are at least 2 different US pressings: the first with removable postcard and dark green WB label, the second had no perforations for the postcard and had the Burbank WB label), getting substantial airplay in the Twin Cities on the Minneapolis FM station KQRS and selling very well at the independent record shops in Minneapolis-St. Paul and elsewhere (Detroit, New York, etc.) until it was deleted by Warner Brothers (whereupon Greetings continued to sell as a UK/European import into the 80s).

The album was later re-released on November 7, 2005, in a compilation with debut album.

Musically, the album is uncharacteristic of Buckley, and is regarded as a departure from the generally folk oriented style of Buckley's first two albums and away from the more experimental, jazz-tinged albums that followed, with the album being more inclined towards funk. Also notable are the sexually provocative lyrics, another departure for Buckley.

Professional ratings
Review scores
| Source | Rating |
|---|---|
| Allmusic | link |
| Christgau's Record Guide | B |
| FasterLouder | link |
| Encyclopedia of Popular Music | 4/5 stars |
| Jerk Music Critic | link |

== Track listing ==
All tracks by Tim Buckley, except where noted.

Side A
| No. | Title | Writer(s) | Length |
|---|---|---|---|
| 1. | "Move with Me" | Tim Buckley, Jerry Goldstein | 4:52 |
| 2. | "Get on Top" | | 6:33 |
| 3. | "Sweet Surrender" | | 6:47 |

Side B
| No. | Title | Writer(s) | Length |
|---|---|---|---|
| 4. | "Nighthawkin'" | | 3:21 |
| 5. | "Devil Eyes" | | 6:50 |
| 6. | "Hong Kong Bar" | Tim Buckley, Joe Falsia | 7:08 |
| 7. | "Make It Right" | Tim Buckley, Larry Beckett, Joe Falsia, Jerry Goldstein | 4:07 |

== Personnel ==
- Tim Buckley – 12-string guitar, vocals
- Venetta Fields, Clydie King, Lorna Willard – vocals
- Joe Falsia – guitar; string arrangements on "Sweet Surrender" and "Make It Right"
- Chuck Rainey – bass guitar
- Reinhold Press – bass guitar on "Make It Right"
- Harry Hyams, Ralph Schaeffer – viola
- Louis Kievman – violin
- Robert Konrad – violin, guitar
- William Kurasch – violin
- Jesse Ehrlich – cello on "Make It Right"
- Kevin Kelly – organ, piano
- Paul Ross Novros, Eugene E. Siegel – saxophone on "Move With Me"
- Jerry Goldstein – percussion, arranger, producer
- Carter C.C. Collins – congas
- King Errisson – congas
- Ed Greene – drums

Technical

- Chris Huston, Stan Agol – engineer
- Cal Schenkel – album design
- Bob Gordon – cover photography
