= Loara High School =

Public secondary school in California, United States

Location
- 1765 West Cerritos; Anaheim, California 92804; United States
- Coordinates: 33°48′42″N 117°56′39″W

Information
- Type: Public Secondary, International School
- Motto: "Once a Saxon, Always a Saxon"
- Established: 1962
- Principal: Gary Brown
- Staff: 76.52 (FTE)
- Grades: 9-12
- Enrollment: 1,565 (2023-2024)
- Student to teacher ratio: 20.45
- Campus: Urban
- Colors: Scarlet and gold
- Mascot: Saxon
- Newspaper: The Saxon Shield
- Yearbook: Seaxe
- Website: Loara High Website

Loara High School is a public four year American high school in the Anaheim Union High School District, located in the Southwest Anaheim region of Anaheim, California. Loara is a Title I school that serves many students from low-income families, and the campus consists of 1,783 students and 75 certificated staff. Loara is a California Distinguished School which prepares students to "innovate in service of their community". The school was one of the premier institutions becoming an International School under the International Baccalaureate in Orange County in 1999, however, the program was discontinued in 2009 due to the lack of funding.

== Students ==
In 1962, the student body consisted of the following percentage of ethnic groups: 90% Caucasian, >0.1% Native Americans, >0.5% Asian/Indian American, >0.1 Filipino American, 8% Hispanic, >0.1% African American. As of 2010, the campus' over 2,686 students consists of the following percentage of ethnic groups: 0.3% American Indian, 11% Asian, 1% Pacific Islander, 3% Filipino, 71% Hispanic, 1% Asian Indian, 2% African-American, and 12% Caucasian. Over half of the student qualify for the reduced lunch program. Nearly one fourth of the students participate in an English learners program.

== History ==
Loara was established in 1962, with the first graduating class in 1965, and is one of eight comprehensive high schools within the district.

In 1971, then-California governor and future U.S. President Ronald Reagan visited the Loara campus on a tour of the city of Anaheim.

The school has recently undergone modernization under Bond Measure Z, which includes two gyms, a science building, and a math building. In 2006, the campus completed an extensive technology improvement plan. This includes the construction of the prototype for "Classroom of the Future," two technologically advanced rooms that were designed to model future prospects.

Sammy Saxon is the school mascot. His appearance is typically depicted as a caricature of an Anglo-Saxon warrior.

== Academics ==
Loara had one of the largest International Baccalaureate (IB) programs in Orange County. The IB program is no longer offered at Loara. Loara was authorized to offer the IB Diploma Programme in July 1999, the program is taught in English to 148 students.

== Athletics ==
The school competes in the CIF-SS Garden Grove League.

State championships

- Tennis, 1966

== Notable faculty ==
- Lute Olson (Robert Luther Olson); Former high school, college and Olympic basketball coach.

== Notable alumni ==
- Mike Adams; Major League Baseball outfielder for the Minnesota Twins.
- Larry Beckett; poet and songwriter who collaborated with Tim Buckley and Jim Fielder.
- Jeff Buckley; alternative rock singer-songwriter and guitarist Son of Tim Buckley.
- Tim Buckley; folk singer-songwriter. Father of Jeff Buckley. Collaborated with Larry Beckett and Jim Fielder.
- Bob Caffrey; baseball player
- Sylvia Day; best-selling author.
- Linda Emond; actress
- Jim Fielder; bassist for Blood, Sweat & Tears. Collaborated with Larry Beckett and Tim Buckley.
- Bret Freeman; Europe's leading MMA Ring Announcer.
- Charles Gipson; Major League Baseball player
- Ahmed Hassanein; college football defensive end for the Boise State Broncos
- Lauren Lappin; member of the 2008 Summer Olympics Women's Softball Team Silver Medal winner. Her Olympic Number 37 was retired by Loara Softball on March 20, 2023
- Brian Mashburn; founding member of Save Ferris, wrote music & lyrics. Was in the movie Ten Things I Hate About You. Currently in Starpool, Powersurge, and Red Panda
- Kevin McLain; National Football League player
- Augie Nieto; founder of Lifefitness and inventor of the Lifecycle. Augie has recently become a spokesman for the Muscular Dystrophy Association and was featured on the cover of Parade Magazine.
- Dan Ripley American Pole Vaulter
- Dana Schoenfeld; 1972 Summer Olympics Silver Medal winner, Swimming.
- Eric Stefani; co-founder of No Doubt. An animator for the series, The Simpsons. Brother of Gwen.
- Gwen Stefani; co-founder and lead singer of the band No Doubt. Also an internationally renowned solo performer. Sister of Eric.
- Stacey Q (Stacey Lynn Swain); recording artist
- John Van Houten; Tuba player, teacher, and recording artist in the Los Angeles area
- Eric Zamora; founding member of Save Ferris, currently in Starpool
- George Zeber; Major League Baseball player
