= Sefronia =

Studio album by Tim Buckley
- Released: September 1973
- Recorded: 1973
- Studio: Paramount Recording Studios, Los Angeles; Record Plant, New York; Devonshire Sound Studios, North Hollywood
- Genre: Soul; folk
- Length: 37:55
- Label: DiscReet
- Producer: Denny Randell

Tim Buckley chronology
Greetings from L.A. (1972)	Sefronia (1973)	Look at the Fool (1974)

Professional ratings
Review scores
Source	Rating
AllMusic	2/5 stars
The Encyclopedia of Popular Music	2/5 stars
MusicHound Rock: The Essential Album Guide	2/5 stars
The Rolling Stone Album Guide	1/5 stars

Sefronia is the eighth album by singer-songwriter Tim Buckley, released in September 1973.

== Production ==
The album was produced by Denny Randell. It was recorded at Paramount Recording Studios in Los Angeles, California. Other tracks were recorded at Record Plant, in New York, and at Devonshire Sound Studios in North Hollywood.

== Critical reception ==
AllMusic wrote that Buckley's "voice isn't as stunning as usual on his next-to-last album, but the bigger problem is the material, which is usually forced and pedestrian." Trouser Press wrote: "Denny Randell’s anachronistic-on-impact LA white-soul production, which pours syrupy strings over several numbers, is hardest to digest on poorly chosen middle-of-the-road love songs that didn’t suit Buckley at all." NME declared that the album is "widely agreed to be Buckley’s most over-produced and underwhelming effort."

== Track listing ==
Side One

1. "Dolphins" (Fred Neil) – 3:10
2. "Honey Man" (Larry Beckett, Tim Buckley) – 4:10
3. "Because of You" (Beckett, Buckley) – 4:25
4. "Peanut Man" (Fred Freeman, Harry Nehls) – 2:52
5. "Martha" (Tom Waits) – 3:10

Side Two

1. "Quicksand" (Buckley) – 3:22
2. "I Know I'd Recognize Your Face" (Letty Jo Baron, Denny Randell) – 3:58
3. "Stone in Love" (Buckley) – 3:27
4. "Sefronia: After Asklepiades, After Kafka" (Beckett, Buckley) – 3:15
5. "Sefronia: The King's Chain" (Beckett, Buckley) – 2:23
6. "Sally, Go 'Round the Roses" (Lona Stevens, Zell Sanders) – 3:43

== Personnel ==
- Tim Buckley – guitar, vocals
- Lee Underwood – guitar
- Joe Falsia – guitar
- Bob Rafkin – guitar
- Marcia Waldorf, Sharon Beard, Myrna Matthews, Lisa Roberts – backing vocals
- Bernie Mysior – bass guitar
- Reinhold Press – bass guitar
- Mark Tiernan – keyboards
- Denny Randell – keyboards, producer, arrangements
- Tom Scott – tenor saxophone
- Fred Selden – flute
- Earl Dumler – English horn
- Larry Bunker – percussion
- King Errisson – percussion, congas, tambourine
- Ken Watson – percussion, timpani
- Buddy Helm – drums
- David Blumberg – string arrangements

Technical

- Greg Venable, Kerry McNabb, Larry Hirsch, Roger Dollarhide, Roy Cicala – engineers
- Cal Schenkel – art direction
- Ed Caraeff – cover photography
