= Once I Was (song) =

Single by Tim Buckley

from the album Goodbye and Hello
- Released: August 1967
- Recorded: Western Recorders & Whitney, Los Angeles
- Genre: Psychedelic folk
- Length: 3:22
- Label: Elektra
- Songwriter: Tim Buckley
- Producer: Jac Holzman

"Once I Was" is a 1967 song by singer-songwriter Tim Buckley. It is the sixth track from his album Goodbye and Hello and the first song on second side of the LP.The song prominently features harmonica played by folk musician and rock photographer Henry Diltz.

== Lyrics ==
The lyrics are an homage to Fred Neil’s 1967 song “The Dolphins” and reflects the point of view of someone who used to be the lover of an unknown subject, but continues to ponder if the subject ever reflects on the experience similarly.

== Other performances ==
Tim Buckley's son, Jeff, recorded a cover of this song for a tribute concert to Tim in 1991. According to Jeff Buckley, "Once I Was," was the first time he heard his father's voice.

The song has also been covered by Gregg Allman.

== Use in other media ==
The song was used during Bruce Dern's final sequence in the film Coming Home about Vietnam War veterans dealing with the conflict of trauma long after the war has ended. This song was also prominently used in the 1969 film Changes and in Greetings From Tim Buckley.
