= David Friedman (percussionist) =

American jazz percussionist

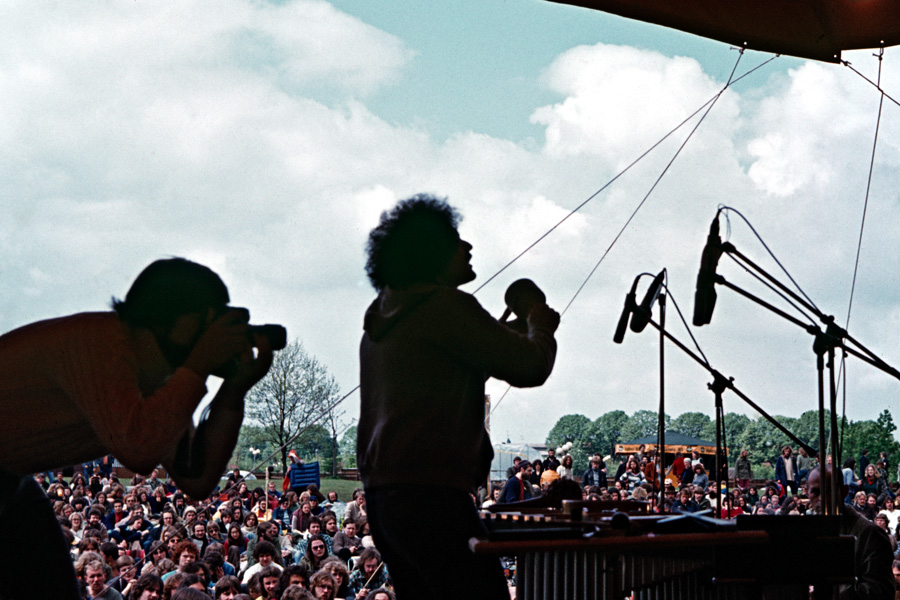
David Friedman at the Moers Festival in 1978

David Friedman (born March 10, 1944, New York City) is an American jazz percussionist. His primary instruments are vibraphone and marimba.

Friedman began studying drums in 1955, then added marimba and xylophone in the 1960s at Juilliard; while a student there, he also studied with Hall Overton and Teddy Charles. In the 1960s he was a member of the New York Philharmonic and the pit orchestra of the Metropolitan Opera, and worked as a jazz musician with Wayne Shorter, Joe Chambers, Hubert Laws, Horace Silver, and Horacee Arnold in the 1970s. He and Dave Samuels played together in drum workshops before starting a project in 1975, called The Mallet Duo. They also assembled a quartet called Double Image during the years 1977–1980. Friedman later worked with Daniel Humair and Chet Baker, and taught at the Manhattan School of Music and in Montreux in the 1970s. He moved to Berlin in 2021.

== Discography ==
=== As leader ===
- Winter Love April Joy (East Wind, 1975)
- Futures Passed (Enja, 1977)
- Of the Wind's Eye (Enja, 1981)
- Shades of Change with Geri Allen, Anthony Cox, Ronnie Burrage (Enja, 1986)
- Junkyard with David Charles (DMP, 1992)
- Ternaire with Daniel Humair, Jean-Francois Jenny-Clark (Deux Z, 1992)
- Air Sculpture (Traumton, 1994)
- Other Worlds with Anthony Cox, Jean-Louis Matinier (Intuition, 1997)
- Birds of a Feather with Jasper Van't Hof (Traumton, 1999)
- Earfood (Skip, 2004)
- Weaving Through Motion (Traumton, 2014)
- Rodney's Parallel Universe (Skip, 2007)
- Retro with Peter Weniger (Skip, 2010)
- Thursday (Malletmuse, 2018)
- Flight (Malletmuse, 2019)

With Double Image

- Double Image (Inner City, 1977)
- Dawn (ECM, 1979)
- Dialogues: Three Duets for Marimba, and Vibraphone (Marimba, 1985)
- In Lands I Never Saw (Celestial Harmonies, 1986)
- Open Hand (DMP, 1994)
- Moment to Moment (Double Image 2006)

With Four Drummers Drumming

- Four Drummers Drumming (Backyard, 1990)
- Electricity (Backyard, 1991)

=== As sideman ===
With Tim Buckley

- Happy Sad (Elektra, 1969)
- Blue Afternoon (Straight, 1969)
- Once I Was (Strange Fruit, 1999)
- Works in Progress (Rhino, 1999)
- The Copenhagen Tapes (PLR, 2000)

With Daniel Humair

- Triple Hip Trip (Owl, 1979)
- Surrounded 1964/87 (Blue Flame, 1987)
- Ear Mix (Sketch, 2003)

With Jazzanova

- Another New Day/L.O.V.E. and You & I (Ropeadope, 2002)
- In Between (JCR, 2002)
- Remixed (JCR, 2003)

With Hubert Laws

- Afro-Classic (CTI, 1970)
- Morning Star (CTI, 1972)
- The Rite of Spring (CTI, 1972)
- Carnegie Hall (CTI, 1973)
- In the Beginning (CTI, 1974)
- Then There Was Light Volume 1 (CTI, 1974)
- Then There Was Light Volume 2 (CTI, 1974)

With Yoko Ono

- Feeling the Space (Apple, 1973)
- Season of Glass (Geffen, 1981)
- It's Alright (I See Rainbows) (Polydor, 1982)

With Beth Orton

- Best Bit (Heavenly, 1997)
- Central Reservation (Heavenly, 1999)
- Trailer Park (Heavenly, 2009)

With Rosie

- Better Late Than Never (RCA Victor, 1976)

With others

- Horace Arnold, Tribe (Columbia, 1973)
- Horace Arnold, Tales of the Exonerated Flea (Columbia, 1974)
- Chet Baker, She Was Too Good to Me (CTI, 1974)
- Chet Baker, Peace (Enja, 1982)
- Blood, Sweat & Tears, More Than Ever (Columbia, 1976)
- George Benson, Good King Bad (CTI, 1976)
- Jane Ira Bloom, Second Wind (Outline, 1980)
- Jane Ira Bloom, Modern Drama (Columbia, 1987)
- Elbow Bones and the Racketeers, New York at Dawn (Hot Shot, 2012)
- Brecker Brothers, Back to Back (Arista, 1976)
- Joe Chambers, The Almoravid (Muse, 1974)
- Chic, Chic (Atlantic, 1977)
- John Clark, Faces (ECM, 1981)
- Cy Coleman, The Party's On Me (RCA Victor, 1976)
- Hank Crawford, Wildflower (Kudu, 1973)
- Four Tops, Tonight (Casablanca, 1981)
- Bob Franke, For Real (Flying Fish, 1986)
- Aretha Franklin, Get It Right (Arista, 1983)
- Henry Gaffney, Waiting for a Wind (RCA, 1976)
- Henry Gaffney, On Again Off Again (Manhattan, 1978)
- Jerry Granelli, Another Place (veraBra, 1993)
- Janis Ian, Who Really Cares (Verve Forecast, 1969)
- Joe Jackson, Will Power (A&M, 1987)
- Bob James, One (CTI, 1974)
- Bob James, The Genie (Tappan Zee, 1983)
- Billy Joel, 52nd Street (Columbia, 1978)
- Kid Creole and the Coconuts, Doppelganger (Sire, 1983)
- Gershon Kingsley, First Moog Quartet (Audio Fidelity, 1970)
- Earl Klugh, Late Night Guitar (Liberty, 1980)
- Luther Vandross, Luther (Cotillion, 1976)
- Luther Vandross, This Close to You (Cotillion, 1977)
- Charlie Mariano, Seventy (veraBra, 1993)
- Ralph MacDonald, Sound of a Drum (Marlin, 1976)
- Ralph MacDonald, The Path (Marlin, 1978)
- Micatone, Ninesongs (No Zession, 2001)
- Bob Moses, When Elephants Dream of Music (Gramavision, 1983)
- Idris Muhammad, Boogie to the Top (Kudu, 1978)
- Lauren Newton, Timbre (hat, 1983)
- Judy Niemack, About Time (Sony, 2002)
- Laura Nyro, Smile (Columbia, 1976)
- David Pomeranz, Time to Fly (Decca, 1971)
- Michel Portal, Any Way (Label Bleu, 1993)
- Gary Portnoy, Gary Portnoy (Sony, 1992)
- Jim Pugh, Dave Taylor, The Pugh-Taylor Project (DMP, 1984)
- Dino Saluzzi, Anthony Cox, David Friedman, Rios (Intuition, 1995)
- Larry Schneider, So Easy (Label Bleu, 1988)
- Don Sebesky, Giant Box (CTI, 1973)
- Wayne Shorter, Odyssey of Iska (Blue Note, 1971)
- Horace Silver, In Pursuit of the 27th Man (Blue Note, 1973)
- Grace Slick, Dreams (RCA, 1980)
- Keith Sykes, Keith Sykes (Vanguard, 1969)
- Stanley Turrentine, The Sugar Man (CTI, 1975)
- Frankie Valli, Lady Put the Light Out (Private Stock, 1977)
- Grover Washington Jr., Soul Box (Kudu, 1973)
- Kenny Wheeler, Greenhouse Fables (Sentemo, 1992)
