= Ed Caraeff =

American photographer, illustrator and graphic designer

- Born: April 18, 1950 (age 76); California, US
- Occupations: Photographer, art director, illustrator, designer
- Years active: 1967–present

Ed Caraeff (born April 18, 1950) is an American photographer, illustrator and graphic designer who has worked largely in the music industry.

He has art directed, photographed and designed more than 400 record album covers from 1967 to 1981 for numerous artists, including the "Incense and Peppermints" album cover for Strawberry Alarm Clock, Bee Gees, Elton John, Steely Dan, Carly Simon, Three Dog Night, Tom Waits and Dolly Parton. His photography has appeared on the cover of four issues of Rolling Stone magazine and is included in the permanent collection of the Rock and Roll Hall of Fame.

Caraeff's photograph of Jimi Hendrix at the Monterey Pop Festival has been reproduced in various articles and was included in his 2017 book Burning Desire: The Jimi Hendrix Experience through the Lens of Ed Caraeff.

== Career ==
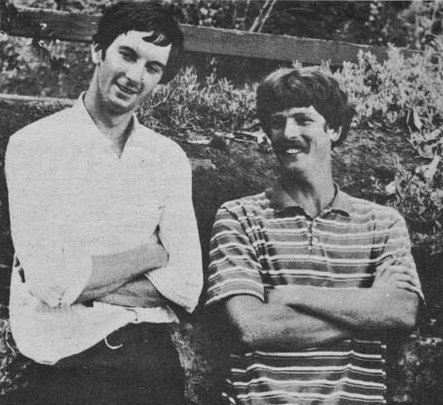
Steve Boone (left) and Jerry Yester of The Lovin' Spoonful, taken at their show with Simon & Garfunkel at the Hollywood Bowl, July 28, 1967. Photo by Ed Caraeff.

Caraeff's photographs have been inducted into the Rock and Roll Hall of Fame and used in many different media, including album covers, TV ads, magazines, radio posters, promotional posters, and merchandise. He has also photographed and created album covers for numerous artists, including Bee Gees, Elton John, Dolly Parton, Little Richard, Jim Morrison, Neil Diamond, Barry Manilow, the Carpenters, Hall & Oates, Dwight Twilley, Tom Petty & the Heartbreakers, Cheech & Chong, Steely Dan, Marvin Gaye, Carly Simon, Tim Buckley and Jose Feliciano, among others.

In 1979, Ed Caraeff was commissioned by music producer Robert Stigwood to shoot the cover for the Bee Gees' album Spirits Having Flown.

Caraeff stepped away from his camera in 1981 with the Private Eyes album by Hall & Oates to pursue his next dream of becoming a chef. In 1987 Rolling Stone magazine asked him for permission to use a forgotten picture of Jimi Hendrix as a magazine cover.
