= Song to the Siren =

Composition by Tim Buckley and Larry Beckett

Song by Tim Buckley

from the album Starsailor
- Released: November 1970
- Recorded: 1969
- Genre: Folk
- Length: 3:28
- Label: Straight
- Composer: Tim Buckley
- Lyricist: Larry Beckett
- Producer: Tim Buckley

Audio samples
- from Starsailor: file; help
- from Morning Glory: The Tim Buckley Anthology: file; help

"Song to the Siren" is a song written by Tim Buckley and Larry Beckett, first released by Buckley on his 1970 album Starsailor. It was later included on Morning Glory: The Tim Buckley Anthology, featuring a performance of the song from the final episode of The Monkees.

Pat Boone was the first to release a recording of the song on his 1969 album Departure, predating Buckley's version. The song has become one of Buckley's most well-known works due to numerous covers by various artists following his death in 1975, most notably by This Mortal Coil in 1983.

== Background ==
"Song to the Siren" was written in 1967, but Buckley was dissatisfied with early recording attempts. The song was eventually released three years later on his album Starsailor.

In 1968, Buckley first performed the song solo in its original folk style as a guest on the series finale of The Monkees, in the key of E Major, accompanied only by Buckley's twelve-string acoustic guitar. Later he recorded a lusher one for Starsailor in B-flat Major, featuring heavy use of a Leslie speaker and reverb and on the electric guitar and high-pitched background vocals.

Additionally, the 1968 performance contained different lyrics. The line "I am puzzled as the oyster" in the final verse was changed to "I'm as puzzled as the newborn child" on the album. This alteration reportedly occurred after Buckley played the song for Judy Henske, wife of producer Jerry Yester, who laughed at the original line.

Buckley and Beckett regarded this song as their greatest collaboration. Beckett later stated, "It's a perfect match of melody and lyrics. There was some kind of uncanny connection between us."

The song's reference to the sirens luring sailors stems from Greek mythology. Its lyrical style reflects Larry Beckett's literary influences, contrasting with Buckley's more personal songwriting approach.

== Larry Beckett ==
Beckett wrote the lyrics to "Song to the Siren" as part of his ongoing collaboration and friendship with Buckley during their high school years. Beckett has also worked alongside English musician, vocalist, and songwriter Stuart Anthony in various capacities. Their collaboration began in 2014 with the Lancaster-based band The Long Lost Band when Beckett started contributing lyrics to their work. "Song to the Siren" became part of this collaboration when Beckett visited the UK for two tour dates in 2015—in Liverpool and Lancaster.

The live version of the song featured a spoken word segment by Beckett, in which he explained the origin of the lyrics, a narrative previously included in documentary footage about the author. A studio version was later recorded in 2016 to mirror the live performance, making this rendition particularly notable. Among the many cover versions of the song, this was the first time the lyricist himself appeared on the track. The Larry Beckett and The Long Lost Band version was released online on October 21, 2016.

Additionally, the song was performed live by Stuart Anthony aboard the Odysseia, a replica of an ancient Greek ship, setting sail from Lefkada. This performance symbolized a spiritual "homecoming" for the song, as the surroundings are believed to represent Homer's Ithaca.

== This Mortal Coil version ==
"Song to the Siren"

Single by This Mortal Coil

from the album It'll End in Tears
- Released: September 1983
- Genre: Dream pop; synth-pop
- Length: 3:30
- Label: 4AD
- Songwriters: Larry Beckett; Tim Buckley

This Mortal Coil recorded a version of "Song to the Siren", released as their debut single in September 1983. It entered the UK Independent Singles Chart at No. 31 on 24 September and reached No. 3 on 5 November. The song charted on the UK Singles Chart, peaking at No. 66 on 22 October. The single remained on the UK Indie Chart for 101 weeks, ranking fourth in the 1980s behind "Bela Lugosi's Dead" by Bauhaus (131 weeks), "Blue Monday" by New Order (186 weeks), and "Love Will Tear Us Apart" by Joy Division (195 weeks).

"Song to the Siren" was later included on This Mortal Coil's 1984 album It'll End in Tears. This Mortal Coil was a musical collective led by producer Ivo Watts-Russell, featuring musicians from the 4AD label. Singer Elizabeth Fraser and guitarist Robin Guthrie of the Cocteau Twins, both signed to 4AD at the time, performed on this version. Fraser also recorded a duet with Tim Buckley's son, Jeff Buckley.

The release of This Mortal Coil's version led to a renewed interest in Tim Buckley's work. This revival led to increased posthumous sales of Buckley's music, and contributed to Jeff Buckley's early success.

This Mortal Coil's version appears prominently in David Lynch's 1997 film Lost Highway, though it is not included on the soundtrack album. Lynch had originally intended to use the song in his 1986 film Blue Velvet, but the licensing costs were too high. As a result, he collaborated with composer Angelo Badalamenti to create "Mysteries of Love".

The song was featured in the 2009 film The Lovely Bones to critical acclaim.

== Other covers and versions ==
The song has been covered numerous times, including by The Cocteau Twins, John Frusciante, Sinéad O'Connor Rose Betts, and Dead Can Dance on their live album In Concert.

== Sources ==
- Aston, Martin (2013). Facing the Other Way: The Story of 4AD. London: The Friday Project. ISBN 978-0-00-748961-9.
