= Blue Afternoon =

Studio album by Tim Buckley
- Released: 24 November 1969
- Recorded: 1969
- Genres: Psychedelic folk; folk jazz
- Length: 40:47
- Labels: Straight (LP); Enigma Retro (CD)
- Producer: Tim Buckley

Tim Buckley chronology
Happy Sad (1969)	Blue Afternoon (1969)	Lorca (1970)

Professional ratings
Review scores
Source	Rating
AllMusic	4/5 stars
The Encyclopedia of Popular Music	4/5 stars

Blue Afternoon is the fourth studio album by Tim Buckley, released in November 1969. It is Tim Buckley's first self-produced record and his debut for Herb Cohen and Frank Zappa's label Straight Records. The album used the same group of musicians as Happy Sad (1969) with the addition of drummer Jimmy Madison. It presaged Buckley's most experimental work on his subsequent two albums.

Several tracks on Blue Afternoon are songs Buckley had intended to record on earlier albums but had not completed. "Chase the Blues Away" and "Happy Time" are numbers he had worked on in the summer of 1968 for possible inclusion on Happy Sad and demos can be heard on the Rhino label's Works in Progress album.

Blue Afternoon, like Starsailor, was re-released as a stand-alone album on CD format only once in the United States, in 1989 on the Enigma Retro label. It was then later re-issued by Warners/Rhino Records UK in 2011 as part of the Original Album Series box set, with Buckley's four LPs released on Elektra Records, and again in 2017 by Rhino as part of the collection Tim Buckley - The Complete Album Collection, featuring his first 7 albums plus a re-release of Works in Progress.

== Chart performance ==
The album debuted on Billboard magazine's Top LP's chart in the issue dated February 7, 1970, peaking at No. 192 during a two-week run on the chart.

== Track listing ==
All tracks are written by Tim Buckley.

Side one
No.	Title	Length
1.	"Happy Time"	3:15
2.	"Chase the Blues Away"	5:14
3.	"I Must Have Been Blind"	3:40
4.	"The River"	5:47

Side two
No.	Title	Length
1.	"So Lonely"	3:27
2.	"Café"	5:40
3.	"Blue Melody"	4:55
4.	"The Train"	7:53

== Personnel ==
- Tim Buckley – 12-string guitar, vocals
- Lee Underwood – guitar, piano
- Steve Khan – guitar on "Happy Time" and "So Lonely"
- David Friedman – vibraphone
- John Miller – acoustic and electric bass
- Jimmy Madison – drums
- Carter C.C. Collins – congas on "Blue Melody"

Technical

- Dick Kunc – engineer, technical production
- John Williams – design, photography
- Frank Bez – photography

== Charts ==
Chart (1970)	Peak position
US Billboard Top LPs	192
