= Bernie Andrews =

- Born: Bernard Oliver Andrews; 17 August 1933; Woolwich, London
- Died: 11 June 2010 (aged 76)
- Occupation: Radio producer
- Years active: 1957–1984

Bernard Oliver Andrews (17 August 1933 – 11 June 2010) was an English BBC radio producer, who was instrumental in the careers of many emerging rock and pop bands from the 1960s onwards, and responsible for producing such programmes as Saturday Club and John Peel's shows.

== Early life ==
Born in Woolwich, south east London, Andrews was raised in Eltham, and completed his national service in the RAF. After working as a Post Office telephone engineer, he joined the BBC as a technical (tape machine) operator in 1957, later being promoted to producer. In the early 1960s, he began producing Saturday Club, one of the few programmes on the BBC Light Programme to feature pop music, and frequently booked and recorded The Beatles, along with many other leading groups and artists of the time. He also booked The Rolling Stones; the group failed their first BBC radio audition, but Andrews used them as a backing band for Bo Diddley and re-recorded their performances of some of their own numbers, enabling them to pass on the second occasion as a "trial broadcast".

== Work with Radio 1 and the BBC ==
Later in the 1960s, he became the first producer of the new Radio 1 programme Top Gear, with John Peel as the main presenter. He was also responsible for producing the very popular BBC Radio 1's Top 20 show presented by Tom Browne in the early 1970s, working alongside engineer Pete Ritzema. He recorded the first BBC sessions of Led Zeppelin, David Bowie and Fairport Convention among others. After the close working partnership between him and Peel was broken up, he became the main producer for Anne Nightingale in the 1970s. He was known for his record library, at one time owning a collection of every 45rpm pop record released in Britain since 1958 later sold to Elton John. He was also responsible for retaining many of the tapes of BBC radio session recordings, against the rules, which would otherwise have been wiped or discarded for the sake of economy, and which in subsequent years were released officially, notably in the BBC Sessions series. His collection also included material from The Goon Show's recording sessions, including a number of complete episodes. Some of this material has been included on Volumes 8, 9 and 10 of The Goon Show Compendium CD box sets, provided by John Beecher of Rollercoaster Records, who purchased the collection from Andrews to preserve it after the BBC allegedly reneged on a negotiated agreement to compensate him for storing the tapes for many decades.

Bernie Andrews retired in 1984, and later lived in Spain and Dorset. He died in 2010 at the age of 76.
