= Tim Buckley (album) =

Studio album by Tim Buckley
- Released: October 1966
- Recorded: August 1966
- Studio: Sunset Sound, Los Angeles
- Genre: Folk
- Length: 34:05
- Label: Elektra
- Producer: Jac Holzman, Paul A. Rothchild

Tim Buckley chronology
Tim Buckley (1966)	Goodbye and Hello (1967)

Singles from Tim Buckley
- 1. "Wings"/"Grief in My Soul"; 2. "Aren't You the Girl"/"Strange Street Affair Under Blue"

Tim Buckley is the debut album by Los Angeles based singer-songwriter Tim Buckley, released in October 1966. Most of the songs on it were co-written by Buckley and Larry Beckett while they were in high school. It was recorded at Sunset Sound in Los Angeles, California.

The album was re-released in 2001 in a compilation with follow up album Goodbye and Hello by WEA/Elektra, then again in 2005, this time coupled with Greetings from L.A..

Rhino Handmade Records reissued the album in 2011 as part of a two-disc set. The first disc contains both the stereo and mono versions of the album. The second disc contains 22 unreleased recordings Buckley made in 1965 with The Bohemians and in 1966 with Larry Beckett.

== Legacy ==
In a retrospective review for AllMusic, Richie Unterberger feels the album is Buckley's most straightforward and accessible, without the experimental touches that characterised his later work, though with an astounding lyrical and musical sophistication for a 19-year-old.

== Track listing ==
All songs by Tim Buckley, except where noted.

Side One

1. "I Can't See You" (Larry Beckett, Buckley) – 2:40
2. "Wings" – 2:30
3. "Song of the Magician" (Beckett, Buckley) – 3:05
4. "Strange Street Affair Under Blue" (Beckett, Buckley) – 3:10
5. "Valentine Melody" (Beckett, Buckley) – 3:40
6. "Aren't You the Girl?" – 2:01

Side Two

1. "Song Slowly Song" (Beckett, Buckley) – 4:13
2. "It Happens Every Time" – 1:49
3. "Song for Jainie" – 2:43
4. "Grief in My Soul" (Beckett, Buckley) – 2:03
5. "She Is" (Beckett, Buckley) – 3:05
6. "Understand Your Man" – 3:06

== Personnel ==
- Tim Buckley – guitar, vocals
- Lee Underwood – lead guitar
- Jim Fielder – bass guitar
- Van Dyke Parks – piano, celesta, harpsichord
- Billy Mundi – drums, percussion
- Jack Nitzsche – string arrangements

Technical

- Jac Holzman – recording supervisor
- Bruce Botnick – engineer
- William S. Harvey – design, photography
