= Tim Buckley =

American musician (1947–1975)

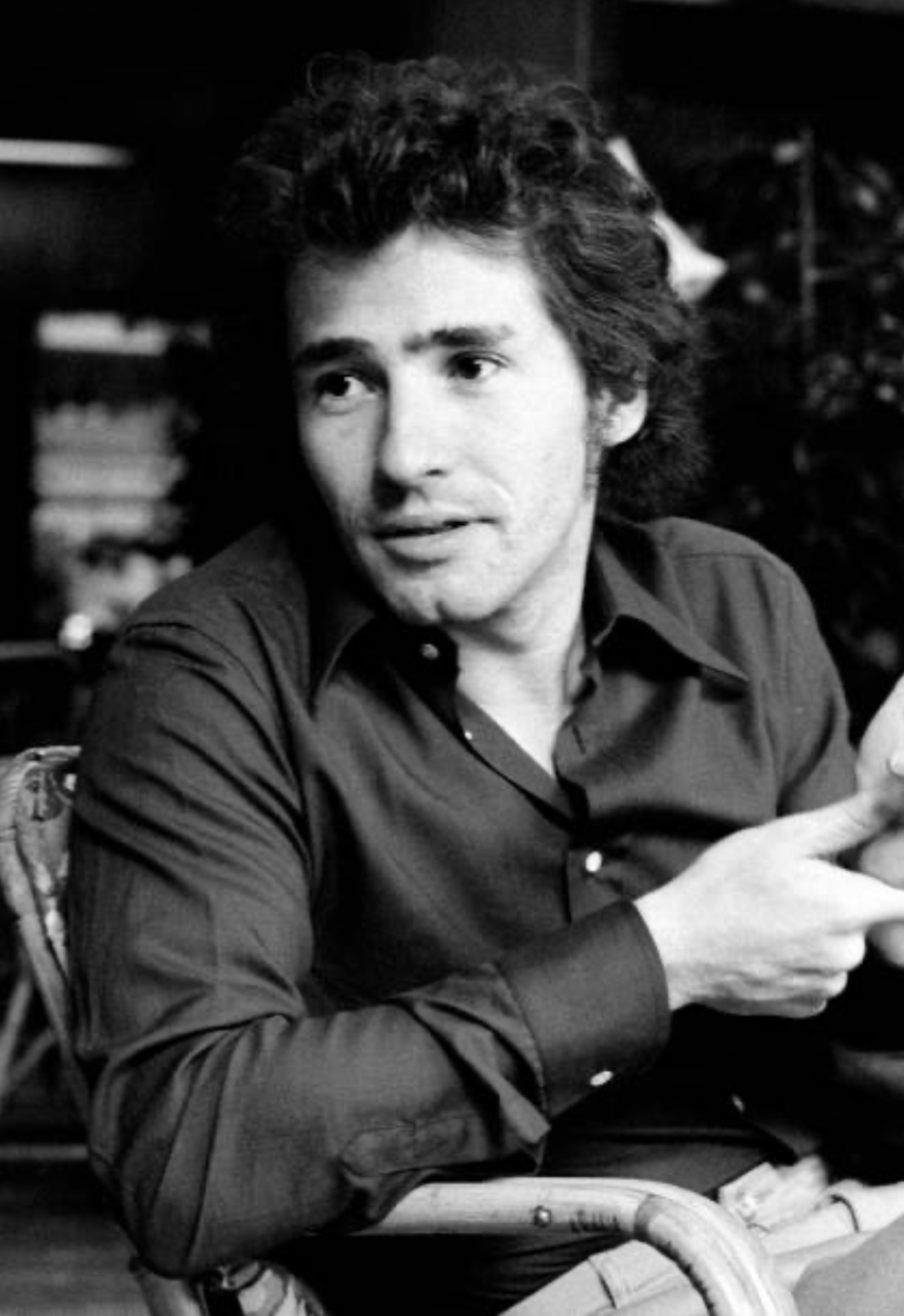
- Buckley photographed by Jørgen Angel, 1974

Background information
- Born: Timothy Charles Buckley III; February 14, 1947; Washington, D.C., U.S.
- Died: June 29, 1975 (aged 28) Los Angeles, California, U.S.
- Genres: Psychedelic folk; folk-jazz; avant-jazz; avant-folk; folk rock; funk
- Occupations: Musician; songwriter; record producer
- Instruments: Vocals; guitar
- Years active: 1966–1975
- Labels: Elektra; Straight; Warner Bros.; DiscReet
- Spouses: Mary Guibert (m. 1965; div. 1966); Judy Brejot Sutcliffe (m. 1970)
- Website: timbuckley.net

Timothy Charles Buckley III (February 14, 1947 – June 29, 1975) was an American musician. He began his career based in folk rock, but subsequently experimented with genres such as psychedelia, jazz, the avant-garde, and funk.

His commercial peak came with the 1969 album Happy Sad, reaching No. 81 on the charts, while his experimental 1970 album Starsailor went on to become a cult classic. The latter contained his best known song, "Song to the Siren."

Buckley died at the age of 28 from a heroin and morphine overdose. He left behind one biological son, Jeff Buckley, who himself was a highly regarded singer who also died young, as well as an adopted son, Taylor.

== Early life and career ==
Tim Buckley was born in Washington, D.C., on Valentine's Day, February 14, 1947, to Elaine (née Scalia), an Italian American, and Timothy Charles Buckley Jr., a decorated World War II veteran and son of Irish immigrants from County Cork. He has a sister named Kathleen. He spent his early childhood in Amsterdam, New York, an industrial city associated with carpet making. At five years old, Buckley began listening to his mother's progressive jazz recordings, particularly Miles Davis.

Buckley's musical life began after his family moved to Bell Gardens in southern California in 1956. His grandmother introduced him to the work of Bessie Smith and Billie Holiday, his mother to Frank Sinatra and Judy Garland and his father to the country music of Hank Williams and Johnny Cash. When the folk music revival came around in the early 1960s, Buckley at age 13 taught himself the banjo and, with several friends, formed a folk group inspired by The Kingston Trio that played local high school events.

During high school, Buckley was elected to student leadership positions, played on the baseball team and quarterbacked the football team. During a football game, he broke two fingers on his left hand, permanently damaging them. He said that the injury prevented him from playing barre chords. This disability may have led to his use of extended chords, many of which don't require barres.

Buckley attended Loara High School in Anaheim, California. He cut classes regularly and quit football, focusing most of his attention on music. He befriended Larry Beckett, his future lyricist, and Jim Fielder, a bass player with whom he formed two musical groups, the Bohemians, who initially played popular music, and the Harlequin 3, a folk group which regularly incorporated spoken word and beat poetry into their gigs.

Buckley and lyricist/friend Beckett wrote dozens of songs, some that appeared on Buckley's debut album, Tim Buckley. "Buzzin' Fly" was written during this period and was featured on Happy Sad, his 1969 LP.

Buckley's college career at Fullerton College lasted two weeks in 1965. After dropping out of college, Buckley dedicated himself fully to music and playing L.A. folk clubs. During the summer of 1965, he played regularly at a club co-founded by Dan Gordon. He played Orange County coffeehouses such as the White Room in Buena Park and the Monday-night hootenannies at the Los Angeles Troubadour.

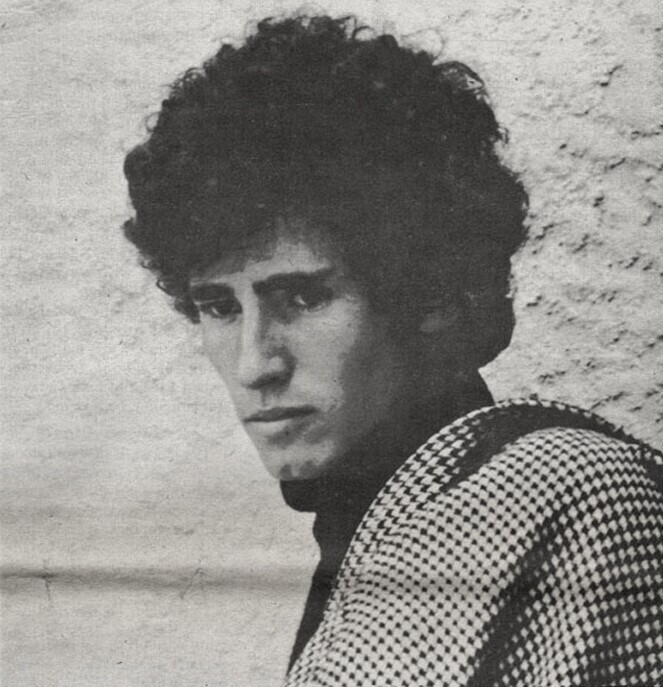
Buckley in 1966, age 19

In February 1966, following a gig at It's Boss, the Mothers of Invention's drummer Jimmy Carl Black recommended Buckley to the Mothers' manager, Herb Cohen. Cohen saw potential in Tim and landed him an extended gig at the Night Owl Cafe in Greenwich Village at West 3rd and MacDougal. Buckley's girlfriend, Jainie Goldstein, drove him to New York. While living in the Bowery with Jainie, Buckley ran into Lee Underwood and asked him to play guitar for him. The two became lifelong friends and collaborators.

Under Cohen's management, Buckley recorded a six-song demo acetate disc which he sent to Elektra records owner Jac Holzman, who offered him a recording contract.

== Folk rock ==
In August 1966, Buckley recorded his self-titled debut album in three days in Los Angeles. He later recalled: "I was only 19, and going into the studio was like Disneyland. I'd do anything anybody said." The record featured Buckley and a band of Underwood and Orange County friends. Underwood's mix of jazz and country improvisation on a Telecaster guitar became a distinctive part of Buckley's early sound. Jac Holzman and Paul Rothchild's production and Jack Nitzsche's string arrangements cemented the record's mid-'60s sound.

The album's folk-rock style was typical of the time, although many people, including Underwood, felt the strings by Nitzsche "did not enhance its musical quality." Critics took note of Buckley's distinctive voice and tuneful compositions.

"Song of The Magician"
from Tim Buckley
Demonstrating the sixties sound of the record

Underwood considered the record to be "a first effort, naive, stiff, quaky and innocent [but] a ticket into the marketplace". Holzman expressed similar sentiments and thought Buckley wasn't comfortable in his own musical skin. Larry Beckett suggested the band's desire to please audiences held it back.

Elektra released two singles promoting the debut album, "Wings" with "Grief in My Soul" as the B-side, and "Aren't You the Girl"/"Strange Street Affair Under Blue." Buckley followed with "Once Upon a Time" and "Lady Give Me Your Key", which were not well regarded but showed potential. Elektra decided not to release the songs as singles, and the songs remained in Elektra's record vaults. Rhino Records was unable to find "Lady Give Me Your Key" to include on its Morning Glory: The Tim Buckley Anthology, but the song was the title track on Light in the Attic Records' 2017 collection of the previously unissued 1967 acoustic sessions. "Once Upon A Time" surfaced on Rhino's Where The Action Is 1965–68 Los Angeles anthology in 2009.

Goodbye and Hello, released in 1967, featured late 1960s-style poetry and songs in different timings, and was an ambitious release for the 20-year-old Buckley. Reflecting the confidence Elektra had in Buckley and group, they were given free rein on the content of the album. Beckett continued as lyricist and the album consisted of Buckley originals and Beckett–Buckley collaborations. Critics noted the improved lyrical and melodic qualities of Buckley's music. Buckley's voice had developed since his last release and the press appreciated both his lower register and falsetto in equal measure.

"I Never Asked to Be Your Mountain"

"Pleasant Street"
both tracks from Goodbye and Hello

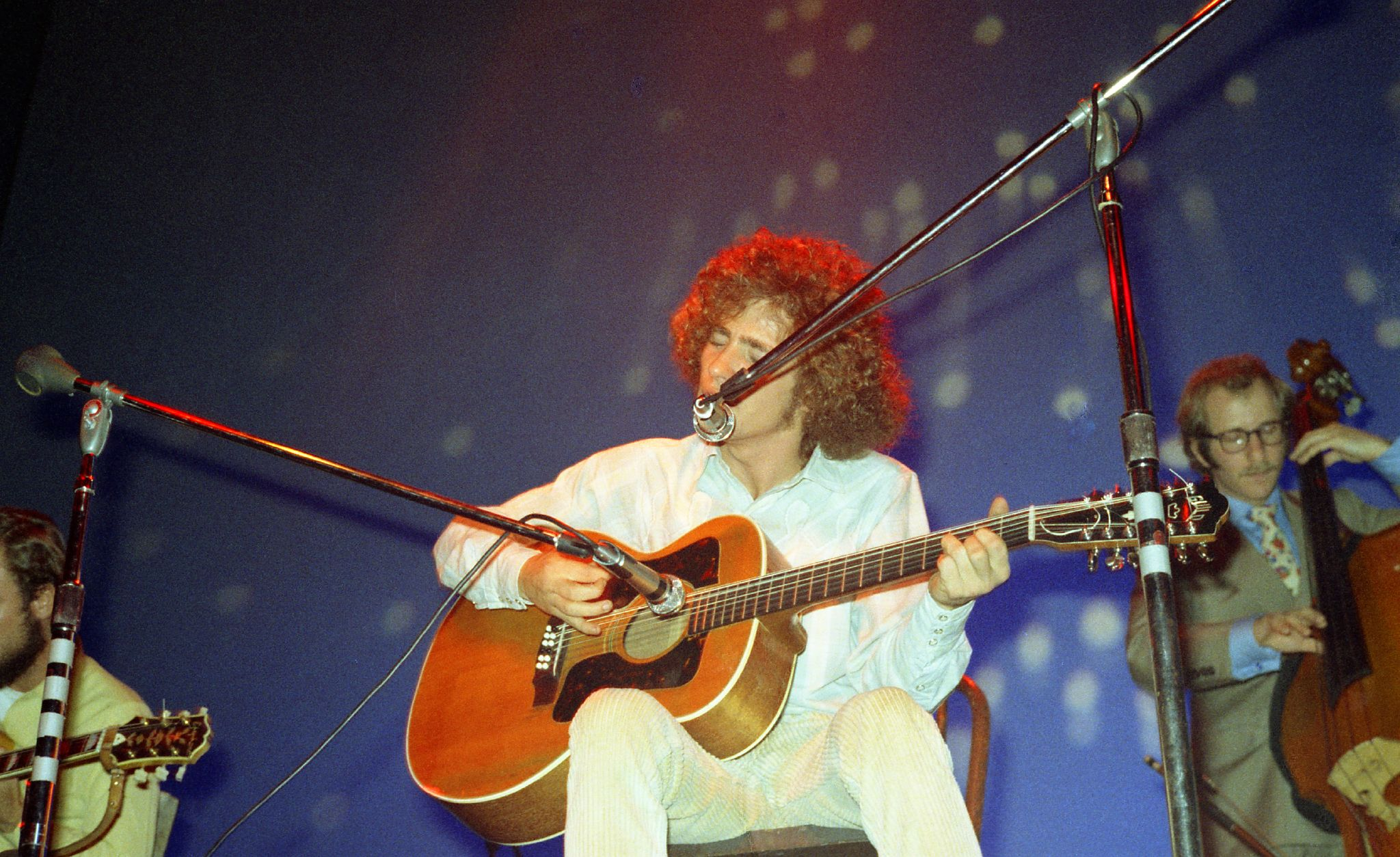
Buckley at the Fillmore East in 1968.

The subject of the album distinguished it from its predecessor. Beckett addressed the psychological nature of war in "No Man Can Find the War", and Underwood welcomed Buckley's entry into darker territory with "Pleasant Street". "I Never Asked to Be Your Mountain" represented a confessional lyric to his estranged wife and child, while the mix of introspective folk songs and political-themed content attracted folk fans and anti-war audiences. Holzman had faith in Buckley and rented advertising space for the musician on the Sunset Strip, an unusual step for a solo act. Buckley distanced himself from comparisons to Bob Dylan, expressing an apathy toward Dylan and his work. While Goodbye and Hello did not make Buckley a star, it performed better in the charts than his previous effort, peaking at No. 171.

Buckley's higher profile led to his album The Best of Tim Buckley being used as a soundtrack to the 1969 film Changes. Buckley performed "Song to the Siren" on the final episode of The Monkees. Buckley was wary of the press and often avoided interviews. After a slot on The Tonight Show, Buckley was standoffish and insulting toward guest host Alan King, and on another television appearance refused to lip sync to "Pleasant Street".

After Beckett was drafted into the Army, Buckley developed his own style, and described the jazz/blues-rock with which he was associated as "white thievery and an emotional sham." Drawing inspiration from jazz greats such as Charles Mingus, Thelonious Monk, Roland Kirk, and vocalist Leon Thomas, Buckley's sound became different from previous recordings.

In 1968, Buckley toured Europe twice, first including Denmark, the Netherlands, and England, appearing e.g. on John Peel's Top Gear radio show on the BBC and then appearing at the Internationale Essener Songtage in Germany, as well as touring England and Denmark again. Later that year, he recorded Happy Sad, which reflected folk and jazz influences and would be his best-charting album, peaking at No. 81.

== Middle period ==
During 1969, Buckley began to write and record material for three albums, Blue Afternoon, Lorca, and Starsailor. Inspired by the singing of avant-garde musician Cathy Berberian, he integrated the ideas of composers such as Luciano Berio and Iannis Xenakis in an avant-garde rock genre. Buckley selected eight songs for Blue Afternoon, an album similar to Happy Sad in style. In a 1977 article for DownBeat magazine, Lee Underwood wrote that Buckley's heart was not in Blue Afternoon and that the album was a perfunctory response to please his business partners.

While Buckley's music never sold well, his following releases did indeed chart. Lorca alienated his folk base, while Blue Afternoon was criticized as boring and tepid, and "[not] even good sulking music", although it has been re-evaluated over the years. Blue Afternoon was Buckley's last album to chart on Billboard, reaching No. 192. Following the albums, Buckley began to focus on what he felt to be his masterpiece, Starsailor.

Starsailor contained free jazz textures under Buckley's most extreme vocal performance, ranging from high shrieks to deep, soulful baritone. This personal album included the more accessible "Song to the Siren", a song which has since been covered by Robert Plant, John Frusciante, Bryan Ferry, This Mortal Coil, Sinéad O'Connor and Brendan Perry. The album was a critical and commercial failure upon release, despite having gained a considerable cult status following This Mortal Coil's cover, which renewed interest in it.

Unable to produce his music and almost broke, Buckley turned to alcohol and drug binges. He considered acting and completed an unreleased low-budget film entitled Why? (1971). The film was an experimental use of the new medium video tape and was commissioned by Technicolor.

== "Sex funk" period ==
In 1970, Buckley disbanded his Starsailor ensemble and assembled a new funk band. He cut three albums, Greetings from L.A., Sefronia and Look at the Fool. Buckley had alienated much of his hippie fan base with his previous two albums, and his sexually frank lyrics ("whip me, spank me") prevented the songs from receiving airplay, although he retained a cult following.

In 1975, Buckley engaged the press regarding a live album comeback. He began performing revamped versions of material drawn from his career, except Starsailor and Lorca, in response to his audience, which he had spurned in the past.

== Death ==
On June 28, 1975, Buckley completed a short tour with a show in Dallas, playing to a sold-out crowd of 1,800 people. He celebrated the end of the tour with a weekend of drinking with his band and friends. On the evening of June 29, he accompanied longtime friend Richard Keeling to his house. At some point, Keeling produced a bag of heroin, some of which Buckley snorted.

Buckley's friends took him home and, seeing his inebriated state, his wife Judy laid him on the living-room floor and questioned his friends as to what had happened. She moved Buckley into bed. When she checked on him later, she found that he was not breathing and had turned blue. Attempts by friends and paramedics to revive him were unsuccessful, and he was pronounced dead on arrival.

The coroner's report stated that Buckley died at 9:42 p.m. on June 29, 1975, from "acute heroin/morphine and ethanol intoxication due to inhalation and ingestion of overdose".

=== Aftermath ===
Buckley's tour manager, Bob Duffy, said Buckley's death was not expected, but "was like watching a movie, and that was its natural ending."

Other friends saw his passing as predictable, if not inevitable. Beckett recalled how Buckley took chances with his life, including dangerous driving, drinking alcohol, taking pills and heroin.

Given the circumstances of his death, Keeling was charged with murder and distribution of heroin. At his hearing on August 14, 1975, Keeling pleaded guilty to involuntary manslaughter and, after failing to complete community service, was sentenced to 120 days in jail and four years' probation.

Buckley died in debt, owning only a guitar and an amplifier. About 200 friends and family attended his funeral at the Wilshire Funeral Home in Santa Monica, including manager Herb Cohen and Lee Underwood. His eight-year-old son, Jeff, had met his father only once, spending a week with him and his new family, and was not invited to the funeral. Jeff Buckley said not being invited to his father's funeral "gnawed" at him, and prompted him to pay his respects by performing "I Never Asked to Be Your Mountain" in 1991 at a memorial tribute to Buckley in Brooklyn.

== Personal life ==
During French class in 1964, Buckley met Mary Guibert. Their relationship inspired some of Buckley's music, and provided both of them time away from their respective turbulent home lives. After almost a year of dating, Buckley and Guibert married on October 25, 1965. When Guibert became pregnant, Buckley decided to abandon her and their unborn child. The couple divorced in October 1966, about a month before their son, Jeff Buckley, was born. Jeff later said about his father, "He left my mother when I was six months old ... So I never really knew him at all. We were born with the same parts but when I sing it's me. This is my own time and if people expect me to work the same things for them as he did, they're going to be disappointed."

In April 1970, Buckley married Judy Brejot Sutcliffe in Santa Monica, and adopted her son, Taylor Keith Sutcliffe.

== Discography ==
=== Studio albums ===
Title	Details	Peak chart positions
Title	Details	US
Tim Buckley	Released: October 1966; Label: Elektra; Format: LP	—
Goodbye and Hello	Released: August 1967; Label: Elektra; Format: LP	171
Happy Sad	Released: April 1969; Label: Elektra; Format: LP	81
Blue Afternoon	Released: November 24, 1969; Label: Straight, Enigma; Format: LP, CD	192
Lorca	Released: June 1970; Label: Elektra; Format: LP	—
Starsailor	Released: November 1970; Label: Straight; Format: LP	—
Greetings from L.A.	Released: August 1972; Label: Straight, Enigma; Format: LP	—
Sefronia	Released: September 1973; Label: DiscReet; Format: LP	—
Look at the Fool	Released: September 13, 1974; Label: DiscReet; Format: LP	—

=== Live albums ===
- Dream Letter: Live in London 1968 (Enigma/Manifesto) (1990)
- Peel Sessions (Dutch East India/Strange Fruit) (1991/1993)
- Live at the Troubadour 1969 (Rhino/Manifesto) (1994)
- Honeyman: Live 1973 (Edsel/Manifesto) (1995)
- Once I Was (Varese) (1999)
- Copenhagen Tapes (Pinnacle Licensed Repertoire) (2000)
- Live at the Folklore Center 1967 (Tompkins Square) (2009)
- Venice Mating Call (Edsel) (2017)
- Greetings From West Hollywood (Edsel) (2017)
- Live at the Electric Theatre Co., Chicago 1968 (Manifesto) (2019)
- Bear's Sonic Journals: Merry-Go-Round at the Carousel (Owsley Stanley Foundation) (2021)

=== Compilations ===
- The Late Great Tim Buckley (WEA) (1978) – Released in Australia only
- The Best of Tim Buckley (Rhino) (1983)
- Morning Glory (Band of Joy) (1994)
- Works in Progress (Rhino Handmade) (1999)
- The Dream Belongs to Me: Rare and Unreleased 1968–1973 (Manifesto) (2001)
- Morning Glory: The Tim Buckley Anthology (Rhino) (2001)
- Tim Buckley/Goodbye and Hello (Elektra) (2001) – Compilation of first two albums
- Take 2: Greetings from L.A./Tim Buckley (Straight/Enigma) (2005) – 2×CD compilation of the two albums
- Tim Buckley (Rhino Handmade) (2011) – Handmade 2×CD
  - Disc One: Both the stereo and mono versions of his debut album
  - Disc Two: 22 unreleased recordings of Buckley from November 1965 with the Bohemians (12 tracks) and from 1966 with Larry Beckett (10 tracks)
- Starsailor: The Anthology (Music Club Deluxe/Rhino) (2011) – 2×CD
- Wings: The Complete Singles 1966–1974 (Omnivore Recordings) (2016)

=== Other releases ===
- Thin Wires in the Voice (1999) – 120-page booklet with a three-track CD EP included
- Tim Buckley: My Fleeting House (MVD Visual) (2007) – DVD of filmed live performances
- Tim Buckley: Lady, Give Me Your Key: The Unissued 1967 Solo Acoustic Sessions (Future Days Recordings) (2016) – Demos from Buckley's 1967 sessions

== Books ==
- Once He Was: the Tim Buckley Story (1997) Paul Barrera
- Thin Wires in the Voice (1999) Luca Ferrari (writer)
- Dream Brother: The Lives and Music of Jeff and Tim Buckley (2001) David Browne
- Blue Melody: Tim Buckley Remembered (2002) Lee Underwood
- Voci da una nuvola – Il segreto di Nick Drake e Tim Buckley (2015) Giampiero La Valle

== Tribute albums ==
- Sing a Song for You: Tribute to Tim Buckley (Manifesto) (2000)
- Dream Brother: The Songs of Tim and Jeff Buckley (Full Time Hobby/Rykodisc) (2005)
