= Straight Records =

American record label

- Parent company: Warner Bros. (1969–2012); Zappa (2012–present)
- Founded: 1969; 56 years ago
- Founder: Frank Zappa; Herb Cohen
- Status: Defunct; Zappa-related recordings were reverted to the Zappa Family Trust and Zappa Records, while non-Zappa recordings reverted to Warner Bros.
- Distributor(s): CBS (United Kingdom; 1969); Reprise/Warner Bros. (United States, later worldwide; 1969–2012); Zappa (Worldwide; 2012–present)
- Genre: Various
- Country of origin: United States
- Location: Los Angeles, California, United States

Straight Records, self-identified simply as Straight, was a record label formed in 1969 to distribute productions and discoveries of Frank Zappa and his business partner/manager Herb Cohen. Straight was formed at the same time as a companion label, Bizarre Records. Straight and Bizarre were manufactured and distributed in the U.S. by the Warner Bros. Records family of labels, which also included Reprise Records. Straight recordings were distributed in the U.K. by CBS Records.

Frank Zappa chose the majority of the artists for the Straight label. His original intention was to release albums by avant-garde artists on Bizarre, and recordings by more mainstream artists on Straight. However the original concept failed to work out as expected due to issues with record distribution and artist management. Frank Zappa, the Mothers of Invention, Wild Man Fischer, and Lenny Bruce certainly fit in at Bizarre, but all others ended up on Straight. This led to some very unusual albums on the Straight label especially those by Captain Beefheart, Alice Cooper and the GTOs.

Zappa was also responsible for the Persuasions' first LP, Acapella. Over the phone he heard the Persuasions singing live in a Jersey City record shop. Due to his passion for doo-wop Zappa immediately flew the vocal group to Los Angeles to record. Other notable Straight artists included Tim Buckley, and the duo of Judy Henske & Jerry Yester. These musicians came to the label through an association with manager Herb Cohen.

The first issue of Love It to Death by Alice Cooper was on Straight. However, by the time the album became a success it had already been re-issued on Warner Bros. Starting in 1972 this and other Straight recordings were re-issued by either Reprise or Warner Bros. By 1973 the Bizarre and Straight distribution agreement with Warner ended. Under a new agreement starting that year Zappa and Cohen's business ventures with Warner were merged and renamed to create DiscReet Records. The Zappa/Cohen business partnership ended acrimoniously with litigation from both sides in 1976. In the settlement, reached a few years later, Zappa retained ownership of his work and Herb Cohen assumed ownership of most of the non-Zappa material from Bizarre, Straight and DiscReet.

In 1988 and 1989 Straight recordings by Captain Beefheart, Alice Cooper, Tim Buckley, the GTOs, the Persuasions, and Lord Buckley were briefly re-issued on CD and cassette by the Enigma Retro label. Zappa died at age 52 in 1993. Cohen died at age 77 in 2010.

Rumors have been made that since the early 1990s the ownership of some Straight recordings has become unclear. This may have prevented further re-issues of some Straight material. By the late 2000s, however, some of these recordings (such as Tim Buckley's Blue Afternoon and Starsailor, and Captain Beefheart's Lick My Decals Off Baby) have since been reissued on 180-gram vinyl and have been made available for sale on the iTunes Store. They have not, however, been reissued on CD. Whilst it has not been officially stated, it is believed that the clause preventing these albums' re-release only covered CD releases and not other formats. However, tracks from them have been licensed for and appeared on CD compilations in recent years.

== List of Straight Records artists ==
- Captain Beefheart
- Alice Cooper
- Tim Buckley
- Jeff Simmons
- Junier Mintz (aka Frank Zappa and the Mothers)
- Lord Buckley
- Judy Henske & Jerry Yester
- The GTOs (Girls Together Outrageously)
- Tim Dawe
- Mayf Nutter
- The Persuasions
- Rosebud

== See also ==
- List of record labels
