= Starsailor (album) =

Studio album by Tim Buckley
- Released: November 1970
- Recorded: September 10–21, 1970
- Studios: Whitney Studios, Glendale, California
- Genres: Avant-rock; psychedelia; fusion
- Length: 36:00
- Label: Straight
- Producer: Tim Buckley

Tim Buckley chronology
Lorca (1970)	Starsailor (1970)	Greetings from L.A. (1972)

Starsailor is the sixth studio album by Tim Buckley, released on Herb Cohen's Straight Records label in November 1970. Starsailor marks Buckley's full embrace of avant-garde and jazz-rock styles into his music. Although it alienated elements of his fanbase upon release, it also contains his best known song, "Song to the Siren", which was written much earlier than the rest of the material. Bunk Gardner, a former member of the Mothers of Invention, joined Buckley's backing band to record the album. Buckley returned to working again with lyricist Larry Beckett, after a three-album hiatus.

Leontyne Price attended a concert in New York City during the supporting tour and told Buckley, "Boy, I wish they were writing things like that for us opera singers," to which Buckley responded, "Well, do what I did; get your own band."

== Renewed interest ==
"Song to the Siren" has been covered by a variety of artists, most notably by This Mortal Coil, featuring on their 1984 album It'll End in Tears. John Frusciante, in 2009, covered this song on his album The Empyrean. Amen Dunes covered the song on their 2015 EP release Cowboy Worship. The British trance act Lost Witness also released a remix single, entitled "Did I Dream (Song to the Siren)".

While the revival of "Song to the Siren" renewed interest in Buckley amongst independent artists in the 1980s, the success of his estranged son, Jeff Buckley, in the 1990s, inspired indie rock artists to look at the career of his father. The British band Starsailor took their name from this album.

The album had a brief reissue on CD by the Enigma Retro label, but like the other Tim Buckley release on the Straight Records label (1969's Blue Afternoon), it drifted out of print due to legal battles over who owned the rights to the music. This stems back to a 1976 separation and lawsuit between Herb Cohen and Frank Zappa, the co-owners of Straight Records. As a result, many of the albums released on Straight (including Captain Beefheart's Lick My Decals Off, Baby) are very difficult to find on CD. In 2006, the album was released on the iTunes Music Store, making it available to the general public once more. In 2007, 4 Men With Beards reissued the album on vinyl, as well as the rest of Tim Buckley's nine-album catalogue. However, CD copies of this and Blue Afternoon remained out of print and difficult to find on the market until the release in 2017 of The Complete Album Collection box set.

== Reception and legacy ==
Professional ratings
Review scores
Source	Rating
AllMusic	4.5/5 stars
DownBeat	5/5 stars
Christgau's Record Guide	C−

Starsailor was featured at #50 in Pitchfork's 2004 list of The 100 Best Albums of the 1970s. Reviewer Dominique Leone said of the album, "Starsailor is a masterpiece in every sense. It captured its maker at his freest and most willing to throw caution and sales to the wind, while simultaneously at his most creative and most capable of pulling off songs and moods that, from practically anyone else, would sound cartoonish, clumsy and confused."

In addition, Starsailor was selected as the 47th best rock record of all time in the 1987 book The Top 100 Rock 'n' Roll Albums of All Time.

In 2000 it was voted number 507 in Colin Larkin's All Time Top 1000 Albums.

== Track listing ==
All music written by Tim Buckley.

Side one
No.	Title	Lyrics by	Length
1.	"Come Here Woman"	Buckley	4:09
2.	"I Woke Up"	Larry Beckett	4:02
3.	"Monterey"	Beckett	4:30
4.	"Moulin Rouge"	Beckett	1:57
5.	"Song to the Siren"	Beckett, Buckley	3:26

Side two
No.	Title	Lyrics by	Length
1.	"Jungle Fire"	Buckley	4:42
2.	"Starsailor"	John Balkin, Beckett, Buckley	4:36
3.	"The Healing Festival"	Buckley	3:16
4.	"Down by the Borderline"	Buckley	5:22

== Personnel ==
Musicians

- Maury Baker – percussion
- John Balkin – double bass, electric bass
- Tim Buckley – guitar, 12-string guitar, vocals
- Bunk Gardner – alto flute, tenor saxophone
- Buzz Gardner – trumpet, flugelhorn
- Lee Underwood – guitar, piano, pipe organ

Technical

- Tim Buckley – producer
- Stan Agol – engineer
- Herb Cohen – executive producer

Visual

- Ed Thrasher – art direction and photography
- L.J. Moche – repackaging for 1989 remastered CD version
