= The Dolphins (song) =

Single by Fred Neil

from the album Fred Neil
- Released: January 1967
- Genre: Folk rock
- Length: 2:26
- Label: Elektra
- Songwriter: Fred Neil
- Producer: Nik Venet

"The Dolphins" is a song written and recorded by the American singer-songwriter Fred Neil and released in January 1967 on his eponymous second solo album Fred Neil, as well as being issued as a single.

Writer Mark Brend described the song's lyrics as "ambivalent and elusive", and its use of a chorus line "I've been searching for the dolphins in the sea" is purely a metaphorical one. Nevertheless Neil, who had been interested in dolphins since the mid-1960s when he began visiting the Miami Seaquarium, went on to found the Dolphin Research Project with Ric O'Barry in 1970, an organization dedicated to stopping the capture, trafficking and exploitation of dolphins worldwide.

The song was frequently performed by Tim Buckley, who had been present during Neil's recording of the song on October 11, 1966, although Buckley did not record his own version until his album Sefronia in 1973.

Since 1967 the song has also been recorded by other notable artists such as Al Wilson (1968), Linda Ronstadt (1969), Harry Belafonte (1969), It's A Beautiful Day (1970), Ritchie Havens (live, 1972), Billy Bragg (1991), Eddi Reader (1992), The The (1993) Beth Orton (1997), and Dave Alvin with The Third Mind (2020).

The song also appears in season 6, episode 9 of The Sopranos (The Ride).
