= Lee Underwood =

American musician and journalist (1938–2026)

Lee Underwood (1938 – July 14, 2026) was an American musician and journalist who played lead guitar with Tim Buckley for most of Buckley's career.

== Life and career ==
Underwood appeared on seven of the nine studio albums Buckley recorded during his brief life and on several posthumous albums, including Live in London, Greetings From West Hollywood, and Live at the Troubadour 1969, on each of which he played both piano and guitar. He appeared on the DVD Tim Buckley: My Fleeting House, discussing Buckley's development from folk to jazz to avant-garde.

From 1975 to 1981, Underwood lived in Los Angeles and worked as West Coast editor for DownBeat magazine. He also wrote for Rolling Stone magazine and The Los Angeles Times. In 1990 he quit writing for magazines and moved to Santa Fe, New Mexico. He recorded the album California Sigh as a guitarist and the albums Phantom Light and Gathering Light as a pianist. He wrote the biography Blue Melody: Tim Buckley Remembered and three books of poetry: Timewinds, Diamondfire, and Into Light. He co-wrote Inside Paul Horn: The Spiritual Odyssey and liner notes for Tim Buckley's albums.

Underwood died on July 14, 2026.

== Discography ==
- California Sigh (1988)
- Phantom Light (2003)
- Gathering Light (2009)

With Tim Buckley

- Tim Buckley (Elektra, 1966)
- Goodbye and Hello (Elektra, 1967)
- Happy Sad (Elektra, 1969)
- Blue Afternoon (Straight, 1969)
- Starsailor (Straight, 1970)
- Lorca (Elektra, 1970)
- Sefronia (Discreet, 1973)
