= Goodbye and Hello (Tim Buckley album) =

Studio album by Tim Buckley
- Released: 1967
- Recorded: June 1967
- Studios: Western Recorders & Whitney, Los Angeles
- Genres: Psychedelic folk; psychedelic pop; baroque pop; soft rock
- Length: 42:41
- Label: Elektra
- Producers: Jerry Yester, Jac Holzman

Tim Buckley chronology
Tim Buckley (1966)	Goodbye and Hello (1967)	Happy Sad (1969)

Singles from Goodbye and Hello
- 1. "Morning Glory"; 2. "Once I Was"

Goodbye and Hello is the second album by Tim Buckley, released in 1967. It was recorded in Los Angeles, California, in June of the same year.

The album was re-released in 2001 in a compilation with debut album Tim Buckley by WEA/Elektra. In 2005, a 180-gram version of the LP was released on the label Four Men With Beards and is being distributed by City Hall Records.

== Recording ==
The album was recorded during June 1967 in Los Angeles, and produced by Jerry Yester and Jac Holzman.

== Chart performance ==
The album debuted on Billboard magazine's Top LP's chart in the issue dated November 4, 1967, peaking at No. 171 during a five-week run on the chart.

== Legacy ==
Professional ratings
Review scores
Source	Rating
AllMusic	4.5/5 stars
The Rolling Stone Record Guide	3/5 stars

Matthew Greenwald in a retrospective review for AllMusic felt that it is "an excellent and revolutionary album that was a quantum leap for both Tim Buckley and the audience".

The album was included in the book 1001 Albums You Must Hear Before You Die. In 2000, it was voted number 516 in Colin Larkin's All Time Top 1000 Albums.

== Track listing ==
All songs written by Tim Buckley, except where noted.

Side One

1. "No Man Can Find the War" (Larry Beckett, Buckley) – 2:58
2. "Carnival Song" – 3:10
3. "Pleasant Street" – 5:15
4. "Hallucinations" (Beckett, Buckley) – 4:55
5. "I Never Asked to Be Your Mountain" – 6:02

Side Two

1. "Once I Was" – 3:22
2. "Phantasmagoria in Two" – 3:29
3. "Knight-Errant" (Beckett, Buckley) – 2:00
4. "Goodbye and Hello" (Beckett, Buckley) – 8:38
5. "Morning Glory" (Note: The song "Morning Glory" was covered by Blood, Sweat and Tears on their hit 1968 album Child Is Father to the Man. Buckley's bassist Jim Fielder was a member of BS&T. Larry Beckett's phrase "fleeting house" is prominent in this song.) (Beckett, Buckley) – 2:52

== Personnel ==
- Tim Buckley – six- and 12-string acoustic guitars, vocals, bottleneck guitar, kalimba, vibraphone
- Jerry Yester – piano, organ, harmonium, recording supervisor
- Lee Underwood – lead guitar
- John Farsha & Brian Hartzler – guitars
- Jim Fielder – bass guitar
- Jimmy Bond – double bass
- Don Randi – piano, harmonium, harpsichord
- Henry Diltz – harmonica on "Once I Was"
- Carter C. C. Collins – congas, percussion
- Dave Guard – kalimba, tambourine
- Eddie Hoh & Jim Gordon – drums

Technical

- Jac Holzman – production supervisor
- Bruce Botnick – mixing
- William S. Harvey – cover, design
- David Gates – liner photography
- Guy Webster – photography

== Charts ==
Chart (1967)	Peak position
US Billboard Top LPs	171
