= Larry Beckett =

American poet

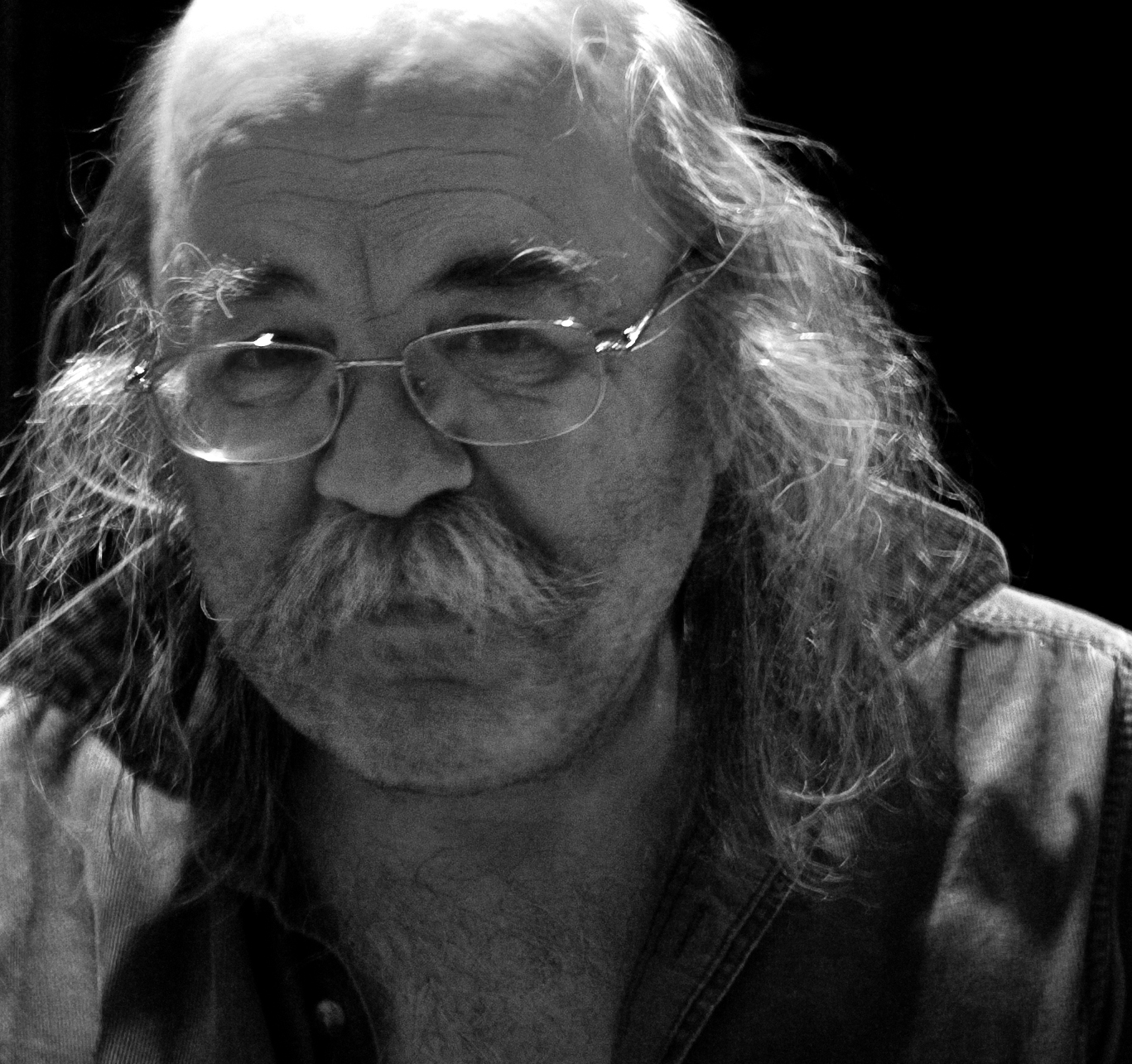
- Beckett in 2012
- Born: April 4, 1947 (age 79); Glendale, California, U.S.
- Occupations: Poet, songwriter, literary critic
- Website: larrybeckettpoet.com

Larry Beckett (born April 4, 1947) is an American poet, playwright, songwriter, musician, translator, and literary critic. As a songwriter and music arranger, Beckett collaborated with Tim Buckley in the late 1960s and early 1970s on several songs and albums, including the critically acclaimed "Song to the Siren" which has been recorded by many artists, from This Mortal Coil to Robert Plant to George Michael to Kitty Macfarlane and Jann Klose. He has also collaborated with British group The Long Lost Band, and local Portland indie band Eyelids.

Beckett has had several books of poetry published including Songs and Sonnets, his selected songs in Song to the Siren, and a few book-length poems entitled Paul Bunyan, Wyatt Earp, and Amelia Earhart. American Cycle, a 47-year project, was published in April 2021 by Running Wild Press.

== Early life ==
Beckett was born in Glendale, California, and lived in Los Angeles, Downey, and Anaheim, where his father was an English and speech teacher and his mother worked in the career counseling industry. The Becketts moved around for the first decade of Larry Beckett's life, first to Ashland, Oregon, then back down south to Downey, California and eventually settling in nearby Anaheim when Larry was 10 years old. Larry Beckett attended Loara High School where he developed a passion for writing and poetry. A high school English teacher helped change his mind from thinking he wanted to be a mathematical physicist, to realizing he was a writer. Also while in high school Larry Beckett befriended classmates Tim Buckley and Jim Fielder, a relationship that would launch Beckett into music songwriting.

== Poetry ==
Beckett read two of his 1966 poems, Found at the Scene of a Rendezvous that Failed, and Birth Day, on the Rhino Handmade reissue of the album Tim Buckley, to which he contributed liner notes, including the lyric “1, 2, 3.” He recited Song to the Siren and an essay on its composition on the MVDvisual DVD Tim Buckley: My Fleeting House.

In December 2021, Beckett was interviewed on a BBC Radio 4 episode of Soul Music, explaining the origins of his poem, "Song to the Siren", and how his collaboration with Buckley evolved as he developed the musical setting for the song. The same episode includes extended readings, by Beckett, along with reflections on the song by various artists who have interpreted it, including musician and singer Dominic Stichbury and singer Rose Betts.

Beckett's lyrics and poems were published in Songs and Sonnets, 2002, by Rainy Day Women Press. His selected song lyrics were published in Song to the Siren, 2024, by Halbaffe Press.

Beat Poetry, with twelve central San Francisco renaissance poems and Beckett’s essays on them reconsidered as literature, was published in 2012. The Jack Kerouac chapter was reprinted in the 2019 anthology Kerouac on Record: A Literary Soundtrack, edited by Simon Warner and Jim Sampas.

For 47 years, Beckett worked on American Cycle, a series of long poems: U. S. Rivers: Highway 1, Old California, Paul Bunyan, John Henry (folklore), Chief Joseph, Wyatt Earp, P. T. Barnum, Amelia Earhart, Blue Ridge, U. S. Rivers: Route 66. The Cycle's themes are love, local mythology, history, justice, memory, accomplishment, time. Paul Bunyan, Wyatt Earp, and Amelia Earhart were published as individual volumes, Paul Bunyan with a recording of a performance. The complete American Cycle was published in 2021.

=== Translations ===
Beckett's translations include The Way of Rain, a reconstruction of the lost order of the Tao Te Ching; Poems After Li Po; Poems After Li Shang-yin; The Wisewoman's Song, from the Poetic Edda; Poems, by Orpheus; The Logos, by Heraclitus; East-West Divan, by Johann Goethe; Heroic Sonnets, by José-Maria de Heredia; Spirits, by Guillaume Apollinaire; Chansons, by Jacques Brel. The Book of Merlin, translations of the poems of Myrddin Wyllt, was published by Livingston Press in 2023, and Romances Without Words / In Solitary, by Paul Verlaine, will be published by the same press in spring 2026.

== Songwriting ==
=== With Tim Buckley ===
Beckett, Buckley, and Fielder frequented Hollywood together where they were introduced to the area's art and music scene. Buckley and Beckett started writing together in the mid-1960s as members of Southern California rock band The Bohemians, with Buckley on rhythm guitar, Brian Hartzel on lead guitar, Beckett on drums, and Jim Fielder (later of Blood, Sweat & Tears) on bass. They recorded a demo for Elektra Records, I Can't See You, but the company was only interested in Buckley as a solo artist, not the group.

Beckett contributed to Buckley's first two albums, Tim Buckley and Goodbye and Hello, both as co-songwriter and as a collaborator on arrangements. The lyrics Beckett wrote, such as "No Man Can Find the War", "Morning Glory" and "Song to the Siren", were characterized by their literary tone. The title track of Goodbye and Hello was originally constructed by Beckett as a piece in which two voices would sing different words and melodies.

Beckett and Buckley resumed their songwriting partnership for Starsailor in 1970, and Beckett was sporadically involved in Buckley's later work until Buckley's death in 1975.

=== Other collaborations ===
In 2014, Beckett began working with a group of musicians from Lancaster, England, The Long Lost Band and record producer Paul Walmsley. He toured with them in the UK in 2015, and contributed poetry and song lyrics to a full-length studio album, One More Mile. The presence of Larry Beckett in the UK was covered in an extensive feature in Record Collector magazine which also covered his relationship with Buckley. Beckett continued his working relationship with Stuart Anthony of The Long Lost Band and Paul Walmsley in 2018, releasing full-length albums One More Mile, Love & Trial, Mirabeau Bridge, and An Afternoon of Poetry & Music.

An admirer of the 5-piece Portland indie band Eyelids, powered by singer-songwriters Chris Slusarenko, from Guided by Voices, and John Moen, of The Decemberists, Beckett began a collaboration with the band by opening his book of songs to them. Beckett also wrote new lyrics. The resulting album, The Accidental Falls, produced by Peter Buck, from R.E.M., made several Best of 2020 lists. The album includes the lost 1966 Beckett/Buckley song "Found at the Scene of a Rendezvous That Failed" with Beckett on piano and Buck on bass.

== Personal life ==
Beckett has remained a poet and songwriter while working as a computer programmer and analyst, based in Portland, Oregon. He is married to photographer Laura Fletcher and they have two children, Susannah Beckett (born 1990) and Quinn Beckett (born 1999), and a grandchild, Kieran Hobbs (born 2023).
