= MacDougal Street =

Street in Manhattan, New York

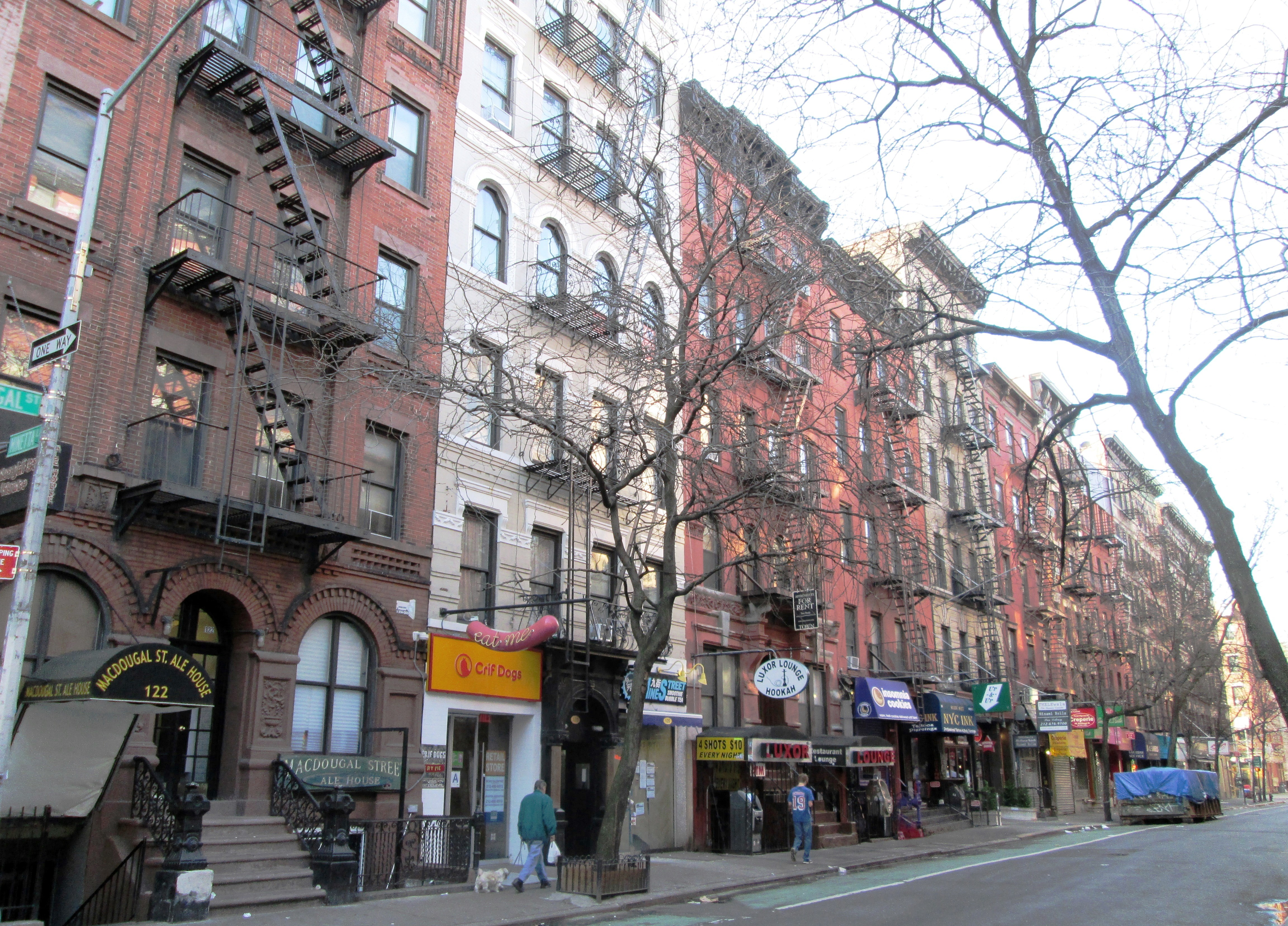
- The east side of MacDougal Street below Minetta Lane (2015)
- Interactive map of MacDougal Street
- Location: Manhattan, New York City, New York, United States
- Coordinates: 40°43′49.866″N 74°0′0.247″W
- North end: West 8th Street
- South end: Prince Street
- East: Sullivan Street
- West: Sixth Avenue

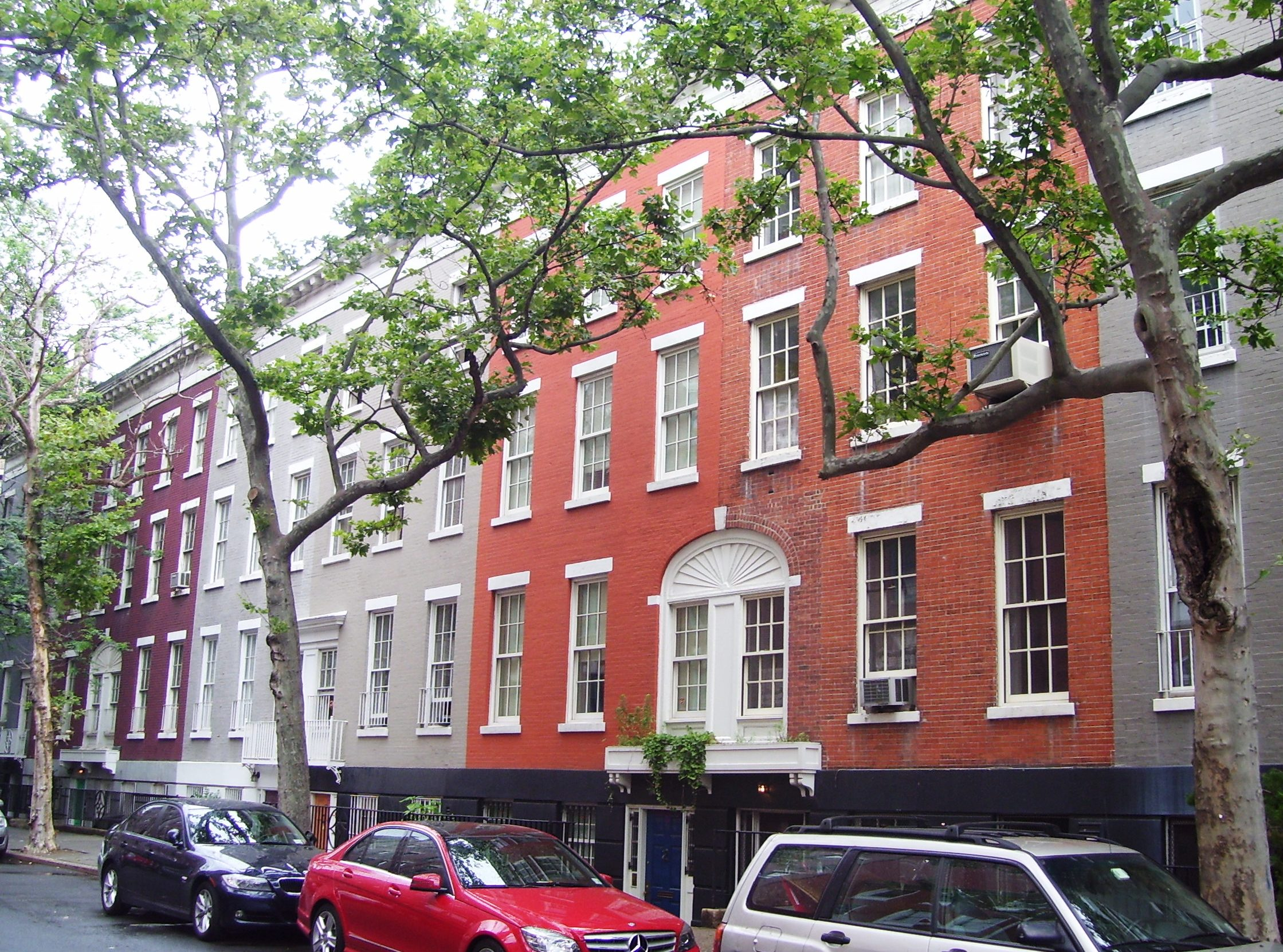
Nos. 82–96, part of the MacDougal–Sullivan Gardens Historic District

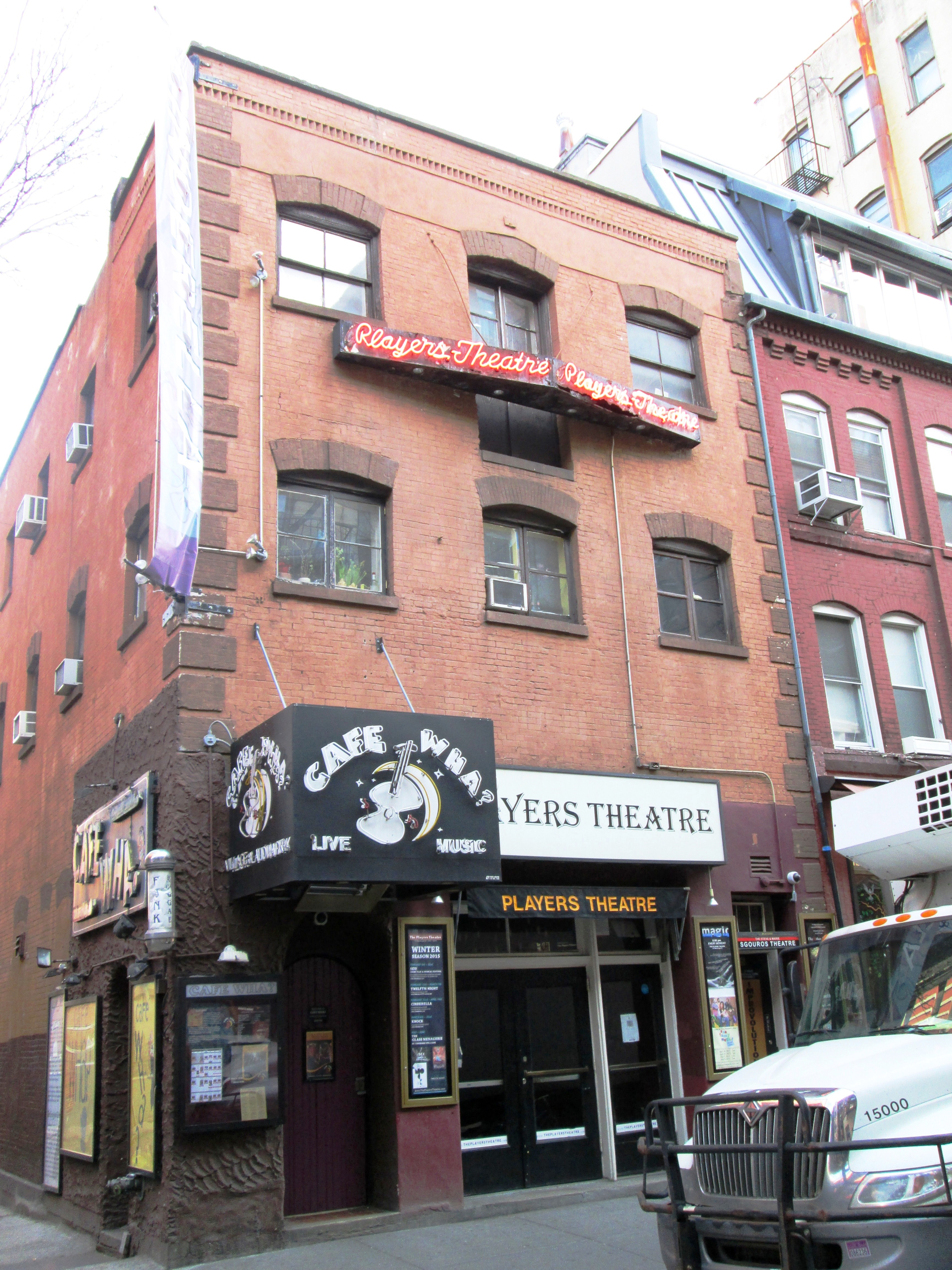
No. 115, The Players Theatre and Cafe Wha? in 2015

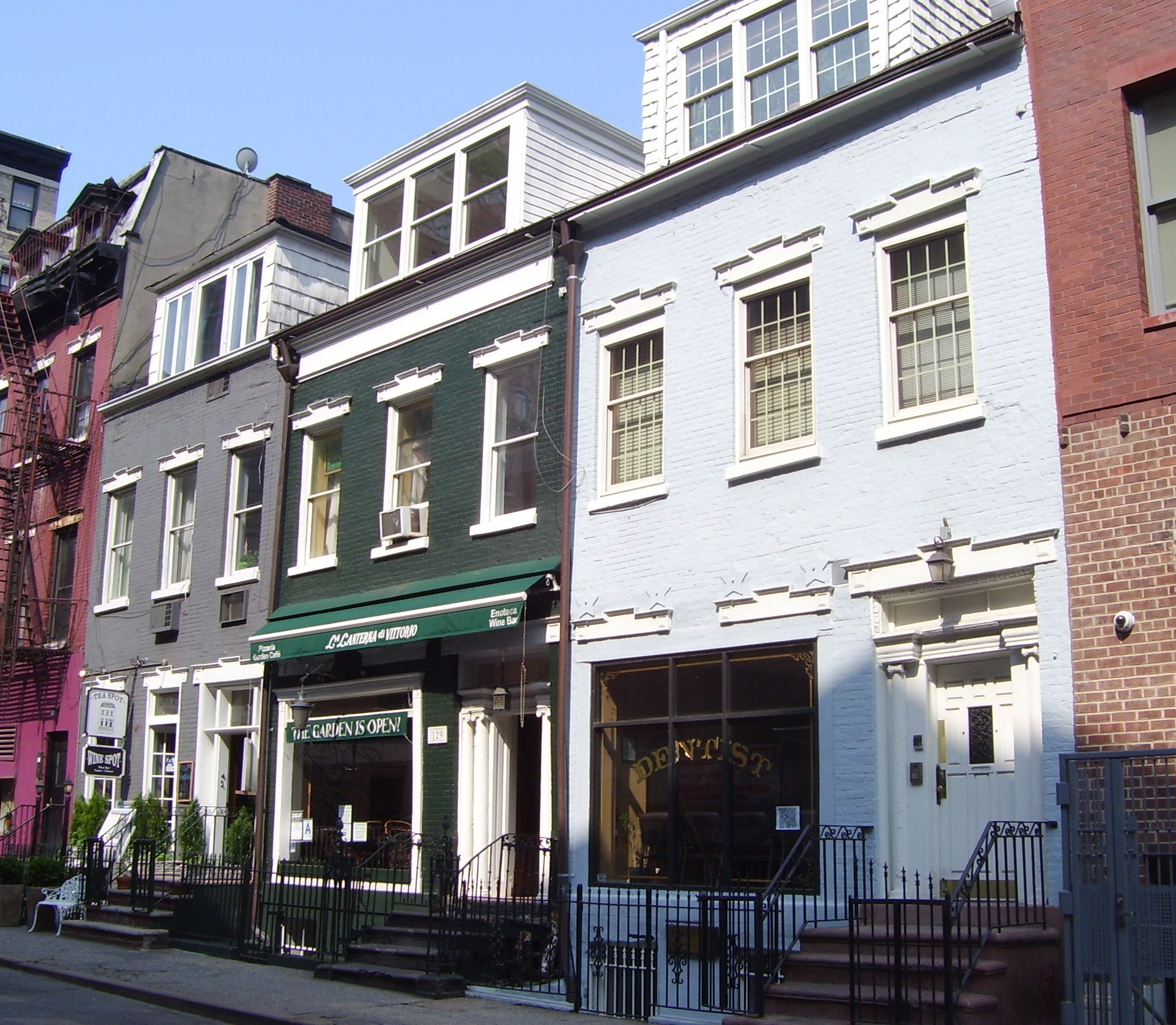
Nos. 127–131 are New York City landmarks

MacDougal Street is a one-way street in the Greenwich Village and SoHo neighborhoods of Manhattan, New York City. The street is bounded on the south by Prince Street and on the north by West 8th Street; its numbering begins in the south. Between Waverly Place and West 3rd Street it carries the name Washington Square West and the numbering scheme changes, running north to south, beginning with #29 Washington Square West at Waverly Place and ending at #37 at West 3rd Street. Traffic on the street runs southbound (downtown).

MacDougal Street is named for Alexander McDougall, a merchant and Revolutionary War military leader. MacDougall is also the namesake of MacDougal Alley, a private cul-de-sac owned jointly by the residents of Washington Square North to its south and West 8th Street to its north, for whom it was created in 1833 for their stables. The alley runs east off MacDougal Street in the block between West 8th Street and Waverly Place/Washington Square North.

MacDougal Street has been called "the most colorful and magnetic venue for tourists on an evening outing in the Village". It has been the subject of many songs, poems, and other forms of artistic expression, and has been frequented by numerous famous individuals.

== Historic locations and residents ==
MacDougal Street

- No. 59 was the location of Avignone Chemists, the oldest apothecary in the United States. Originally named Stock Pharmacy, the name changed when Francis Avignone purchased the pharmacy in 1898. Avignone was recognized as an important small business with the presentation of a Village Award by the Greenwich Village Society for Historic Preservation in 2013.
- Nos. 74–96 between Houston and Bleecker Streets are houses of the MacDougal–Sullivan Gardens Historic District, which were built c. 1844 in the Greek Revival style. However, the houses deteriorated over time until they were bought by William Sloane Coffin in 1920 and thoroughly renovated by Francis Y. Joannes and Maxwell Hyde in Colonial Revival style in 1921; their rear yards were combined with those of the houses behind them on Sullivan Street to make a common garden.
- No. 77 is the clubhouse of the New York Rifle Club (Tiro a Segno).
- Cafe Dante, at No. 81 features a giant photo mural of Florence.
- J.G. Melon satellite restaurant, at No. 89 from 2015 to 2019.
- At the corner of MacDougal and Bleecker Street, at No. 93, is the former site of the San Remo Cafe, which attracted many bohemians such as James Agee, W. H. Auden, James Baldwin, William S. Burroughs, Gregory Corso, Miles Davis, Allen Ginsberg, Frank O'Hara, Jack Kerouac, Jackson Pollock, William Styron, Dylan Thomas, Gore Vidal and many others. The cafe is featured on the cover of Fred Neil's debut folk-rock album Bleecker & MacDougal.
- Bob Dylan bought an apartment in 1969 at No. 94.
- No. 99 was home of 99 Records, a progressive music and fashion store owned by Gina Franklin and Ed Bahlman. 99 Records released 1980's club hits by Liquid Liquid, ESG, and the Bush Tetras, among several others.
- Minetta Tavern at No. 113 is a trattoria/bar which has seen such regulars as E. E. Cummings, Joe Gould, Ernest Hemingway, Eugene O'Neill, Ezra Pound and many others.
- The bar Kettle of Fish opened in 1950 at No. 114, moving in 1986 to the space previously occupied by Gerde's Folk City. A photo by Jerry Yulsman of Jack Kerouac in front of its neon "Bar" sign was used in a black-and-white version and, with Joyce Johnson removed from the image, in an advertisement for the clothing retailer The Gap.
- Bob Dylan had his first New York City gig at the legendary music venue Cafe Wha? at No. 115. This is also where Jimi Hendrix and Bruce Springsteen played some early gigs.
- No. 116 used to be The Gaslight Cafe, where Joan Baez, Ray Bremser, Gregory Corso, Bob Dylan, Lawrence Ferlinghetti, Allen Ginsberg, LeRoi Jones, Jack Kerouac, Dave Van Ronk and many others read poetry and played music. Bob Dylan lived there for a time.
- The Comedy Cellar at No. 117 has featured nearly every notable American comedian.
- Caffe Reggio, at No. 119, a coffeehouse since 1927, has been featured in many movies including The Godfather Part II. Many celebrities have been spotted or photographed in this location. In 1959 presidential hopeful John F. Kennedy made a speech outside the coffee shop.
- No. 127–131 between West 3rd and 4th Streets were built c. 1828–29 as residences in the Federal style. All three had been converted to commercial use by the 1920s, and were designated New York City landmarks in 2004.
- No. 129 is La Lanterna di Vittorio, an Italian pizzeria/cafe with a jazz venue in the basement known as the "Bar Next Door". No. 129 was also in 1925 the address of the lesbian bar "Eve's Hangout" or "Eve Addams's Tearoom", owned by Polish-born and Parisian writer Eva Kotchever, murdered in Auschwitz in 1943. The city of Paris pays tribute to her by naming a street, rue Eva-Kotchever, and a school in the neighbourhood she lived after the closure by police of her bar for "obscenity".
- Louisa May Alcott lived in her uncle's home at Nos. 130–132.
- Fernando Botero lived and painted in the early 1960s on the 2nd floor at No. 134.
- Alice Spivak, a noted acting teacher at HB Studio and private teacher until 2020 lived from 1959 through 1970 on the top floor at No. 134.
- The upstairs of No. 137 was the home of the Liberal Club during the 1910s. Members included such notable intellectuals as: Sherwood Anderson, Theodore Dreiser, Max Eastman, Emma Goldman, Sinclair Lewis, Jack London, Margaret Sanger, Upton Sinclair and Lincoln Steffens.
- No. 146 was once a Caribbean restaurant frequented by James Baldwin, Paul Robeson, Marlon Brando, Eartha Kitt and Henry Miller.
- The Tenth Church of Christ, Scientist, at No. 171 between Washington Square North and East 8th Street was built in 1891 as a factory and store, and was designed by Renwick, Aspinwall and Russell. It was converted into a church in the modern style in 1966–67 by Victor Christ-Janer.
- The corner of West 8th Street and MacDougal, at 32 West 8th Street, is the former location of 8th Street Books, where Bob Dylan and Allen Ginsberg first met.

Other notable residents include Francesco Carrozzini, Francesco Clemente, Diego Della Valle, John Hammond Jr., Baz Luhrmann, Pat Steir. Alexander Calder bought a townhouse in the 1960s for his daughter Mary.

Washington Square

- No. 27 is the former residence of Matthew Broderick , Uta Hagen and Herbert Berghof.
- Eleanor Roosevelt lived at No. 29 after the death of President Franklin D. Roosevelt. The married couple John Sebastian and Jane Bishir, a classical harmonica player and radio actress, respectively, lived at the apartment building at the same time. There, they raised their son, John Sebastian, who later founded the folk-rock band the Lovin' Spoonful.
- Eugene O'Neill lived at the corner of MacDougal and Washington Square South at No. 38 Washington Square.

MacDougal Alley

- Frederick Triebel was the first artist to create a studio in MacDougal Alley; he lived in No. 6.
- Jackson Pollock lived in apartment No. 9 in MacDougal Alley.
- The Czech-American sculptor Albin Polasek rented space at 9 MacDougal Alley from 1914 until 1916.
- The artist James McBey took a photograph of 11 MacDougal Alley in the 1890s.

== In media ==
- In 1954 Jack Kerouac wrote the poem "MacDougal Street Blues".
- American folk singer Dave Van Ronk was nicknamed "The Mayor of MacDougal Street", and a posthumous compilation album and his biography by Elijah Wald were titled after this nickname.
- The song "New York, New York", from the musical On the Town, makes reference to the alley as being "in the heart of Green-Witch Village".
