= Avignone Chemists =

Pharmacy in New York City

Coordinates: 40.729°N 74.002°W

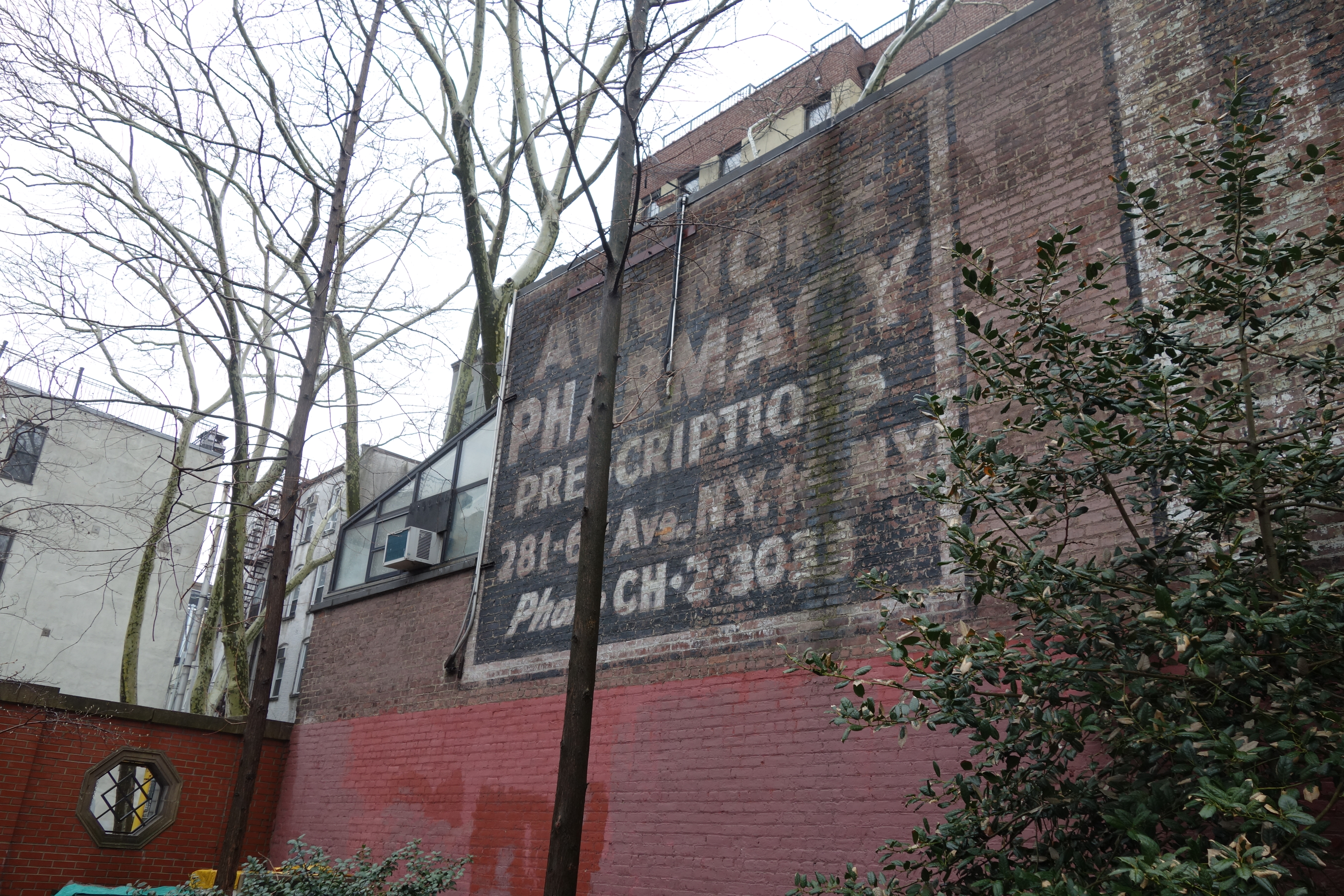
- The side of the former Avignone Pharmacy, looking from Winston Churchill Square.
- Industry: Pharmacy
- Predecessor: Stock Pharmacy
- Founded: 1832
- Headquarters: New York City, New York, United States
- Number of locations: 1
- Owner: Andrew Fruchtman, John Duffy

Avignone Chemists was a full service pharmacy located in the Greenwich Village of Manhattan in New York City, United States. Avignone Chemists was founded in 1832 which made it the country's oldest apothecary. Avignone marketed itself as the Independent Anti-Chain Pharmacy. It closed in 2015.

== History ==
Founded in 1832 as Stock Pharmacy, the original location was at 59 Macdougal Street. Stock Pharmacy was purchased in 1898 by Francis Avignone who proceeded to change the name to Avignone Pharmacy. In 1929, Avignone Pharmacy moved to 281 6th Avenue, its current location, into a two-story building built by the Avignone family. Today, it is known as Avignone Chemists and is owned and operated by Andrew Fruchtman and his business partner John Duffy.

Avignone was recognized as an important small business with the presentation of a Village Award by the Greenwich Village Society for Historic Preservation in 2013.

In April 2015, Avignone Chemists closed down, after the entire block of Bleecker Street between Sixth Avenue and Carmine Street had been bought by a new landlord who tripled the rent for the 1,700-sq. ft. space the business was occupying.
