= Bar Next Door at La Lanterna di Vittorio =

Restaurant in New York City

Coordinates: 40.725656°N 73.991794°W

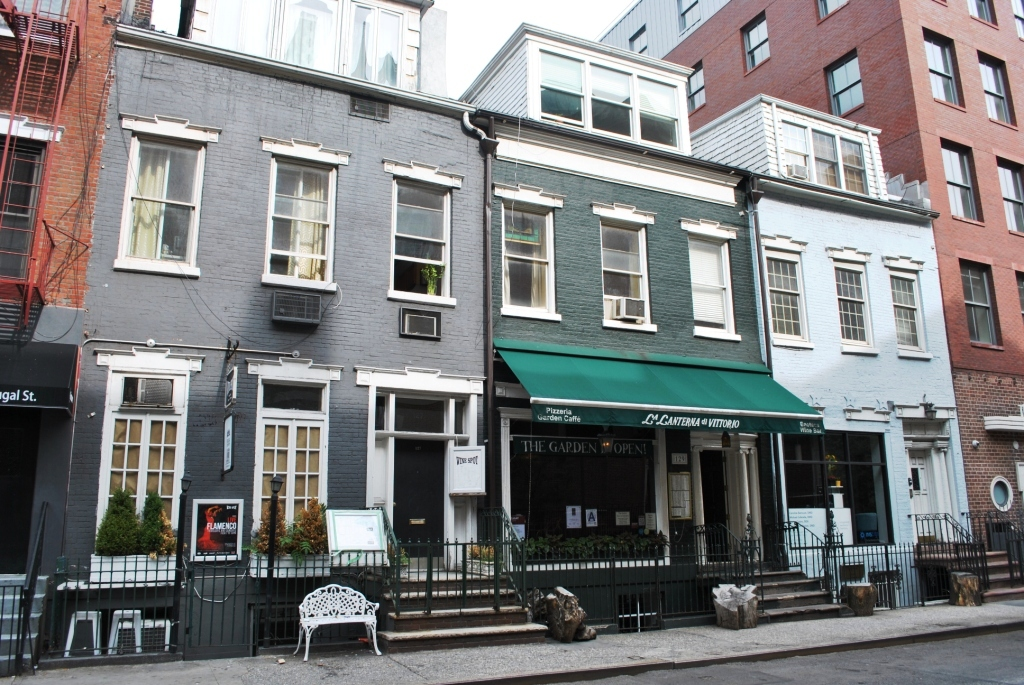
- Interactive map of Bar Next Door at La Lanterna di Vittorio

Restaurant information
- Previous owner: Eva Kotchever
- Location: New York City, New York State
- Website: www.lalanterna.nyc

La Lanterna di Vittorio is a cafe and pizzeria at 129 MacDougal Street, Greenwich Village, New York City. The restaurant is situated in a restored townhouse and serves Italian cuisine. It is noted for its Bar Next Door room in the basement which hosts regular live jazz and rock performances. The basement is characterized by "low ceilings, and exposed brick and romantic lighting". In 2007, Jazz Education Journal referred to it as "One of NYC's great secrets for a first-class jazz experience." The Jonathan Kreisberg Trio are regular performers at the clubs on Wednesdays.

== Trivia ==
- The earliest mention of the Caffè macchiato drink comes from a review of the place in 1988.

== See also ==
- Eve's Hangout by Eva Kotchever
