= The Other Side of This Life =

The Other Side of This Life may refer to:

- "The Other Side of This Life", a song by Fred Neil on his album Bleecker & MacDougal
- "The Other Side of This Life", a Grey's Anatomy season 3 episode
