= The David Lee Roth Show =

American radio show

The David Lee Roth Show was a nationally syndicated American radio show hosted by musician David Lee Roth that aired from January 3 to April 21, 2006. It was the replacement of The Howard Stern Show following its departure from terrestrial to the subscription-based Sirius Satellite Radio. It was simulcast on seven stations owned by CBS Radio, who launched the show as part of its Free FM radio format. Notably different from Howard Stern's program, or corporate "morning zoo" and "shock jock" formats which dominated morning radio at the time, Roth's show sounded similar to pirate radio, featuring ethnic and non-commercial rock music integrated with personal stories, occasionally uncomfortable debates on intellectual matters, and interviews with people Roth admired, such as guitarist Brian May, baseball player Johnny Damon, and Roth's uncle, Manny Roth.

Following its January 2006 debut, a plurality of critics savaged the show, chiding its "amateurishness," while a minority praised Roth's willingness to bring something so obviously "non-corporate" (and ultimately "anti-corporate") to American mainstream radio. Arbitron numbers showed that Roth's radio program initially lost a sizable portion of the Howard Stern audience; however, by the end of his tenure, his show began to find advocates in people disenchanted by Clear Channel-formatted radio. Roth's firing from CBS Radio ended in a lawsuit, which was eventually settled.

== History ==
=== Background ===
In October 2004, Stern announced his departure from terrestrial radio for the subscription-based satellite radio service Sirius Satellite Radio, starting in 2006. Stern had been at WXRK-FM in New York City, the country's number one radio market, since 1985, and moved to morning drive in February 1986. In the same year Stern's show entered national syndication, and aired to peak of 60 stations in the US and Canada. The Super Bowl XXXVIII halftime show controversy spawned a government crackdown on indecency in television and radio by the Federal Communications Commission (FCC), prompting Stern to leave for Sirius, a platform exempt from its regulations.

Shortly after Stern's announcement, his employer and WXRK-FM owner, Infinity Broadcasting, began the search for a replacement. In March 2005, Roth auditioned by hosting the morning show on WZLX-FM, a classic rock station in Boston, for one week. This was followed by a stint on KLSX-FM in Los Angeles. Roth had been an American pop culture icon since the late 1970s, first as the original frontman for Van Halen, and later as a solo artist. In July, news reports speculated that Roth had signed a deal with Infinity, with the prospect of launching the show as early as September, as Stern considered the possibility of leaving terrestrial airwaves three months early. Roth signed a deal worth an $4 million, and was announced as Stern's replacement on October 25 during a surprise appearance on the show. Roth was set to replace Stern in the majority of east coast-based stations, with others replaced by The Adam Carolla Show and Rover's Morning Glory.

Stern's final live terrestrial broadcast aired on December 16, 2005, after which WXRK switched call letters and formats to WFNY and Free FM, a new, mostly talk-based format emphasising the free-to-air service in comparison to the increasingly popular Sirius and XM Satellite Radio services. In addition, Infinity was reorganized as CBS Radio.

=== Launch and run ===
The David Lee Roth Show launched on January 3, 2006, and was simulcast to six other CBS-owned stations: WBCN-FM in Boston, WNCX-FM in Cleveland, KLLI-FM in Dallas, WYSP-FM in Philadelphia, WRKZ-FM in Pittsburgh and WPBZ-FM in West Palm Beach.

On February 27, 2006, less than two months into his stint, Roth took a one week vacation which prompted speculation about his future. Tom Herschel, general manager of his Cleveland affiliate, assured Roth would return and that the break had been planned for weeks, but questioned why Roth needed to take time off. On the same day, the monthly Arbitrend ratings were published which revealed that in January, Roth's first full month on the air, WFNY's morning share among its target audience of 18-to-34-year-olds fell from 13.8% to 1.3%. Audiences also fell sharply in Los Angeles and Chicago.

On March 7, WFNY station manager Tom Chiusano and programming vice president Mark Chernoff held a meeting with Roth to discuss ways for Roth to improve the show. According to Roth, the pair asked him to stop playing "foreign" and "ethnic" soundbeds and appeal to "a 35-year-old white male who likes Lynyrd Skynyrd". Roth spent most of the following live broadcast criticising Chiusano and Chernoff and their suggestions, claiming they wanted him to "copy Stern" which he refused to do, and stressed that he was hired to deliver something "unique". Roth was informed that the addition of a female newscaster was a possibility.

After CBS pulled the show for two days, Roth returned to the air on March 31. The program had noticeable changes, with the 40 rotating music beds and the various sidekicks dropped, leaving just Roth and his board operator Hutch in the studio. Roth said the show was dropped for not following directives and avoiding news and traffic, and for "black fun humour" with his security guard Animal. He said CBS issued him a series of letters forcing the changes, or else face disciplinary action. Rother later said management issued him four letters in five days, and predicted his show could end before May 2006.

=== Cancellation ===
On April 21, around 20 minutes before the show went live, Roth was told that the show was being cancelled after the day's broadcast. On his last show, Roth said: "I was booted, tossed, and it's going to cost somebody", hinting legal action towards CBS for full compensation of his reported $4 million contract. The announcement came shortly before the quarterly Arbitron ratings were published.

On April 24, CBS announced Opie and Anthony as Roth's replacement on all seven affiliates, starting April 26. The New York-based show had been exclusive to XM Satellite Radio since 2004, but the deal granted CBS to pay XM a license fee to carry the program and for XM's advertisements to air on FM. From 6:00–9:00 a.m., the show was compliant with FCC regulations but remained uncensored for XM listeners, after which it was XM exclusive. This marked the show's return to terrestrial radio since August 2002, when Infinity suspended it indefinitely for a segment which allegedly involved a couple having sex in St. Patrick's Cathedral. In 2009, following the introduction of the people meter ratings system and a declining FM radio audience, CBS dropped Opie and Anthony and switched WFNY to a contemporary hits and Top 40 format.

== Criticism ==
Critics and fans alike generally concluded that Roth was unprepared for a radio show, and close to the demise of the show, Roth himself suggested on the air that he agreed with this assessment. He also stated on-air at least once, in response to a caller's complaint, that he thought the show "sucked", although this was in reference to the new format forced upon him by Free-FM management.

Roth said that during the first four weeks on the air, "I was like a fish flopping around at the end of a stick."

Howard Stern stated that the original incarnation of Van Halen is his favorite rock and roll band of all-time, and also that he "like[s] David Lee Roth" on a personal level. Regarding The David Lee Roth Show, Stern stated in a 2010 interview with former CBS executive Rob Barnett that he knew that the show would fail when Roth did not seem to grasp the idea that talking to a radio audience is different from talking to the crowd at a rock concert. "He looked at me with a blank stare," said Stern, "like he wasn't concerned."

In the April 28 edition of the Boston Herald, reporters Gayle Fee and Laura Raposa wrote that some observers speculated that Roth was never intended to successfully replace Howard Stern. Supposedly, CBS Radio wanted to hire Opie and Anthony but did not because Stern openly disliked Opie and Anthony. Reportedly, management at CBS Radio (then called Infinity Broadcasting) believed that whoever replaced Stern was doomed. An insider at CBS Radio was quoted as saying to the Boston Herald reporters that "(he) looked good to Wall Street, and they gave him a real shot. They would have loved for him to succeed, but he wasn't a radio guy."

"Roth's show is ... skin-crawlingly awful. ... In these days of bland Clear Channel/Infinity corporate radio, it's bracing to hear a guy who has no idea what he's doing. ... Listening to Roth, you feel actual physical pain." – Rob Sheffield, Rolling Stone

"He's a mess, and he's a loudmouth punk." – syndicated radio host Don Imus, whose show aired opposite Roth's on sister station WFAN.

"Why anyone ever thought that would work as a radio show is beyond me, it was absolutely unlistenable." -syndicated radio host Tom Leykis.

== Show cast ==
- David Lee Roth – host
- John Hutchinson – board operator (known as "Hutch")
- Brian Young – guitarist (known as "B. Young")

== Guests ==
- Robin Bakay – guest co–host
- Linda Reisman – guest co–host, Dave's EMT instructor
- Lisa Roth – guest co–host, Dave's sister
- Valerie Deore – guest co–host, from Dallas' 105.3 Free FM
- Danni – guest co–host, from 92.3 Free FM's The Booker Show
- Uncle Manny Roth – studio guest, Dave's uncle
- Ludlow Stan – recurring studio guest, record reviews
- Elizabeth Hayt (N.Y. Post Columnist – Love & Hayt) – recurring studio guest
- Animal – Dave's bodyguard
- Matt Sencio – Dave's manager
- Sasha – intern
- Chop – car salesman
- Stacy – the listener who called daily to scream to David on the air that he "sucked"
