= Herb Metoyer =

American singer-songwriter

Herb Metoyer (September 8, 1935 – July 24, 2015) was a Detroit-based singer-songwriter and novelist, best known for his folk music and other work involving New Orleans and Louisiana. He was an early mentor to, and lifelong influence on, Mike Taylor, who performed extensively with John Denver and co-wrote the song "Rocky Mountain High".

== Musical career ==
Metoyer wrote songs for more than 40 years, and was one of the few African Americans to come out of the 1960s folk movement, being prominently associated with Fred Neil and his group of musicians.

It has been said about Metoyer and Neill that "Though the folk movement of the early sixties has always been seen as white and middle class, it included many compelling black folk acts, such as Odetta, Richie Havens, and lesser known names like Herb Metoyer, Josh White Jr, Terry Callier, Major Wiley and many others that were part of Fred Neil's circle of friends and were touched by his music. It is one of the great injustices that these hugely talented artists remain forgotten and under appreciated even today."

He played with Joni Mitchell, Mike Taylor, Josh White, Vince Martin, and many others. His album Something New, recorded in 1965 on MGM's Verve Folkways label received a Four Star rating by Billboard magazine. His song "Mother, Fools are a Long Time Coming" was recorded on Neil's Sessions album, a copy of which was placed by astronauts in a time capsule on the Moon.

== Novelist ==
Metoyer published two novels and published over twenty books for other authors. His last novel, Small Fires in the Sun, chronicles the struggles of three cultures trying to coexist in colonial Louisiana – the French, the Spanish, and the African slaves. In 1984, he became a founding member of the Detroit Black Writers' Guild.

== Personal life ==
Metoyer considered himself a "Louisiana Creole gentleman" with deep roots in Louisiana. Born Herbert R. Metoyer Jr. in Oakdale, Louisiana, he graduated at age 19 from Southern University in Baton Rouge. He was a U.S. Army helicopter pilot during the Vietnam War, rising to the rank of Major. At the time of his death, of pulmonary fibrosis, he resided in Southfield, Michigan.
