= Caffe Reggio =

Coffeehouse in New York City

Coordinates: 40.730287°N 74.000328°W

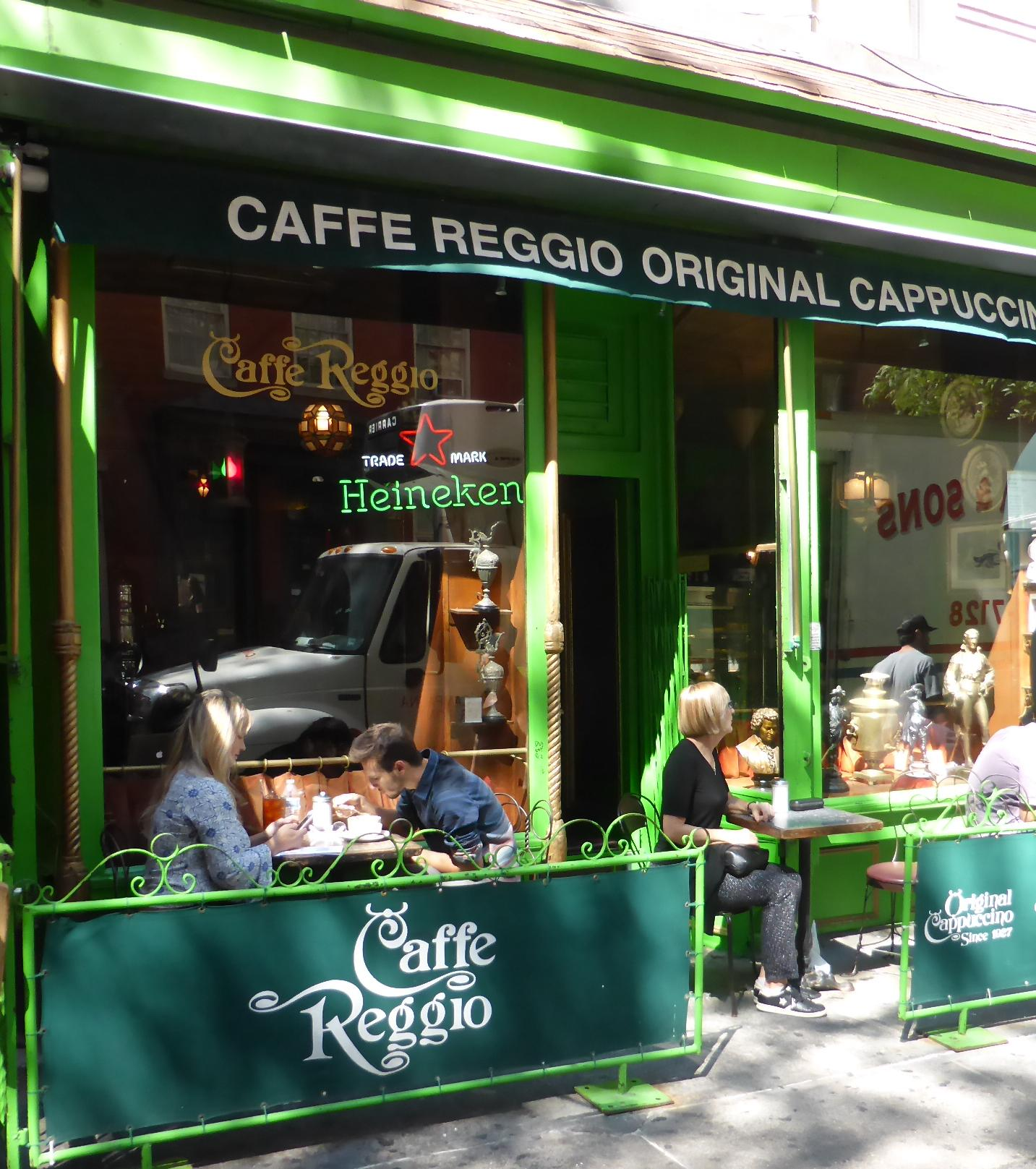
Caffe Reggio, September 2015

Caffe Reggio is a New York City coffeehouse at 119 Macdougal Street in the heart of Manhattan's Greenwich Village which first opened in 1927.

Italian cappuccino was introduced in America by the founder of Caffe Reggio, Domenico Parisi, in the early 1920s. Inside the cafe, against the back wall, is the original espresso machine, made in 1902, which Domenico Parisi purchased when he opened the cafe in 1927. This cafe was also one of the first American cafes to sell a cappuccino.

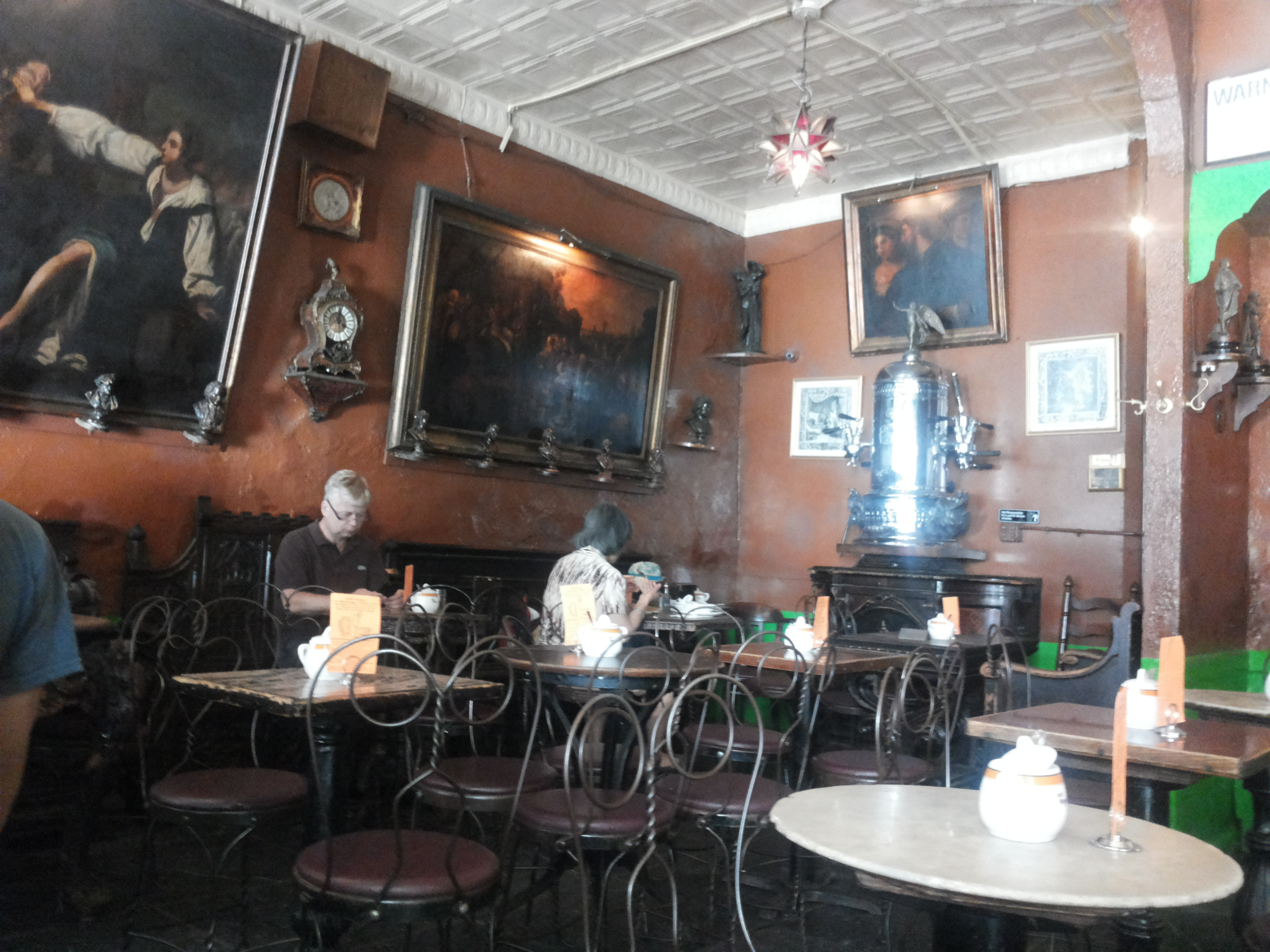
Interior, 2015

Caffe Reggio has been featured in many movies, including The Godfather Part II, Next Stop, Greenwich Village, The Kremlin Letter, Shaft, Serpico, The Next Man, In Good Company, Inside Llewyn Davis, The Sun Is Also a Star and others. Caffe Reggio is mentioned in the Luke Cage season 2 episode "They Reminisce Over You". Many celebrities have been spotted or photographed in this location. In 1959, presidential hopeful John F. Kennedy made a speech outside the coffee shop. In 2010, the cafe was honored with a Village Award by the Greenwich Village Society for Historic Preservation for its status as a beloved and essential part of the neighborhood.

Caffe Reggio has a bench from a palazzo of the Florentine Medici family of Renaissance fame. The bench is not roped off and guests can sit on it and admire a painting from an artist of the school of Caravaggio.
