= Rue Eva Kotchever =

Street in Paris, France

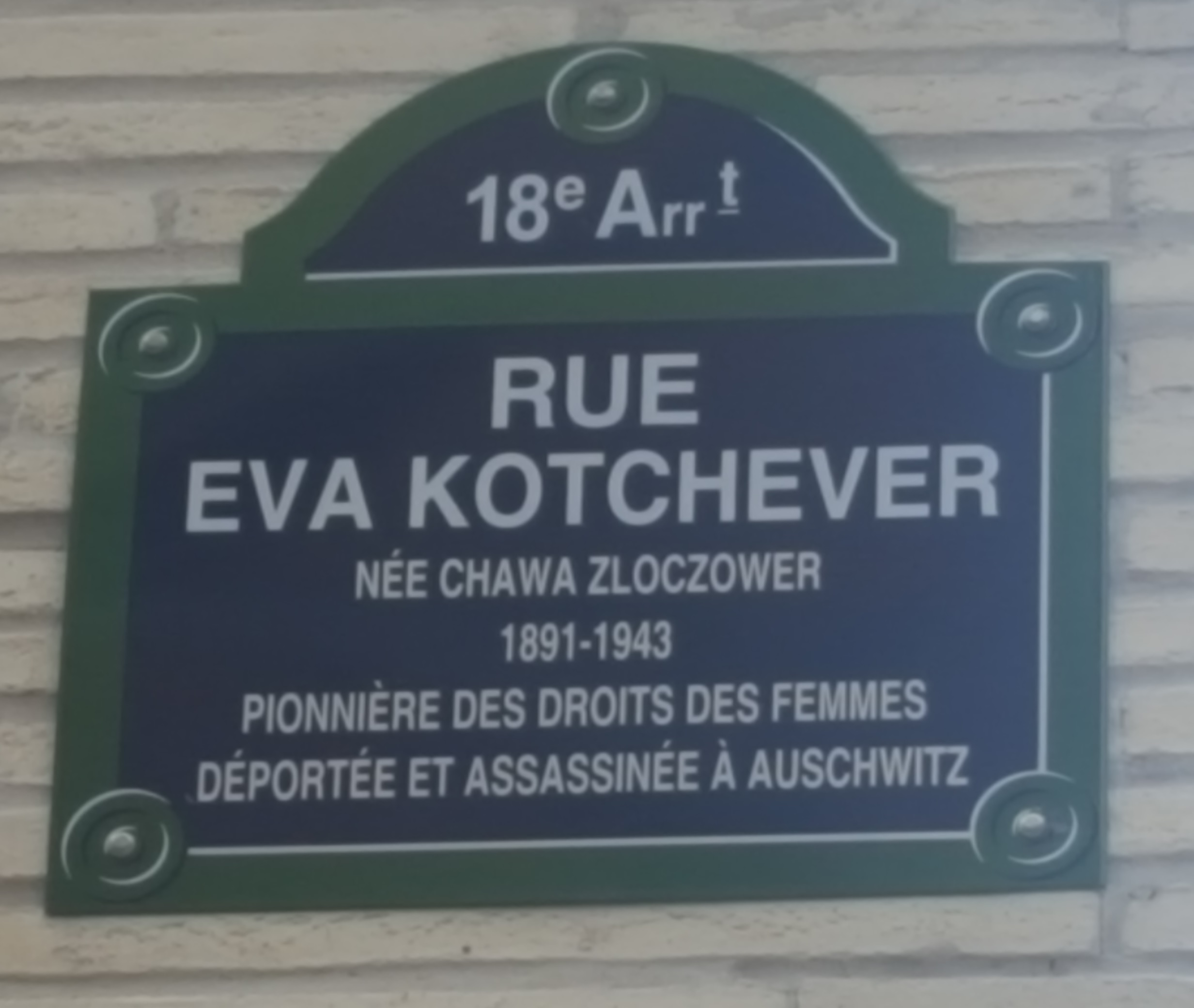
- Parisian street sign

- Location within Paris
- Arrondissement: 18th
- Quarter: Chapelle
- Coordinates: 48°53′51″N 2°21′29″E
- From: Rue Pierre Mauroy
- To: Rue des Cheminots

Construction
- Completed: 2019

The Rue Eva Kotchever is a street in the 18th arrondissement of Paris, France.

== History ==
It was named after Polish activist Eva Kotchever, owner of the Eve's Hangout in New York, murdered at Auschwitz in 1943.

The kindergarten and the public school of the district are also officially named after her.

== Access ==
Porte de la Chapelle (Paris Métro) is nearby.

== Places of interests ==
- Montmartre
- Rue Pierre Mauroy, in memory of Pierre Mauroy, former Prime Minister of France under President François Mitterrand.
- Allée Lydia-Becker, named after the British activist Lydia Becker.
