= Everybody's Talkin' =

1968 single by Fred Neil

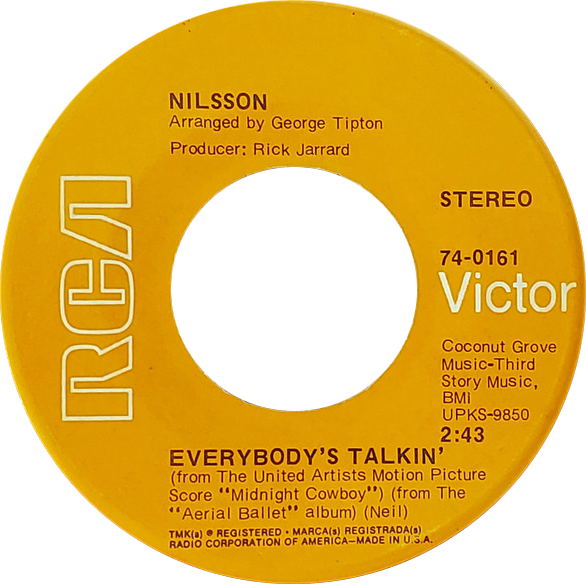
- 1969 US single re-release

Single by Nilsson

from the album Aerial Ballet
- B-side: "Don't Leave Me"
- Released: July 1968
- Recorded: November 13, 1967
- Studio: RCA (Hollywood, California)
- Genre: Folk rock; soft rock; country folk; folk-pop
- Length: 2:43
- Label: RCA Victor
- Songwriter: Fred Neil
- Producer: Rick Jarrard

Nilsson singles chronology
"One" (1968)	"Everybody's Talkin'" (1968)	"I Will Take You There" (1968)

"Everybody's Talkin'" is a song written and recorded by the American singer-songwriter Fred Neil in 1966. A version of the song performed by the American singer-songwriter Harry Nilsson became a hit in 1969, reaching No. 6 on the US Billboard Hot 100 chart and winning a Grammy Award after it was featured in the film Midnight Cowboy. The song, which describes the singer's desire to retreat from the harshness of the city to a more peaceful place and an easier life, is among the most famous works of both artists, and has been covered by many other notable performers.

== Background ==
The song was first released on Neil's second album, the eponymous Fred Neil, released in late 1966. It was allegedly composed towards the end of the session, after Neil had become anxious to wrap the album so he could return to his home in Miami, Florida. Manager Herb Cohen claimed that he promised that if Neil wrote and recorded a final track, he could go. "Everybody's Talkin'", recorded in one take, was the result. However, contrary to this claim, "Everybody's Talkin'" was copyrighted April 20, 1966, the same day as Neil's "The Dolphins," nearly six months before Fred went into the Capitol studios to record it on October 13, 1966. As reported in the only Fred Neil biography, "That's The Bag I'm In: The Life, Music and Mystery of Fred Neil," Peter Childs—Fred's friend and accompanist—who played on the recording, said, "I don't remember Fred being whisked off to the airport after the recording of that song," said Peter Childs. "It was by no means the last song. Herb's version can hardly be accurate in that respect."

Toby Creswell writing in 1001 Songs notes that the song had parallels to Neil's later life—like the hero of Midnight Cowboy, he looked "for fame to match his talents, discover[ed] that success in his profession isn't all its cracked up to be" and wanted to retreat. Five years later, Neil permanently fulfilled the promise of the speaker in the song, rejecting fame to live the rest of his life in relative obscurity "where the sun keeps shining / thru' the pouring rain" in his home in Coconut Grove, Miami.

== Harry Nilsson version ==
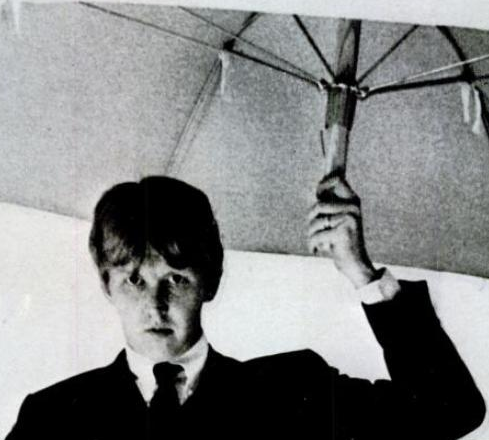
Nilsson in 1967 promotional photo

Harry Nilsson was searching for a successful song when Rick Jarrard played the track for him, and he decided to record it on November 13, 1967. It was eventually released on his 1968 album Aerial Ballet. When originally released as a single in July 1968, it managed to reach only No. 13 on the Billboard Bubbling Under the Hot 100 chart.

As director John Schlesinger was working on the 1969 film Midnight Cowboy, Derek Taylor recommended Nilsson for the soundtrack to Schlesinger. While Nilsson wrote a new song intended for the film's soundtrack ("I Guess the Lord Must Be in New York City"), Schlesinger instead preferred "Everybody's Talkin'", and used it as the film's theme song. Nilsson re-recorded the song with a slightly different arrangement from the Aerial Ballet version, to better adapt to the music lengths required for various sequences in the film.

Following the success of Midnight Cowboy in theaters, RCA re-released the Aerial Ballet version as a single, with this re-release becoming a hit, peaking at No. 6 on the Billboard Hot 100 chart and No. 2 on the Billboard Easy Listening chart. The song and movie have since become closely associated with one another; Nilsson's cover is also known as "Everybody's Talkin' (Theme from Midnight Cowboy)". William J. Mann, in his biography of Schlesinger, noted that "one cannot imagine Midnight Cowboy now without 'Everybody's Talkin'".

=== Personnel ===
According to the AFM contract sheet, the following musicians played on the track.

- Harry Nilsson – vocals
- Al Casey – acoustic guitars
- Mike Melvoin – piano
- Larry Knechtel – bass guitar
- Jim Gordon – drums
- Alfred Lustgarten – violin
- Jerome Reisler – violin
- Wilbert Nuttycombe – violin
- Leonard Atkins – violin
- Darrel Terwilliger – violin
- Arnold Belnick – violin

In addition, not on the AFM contract sheet, playing the banjo on the track is Randy Cierley Sterling.

== Theme and style ==
Described in The Rock Snob*s Dictionary as an "anti-urban plaint", "Everybody's Talkin'" depicts the introverted speaker's inability to connect with others. Not hearing or truly seeing them, the speaker declares an intention to leave for the ocean and the summer breeze. AllMusic's Denise Sullivan describes Neil's version as "positively spooky and Spartan" by comparison to Nilsson's better-known cover, whose arrangement she felt captured the "freedom, shrouded in regret and loss, implied in the lyric".

The line "Going where the weather suits my clothes" is paraphrased from "Going Down the Road Feeling Bad", a traditional American folk song.

== Reception and legacy ==
Nilsson's single for the song sold over a million copies and charted on both Billboard's Adult Contemporary and Pop Singles charts, reaching numbers 2 and 6 respectively in 1969. Nilsson's single also won a Grammy that year. The song became a global success and was followed by international appearances by Nilsson to perform it.

Nilsson denied that the song made him successful. Creswell, writing in 1001 Songs, claims that the hit "made Nilsson a superstar," exposing him to a much broader fan base and altering his reputation from solely that of a songwriter to a singer. After Nilsson's death, Billboard noted that Nilsson remained popularly remembered for his covers of "Everybody's Talkin'" and "Without You". Neil, too, is largely remembered for this song. But although Neil's second album was re-released in 1969 under the title Everybody's Talkin' to capitalize on the success of the song, Neil himself shunned the limelight, retiring from the industry after his final album in 1971 to live quietly in the Florida Keys with the millions of dollars he is estimated to have earned on royalties from the song. In keeping with the song's position in the works of both artists, it has been used to title several "greatest hits" compilation albums—a 1997 release by BMG, a 2001 release by Armoury and a 2006 release by RCA for Nilsson and a 2005 release for Neil by Raven Records entitled Echoes of My Mind: The Best of 1963–1971.

The song is highly regarded in the industry, having become a standard. Songwriter Jerry Leiber described it as "a very strange and beautiful song", among the "truly beautiful melodically and lyrically" songs by Fred Neil, who was described by Rolling Stone as "[r]eclusive, mysterious and extravagantly gifted". A 2006 article in The New York Times characterizes the song as "a landmark of the classic-rock era." The song's popularity has proven persistent; through 2005, according to figures from Broadcast Music Incorporated reported in The New York Times, the song had aired on radio and television 6.7 million times. In 2004, the song was listed by the American Film Institute as No. 22 in its "top 100 movie songs" for the first 100 years of film.

In 1999, the 1969 recording of "Everybody's Talkin'" by Harry Nilsson on RCA Victor Records was inducted into the Grammy Hall of Fame.

== Other cover versions ==
Since Nilsson's recording achieved chart success, the song has been covered by many other artists—almost 100 as of 2006. The more notable versions include ones by Stevie Wonder, Willie Nelson, Neil Diamond, Glen Campbell, Liza Minnelli, Tony Bennett, Luna, Bill Withers, Madeleine Peyroux, Louis Armstrong, Leonard Nimoy, Iggy Pop, Julio Iglesias, Lena Horne, Harold Melvin and the Blue Notes, The Beautiful South, Jimmy Buffett, Bobby Goldsboro, Weyes Blood and Crosby, Stills & Nash.

== Charts ==
=== Weekly charts ===
Fred Neil version

Chart (1968)	Peak position
US Billboard Bubbling Under the Hot 100	113
US Cash Box Top 100	54
US Record World Singles Chart	51

Nilsson version

Chart (1969–1970)	Peak position
Australia (Go-Set)	18
Canadian RPM Top Singles	1
Canadian RPM Adult Contemporary	1
Netherlands (Dutch Top 40)	34
New Zealand (Listener)	12
South Africa (Springbok)	11
Swedish Singles Chart	9
UK Singles Chart	23
US Billboard Hot 100	6
US Billboard Adult Contemporary	2
US Cash Box Top 100	7
US Record World Singles Chart	7

The Beautiful South version

Chart (1994)	Peak position
Europe (Eurochart Hot 100)	39
Europe (European Hit Radio)	21
Iceland (Íslenski Listinn Topp 40)	8
Ireland (IRMA)	23
Scottish Singles Sales (Official Charts)	15
UK Singles (Official Charts)	12

=== Year-end charts ===
Nilsson version

Chart (1969)	Position
Canadian RPM Top Singles	27
US Billboard Hot 100	73

The Beautiful South version

Chart (1994)	Position
UK Singles (OCC)	114
UK Airplay (Music Week)	19

== Certifications ==
Region	Certification	Certified units/sales
United Kingdom (BPI) Nilsson version	Gold	400,000^{‡}
United Kingdom (BPI) The Beautiful South version	Silver	200,000^{‡}
^{‡} Sales+streaming figures based on certification alone.
