= Bleecker & MacDougal =

Studio album by Fred Neil
- Released: May 1965
- Recorded: Early 1965
- Studio: Elektra, New York City
- Genre: Folk rock; folk
- Length: 34:09
- Label: Elektra
- Producer: Gordon Anderson

Fred Neil chronology
Tear Down the Walls (1964)	Bleecker & MacDougal (1965)	Fred Neil (1966)

Professional ratings
Review scores
Source	Rating
AllMusic	4.5/5 stars

Bleecker & MacDougal is the debut solo studio album by the American folk musician Fred Neil. Recorded in early 1965 at Elektra Records' Midtown Manhattan recording studios, the album was released in May 1965. The recording, which unlike many folk albums at the time featured electric guitar backing, had an influence on the folk rock movement.

Guest musicians included Felix Pappalardi on bass, a young John Sebastian playing harmonica, and Pete Childs on dobro and electric guitar.

Except for two tracks, all of the songs on the album were written by Neil. Bleecker & MacDougal was reissued as Little Bit of Rain in 1970.

The album is named for the intersection of Bleecker Street and MacDougal Street in the Greenwich Village neighborhood of New York City. A picture of the intersection featured on the album cover. The San Remo Cafe can be seen in the picture, a gathering spot for writers and musicians for decades. Both streets were locales for folk and rock music of the period.

== Track listing ==
All songs are written by Fred Neil, except where noted.

Side one

1. "Bleecker & MacDougal" – 2:14
2. "Blues on the Ceiling" – 2:24
3. "Sweet Mama" – 2:35
4. "Little Bit of Rain" – 2:23
5. "Country Boy" – 2:27
6. "Other Side to This Life" – 2:56
7. "Mississippi Train" – 2:14

Side two

1. "Travelin' Shoes" – 2:18
2. "The Water is Wide" (Traditional) – 4:18
3. "Yonder Comes the Blues" – 1:52
4. "Candy Man" (Neil, Beverly "Ruby" Ross) – 2:29
5. "Handful of Gimme" – 2:15
6. "Gone Again" – 3:13

== Personnel ==
According to Richie Unterberger:

Musicians

- Fred Neil – guitar, vocals
- Pete Childs – guitar, resonator guitar
- Douglas Hatlelid – bass guitar
- Felix Pappalardi – bass guitar
- John Sebastian – harmonica

Production and additional personnel

- Gordon Anderson – producer
- William S. Harvey – artwork
- Jac Holzman – production supervision
- Paul Rothchild – recording engineer
- Mort Schuman – photography
- Skip Weshner – liner notes

== Sources ==
- Neff, Peter Lee (2019). That's the Bag I'm In: The Life, Music and Mystery of Fred Neil. Nashville: Blue Ceiling Publishing. ISBN 978-1-7330164-0-7.
