= Fred Neil (album) =

Studio album by Fred Neil
- Released: December 1966
- Genre: Folk rock
- Length: 37:56
- Label: Capitol
- Producer: Nick Venet

Fred Neil chronology
Bleecker & MacDougal (1965)	Fred Neil (1966)	Sessions (1968)

Singles from Fred Neil
- 1. "The Dolphins" / "I've Got a Secret (Didn't We Shake Sugaree)" Released: January 1967

Professional ratings
Review scores
Source	Rating
Allmusic	4.5/5 stars

Fred Neil is the second album from Fred Neil, a pioneer folk rock musician, recorded and released in 1966. The album has a more laid-back sound than his debut, and contains his best-known songs; "Everybody's Talkin'" and "The Dolphins". It was re-released in 1969 under the title Everybody's Talkin' in response to the international success of the soundtrack of the movie Midnight Cowboy, which made a hit of the new title track for Harry Nilsson. Music journalist Richie Unterberger characterizes the album as Neil's best, and it was listed in the first (2005) edition of the book 1001 Albums You Must Hear Before You Die, edited by Robert Dimery.

== Track listing ==
All tracks composed by Fred Neil, except where noted.

Side one

1. "The Dolphins" – 3:51
2. "I've Got a Secret (Didn't We Shake Sugaree)" (Elizabeth Cotten) – 4:35
3. "That's the Bag I'm In" – 3:33
4. "Badi-Da" – 3:35
5. "Faretheewell (Fred's Tune)" (Traditional) – 4:00

Side two

1. "Everybody's Talkin'" – 2:58
2. "Everything Happens" – 2:17
3. "Sweet Cocaine" (Traditional) – 2:05
4. "Green Rocky Road" (Len Chandler and Bob Kaufman) – 3:35
5. "Cynicrustpetefredjohn Raga" – 7:27

== Personnel ==
- Fred Neil – acoustic guitar, electric, mumbles, vocals, finger snapping
- Pete Childs – electric guitar, acoustic guitar
- John T. Forsha – acoustic guitar, 12-string guitar
- Cyrus Faryar – acoustic guitar, bouzouki
- Rusty Faryar – finger cymbals
- Jimmy Bond – bass
- Billy Mundi – drums, cymbals, tambourine
- Alan Wilson – harmonica
- Nick Venet – sound effects

== Production ==
- Producer – Nick Venet
- Production coordination – Norma Sharp
- Recording engineer – Peter Abbott, John Kraus
- Art direction – Nick Venet
- Photography – Jim Marshall, Edward Simpson
- Liner notes – Jerry Hopkins, Bob Mehr, Fred Neil
