= Mikołaj Sobczak =

- Born: 1989 (age 36–37); Poznań, Poland
- Education: Academy of Fine Arts, Warsaw, Berlin University of the Arts, Kunstakademie Münster
- Known for: Painting, video art, performance art

Mikołaj Sobczak (born 1989) is a Polish artist. His artwork mixes painting, video, and performance art. In addition to portraying alternate historical visions, Sobczak's artwork combines daily life with surreal collaged visual narratives in which he incorporates characters from countercultural emancipatory movements and LGBTQIA+ activism. Sobczak lives and works in Düsseldorf, Germany.

== Career ==
Sobczak graduated from the Academy of Fine Arts in Warsaw in the Studio of Spatial Activities, later obtained a scholarship at Berlin University of the Arts, and studied as well at Kunstakademie Münster. Sobczak's work have been in public collections such as Moderna Museet (Stockholm), Kunstsammlung Nordrhein-Westfalen (Düsseldorf), Ludwig Forum (Aachen), and The Perimeter (London).

=== Residences ===
- 2022 Rijksakademie van Beeldende Kunsten, Amsterdam, the Netherlands
- 2023 Art Explora, Paris, France

== Work ==
For his contemporary concerns regarding queerness in an era of political radicalization, Sobczak draws on avant-garde ideas of Polish postwar theater, such as that of Tadeusz Kantor. Sobczak also frequently collaborates with Nicholas Grafia, a Filipino-born German artist. Sobczak's works often focus on topics such as emancipation, freedom, and marginalization, which he tackles through fictional narratives and mythic creatures, revealing the larger political problem on a worldwide scale. He predominantly examines the representation of historical events and raises questions regarding the formation of identities and cultures amidst the canonization of history by threading in fictional narratives such as sagas and myths. He also drew inspiration from the life of Polish writer Eva Kotchever, who was murdered at Auschwitz concentration camp during the Second World War.

== Select exhibitions ==
=== Solo exhibitions ===
- 2018 The Doomed Ones, in the frames of The Department of Presence, Museum of Modern Art, Warsaw, Poland
- 2021 Metamorphoses, Polana Institute, Warsaw, Poland
- 2022 Leibeigene, Kunsthalle Münster, Germany
- 2023 Heretics Forever, Galerie Max Mayer, Düsseldorf, Germany
- 2024 Impossible Songs, Jester, Genk, Belgium
- 2026 Teilen und Herrschen, Polnisches Institut Düsseldorf
- 2024 Le Boudoir de l'Amour, Capitain Petzel, Berlin, Germany
- 2024 Impossible Songs, Jester, Flanders Arts Institute, Genk, Belgium
- 2026 Teilen und Herrschen, Polnisches Institut Düsseldorf

=== Group exhibitions ===
- 2015 Squeez me, Satellite Space, Santa Monica, CA
- 2016 Wie traurig war das Shooting, Kunstverein Gelsenkirchen, Germany
- 2017 Akademie [Arbeitstitel], Kunsthalle Düsseldorf, Germany
- 2018 Artists' Film International, Whitechapel Gallery, London, United Kingdom
- 2019 New Kingdom, Polana Institute, Warsaw, Poland
- 2020 Warsaw Under Construction: Something Common, Museum of Modern Art, Warsaw, Poland
- 2021 lliberal Arts. Institutions, Humiliation, Rituals, Perceptibilities, Haus der Kulturen der Welt, Berlin, Germany
- 2022 Weak.End.Opera, Shedhalle, Zurich, Switzerland
- 2023 Illiberal Lives, Ludwig Forum, Aachen, Germany
- 2024 Lines, Lives and Lies, On The Inside, Amsterdam, Netherlands
