= Café El Jarocho =

Coffee shop in Mexico City

Coordinates: 19°21′4.28″N 99°9′42.43″W

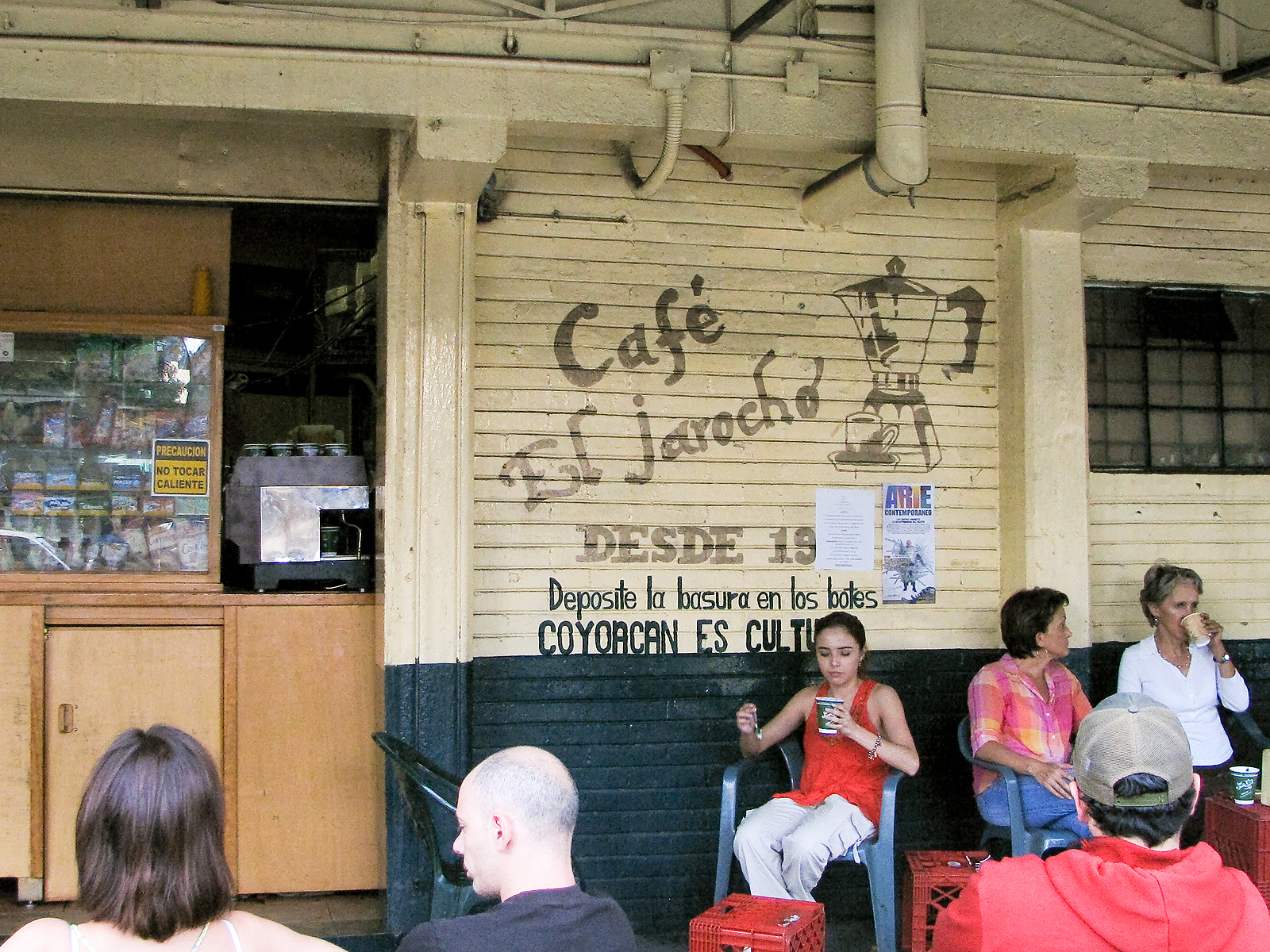
Café El Jarocho in Coyoacán

Café El Jarocho is a coffee shop created in 1953 in Coyoacán a borough of Mexico City. Today it has nine branches distributed Mexico City which are currently administered by the children of the founders.

== History ==
Gil Romero and Bertha Paredes were a married couple who had a grocery in Aguayo Street in the borough of Coyoacán. They offered basic products such as fruits, vegetables and bulk coffee from Veracruz. Gil used to give coffee served in ceramic cups to their neighbors. Later, he decided it would be a good idea to sell the coffee. The couple and their children moved a few blocks away from the grocery and started the business.

In 1953, the first coffee shop called El Jarocho opened in Coyoacán, between Cuauhtémoc and Allende Streets. Bertha was in charge of the business and Gil was in charge of planting coffee in the northern mountains of Veracruz. Black coffee and coffee with milk were prepared home-style because they did not have an electric coffee maker. Because of the demand for coffee from the neighbors they decided to buy an industrial coffee maker and started to offer more specific drinks such as cappuccino and American style. The menu increased and offered not only drinks but a variety of sweet bread and sandwiches made with Bertha's recipes.

== Locations ==
In 1970, the business was established as coffee bar service in a small place with 4 tables. By the year 1980, it was decided that the crockery used to serve the coffees was impractical and opted to replace it with disposable cups and started the new trend of what is known today as coffee bar.

In the early 1990s, the first branch opened giving rise to open another 6 more branches during that decade. Two more branches opened after the year 2000, where the family business is consolidated.

In late 2010, the ninth coffee shop opened with not only tables and chairs but with a bonus. With restrooms, parking, lift for persons with disabilities such as toilet for them and Wi-Fi.

== Coyoacan branch ==
The favorite, traditional and most popular branch is the original in Coyoacán, the first coffee shop El Jarocho. With no chairs or tables but with a long queue of customers. People enjoy their drink standing in the street or sitting on curbside benches. The Coyoacan branch has also become a tourist spot.
