= Fred Neil =

American singer-songwriter (1936–2001)

- Neil c. 1964

Background information
- Born: Frederick Ralph Morlock Jr. March 16, 1936; Cleveland, Ohio, U.S.
- Died: July 7, 2001 (aged 65) Summerland Key, Florida, U.S.
- Genres: Blues; folk
- Occupations: Singer; songwriter
- Instruments: Vocals; guitar; whistling
- Years active: 1958–1975

Fred Neil (born Frederick Ralph Morlock Jr.; March 16, 1936 – July 7, 2001) was an American folk singer-songwriter active in the 1960s and early 1970s. He is mainly known through other people's recordings of his material, particularly "Everybody's Talkin'", which became a hit for Harry Nilsson after it was used in the film Midnight Cowboy in 1969. Though highly regarded by contemporary folk singers, he was reluctant to tour and spent much of the last 30 years of his life assisting with the preservation of dolphins.

== Life and career ==
Fred Neil was born Frederick Ralph Morlock Jr., in Cleveland, Ohio, two weeks after the marriage of his parents, Frederick Ralph Morlock and Lura Camp Riggs. Neil later said that he took his stage name from his maternal grandmother, Addie Neill, the family member of whom he was fondest. While they lived in Ohio, his father installed sound systems for the Automatic Musical Instrument Distribution Company (AMI), which made player pianos and, later, jukeboxes, and then worked for the Triangle Music Company, distributor of Aireon jukeboxes. In 1942, the Morlock family moved to St. Petersburg, Florida, where young Fred started singing when he was in first grade, coached by his mother, she claimed. Around 1947, when in sixth grade, he started playing guitar. His parents had separated in 1945, divorcing in 1949, and his father returned to Cleveland.

In the late 1950s, Neil was writing songs professionally in New York City's Brill Building, a center for music industry offices and professional songwriters. While composing at the Brill Building for other artists, Neil recorded six mostly rockabilly-pop singles for different labels as a solo artist. He wrote songs that were recorded by early rock and roll artists, such as Buddy Holly ("Come Back Baby" 1958, co-credited to Holly's producer, Norman Petty) and Roy Orbison ("Candy Man" 1961, co-written with Beverly Ross).

With his 12-string guitar and distinctive bass-baritone voice, Neil was considered the king of the MacDougal Street/Greenwich Village folksingers. With Lou Gossett, starting in February 1961 he co-hosted an afternoon hootenanny at Cafe Wha?. Bob Dylan recalled that when he arrived at the Village, he was advised to seek Neil there, and, when he did, Neil invited Dylan to join him on stage. Photos from July 20, 1961, depict Neil, Karen Dalton, Mark Spoelstra, and an unidentified conga player, with Dylan on harmonica. In addition to Dalton, early on Neil also performed alongside Dino Valenti. Neil met Vince Martin in 1962, and they formed a singing partnership; his first LP, Tear Down The Walls (1964) was recorded with Martin. A New Yorker, Martin had relocated to Florida in 1960, and soon settled in Coconut Grove, where Neil followed him after their initial musical meeting, and where he returned regularly for years after. During 1965 and 1966 Neil was joined on many live sets by the Seventh Sons, a trio led by Buzzy Linhart on guitar and vibes. Neil released Bleecker & MacDougal on Elektra Records in 1965, reissued in 1970 as A Little Bit of Rain. His album Fred Neil, released in 1967, relaunched in 1969 as Everybody's Talkin', was recorded during his residencies in Greenwich Village and Coconut Grove, with one session taking place in Los Angeles.

After "Everybody's Talkin'", Neil's best-known songs are "Other Side of This Life", covered by The Lovin' Spoonful on their debut album, Do You Believe in Magic and Jefferson Airplane on their live album Bless Its Pointed Little Head; and "The Dolphins", which was later recorded by several artists, including Linda Ronstadt, It's a Beautiful Day, The The, Richie Havens, Billy Bragg, Beth Orton, and Tim Buckley. In particular, Jefferson Airplane considered Neil a major influence, and he was a frequent visitor to their Haight-Ashbury house at 2400 Fulton Street in San Francisco. Neil reminded Grace Slick of Winnie the Pooh, and her nickname for him was "Poohneil". The minor Airplane hit "The Ballad of You and Me and Pooneil" was written for Neil. Sebastian's song "Coconut Grove" from the album Hums of the Lovin' Spoonful was a tribute to Neil.

Blues and folk singer Lisa Kindred credits Neil with being her mentor in the early 1960s.

Interested in dolphins since the mid-1960s, when he began visiting the Miami Seaquarium, Neil, with Ric O'Barry, founded the Dolphin Research Project in 1970, an organization dedicated to stopping the capture, trafficking and exploitation of dolphins worldwide. Increasingly involved in that pursuit, Neil progressively disappeared from the recording studio and live performance, with only occasional performances in the rest of the 1970s.

== Later life and death ==
Neil left Woodstock in the mid-1970s and spent his remaining decades on the shores of South Florida involved in the Dolphin Project. After a guest appearance with Stephen Stills at New York City's Madison Square Garden in 1971, Neil began a long retirement, performing in public mostly at gigs for the Dolphin Project in Coconut Grove. He performed with John Sebastian on harmonica, Harvey Brooks on bass, and Peter Childs on guitar at the Montreux Jazz Festival in July 1975. Michael Lang, one of the organizers of the 1969 Woodstock Festival and a habitué of Coconut Grove in the 1970s, tried unsuccessfully to release this as a live LP. In an ensemble called the Rolling Coconut Revue, which included Sebastian, Brooks, Childs, and pianist Richard Bell, Neil played at the Save the Whales benefit concert in Tokyo, April 8–10, 1977. Neil's last public performance was in 1981, at an outdoor concert at the Old Grove Pub in Coconut Grove, where he joined Buzzy Linhart for one song and stayed onstage for the rest of the set.

Many of Neil's 1970s recordings remain unissued, including a 1973 session with Quicksilver Messenger Service guitarist John Cipollina and some Woodstock recordings with guitarist Arlen Roth. According to Ric O'Barry, Neil recorded two albums of cover songs in 1977 and 1978 that Columbia Records did not release. O'Barry said he produced the first of the recordings in Miami, and that Neil was joined by Pete Childs on guitar, John Sebastian on harmonica, and Harvey Brooks on bass. The second album was more fully arranged, with Neil accompanied by the New York session band Stuff and some old friends, including Slick Aguilar. The songs on these albums were written by Bobby Charles, John Braheny, Bobby Ingram, Billy Joe Shaver, and Billy Roberts (composer of "Hey Joe").

Through the 1980s, Neil retreated from music and public life, living in Florida. In June 1987, in Miami, he was involved in an accident that killed Christine Purcell, his girlfriend, when she hotwired her camper truck, which had a defective starter, and called for Neil to start the vehicle. Apparently she had not put it fully into neutral or set a parking brake, and the wheels ran over her, causing "massive blunt trauma". Afterward, Neil moved from Coconut Grove, visiting New York, travelling to Mexico and Texas, then, by the early 1990s, relocating to coastal Oregon. In 1996, he returned east, to the Florida Keys. In 1998, he remarked on a sore on his face that he claimed was a spider bite. It was the first sign of a later-diagnosed squamous-cell carcinoma, for which he received radiation treatment and surgery. The cancer returned in 2001, and he was scheduled to begin chemotherapy on July 16, but he was found dead on July 7. He was reported to have died of natural causes, and to have left a written will on his nightstand.

== Legacy ==
Neil gained public recognition in 1969, when Nilsson's recording of "Everybody's Talkin'" was featured in the film Midnight Cowboy; the song became a hit and won a Grammy Award. His song "Another Side to this Life" became a hit for The Animals and was also covered by Gram Parsons and Peter, Paul and Mary.

He was one of the pioneers of the folk rock and singer-songwriter musical genres, his most prominent musical descendants being Tim Buckley, Stephen Stills, David Crosby and Joni Mitchell. In Neil's obituary in Rolling Stone, Anthony DeCurtis wrote, "So why is Neil a hero to David Crosby? Because back when Crosby was an aspiring folkie who just arrived in New York, Neil bothered to take an interest in him, just as he did for the young Bob Dylan, who backed Neil on harmonica at the Cafe Wha? in Greenwich Village. 'He taught me that everything was music,' Crosby says." His most frequently cited disciples are Karen Dalton, Tim Hardin, Dino Valenti, Vince Martin, Peter Stampfel of the avant-folk ensemble the Holy Modal Rounders, John Sebastian, Gram Parsons, Jerry Jeff Walker, Barry McGuire, and Paul Kantner (Jefferson Airplane). Some of Neil's early compositions were recorded by Buddy Holly and Roy Orbison. He played guitar on the demo version of Bobby Darin's 1958 hit "Dream Lover", and was a demo singer on a late-1950s Elvis Presley movie soundtrack session. He recorded "One Heart," a song by Doc Pomus and Scott Turner (misidentified by Neil biographer Peter Lee Neff as "Steve"). According to Turner, the song arrived in Los Angeles too late to be used in the film.

In his memoir, Richie Havens recalls first seeing Neil in a duo with Martin at Cafe Wha?, and that "Tear Down the Walls" was the first protest song he had heard in Greenwich Village, "the first to point me in a clear direction". He also remembers Neil and Valenti's version of Ray Charles's "What'd I Say?" They would continue performing while making their way out the cafe's back door, then returning through the front, while keeping the song going. "I can still see and hear Neil and Valenti coming down that center aisle, raising the roof of the Wha?, 'tearing down the walls' that were keeping me from expressing what I needed to do."

== Personal life ==
In 1955, at the end of two years of military service in the navy, Fred Morlock married Leilani Lee Michaels, a "Fran Malione Dancer" in San Francisco, a "photographers' model," and later a beauty-pageant queen and "Geary Girl." They lived with Fred's mother in St. Petersburg, and separated a year later. In August 1958, in New York, Neil married Elaine Berman after she became pregnant with their son, Kenny. She had worked at Grey Advertising until her pregnancy compelled her to quit her job. Faced with the costs of family life, she worked as a secretary at Southern Music Publishing, while Neil wrote songs and performed. They separated in 1960. (In 1965, she married Tony Orlando.) In 1963, Neil and Linda Watson started living together, in Miami, and in time they married, having a son, Christopher. Their marriage ended in 1968. When Neil moved to Woodstock, New York, in 1969, he met and married Judy Cruickshank, and they lived in a cabin in Saugerties, NY on the same road as Big Pink, home of Rick Danko and other members of The Band. Judy and Fred Neil had two sons, Justin and Tyson Neil.

== Discography ==
=== Albums ===
- 1964: Tear Down the Walls (Elektra) with Vince Martin
- 1965: Bleecker & MacDougal (Elektra), reissued in 1970 as A Little Bit of Rain
- 1966: Fred Neil (Capitol), reissued in 1969 as Everybody's Talkin'
- 1967: Sessions (Capitol)
- 1971: Other Side of This Life (Capitol), live and alternate versions

=== Compilations ===
- 1986: The Very Best of Fred Neil (See for Miles)
- 1998: The Many Sides of Fred Neil (Collectors' Choice)
- 2003: Do You Ever Think of Me? (Rev-Ola)
- 2004: The Sky Is Falling: The Complete Live Recordings 1965–1971 (Rev-Ola)
- 2005: Echoes of My Mind: The Best of Fred Neil 1963–1971 (Raven)
- 2008: Trav'lin' Man: The Early Singles (Fallout)

=== Anthologies including tracks by Neil ===
- 1963: Hootenanny Live at the Bitter End (FM)
- 1964: A Rootin" Tootin' Hootenanny (FM)
- 1964: World of Folk Music (FM)

=== Selected songs ===
- "Candy Man"
- "Everybody's Talkin'"
- "Ba-di-da"
- "Tear Down the Walls"
- "The Dolphins"
- "Green Rocky Road"
- "The Other Side of This Life"
- "Country Boy & Bleecker Street"
- "Blues on the Ceiling"
- "Wild Child in a World of Trouble"
- "FareTheeWell"
- "Little Bit of Rain" (Note: In 2019, his performance of "Little Bit of Rain" is heard in "Episode 3" of the second season of The End of the F***ing World.)
- "That's the Bag I'm In"
