= Sessions (Fred Neil album) =

Studio album by Fred Neil
- Released: January 1968
- Recorded: October 3–10 and 23–25, 1967
- Genre: Folk rock
- Length: 41:10
- Label: Capitol
- Producer: Nick Venet

Fred Neil chronology
Fred Neil (1966)	Sessions (1968)	Other Side of This Life (1971)

Professional ratings
Review scores
Source	Rating
AllMusic	3.0/5 stars

Sessions is the third solo album from folk rock musician Fred Neil.

== Track listing ==
All tracks composed by Fred Neil, except where noted

Side one

1. "Felicity" – 2:12
2. "Send Me Somebody to Love" – 3:36 (Percy Mayfield)
3. "Merry Go Round" – 5:51(contains traditional In the Pines)
4. "Look Over Yonder" – 8:31

Side two

1. "Fools Are a Long Time Coming" – 5:19 (Herb Metoyer)
2. "Looks Like Rain" – 7:16
3. "Roll On Rosie" – 8:25

== Personnel ==
- Fred Neil – acoustic guitar, vocals
- Bruce Langhorne – acoustic guitar
- Eric Glen Hord – acoustic guitar
- Pete Childs – acoustic guitar
- Cyrus Faryar – acoustic guitar
- James E. Bond, Jr. – bass

== Production ==
- Nick Venet – producer
- Pete Johnson – liner notes

== Sources ==
- Neff, Peter Lee (2019). That's the Bag I'm In: The Life, Music and Mystery of Fred Neil. Nashville: Blue Ceiling Publishing. ISBN 978-1-7330164-0-7.
