= John Duffy (economist) =

American economist (born 1964)

John Duffy (born January 2, 1964) is an American economist. He is a professor of economics at the University of California, Irvine.

== Education and career ==
Duffy earned an AB in economics from the University of California, Berkeley and a PhD in economics from the University of California, Los Angeles. He is a professor of economics at the University of California, Irvine and is also affiliated with the Institute for Social and Economic Research (ISER) at Osaka University. He was previously a professor of economics at the University of Pittsburgh. Duffy's research interests are behavioral economics, experimental economics, game theory and macroeconomics. His work has been published in The American Economic Review and The Review of Economic Studies, among other venues.

Duffy is known for promoting the use of experimental methods to evaluate macroeconomic models and assumptions and to address questions of equilibrium selection. He advocates for the use of experimental methods to empirically validate agent-based models and heterogeneous agent models.

== Selected works ==
- Duffy, John and Daniela Puzzello. "The Friedman Rule: Experimental Evidence" International Economic Review 63 (2022), 671–698.
- Duffy, John and Frank Heinemann. "Central Bank Reputation, Cheap Talk and Transparency as Substitutes for Commitment: Experimental Evidence" Journal of Monetary Economics 117 (2021), 887–903.
- Duffy, John, Sean Crockett and Yehuda Izhakian. "An Experimental Test of the Lucas Asset Pricing Model," Review of Economic Studies 86 (2019), 627–667.
- Duffy, John and Daniela Puzzello, "Gift Exchange versus Monetary Exchange: Theory and Evidence," American Economic Review 104 (2014), 1735–1776.
- Duffy, John and Eric O’N. Fisher, "Sunspots in the Laboratory," American Economic Review 95 (2005), 510–529.
- Duffy, John and Jack Ochs, "Emergence of Money as a Medium of Exchange: An Experimental Study," American Economic Review 89 (1999), 847–877.

== See also ==
- Eli Berman
- Peter Navarro
- Jay Bhattacharya
