= Winston Churchill Square =

Square in Manhattan, New York

Coordinates: 40.7299°N 74.0024°W

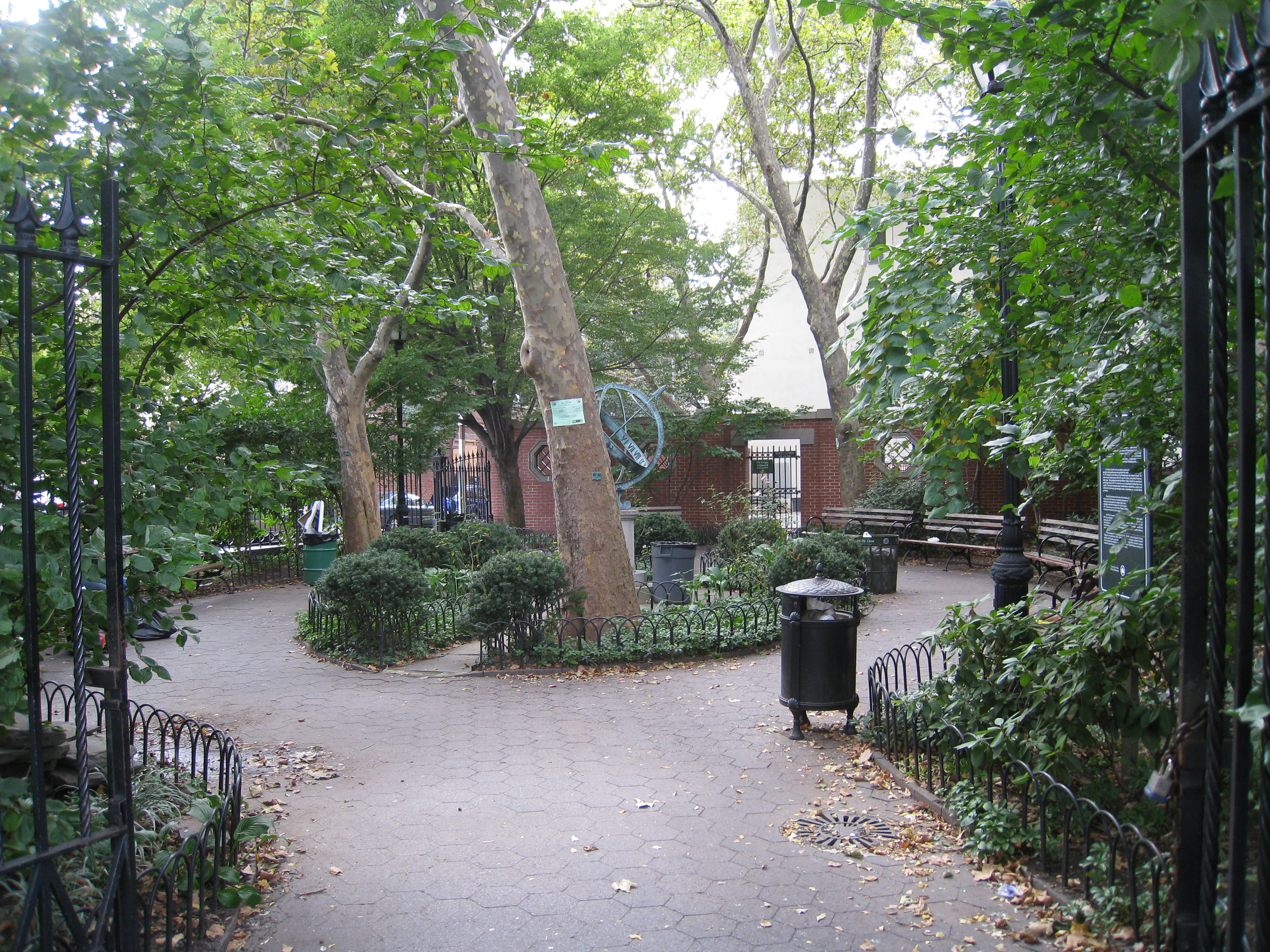
- The park in 2008
- Interactive map of Winston Churchill Square
- Location: Manhattan, New York City, U.S.

Sir Winston Churchill Square, at the southwest corner of Bleecker Street, Downing Street, and Sixth Avenue, is a .05-acre (0.020 ha) garden and sitting area in the Greenwich Village neighborhood of Manhattan, New York City.

== History ==
New York City Department of Parks & Recreation purchased the parcel in 1943. George Vellonakis designed the sitting area, which was rebuilt from 1998 to 1999. The Bedford Downing Block Association assists with the square's maintenance. Professor Emeritus Bert Waggott, of Cooper Union and Pratt Institute, has overseen all maintenance since Spring 2002, until his passing in May 2014. Prof. Waggott ran a crew of volunteers - yet still performed most of what remains to this day, thanks in part to the efforts of his widow Rosemarie. Artist Bob Brisley currently oversees all design, maintenance, and plantings, building upon what remains of former gardener Waggott's genius, keeping alive a vibrantly colorful and lovely park. The park features an ornamental armillary sphere at its center.
