= Manny Roth =

American nightclub club owner (1919–2014)

- Born: Manuel Lee Roth; November 25, 1919; New Castle, Indiana, U.S.
- Died: July 25, 2014 (aged 94); Ojai, California, U.S.
- Education: University of Miami
- Occupation: Businessman
- Known for: Founder of Cafe Wha?
- Relatives: David Lee Roth (nephew)
- Military service
- Allegiance: United States
- Branch: United States Army Air Forces
- Awards: Distinguished Flying Cross

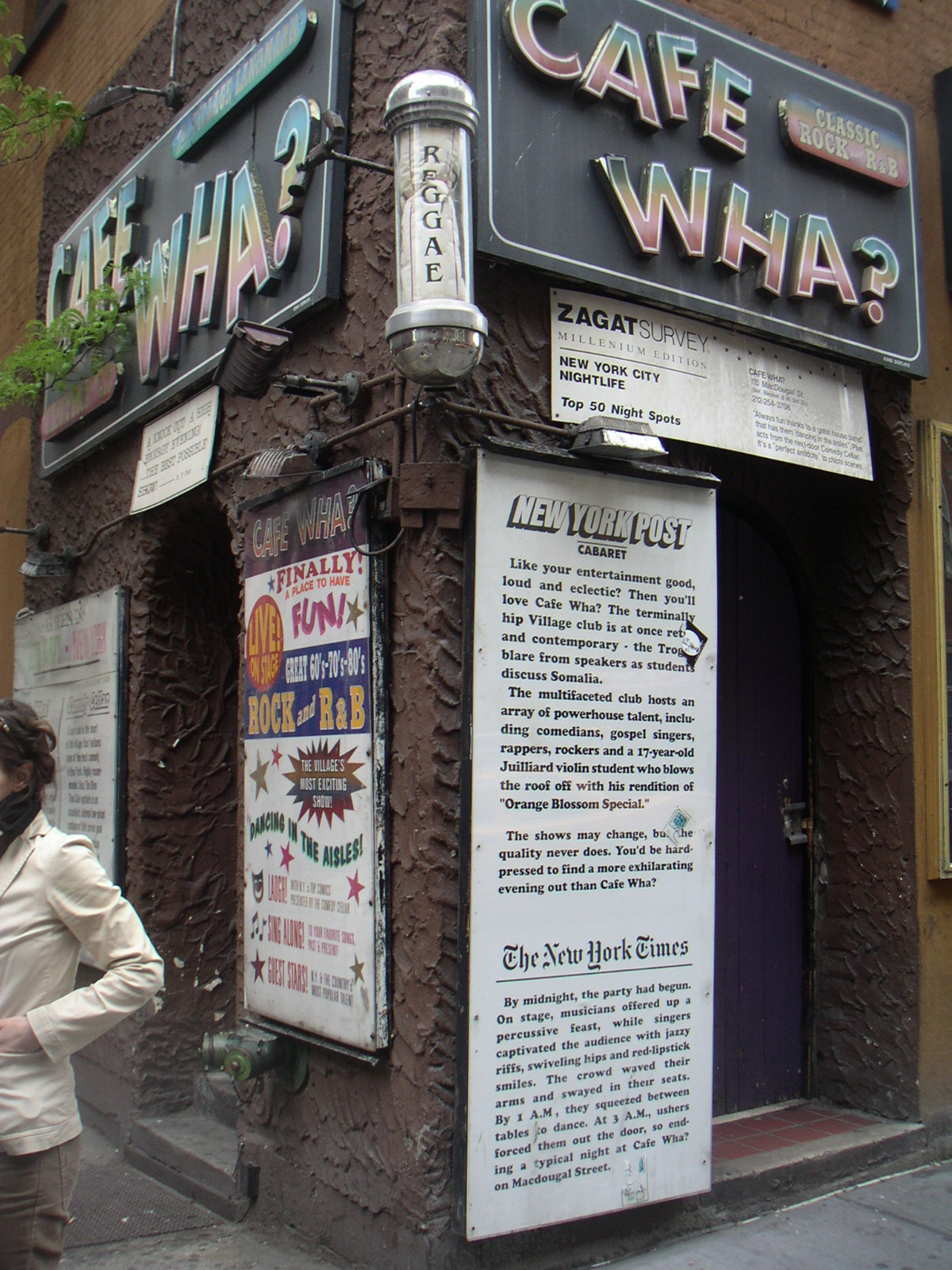
Cafe Wha? in Greenwich Village

Manuel Lee Roth (November 25, 1919 – July 25, 2014) was an American nightclub owner and entertainment entrepreneur. He founded the New York club Cafe Wha?

== Early life ==
Roth was born in November 1919 in New Castle, Indiana. His family owned a small grocery store. He studied business and theater at the University of Miami, but did not complete his studies before enlisting in the United States Army during World War II. Roth was a navigator in bombing missions in Germany, earning the Distinguished Flying Cross.

After leaving the Army, he stayed in Germany and helped manage a United Service Organization theater. He then completed his degree at University of Miami.

In the 1950s, Roth started the Cock and Bull, a Broadway-themed club in Greenwich Village in New York, which eventually became The Bitter End.

== Cafe Wha? ==
In 1959, Roth opened Cafe Wha? at 115 MacDougal Street in Greenwich Village, in what used to be a basement garage and horse stable. Roth tiled the floor and painted the walls himself. In the early 1960s, Cafe Wha? provided a launching place for amateur music and comedy acts including Bob Dylan, Jimi Hendrix, Bruce Springsteen, The Velvet Underground, Cat Mother & the All Night Newsboys, Kool & the Gang, Peter, Paul and Mary, Woody Allen, Lenny Bruce, Joan Rivers, Bill Cosby, and Richard Pryor.

Because of financial difficulties, Roth sold Cafe Wha? in 1968.

== Later career ==
After leaving Cafe Wha?, Roth moved to Woodstock, New York, and opened a diner. In following years, he worked in real estate in New York. He died at his Ojai, California, home on July 25, 2014, from natural causes.

Manny Roth was married to Jai Italiaander and later to Marlyse Medel. He has two daughters and one son. Van Halen lead vocalist David Lee Roth is his nephew.
