= Cafe Wha? =

Music venue in Manhattan, New York

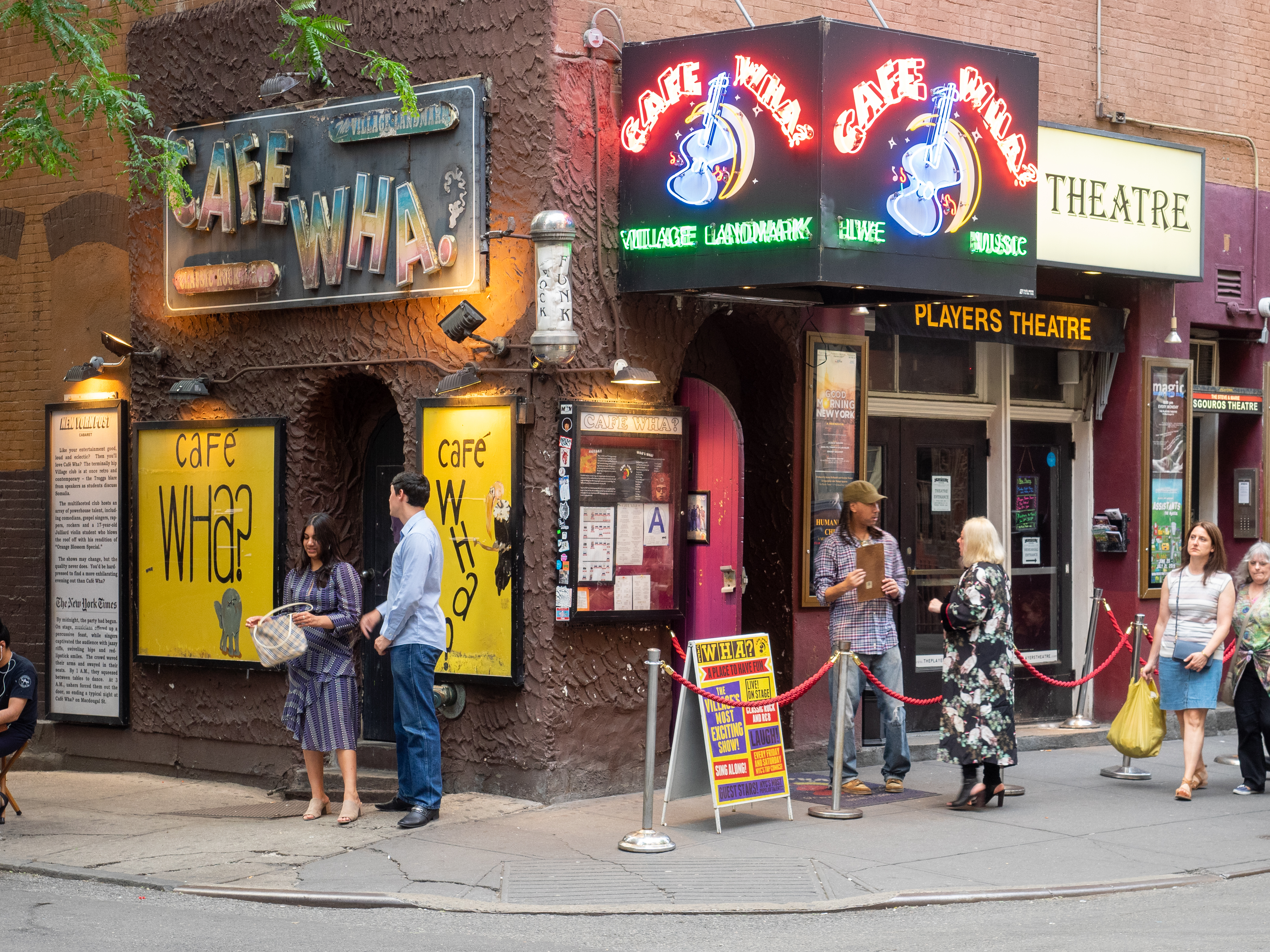
- Cafe Wha? in 2019
- Interactive map of Cafe Wha?
- Location: 115 MacDougal Street; New York City, United States
- Coordinates: 40°43′48.2″N 74°00′01.8″W
- Owner: Manny Roth; Menachem Dworman; Noam Dworman
- Capacity: 325
- Type: Music venue
- Events: Rock, Folk

Construction
- Opened: 1959

Website
- https://cafewha.com/

Cafe Wha? is a music club at the corner of MacDougal Street and Minetta Lane in the Greenwich Village neighborhood of Manhattan, New York City. The club is important in the history of rock and folk music, having presented numerous musicians and comedians early on in their careers, including Dave Van Ronk; Bob Dylan; Jimi Hendrix; Bruce Springsteen; the Velvet Underground; Cat Mother & the All Night Newsboys; Kool & the Gang; Peter, Paul and Mary; Woody Allen; Lenny Bruce; Joan Rivers; Bill Cosby; and Richard Pryor.

The club's motto is "Greenwich Village's Swingingest Coffee House".

== History ==
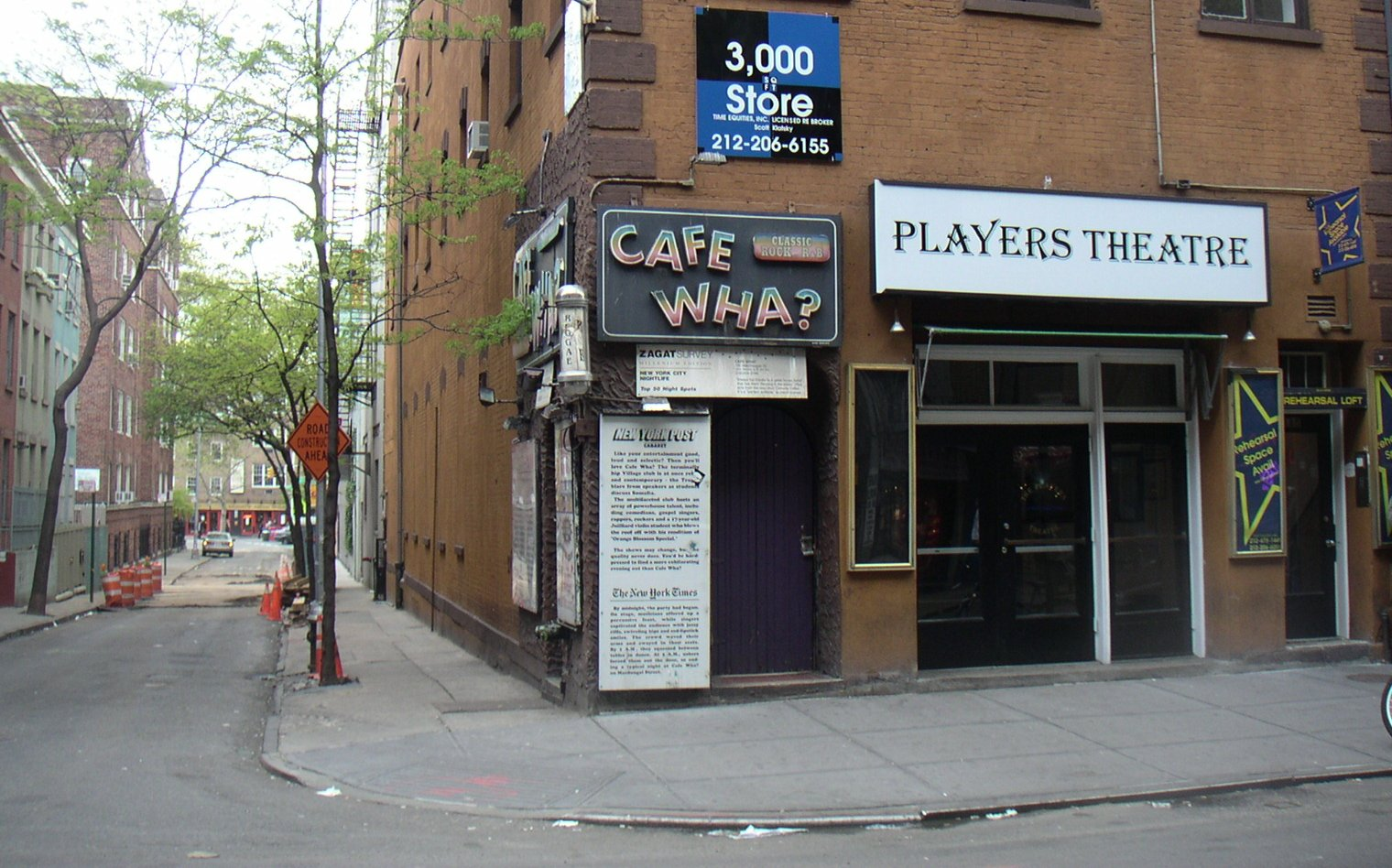
Cafe Wha? in May 2005

Cafe Wha? was opened in 1959 by Manny Roth, an actor and World War II veteran, at 115 MacDougal Street in New York City. Entered down a steep staircase, the basement space was formerly a horse stable, and Roth laid the marble tile himself. He painted the walls black to make the space seem like a cave. The club was a coffeeshop selling food and drinks, and eventually charged a cover for entry.

According to the cafe's website, the "Wha?" in "Cafe Wha?" is a shortening of the word "What?", intended to convey incredulity. By another account, "Wha?" was the broken-English interjection uttered by Roth's mother when at a loss for words.

Musicians, comedians, and performers of all types played throughout the afternoon and evening, frequently being paid through baskets passed amongst the audience. The space had a capacity of 325 people. Describing Cafe Wha? in his memoir, Chronicles: Volume One, Bob Dylan wrote that it was "a subterranean cavern, liquorless, ill lit, low ceiling, like a wide dining room with chairs and tables."

In 1968, Roth stopped running Cafe Wha?, and it was taken over by Menachem "Manny" Dworman, who ran the Cafe Feenjon in the location until 1987. The Feenjon featured Israeli and Middle Eastern music.

The Cafe Wha? house band plays dynamic, high-energy versions of popular songs, and encourages an informal atmosphere between the stage and audience.

In 1997, Cafe Wha? opened Brazil Night on Mondays, a show created and produced by Andre Alves. The show was performed for over five years.

== Notable artists ==
Bob Dylan first performed at Cafe Wha? during a hootenanny night on January 24, 1961, after hitchhiking across the country. He continued playing at the club as a backup harmonica player during the afternoon.

In 1962, Herbert Khaury, later known as Tiny Tim, performed at the club for two weeks, where he became friends with Dylan. Khaury was fired after a performance of the song "Nature Boy" which the management "thought [...] looked like an epileptic fit."

Before she was part of the folk trio Peter, Paul and Mary, Mary Travers was a waitress at Cafe Wha?

Based on the recommendation of folk singer Richie Havens, Roth hired Jimi Hendrix as a recurring performer in 1966. Billed as "Jimmy James and the Blue Flames", he played five sets a night, six nights a week. Chas Chandler, the bassist for the Animals, discovered Hendrix at Cafe Wha? and brought him to England to promote his career.

In 1967, Bruce Springsteen's band, the Castiles, played afternoon sets for two months.

Van Halen singer David Lee Roth is the nephew of Manny Roth, and he and Van Halen performed at Cafe Wha? in 2012.

Notable comedians who performed at the club early in their careers include Woody Allen, Lenny Bruce, Joan Rivers, Bill Cosby, and Richard Pryor.

== See also ==
- The Gaslight Cafe
- Cafe Au Go Go
- Live at The Cafe Au Go Go
- Gerde's Folk City
- The Bitter End
