= Eve's Hangout =

Lesbian bar in New York City (1925–1926)

- Eve Adams' Tearoom
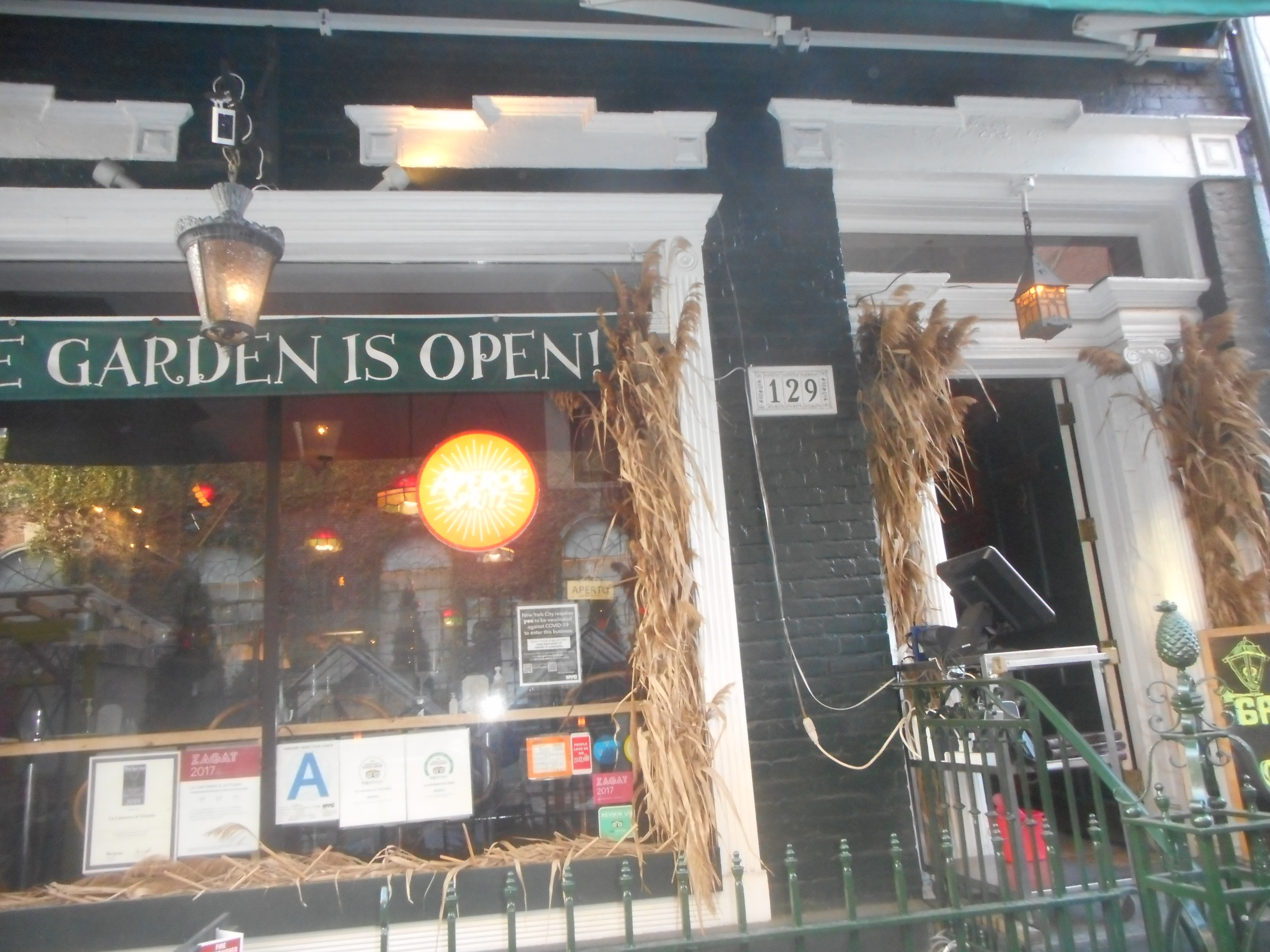
- The former site of Eve's Hangout, now a restaurant, and wine tasting room.
- Interactive map of Eve's Hangout
- Address: 129 MacDougal Street; Manhattan, New York City
- Coordinates: 40.73098°N 74.00018°W
- Owner: Eva Kotchever
- Type: Speakeasy, Lesbian bar, Tearoom

Construction
- Opened: 1925
- Years active: 2

Eve's Hangout was a New York City lesbian nightclub, Teahouse and restaurant, established by Polish-Jewish feminist Eva Kotchever in Greenwich Village, Lower Manhattan, in 1925. The establishment was also known as "Eve Adams' Tearoom", a pun on the names Eve and Adam. (Note: Eva Kotchever was born Chawa Zloczower in Poland and it seems that her name has been spelled as "Eva Kotchever" at Ellis Island in 1912 when she was 21-year-old. In fact, she was in Greenwich Village better known as Eve Adams (sometimes spelled Eve Addams), and the Eve's Hangout is therefore often said "Eve's Adams Tearoom". Otherwise, Kotchever's pen name was Evelyn Adams)

== History ==
After running "The Gray Cottage" with Ruth Norlander in Chicago in 1921–1923, Kotchever left Norlander and moved to Greenwich Village, which had become an important area for the gay and lesbian community in New York City.

In 1925, Kotchever opened "Eve's Hangout" at 129 MacDougal Street, a mecca for bohemian New Yorkers. The only source that mentions a famous sign on the door that allegedly read "Men are admitted, but not welcome" is a 1926 article in Variety, which accused Adams of being financed by "a ring of rich women cultists" and inviting "mannish" women preying on girls. This led Adams's biographer, Jonathan Ned Katz, to claim that the sign "probably never existed".

The place was a haven for lesbians and migrants, working-class people, and intellectuals. It became a popular club, especially for artists like Berenice Abbott. Kotchever organized concerts and readings and meetings where it was acceptable to talk about love between women, political matters, and liberal ideas. Consequently, Kotchever became a notable figure of "The Village".

== Police raid and closure ==
Bobby Edwards, writing for the Greenwich Village Quill, described the club as a place that was "Not very healthy for she-adolescents, nor comfortable for he-men." An upstairs neighbor complained to the police. On June 11, 1926, the Vice Squad of NYPD organized a raid on the bar. One of the detectives, the young Margaret Leonard, discovered the book Lesbian Love, that Kotchever wrote under the pseudonym Evelyn Adams. Kotchever was charged with and found guilty of obscenity and disorderly conduct. The bar did not survive the arrest of its owner and soon closed. Kotchever was imprisoned at Jefferson Market before being deported from the United States to Europe, but Greenwich Village did not forget her. (Note: Eva Kotchever was arrested in Nice by the French police and Nazis in 1943, just before she was scheduled to join her family in Palestine. She was emprisonned near Paris at Drancy internment camp before to be murdered at Auschwitz's gas chambers. The city of Paris paid tribute to Kotchever by naming a school and street after her.)

== Legacy ==
Eve's Hangout is notable for LGBT history. It is considered one of the first lesbian bars in the United States and is recognized as part a New York City's heritage, and is recognized as historic by the National Park Service. It is included on tours for Europeans on official US websites, and has become a must-see.

Playwright Barbara Kahn wrote a play, "The Spring and Fall of Eve Adams", and musical, "Unreachable Eden", about Eve's Hangout.

Since 1977, the building houses an Italian restaurant named La Lanterna di Vittorio.

== See also ==
- LGBT culture in New York City
- List of LGBT culture in New York City
- Lesbophobia
- United States obscenity law
