= Eve Adams (writer) =

Polish feminist writer (1891–1943)

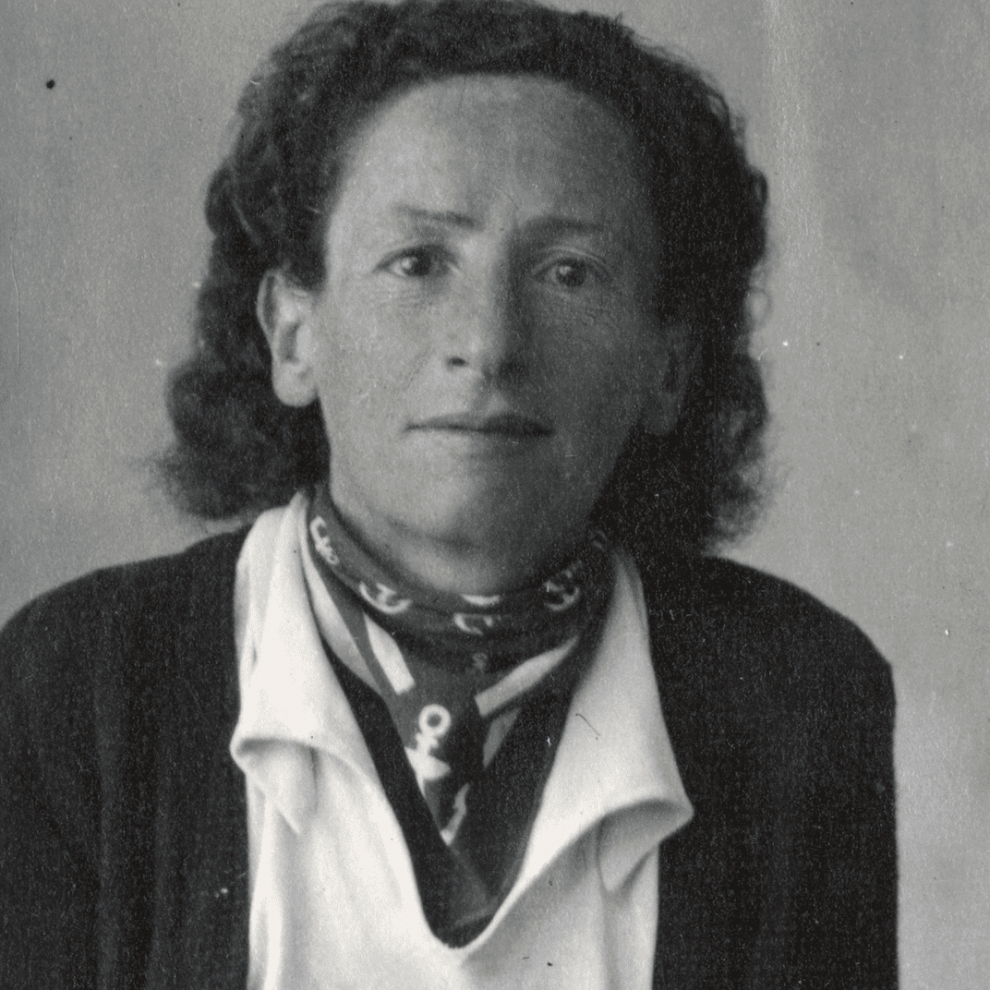
- passport photo in 1941
- Born: Chawa Złoczower; 15 June 1891; Mława, Congress Poland, Russian Empire
- Died: 19 December 1943 (aged 51–52); Auschwitz, Nazi German occupated Poland
- Occupations: Writer, novelist, bartender

Signature
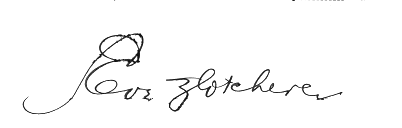

Chawa Złoczower (15 June 1891 – 19 December 1943), known also as Eve Adams or Eve Addams in the United States and referred to in some sources as Eva Kotchever, was a Polish-Jewish émigré writer. The author of the short story collection Lesbian Love, she also ran Eve's Hangout, a popular, openly lesbian literary salon in Greenwich Village, Lower Manhattan, in 1925 and 1926. It closed after Eva was convicted and jailed for obscenity and disorderly conduct, which resulted in her deportation to Poland in 1927.

After a new life in Paris, she was later arrested in Nice, France, in 1943, then deported to the French Drancy internment camp and to Auschwitz concentration camp on 17 December, where she was murdered two days later on 19 December.

== Biography ==
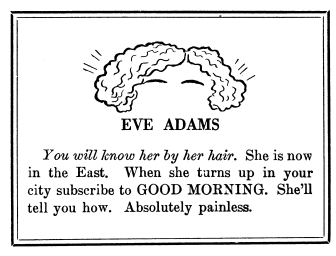
Advertisement for Eve Adams' sales services published in Good Morning, featuring a drawing of her distinctive ("You will know her by her hair") haircut.

Chawa Zloczower was apparently born on 27 June 1891 in Mława, Poland, although records differ as to her exact birth date. She was the eldest of seven children of Mordechai and Miriam Zloczower. She was remembered by her family as the oldest sister who was "the right hand" of their mother. She would later testify that she attended "primary school" in Mława and "graduated in Plotzk". She was able to speak seven languages.

At age 20, Eva emigrated to the United States through Ellis Island, New York, on the S.S. Vaderland in 1912, sailing from Antwerp, Belgium. She began using the English version of her name, Eve, and dressed in men's clothing. She became involved in the anarchist movement, distributing publications, attending rallies and befriending anarchists from Mother Earth circles such as Emma Goldman, Alexander Berkman, Ben Reitman and Henry Miller.

On 21 February 1918, Eve, as "Eve Zlotchever," wrote a fervid fan letter to actress Fania Marinoff, who starred in the free-love play, Karen. Eve later became a cross-country traveling saleswoman of leftist periodicals, such as Mother Earth and The Liberator. By 1919, she was under surveillance by the "Radical Division" of the Bureau of Investigation, run by J. Edgar Hoover, because she was considered an "agitator".

From 1921 to 1923, Eve settled in Chicago, where she continued to sell Der Groyser Kundes and offered Russian lessons. For about eight months she ran with her partner, Swedish painter Ruth Norlander, a tea room named The Gray Cottage in Chicago, at 10 E Chestnut St, a literary salon that also served as a "refuge for gay people," according to the New York Times. Norlander (born Ruth Olson in 1889) exhibited two paintings, including one called Nudes in 1922 Chicago "No-Jury Exhibit," perhaps portraying Eve, who used to pose for Norlander.

In 1923, Eve returned to New York, and signed a declaration of intention to become a US citizen. In February 1925, she wrote and published in 150 copies "for private circulation only" of Lesbian Love (written under the name Evelyn Adams), a collection of short stories describing lives of women of the lesbian community. In March 1925, she opened Eve's Hangout, also known as Eve Addams' Tearoom in Greenwich Village. The only source that mentions a famous sign that allegedly read: "Men are admitted, but not welcome" is a 1926 article from Variety, which accused Adams of being financed by "a ring of rich women cultists" and inviting "mannish" women preying on girls. This led to Adams' biographer, Jonathan Ned Katz, to claim that the sign "probably never existed".

She was arrested by New York City Police Department's Vice Squad for obscenity and disorderly conduct after undercover police detective Margaret Leonard entered the Eve's Hangout and was shown Lesbian Love. Leonard said Adams made overt sexual advances to her. After a year in jail, where she met Mae West at Jefferson Market Prison, she was deported to Poland in December 1927.

Eve lived in Warsaw, Gdańsk, and Sopot, writing to her friends in letters about the low wages and antisemitism in Poland. She regularly corresponded with Ben Reitman, even after her exile to Europe. In 1930 she moved to Paris, where she wrote "a group of prison stories" planned to be published in The New Review (the journal ceased publication before their scheduled date). In Paris, she made a living by selling "dirty" books (such as works by James Joyce, Henry Miller, Anaïs Nin and D. H. Lawrence) to American tourists. She met some of those artists (Henry Miller, June Miller, and Anaïs Nin), all regulars of Le Dôme Café, called Dômiers, in the bohemian neighborhood of Montparnasse. Meanwhile, in the U.S., exaggerated rumours about Eve Adams circulated, claiming that in Paris, she ran a bookstore and a café named Le Boudoir de l'Amour in Montmartre (Brevities, 16 November 1931), and that she actively supported the Second Spanish Republic, against the regime of General Francisco Franco. There is no factual evidence to those claims.

In 1933, Eve met and began a relationship with Jewish singer Hella Olstein Soldner (who performed under the stage name Nora/Norah Waren), and lived with her even after Hella married. They intended to emigrate to Palestine and join Eve's brother, but lacked financial means to do so. Eve also pleaded with Ben Reitman to help her get a return permit to the US. In 1940, they moved to Southern France.

In December 1943, Eve and Hella were arrested in Nice and imprisoned in the Drancy internment camp, near Paris, with Zloczewer arriving there a few days before Olstein Soldner. They were deported by cattle car train to Auschwitz in the Convoy 63 on 17 December 1943, with about 850 other Jews, only 31 of whom survived until liberation in 1945, not including Eve or Hella.

== Legacy ==
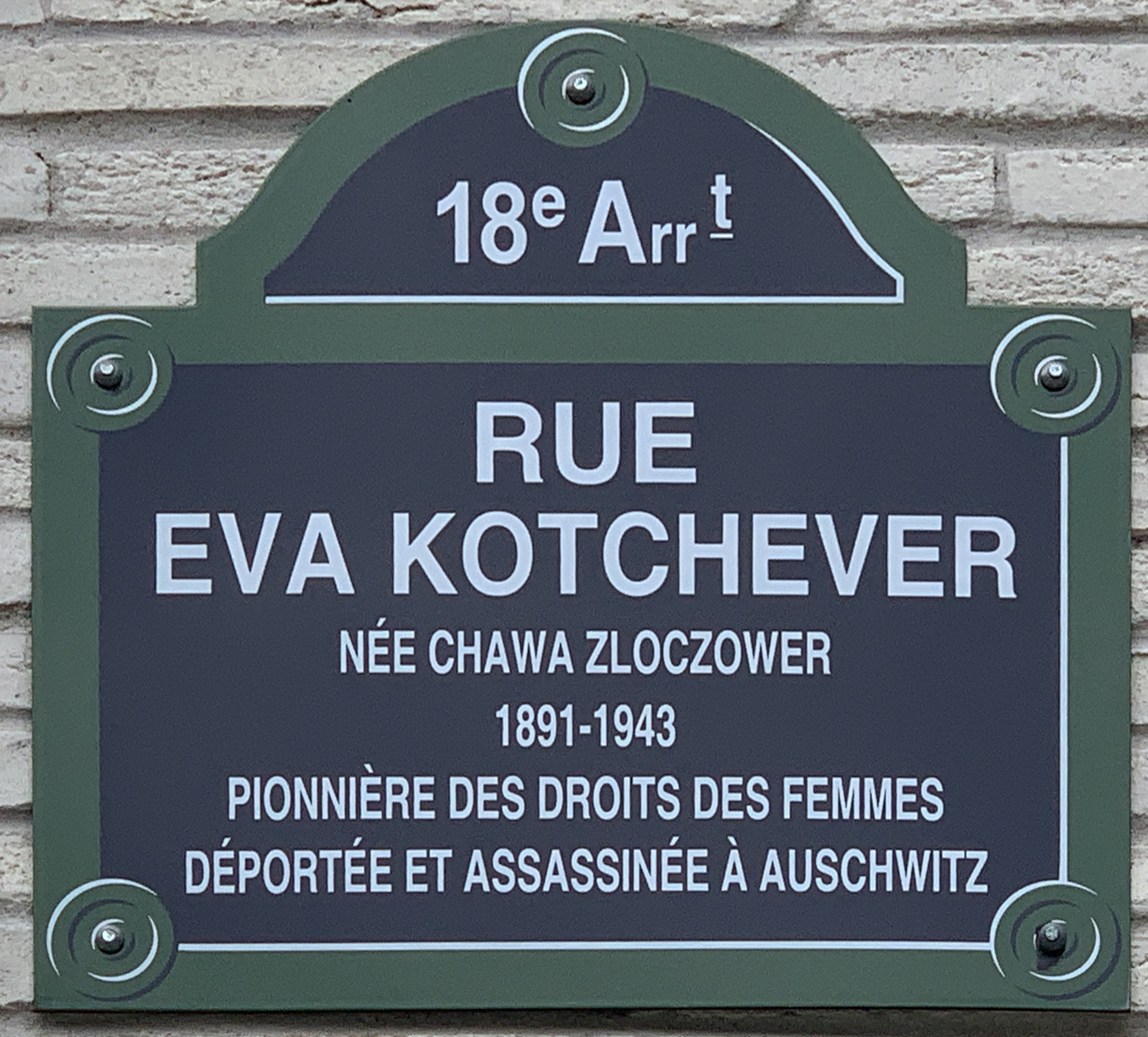
Sign for Eva Kotchever street, Paris

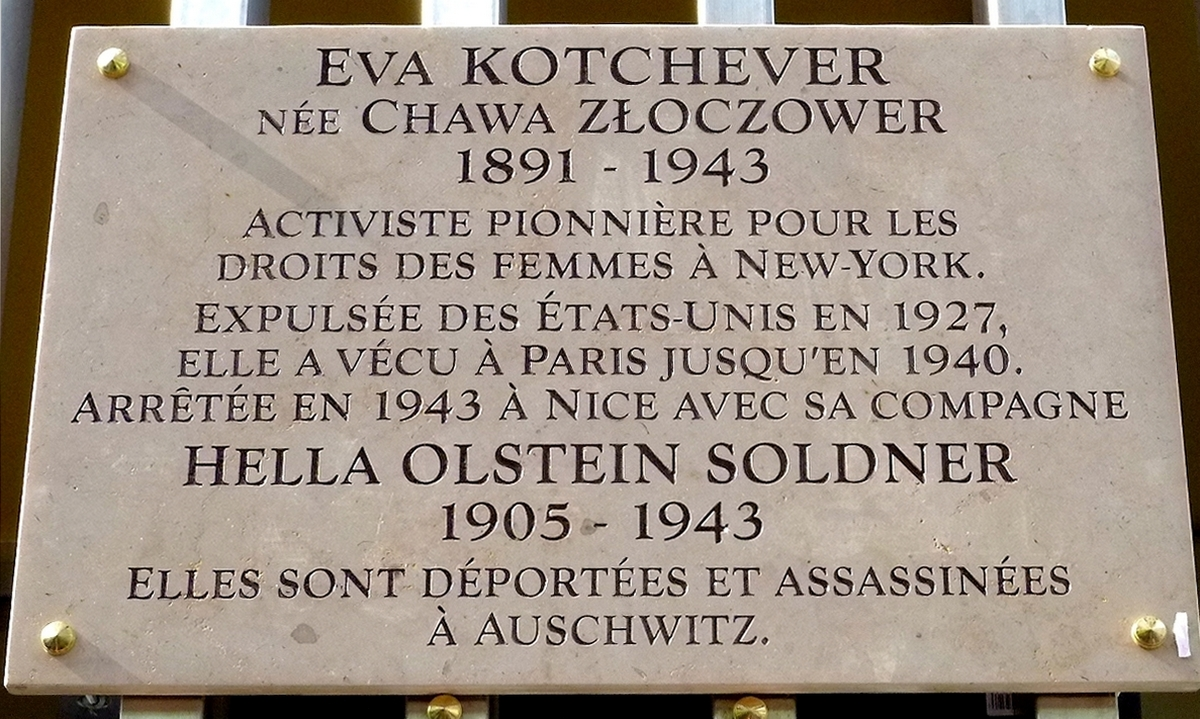
Kotchever and Olstein French official commemorative plaque near Montmartre

Playwright Barbara Kahn wrote three plays about Eve Adams, all given full productions at Theater for the New City. "The Spring and Fall of Eve Adams," "Unreachable Eden" and "Island Girls." An excerpt from "Unreachable Eden was presented at the Lower East Side Festival of the Arts. Kahn popularized the life of Eve Adams in the United States.

A street in Paris, rue Eva Kotchever, in the 18th arrondissement of Paris is named after her, as well as a public school.

Adams is now considered, especially in Europe, an LGBT icon. The City of New York and the National Park Service have commemorated her.

In 1999, what is believed to be the only remaining copy of Lesbian Love was found by Nina Alvarez, then a student in Albany, New York.

In 2021, events in her memory organized by the city of Paris and the Mémorial de la Shoah were rescheduled due to the COVID-19 pandemic in France.

In 2021, American historian Jonathan Ned Katz published the first biography of Eve, named The Daring Life and Dangerous Times of Eve Adams, featuring the original text and illustrations of rediscovered Lesbian Love.

In 2022, the Council of Paris Assembly unanimously voted to install an official commemorative plaque in her memory and that of her partner, Hella Ostein, in front of the 'école Eva Kotchever' ('Eva Kotchever school').

Since 2024, contemporary Polish artist Mikołaj Sobczak pays tribute through his work.

In 2024, America's Test Kitchen Podcast "Proof" released an episode titled "The (Tea) Room Where It Happened" about Eve and her tearoom "Eve's Hangout," produced by Reporter and Writer Lindsey Polevoy.

On June 17, 2026, tributes marking the centenary of her arrest were organised in New York City. A gathering was held outside the former Eve's Hangout with a performance of actress Lisa Kron followed by a march to Washington Square Park. Manhattan borough President Brad Hoylman-Sigal officially requested a posthumous pardon to New York State Governor Kathy Hochul, as well to Mayor Zohran Mamdani as a symbolic acknowledgment of the city of New York's responsibility for her persecution.

== See also ==
- LGBTQ culture in New York City
- List of LGBTQ people from New York City
