= The Lovin' Spoonful =

Canadian-American folk-rock band

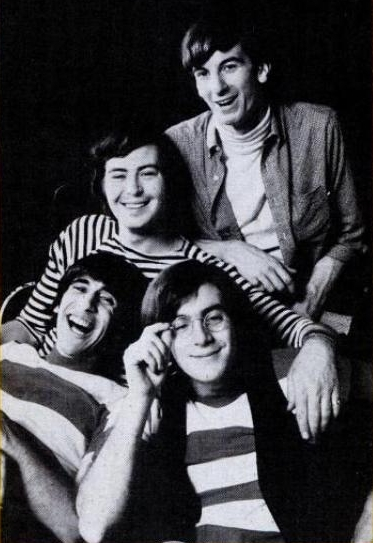
- The Lovin' Spoonful in 1965; Clockwise from bottom right: John Sebastian, Zal Yanovsky, Joe Butler and Steve Boone

Background information
- Origin: Greenwich Village, New York City, US
- Genres: Folk rock; pop; rock
- Works: Albums and singles
- Years active: 1964–1968; 1991–present
- Labels: Kama Sutra; Buddah; Elektra; Pye International
- Spinoff of: The Mugwumps
- Members: Steve Boone; (see § Members for touring members)
- Past members: John Sebastian; Zal Yanovsky; Jan Carl; Joe Butler; Jerry Yester
- Website: lovinspoonful.band

The Lovin' Spoonful is a Canadian-American folk-rock band formed in Greenwich Village, New York City, in 1964. The band were among the most popular groups in the United States for a short period in the mid-1960s and their music and image influenced many of the contemporary rock acts of their era. Beginning in July 1965 with their debut single "Do You Believe in Magic", the band had seven consecutive singles reach the Top Ten of the US charts in the eighteen months that followed, including the number-two hits "Daydream" and "Did You Ever Have to Make Up Your Mind?" and the chart-topping "Summer in the City".

Led by their primary songwriter John Sebastian, the Spoonful took their earliest influences from jug band and blues music, reworking them into a popular music format. In 1965, the band helped pioneer the development of the musical genre of folk rock. By 1966, the group were "one of the most highly regarded American bands", and they were the year's third-best-selling singles act in the US, after the Beatles and the Rolling Stones. As psychedelia expanded in popularity in 1967, the Spoonful struggled to transition their approach and saw diminished sales before disbanding in 1968.

Before they founded the Spoonful, Sebastian (guitar, harmonica, autoharp, vocals) and Zal Yanovsky (guitar, vocals) were active in Greenwich Village's folk-music scene. Aiming to create an "electric jug band", they recruited the local rock musicians Steve Boone (bass guitar) and Joe Butler (drums, vocals). The four-piece lineup honed their sound at New York nightclubs before they began recording for Kama Sutra Records with the producer Erik Jacobsen. In May 1966, at the height of the band's success, Yanovsky and Boone were arrested for marijuana possession in San Francisco. The pair revealed their drug source to authorities to avoid Yanovsky being deported to his native Canada, an action which generated tensions within the group. Due to disagreements over their artistic direction, the band fired Yanovsky in May 1967, replacing him with Jerry Yester, and Yanovsky commenced a brief and commercially unsuccessful solo career. The original iteration of the Spoonful last publicly performed in June 1968, after which time Sebastian departed the group and pursued a briefly successful solo career. The band dissolved later that year.

In 2000, the Spoonful were inducted into the Rock and Roll Hall of Fame, an occasion that saw Sebastian, Yanovsky, Boone and Butler perform together for the last time. Yanovsky died of a heart attack two years later. Sebastian has remained active as a solo act, and Boone, Butler and Yester began touring under the name the Lovin' Spoonful in 1991.

== History ==
=== 1964–1965: Formation ===
==== Greenwich Village and folk music ====
The first time I heard Zal [Yanovsky] was at Cass Elliot's house. Cass was forever the Jewish matchmaker, she was matching up boys to play in bands like a house afire. And she had us nailed as, "Oh, these guys have to work together."

— John Sebastian, 2012

The co-founders of the Lovin' Spoonful – John Sebastian and Zal Yanovsky – met on February 9, 1964, at the apartment of Cass Elliot, a mutual friend and fellow musician. (Note: Sebastian typically identifies the night at Elliot's apartment as his first time meeting Yanovsky. He has also recalled they "actually met once before", clarifying that the night at Elliot's apartment was their first time playing music together and when they became acquainted in "a very low-key setting".) Elliot was holding a party that night to watch the English rock band the Beatles make their American television debut on The Ed Sullivan Show. Elliot, Sebastian and Yanovsky were all active in the folk-music scene in Greenwich Village, a neighborhood in New York City, and the three were greatly influenced by the Beatles' performance; Sebastian later reflected, "It affected us heavily ... us [meaning] my specific generation". Later that night, Elliot encouraged Sebastian and Yanovsky to play guitars, and Sebastian remembered discovering they had "a tremendous affinity" for one another.

Sebastian, the son of the classical harmonica player John Sebastian Sr., grew up in a Village apartment which neighbored Washington Square Park. The younger Sebastian often went to the park to play music, and he also played in rock bands as a teenager at his prep school in New Jersey. He became a multi-instrumentalist, being proficient on guitar, harmonica, piano and the autoharp. Beginning in the early 1960s, he worked as a studio musician.

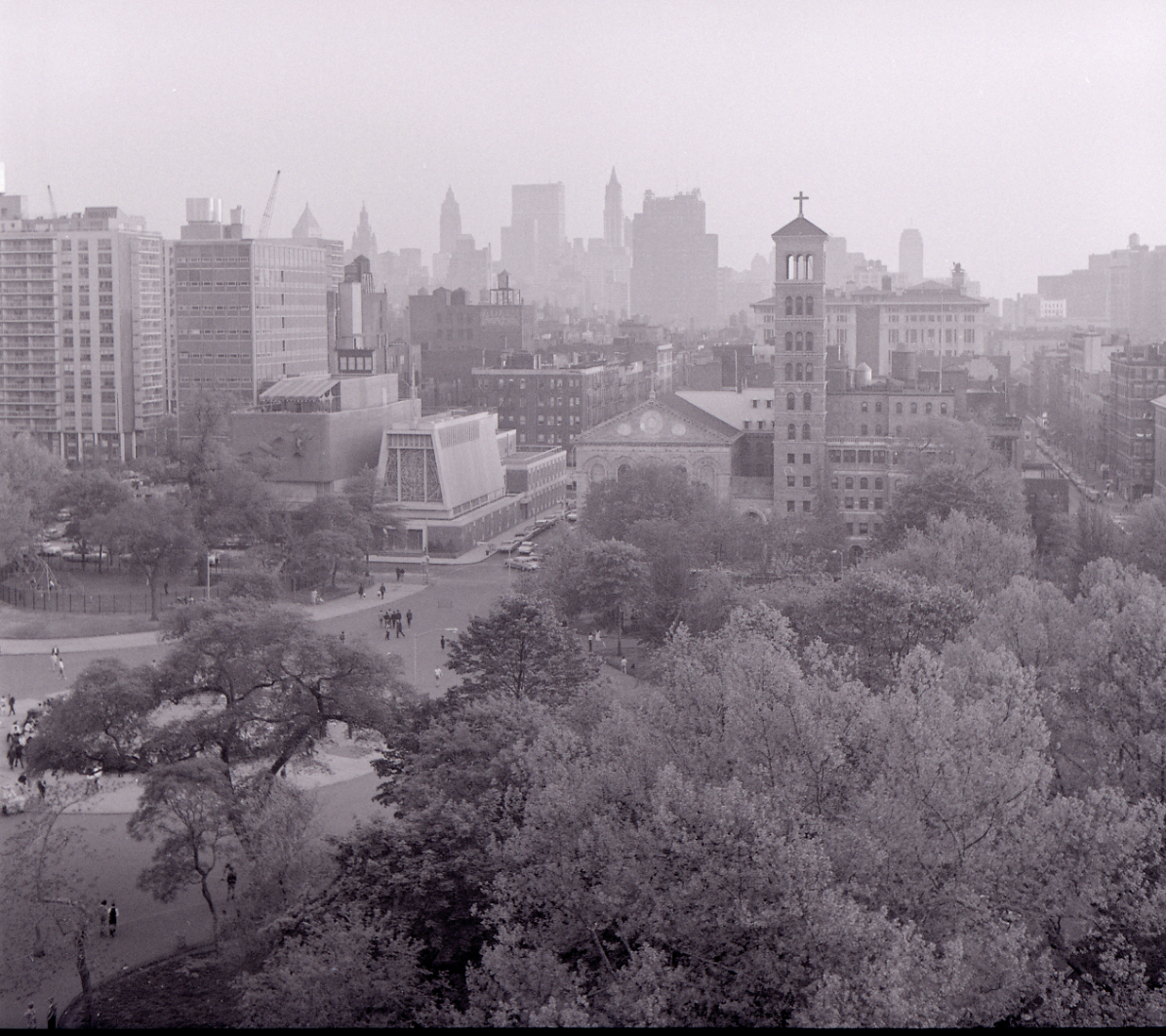
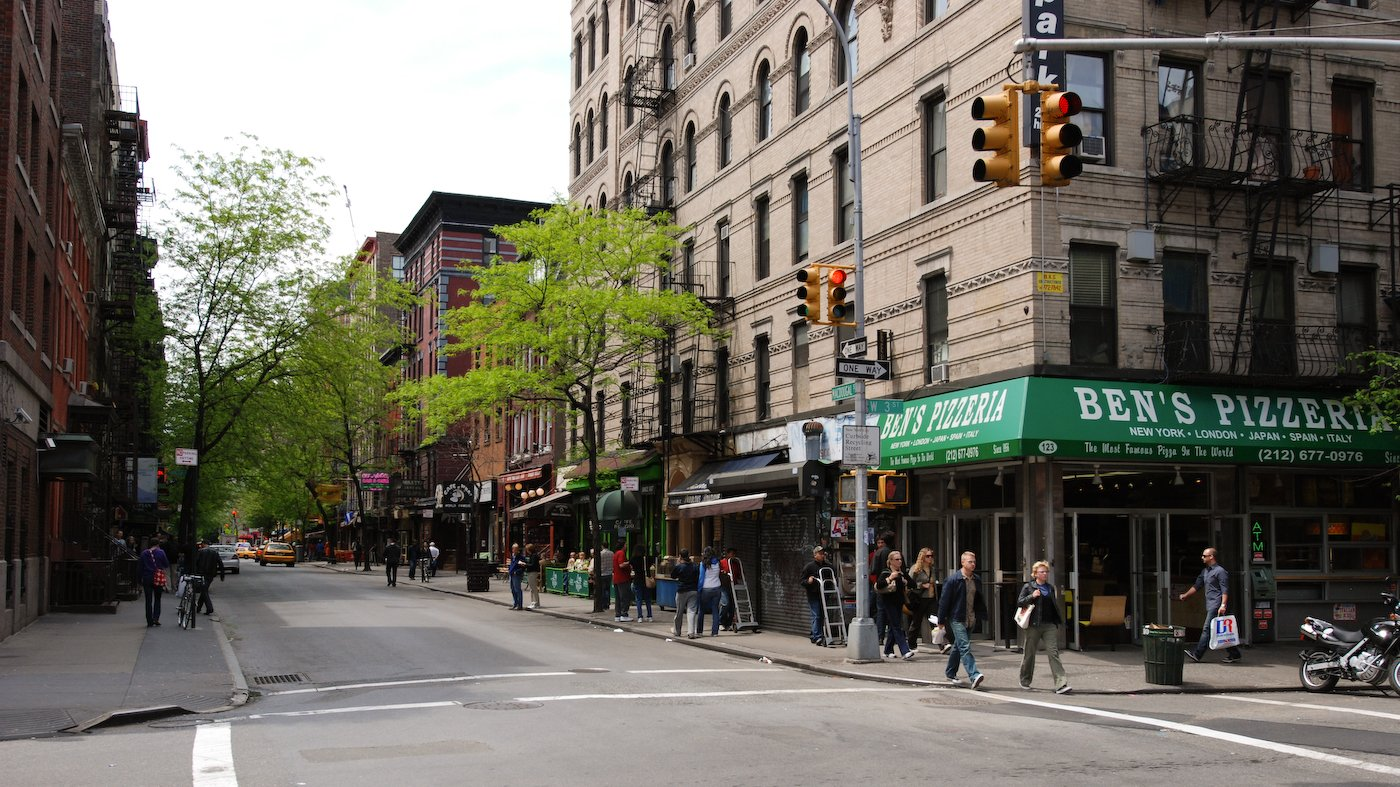
Top: Washington Square Park, 1965
Bottom: MacDougal Street, 2008
The Spoonful emerged from New York City's folk-music scene in Greenwich Village.

Yanovsky grew up in Downsview, a suburb of Toronto, Canada, and he was enmeshed as a guitar player in the city's folk-music scene, which centered on the Yorkville neighborhood. Denny Doherty, another musician active in Yorkville, invited Yanovsky to join his folk group, the Halifax Three, which later relocated to Greenwich Village. After the Halifax Three broke up in June 1964, Elliot recruited Yanovsky and Doherty to join her own group, the Mugwumps. That same year, Sebastian briefly played with another New York folk group, the Even Dozen Jug Band, before he was also recruited into the Mugwumps to play harmonica. (Note: Warner Bros. Records signed the Mugwumps in August 1964. They recorded an album of material later that month, but Sebastian joined the group too late to have contributed. The group released one single in 1964, and Warner Bros. released the rest of their recorded material in 1967, after its former members had become famous.)

Sebastian later remembered becoming enamoured with Yanovsky: "[He] amused the hell out of me. He inhaled and exhaled people and conversation and jokes and theater. He was this kind of cultural weathervane – and people gathered around him." During live performances with the Mugwumps, rather than playing folk songs straight through, Yanovsky and Sebastian often improvised off of one another on guitar and harmonica, respectively. After the Mugwumps dissolved in late 1964, Sebastian and Yanovsky began planning to form their own group, which they envisioned as an electric jug band. (Note: Elliott and Doherty went on to form the Mamas & the Papas.) Sebastian recalled: "Yanovsky and I were both aware of the fact that this commercial folk music model was about to change again, that the four-man band that actually played their own instruments and wrote their own songs was the thing." Yanovsky contacted Bob Cavallo, the former manager of the Halifax Three and the Mugwumps, who agreed to manage Sebastian and Yanovsky's group even though they had not yet performed publicly, had no songs and did not yet have a band name.

In 1964, Sebastian lived in an apartment on Prince Street in Little Italy, a Manhattan neighborhood south of Greenwich Village. That year, Erik Jacobsen, the former banjo player of the bluegrass band Knob Lick Upper 10,000, moved into the apartment next door, and the two soon bonded over their shared interests of smoking marijuana and listening to eclectic music. Like Sebastian, Jacobsen had been affected by the new sound of the Beatles; he later recalled that while touring in early 1964, he listened to the group for the first time on a jukebox: "I decided, kind of then and there I think, that I was gonna quit the Knob Lick Upper 10,000, and go to New York City, and produced electric folk music." As part of his effort to switch focus towards production, Jacobsen recorded demos for musicians in the Village, including for Sebastian. Sebastian's demos of "Warm Baby" and "Rooty-Toot" featured experimentation and exotic instruments, including African drums, bongo drums and a sitar. Jerry Yester recalled playing on "Warm Baby" with other local folk musicians, including Jesse Colin Young and Sticks Evans. (Note: Both demos went unissued, but the Spoonful rerecorded "Warm Baby" for Daydream and Sebastian included "Rooty-Toot" on his 1971 live album Cheapo-Cheapo Productions Presents Real Live.)

==== Earliest lineup ====
From 1962 to 1964, Steve Boone played bass guitar in several Long Island rock bands with the drummer Joe Butler. They both played in the Kingsmen, a band led by Boone's brother, Skip, before Boone quit in mid-1964 to spend time visiting Europe. Skip and Butler changed the band's name to the Sellouts and moved to Greenwich Village, holding a residency at Trude Heller's club as one of the neighborhood's earliest rock groups.

In December 1964, at the insistence of Butler, Boone went to the Village Music Hall, a small music club on West 3rd Street in Greenwich Village. There, he met Sebastian and Yanovsky, and though he had no background in folk music, Boone soon bonded with the two over their shared musical influences, including Elvis Presley, Chuck Berry, the Everly Brothers, Buddy Holly, Motown, the Beatles and other British Invasion acts. Sebastian played him his composition "Good Time Music" – the lyrics of which derided early 1960s rock and roll while extolling the Beatles and other new music – and the three musicians jammed different Chuck Berry and R&B numbers. Sebastian invited Boone to Jacobsen's apartment afterwards, where Boone met Jacobsen as well as Jerry Yester of the Modern Folk Quartet, a local folk music group. That week, Boone attended Sebastian's performance at a Greenwich Village club. Sebastian's show, made up of a quickly assembled group of Fred Neil, Tim Hardin, Buzzy Linhart and Felix Pappalardi, greatly impressed Boone, who later remembered it as "one of the most significant nights in my musical life." He also recalled: "I was stunned. I had never heard such power in a folk group before." The performance motivated Boone to enter the Greenwich Village folk scene and join Sebastian and Yanovsky's group.

The band was still in need of a drummer, and Boone suggested Jan Buchner, a part-timer with the Kingsmen who came at the recommendation of both Skip and Butler. Buchner, who went by the stagename Jan Carl, was the manager of the Bull's Head Inn, a small inn located in Bridgehampton on Long Island, and which he offered as a rehearsal space during the inn's winter closure. The band rehearsed at the Bull's Head for several weeks in December 1964 and January 1965, and they also played at local bars in Bridgehampton at night.

In late 1964 and early 1965, to keep earning money before his new band had earned a contract, Sebastian continued performing as a studio musician on other artists' recordings. In this period, he played harmonica on progressive folk records for several acts, including Fred Neil, Jesse Colin Young and Judy Collins. (Note: Sebastian played harmonica on Vince Martin and Neil's 1964 album Tear Down the Walls and on several 1965 albums, including Neil's Bleecker & MacDougal, Young's Young Blood and Collins's Fifth Album.) In January 1965, the musician Bob Dylan asked Sebastian to play bass guitar on his newest album, Bringing It All Back Home. The album's first day of sessions, January 13, featured only Dylan on an acoustic guitar and, for a few tracks, Sebastian playing bass guitar, but none of the recordings were used on the final album. (Note: According to the Dylan researcher Olof Björner, Sebastian played bass on unused takes of "Love Minus Zero/No Limit" and "She Belongs To Me" and harmonica on "Outlaw Blues". The recordings were officially released on the 2015 album The Cutting Edge 1965–1966.) Dylan returned the next day to re-record much of the material, rearranging the songs attempted the day before so they instead featured an electric backing. Dylan invited Sebastian to return for a separate session held that evening, in which they recorded a remake of the song "Subterranean Homesick Blues". Boone – one of the few people Sebastian knew with a car and driver's license – offered to drive him to the session. Sebastian was not a trained bass player and, after struggling to play the part, he suggested that Boone play instead, but neither musician's contributions ended up on the final album. (Note: Later authors have sometimes doubted that there was an evening session on the 14th, but AFM records indicate Sebastian and Boone were present for a three-hour session. The pair are in photographs of the session taken by the photographer Daniel Kramer.)

==== First live dates ====
We were still trying to come up with a name when I ran into Fritz Richmond, a friend and musician. I asked him for suggestions. Fritz asked what we sounded like. I said a cross between Chuck Berry and Mississippi John Hurt. Fritz suggested the Lovin' Spoonful, a line from Hurt's 1963 song "Coffee Blues." The name was perfect.

— John Sebastian, 2016

In early 1965, in preparation for their first public performances, Sebastian, Yanovsky, Boone and Carl continued rehearsing at the Bull's Head, while Sebastian and Yanovsky searched for a group name. Fritz Richmond, the washtub bass player for the Jim Kweskin Jug Band, suggested to Sebastian the name the Lovin' Spoonful, a reference to the lyrics of the song "Coffee Blues" by the country blues musician Mississippi John Hurt, with whom Sebastian had previously worked. Sebastian and Yanovsky were enthusiastic about the suggestion and adopted it as the band's name.

Joe Marra, the owner of Greenwich Village's Night Owl Cafe, knew Sebastian from his time backing other artists at the club, and Marra offered to book the Spoonful at the venue. The Night Owl was formerly an after-hours bowling alley at West 3rd and MacDougal Streets, which Marra had recently converted into a 125-person capacity coffeehouse and restaurant for folk music acts. The band made their first live performances in late January 1965 at the Night Owl, holding a two-week residency. One show, which Jacobsen recorded on a tape recorder, featured a mixture of Sebastian's originals ("Good Time Music" and "Didn't Want to Have to Do It"), folk songs ("Wild About My Lovin'" and "My Gal") and rock and roll ("Route 66", "Alley Oop" and "Almost Grown"). (Note: Decades later, the recording was considered for release on CD as Live at the Night Owl, but Sebastian rejected the idea. The recording has since circulated as a bootleg.) The band received a mixed reception, due in part to their loud playing style in the small venue. Marra was unimpressed and returned to booking folk acts. Cavallo and Jacobsen recommended rehearsals and that the band replace Carl as drummer. Carl, who was six years older than his bandmates, clashed with them in terms of appearance and playing style, and he was subsequently fired by the band's management.

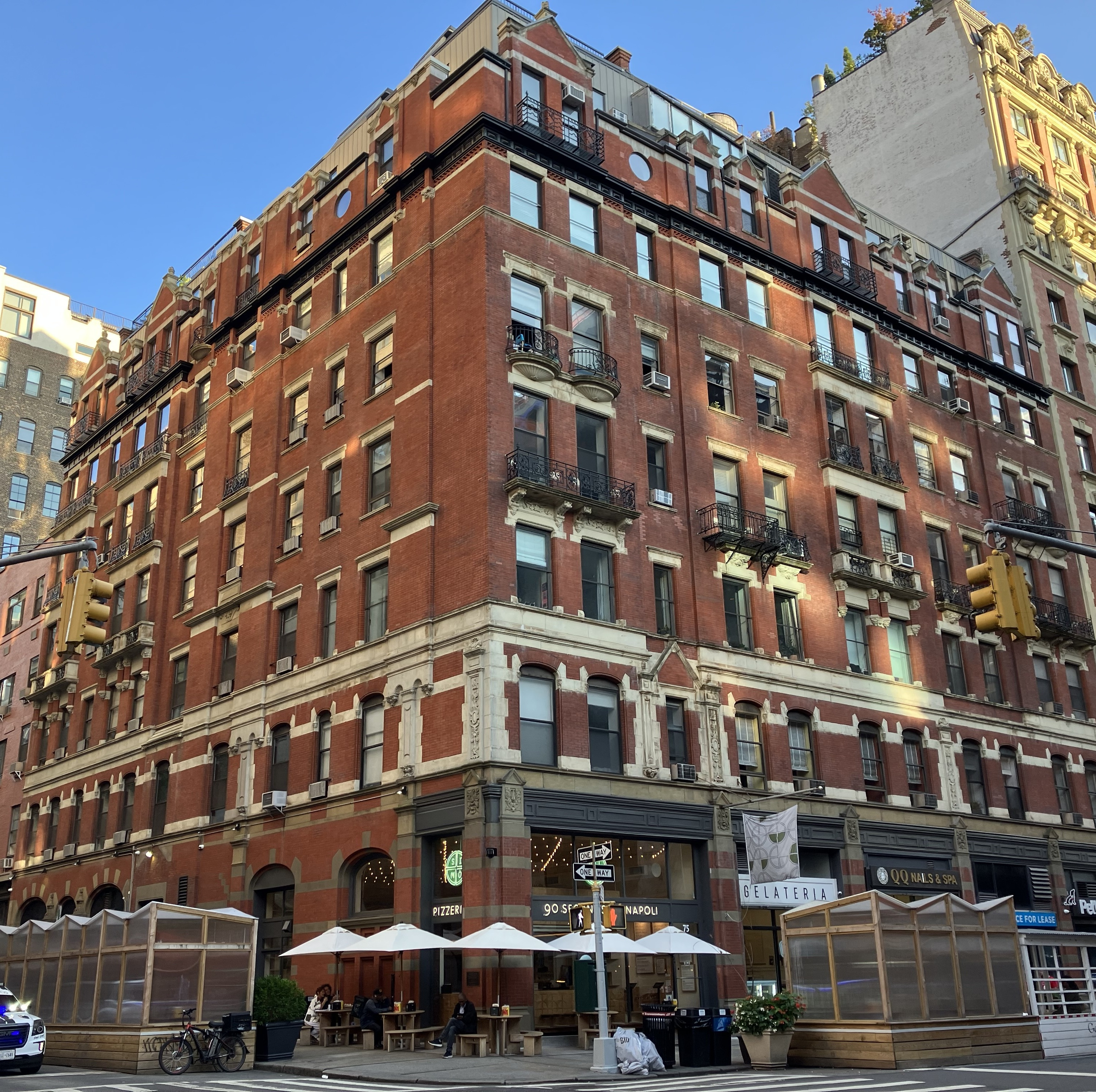
In early 1965, the band rehearsed for weeks in the dilapidated basement of Greenwich Village's Hotel Albert (pictured 2023). Joe Butler later said, "It inspired us, because it made us frightened of poverty".

Having fired Carl, the Spoonful could no longer play at the Bull's Head and were in need of a new rehearsal space. The band had little money and had been living with Elliot in her Village apartment at the Hotel Albert. The Albert was frequented by many local folk musicians, and the building's proprietors allowed musicians staying there to rehearse in its basement, a decaying space with standing pools of water, chipping walls and a bug infestation. While at the Albert, the band befriended one of the building's permanent residents, Butchie Webber, who often fed them meals. Though the two were not romantic, Webber married Sebastian, so as to prevent him from being drafted into fighting in the Vietnam War. Butler, who still played drums for the Sellouts, auditioned for the Spoonful in the Albert's basement. He impressed the others when he broke a drumstick but continued performing by hitting the cymbal with his hand, cutting it in the process. The band were inspired by Butler's energy and hired him as their drummer.

While waiting to be signed to a record label, the Spoonful played at night clubs on MacDougal Street in Greenwich Village, including Cafe Wha? and Café Bizarre. The band held a brief residency at Café Bizarre, playing several sets a night for six days a week, leading Sebastian to later reflect, "We learned more at that crappy little club than almost any other gig." Marra had been especially critical of the band's earlier performances at the Night Owl, but he was impressed by the band's newly professional approach, and in May 1965, he offered for the band to return to performing at the Night Owl. The Spoonful shared their bill at the club with two other electric groups whom Marra booked, Danny Kalb's band the Blues Project and the Modern Folk Quartet, the latter of which Sebastian sometimes filled in for on drums. The Night Owl's triple-bill was immediately successful, and other established acts sometimes came to watch, including members of the American band the Byrds and Mary Travers of the folk-trio Peter, Paul and Mary. Around the time he began booking electric acts, Marra moved the venue's stage towards the front street-facing window to draw in passers-by, and he printed a large color photo of the Spoonful and placed it in the club's window, which helped elevate the band's local popularity.

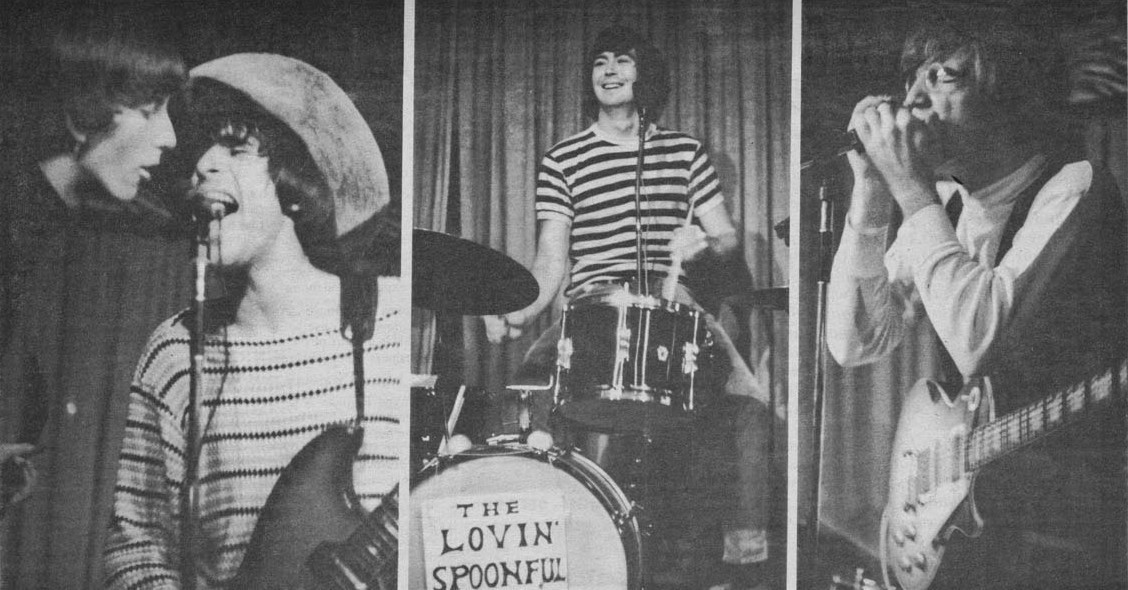
The Spoonful performing live, 1965

On June 7 and 8, 1965, the Spoonful performed at Club 47, a folk music club in Cambridge, Massachusetts. Boone remembered feeling hesitant to perform at a club known strictly for folk music, but Sebastian recalled that he and Yanovsky were immediately enthusiastic at the prospect of challenging folk enthusiasts: "Did we want to kill in that room! ... We were going to be face to face with the folkies at last." The band played at the venue at the suggestion of Fritz Richmond, who encouraged the group by pointing to Bob Dylan's recent transition to electrified rock, first heard three months earlier with the release of "Subterranean Homesick Blues", and the newfound popularity of the Byrds, whose folk rock cover of Dylan's song "Mr. Tambourine Man" reached number one in North America that month. The term "folk rock" had been coined in the June 12 issue of the American music magazine Billboard by the journalist Eliot Tiegel, who used the term principally to describe the music of the Byrds. Tiegel also counted "the Living Spoonfull" [sic] as an act working in the New York area with "a folk-rock sound", even though the group had not yet released a record. (Note: Boone later reflected that he and his bandmates had mixed feelings about the success of the Byrds, something they found encouraging but also disappointing because it meant that another group had beaten them in breaking the new folk-rock sound into the charts.)

The Spoonful performed two sets at Club 47 and initially received a mixed reception; many folk fans walked out of the first set due to the band's loud sound. Years later, Sebastian recalled a moment from the first set:

[This woman] carefully [got my] and Zally's attention, points out toward the amplifier, and puts her fingers in her ears. And Zally gave her his broadest and most affectionate smile, and turned his amplifier up as loud as he could. That was a real transition.

During the second set, the band received a warm response from the remaining crowd. In retrospect, the author Richie Unterberger describes the Spoonful's appearance as a "watershed" moment in the history of folk rock. The rock journalist Paul Williams attended the shows, and his review of the performances for the magazine Folkin' Around marked his earliest work as a music writer. Williams later reflected, "For a band like that to come to Club 47 was revolutionary, in terms of Cambridge['s] holier-than-thou purist attitude about folk music."

==== "Do You Believe in Magic", Kama Sutra ====
The beginning of "Do You Believe in Magic"
A lyrical celebration of the Spoonful's changing audience, "Do You Believe in Magic" was one of the first folk-rock hits. The song blends influences from Motown, jug band and folk music.

Early in the Spoonful's May residency at the Night Owl, Sebastian wrote a new song, "Do You Believe in Magic", which explored the transformative power of music. His initial inspiration came during one of the band's performances, in which he and Yanovsky noticed a sixteen-year-old girl dancing among the audience. The girl stood in contrast to the older beatnik crowd who typically attended folk performances, and Sebastian recalled that "[she was] dancing like we danced – and not like the last generation danced". He also remembered: "Zal and I just elbowed each other the entire night, because to us, that young girl symbolized the fact that our audience was changing, that maybe they had finally found us." Sebastian composed the song the following night, and the band worked together at the Albert to finish its arrangement.

The Spoonful was enthusiastic about "Do You Believe in Magic" and hoped to record a demo of the song to flog to record companies. In June 1965, Jacobsen fronted a session with his own money at Bell Sound Studios in New York, where the band recorded "Do You Believe in Magic" and several other songs. (Note: Which other songs were on the demo is disputed. Boone and the journalist Ben Edmonds each write it was "Wild About My Lovin'" and an electric arrangement "Younger Girl", but Jacobsen suggested it only included "On the Road Again".) Jacobsen invited Yester to participate in the session, adding both piano and backing vocals, and the session musician Gary Chester played tambourine. Jacobsen and Cavallo brought an acetate disc of the demo to numerous record labels, all of which turned down an opportunity to sign the band. After attending one of the Spoonful's performances at the Night Owl, Phil Spector, a well-known producer, listened to an acetate of "Do You Believe in Magic" and considered signing the band to his label, Philles Records. Recollections differ as to who turned whom down, but subsequent authors suggest that in writing their own music and possessing a defined sound, the Spoonful differed greatly from the acts with which Spector normally worked. (Note: Henry Diltz of the Modern Folk Quartet later said, "The word was that [Spector] really wanted the Lovin' Spoonful, but he couldn't get them", and Sebastian said in a 1966 interview that the band turned Spector down "because we didn't want to be swallowed up under his name". In his autobiography, Boone instead said "I don't think we turned [Spector] down flat ... but we decided to play hard-to-get for a little while longer". The producer Vini Poncia recalled that Spector "was considering them but passed on it".)

Elektra Records approached the Spoonful and offered to sign them. Elektra regularly produced acts from Greenwich Village, including the Even Dozen Jug Band and the Paul Butterfield Blues Band. The label's offer would have allowed the Spoonful to retain Jacobsen as their producer and Cavallo as their manager, but the band worried that Elektra had not been successful at issuing singles in the pop market, and that they would not be clearly identified as a rock act if they signed at a folk-oriented label. Cavallo approached Paul Rothchild and Jac Holzman of Elektra and said the band needed an advance of $10,000 before they could sign (equivalent to US$102,000 in 2025). Holzman initially refused due to the large figure, but he soon changed his mind and offered the band a deal, by which point they had signed elsewhere. The band instead signed a side-deal with Elektra, which had them record four songs, including Sebastian's song "Good Time Music". Jacobsen later said that the band offered the songs to Elektra out of guilt, since "We had kind of hung [Holzman] out to dry just a little bit ... [so we] allowed him to have those sides. The label later included the four songs on the compilation album What's Shakin', released the following year.

The Spoonful signed with Koppelman-Rubin, an entertainment company, who signed the band to Kama Sutra Records in June 1965. As part of the deal, MGM Records distributed the records, which Kama Sutra released for Koppelman-Rubin. The arrangement's format of multiple middlemen left little in profits for the band. Sebastian later said that not signing with Elektra was "the worst decision I ever made in my life".

Kama Sutra saw no need to re-record Jacobsen's original demo of the Spoonful performing "Do You Believe in Magic", and the label pressed copies to be the band's debut single. The label issued it in the US on July 20, 1965, and it debuted on the Billboard Hot 100 a month later, remaining on the chart for thirteen weeks and peaking in October at number nine.

=== 1965–1966: American popularity ===
==== Touring, debut album ====
We were in a rented Cadillac riding in from the Los Angeles airport toward Hollywood ... when we heard "[Do You Believe in] Magic" on the radio for the first time. We were all jumping up and down, punching each other and screaming ... We had to pull the car over. We were hyperventilating with excitement and validation and joy.

— Joe Butler, 2000

The release of "Do You Believe in Magic" in July 1965 propelled the Spoonful to nationwide fame in the US within weeks. The band made their American television debut on the channel 10 show of the Miami disc jockey Rick Shaw, and they also taped appearances for the TV programs American Bandstand, The Merv Griffin Show and The Lloyd Thaxton Show. In conjunction with the release of the single, the band's management made plans for their first series of serious live dates outside of New York City. Beginning in August, the band toured the West Coast of the United States. In San Francisco, the band held a two-week residency at Mother's Nightclub, which then advertised itself as the "world's first psychedelic nightclub", and on August 7, they performed in-front of 35,000 at the Rose Bowl in Pasadena, California, as one of several support acts for the English pop group Herman's Hermits, alongside the Turtles and the Bobby Fuller Four. In Los Angeles, the Spoonful played at several clubs on the Sunset Strip, including Ciro's, the Whisky a Go Go and Crescendo Tiger's Tail (later renamed The Trip). After returning to New York, the Spoonful supported the Motown Revue over ten days of performances, from September 3 to 12.

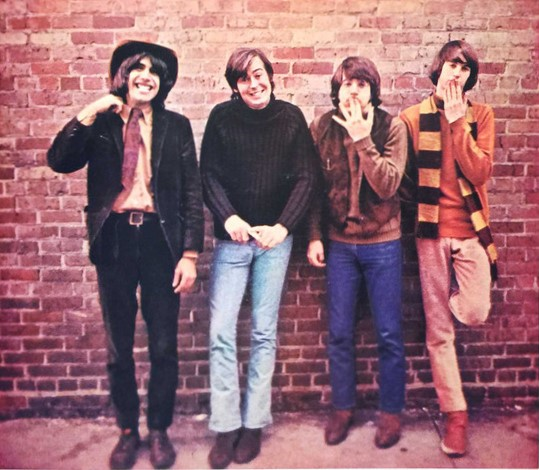
The Spoonful in a promotional photograph taken by Henry Diltz, 1965

In October 1965, the Spoonful returned to the West Coast, where their image and sound proved influential in the emerging San Francisco scene, particularly in the city's Haight-Ashbury district, a center of the 1960s counterculture. They were the first rock group to play at the hungry i, one of the most prominent clubs in America's folk-music scene. During their one-week run, they were seen by Ralph J. Gleason, jazz critic for the San Francisco Chronicle. In his review of their first show, Gleason described the band's music and clothing as "the expression of a new age" and "an expression of freedom". He concluded the band was "vital and alive and, I believe, important". On October 24, the Spoonful headlined a dance party at the Longshoreman's Union Hall in the city's Fisherman's Wharf neighborhood. Organized by the concert-production collective Family Dog Productions, the event combined rock music with light shows and psychedelic drugs, and it was among the earliest events of its kind in San Francisco; Jacobsen reflected, "That whole idea of going and listening to music and getting high started there". In attendance at the Longshoreman's show were members of the Grateful Dead, an acoustic-folk group, who were inspired by the Spoonful's performance to similarly "go electric" in their style. (Note: The Grateful Dead had performed as a jug band since their formation in May 1965, but seeing the Spoonful's show inspired them to transition to amplified instruments. Their first recording session with electric instruments was ten days later, on November 3. That month, for their first photo session, they adopted similar clothing to the Spoonful.)

Amid their touring schedule, the Spoonful recorded tracks for their debut album, Do You Believe in Magic. (Note: Around this time, the band also performed as uncredited studio musicians on Sonny & Cher's single "But You're Mine", released in late 1965.) The band recorded thirteen songs across several sessions between June and September 1965, mostly at Bell Sound in New York, and they also recorded at RCA Studios in Hollywood, Los Angeles. The band's focus was on recording as quickly as possible, and a majority of the songs were jug band and blues covers taken from their typical live set list. The album's five original compositions were all credited to Sebastian, including "Did You Ever Have to Make Up Your Mind?", which he based on a experience as a child at summer camp when he fell in love with twin sisters. Pointing to the success of the Beatles and the Byrds, the Spoonful's label encouraged the band to trade lead vocal responsibilities; on Do You Believe in Magic, Sebastian sings lead on most songs, but Butler also sings twice ("You Baby" and "The Other Side of This Life") as does Yanovsky ("Blues in the Bottle", "On the Road Again" and the unreleased "Alley Oop"). The album first went on sale on October 23, 1965, when the band held an autograph session in Pleasant Hill, California, and Kama Sutra issued the album nationwide in November. It debuted on the Billboard Top LPs chart on December 4, and it initially ran on the chart for 19 weeks, peaking in February 1966 at number 71.

By late 1965, the Spoonful had made appearances on the most popular American television variety shows, including Where the Action Is, Shindig! and Hullabaloo. Executives from NBC approached Cavallo and offered the band the opportunity to star in their own television series, The Monkees. The executives Bob Rafelson and Bert Schneider met with the band in Manhattan and explained their idea for a comedy sitcom about a band seeking to make it big, styled similarly to the Beatles' 1964 film, A Hard Day's Night. Though excited at the prospect of being propelled quickly to a national audience, the band were unenthusiastic at the idea of having to change their name to The Monkees and were worried that their ability to create and play their own music would be limited by the venture. They declined the offer. Rafelson later said that the Spoonful was the only existing group considered for the show before they began auditioning individual actors and musicians in September 1965.

==== Daydream ====
In November 1965, the Spoonful embarked on a 19-day package-tour with the American girl group the Supremes. The acts performed at colleges across the southern US, beginning in Lafayette, Louisiana, on November 10. Both acts traveled by bus and partied together, along with members of the Supremes' backing band, the Funk Brothers, billed as the Earl Van Dyke Orchestra. The Spoonful generally enjoyed the tour but found it physically exhausting. Sebastian additionally missed his girlfriend, Loretta "Lorey" Kaye. Near the tour's end, in an effort to raise his own spirits, he composed "Daydream" while riding on the bus through North Carolina, drawing inspiration from the Supremes' 1964 singles "Baby Love" and "Where Did Our Love Go". A stop in Savannah, Georgia, inspired the beginnings of "Jug Band Music", which Boone later said "recalled pleasant visions of the tour" for him and his bandmates.

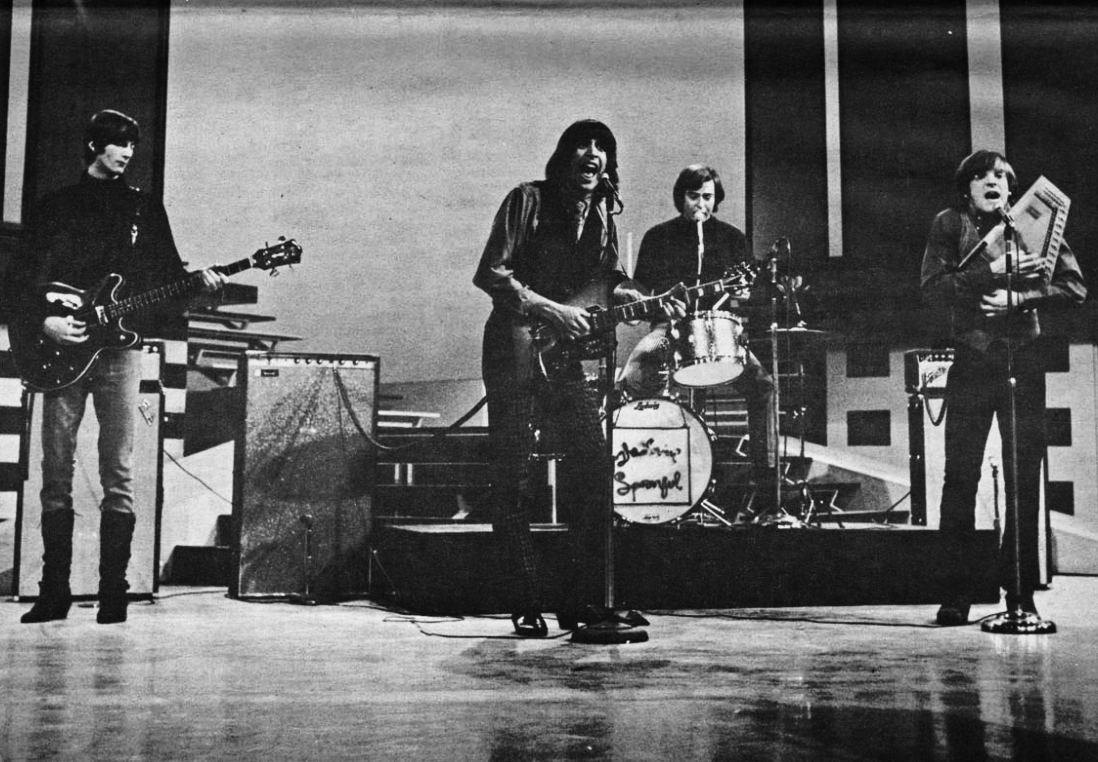
The Spoonful performing for The Big T.N.T. Show, November 1965

At the conclusion of their tour with the Supremes, the Spoonful departed directly for Los Angeles, having been invited by Phil Spector to appear in the concert film The Big T.N.T. Show. After filming on 29–30 November, the band remained in Los Angeles to do several weeks of a residency at the Trip, a short-lived nightclub on Sunset Boulevard, where Brian Wilson of the Beach Boys saw them perform. During their stay, the Spoonful befriended a local fashion designer, Jeannie Franklyn, who subsequently designed custom-clothing for Yanovsky. They also struck up a friendship with David Crosby, the rhythm guitarist of the Byrds. Crosby had spoken favorably of the Spoonful in interviews as early as August, often promising reporters that they would be the next big group. Both he and his bandmate Jim McGuinn had been familiar with Sebastian and Yanovsky since their earlier years playing folk with Cass Elliot, and the Spoonful, the Byrds and the Mamas & the Papas remained on close terms in the mid-1960s. (Note: The Mamas & the Papas later chronicled the origins of the three groups in their single "Creeque Alley", which reached number five in the US in June 1967.)

Amid their busy TV and live-date schedule, the Spoonful recorded most of their second album Daydream in four days, from December 13 to 16, at Bell Sound Studios in New York City. Some songs for the album were recorded in November, including "You Didn't Have to Be So Nice", and additional sessions took place at Columbia Studios in New York City and RCA Studios in Hollywood, California. Boone began "You Didn't Have to Be So Nice" as a verse and a basic melodic figure, and Sebastian collaborated with him to complete the song. Kama Sutra issued the song as a non-album single on November 13, and it peaked at number ten on the Billboard Hot 100 in January 1966. The sessions for Daydream came ten weeks after the band finished their first album, and the band had had little time to rehearse new material. Owing to the constraints, they recorded some Sebastian compositions which Jacobsen had rejected for inclusion on their debut album, including "Didn't Want to Have to Do It" and "Warm Baby". While Do You Believe in Magic contained just five original compositions, eleven out of twelve tracks on Daydream were original. Kama Sutra released the album in March 1966 and it reached number ten on the Billboard Top LPs chart, making it the band's best performing studio album.

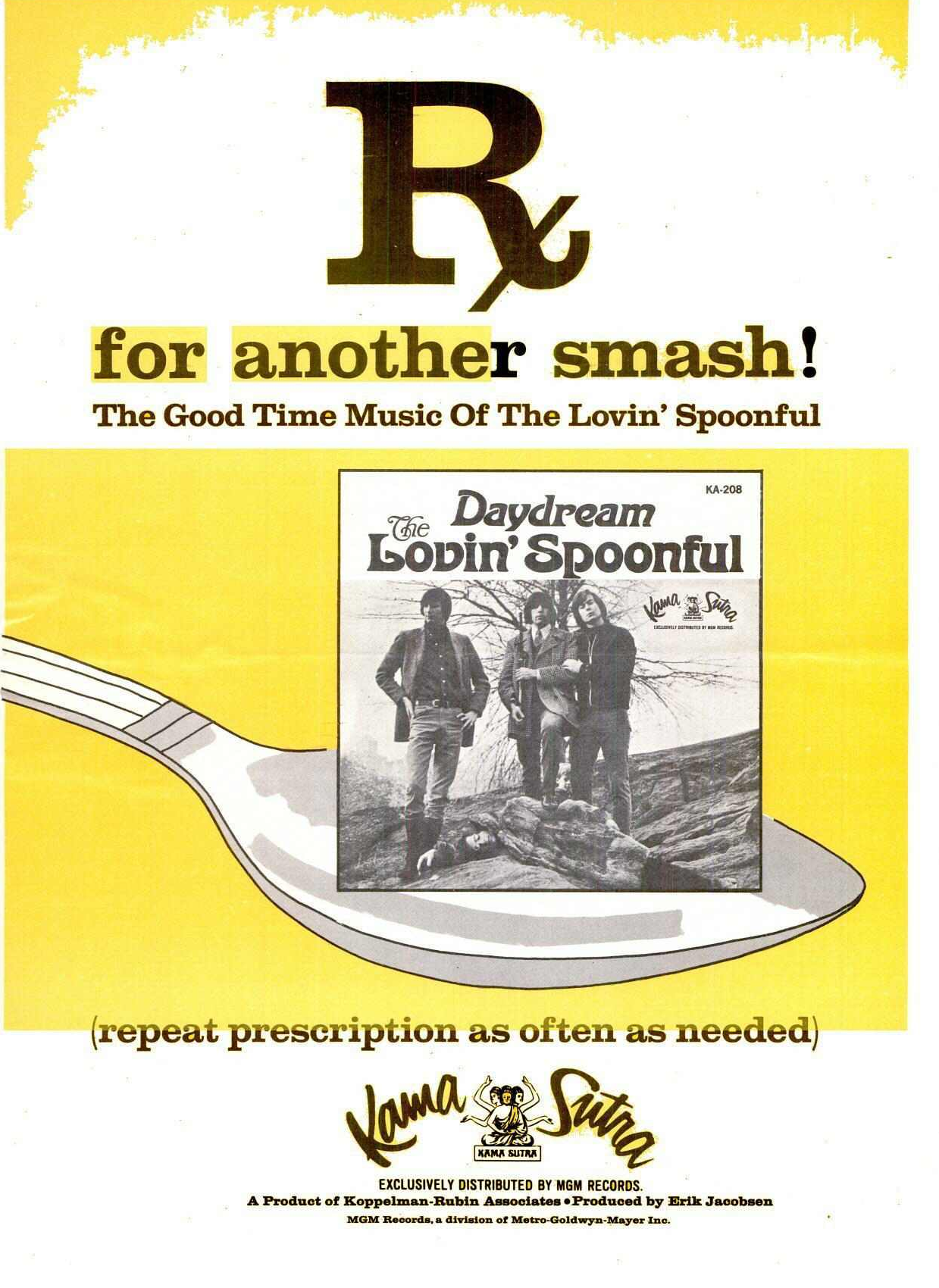
Kama Sutra Records' trade ad for the "Daydream" single fueled press speculation that the band's name alluded to drug use.

Of the songs recorded for Daydream, Sebastian and Yanovsky hoped that their joint composition "It's Not Time Now" would be issued as a single, but Kama Sutra denied the request out of fear that it was a protest song. The label instead issued "Daydream" in February 1966. The song's release fueled speculation from the press and public about a link between the band and drug use, as the press had often incorrectly speculated that the Lovin' Spoonful alluded to the spoon used in injecting heroin. The increased speculation was partly driven by the lyrics' use of the term "dream", which by 1966 was sometimes used to connote the experience of taking psychedelic drugs. Additionally, a trade ad in Billboard accompanying the single's release made several drug allusions, drawing the ire of the band, who had regularly sought to distance themselves from drug associations.

"Daydream" remained on the Hot 100 for twelve weeks, peaking at number two for two weeks in mid-April. The single was kept from the top spot on Billboard's chart by the Righteous Brothers' song "(You're My) Soul and Inspiration", but it reached number one on Cash Box magazine's chart and also reached the top spot in Canada. The song's success expanded the Spoonful's popularity such that they were often able to headline their concerts rather than perform as a support act. When the band toured the American South with the Beach Boys from April 1 to 9, 1966, the two groups alternated top billing. (Note: Brian Wilson stopped regularly touring with the Beach Boys in December 1964, but he saw the Spoonful perform at The Trip. Wilson later said that "a John Sebastian song I had been listening to" inspired his song "God Only Knows", which the biographer Mark Dillon connects to "You Didn't Have to Be So Nice".)

=== 1966: International popularity ===
==== What's Up, Tiger Lily? soundtrack; European tour ====
Though the Spoonful had achieved quick success in North America, they remained generally unknown in the UK. None of their singles had charted in the country. (Note: "Do You Believe in Magic" was issued in the UK on October 1, 1965, but its performance was hindered by the release of a similar-sounding cover by an English band, the Pack. Another English band, the Boston Crabs, covered "You Didn't Have to Be So Nice" around the time the original was issued in the UK in January 1966.) To expand the band's popularity to an international audience, their management organized several live- and TV-dates in England and Sweden for April 1966. Only days before the Spoonful was set to depart to Europe, they were approached to provide a soundtrack for What's Up, Tiger Lily?, the directorial debut of the comedian Woody Allen, who knew the band from his work at clubs in Greenwich Village. The band recorded the soundtrack in two days, April 11 and 12, at National Recording Studios in New York City, and they made a brief appearance in the film. The film was a commercial disappointment and received mixed reviews. Issued in August 1966, the soundtrack album reached number 126 on the Billboard LPs chart. Jacobsen later criticized the project as a "goofball album" which distracted the band and stalled their progress.

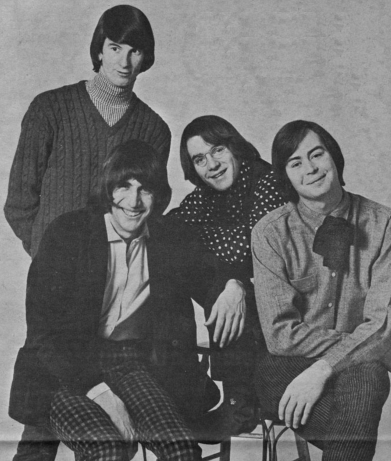
The Spoonful in a 1966 promotional photograph

On April 12, the Spoonful arrived at Heathrow Airport to begin their ten-day tour of England and Sweden. Problems which arose during negotiations with the British Musicians' Union forced the band to limit the number of appearances they made in Britain. In the tour's first week, the band played concerts in Birmingham and Manchester, appeared on the television programs Top of the Pops, Ready Steady Go! and Thank Your Lucky Stars, played on BBC Radio and attended a party at the London home of the Irish socialite Tara Browne. The band's time in England allowed them to interact with many of Britain's top musicians. On April 18, they performed an invite-only show at the Marquee Club on Wardour Street, Soho, central London. Several of Britain's top performers were in attendance, including John Lennon, George Harrison, Ray Davies, Brian Jones, Steve Winwood, Spencer Davis and Eric Clapton. The band were warmly received, and Lennon and Harrison joined them afterwards into the morning at The May Fair Hotel in Piccadilly. The next night, following their performance at the Blaises Club in Kensington, the band befriended Jones as well.

After flying to Stockholm to perform on Swedish television, the Spoonful proceeded to Ireland to attend the 21st-birthday celebration of Browne on April 23. Browne, who then regarded the Spoonful as his favorite band, delayed his party by seven weeks in order to coincide with the band's touring and recording schedule. Browne flew the band to Ireland at his own expense to perform a private show, paying them US$10,000 for the performance (equivalent to US$99,000 in 2025). Held at the Luggala Estate, a Gothic Revival house in the Wicklow Mountains, the party was attended by many prominent Swinging London figures, including members of the Rolling Stones, Peter Bardens, Anita Pallenberg, Chrissie Shrimpton, John Paul Getty Jr., Rupert Lycett Green and Mike McCartney. Butler recalled that the band's performance was likely substandard, since they were all drunk and high on marijuana. Several guests also partook in the drug LSD, including Butler, and the Spoonful stayed overnight.

The Spoonful flew back to the US on April 24, and reports soon followed that they planned to return later in the year for more British shows. The band's morale was high following the April tour, particularly after they had been treated as equals by contemporary performers whom they held in high regard. "Daydream" became a major international hit; by mid-May, it had reached number two on all of the major British singles charts and number one on the Swedish Kvällstoppen chart.

==== Marijuana bust ====
On May 20, 1966, Boone and Yanovsky were arrested in San Francisco for possessing marijuana, then an illegal drug. Police discovered the marijuana after pulling the pair over and searching their vehicle. Boone and Yanovsky spent the night in jail before being bailed out the following morning by the Spoonful's road manager, Rich Chiaro. Cavallo and Charley Koppelman flew out to meet the band to begin managing the situation, and they hired Melvin Belli to be their attorney. Sebastian and Butler were not immediately informed of the nature of the bust, and the band's May 21 performance at the University of California, Berkeley's Greek Theatre went forward as normal.

We were the first big rock band to get busted for weed. There was no playbook in effect. The record company, the management company – they didn't have an operating procedure for what you do, especially if one of your members has an immigration issue.

— Steve Boone, 2018

At a meeting with San Francisco police and the District Attorney, Yanovsky was threatened with deportation back to his native Canada. Belli expressed that Yanovsky and Boone were unlikely to win on the merits of their case and that their only way to avoid charges was to cooperate with authorities. The two initially balked at the idea, but they relented to avoid Yanovsky being deported, something they expected would lead to a breakup of the band. Yanovsky and Boone cooperated with authorities to name their drug source, directing an undercover operative to their source at a local party. In exchange, all charges were dropped, their arrest records were expunged, the two did not need to appear in court and there was no publicity related to their arrest. Their drug source was in turn arrested and served a brief jail sentence.

After the drug case went to court in December 1966, knowledge of Yanovsky and Boone's bust became more widespread. The underground press was especially critical of the band. By early 1967, the Spoonful's shows on the West Coast were sometimes picketed by members of the '60s counterculture. Protesters carried signs which accused the band of being "finks" and traitors to the movement, and they encouraged fans to boycott the band and burn their records. The public revelations of the drug bust added to tensions between Sebastian and Butler on the one hand, and Yanovsky and Boone on the other. Boone later suggested that the boycott hurt the band's commercial performance, but the author Richie Unterberger suggests that the effects have likely been overestimated by other authors, since "most of the people who bought Spoonful records were average teenage Americans, not hippies". In an article recounting the June 1967 Monterey International Pop Festival, the author Michael Lydon suggested that the Spoonful was unable to appear at the festival due to complications related to the drug bust.

==== "Summer in the City" ====
The end of the first bridge of "Summer in the City"
The Spoonful's only number one record, "Summer in the City" features a harder rock style than the band's previous output.

After having recorded two albums in the second-half of 1965, the Spoonful was stretched for new material in March 1966 when they began sessions for a new single. While searching for inspiration, Sebastian recalled a song composed and informally recorded by his fourteen-year-old brother, Mark. Sebastian reworked the lyrics and melody of his younger brother's composition into "Summer in the City", and he also incorporated contributions from Boone and the session musician Artie Schroeck. Kama Sutra did not issue "Summer in the City" immediately but instead repurposed "Did You Ever Have to Make Up Your Mind?" for release as a single. (Note: Quality Records released "Did You Ever Have to Make Up Your Mind?" as a single in December 1965 in select Canadian cities to test its potential performance in the American market. It initially reached number ten in Canada in February 1966, reaching number six that July after it was issued across the country.) Issued in April, "Did You Ever Have to Make Up Your Mind?" reached number two on the Billboard Hot 100 in June, making it the band's fourth top ten single in America and their second top two record in a row. (Note: Quality Records issued "Jug Band Music" as a single exclusively in Canada, where it reached number two in June 1966. "Bald Headed Lena" reached number one on Sweden's Tio i Topp chart that July.) That same month, Do You Believe in Magic re-entered the Top LPs chart, peaking in August at number 32 after spending 16 more weeks on the chart.

In June 1966, while in Los Angeles to play at the Golden Bear nightclub and support the Beach Boys at the Hollywood Bowl, the Spoonful held a party to debut their newest single. "Summer in the City" was released on July 4. One month later, it overtook the Troggs' "Wild Thing" and became the band's first and only number one single in the US. It held the position for three weeks, becoming what the author Jon Savage terms the "American song of the summer". The song also topped Cash Box and Record World's charts, and it was number one in Canada. The musicologist Ian MacDonald characterizes the song as a "cutting-edge pop [record]" and one of many "futuristic singles" to appear in 1966, representative of a time period when recorded songs began to employ sounds and effects difficult or impossible to recreate during a live performance; when the Spoonful played the song in concert, Sebastian was unable to both sing and play the piano part simultaneously, and Butler instead performed lead vocal duties. After "Daydream" reached number two in the UK, expectations were similarly high for "Summer in the City", but it failed to enter the top five of the British charts; it instead peaked at number eight on the Record Retailer chart. Coincident with the single's release, the band reiterated their plans for a second tour of Britain and continental Europe, to be held over two weeks in September and October with the English singer Dusty Springfield. Only weeks before it began, the band withdrew from the tour. (Note: Paul Williams wrote that the Spoonful opted to delay their appearance after "Summer in the City" failed to enter the top five in the UK. Asked for comment by Disc and Music Echo magazine, the talent manager Tito Burns said that negotiations for the Spoonful's appearance broke down over "a terrible misunderstanding". Dan Moriarty, the band's publicist, told Disc that the band had to delay the tour after sessions for their album Hums were delayed.) As they announced their withdrawal, the band announced plans to return to Britain in April 1967 for a three-week tour.

In July 1966, the Spoonful played to a crowd of 65,000 at that year's Newport Folk Festival in Rhode Island. Bob Dylan had generated controversy at the previous year's festival when he performed a set of electric rock, but at the 1966 festival, the Spoonful and several other electric bands appeared, including Howlin' Wolf, Chuck Berry and the Blues Project. The Spoonful was well received and received no pushback over their appearance. In an article recounting the festival for The New York Times, the critic Robert Shelton suggested that the band's warm reception "reflected the growing acceptance of folk-rock and other amalgamations of contemporary folk songs with electric instruments".

==== Hums of the Lovin' Spoonful ====
Sessions for the Spoonful's third studio album, later released as Hums of the Lovin' Spoonful, were originally booked for Columbia Records' 7th Avenue studio in New York from August 16 to September 23, 1966. Recording was delayed after Columbia booked its own artists at the studio. When time allowed them a break from touring, the Spoonful recorded the album across several sessions in New York City at Bell Sound and the 7th Avenue studio, with work also done in Los Angeles. For the first time on one of the band's albums, it consisted of only original material. Henry Diltz, a member of the Modern Folk Quartet, contributed clarinet to "Bes' Friends" and took the pictures which adorned the LP's sleeve. The album was released in November 1966, and it reached number 14 on the Billboard LPs chart. Preorders for the album were diminished after a disappointing reaction accompanied the August release of the What's Up, Tiger Lily? soundtrack album.

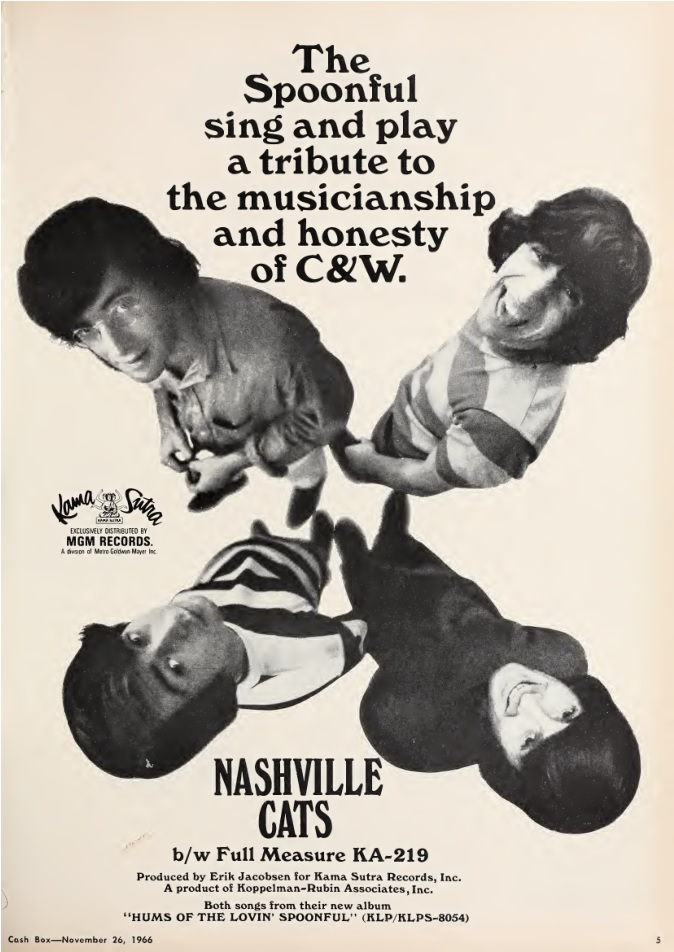
A trade ad for "Nashville Cats", the Spoonful's seventh and final single to reach the US Top Ten

In addition to the already-released "Summer in the City", the sessions for Hums of the Lovin' Spoonful produced the song "Rain on the Roof". The possibility of releasing the song as a single generated disagreement among the members of the Spoonful. "Summer in the City" featured a harder sound than their previous output, and it had attracted new fans to the group after it reached number one on the Billboard Hot 100 chart in August. Both Boone and Butler worried that returning to a softer sound with "Rain on the Roof" would potentially alienate the band's new fans, but Sebastian countered that the band ought to avoid releasing consecutive singles which sounded too similar, also contending that "Rain on the Roof" would add another dimension to their sound. Issued as a single in September, (Note: Later sources identify the release date as October 1966, but the October 7 issue of The Herald Statesman says the record came out "[l]ast week", indicating the week of September 26–30.) "Rain on the Roof" remained on the Hot 100 for ten weeks and peaked at number ten, making it the Spoonful's sixth consecutive single to reach the top ten. The song also continued the band's success in Europe, charting in several European countries. In their promotion of their latest singles, the band performed both "Rain on the Roof" and "Summer in the City" on the ABC variety show The Hollywood Palace, aired September 24.

Another song from Hums of the Lovin' Spoonful, the country-tinged "Nashville Cats", was issued as a single in late November 1966. It reached number eight on the Hot 100, but despite the band's hopes, it failed to crossover into the country market. The single's B-side, "Full Measure", a Boone-Sebastian collaboration, received strong airplay in California and the Southwestern United States, helping it reach number 87 on the Hot 100 chart. In KRLA Beat, the local publication of the Southern Californian radio station KRLA, "Full Measure" reached as high as number seven on the station's chart.

In 1966, the Spoonful had five Top Ten singles, making it the band's most successful year to date. The end-of-year issue for Billboard magazine ranked the Spoonful as the third best performing singles artist of the year, after the Beatles and the Rolling Stones. In the magazine's list of the top records of the year, it placed "Summer in the City", "Daydream" and "Did You Ever Have to Make Up Your Mind" at numbers 35, 38 and 48, respectively. (Note: The only other groups to have at least three singles on the list were the Beach Boys (three), Paul Revere & the Raiders (three) and the Beatles (four).) Besides achieving commercial success, the Spoonful in 1966 were among the American bands regarded most highly by critics; a piece in TIME magazine that October placed the band alongside the Mamas and the Papas and Simon & Garfunkel as one of the three best new groups in the country, and Ralph J. Gleason told Look magazine that the Spoonful were "the best group in the U.S.", adding he was "glad to be alive at a time when I can hear them".

=== 1967–1968: Diminished success ===
==== You're a Big Boy Now soundtrack; Yanovsky and Jacobsen fired ====
In mid-October 1966, the Spoonful recorded a soundtrack album for the 1966 film You're a Big Boy Now. The film served as the master's thesis of the director Francis Ford Coppola, who was then attending UCLA Film School. After meeting with Coppola in September to discuss the project, Sebastian wrote the songs on his own before presenting them to the musician Artie Schroeck, who arranged the compositions for an orchestra. After Butler struggled with the drum part, the session musician Bill LaVorgna played in his place. David "Fathead" Newman played saxophone during the sessions and Clark Terry played flügelhorn.

[Not working with the Spoonful anymore] was fine by me, because we had kind of run our course. We were falling apart.

— Erik Jacobsen, 2003

During the editing of You're a Big Boy Now, Coppola used the Mamas & the Papas' 1966 single "Monday, Monday" as temp music for one sequence in the film, for which Sebastian wrote "Darling Be Home Soon". Sebastian's composition flips a genre convention by describing a male subject waiting for a female to return home. The Spoonful recorded the song in one night, but Sebastian's original vocal track was subsequently wiped. Sebastian later attributed the loss to an accident on the part of an engineer, saying that what is heard on the final recording "is me, a half hour after learning that my original vocal track had been erased". He added: "You can even hear my voice quiver a little at the end. That was me thinking about the vocal we lost and wanting to kill someone." Boone instead suggests that Jacobsen deliberately erased Sebastian's vocal after finding it substandard; Boone recalled that the event marked the angriest he had ever seen Sebastian. In mid-October, Jacobsen publicly announced that he would no longer be producing the Spoonful. Boone suggests in retrospect that the vocal-erasure "probably played a major role" in Jacobsen's departure.

The lack of collaboration on You're a Big Boy Now led to consternation from Sebastian's bandmates, especially Yanovsky, whose playing style often relied on improvisation. Yanovsky especially disliked the soundtrack album's lead single, "Darling Be Home Soon", which was issued in early 1967. When the Spoonful appeared on The Ed Sullivan Show in January to promote the release, Yanovsky mugged for the camera, mimed the lyrics and bounced up-and-down with a rubber-toad figurine attached to his guitar. The appearance led to laughter from the audience and anger from Sebastian. "Darling Be Home Soon" peaked at number fifteen, a major disappointment compared to the band's earlier releases and their first single which failed to reach the Top Ten. Also disappointing was the release of the You're a Big Boy Now soundtrack, which peaked at number 160 on the Billboard Top LPs chart in May 1967. The album's sales were hampered by the release in March of the band's first greatest hits compilation, The Best of The Lovin' Spoonful, which reached number three and became the band's best selling album.

I wanted us to go back [to the clubs] and try to recapture that sort of energy ... I had told John [Sebastian] that I thought his songwriting [had] really gone down the toilet and I thought that ... it was time for him to get back into the "risk element".

— Zal Yanovsky, 1998

From late 1966 into early 1967, Sebastian's bandmates felt he was exerting excessive control over the band's direction. Boone recalled that the relationship between Sebastian and Yanovsky became especially stilted, since Yanovsky often rebelled rather than articulate his concerns directly. Further agitating the situation, when Koppelman and Rubin renegotiated the band's distribution deal between Kama Sutra and MGM in late 1966, though the band received an increase in pay, the label added a "key-man clause" which specified that the band would exist only if Sebastian was a member. Reports followed in July that the Spoonful's new contract with Kama Sutra ran until 1975 and had the band's compensation at seven figures.

In May 1967, Sebastian convened a meeting with Butler and Boone to discuss the band's future. Sebastian expressed frustration with Yanovsky's increasingly erratic public behavior and his derogatory treatment of his bandmates. Sebastian concluded that either Yanovsky should be fired, or else he was prepared to leave the band. Butler, who had never gotten along with Yanovsky and was increasingly the target of Yanovsky's insults, agreed with Sebastian. In a subsequent group meeting at Sebastian's apartment, the band informed Yanovsky that he had been fired. That June, rumors circulated that the band was breaking up. Yanovsky agreed to appear for the rest of the group's scheduled dates, and he last performed with the Spoonful on June 24, 1967, at the Forest Hills Music Festival in Queens, New York.

==== Yester hired, Everything Playing ====
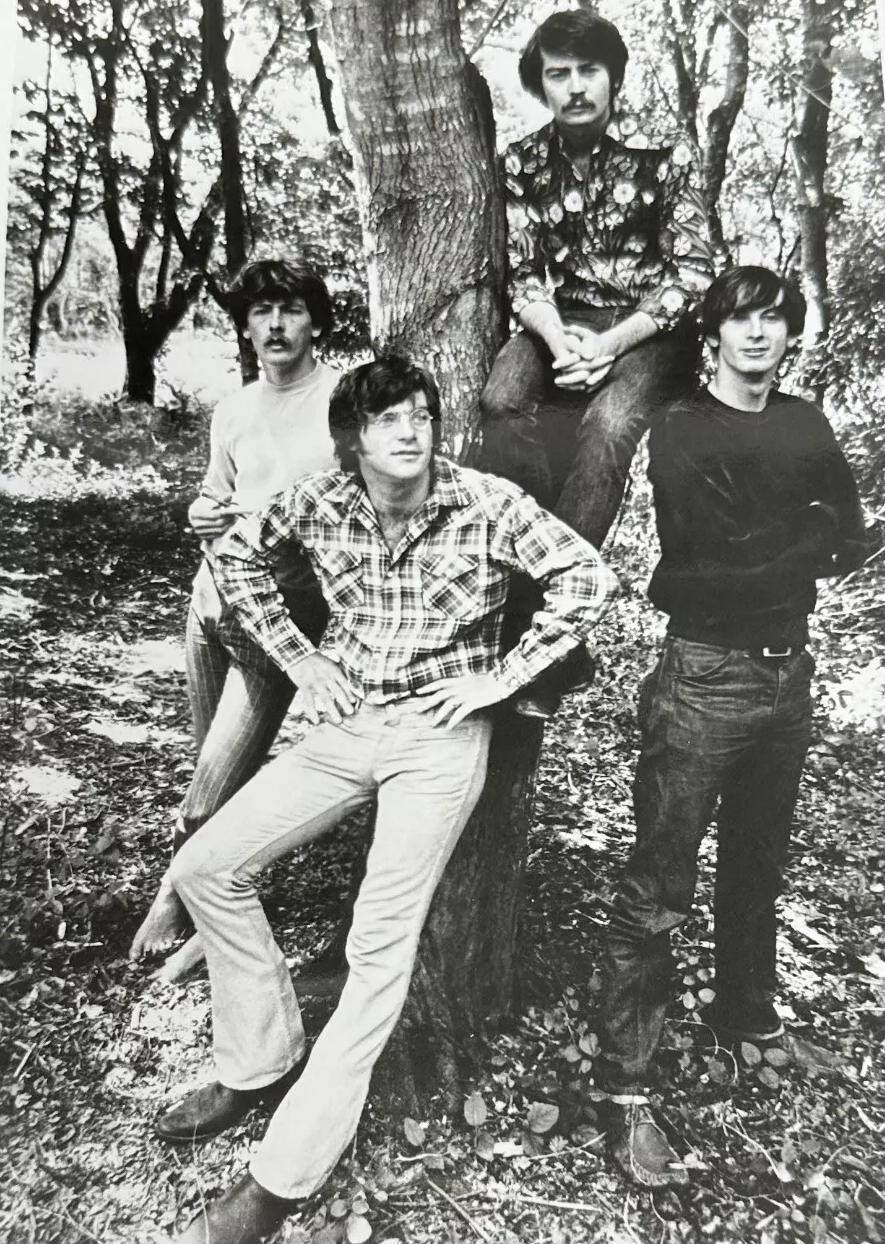
The Spoonful with Yanovsky's replacement, Jerry Yester (left), c. 1967–68

The Spoonful hired Jerry Yester to replace Yanovsky on lead guitar duties. Following the May 1967 meeting in which Yanovsky was fired, Sebastian suggested hiring Yester, and no other replacement was considered. Yester had been close to the band and Jacobsen for years, having contributed to the recording of "Do You Believe in Magic". Since mid-1966, when Yester's band the Modern Folk Quartet disbanded, he had been working as a session musician and producer in Los Angeles. (Note: Yester contributed to the Monkees' 1967 album Headquarters, and he produced the Association's 1966 album Renaissance and Tim Buckley's 1967 album Goodbye and Hello.) In early June 1967, he rehearsed with the Spoonful at Sebastian's home in East Quogue, New York, and he debuted with the band on June 30 at the Memorial Coliseum in Portland, Oregon.

The Spoonful reconvened in August 1967 to begin sessions for their next album, Everything Playing. In need of a producer after Jacobsen's firing, the band initially hoped to work with Roy Halee, who had worked as engineer on the band's earlier recordings, but his continued employment with Columbia Records prevented the collaboration. Koppelman-Rubin instead suggested Joe Wissert, a Philadelphia-based producer who had recently worked with the Turtles on their 1967 singles, "Happy Together" and "She'd Rather Be with Me". On Wissert's recommendation, the band moved from Columbia's recording studios to Mira Sound Studios, a new facility in New York City which made use of an AMPEX MM-1000, the industry's first 16-track recorder. The band struggled to manage the more complicated recording equipment, a situation worsened when Wissert stopped attending sessions, forcing Yester to produce in his place.

Like other folk-rock acts, the Spoonful struggled to modify their musical approach as the new genre of psychedelia expanded in popularity in 1967. The sessions for Everything Playing yielded three singles, all three of which continued the band's downward commercial performance when they failed to place in the Top Ten. "Six O'Clock", which had been recorded at Columbia before Jacobsen and Yanovsky were fired, was released in April 1967 and peaked at number 18. For the album's next single, "She Is Still a Mystery", Yester arranged an orchestral accompaniment which included strings and woodwinds played by members of the New York Philharmonic, along with horns from Ray Charles' touring band. Released in October, the single reached number 27. Everything Playing was issued in December 1967, but received negative reviews from critics and peaked at number 118 in the US after spending seven weeks on the album chart. The album track "Younger Generation" was originally intended for release as a single – a trade ad in Billboard promised it would be "the most talked-about track of 1968" – but its release never followed. Instead, "Money" was issued as a single in January 1968, and it peaked at number 48.

==== Sebastian departs, Revelation: Revolution '69 ====
After the major commercial disappointments of Everything Playing and "Money" in early 1968, Sebastian advised his bandmates that, following the Spoonful's next three months of scheduled tour dates, he planned to leave the group. The Los Angeles Times reported in April that he intended to leave by June. The band last publicly performed on June 1, 1968, at Parker Field in Richmond, Virginia. (Note: In his autobiography, Boone writes the Richmond show was June 20, but contemporary newspaper articles date it to June 1.) The following day, Sebastian told reporters that the group had probably played their last show together, and some newspapers reported in July that the band had broken up. By September, Sebastian announced his intention to pursue a solo career. Sebastian later summed up the band's career as "two glorious years and a tedious one".

Following Sebastian's departure, the remaining members of the band had little contact with one another. Butler received permission from the label to record and produce an album under the Spoonful's name, which he did without the participation of either Boone or Yester. The project's first single, the John Stewart-penned "Never Going Back", was recorded in Los Angeles at Sunset Sound Recorders before Sebastian departed the group, but he did not play on the recording. Issued in June 1968, it peaked at number 73. Butler's finished album, Revelation: Revolution '69, is credited to "The Lovin' Spoonful featuring Joe Butler". Released that October, it did not chart, and it is generally omitted from lists of the Spoonful's discography.

=== 1968–present: After the breakup ===
==== John Sebastian ====
The Spoonful were one of several bands to have broken up in 1968. In an article that December, Penny Valentine of Disc and Music Echo counted the band's breakup and the formation of the folk-rock supergroup Crosby, Stills & Nash as reflecting a consolidation in the industry, "[tying] up all the loose strings of musical talent in the pop world". Sebastian was offered a position in Crosby, Stills & Nash, but he declined, expressing his desire in a contemporary interview to focus on his solo career rather than joining a new group.

Following the Spoonful's dissolution, Sebastian was the only former member whose music career initially appeared promising. Splitting time between New York City and Los Angeles, his first major project after leaving the band was composing the lyrics and music for the Broadway show Jimmy Shine, which ran from December 1968 to April 1969. In late 1968, he signed with Warner Records and he recorded a solo album, John B. Sebastian, which included contributions from Crosby, Stills & Nash. Due to a contract dispute, release of the album was delayed by over a year until January 1970. (Note: MGM claimed that they owned the rights to the album due to their contract with the Spoonful, and the label hoped to issue it under the band's name. Both MGM and Warner issued copies of the LP with unique artwork.) It reached number 20 on the Billboard Top LPs & Tape chart.

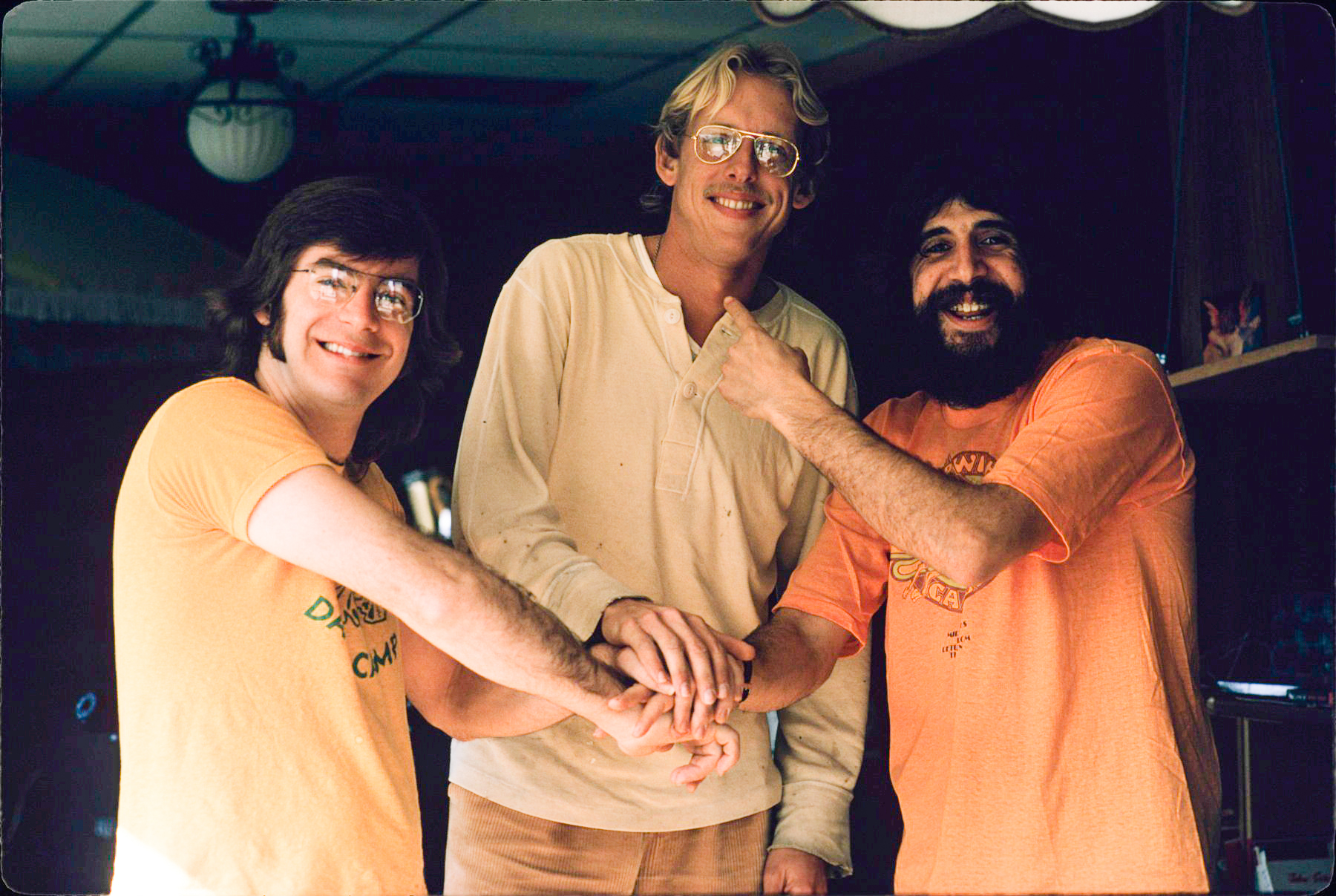
Sebastian, Jacobsen and Yanovsky in 1974

In the decade after he left the Spoonful, Sebastian was active in the concert and festival circuit, and he typically played around 100 shows a year. He made an impromptu appearance at the Woodstock festival in August 1969, in which he played the Spoonful's songs "Darling Be Home Soon" and "Younger Generation". Despite his initial successes, Sebastian struggled as a songwriter for most of the 1970s. His 1974 album Tarzana Kid did not chart, but it was produced by Erik Jacobsen, marking the first time the two collaborated since their falling out years earlier. After his first five singles were commercial failures, Sebastian's label planned to drop him; he achieved a number one hit in 1976 with "Welcome Back", the theme song for the TV show Welcome Back, Kotter, but he was unable to translate it into continued success.

==== Zal Yanovsky ====
After leaving the Spoonful, Yanovsky signed as a solo act with Buddha Records, and he continued to be managed by Cavallo. In September 1967, Buddha issued his debut single, "As Long As You're Here", which reached number 101 on Billboard's Bubbling Under the Hot 100 chart the following month. In late 1967, he began recording his first solo album, Alive and Well in Argentina, which was released in June 1968. (Note: Marti Smiley Childs and Jeff March identify the release date as April 1968, but contemporary articles in Billboard and Cash Box magazines state that Buddah debuted the album on June 8 at their first annual convention.) The album received little critical or commercial attention, but it spawned a partnership between Yanovsky and his replacement in the Spoonful, Jerry Yester, who produced the album. The two formed "Hair Shirt Productions", which produced recordings in Los Angeles for Pat Boone, Tim Buckley and the Fifth Avenue Band.

Yanovsky played in Kris Kristofferson's band on a 1970 European tour, including a performance at that year's Isle of Wight Festival. Sebastian was performing at the festival as a solo act, and during his set, Yanovsky joined him on-stage and performed several songs. Yanovsky subsequently exited the music business and moved back to Canada, opening the restaurant Chez Piggy in 1979 with his wife in Kingston, Ontario.

==== Steve Boone, Joe Butler and reunions ====
In 1969, Boone attempted to record a solo album, but the project dissolved. That same year, he produced an album for the Virginia-based folk group the Oxpetals, after which he left the music business.

Butler pivoted to Broadway acting, and he performed in the rock musical Hair. He also worked as a sound editor in Hollywood, but by later in the 1970s he was no longer active in music and instead drove a taxi cab.

Sebastian resisted subsequent efforts to reform the Spoonful, and the original members of the band only reunited twice. In late 1979, at the invitation of the musician Paul Simon, the band appeared in his 1980 film One-Trick Pony in a concert sequence which featured several 1960s acts. The band did not see each other again until March 2000, when the four original members were inducted into the Rock and Roll Hall of Fame in Cleveland. Yanovsky died of a heart attack two years later.

Butler, Boone and Yester began touring under the name the Spoonful in 1991, a venture opposed by both Sebastian and Yanovsky. Augmented by a group of touring musicians, the group released a live album, Live at the Hotel Seville, in 1999. Sebastian has since reunited with Boone and Butler once, joining them onstage in 2020 during a benefit concert.

== Musical style and development ==
=== Songwriting ===
Led by their primary songwriter John Sebastian, the Spoonful took their earliest influences from blues and jug band music. He and Yanovsky intended to be an "electric jug band", and Yanovsky summarized their style as "jug band music without the jugs". The band's music further blended influences from folk, blues, country and rock music, updating traditional American music into a modern popular music format. Sebastian later said that the music of the Jim Kweskin Jug Band was particularly influential on the band, and that the Spoonful "redid several of their tunes with only a minimal electric difference". (Note: Songs like "Daydream" and "Younger Girl" were heavily indebted to the jug band style, the latter of which featured a reworking of the melody of the 1930 song "Prison Wall Blues" by Gus Cannon's Jug Stompers.) Sebastian's songwriting drew from American pop, rock and folk, and he named Motown music and the Holland–Dozier–Holland songwriting team as among his biggest influences. (Note: Sebastian wrote "Do You Believe in Magic" by speeding up the chords of the 1963 pop song "Heat Wave" by Martha and the Vandellas, and he wrote "Daydream" by rearranging the Supremes' 1964 singles "Baby Love" and "Where Did Our Love Go".) He also named his friend and fellow folk musician Fred Neil as influential on him, particularly Neil's "effortless" style, in which a lyric "sound[s] like it just fell out of your mouth, like you hadn't really labored over it". The Spoonful's debut album featured covers of the Jim Kweskin Jug Band, Fred Neil, the folk group the Holy Modal Rounders, the 1920s blues musician Henry Thomas and the girl group the Ronettes.

[We were] R&B, the blues, bluegrass, and styles of music that are more demanding than this lowly title we have to work with of folk-rock. ... It is a title that the Spoonful immediately hated. It's a title that we understood: we just have to shut up and smile, because they're not gonna give us a new one.

— John Sebastian, 2002

The Spoonful's sound was influential on contemporary musical acts, including bands like the Beatles, the Beach Boys, the Kinks, Buffalo Springfield and the Grateful Dead. (Note: In 1966, "You Didn't Have to Be So Nice" inspired in part the Beach Boys' "God Only Knows", and "Daydream" inspired "Good Day Sunshine" by the Beatles and "Sunny Afternoon" by the Kinks. The author Domenic Priore writes that Buffalo Springfield drew from the Spoonful's sound, "particularly in terms of their guitar tone". A live performance by the Spoonful in October 1965 inspired the Grateful Dead to transition from folk music to an electric style.) The Spoonful were one of the first acts to be described as folk rock, a term coined in June 1965 to describe music which joined elements of rock-and-roll and folk-music. (Note: The earliest known use of folk-rock was in an article by the journalist Eliot Tiegel, which appeared as a cover story in the June 12, 1965, issue of Billboard magazine. Tiegel principally used the term to describe the music of the Byrds, but also the Spoonful, Sonny & Cher, Rising Sons, Jackie DeShannon and Billy J. Kramer.) They were among the main instigators of the folk-rock movement in New York City and became the most successful folk-rock band from the US East Coast. In contrast to the protest songs for which folk had been known, the Spoonful focused on optimistic, feel-good music. The band often termed their sound "good-time music", a phrase which originally described jug band music. Sebastian hoped it could serve as an alternative to "folk rock" – a term he thought "just didn't say it all" – and he used it in his early composition "Good Time Music", which the author Richie Unterberger writes served as "a sort of manifesto of the group's optimism in its jaunty rhythm and celebration of the return of good time music to the radio". Among contemporary critics in 1966, Ralph J. Gleason wrote that the Spoonful seemed to be neither rock 'n' roll nor folk rock, while Robert Shelton wrote they were "folk-rock at its most appealing", with "one foot in old-time blues, jug-band music and ragtime and the other in the modern whirl of rock 'n' roll".

=== Instrumentation ===
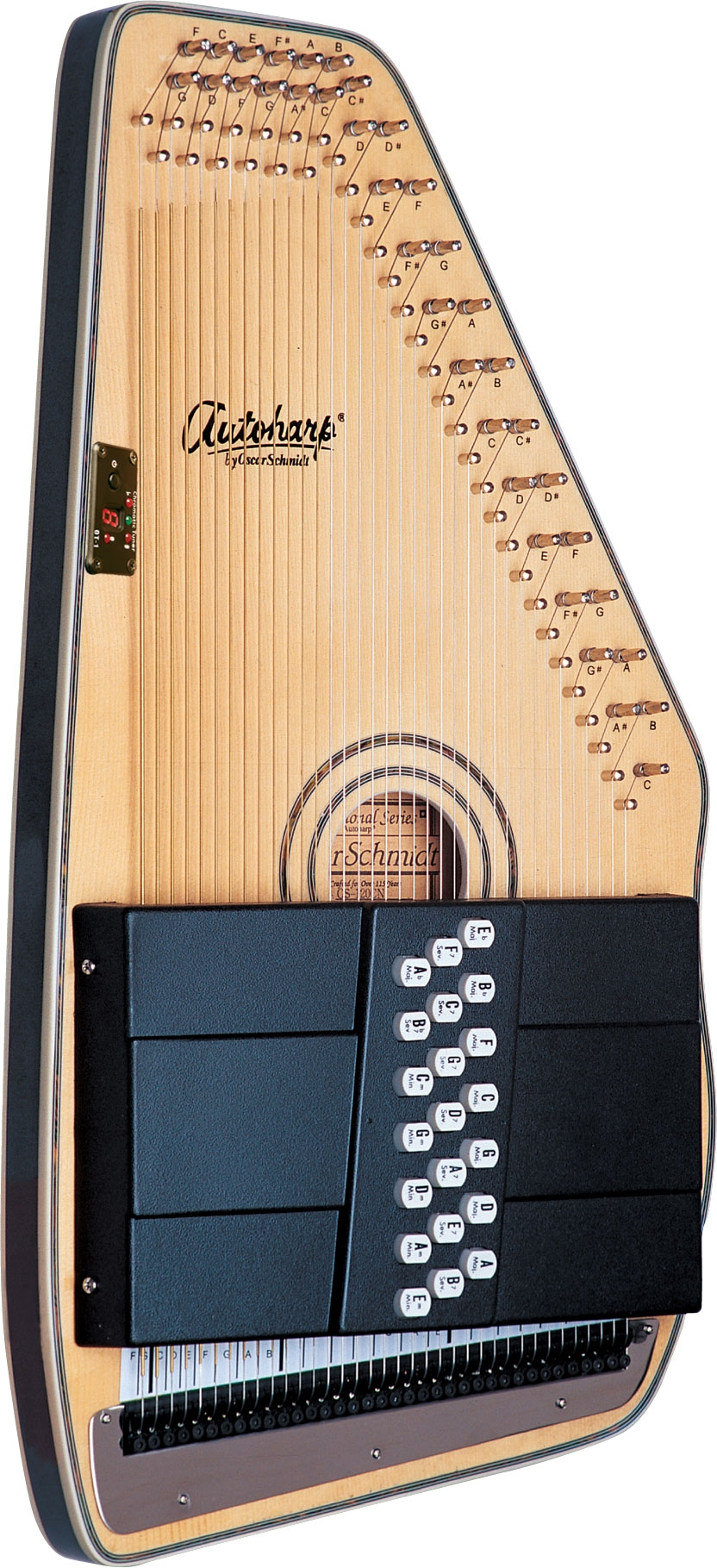
The Spoonful made prominent use of the autoharp, an instrument mostly associated with folk music.

The Spoonful played on their own recordings and were against the use of studio musicians. The band sought to avoid being typecast and aimed to sound different with each single, an approach they developed after seeing other groups fail when repeating the sound of an earlier hit. As part of their efforts, the group incorporated a variety of instruments on their recordings, including bass marimba, chimes, Irish harp and Hohner Tubon, as well as resonator, pedal steel and open-tuned twelve-string guitars. The band's music prominently featured the autoharp, a stringed instrument with buttons which, when depressed, produce preset combinations of chords, leaving it typically used as a rhythm instrument. The instrument was mostly associated with folk music, but few folk-rock or rock acts had employed it. Sebastian amplified his autoharp by affixing a ukulele contact microphone onto the back of it and then plugging it into an amplifier, a technique he developed in the rehearsal room before the band's first recording session. To generate more bottom end, the band added piano underneath, which Sebastian later said "create[d] the effect of a huge autoharp".

Despite their origins in folk music, Sebastian and Yanovsky were early fans of rock and roll. The two each played electric before acoustic guitars, and they enjoyed listening to the guitarists Duane Eddy and Link Wray. Sebastian recalled that when the two first met, he was shocked by Yanovsky's "all over the place" guitar playing, which he thought drew from the pianist Floyd Cramer and the blues guitarist Elmore James simultaneously. (Note: Sebastian considered Yanovsky's use of inversions as coming from Cramer more than any particular guitarist. He also counted the pianist Huey "Piano" Smith as another of Yanovsky's major influences.) He recalled that Yanovsky, by contrast, later admitted to being intimidated by Sebastian's clean playing, but that this became a guide to the pair's work together, where he provided a foundation onto which Yanovsky could "come in and throw flowers". Yanovsky's playing relied heavily on improvisation, and he often drew from country music, leading the commentator Peter Doggett to describe him as "the missing link between fifties rockabilly and sixties folk-rock".

Sebastian played a 1957 sunburst Gibson Les Paul electric guitar in live performances and on the band's recordings, and he used a Heritage Gibson as his main acoustic guitar. (Note: In 1966, Sebastian gave his Les Paul to Rick Derringer of the McCoys. Derringer refinished the guitar red and later traded it at Dan Armstrong Guitars in Greenwich Village. Eric Clapton bought the guitar and, in August 1968, gifted it to George Harrison, who later named it "Lucy".) Yanovsky's main guitar was a Guild Thunderbird, which he bought from Manny's Music in Midtown Manhattan around 1964. Soon after recording "Do You Believe in Magic" in June 1965, he replaced the guitar's original Guild pickups with humbuckers, which he thought "weren't quite as warm the originals, but they aged nicely". He also sometimes played a Fender Esquire. He favored a Fender Super Reverb as his standard amplifier, which he later said managed to add extra bottom end while also being loud, and which he thought sounded similar to a pedal-steel guitar.

=== Image ===
The Spoonful's image was influential on their contemporaries. The band's stage act was both eccentric and extroverted, driven by Yanovsky, who Jacobsen later said "invented the hole-y jeans, falling apart T-shirts, crazy rock guitar antics on stage, the whole subsequent thing of rock 'n' roll guitar[ists] being wild, crazy individualists". The author Bob Stanley later described the band's look as a clash between that of the Beatniks and the Beatles. The American men's fashion magazine Esquire produced a fashion spread of the band in its June 1966 issue, detailing how the group sported "mod gear", but from New York's Seventh Avenue rather than London's Carnaby Street.

The group wore clothes with stripes and spots, stripes having been popularized by Brian Jones. Sebastian often wore denim and granny glasses, the latter of which he adopted from Fritz Richmond, and which John Lennon subsequently adopted in September 1966. After the band met the fashion designer Jeannie Franklyn in December 1965 on the Sunset Strip, Franklyn designed custom-clothing for Yanovsky. Yanovsky is generally recognized as the first rock musician to wear cowboy hats and fringed buckskin jackets, and his wardrobe also consisted of fur coats, mod ties, corduroy jackets, vests and boutonnières.

== Members ==
Current members (Note: The touring iteration of the Spoonful, first assembled by Butler, Boone and Yester in 1991, has been augmented by various touring musicians. Among those who have played with the band are Mike Arturi, Phil Smith, Randy Chance, David Jayco, John Marrella, Jim Yester, Lena Yester, Jeff Alan Ross, Bill Cinque and Rob Bonfiglio.)

- Steve Boone – bass guitar, keyboards, vocals (1964–1968, 1991–present)

Past members

- John Sebastian – vocals, guitar, harmonica, autoharp, keyboards (1964–1968)
- Zal Yanovsky – vocals, guitar (1964–1967; died 2002)
- Jan Carl – drums (1964–1965)
- Joe Butler – vocals, drums, autoharp (1965–1968, 1991–2023)
- Jerry Yester – guitar, vocals (1967–1968, 1991–2017)

== Discography ==
Studio albums

- Do You Believe in Magic (1965)
- Daydream (1966)
- Hums of the Lovin' Spoonful (1966)
- Everything Playing (1967)
- Revelation: Revolution '69 (1968)

Soundtrack albums

- What's Up, Tiger Lily? (1966)
- You're a Big Boy Now (1967)

== Sources ==
=== Books ===
- Babiuk, Andy (2002). Beatles Gear: All the Fab Four's Instruments from Stage to Studio (Second revised ed.). San Francisco, California: Backbeat Books. ISBN 0-87930-731-5.
- Badman, Keith (2004). The Beach Boys: The Definitive Diary of America's Greatest Band, on Stage and in the Studio. San Francisco, California: Backbeat Books. ISBN 978-0-87930-818-6 – via the Internet Archive.
- Barone, Richard (2022). Music + Revolution: Greenwich Village in the 1960s. Lanham, Maryland: Rowman & Littlefield. ISBN 978-1-4930-6302-4 – via Google Books.
- Boone, Steve; Moss, Tony (2014). Hotter Than a Match Head: My Life on the Run with The Lovin' Spoonful. Toronto: ECW Press. ISBN 978-1-77041-193-7 – via the Internet Archive.
- Bronson, Fred (2003). The Billboard Book of Number One Hits. New York City: Billboard Books. ISBN 978-0-8230-7677-2 – via Google Books.
- Bunch, Adam (2017). The Toronto Book of the Dead. Toronto: Dundurn. ISBN 978-1-4597-3806-5 – via the Internet Archive.
- Childs, Marti Smiley; March, Jeff (1999). Echoes of the Sixties. New York City: Billboard Books. p. 222. ISBN 978-0-8230-8316-9 – via Google Books.
- Colby, Paul; Fitzpatrick, Martin (2002). The Bitter End: Hanging Out at America's Nightclub. New York City: Cooper Square Press. ISBN 978-0-8154-1206-9 – via Google Books.
- Courrier, Kevin (2008). Artificial Paradise: The Dark Side of the Beatles' Utopian Dream. Santa Barbara, California: ABC-CLIO. ISBN 978-0-313-34587-6 – via Google Books.
- Dillon, Mark (2012). Fifty Sides of the Beach Boys: The Songs That Tell Their Story. Toronto: ECW Press. ISBN 978-1-77090-198-8 – via the Internet Archive.
- Doggett, Peter (2001). Are You Ready for the Country: Elvis, Dylan, Parsons and the Roots of Country Rock. New York City: Penguin Books. ISBN 0-14-200016-7.
- Einarson, John; Furay, Richie (2004). For What It's Worth: The Story of Buffalo Springfield (Updated ed.). New York City: Cooper Square Press. ISBN 978-0-8154-1281-6.
- Einarson, John (2005). Mr. Tambourine Man: The Life and Legacy of the Byrds' Gene Clark. San Francisco, California: Backbeat Books. ISBN 0-87930-793-5.
- Everett, Walter (2009). The Foundations of Rock: From "Blue Suede Shoes" to "Suite: Judy Blue Eyes". New York City: Oxford University Press. ISBN 978-0-19-531024-5 – via Google Books.
- Fiegel, Eddi (2005). Dream a Little Dream of Me: The Life of 'Mama' Cass Elliot. London: Sidgwick & Jackson. ISBN 978-0-283-07331-1 – via the Internet Archive.
- Fletcher, Tony (2009). All Hopped Up and Ready to Go: Music from the Streets of New York 1927–77. New York City: W.W. Norton. ISBN 978-0-393-33483-8 – via the Internet Archive.
- Gould, Jonathan (2007). Can't Buy Me Love: The Beatles, Britain, and America. New York City: Three Rivers Press. ISBN 978-0-307-35337-5 – via the Internet Archive.
- Hallberg, Eric (1993). Eric Hallberg presenterar Kvällstoppen i P3: Sveriges Radios topplista över veckans 20 mest sålda skivor. Drift Musik. ISBN 9163021404.
- Hallberg, Eric; Henningsson, Ulf (2012). Tio i Topp – med de utslagna "på försök" 1961–74 (in Swedish). Premium. ISBN 978-91-89136-89-2.
- Hartman, Kent (2012). The Wrecking Crew: The Inside Story of Rock and Roll's Best-Kept Secret. New York City: St. Martin's Press. ISBN 978-0-312-61974-9 – via the Internet Archive.
- Helander, Brock (1999). The Rockin' 60s: The People Who Made the Music. New York City: Schirmer Books. ISBN 978-0-02-864873-6 – via the Internet Archive.
- Heylin, Clinton (1996). Bob Dylan: A Life in Stolen Moments Day by Day, 1941–1995. New York City: Schirmer Books. ISBN 978-0-02-864676-3 – via the Internet Archive.
- Heylin, Clinton (2021). The Double Life of Bob Dylan: A Restless, Hungry Feeling (1941–1966). New York City: Little, Brown and Company. ISBN 978-0-316-53521-2.
- Hill, Daniel Delis (2018). Peacock Revolution: American Masculine Identity and Dress in the Sixties and Seventies. London: Bloomsbury Publishing. ISBN 978-1-350-05645-9 – via Google Books.
- Hinman, Doug (2004). The Kinks: All Day and All of the Night: Day by Day Concerts, Recordings, and Broadcasts, 1961–1996. San Francisco, California: Backbeat Books. ISBN 978-0-87930-765-3.
- Hjort, Christopher (2008). So You Want to Be a Rock 'n' Roll Star: The Byrds Day-by-Day 1965–1973. London: Jawbone Press. ISBN 978-1-906002-15-2.
- Hoffmann, Frank (2016). Chronology of American Popular Music, 1900–2000. Abingdon: Routledge. ISBN 978-1-135-86885-7 – via Google Books.
- Holzman, Jac; Daws, Gavan (2000). Follow the Music: The Life and High Times of Elektra Records in the Great Years of American Pop Culture. FirstMedia Books. ISBN 978-0-9661221-1-4 – via the Internet Archive.
- Hoskyns, Barney (1996). Waiting For the Sun: Strange Days, Weird Scenes, and the Sound of Los Angeles. New York City: St. Martin's Press. ISBN 978-0-312-14444-9 – via the Internet Archive.
- Howard, Paul (2017). I Read the News Today, Oh Boy: The Short and Gilded Life of Tara Browne, the Man Who Inspired the Beatles' Greatest Song. London: Picador. ISBN 978-1-5098-0004-9.
- Houghton, Mick (2010). Becoming Elektra: The True Story of Jac Holzman's Visionary Record Label. London: Jawbone Press. ISBN 978-1-906002-29-9.
- Jackson, Andrew Grant (2015). 1965: The Most Revolutionary Year in Music. New York City: Macmillan Publishers. ISBN 978-1-4668-6497-9.
- Kruth, John (2015). This Bird Has Flown: The Enduring Beauty of Rubber Soul, Fifty Years On. Milwaukee: Backbeat Books. ISBN 978-1-61713-573-6 – via Google Books.
- Lawrence, Robb (2008). The Early Years of the Les Paul Legacy: 1915–1963. New York City: Hal Leonard Books. ISBN 978-0-634-04861-6 – via the Internet Archive.
- Lee, Sander H. (2015). Woody Allen's Angst: Philosophical Commentaries on His Serious Films. Jefferson, North Carolina: McFarland & Company, Inc. ISBN 978-1-4766-0596-8 – via Google Books.
- Lenhoff, Alan S.; Robertson, David E. (2019). Classic Keys: Keyboard Sounds That Launched Rock Music. Denton, Texas: University of North Texas Press. ISBN 978-1-57441-786-9 – via Google Books.
- Leonard, Candy (2014). Beatleness: How the Beatles and Their Fans Remade the World. New York City: Arcade Publishing. ISBN 978-1-62872-417-2 – via the Internet Archive.
- MacDonald, Ian (2007). Revolution in the Head: The Beatles' Records and the Sixties (Third ed.). Chicago Review Press. ISBN 978-1-55652-733-3 – via the Internet Archive.
- McNally, Dennis (2003). A Long Strange Trip: The Inside History of the Grateful Dead. New York City: Broadway Books. ISBN 978-0-307-41877-7 – via Google Books.
- Mersereau, Bob (2015). The History of Canadian Rock 'n' Roll. Milwaukee, Wisconsin: Backbeat Books. ISBN 978-1-4950-2891-5 – via Google Books.
- Miles, Barry (1997). Paul McCartney: Many Years from Now. New York City: Henry Holt. ISBN 0-8050-5249-6 – via the Internet Archive.
- Miles, Barry (2001). The Beatles Diary Volume 1: The Beatles Years. London: Omnibus Press. ISBN 978-0-7119-8308-3.
- Miles, Barry (2005). Hippie. New York City: Sterling Publishing Company, Inc. ISBN 978-1-4027-2873-0 – via Google Books.
- Miles, Barry (2009). The British Invasion. New York City: Sterling Publishing Company, Inc. ISBN 978-1-4027-6976-4 – via Google Books.
- Milward, John (2021). Americanaland: Where Country & Western Met Rock 'n' Roll. Champaign, Illinois: University of Illinois Press. ISBN 978-0-252-05281-1 – via Google Books.
- Myers, Marc (2017). Anatomy of a Song: The Oral History of 45 Iconic Hits That Changed Rock, R&B and Pop. London: Grove Press. ISBN 978-1-61185-959-1 – via the Internet Archive.
- Nixon, Neil (2003). "The Lovin' Spoonful". In Buckley, Peter (ed.). The Rough Guide to Rock (3rd ed.). London: Rough Guides. pp. 614–615. ISBN 978-1-84353-105-0.
- Petrus, Stephen (2015). Folk City: New York and the American Folk Music Revival. New York City: Oxford University Press. ISBN 978-0-19-023102-6 – via the Internet Archive.
- Pollock, Bruce (1984). When the Music Mattered: Rock in the 1960s. New York City: Holt, Rinehart and Winston. ISBN 0-03-060421-4 – via the Internet Archive.
- Pollock, Bruce (2009). By the Time We Got to Woodstock: The Great Rock 'n' Roll Revolution of 1969. New York City: Backbeat Books. ISBN 978-0-87930-979-4 – via the Internet Archive.
- Priore, Domenic (2007). Smile: The Story of Brian Wilson's Lost Masterpiece. London: Bobcat Books. ISBN 978-0-8256-7350-4.
- Priore, Domenic (2015). Riot on Sunset Strip: Rock'n'Roll's Last Stand in Hollywood (Revised ed.). London: Jawbone Press. ISBN 978-1-908279-90-3.
- Rees, Dafydd; Crampton, Luke (1991). Rock Movers & Shakers. New York City: Billboard Books. ISBN 978-0-8230-7609-3 – via the Internet Archive.
- Ribowsky, Mark (1989). He's a Rebel: The Truth About Phil Spector – Rock and Roll's Legendary Madman. New York City: E. P. Dutton. ISBN 978-0-525-24727-2 – via the Internet Archive.
- Rodriguez, Robert (2012). Revolver: How the Beatles Re-Imagined Rock 'n' Roll. Montclair, New Jersey: Backbeat Books. ISBN 978-1-61713-009-0 – via the Internet Archive.
- Rogan, Johnny (1997). The Byrds: Timeless Flight Revisited: The Sequel. London: Rogan House. ISBN 0-9529540-1-X.
- Rogan, Johnny (2015). Ray Davies: A Complicated Life. London: The Bodley Head. ISBN 978-1-84792-317-2 – via the Internet Archive.
- Ruppli, Michel; Novitsky, Ed, eds. (1998). The MGM Labels: 1961–1982. Westport, Connecticut: Greenwood Publishing Group. ISBN 978-0-313-30779-9 – via Google Books.
- Sandoval, Andrew (2005). The Monkees: The Day-By-Day Story of the 60s TV Pop Sensation. San Diego, California: Thunder Bay Press. ISBN 978-1-59223-372-4 – via the Internet Archive.
- Savage, Jon (2015). 1966: The Year the Decade Exploded. London: Faber & Faber. ISBN 978-0-571-27762-9.
- Selvin, Joel (1995). Summer of Love: The Inside Story of LSD, Rock & Roll, Free Love and High Times in the Wild West. New York City: Plume. ISBN 978-0-452-27407-5 – via the Internet Archive.
- Shea, Scott G. (2023). All the Leaves Are Brown: How the Mamas & the Papas Came Together and Broke Apart. Lanham, Maryland: Rowman & Littlefield. ISBN 978-1-4930-7212-5 – via Google Books.
- Shea, Stuart; Rodriguez, Robert (2007). Fab Four FAQ: Everything Left to Know About the Beatles ... and More!. New York City: Hal Leonard. ISBN 978-1-4234-2138-2 – via the Internet Archive.
- Simons, David (2004). Studio Stories: How the Great New York Records Were Made: From Miles to Madonna, Sinatra to The Ramones. San Francisco, California: Backbeat Books. ISBN 978-0-87930-817-9 – via the Internet Archive.
- Stanley, Bob (2015). Yeah Yeah Yeah: The Story of Modern Pop from Bill Haley to Beyoncé. New York City: W. W. Norton & Company. ISBN 978-0-393-35168-2.
- Tinniswood, Adrian (2021). Noble Ambitions: The Fall and Rise of the English Country House After World War II. New York City: Basic Books. ISBN 978-1-5416-1799-5 – via Google Books.
- Turner, Steve (2016). Beatles '66: The Revolutionary Year. New York City: Ecco. ISBN 978-0-06-247558-9.
- Unterberger, Richie (2002). Turn! Turn! Turn!: The '60s Folk-Rock Revolution. San Francisco: Backbeat Books. ISBN 0-87930-703-X.
- Unterberger, Richie (2003). Eight Miles High: Folk-Rock's Flight from Haight-Ashbury to Woodstock. San Francisco: Backbeat Books. ISBN 0-87930-743-9.
- Von Schmidt, Eric; Rooney, Jim (1994). Baby, Let Me Follow You Down: The Illustrated Story of the Cambridge Folk Years. Amherst, Massachusetts: University of Massachusetts Press. ISBN 978-0-87023-925-0 – via the Internet Archive.
- Wallenfeldt, Jeff, ed. (2012). Sounds of Rebellion: Music in the 1960s. New York City: Britannica Educational Publishing. ISBN 978-1-61530-913-9 – via Google Books.
- Wald, Elijah (2015). Dylan Goes Electric!: Newport, Seeger, Dylan, and the Night that Split the Sixties. New York City: HarperCollins. ISBN 978-0-06-236670-2 – via Google Books.
- Williams, Paul, ed. (2002). The Crawdaddy! Book: Writings (and Images) from the Magazine of Rock. Milwaukee, Wisconsin: Hal Leonard Corporation. ISBN 0-634-02958-4 – via Google Books.
- Wilson, Brian; Gold, Todd (1991). Wouldn't It Be Nice: My Own Story. New York City: Harper Collins. ISBN 978-0-06-018313-4.
- Zimmerman, Keith; Zimmerman, Kent (2004). Sing My Way Home: Voices of the New American Roots Rock. San Francisco, California: Backbeat Books. ISBN 978-0-87930-790-5 – via the Internet Archive.

=== Liner notes ===
- Anon. (1990). Anthology (Liner notes). The Lovin' Spoonful. Rhino. R2 70944.
- Diken, Dennis (2002). Daydream (Liner notes). The Lovin' Spoonful. Buddha, BMG Heritage. 74465 99731 2.
- Diken, Dennis (2003). Hums of the Lovin' Spoonful (Liner notes). The Lovin' Spoonful. Kama Sutra. 74465 99732 2.
- Edmonds, Ben (2000). Greatest Hits (Liner notes). The Lovin' Spoonful. Buddha, BMG Distribution. BG2 99716.
- Edmonds, Ben (2002). Do You Believe in Magic (Liner notes). The Lovin' Spoonful. Buddha, Kama Sutra. 74465 99730 2.
- Flanagan, Bill; Wilentz, Sean (2015). The Cutting Edge: 1965–1966 (Liner notes). The Bootleg Series. Bob Dylan. Columbia, Legacy. 88875124422.
- Hill, Michael (2003). Everything Playing (Liner notes). The Lovin' Spoonful. Buddha, RCA Kama Sutra. 74465 99733 2.
- Moriarty, Daniel J. (1966). What's Up, Tiger Lily? (Liner notes). The Lovin' Spoonful. Kama Sutra. KLP 8053.
- Unterberger, Richie (2005). Changes (Liner notes). The Modern Folk Quartet. Collectors' Choice Music. CCM-524.
- Unterberger, Richie (2006a). John B. Sebastian (Liner notes). John Sebastian. Collectors' Choice Music. CCM-720.
- Unterberger, Richie (2006b). Cheapo-Cheapo Productions Presents Real Live (Liner notes). John Sebastian. Collectors' Choice Music. CCM-724.
- Unterberger, Richie (2006c). Tarzana Kid (Liner notes). John Sebastian. Collectors' Choice Music. CCM-722.
