= Nashville Cats =

1966 single by the Lovin' Spoonful

- US picture sleeve

Single by the Lovin' Spoonful

from the album Hums of the Lovin' Spoonful
- B-side: "Full Measure"
- Released: November 1966
- Genre: Country; pop
- Length: 2:34
- Label: Kama Sutra
- Songwriter: John Sebastian
- Producer: Erik Jacobsen

The Lovin' Spoonful singles chronology
"Rain on the Roof" (1966)	"Nashville Cats" (1966)	"Darling Be Home Soon" (1967)

Audio
- "Nashville Cats" on YouTube

"Nashville Cats" is a song by the Canadian-American folk-rock band the Lovin' Spoonful. Written by John Sebastian, the song appeared on the band's 1966 album Hums of the Lovin' Spoonful, and it was also issued on a single released the same day as the album. The single peaked at number eight on the Billboard Hot 100 chart, marking the seventh and final time the band reached the American Top Ten.

== Composition and recording ==
John Sebastian composed "Nashville Cats" as an ode to the Nashville A-Team, a loose group of session musicians based in Nashville, Tennessee. He was initially inspired when the Lovin' Spoonful returned to their hotel after a show in the city, and he and Zal Yanovsky, the band's lead guitarist, were amazed by an unknown guitarist who played at hotel's bar. (Note: The Spoonful first toured the American South in November 1965, working as a support act for the girl group the Supremes. They played at the Nashville Municipal Auditorium on November 24. They also toured the South with the Beach Boys in April 1966, but the tour did not stop in Nashville.) Sebastian recalled:

[T]his guy shows up with a Telecaster and this crappy old amp. He sits down on the amp. There's no stage. He starts playing and it's incredible what comes out. ... [Yanovsky and I] both are saying, "How is it that this guy that doesn't even have a stage can take us to town, and just kill it, in 20 minutes?" (Note: In a 2021 interview, Sebastian could not remember the name of the guitarist, but his interviewer, Jeff Tamarkin, suspected it was Danny Gatton.)

Sebastian composed the song weeks later at his home in East Quogue, New York.

Though their sound was focused towards the popular music market, the Spoonful blended influences from blues, country and folk music. Each of the band's members enjoyed elements of country music, particularly Yanovsky, whose lead guitar playing often drew from the rockabilly guitarist Carl Perkins. Steve Boone, the band's bassist, later said that though the group's earlier efforts had hinted at country, "Nashville Cats" was their first conscious effort to make a country song. The track features an electric guitar, a pedal steel guitar and what Sebastian terms "sponge rubber guitar playing" on rhythm guitar. The pedal steel guitar had been leftover from a previous session, and Sebastian quickly learned to play it in the 45 minutes before the band began recording.

Like Boone, the rock author John Einarson describes the song as "pure country". By contrast, the author David Dachs describes the song as a parody, and the journalist Peter Doggett writes that though it was a sincere tribute from Sebastian, the song sounds "condescending" and a "pastiche of Southern slang". The author James E. Perone considers the song an example of pop music.

== Release and promotion ==
"Nashville Cats" was released as psychedelic music began to reach its height in popularity, and the song stood in contrast to the music being recorded by the Spoonful's peers. As a hedge, Kama Sutra Records opted to include a song more suggestive of psychedelia, "Full Measure", as the single's B-side. Both the band and their record label were cynical of the possibility of "Nashville Cats" succeeding in the pop charts, but the band remained hopeful it could become a crossover hit in the country music market. MGM Records mailed the song to country radio stations across the US on a promotional EP, the liner notes of which were partly written by the country musician Buck Owens.

Kama Sutra issued "Nashville Cats" in the US in late November 1966, simultaneously with the album on which it appeared, Hums of the Lovin' Spoonful. (Note: Some sources state that the single and album came out in December 1966, but William Ruhlmann of AllMusic writes both were released simultaneously, around Thanksgiving 1966. A trade ad for both releases appeared in Cash Box magazine's November 26 issue, and they each debuted on Billboard magazine's charts on December 17.) The single exceeded expectations and became a Top Ten hit; on December 17, it entered Billboard magazine's Hot 100 chart, and it peaked six weeks later at number eight. The song was the band's seventh-consecutive single since October 1965 to enter the Top 10 of the Hot 100, and it was their final single to do so. The Spoonful's version of "Nashville Cats" failed to appear on any country charts, but the American bluegrass duo Flatt and Scruggs recorded a cover which reached number 54 on Billboard's Hot Country Singles chart in 1967.

The Lovin' Spoonful's "Full Measure" is a large size hit in Los Angeles, but most of the rest of the world, including England, is playing the other side, "Nashville Cats," which hasn't even been heard much here.

— KRLA Beat, December 1966

"Full Measure" received stronger airplay than its A-side in some markets, especially Los Angeles. In KRLA Beat, the local publication of the Southern Californian radio station KRLA, "Full Measure" reached as high as number seven on the station's Top 40 Requests chart. It entered the national chart for three weeks, peaking at number 87, and it charted in Canada for one week at number 85.

Kama Sutra issued "Nashville Cats" in the UK on December 2, 1966. The single reached number 23 on Melody Maker magazine's single chart. The Spoonful had achieved quick success in the UK months earlier, when their single "Daydream" reached number two on the British charts in May 1966, but the band's subsequent singles failed to perform as well. The anonymous reviewer for the Bucks Examiner newspaper suggested that the band's declining fortunes stemmed from their recent releases lacking the striking quality needed to succeed in the singles market, adding that though "Nashville Cats" was "very good", it was "a strange choice for a single".

== Charts ==
"Nashville Cats" weekly chart performance
Chart (1966–67)	Peak position
Australia National Top 40 (Go-Set)	26
Canada Top Singles (RPM)	2
Finland (Soumen Virallinen)	38
Netherlands (Veronica Top 40)	14
Netherlands (Hilversum 3 Top 30)	11
New Zealand (Listener)	6
Norway (VG-lista)	7
Sweden (Kvällstoppen)	12
UK (Disc and Music Echo)	25
UK (Melody Maker)	23
UK (Record Retailer)	26
US Billboard Hot 100	8
US Cash Box Top 100	10
US Record World 100 Top Pops	8

"Full Measure" weekly chart performance
Chart (1967)	Peak position
Canada Top Singles (RPM)	85
US Billboard Hot 100	87
US Cash Box Top 100	97
US Record World Singles Coming Up	119

== Sources ==
- Badman, Keith (2004). The Beach Boys: The Definitive Diary of America's Greatest Band, on Stage and in the Studio. San Francisco, California: Backbeat Books. ISBN 978-0-87930-818-6 – via the Internet Archive.
- Boone, Steve; Moss, Tony (2014). Hotter Than a Match Head: My Life on the Run with The Lovin' Spoonful. Toronto: ECW Press. ISBN 978-1-77041-193-7 – via the Internet Archive.
- Dachs, David (1968). Inside Pop: America's Top Ten Groups. New York City: Scholastic Book Services. OCLC 1035670169 – via the Internet Archive.
- Doggett, Peter (2001). Are You Ready for the Country: Elvis, Dylan, Parsons and the Roots of Country Rock. New York City: Penguin Books. ISBN 0-14-200016-7.
- Einarson, John (2001). Desperados: The Roots of Country Rock. Lanham, Maryland: Cooper Square Press. ISBN 978-1-4616-0733-5 – via Google Books.
- Hallberg, Eric (1993). Eric Hallberg presenterar Kvällstoppen i P3: Sveriges Radios topplista över veckans 20 mest sålda skivor (in Swedish). Drift Musik. ISBN 91-630-2140-4.
- Nyman, Jake (2005). Suomi soi 4: Suuri suomalainen listakirja (in Finnish) (1st ed.). Helsinki: Tammi. ISBN 951-31-2503-3.
- Perone, James E. (2018). Listen to Pop! Exploring a Musical Genre. Santa Barbara, California: ABC-CLIO. ISBN 978-1-4408-6377-6 – via Google Books.
- Segretto, Mike (2022). 33 1/3 Revolutions Per Minute: A Critical Trip Through the Rock LP Era, 1955–1999. Lanham, Maryland: Rowman & Littlefield. ISBN 978-1-4930-6460-1 – via Google Books.
- Stimeling, Travis D. (2020). Nashville Cats: Record Production in Music City. New York City: Oxford University Press. ISBN 978-0-19-750281-5 – via Google Books.
- Williams, Paul, ed. (2002). The Crawdaddy! Book: Writings (and Images) from the Magazine of Rock. Milwaukee, Wisconsin: Hal Leonard Corporation. ISBN 0-634-02958-4 – via Google Books.
