= Rain on the Roof (song) =

1966 single by the Lovin' Spoonful

- US picture sleeve

Single by the Lovin' Spoonful

from the album Hums of the Lovin' Spoonful
- B-side: "Pow (Theme from 'What's Up, Tiger Lily?')" (US); "Warm Baby" (UK)
- Released: September 1966
- Genre: Soft rock; baroque rock
- Length: 2:11
- Label: Kama Sutra
- Songwriter: John Sebastian
- Producer: Erik Jacobsen

The Lovin' Spoonful singles chronology
"Summer in the City" (1966)	"Rain on the Roof" (1966)	"Nashville Cats" (1966)

Licensed audio
- "Rain on the Roof" on YouTube

"Rain on the Roof" (sometimes titled "You and Me and Rain on the Roof") is a song by the Canadian-American folk-rock band the Lovin' Spoonful. Written by John Sebastian, the song was released as a single in September 1966, (Note: Later sources identify the release date as October 1966, but the October 7 issue of The Herald Statesman says the record came out "[l]ast week", indicating the week of September 26–30.) and it was included on the album Hums of the Lovin' Spoonful in November. The song reached number ten on the Billboard Hot 100 chart, making it the Lovin' Spoonful's sixth-consecutive single to reach the top ten in the United States.

"Rain on the Roof" features several guitars played by Sebastian and Zal Yanovsky, as well as an Irish harp. Released three months after the harder-rock styled single "Summer in the City", "Rain on the Roof" represented a return to the softer sound for which the Lovin' Spoonful had become known. Contemporary reviewers noted the difference between the singles, while still positively reviewing "Rain on the Roof".

== Composition and recording ==
John Sebastian composed "Rain on the Roof" after a night spent listening to the rain with his wife Loretta "Lorey" Kaye in their Greenwich Village apartment. The song similarly describes two lovers listening to the rain, while featuring a melody suggestive of the Greek Mixolydian mode. Produced and arranged by the Lovin' Spoonful's regular producer Erik Jacobsen, the recording features an interplay of guitars between Zal Yanovsky and Sebastian, including a Ditson acoustic twelve-string and a pedal steel guitar. In addition, Sebastian played an Irish harp, a stringed instrument he acquired when the band visited Dublin in April 1966. Yanovsky added further elements with his Guild Thunderbird electric guitar. To generate a French horn-like sound, he turned the treble off on his guitar but turned up the amplifier's treble and gain, resulting in distortion and the beginning of feedback. Yanovksy used his standard amplifier, a Fender Super Reverb, which he later said added extra bottom end while also being loud.

Steve Boone, the band's bassist, later reflected being "mesmerized" by each of his bandmates' guitar work, characterizing it as "like music from heaven". The author Bernard Gendron considers the guitars reminiscent of harpsichords, leading him to place the song in the contemporary baroque rock trend. The author Maury Dean instead considers the song soft rock, due to its twelve-string guitar melody.

After recording the backing track, the band's earliest attempts at recording vocals featured a round sung by Sebastian, Yanovsky and drummer Joe Butler, similar in style to their 1965 song "Didn't Want to Have to Do It". They abandoned this format for the final recording, instead opting for a solo vocal from Sebastian. The recording fades out on a dominant seventh chord, which according to musicologist Walter Everett means the song "never [achieves a] full-cadence closure", leaving it feeling unresolved.

== Release and reception ==
The possibility of releasing "Rain on the Roof" as a single generated disagreement among the members of the Spoonful. The band's previous single, "Summer in the City", had featured a harder sound than their previous output, and it had attracted new fans to the group after it reached number one on the Billboard Hot 100 chart in August 1966. Both Boone and Butler worried that returning to a softer sound with "Rain on the Roof" would potentially alienate the band's new fans. Sebastian countered that the band ought to avoid releasing consecutive singles which sounded too similar, further contending that "Rain on the Roof" would add another dimension to their sound. (Note: Reflecting on the situation decades later, Boone questioned why Kama Sutra did not demand a more natural follow-up to "Summer in the City" while expecting that the label were inclined to show deference to Sebastian after he had achieved a number one single.)

Kama Sutra Records issued "Rain on the Roof" as a single in the last week of September 1966. In their promotion of the single, the band performed it on the ABC variety show The Hollywood Palace, aired September 24. In the October 8 issue of Billboard, the magazine's review panel highlighted the song as likely to reach the top 20 of the Hot 100, and the single debuted on the chart the following week at number 76. It remained on the chart for ten weeks and peaked at number ten, making it the Lovin' Spoonful's sixth consecutive single to reach the top ten. The song was later included on the band's November 1966 album Hums of the Lovin' Spoonful, where it appeared as the opening track of side two. Because the song shared its name with a 1931 composition by songwriter Ann Ronell, Kama Sutra altered its title on Hums of the Lovin' Spoonful to "You and Me and Rain on the Roof".

Billboard's reviewer counted "Rain on the Roof" as a continuation of the band's "unpredictable, fresh, original material", writing that the "clever rhythm ballad with [a] baroque feel" was a likely blockbuster. Reviewers in both Cash Box and Record World magazines highlighted the song's difference from "Summer in the City", Cash Box's reviewer calling it a return to the band's "soft-rock stylings". In the UK, Jonathan King of Disc and Music Echo wrote that, while everyone else was "raving" about the single, he "detest[ed]" it. In an interview with Melody Maker magazine in December 1966, Bruce Woodley of the Australian pop group the Seekers praised the song's guitar work as beautiful while questioning why the song was not popular in the United Kingdom. Writing about the song decades later, author Charles Winick considers "Rain on the Roof"'s melody and lyrics as having more in common with the music of decades earlier than contemporary rock music.

== Charts ==
Weekly chart performance
Chart (1966)	Peak position
Australia National Top 40 (Go-Set)	31
Canada Top Singles (RPM)	12
Finland (Soumen Virallinen)	28
Netherlands (Veronica Top 40)	11
Netherlands (Hilversum 3 Top 30)	13
New Zealand (Listener)	3
Sweden (Kvällstoppen)	11
Sweden (Tio i Topp)	3
UK (Disc and Music Echo)	48
UK (Melody Maker)	47
US Billboard Hot 100	10
US Cash Box Top 100	9
US Record World 100 Top Pops	6
