= Hums of the Lovin' Spoonful =

Album by the Lovin' Spoonful

Studio album by the Lovin' Spoonful
- Released: November 1966
- Studios: Bell Sound and Columbia 7th Avenue, New York City; unidentified studio, (Note: When the Spoonful recorded in Los Angeles for their first two albums, they went to either RCA or Sunset Sound, both of which were located on Sunset Boulevard in downtown Hollywood.) Los Angeles
- Genres: Folk rock; pop
- Length: 26:48
- Label: Kama Sutra
- Producer: Erik Jacobsen

The Lovin' Spoonful chronology
What's Up, Tiger Lily? (1966)	Hums of the Lovin' Spoonful (1966)	The Best of the Lovin' Spoonful (1967)

Singles from Hums of the Lovin' Spoonful
- 1. "Summer in the City" Released: July 4, 1966; 2. "Rain on the Roof" Released: September 1966 (Note: Later sources identify the release date of "Rain on the Roof" as October 1966, but the October 7 issue of The Herald Statesman says the record came out "[l]ast week", indicating the week of September 26–30.); 3. "Nashville Cats" / "Full Measure" Released: November 1966

Hums of the Lovin' Spoonful is the third studio album by the Canadian-American folk-rock band the Lovin' Spoonful. It was released in November 1966 by Kama Sutra Records. It peaked at No. 14 on the Billboard Pop Albums chart.

== Background ==
The Spoonful recorded Hums throughout 1966, whenever they had days off from their busy touring schedule. Most of the album was recorded in Midtown Manhattan in New York City, split between Columbia Records' 7th Avenue Studio and Bell Sound Studios, but additional recording took place in June 1966 in Los Angeles. A string of sessions were originally set to take place at Columbia from August 16 to September 23, but recording was delayed due to booking issues.

Hums was a deliberate attempt by the band to record in a variety of styles. They composed and played in the pop, country, jug-band, blues and folk styles. It would ultimately be the last full project by the original lineup. The album managed to spawn four charting singles for the band, including the No. 1 hit "Summer in the City". "Rain on the Roof", "Nashville Cats", and "Full Measure" also appeared on the Pop charts, all but the last making it to the Top 10. Bobby Darin had a Top 40 hit with a cover version of "Lovin' You". Johnny Cash and June Carter Cash covered "Darlin' Companion" in 1969 on Johnny Cash at San Quentin. Principal songwriter John Sebastian said of "Nashville Cats" — which made No. 8 on the Billboard Hot 100 — "We thought our version would cross over to the country market. It never did. So we're always kind, gee, well I guess that tells us what we are and what we aren't." Flatt & Scruggs took "Nashville Cats" to No. 54 on the country charts as a single. Dolly Parton covered "Lovin' You" for her 1977 album Here You Come Again.

Hums of the Lovin' Spoonful was re-released in 2003 on the Sundazed label with bonus tracks consisting of four demos, instrumental tracks, and alternate versions/mixes of songs from the album, along with extensive liner notes. It was also released on CD along with Do You Believe in Magic? in 1995.

== Reception ==
Professional ratings
Review scores
Source	Rating
AllMusic	4.5/5 stars
Encyclopedia of Popular Music	4/5 stars
Mojo	4/5 stars
MusicHound Rock	4/5
Select	2/5 medals
Uncut	4/5 stars

William Ruhlman of AllMusic wrote of the album: "An emphasis on the parts of the album is a way of describing it as more a loose collection of disparate tracks than a unified effort, despite Sebastian's hand in all the compositions and his lead vocals on most of them. This was by necessity, but also by design, since Sebastian and co. went into the studio trying to sound completely different each time. They often succeeded..."

== Track listing ==
All songs written by John Sebastian except where otherwise noted.

Side one

1. "Lovin' You" – 2:25
2. "Bes' Friends" – 1:52
3. "Voodoo in My Basement" – 2:35
4. "Darlin' Companion" – 2:22
5. "Henry Thomas" – 1:40
6. "Full Measure" (Steve Boone, J. Sebastian) – 2:40

Side two

1. "Rain on the Roof" – 2:13
2. "Coconut Grove" (J. Sebastian, Zal Yanovsky) – 2:38
3. "Nashville Cats" – 2:34
4. "4 Eyes" – 2:53
5. "Summer in the City" (J. Sebastian, Mark Sebastian, Boone) – 2:39

== Personnel ==
According to Dennis Diken's 2003 liner notes, except where noted:

The Lovin' Spoonful

- John Sebastian – lead and backing vocals; acoustic and electric guitars, keyboards, autoharp; harmonium ("Bes' Friends"); harmonica, ocarina and slide whistle (Note: Diken's 2003 liner notes identify Yanovksy as playing slide whistle on "Henry Thomas", but in the March 1967 issue of Hit Parader, Sebastian credits it to himself.) ("Henry Thomas"); additional drums ("Full Measure"); Irish harp ("Rain on the Roof"); pedal steel guitar ("Rain on the Roof" and "Nashville Cats")
- Zal Yanovsky – backing vocals, guitars; Hohner Tubon ("Lovin' You"); lead vocals ("Voodoo in My Basement"); slide guitar ("4 Eyes"); wastepaper basket ("Summer in the City")
- Steve Boone – bass guitar, keyboards; upright bass ("Bes' Friends")
- Joe Butler – backing vocals, drums; lead vocals ("Full Measure")
- unidentified (played by the Lovin' Spoonful) – twelve-string guitar ("Lovin' You"); banjo ("Bes' Friends" and "Henry Thomas"); woodblocks, bass marimba, wastepaper basket, log drums and steel drums ("Voodoo in My Basement"); harmonium and jingle bell ("Full Measure"); organ and African hair drum ("Coconut Grove")

Additional musicians

- Henry Diltz – clarinet ("Bes' Friends"); photography
- Larry Hankin – Jew's harp ("Henry Thomas")
- Artie Schroeck – electric piano ("Summer in the City")

Production

- Erik Jacobsen – producer
- Roy Halee – engineering

== Charts and certifications ==
Weekly chart performance
Chart (1966–1967)	Peak position
Canadian RPM 25 Top LPs	3
Norwegian VG-lista Albums	9
US Billboard Top LPs	14
US Cash Box Top 100 Albums	14
US Record World Album Chart	4

Year-end chart performance
Chart (1967)	Ranking
US Cash Box	59
