= Hotel Albert (New York City) =

Historic building in Manhattan, New York

- U.S. National Register of Historic Places
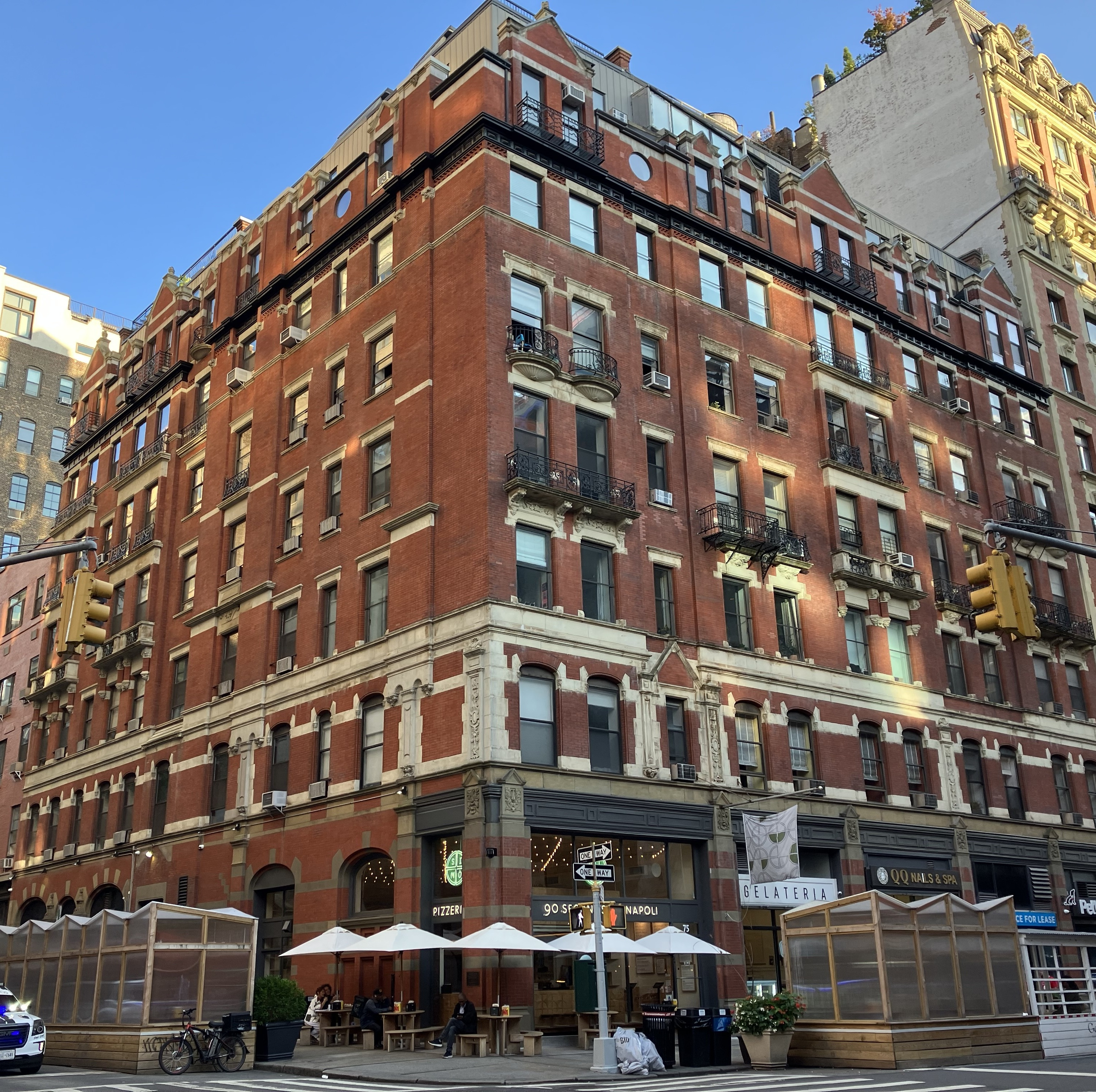
- The original Hotel Albert in 2023, at 40 East 11th Street

- Location within Lower Manhattan Location within New York Location within the United States
- Location: 23 E. 10th St., New York City
- Coordinates: 40°43′58″N 73°59′37″W
- Area: 0.64 acres (0.26 ha)
- Built: c. 1876-1877, 1883, 1891, 1903-1904
- Architect: James Irving Howard; Henry J. Hardenbergh; Buchman & Fox; William L. Bottomley with Sugarman, Hess & Berger.
- Architectural style: Renaissance, French Renaissance, Classical Revival
- NRHP reference No.: 12000329
- Added to NRHP: June 13, 2012

Hotel Albert, also known as The Albert and Albert Apartments, is a historic hotel and apartment complex located in the Greenwich Village neighborhood of Lower Manhattan, New York City. The hotel was noted for being popular among artists, musicians, writers, and political radicals. It was listed on the National Register of Historic Places in 2012.

== History ==
The Albert began with three row houses at 32-36 East 11th Street, off of University Place, which were turned into the St. Stephen Hotel in 1876–1877 to designs by James Irving Howard. The owner, Albert S. Rosenbaum, then commissioned architect Henry Janeway Hardenbergh to build 24 "French flats" (luxury apartments) between the hotel and University Place. Completed in 1883, they were converted into the Hotel Albert in 1886–1887. An additional story was added in 1891, and the two hotels merged in the mid-1890s. In 1903–1904, a 12-story building was added to the south at 67 University Place, designed by Buchman & Fox, and in 1922–1924 a six-story building on the corner at 23 East 10th Street, designed by William L. Bottomley and Sugarman, Hess & Berger, while the St. Stephen was given an entirely new facade in the 1920s, and let go for commercial lease. In 1977 the entire complex, including the St. Stephen, was converted to rental apartments as The Albert. It was then converted to a co-op in 1984.

In 2009, the co-op board of The Albert commissioned historian Anthony W. Robins to research the history of the buildings.

== See also ==
- National Register of Historic Places listings in Manhattan below 14th Street
