= 1967 in music =

The year 1967 was important for psychedelic rock, and was famous for its "Summer of Love" in San Francisco. It saw major releases from multiple well-known bands including the Beatles, Small Faces, the newly renamed Eric Burdon and the Animals, Jefferson Airplane, Love, The Beach Boys, Cream, the Byrds, the Rolling Stones, the Who, and the Monkees. This year also saw debuts from many upcoming bands such as the Jimi Hendrix Experience, Big Brother and the Holding Company, the Doors, Moby Grape, Procol Harum, Traffic, the Velvet Underground, and Pink Floyd.

== Specific locations ==
- 1967 in British music
- 1967 in Japanese music
- 1967 in Norwegian music

== Specific genres ==
- 1967 in country music
- 1967 in jazz
- 1967 in progressive rock

== Events ==
- January 13 – Stephen Foster Memorial Day is observed for the first time in the United States (on the 103rd anniversary of the composer's death).
- January 14 – The Human Be-In takes place in San Francisco's Golden Gate Park Polo Fields with spoken words from Timothy Leary, Allen Ginsberg, Gary Snyder and others. Live music is provided by Jefferson Airplane, the Grateful Dead, Big Brother and the Holding Company and Quicksilver Messenger Service. Speeches from Jerry Rubin and others are also given at the event.
- January 15 – The Rolling Stones appear on The Ed Sullivan Show in the United States. At Sullivan's request, the band change the lyrics of "Let's Spend the Night Together" to "Let's spend some time together".
- January 16 – The Monkees begin work on Headquarters, the first album to give them complete artistic and technical control over their material.
- January 17 – The Daily Mail newspaper in Britain reports 4,000 potholes in Blackburn, Lancashire; and Guinness heir Tara Browne is killed in a car wreck. These articles inspire lyrics for the Beatles song "A Day in the Life".
- January 22 – Simon & Garfunkel give a live concert at Philharmonic Hall in New York City. Some of this concert is released on October 4, 1997, on their box set Old Friends, but most is not released until July 2002.
- January 29 – Mantra-Rock Dance, the "ultimate high" of the hippie era, is organised at The Avalon ballroom in San Francisco, featuring Janis Joplin, the Grateful Dead, Big Brother and the Holding Company, Moby Grape, beat poet Allen Ginsberg and A. C. Bhaktivedanta Swami Prabhupada in support of the International Society for Krishna Consciousness.
- January 30 – The Beatles shoot a promotional film for their forthcoming single "Strawberry Fields Forever" at Knole Park in Sevenoaks.
- February 3 – UK record producer Joe Meek murders his landlady and then commits suicide by shooting himself in the head at Holloway, North London.
- February 6 – Michael Nesmith and Micky Dolenz of the Monkees fly into London. Dolenz sees Till Death Us Do Part on British TV and uses the term "Randy Scouse Git" from the programme for the title of the Monkees' next single release "Randy Scouse Git", not realising it is an offensive term. British censors force the title to be changed to "Alternate Title" in the UK.
- February 7 – Micky Dolenz meets Paul McCartney at his home in St John's Wood, London, and they pose together for the press. His impressions of the visit feature in the lyrics of "Randy Scouse Git".
- February 10 – Abbey Road Studio 2 session with Michael Nesmith and other friends in attendance as the Beatles record "A Day in the Life" with the London Philharmonic Orchestra performing an "orgasm of noise" featured twice in the song.
- February 12 – British police raid 'Redlands', the Sussex home of Keith Richards in the early hours of the morning following a tip-off about a party from the News of the World; although no arrests are made at the time, Richards, Mick Jagger and art dealer Robert Fraser are subsequently charged with possession of drugs.
- February 16 – "Aretha Franklin Day" is declared in Detroit, Michigan.
- February 24 – The Bee Gees sign a management contract with Robert Stigwood.
- March 2 – The 9th Annual Grammy Awards are held in Los Angeles, hosted by Kirk Douglas. Frank Sinatra wins the most awards with five, including Album of the Year for A Man and His Music and Record of the Year for "Strangers in the Night". The Beatles win Song of the Year for "Michelle".
- March 3 – Eric Burdon & the Animals refuse to perform a show in Ottawa, Ontario, unless they are paid in advance. The audience of 3000 riots, causing $5000 in damages to the auditorium.
- March 11 – A taped appearance by the Beatles on American Bandstand includes their new music video for the songs "Penny Lane" and "Strawberry Fields Forever".
- March 19 — Foundation of the Salzburg Easter Festival.
- March 25 – The Who perform their first concert in the United States, in New York City.
- March 27 – John Lennon and Paul McCartney are awarded the Ivor Novello award for "Michelle", the most performed song in Britain in 1966.
- March 30 – The Beatles pose with a photographic collage and wax figures from Madame Tussaud's famous museum for the cover artwork of Sgt. Pepper's Lonely Hearts Club Band album at Chelsea Manor Studios in London.
- March 31 – Kicking off a tour with the Walker Brothers, Cat Stevens and Engelbert Humperdinck at the London Astoria, Jimi Hendrix sets fire to his guitar on stage for the first time. He is taken to hospital suffering burns to his hands but the guitar-burning act will become a trademark of Hendrix's performances.
- April 8 – The 12th Eurovision Song Contest is held in the Hofburg Imperial Palace, Vienna, Austria. The United Kingdom wins the contest for the first time with the Bill Martin/Phil Coulter song "Puppet on a String", sung by Sandie Shaw barefoot.
- May 1
  - Paul McCartney reveals that all four members of the Beatles have "dropped acid".
  - Elvis Presley marries Priscilla Beaulieu at the Aladdin, Las Vegas.
- May 2 – In the United States, Capitol Records pulls the plug on the Beach Boys' mysterious Smile project. Brian Wilson, who has taken more than a year to compose and produce the album, cannot bring himself to finish it.
- May 12
  - Pink Floyd stage the first ever rock concert with quadraphonic sound at the Queen Elizabeth Hall, London ("Games for May").
  - The debut album of the Jimi Hendrix Experience, Are You Experienced, is released in the UK, where it was recorded.
- May 15 – Paul McCartney meets American photographer Linda Eastman at the "Bag O' Nails" club in London.
- May 19 – Linda Eastman photographs the Beatles at the London press party for Sgt. Pepper's Lonely Hearts Club Band held at the Chapel Street home of Brian Epstein. Media present are perplexed by the band's fashion statements and the music itself.
- May 26 – Sgt. Pepper's Lonely Hearts Club Band by the Beatles is rush released in the UK as mono and stereo LPs ahead of the scheduled June 1 release date. "The closest Western Civilization has come to unity since the Congress of Vienna in 1815 was the week the Sgt. Pepper album was released."
- May 30 – BBC Light Programme radio in the UK broadcasts an edition of Where It's At featuring the Beatles interviews and John Lennon's comedy intro to "Lucy in the Sky with Diamonds". The BBC refuse to air "A Day in the Life" for alleged "drug references" in the lyrics.
- June 1 – Greece's fascist junta issues "Army decree No 13", which bans playing or listening to the music of Mikis Theodorakis.
- June 4 – Jimi Hendrix Experience, Cream, Denny Laine and his Electric String Band, Procol Harum and The Chiffons perform a two-hour "Sunday Special" at the Saville Theatre in London.
- June 10–11 – The KFRC Fantasy Fair and Magic Mountain Music Festival at Mount Tamalpais in Marin County, California features Canned Heat, the Byrds, the Seeds, Blues Magoos, Jefferson Airplane, the Doors, Country Joe and the Fish and others on the bill for a charity concert attended by 20,000-40,000; considered America's first pop festival, but eclipsed in stature by the Monterey Pop Festival the following week.
- June 15 – English cellist Jacqueline du Pré marries Jewish conductor Daniel Barenboim at the Western Wall in Jerusalem.
- June 16 – Barbra Streisand performs a live concert "A Happening in Central Park" in New York's Central Park.
- June 16–18 – The Monterey Pop Festival, one of the world's first outdoor rock music festivals, is held in Monterey, California. Stars include the Who, Simon and Garfunkel, Eric Burdon & the Animals, the Byrds, The Association, Jefferson Airplane, Big Brother and The Holding Company with Janis Joplin, Jimi Hendrix and Ravi Shankar. Otis and the MG's take the stage at 1:00 am after Jefferson Airplane and bring down the house; 55,000 are estimated to be in attendance.
- June 25 – The Beatles debut "All You Need Is Love" to close the Our World television special from London, the first worldwide television broadcast, seen live by an audience of over 400 million in 25 countries. Backing singers include Eric Clapton, members of the Rolling Stones and the Who.
- June 28
  - The Supremes perform for the first time as Diana Ross & the Supremes at the Flamingo Hotel in Las Vegas. Florence Ballard is fired from the group on July 1, and on-hand stand-in Cindy Birdsong permanently takes Ballard's place in the group.
  - The Monkees fly into London at the start of their concerts at the Empire Pool, Wembley.
- June 29 – Mick Jagger and Keith Richards are sentenced to jail in England for drug possession. They later appeal successfully against the sentences.
- June–July – Shortly after the end of the Six-Day War, conductor Leonard Bernstein leads the Israel Philharmonic Orchestra on a tour to the Sinai desert, the site of fighting only days before.
- July 1 – William Rees-Mogg, editor of The Times (London), uses the phrase "Who breaks a butterfly upon a wheel?" in his editorial criticizing the prison sentences given to Mick Jagger and Keith Richard two days earlier.
- July 2 – Jeff Beck and John Mayall & the Bluesbreakers perform a two-hour "Sunday Special" at the Saville Theatre in London.
- July 3 – The Beatles host a party at the Speakeasy Club for the Monkees on the completion of their concerts in London.
- July 5 – First of the Schaefer Music Festivals, held in Central Park, New York City. The lineup consists of Len Chandler, the Young Rascals and the Jimi Hendrix Experience.
- July 18 – The Jimi Hendrix Experience is thrown off a tour of the Monkees after complaints from the conservative Daughters of the American Revolution. (Hendrix's manager Chas Chandler later admits it was a publicity stunt.)
- July 29 – Motown Records releases "Reflections," the first single by the group's new billing, "Diana Ross & the Supremes" and after firing founding member Florence Ballard; Ballard, nevertheless, sings on the record and appears on the vinyl's cover alongside group members Ross and Wilson because the song was recorded before her dismissal.
- August 4 – Pink Floyd release their debut album, The Piper at the Gates of Dawn. It peaks at number 6 on the UK Albums Chart and is the only one made under the leadership of founder Syd Barrett.
- August 14 – The Marine, &c., Broadcasting (Offences) Act 1967 becomes law in the United Kingdom, and most offshore radio stations (including Wonderful Radio London) have already closed down. Only Radio Caroline North & South on 259 will continue, as Radio Caroline International.
- August 21 – Mikis Theodorakis is arrested by the Greek military authorities and jailed for five months.
- August 23 – Brian Epstein's last visit to a Beatles' recording session, at the Chappell Recording Studios on Maddox Street, London. The last new Beatles song he lives to hear is "Your Mother Should Know". Epstein dies of an overdose of Carbitral, a form of barbiturate or sleeping pill, in his locked bedroom, on August 27.
- August 27 – The Beatles, in Bangor, Wales, with the Maharishi Mahesh Yogi since August 25, are informed of the death of their manager Brian Epstein, and return to London at once.
- August 31 – Paul McCartney calls a band meeting to discuss his TV movie idea about a psychedelic bus ride.
- September 7 – Eric Burdon marries Angie King.
- September 16 – Too ill to conduct, after undergoing surgery for pancreatic cancer, Sir Malcolm Sargent makes a valedictory appearance at the Last Night of the Proms.
- September 17 – In the United States:
  - The Doors appear on The Ed Sullivan Show and perform "Light My Fire". Despite having agreed to Sullivan's request that the line "Girl we couldn't get much higher" be changed for the show, Jim Morrison performs it the way it was written and the Doors are banned from the show.
  - The Who destroy their instruments during a performance on The Smothers Brothers Comedy Hour. Keith Moon's exploding drum kit injures Pete Townshend.
- September 29 – Tangerine Dream is founded by Edgar Froese in West Berlin.
- September 30 – The BBC in the UK introduces a pop music channel, Radio 1, and changes the Light Programme into the more MOR-orientated Radio 2, also renaming the Third Programme, which covers classical music and culture, into Radio 3 (and transforming the Home Service into the speech-oriented Radio 4). Radio 1's split from Radio 2 is heralded by "Theme One", specially composed by George Martin; Radio 1's programmes then launch with a jingle recorded by PAMS, the voice of DJ Tony Blackburn and his signature tune, an extract from "Beefeaters" by Johnny Dankworth. The first full single played is the Move's "Flowers in the Rain". The first song played on Radio 2 is Julie Andrews with the title song from "The Sound of Music".
- October 11 – Harold Wilson, Prime Minister of the United Kingdom, wins a libel action against rock band the Move in the English High Court after being depicted in a compromising position on a promotional postcard for their record "Flowers in the Rain"; in settlement, royalties from the song will be donated to charity.
- October 14 – Tammi Terrell faints and collapses into duet partner Marvin Gaye's arms onstage during a performance at the Hampton University homecoming in Virginia. She is later diagnosed with a brain tumor, and will die from brain cancer in 1970 at the age of 24.
- October 18 – The first issue of Rolling Stone magazine rolls off the press at about 5:30pm, with a cover dated November 9 and featuring a photo of John Lennon in the film How I Won the War. The original inspiration for the magazine was Bomp! magazine based in California.
- October 27 – Sir Malcolm Sargent's memorial service in Westminster Abbey is attended by 3,000 people including Princess Marina of Kent, Bridget D'Oyly Carte, Pierre Boulez, Larry Adler, Douglas Fairbanks Junior, Léon Goossens, Sir Arthur Bliss, and representatives of the London orchestras and of the Promenaders. Colin Davis and the BBC Chorus and Symphony Orchestra perform the music.
- November 22
  - Oricon is founded in Japan by Sōkō Koike and begins publishing a singles chart.
  - Otis Redding records "(Sittin' On) The Dock of the Bay" at Stax Records' studio in Memphis, Tennessee.
  - George Harrison begins recording tracks for Wonderwall Music, his first solo album, in London; he continues the recording in Mumbai.
- December 5 – The Beatles open the Apple Boutique in London. Party guests include Eric Clapton and movie director Richard Lester.
- December 7 – Otis Redding records overdubs to "(Sittin' On) The Dock of the Bay".
- December 8 – Otis Redding and his backup band, Bar-Kays, play at a popular nightclub, Leo's Casino in Cleveland, Ohio. This is to be Redding's last performance. Two days later he and four of the six Bar-Kays are among the six people who die when a Beechcraft Model 18 plane in which they are traveling crashes in Lake Monona, Madison, Wisconsin, one of the worst air tragedies in entertainment history, and the worst since "The Day the Music Died" when Buddy Holly, Ritchie Valens and the Big Bopper died in a crash in 1959.
- December 9 – During a performance at the New Haven Arena in New Haven, Connecticut, Jim Morrison of the Doors becomes the first singer to be arrested on stage, having previously been sprayed with a can of mace. He is charged with inciting a riot, indecency and public obscenity. The charges are dropped several weeks later due to a lack of evidence.
- December 15 – The Who release their third studio album, The Who Sell Out. It is a concept album, formatted as a collection of unrelated songs interspersed with faux commercials and public service announcements.
- December 26 – First telecast of the Beatles' Magical Mystery Tour (filmed mostly during September) on BBC1 in the UK. Shown in black and white, it upsets McCartney because it ruins the intended psychedelic color effects.
- date unknown
  - Pickwick Records releases an LP collection of ten 1950s A- and B-sides of singles by Simon & Garfunkel, recorded under their pseudonym Tom & Jerry, and tries to pass it off as current material by the duo. Simon and Garfunkel file a legal challenge, and the record is swiftly withdrawn from the market.
  - Toots & the Maytals releases "54-46 That's My Number", one of the first reggae songs.
  - The Savonlinna Opera Festival is re-launched in Savonlinna, Finland, after a gap of fifty years.
  - The first LP recording of traditional Estonian music, Eesti rahvalaule ja pillilugusid, is released.
  - The International Society of Bassists is founded by Gary Karr.
  - Ali Akbar Khan founds a school of music in California.

== Musical groups formed ==
- See Category:Musical groups established in 1967

== Musical groups disbanded ==
- See Category:Musical groups disestablished in 1967

== Albums released ==
=== January ===
Day	Album	Artist	Notes
4	The Doors	The Doors	Debut
9	More of the Monkees	The Monkees	-
13	Soul of Mann	Manfred Mann	-
20	Between the Buttons	The Rolling Stones	UK
23	The Supremes Sing Holland–Dozier–Holland	The Supremes	-
26	Knock on Wood	Eddie Floyd	-
30	The Stone Poneys	The Stone Poneys	Debut
31	Sugar	Nancy Sinatra	-
-	East Broadway Run Down	Sonny Rollins	-
-	More Than a New Discovery	Laura Nyro	Debut
-	Roy Orbison Sings Don Gibson	Roy Orbison	-
-	The Youngbloods	The Youngbloods	Debut

=== February ===
Day	Album	Artist	Notes
1	Surrealistic Pillow	Jefferson Airplane	-
1	Deliver	The Mamas & the Papas	-
6	Younger Than Yesterday	The Byrds	-
10	Mellow Yellow	Donovan	-
10	Trogglodynamite	The Troggs	-
13	Hello, I'm Dolly	Dolly Parton	Debut
16	Miles Smiles	Miles Davis	-
17	A Hard Road	John Mayall & the Bluesbreakers	-
20	Blow-Up Soundtrack	Herbie Hancock	-
27	How Great Thou Art	Elvis Presley	Gospel
-	5 by 5	The Dave Clark Five	US
-	The Electric Prunes	The Electric Prunes	Debut
-	There's a Kind of Hush All Over the World	Herman's Hermits	UK

=== March ===
Day	Album	Artist	Notes
3	Images	The Walker Brothers	-
3	Green, Green Grass of Home	Tom Jones	Decca album
4	I'm a Lonesome Fugitive	Merle Haggard	-
6	Temptations Live!	The Temptations	Live
10	I Never Loved a Man the Way I Love You	Aretha Franklin	-
10	Matthew and Son	Cat Stevens	Debut
10	Johnny Mathis Sings	Johnny Mathis	-
12	The Velvet Underground & Nico	The Velvet Underground	Debut
13	Patsy Cline's Greatest Hits	Patsy Cline	Compilation
16	King & Queen	Otis Redding & Carla Thomas	-
17	The Grateful Dead	Grateful Dead	Debut
20	Nina Simone Sings the Blues	Nina Simone	-
20	Thoroughly Modern Millie	Various Artists	Soundtrack
21	Back Up Train	Al Green	Debut
27	Bob Dylan's Greatest Hits	Bob Dylan	Compilation
30	Club Meeting	Billy Preston	-
-	Eric Is Here	Eric Burdon & the Animals	-
-	Francis Albert Sinatra & Antonio Carlos Jobim	Frank Sinatra, Antonio Carlos Jobim	-
-	James Brown Sings Raw Soul	James Brown	-
-	Waylon Sings Ol' Harlan	Waylon Jennings	

=== April ===
Day	Album	Artist	Notes
10	Born Free	Andy Williams	-
17	Country Fever	Rick Nelson	-
28	Contrast	Tages	-
-	Emotions	The Pretty Things	-
-	Happy Together	The Turtles	-
-	Chuck Berry's Golden Decade	Chuck Berry	Compilation
-	Don't Stop Me Now!	Cliff Richard	-
-	Electric Comic Book	Blues Magoos	-
-	The Electric Prunes	The Electric Prunes	Debut
-	Happiness Is Dean Martin	Dean Martin	-
-	Tim Hardin 2	Tim Hardin	-
-	The Way I Feel	Gordon Lightfoot	-
-	Tony Makes It Happen	Tony Bennett	-

=== May ===
Day	Album	Artist	Notes
1	Sounds Like...	Herb Alpert	-
11	Electric Music for the Mind and Body	Country Joe and the Fish	Debut
12	Are You Experienced	The Jimi Hendrix Experience	Debut
22	Headquarters	The Monkees	-
22	The Supremes Sing Rodgers & Hart	The Supremes	-
26	Absolutely Free	The Mothers of Invention	-
26	Sgt. Pepper's Lonely Hearts Club Band	The Beatles	-
-	Backlash	Freddie Hubbard	-
-	Canciones folklóricas de América	Víctor Jara	-
-	Live at the Garden	James Brown	Live
-	Make Way for Willie Nelson	Willie Nelson	-
-	On Stage and in the Movies	Dionne Warwick	-
-	On the South Side of Chicago	Vic Damone	-
-	Super Psychedelics	The Ventures	-
-	Up, Up and Away	The 5th Dimension	Debut
-	You're a Big Boy Now	The Lovin' Spoonful	Soundtrack
-	The Zodiac: Cosmic Sounds	Paul Beaver	-

=== June ===
Day	Album	Artist	Notes
1	David Bowie	David Bowie	Debut
1	Double Trouble	Elvis Presley	Soundtrack
2	From the Beginning	Small Faces	Compilation
6	Moby Grape	Moby Grape	Debut
8	Insight Out	The Association	-
12	Evergreen, Volume 2	Stone Poneys	-
23	Small Faces	Small Faces	-
26	Flowers	The Rolling Stones	Compilation
26	You Got What It Takes	The Dave Clark Five	US
-	Big Swing Face	Buddy Rich	-
-	Evolution	The Hollies	-
-	The Fastest Guitar Alive	Roy Orbison	Soundtrack
-	Greatest Hits, Vol. 1	Johnny Cash	Compilation
-	Hip Hug-Her	Booker T & the M.G.'s	-
-	James Brown Plays the Real Thing	James Brown	-
-	Leonard Nimoy Presents Mr. Spock's Music from Outer Space	Leonard Nimoy	Debut
-	A Raise of Eyebrows	Ron Geesin	
-	Ray Charles Invites You to Listen	Ray Charles	-
-	Side Trips	Kaleidoscope	Debut
-	This Is My Song	Ray Conniff	-
-	Tom Jones Live!	Tom Jones	-
-	We Are Paintermen	The Creation	Debut

=== July ===
Day	Album	Artist	Notes
10	Jigsaw	The Shadows	-
10	Live in Europe	Otis Redding	Live
14	Bee Gees' 1st	Bee Gees	-
17	The Temptations with a Lot o' Soul	The Temptations	-
21	Ode to Billie Joe	Bobbie Gentry	Debut
24	Best of The Beach Boys Vol. 2	The Beach Boys	Compilation
24	Little Games	The Yardbirds	-
31	Groovin'	The Young Rascals	-
-	The 5000 Spirits or the Layers of the Onion	The Incredible String Band	-
-	Canned Heat	Canned Heat	Debut
-	The Everly Brothers Sing	The Everly Brothers	-
-	Let's Live for Today	The Grass Roots	-
-	The Medium Is the Massage	Marshall McLuhan	
-	Reach Out	Four Tops	-
-	The Sound of Wilson Pickett	Wilson Pickett	-
-	Triangle	The Beau Brummels	-
-	Welcome to My World	Dean Martin	-

=== August ===
Day	Album	Artist	Notes
1	Carryin' On with Johnny Cash and June Carter	Johnny Cash and June Carter	-
1	Spanky and Our Gang	Spanky and Our Gang	Debut
4	Aretha Arrives	Aretha Franklin	-
4	The Piper at the Gates of Dawn	Pink Floyd	Debut
4	Album 1700	Peter, Paul & Mary	-
7	The Byrds' Greatest Hits	The Byrds	Compilation
7	Lumpy Gravy	Frank Zappa	Original release; subsequently reedited and reissued in 1968
7	Revolution!	Paul Revere & the Raiders	Original release; Columbia Records (CS 9521).
23	Big Brother and the Holding Company	Big Brother and the Holding Company	Debut
25	Just for You	Neil Diamond	-
25	Scott	Scott Walker	Debut
28	Branded Man	Merle Haggard	-
28	I Was Made to Love Her	Stevie Wonder	-
29	Greatest Hits	Diana Ross & the Supremes	Compilation
29	Make It Happen	Smokey Robinson & The Miracles	-
29	United	Marvin Gaye and Tammi Terrell	-
31	The Windows of the World	Dionne Warwick	-
–	Alligator Bogaloo	Lou Donaldson	-
–	Symphony for Improvisers	Don Cherry	Feat. Pharoah Sanders, Ed Blackwell & Gato Barbieri
–	Bobby Darin Sings Doctor Dolittle	Bobby Darin	-
–	Born Under a Bad Sign	Albert King	-
–	Brighten the Corner	Ella Fitzgerald	-
–	Chuck Berry in Memphis	Chuck Berry	-
–	Cold Sweat	James Brown	-
–	Goodbye and Hello	Tim Buckley	-
–	Joan	Joan Baez	-
–	Love of the Common People	Waylon Jennings	-
–	Lush Life	Nancy Wilson	-
–	Underground	The Electric Prunes	-
–	Vanilla Fudge	Vanilla Fudge	Debut
–	The World We Knew	Frank Sinatra	-

=== September ===
Day	Album	Artist	Notes
1	Crusade	John Mayall & the Bluesbreakers	-
1	Procol Harum	Procol Harum	Debut
15	Something Else by The Kinks	The Kinks	-
18	Smiley Smile	The Beach Boys	-
25	Strange Days	The Doors	-
-	Alice's Restaurant	Arlo Guthrie	Debut
-	Blowin' Your Mind!	Van Morrison	Debut
-	Everybody Needs Love	Gladys Knight & the Pips	-
-	Hollywood Mon Amour – Great Love Songs from the Movies	Robert Goulet	-
-	It Must Be Him	Vikki Carr	-
-	Live at Fillmore Auditorium	Chuck Berry	Live
-	Martha and the Vandellas Live!	Martha and the Vandellas	Live
-	Safe as Milk	Captain Beefheart	Debut

=== October ===
Day	Album	Artist	Notes
10	Clambake	Elvis Presley	Soundtrack
16	A Christmas Album	Barbra Streisand	Christmas
16	Love, Andy	Andy Williams	-
23	Sorcerer	Miles Davis	-
24	We Are Ever So Clean	Blossom Toes	Debut
25	Easter Everywhere	The 13th Floor Elevators	-
26	Soul Men	Sam & Dave	-
27	Ten Years After	Ten Years After	Debut
27	Where Am I Going?	Dusty Springfield	-
30	Buffalo Springfield Again	Buffalo Springfield	
31	Pleasures of the Harbor	Phil Ochs	-
-	Adam's Apple	Wayne Shorter	-
-	Tauhid	Pharoah Sanders	
-	Chelsea Girl	Nico	Solo Debut
-	Cry Softly Lonely One	Roy Orbison	-
-	The Don Heckman-Ed Summerlin Improvisational Jazz Workshop	Don Heckman and Ed Summerlin	-
-	Gorilla	Bonzo Dog Doo-Dah Band	Debut
-	One Nation Underground	Pearls Before Swine	Debut
-	Sammy Davis Jr. Sings the Complete "Dr. Dolittle"	Sammy Davis, Jr.	-
-	Silk & Soul	Nina Simone	-
-	Simply Streisand	Barbra Streisand	-
-	A Whole New Thing	Sly and the Family Stone	Debut
-	Wildflowers	Judy Collins	-
-	Wave	Antonio Carlos Jobim	-
-	Winds of Change	Eric Burdon & the Animals	-

=== November ===
Day	Album	Artist	Notes
1	Forever Changes	Love	-
6	Pisces, Aquarius, Capricorn & Jones Ltd.	The Monkees	-
10	Disraeli Gears	Cream	-
11	Los Gatos	Los Gatos	Debut
13	Another Side of Rick	Rick Nelson	
17	Days of Future Passed	The Moody Blues	-
20	The Damone Type of Thing	Vic Damone	
24	Tangerine Dream	Kaleidoscope	UK band
27	Magical Mystery Tour	The Beatles	US Album
27	Someday at Christmas	Stevie Wonder	-
27	The Temptations in a Mellow Mood	The Temptations	-
30	After Bathing at Baxter's	Jefferson Airplane	-
-	The Amboy Dukes	The Amboy Dukes	Debut
-	The Blues Alone	John Mayall	-
-	Everybody Knows	The Dave Clark Five	UK
-	Butterfly	The Hollies	-
-	Ella Fitzgerald's Christmas	Ella Fitzgerald	Christmas
-	I-Feel-Like-I'm-Fixin'-to-Die	Country Joe and the Fish	-
-	The One and Only	Waylon Jennings	-
-	The Blues Is Now	Jimmy Witherspoon	-
-	The Time Has Come	The Chambers Brothers	Debut

=== December ===
Day	Album	Artist	Notes
1	Axis: Bold as Love	The Jimi Hendrix Experience	UK
4	Studio	Tages	
6	Everything Playing	The Lovin' Spoonful	
8	A Price on His Head	The Alan Price Set	UK
8	Their Satanic Majesties Request	The Rolling Stones	-
8	Mr. Fantasy	Traffic	Debut
8	Cellophane	The Troggs	-
15	The Who Sell Out	The Who	-
15	New Masters	Cat Stevens	-
18	Wild Honey	The Beach Boys	-
27	John Wesley Harding	Bob Dylan	-
27	Songs of Leonard Cohen	Leonard Cohen	Debut
-	13 Smash Hits	Tom Jones	-
-	Anything Goes	Harpers Bizarre	-
-	For Once in My Life	Tony Bennett	-
-	The Look of Love	Dusty Springfield	-
-	The Magic Garden	The 5th Dimension	-
-	Pandemonium Shadow Show	Harry Nilsson	-
-	The Resurrection of Pigboy Crabshaw	Paul Butterfield Blues Band	-
-	Song Cycle	Van Dyke Parks	Debut
-	Jul med Hep Stars	Hep Stars	-

=== Release date unknown ===
- And We Were Lovers – Shirley Bassey
- Another Story - Ernest Tubb
- Anything Goes! The Dave Brubeck Quartet Plays Cole Porter - Dave Brubeck
- Back Up Train – Al Green
- A Bag Full of Blues - Jimmy McGriff
- Ballads from Deep Gap - Doc Watson and Merle Watson
- Basie's Beat - Count Basie Orchestra
- Beach Samba - Astrud Gilberto
- The Beat of Brazil – Sergio Mendes & Brasil '66
- The Beat Goes On - Herbie Mann
- The Best of Ronnie Dove Volume 2 – Ronnie Dove
- Blaze – Herman's Hermits
- Blues Is King – B. B. King
- Blue Notes - Johnny Hodges
- Bobo Motion - Willie Bobo
- Booker 'n' Brass - Booker Ervin
- 'Bout Changes 'n' Things Take 2 - Eric Andersen
- Browns Sing the Big Ones from Country - The Browns
- Bucket o' Grease - Les McCann Ltd.
- Burning Bridges - Glen Campbell
- By the Time I Get to Phoenix - Glen Campbell
- California Nights - Lesley Gore
- Carryin' On with Johnny Cash & June Carter - Johnny Cash and June Carter Cash
- Cauldron – Fifty Foot Hose
- Casino Royale – Burt Bacharach
- Cherry Red - Eddie Vinson
- Chet - Chet Atkins
- Chicken Fat - Mel Brown
- Chocomotive - Houston Person
- Christmas with Anita Bryant – Anita Bryant
- Chuck Berry's Golden Hits - Chuck Berry
- Clear Light – Clear Light
- Cliff in Japan – Cliff Richard
- The Cold Hard Facts of Life - Porter Wagoner
- Colour My World – Petula Clark
- Connie in the Country - Connie Smith
- Connie Smith Sings Bill Anderson - Connie Smith
- Conquistador! – Cecil Taylor
- Contours - Sam Rivers
- The Country Way - Charley Pride
- Creole Cookin' - Bobby Hackett
- Cry (Ronnie Dove album) – Ronnie Dove
- Daktari - Shelly Manne
- Dave Van Ronk and the Hudson Dusters - Dave Van Ronk
- A Day in the Life – Wes Montgomery
- Days Have Gone By - John Fahey
- Doktor Dolittle – Fred Åkerström
- Double Dynamite – Sam & Dave
- A Drop of the Hard Stuff – The Dubliners
- Earthwords & Music - John Hartford
- Ella and Duke at the Cote D'Azur – Ella Fitzgerald and Duke Ellington
- Emotions – The Pretty Things
- Evil – Howlin' Wolf
- Extra Special! – Peggy Lee
- The Far East Suite – Duke Ellington
- Feelin' Groovy – Harper's Bizarre
- The First Edition – Kenny Rogers and the First Edition
- For All the Seasons of Your Mind – Janis Ian
- From Sergio – With Love – Sergio Franchi
- Future – The Seeds
- Gene Clark with the Gosdin Brothers – Gene Clark
- H. P. Lovecraft – H. P. Lovecraft
- High Priestess of Soul – Nina Simone
- Hour Glass – Hour Glass
- I Think We're Alone Now – Tommy James and the Shondells
- Incense and Peppermints – Strawberry Alarm Clock
- Inner Views – Sonny Bono
- Introducing the Sonics – The Sonics
- Juicy – Willie Bobo
- Just for You – Neil Diamond
- Knock on Wood – Eddie Floyd
- The Last Waltz – Engelbert Humperdick
- Left My Blues in San Francisco – Buddy Guy
- The Letter/Neon Rainbow – The Box Tops
- Live! At Caesar's Palace – Checkmates, Ltd.
- Live at the Fillmore Auditorium – Chuck Berry
- Looks at Life - John Hartford
- Ludo – Ivor Cutler Trio
- The Marvelettes – The Marvelettes
- Mixed Bag – Richie Havens
- More of the Hard Stuff – The Dubliners
- Morning Dew – Tim Rose
- Nice Girls Don't Stay for Breakfast – Julie London
- The Nitty Gritty Dirt Band – Nitty Gritty Dirt Band
- No Way Out – The Chocolate Watchband
- The Original Spinners – The Spinners
- Out of Different Bags - Marlena Shaw
- The Parable of Arable Land – The Red Crayola
- The Party's Over and Other Great Willie Nelson Songs – Willie Nelson
- Ptooff! – The Deviants
- Reach Out – Burt Bacharach
- The Real McCoy – McCoy Tyner
- Reflections – Terry Knight and the Pack
- Release Me – Engelbert Humperdinck
- Revolution! – Paul Revere & the Raiders
- Ricochet – Nitty Gritty Dirt Band
- Safe As Milk – Captain Beefheart and his Magic Band
- Say Siegel-Schwall – Siegel-Schwall Band
- Seen in Green – The Seekers
- Shake Down – Savoy Brown
- Songs for Rainy Day Lovers – Clare Fischer
- The Story of Simon Simopath – Nirvana
- The Soul of a Bell – William Bell
- Straight, No Chaser – Thelonious Monk
- Strictly Instrumental – Lester Flatt, Earl Scruggs and Doc Watson
- Super Blues – Bo Diddley, Muddy Waters & Little Walter
- Supernatural Fairy Tales – Art
- The Super Super Blues Band – Bo Diddley, Muddy Waters & Howlin' Wolf
- These Are My Songs – Petula Clark
- There Goes My Heart – Sergio Franchi
- The Thoughts of Emerlist Davjack – The Nice
- Today My Way - Patti Page
- The Trip – Electric Flag (Soundtrack)
- Víctor Jara – Víctor Jara
- Waist Deep in the Big Muddy – Pete Seeger
- Walk Through This World with Me – George Jones
- Walkin' in the Sunshine - Roger Miller
- Waterhole #3 (Code of the West) - Roger Miller
- We Are Ever So Clean – Blossom Toes
- The West Coast Pop Art Experimental Band Part One – The West Coast Pop Art Experimental Band
- West Side Soul – Magic Sam
- Whisper Not – Ella Fitzgerald
- With Body & Soul – Julie London
- You Got My Mind Messed Up – James Carr

== Billboard Top popular records of 1967 ==
The completed Billboard year-end list for 1967 is composed of records that entered the Billboard Hot 100 between November 1966 and December 1967. Records with chart runs that started in 1966 and ended in 1967, or started in 1967 and ended in 1968, made this chart if the majority of their chart weeks were in 1967. If not, they were ranked in the year-end charts for 1966 or 1968. If their weeks were equal, they were listed in the year they first entered. Appearing in multiple years is not permitted. Each week thirty points were awarded to the number one record, then nineteen points for number two, eighteen points for number three, and so on. The total points a record earned determined its year-end rank. The complete chart life of each record is represented, with number of points accrued. There are no ties, even when multiple records have the same number of points. The next ranking category is peak chart position, then weeks at peak chart position, weeks in top ten, weeks in top forty, and finally weeks on Hot 100 chart.

The chart can be sorted by Artist, Song title, Recording and Release dates, Cashbox year-end ranking (CB) or units sold (sales) by clicking on the column header. Additional details for each record can be accessed by clicking on the song title, and referring to the Infobox in the right column of the song page. Billboard also has chart summaries on its website. Cashbox rankings were derived by same process as the Billboard rankings. Sales information was derived from the RIAA's Gold and Platinum database, the BRIT Certified database and The Book of Golden Discs, but numbers listed should be regarded as estimates. Grammy Hall of Fame and National Recording Registry information with sources can be found on Wikipedia. Archived issues of Billboard from November 1966 to March 1968 and Hot 100 Year-End formulas were used to complete the 1967 year-end chart published December 30, 1967.

Rank	Artist	Title	Label	Recorded	Release date	CB	Sales	Charts, Awards
1	Lulu	"To Sir With Love"	Epic 10187	1967	June 2, 1967	3	2.00	US Billboard 1967 #1, Hot100 #1 for 5 weeks, 17 total weeks, 237 points
2	The Monkees	"Daydream Believer"	Colgems 1012	August 9, 1967	October 25, 1967	4	2.00	US Billboard 1967 #2, Hot100 #1 for 4 weeks, 12 total weeks, 219 points
3	The Association	"Windy"	Warner Bros. 7041	April 13, 1967	May 1, 1967	6	1.50	US Billboard 1967 #3, Hot100 #1 for 4 weeks, 14 total weeks, 213 points
4	Bobbie Gentry	"Ode to Billie Joe"	Capitol 5950	July 1966	July 10, 1967	2	3.00	US Billboard 1967 #4, Hot100 #1 for 4 weeks, 14 total weeks, 212 points, Grammy Hall of Fame 1999
5	The Young Rascals	"Groovin'"	Atlantic 2401	March 27, 1967	April 10, 1967	5	1.25	US Billboard 1967 #5, Hot100 #1 for 4 weeks, 13 total weeks, 212 points, Grammy Hall of Fame 1999
6	The Box Tops	"The Letter"	Mala 565	March 1966	August 1967	1	4.00	US Billboard 1967 #6, Hot100 #1 for 4 weeks, 16 total weeks, 206 points, Grammy Hall of Fame 2011
7	The Doors	"Light My Fire"	Elektra 45615	August 1966	April 24, 1967	17	1.25	Top Rock Tracks 1967 #1, US Billboard 1967 #7, Hot100 #1 for 3 weeks, 17 total weeks, 206 points, Grammy Hall of Fame 1998, National Recording Registry 2022
8	Nancy Sinatra & Frank Sinatra	"Somethin' Stupid"	Reprise 0561	February 1, 1967	March 1967	9	4.00	US Billboard 1967 #8, Hot100 #1 for 4 weeks, 13 total weeks, 204 points, Top Easy Listening Singles 1967 #1, Easy Listening Singles #1 for 9 weeks, 17 total weeks, 350 points
9	The Turtles	"Happy Together"	White Whale 244	January 1967	January 25, 1967	7	1.25	US Billboard 1967 #9, Hot100 #1 for 3 weeks, 15 total weeks, 199 points, Grammy Hall of Fame 2007
10	The Beatles	"Hello Goodbye"	Capitol 2056	October–November 2, 1967	November 27, 1967	11	3.00	US Billboard 1967 #10, Hot100 #1 for 3 weeks, 11 total weeks, 181 points
11	Strawberry Alarm Clock	"Incense and Peppermints"	Uni 55018	March 1967	May 19, 1967	20	2.00	US Billboard 1967 #11, Hot100 #1 for 1 week, 16 total weeks, 170 points
12	The Buckinghams	"Kind of a Drag"	USA 860	October 1966	December 1966	38	1.50	US Billboard 1967 #12, Hot100 #1 for 2 weeks, 13 total weeks, 163 points
13	Aretha Franklin	"Respect"	Atlantic 2403	February 14, 1967	April 29, 1967	8	3.00	US Billboard 1967 #13, Hot100 #1 for 2 weeks, 12 total weeks, 163 points, Top Soul Singles 1967 #2, Hot Soul Singles #1 for 8 weeks, 14 total weeks, 294 points, Grammy Hall of Fame 1998
14	Frankie Valli	"Can't Take My Eyes Off You"	Philips 40446	March 1967	April 1967	10	1.25	US Billboard 1967 #14, Hot100 #2 for 1 week, 16 total weeks, 153 points
15	The Beatles	"All You Need Is Love"	Capitol 5964	June 14, 1967	July 17, 1967	14	3.00	US Billboard 1967 #15, Hot100 #1 for 1 week, 11 total weeks, 150 points
16	The Rolling Stones	"Ruby Tuesday"	London 901	November 1966	January 13, 1967	12	1.50	US Billboard 1967 #16, Hot100 #1 for 1 week, 12 total weeks, 149 points
17	The Supremes	"Love Is Here and Now You're Gone"	Motown 1101	November 13, 1966	January 11, 1967	25	1.50	US Billboard 1967 #17, Hot100 #1 for 1 week, 11 total weeks, 149 points, Top Soul Singles 1967 #13, Hot Soul Singles #1 for 2 weeks, 11 total weeks, 169 points
18	Gladys Knight and the Pips	"I Heard It Through the Grapevine"	Soul 35039	June 17, 1967	September 28, 1967	16	1.25	US Billboard 1967 #18, Hot100 #2 for 3 weeks, 17 total weeks, 149 points, Top Soul Singles 1967 #3, Hot Soul Singles #1 for 6 weeks, 17 total weeks, 278 points, Grammy Hall of Fame 2018
19	Sam and Dave	"Soul Man"	Stax 231	1967	September 1967	21	1.25	US Billboard 1967 #19, Hot100 #2 for 3 weeks, 15 total weeks, 148 points, Top Soul Singles 1967 #1, Hot Soul Singles #1 for 7 weeks, 18 total weeks, 301 points, Grammy Hall of Fame 1999
20	Stevie Wonder	"I Was Made to Love Her"	Tamla 54151	1967	May 18, 1967	32	1.25	US Billboard 1967 #20, Hot100 #2 for 2 weeks, 15 total weeks, 148 points, Top Soul Singles 1967 #6, Hot Soul Singles #1 for 4 weeks, 15 total weeks, 255 points
21	The Music Explosion	"Little Bit O' Soul"	Laurie 3380	1967	April 1967	30	2.00	US Billboard 1967 #21, Hot100 #2 for 2 weeks, 16 total weeks, 145 points
22	The Association	"Never My Love"	Warner Bros. 7074	May 1967	August 9, 1967	24	1.50	US Billboard 1967 #22, Hot100 #2 for 2 weeks, 14 total weeks, 145 points
23	The Cowsills	"The Rain, the Park & Other Things"	MGM 13810	August 17, 1967	September 1967	18	1.00	US Billboard 1967 #23, Hot100 #2 for 2 weeks, 16 total weeks, 140 points
24	The Seekers	"Georgy Girl"	Capitol 5756	April 11, 1966	October 10, 1966	19	1.00	US Billboard 1967 #24, Hot100 #2 for 2 weeks, 16 total weeks, 140 points
25	Smokey Robinson and the Miracles	"I Second That Emotion"	Tamla 54159	April 19, 1966	October 19, 1967	40	1.00	US Billboard 1967 #25, Hot100 #4 for 3 weeks, 15 total weeks, 140 points, Top Soul Singles 1967 #10, Hot Soul Singles #1 for 1 week, 15 total weeks, 215 points
26	The Royal Guardsmen	"Snoopy Vs. The Red Baron"	Laurie 3366	October 1966	November 1966	26	1.25	US Billboard 1967 #26, Hot100 #2 for 4 weeks, 12 total weeks, 139 points, Grammy Hall of Fame 1998, National Recording Registry 2017
27	Aaron Neville	"Tell It Like It Is"	Par-Lo 101	August 20, 1966	November 9, 1966	34	1.00	US Billboard 1967 #27, Hot100 #2 for 1 weeks, 14 total weeks, 139 points, Top Soul Singles 1967 #4, Hot Soul Singles #1 for 5 weeks, 17 total weeks, 264 points, Grammy Hall of Fame 2015
28	Arthur Conley	"Sweet Soul Music"	Atco 6463	December 1966	February 1967	46	1.00	US Billboard 1967 #28, Hot100 #2 for 1 week, 15 total weeks, 129 points
29	Bobby Vee and The Strangers	"Come Back When You Grow Up"	Liberty 55964	December 1965	June 9, 1967	35	1.00	US Billboard 1967 #29, Hot100 #3 for 3 week, 16 total weeks, 129 points
30	The Beatles	"Penny Lane"	Capitol 5810	Dec 1966 to Jan 17, 1967	February 13, 1967	15	2.50	US Billboard 1967 #30, Hot100 #1 for 1 week, 10 total weeks, 123 points, Grammy Hall of Fame 2011
31	The Supremes	"The Happening"	Motown 1107	January 1967	March 20, 1967	22	1.50	US Billboard 1967 #31, Hot100 #1 for 1 week, 11 total weeks, 123 points, Grammy Hall of Fame 1999
32	Diana Ross and the Supremes	"Reflections"	Motown 1111	March 2 and May 9, 1967	July 24, 1967	31	1.50	US Billboard 1967 #32, Hot100 #2 for 2 weeks, 11 total weeks, 118 points
33	Tommy James and the Shondells	"I Think We're Alone Now"	Roulette 4720	December 1966	January 5, 1967	39	1.80	US Billboard 1967 #33, Hot100 #4 for 1 weeks, 17 total weeks, 110 points
34	The Four Tops	"Bernadette"	Motown 1104	January 21, 1967	March 11, 1967	86	2.00	US Billboard 1967 #34, Hot100 #4 for 2 weeks, 10 total weeks, 106 points
35	Procol Harum	"A Whiter Shade of Pale"	Deram 7507	April 1967	May 12, 1967	59	6.00	Top Rock Tracks 1967 #7, US Billboard 1967 #35, Hot100 #5 for 2 weeks, 12 total weeks, 106 points, Grammy Hall of Fame 1998
36	The Mamas and The Papas	"Dedicated to the One I Love"	Dunhill 4077	November 26, 1966	February 1967	27	1.80	US Billboard 1967 #36, Hot100 #2 for 3 weeks, 10 total weeks, 105 points
37	Scott McKenzie	"San Francisco (Be Sure to Wear Flowers in Your Hair)"	Ode 7-103	December 1966	May 13, 1967	43	7.00	US Billboard 1967 #37, Hot100 #4 for 4 weeks, 12 total weeks, 105 points
38	Blues Magoos	"(We Ain't Got) Nothin' Yet"	Mercury 72622	May 1966	October 1966	71	2.00	Top Rock Tracks 1967 #10, US Billboard 1967 #38, Hot100 #5 for 2 weeks, 14 total weeks, 104 points
39	The Soul Survivors	"Expressway to Your Heart"	Crimson 1010	1967	July 1967	83	1.80	US Billboard 1967 #39, Hot100 #4 for 1 weeks, 15 total weeks, 103 points
40	The Monkees	"A Little Bit Me, a Little Bit You"	Colgems 1004	January 21, 1967	March 8, 1967	13	2.00	US Billboard 1967 #40, Hot100 #2 for 1 week, 10 total weeks, 101 points

=== Billboard Top Soul Singles 1967 ===
Rank	Artist	Title	Label	Recorded	Release date	CB	Sales	Charts, Awards
1	Sam and Dave	"Soul Man"						see number 19
2	Aretha Franklin	"Respect"						see number 13
3	Gladys Knight and the Pips	"I Heard It Through The Grapevine"						see number 18
4	Aaron Neville	"Tell It Like It Is"						see number 27
5	Aretha Franklin	"I Never Loved a Man (The Way I Love You)"	Atlantic 2386	January 24, 1967	February 10, 1967	44	2.00	US Billboard 1967 #89, Hot100 #9 for 2 weeks, 11 total weeks, 53 points, Top Soul Singles 1967 #5, Hot Soul Singles #1 for 7 weeks, 14 total weeks, 262 points

=== Billboard Top Country Singles 1967 ===
Rank	Artist	Title	Label	Recorded	Release date	CB	Sales	Charts, Awards
1	Jack Greene	"All The Time"	Decca 32123	1967	July 1967		1.80	US Billboard 1967 #762, Hot100 #103 for 1 week, 3 total weeks, Top Country Singles 1967 #1, Country Singles #1 for 5 weeks, 20 total weeks, 275 points.
2	Sonny James	"It's The Little Things"	Epic 10398	August 28, 1967	September 20, 1967	179	1.00	US Billboard 1967 #155, Hot100 #19 for 1 week, 16 total weeks, 4 points, Top Country Singles 1967 #2, Country Singles #1 for 5 weeks, 18 total weeks, 253 points, Grammy Hall of Fame 1999, National Recording Registry 2010
3	Bill Anderson and Jan Howard	"For Loving You"	Epic 10315	August 28, 1967	September 20, 1967	179	1.00	US Billboard 1967 #427, Hot100 #63 for 1 week, 6 total weeks, Top Country Singles 1967 #3, Country Singles #1 for 4 weeks, 20 total weeks, 245 points
4	David Houston and Tammy Wynette	"My Elusive Dreams"	Epic 10194	June 1, 1967	June 1967	187	1.00	US Billboard 1967 #230, Hot100 #32 for 3 weeks, 12 total weeks, Top Country Singles 1967 #4, Country Singles #1 for 2 weeks, 18 total weeks, 229 points, National Recording Registry 2003
5	Glen Campbell	"By The Time I Get To Phoenix"	Capitol 2015	August 29, 1967	October 23, 1967	226	2.00	US Billboard 1967 #229, Hot100 #26 for 1 week, 11 total weeks, Top Country Singles 1967 #5, Country Singles #2 for 2 weeks, 18 total weeks, 218 points, Grammy Hall of Fame 2004

=== Billboard Top Easy Listening Singles 1967 ===
Rank	Artist	Title	Label	Recorded	Release date	CB	Sales	Charts, Awards
1	Nancy Sinatra and Frank Sinatra	"Somethin' Stupid"						see number 8
2	Ed Ames	"My Cup Runneth Over"	RCA Victor 9002	September 28, 1966	November 1966	91	2.00	US Billboard 1967 #82, Hot100 #8 for 1 week, 13 total weeks, 57 points, Top Easy Listening Singles 1967 #2, Easy Listening Singles #1 for 4 weeks, 23 total weeks, 300 points
3	Jack Jones	"Lady"	Kapp 800	December 1966	January 5, 1967	269	1.00	US Billboard 1967 #311, Hot100 #39 for 2 weeks, 11 total weeks, Top Easy Listening Singles 1967 #3, Easy Listening Singles #1 for 4 weeks, 18 total weeks, 294 points
4	Vikki Carr	"It Must Be Him"	Liberty 55986	September 10, 1967	September 18, 1967	50	1.00	US Billboard 1967 #45, Hot100 #3 for 2 weeks, 15 total weeks, Top Easy Listening Singles 1967 #4, Easy Listening Singles #1 for 3 weeks, 19 total weeks, 258 points
5	Roger Williams	"More Than A Miracle"	Kapp 843	July 1967	August 1967		1.00	US Billboard 1967 #792, Hot100 #108 for 1 week, 4 total weeks, Top Easy Listening Singles 1967 #5, Easy Listening Singles #2 for 4 weeks, 19 total weeks, 249 points

=== Billboard Top Rock Tracks 1967 (unofficial) ===
Rank	Artist	Title	Label	Recorded	Release date	CB	Sales	Charts, Awards
1	The Doors	"Light My Fire"						see number 7, from The Doors - Elektra 74007
2	The Jimi Hendrix Experience	"Purple Haze"	Reprise 0597	February 8, 1967	June 19, 1967	451	2.00	US Billboard 1967 #163, Hot100 #20 for 2 weeks, 9 total weeks, 4 points, Top Rock Tracks 1967 #2, Grammy Hall of Fame 2001, from Are You Experienced? - Reprise 6261 (Original North American edition).
3	The Beatles	"A Day In The Life"	Capitol 2653	September 5–6, 1967	November 22, 1967			Top Rock Tracks 1967 #3, from Sgt. Pepper's Lonely Hearts Club Band - Capitol 2653.
4	The Who	"I Can See For Miles"	Decca 32206	August 7, 1967	September 18, 1967	92	1.25	Top Rock Tracks 1967 #4, from The Who Sell Out - Decca 74950
5	Traffic	"Dear Mr. Fantasy"	United Artists 6651	November 5, 1967	December 8, 1967			Top Rock Tracks 1967 #5, from Mr. Fantasy - United Artists 6651
6	The Jimi Hendrix Experience	"Hey Joe"	Polydor 56139	October 23, 1966	December 16, 1966			Top Rock Tracks 1967 #6, US Billboard 1967 #163, Hot100 #20 for 2 weeks, 9 total weeks, 4 points, Top Rock Tracks 1967 #6, Grammy Hall of Fame 2001, from Are You Experienced - Reprise 6261 (Original North American edition).
7	Procol Harum	"A Whiter Shade of Pale"						see number 35, from Deram single 7507.
8	The Beatles	"Strawberry Fields Forever"	Capitol 5810	December 22, 1966	February 13, 1967	115	2.50	Top Rock Tracks 1967 #8, US Billboard 1967 #84, Hot100 #8 for 1 week, 9 total weeks, 123 points, Grammy Hall of Fame 2011, from Capitol single 5810.
9	Small Faces	"Itchycoo Park"	Immediate 501	April 1967	May 12, 1967	109	6.00	Top Rock Tracks 1967 #9, US Billboard 1967 #117, Hot100 #16 for 3 weeks, 17 total weeks, 106 points, Grammy Hall of Fame 1998, from There Are But Four Small Faces - Immediate 52002
10	Blues Magoos	"(We Ain't Got) Nothin' Yet"						see number 38, from Psychedelic Lollipop - Mercury 21096

== Top American hits on record ==
w. = words, m. = music

Single – Artist	Composer
Winter
"Snoopy vs. the Red Baron" – The Royal Guardsmen	w.m. Phil Gernhard and Richard Holler
"Tell It Like It Is" – Aaron Neville	w.m. George Davis and Lee Diamond
"Winchester Cathedral" – The New Vaudeville Band	w.m. Geoff Stephens
"Sugar Town" – Nancy Sinatra	w.m. Lee Hazlewood
"That's Life" – Frank Sinatra	w.m. Dean Kay and Kelly Gordon
"Good Thing" – Paul Revere & the Raiders	w.m. Mark Lindsay and Terry Melcher
"Words of Love" – The Mamas & the Papas	w.m. John Phillips
"Standing in the Shadows of Love" – Four Tops	w.m. Brian Holland, Lamont Dozier and Eddie Holland
"Let's Spend the Night Together"/"Ruby Tuesday" – The Rolling Stones	w.m. Mick Jagger and Keith Richards
"Mellow Yellow" – Donovan	w.m. Donovan
"Georgy Girl" – The Seekers	w. Jim Dale m. Tom Springfield
"Nashville Cats" – The Lovin' Spoonful	w.m. John Sebastian
"Tell It to the Rain – The Four Seasons	w.m. Mike Petrillo and Angelo Cifelli
"Kind of a Drag" – The Buckinghams	w.m. Jim Holvay
"(We Ain't Got) Nothin' Yet" – Blues Magoos	w.m. Ronnie Gilbert, Ralph Scala and Mike Esposito
"98.6" – Keith	w.m. George Fischoff and Tony Powers
"Love Is Here and Now You're Gone" – The Supremes	w.m. Brian Holland, Lamont Dozier and Eddie Holland
"The Beat Goes On" – Sonny and Cher	w.m. Sonny Bono
"Gimme Some Lovin'" – The Spencer Davis Group	w.m. Steve Winwood, Muff Winwood and Spencer Davis
"Then You Can Tell Me Goodbye" – The Casinos	w.m. John D. Loudermilk
"Baby I Need Your Loving" – Johnny Rivers	w.m. Brian Holland, Lamont Dozier and Eddie Holland
"Sock It to Me, Baby" – Mitch Ryder and the Detroit Wheels	w.m. Bob Crewe and L. Russell Brown
"Penny Lane"/"Strawberry Fields Forever" – The Beatles	w.m. John Lennon and Paul McCartney
"Happy Together" – The Turtles	w.m. Gary Bonner and Alan Gordon
"My Cup Runneth Over" – Ed Ames	w. Tom Jones m. Harvey Schmidt
"There's a Kind of Hush" – Herman's Hermits	w.m. Les Reed and Geoff Stephens
"For What It's Worth" – Buffalo Springfield	w.m. Stephen Stills
"Dedicated to the One I Love" – The Mamas & the Papas	w.m. Lowman Pauling and Ralph Bass
.
Spring
"Bernadette" – Four Tops	w.m. Brian Holland, Lamont Dozier and Eddie Holland
"Incense and Peppermints" – Strawberry Alarm Clock	w.m. John S. Carter, Tim Gilbert
"This Is My Song" – Petula Clark	w.m. Charlie Chaplin
"Something Stupid" – Frank Sinatra and Nancy Sinatra	w.m. C. Carson Parks
"Western Union" – The Five Americans	w.m. Mike Rabon, Norman Ezell and John Durrill
"I Think We're Alone Now" – Tommy James and the Shondells	w.m. Ritchie Cordell
"A Little Bit Me, A Little Bit You" – The Monkees	w.m. Neil Diamond
"One More Mountain to Climb" - Ronnie Dove	w.m. Al Kasha and Joel Hirschhorn
"I Never Loved a Man the Way I Love You" – Aretha Franklin	w.m. Ronnie Shannon
"Jimmy Mack" – Martha and the Vandellas	w.m. Brian Holland, Lamont Dozier and Eddie Holland
"Sweet Soul Music" – Arthur Conley	w.m. Sam Cooke, Arthur Conley and Otis Redding
"The Happening" – The Supremes	w.m. Brian Holland, Lamont Dozier, Eddie Holland and Frank DeVol
"Don't You Care" – The Buckinghams	w.m. Gary Beisbier and Jim Holvay
"Close Your Eyes" – Peaches & Herb	w.m. Chuck Willis
"You Got What It Takes" – The Dave Clark Five	w.m. Berry Gordy, Roquel Davis and Gwen Gordy Fuqua
"I'm a Man" – The Spencer Davis Group	w.m. Jimmy Miller and Steve Winwood
"Groovin'" – The Young Rascals	w.m. Eddie Brigati and Felix Cavaliere
"I Got Rhythm" – The Happenings	w. Ira Gershwin m. George Gershwin
"Respect" – Aretha Franklin	w.m. Otis Redding
"Release Me" – Engelbert Humperdinck	w.m. Robert Yount, Eddie Miller and Dub Williams
"Him or Me – What's It Gonna Be?" – Paul Revere & the Raiders	w.m. Mark Lindsay and Terry Melcher
"Girl, You'll Be a Woman Soon" – Neil Diamond	w.m. Neil Diamond
"Somebody to Love" – Jefferson Airplane	w.m. Grace Slick
"All I Need Is You" – The Temptations	w.m. Eddie Holland, R. Dean Taylor and Frank Wilson
"She'd Rather Be with Me" – The Turtles	w.m. Gary Bonner and Alan Gordon
"Little Bit O'Soul" – The Music Explosion	w.m. John Carter and Ken Lewis
"Windy" – The Association	w.m. Ruthann Friedman
"Mirage" – Tommy James & the Shondells	w.m. Ritchie Cordell and Bo Gentry
.
Summer
"San Francisco (Be Sure to Wear Flowers in Your Hair)" – Scott McKenzie	w.m. John Phillips
"Can't Take My Eyes Off You" – Frankie Valli	w.m. Bob Crewe and Bob Gaudio
"Creeque Alley" – The Mamas & the Papas	w.m. John Phillips and Michelle Phillips
"Sunday Will Never Be the Same" – Spanky and Our Gang	w.m. Terry Cashman and Gene Pistilli
"Let's Live for Today" – The Grass Roots	w.m. David Shapiro and Mogol, translated w. Michael Julien
"Come on Down to My Boat" – Every Mother's Son	w.m. Wes Farrell and Jerry Goldstein
"Don't Sleep in the Subway" – Petula Clark	w.m. Jackie Trent and Tony Hatch
"Up, Up and Away" – The 5th Dimension	w.m. Jimmy Webb
"The Tracks of My Tears" – Johnny Rivers	w.m. Smokey Robinson, Warren Moore and Marv Tarplin
"C'mon Marianne" – The Four Seasons	w.m. Ray Bloodworth and L. Russell Brown
"I Was Made to Love Her" – Stevie Wonder	w.m. Henry Cosby, Lula Mae Hardaway, Sylvia Moy and Stevie Wonder
"White Rabbit" – Jefferson Airplane	w.m. Grace Slick
"Pleasant Valley Sunday" – The Monkees	w.m. Gerry Goffin and Carole King
"Carrie-Anne" – The Hollies	w.m. Tony Hicks, Allan Clarke and Graham Nash
"A Girl Like You" – The Young Rascals	w.m. Eddie Brigati and Felix Cavaliere
"Baby I Love You" – Aretha Franklin	w.m. Ronnie Shannon
"Ode to Billie Joe" – Bobbie Gentry	w.m. Bobbie Gentry
"Reflections" – Diana Ross & the Supremes	w.m. Brian Holland, Lamont Dozier and Eddie Holland
"You're My Everything (The Temptations song)" – The Temptations	w.m. Norman Whitfield, Roger Penzabene and Cornelius Grant
"Come Back When You Grow Up" – Bobby Vee and the Strangers	w.m. Martha Sharp
"The Letter" – Box Tops	w.m. Wayne Carson Thompson
"Apples, Peaches, Pumpkin Pie" – Jay & the Techniques	w.m. Maurice Irby
"San Franciscan Nights" – Eric Burdon & the Animals	w.m. Eric Burdon, John Weider, Barry Jenkins, Danny McCulloch and Vic Briggs
"Funky Broadway" – Wilson Pickett	w.m. Arlester Christian
"Never My Love" – The Association	w.m. Donald Addrisi and Richard Addrisi
"Higher and Higher" – Jackie Wilson	w.m. Gary Jackson, Raynard Miner, Carl William Smith
"I Dig Rock and Roll Music" – Peter, Paul and Mary	w.m. Paul Stookey, James Mason and Dave Dixon
.
Autumn
"Brown Eyed Girl" – Van Morrison	w.m. Van Morrison
"Little Ole Man" – Bill Cosby	w. Bill Cosby, w.m. Henry Cosby, Stevie Wonder and Sylvia May
"How Can I Be Sure" – The Young Rascals	w.m. Eddie Brigati and Felix Cavaliere
"Gimme Little Sign" – Brenton Wood	w.m. Alfred Smith, Joe Hooven and Hal Winn
"Green Tambourine" - The Lemon Pipers	w.m. Paul Leka and Shelley Pinz
"To Sir, with Love" – Lulu	w. Don Black m. Mark London
"Soul Man" – Sam and Dave	w.m. Isaac Hayes and David Porter
"Expressway to Your Heart" – The Soul Survivors	w.m. Leon Huff, Kenneth Gamble and Donald Storball
"It Must Be Him" – Vikki Carr	w. Maurice Vidalin trans. Mack David m. Gilbert Bécaud
"Your Precious Love" – Marvin Gaye and Tammi Terrell	w.m. Nickolas Ashford and Valerie Simpson
"(You Make Me Feel Like) A Natural Woman" – Aretha Franklin	w.m. Carole King
"The Rain, The Park and Other Things" – The Cowsills	w.m. Artie Kornfeld and Steve Duboff
"Please Love Me Forever" – Bobby Vinton	w.m. Johnny Malone and Ollie Blanchard
"I Say a Little Prayer" – Dionne Warwick	w. Hal David m. Burt Bacharach
"I Can See for Miles" – The Who	w.m. Pete Townshend
"Daydream Believer" – The Monkees	w.m. John Stewart
"I Heard It Through the Grapevine" – Gladys Knight & the Pips	w.m. Norman Whitfield and Barrett Strong
"An Open Letter to my Teenage Son" – Victor Lundberg	w. Victor Lundberg
"I Second That Emotion" – Smokey Robinson & the Miracles	w.m. Smokey Robinson and Arthur Cleveland
"Hello, Goodbye" – The Beatles	w.m. John Lennon and Paul McCartney
"In and out of Love" – Diana Ross & the Supremes	w.m. Brian Holland, Lamont Dozier and Eddie Holland
"Boogaloo Down Broadway" – The Fantastic Johnny C	w.m. Jesse James
"You Better Sit Down, Kids" – Cher	w.m. Sonny Bono
"Woman, Woman" – Gary Puckett & The Union Gap	w.m. Jim Glaser and Jimmy Payne
"Judy in Disguise (with Glasses)" – John Fred & His Playboy Band	w.m. John Fred and Andrew Bernard
"Chain of Fools" – Aretha Franklin	w.m. Don Covay
"Bend Me, Shape Me" – The American Breed	w.m. Scott English and Larry Weiss
"Skinny Legs and All" – Joe Tex	w.m. Joe Tex

== British number one hits not included above ==
- "Puppet on a String" – Sandie Shaw
- "Silence Is Golden" – The Tremeloes
- "The Last Waltz" – Engelbert Humperdinck
- "Massachusetts" – Bee Gees
- "Baby Now That I've Found You" – The Foundations
- "Let the Heartaches Begin" – Long John Baldry

== Other hit singles ==
- "7-Rooms of Gloom" – Four Tops
- "Ain't No Mountain High Enough" – Marvin Gaye and Tammi Terrell
- "Al Capone" – Prince Buster
- "And Get Away" – The Esquires
- "Alfie" – Dionne Warwick
- "Seven Drunken Nights" – The Dubliners
- "At the Zoo"/"The 59th Street Bridge Song (Feelin' Groovy)" – Simon & Garfunkel
- "Autumn Almanac" – The Kinks
- "Bang Bang (My Baby Shot Me Down)" – Nancy Sinatra
- "Black Velvet Band" – The Dubliners
- "The Boat That I Row" – Lulu
- "Bottle of Wine" – The Fireballs
- "California Nights" – Lesley Gore (m. Marvin Hamlisch w. Howard Liebling)
- "Darling Be Home Soon" – The Lovin' Spoonful
- "The Day I Met Marie" – Cliff Richard
- "Death of a Clown" – Dave Davies
- "Down On Me" – Big Brother and The Holding Company
- "Even The Bad Times Are Good" – The Tremeloes
- "Everybody Knows" – Dave Clark Five
- "Flowers in the Rain" – The Move
- "For Your Love" – Peaches & Herb
- "Friday on My Mind" – The Easybeats
- "From the Underworld" – The Herd
- "Get on Up" – The Esquires
- "Gettin' Together" – Tommy James and the Shondells
- "Gimme Little Sign" – Brenton Wood
- "Good Times" – Eric Burdon & the Animals
- "Guns of Naverone" – The Skatalites
- "Excerpt from 'A Teenage Opera'" – Keith West
- "Happy Jack" – The Who
- "Here Comes My Baby" – The Tremeloes
- "Heroes and Villains" – The Beach Boys
- "Hole in My Shoe" – Traffic
- "Homburg" – Procol Harum
- "I Am The Walrus" – The Beatles
- "I Feel Love Comin' On" – Felice Taylor
- "I Know You Love Me Not" – Julie Driscoll
- "I Take It Back" – Sandy Posey
- "(I Wanna) Testify" – The Parliaments
- "If I Could Choose – Sean Dunphy
- "(I'm Not Your) Steppin' Stone" – The Monkees
- "I'm Wondering" – Stevie Wonder
- "It Takes Two" – Marvin Gaye and Kim Weston
- "I've Been Lonely Too Long" – The Young Rascals
- "Knock on Wood" – Otis Redding and Carla Thomas
- "L'amour est bleu – Vicky Leandros
- "La balsa" – Los Gatos (Founding song of the Argentine rock movement)
- "Let Love Come Between Us" – James & Bobby Purify
- "Let's Go To San Francisco" – The Flower Pot Men
- "The Look of Love" – Dusty Springfield (m. Burt Bacharach w. Hal David)
- "Magic Colors" – Lesley Gore
- "Matthew and Son" – Cat Stevens
- "Monterey" – Eric Burdon & the Animals
- "More and More" – Andy Williams
- "More Love" – Smokey Robinson and the Miracles
- "Music to Watch Girls By" – Andy Williams
- "My Back Pages" – The Byrds
- "My White Bicycle" – Tomorrow
- "New York Mining Disaster 1941" – Bee Gees
- "Maids When You're Young Never Wed An Old Man" – The Dubliners
- "Night of Fear" – The Move
- "Night Of The Long Grass"- The Troggs
- "Nights In White Satin – The Moody Blues
- "No Milk Today" – Herman's Hermits (w.m. Graham Gouldman)
- "On a Carousel" – The Hollies
- "People Are Strange" – The Doors
- "Pictures of Lily" – The Who
- "Pretty Ballerina" – Left Banke
- "Puppet on a String" – Al Hirt
- "Randy Scouse Git" ("Alternate Title" in the UK) – The Monkees
- "Shake a Tail Feather" – James & Bobby Purify
- "She's a Rainbow" – The Rolling Stones
- "So You Want to Be a Rock 'n' Roll Star" – The Byrds
- "Society's Child (Baby I've Been Thinking)" – Janis Ian (w.m. Janis Ian)
- "Sorry" - Doris Day
- "Soul Finger" – The Bar-Kays
- "Summer Colors" – Wayne Newton
- "Susan" – The Buckinghams
- "Thank the Lord for the Night Time" – Neil Diamond
- "There Is a Mountain" – Donovan
- "Time Alone Will Tell" - Connie Francis
- "To Love Somebody" – Bee Gees
- "Tramp" – Otis Redding and Carla Thomas
- "Try a Little Tenderness" – Otis Redding
- "Twelve Thirty" – The Mamas & the Papas
- "Waterloo Sunset" – The Kinks
- "We Love You"/"Dandelion" – The Rolling Stones
- "Wear Your Love Like Heaven" – Donovan
- "When I Was Young" – Eric Burdon & the Animals
- "Zabadak!" – Dave Dee, Dozy, Beaky, Mick & Tich

== Published popular music ==
w. = words, m. = music

- "At the Crossroads" w.m. Leslie Bricusse, from the film Doctor Dolittle
- "The Bare Necessities" w.m. Terry Gilkyson from the film The Jungle Book
- "Blowin' Away" w.m. Laura Nyro
- "Bonnie and Clyde" w.m. Charles Strouse
- "Both Sides, Now" w.m. Joni Mitchell
- "By the Time I Get to Phoenix" w.m. Jimmy Webb
- "Colour My World" w.m. Jackie Trent & Tony Hatch
- "Do You Know The Way To San Jose?" w. Hal David m. Burt Bacharach
- "Even The Bad Times Are Good" w. Peter Callander m. Mitch Murray
- "The Eyes Of Love" w. Bob Russell m. Quincy Jones
- "Fortuosity" w.m. Richard M. Sherman and Robert B. Sherman, introduced by Tommy Steele in the film The Happiest Millionaire
- "Gentle On My Mind" w.m. John Hartford
- "Happiness" w.m. Clark Gesner from the musical You're a Good Man, Charlie Brown
- "Hare Krishna" w. Gerome Ragni & James Rado m. Galt MacDermot
- "I Wanna Be Like You" w.m. Richard M. Sherman and Robert B. Sherman, from the film The Jungle Book
- "I've Gotta Be Me" w.m. Walter Marks
- "In the Heat of the Night" w. Alan Bergman & Marilyn Bergman m. Quincy Jones. Theme song from the film of the same name, performed by Ray Charles
- "The Look of Love" w. Hal David m. Burt Bacharach from the film Casino Royale, sung by Dusty Springfield
- "Mrs. Robinson" w.m. Paul Simon from the film The Graduate
- "My Friend, The Doctor" w.m. Leslie Bricusse from the film Doctor Dolittle
- "One Less Bell To Answer" w. Hal David m. Burt Bacharach
- "Springtime for Hitler" w.m. Mel Brooks, from the film The Producers
- "Puppet on a String" w.m. Bill Martin & Phil Coulter
- "Talk to the Animals" w.m. Leslie Bricusse. Introduced by Rex Harrison in the film Doctor Dolittle
- "The Tapioca" w. Sammy Cahn m. Jimmy Van Heusen Introduced by Jim Bryant dubbing for James Fox in the film Thoroughly Modern Millie
- "Thoroughly Modern Millie" w. Sammy Cahn m. Jimmy Van Heusen Introduced by Julie Andrews in the film Thoroughly Modern Millie
- "To Sir, with Love" w.m. Don Black & Mark London. Introduced by Lulu in the 1967 film To Sir, with Love
- "What a Wonderful World" w.m. Bob Thiele & George David Weiss
- "You Only Live Twice" w. Leslie Bricusse m. John Barry

== Other notable songs ==
- "Alegria, Alegria" w.m. Caetano Veloso
- "Comme d'habitude" w. Claude François and Gilles Thibaut m. Claude François and Jacques Revaux
- "Déshabillez-moi" w. Robert Nyel m. Gaby Verlor
- "Nezhnost'" w. Nikolay Dobronravov and Sergey Grebennikov m. Alexandra Pakhmutova

== Classical music ==
- Jean Absil – Concerto for Piano and Orchestra No. 2
- Malcolm Arnold – Symphony No. 6
- Luciano Berio
  - Chemins II for viola and nine instruments
  - O King for soprano and five instruments
  - Sequenza VI for viola
- Earle Brown – Event: Synergy II, for chamber ensemble
- Carlos Chávez – Soli IV, for horn, trumpet, and trombone
- George Crumb – Echoes of Time and the River (Echoes II) for orchestra
- Gottfried von Einem – Violin Concerto
- Benjamin Frankel – Viola Concerto
- Philip Glass – 600 Lines
- Milko Kelemen – Composé, for two pianos and orchestral group
- Wojciech Kilar – Solenne per 67 Esecutori, for solo voices and orchestra or instrumental ensemble
- Paul Lansky – String Quartet No. 1
- György Ligeti – Lontano
- Witold Lutosławski – Symphony No. 2
- Bruno Maderna – Concerto No. 2 for Oboe and Orchestra
- Henri Pousseur – Couleurs croisées for large orchestra
- María Teresa Prieto – Palo verde, ballet
- Steve Reich – Piano Phase
- Karlheinz Stockhausen –
  - Hymnen
  - Mixtur, version for small orchestra
  - Prozession
- Toru Takemitsu – November Steps
- Veljo Tormis
  - Eesti kalendrilaulud (Estonian Calendar Songs)
  - Maarjamaa ballaad (Ballad of Mary's Land)
- Iannis Xenakis
  - Medea for male voices and 5 instruments
  - Polytope de Montréal
- Bernd Alois Zimmermann
  - Intercomunicazione
  - Tratto

== Opera ==
- Yasushi Akutagawa – Orpheus of Hiroshima
- Richard Rodney Bennett – A Penny for a Song
- Cromwell Everson – Klutaimnestra (Eng: Clytemnestra)
- Elizabeth Maconchy – The Three Strangers
- William Walton – The Bear

== Musical theater ==
- The Boy Friend (Sandy Wilson) – London revival opened at the Comedy Theatre on November 29 and ran for 365 performances
- By Jupiter (Music: Richard Rodgers Lyrics: Lorenz Hart Book: Rodgers and Hart). Off-Broadway revival opened at Theatre Four on January 19 and ran for 118 performances.
- Curley McDimple (Music & Lyrics: Robert Dahdah Book: Mary Boylan and Robert Dahdah). Off-Broadway production opened at the Bert Wheeler Theatre on November 22 and ran for 931 performances
- Fiddler on the Roof (Music: Jerry Bock Lyrics: Sheldon Harnick Book: Joseph Stein). London production opened at Her Majesty's Theatre on February 16 and ran for 2030 performances.
- The Four Musketeers, (Music: Laurie Johnson Lyrics: Herbert Kretzmer Book: Michael Pertwee). London production opened at the Drury Lane Theatre on December 5 and ran for 462 performances
- Hallelujah, Baby! – Broadway production opened at the Martin Beck Theatre and ran for 293 performances
- Henry, Sweet Henry – Broadway production opened at the Palace Theatre and ran for 80 performances
- How Now, Dow Jones – Broadway production opened at the Lunt-Fontanne Theatre and ran for 220 performances
- Oliver! (Music, Lyrics & Book: Lionel Bart) – London revival opened at the Piccadilly Theatre on April 26 and ran for 331 performances
- Sweet Charity (Music: Cy Coleman Lyrics: Dorothy Fields Book: Neil Simon). London production opened at the Prince of Wales Theatre on October 11 and ran for 476 performances.

== Musical films ==
- Anna
- Camelot
- Doctor Dolittle, starring Rex Harrison, Samantha Eggar and Anthony Newley. Directed by Richard Fleischer
- The Fastest Guitar Alive, starring Roy Orbison
- Half a Sixpence, starring Tommy Steele
- The Happiest Millionaire
- How to Succeed in Business Without Really Trying
- Les Demoiselles de Rochefort
- The Mikado
- Thoroughly Modern Millie, starring Julie Andrews and Mary Tyler Moore.
- Magical Mystery Tour, starring The Beatles

== Births ==
- January 2 – Tia Carrere (Althea Rae Janairo), American actress and singer
- January 4 – Son of Dave (Benjamin Darvill), Canadian-born musician (Crash Test Dummies)
- January 5 - J. H. Wyman, a film and TV producer, screenwriter, director and musician
- January 6 – A. R. Rahman (A. S. Dileep Kumar), Indian film composer
- January 8 — R. Kelly (Robert Sylvester Kelly), American singer-songwriter, record producer
- January 7 – Mark Lamarr (Mark Jones), English presenter of radio and TV music programmes
- January 9
  - Dave Matthews, American singer, songwriter, and guitarist
  - Steve Harwell, American musician and singer (Smash Mouth) (d. 2023)
- January 11 – The Real Roxanne, American female hip-hop
- January 14
  - Steve Bowman, American rock drummer (Counting Crows)
  - Nicki Chapman, English television and radio presenter
- January 15 – Lisa Lisa, American singer (Lisa Lisa and Cult Jam)
- January 22 – Eleanor McEvoy, Irish singer-songwriter and guitarist
- January 25 – Voltaire (Aurelio Voltaire Hernández), Cuban-born cabaret musician
- January 28 – Marvin Sapp, American singer-songwriter
- January 31
  - Fat Mike (Michael Burkett), American rock singer and musician
  - Chad Channing, American rock drummer (Nirvana and Child's Play )
  - Jason Cooper, English drummer (The Cure and My Life Story)
- February 1 – C. J. Lewis, English singer
- February 6
  - Anita Cochran, American singer-songwriter, guitarist and producer
  - Izumi Sakai, Japanese pop singer (Zard) (d. 2007)
- February 11
  - Clay Crosse, American Christian musician
  - Paul McLoone, Irish DJ, producer, voice actor and frontman/lead vocalist with The Undertones
- February 12 – Chitravina N. Ravikiran, Indian composer and musician
- February 13 – DJ Jurgen, Dutch DJ, remixer and producer (Alice Deejay)
- February 17 – Chanté Moore, American singer
- February 18 – Roberto Baggio, Italian former footballer
- February 19 – Sven Erik Kristiansen Norwegian Black metal and hardcore punk singer (Maniac)
- February 20 – Kurt Cobain, American singer-songwriter (Nirvana) (d. 1994)
- February 21 – Michael Ward, American guitarist (The Wallflowers) (d. 2024)
- March 4 – Evan Dando American musician and frontman/lead vocalist (The Lemonheads)
- March 7 – Ruthie Henshall, English actress, singer, and dancer; star of stage musicals
- March 11 – John Barrowman, British-American actor and singer
- March 16 – Bettina Soriat, Austrian singer
- March 17 – Billy Corgan American musician, songwriter, producer, poet (The Smashing Pumpkins)
- March 18 – Miki Berenyi, British rock lead singer
- March 21
  - Jonas Berggren (Ace of Base)
  - Maxim, English musician and singer (The Prodigy)
- March 29 – John Popper (Blues Traveler)
- April 7 – Alex Christensen, German dance music producer, songwriter and DJ
- April 12 – Sarah Cracknell (Saint Etienne)
- April 14 – Barrett Martin, American drummer and composer
- April 15 – Frankie Poullain, British rock bassist (The Darkness)
- April 17 – Liz Phair, American singer-songwriter
- April 18 – Todd Terry, American DJ and record producer
- April 20 – Mike Portnoy, American rock drummer (Dream Theater)
- April 27 – Sung Dong-il, South Korean actor
- April 28 – Kari Wuhrer, American actress and singer
- April 30 – Filipp Kirkorov, Soviet and Russian pop singer, actor, producer, TV presenter
- April 30 — Turbo B, American rapper and beatboxer (Snap!, Centory)
- May 1 – Tim McGraw, American country singer, producer, and actor
- May 6 – Mark Bryan American musician (Hootie & the Blowfish)
- May 11 – Apache Indian (real name Steven Kapur), British reggae singer and DJ
- May 13
  - Chuck Schuldiner, American singer and guitarist (d. 2001)
  - Melanie Thornton, American pop singer (d. 2001)
- May 18 – Rob Base, American rapper
- May 19 – Alexia, Italian singer
- May 22 – MC Eiht, American rapper
- May 23 – Phil Selway (Radiohead)
- May 24 – Heavy D, Jamaican-born American rapper record producer, singer, and actor (d. 2011)
- May 28 - Tania Evans, German singer (Culture Beat)
- May 29 – Noel Gallagher, English singer, songwriter and musician (Oasis)
- June 1 - Roger Sanchez, American DJ and remixer
- June 3 – Newton, English singer and firefighter
- June 7 – Dave Navarro, American guitarist, singer, songwriter, and actor (guitarist (Jane's Addiction and Red Hot Chili Peppers))
- June 8 – Jasmin Tabatabai, Iranian-German actress and musician
- June 9 – Dean Felber, Hootie & the Blowfish
- June 10 – Emma Anderson, English musician, singer-songwriter, guitarist, member of (Lush)
- June 17
  - Dorothea Röschmann, German soprano and actress
  - Eric Stefani, American keyboard player, songwriter and animator (No Doubt)
- June 18 – Glen Benton, American rock singer/bassist (Deicide)
- June 20
  - Jerome Fontamillas, American singer and guitarist
  - Nicole Kidman, Australian singer, musician, actress, and producer
- June 24
  - Jeff Cease, American guitarist (The Black Crowes)
  - Richard Kruspe German musician and guitarist (Rammstein)
- June 29
  - Murray Foster, Canadian rock bassist (Moxy Früvous)
  - Melora Hardin, American actress and singer
  - John Feldmann, American musician and music producer
- July 7 – Jackie Neal, American blues singer (d. 2005)
- July 9 – Tó Cruz, Portuguese singer
- July 12 – John Petrucci, American virtuoso guitarist
- July 13 – Benny Benassi, Italian DJ, record producer, and remixer
- July 16 – Jules De Martino, English drummer and singer (The Ting Tings)
- July 17 – Susan Ashton, American singer
- July 19 – Stuart Howe, Canadian operatic tenor
- July 22 – Pat Badger American musician, singer, and songwriter (Extreme)
- July 25 – Günther, Swedish singer
- July 27 – Juliana Hatfield, American singer-songwriter and musician
- July 28 – Taka Hirose, Japanese musician (Feeder)
- August 3 – Skin, British singer, songwriter (Skunk Anansie) and electronic music DJ
- August 5 – Vladyslav Gorai, Ukrainian operatic tenor (d. 2025)
- August 9 – Positive K, American rapper
- August 18 – Blas Elias, American drummer (Slaughter)
- August 19 – Tabitha Soren, American photographer and reporter
- August 21 – Serj Tankian Armenian-American singer, musician, songwriter, record producer, and political activist (System of a Down)
- August 22
  - Yukiko Okada, Japanese pop singer (d. 1986)
  - Layne Staley, American rock singer (Alice in Chains) (d. 2002)
  - Christopher Williams, American R&B singer and actor
- August 23 – Cedella Marley, Jamaican reggae singer
- August 25 – Jeff Tweedy American musician, songwriter, author, and record producer (Wilco)
- August 27 – Ogie Alcasid, Filipino singer, television personality, and husband of Regine Velasquez
- August 29 – Anton Newcombe, American rock musician (The Brian Jonestown Massacre)
- September 2 – Dino Cazares, American rock guitarist (Divine Heresy, Fear Factory)
- September 5 – Jesper Koch, Danish composer
- September 6 – Macy Gray, American R&B singer and actress
- September 9 – Chris Caffery, American guitarist and singer
- September 11 – Harry Connick, Jr., American jazz singer and pianist
- September 14 – John Power, Irish-English singer, songwriter, and guitarist (The La's)
- September 18 – Ricky Bell, American singer and actor (New Edition, Bell Biv DeVoe)
- September 20
  - Gunnar Nelson, American singer
  - Matthew Nelson, American singer
- September 21 – Faith Hill, American country singer and record producer
- September 21 – Tyler Stewart (Barenaked Ladies)
- September 26 – Shannon Hoon, American singer (Blind Melon) (d. 1995)
- September 28 – Moon Unit Zappa, American actress and musician
- September 29 – Brett Anderson, Suede
- October 2 – Bud Gaugh American drummer (Sublime)
- October 4 – Ekin Cheng, Hong Kong actor and singer
- October 5 – Johnny Gioeli, American power metal singer
- October 7 – Toni Braxton, American singer, songwriter, pianist, record producer, actress, television personality, and philanthropist
- October 7 – Luke Haines, English musician, singer, songwriter and author (The Auteurs)
- October 8 – Teddy Riley, American R&B and hip hop singer
- October 9 – Mat Osman, English musician and author (Suede)
- October 10 – Mike Malinin American musician (Goo Goo Dolls)
- October 17
  - Roberto Cani, Italian violinist (d. 2025)
  - René Dif, Danish musician, singer-songwriter, DJ and actor (Aqua)
- October 19 – Trouble T Roy, back-up singer for Heavy D & the Boyz (d. 1990)
- October 22
  - Salvatore Di Vittorio, Italian composer and conductor
  - Rita Guerra, Portuguese singer-songwriter
- October 26 – Keith Urban, New Zealand-Australian country music singer, songwriter, guitarist, musician, TV show judge, and record producer
- October 27 – Scott Weiland American singer and songwriter (Stone Temple Pilots) (d. 2015)
- October 29 – Péter Kun, Hungarian guitarist (d. 1993)
- October 31
  - Adam Schlesinger American musician, singer, songwriter, composer, and record producer (Fountains of Wayne) (d. 2020)
  - Vanilla Ice, American rapper, singer, actor, and television host
- November 1
  - Tina Arena, Australian-French singer-songwriter
- November 3 – Steven Wilson, English progressive rock musician
- November 5 – Kayah (Katarzyna Magdalena Szczot), Polish pop singer-songwriter
- November 7
  - Steve Di Giorgio, American bassist
  - Sharleen Spiteri, Scottish recording artist and songwriter (Texas)
  - David Guetta, French DJ and music producer
- November 10 – Vivian Chow, Hong Kong singer-songwriter and actress
- November 14
  - Letitia Dean, English actress and singer
  - Nina Gordon, American singer
- November 15 – E-40, American rapper
- November 17 – Ronnie DeVoe American singer, rapper and actor (New Edition, Bell Biv DeVoe)
- November 19 – Lauren Christy, English singer-songwriter and record producer (member of The Matrix writing team)
- November 20 – Teoman, Turkish rock singer-songwriter
- November 27 – Rodney Sheppard, American guitarist (Sugar Ray)
- December 5 – Gary Allan, American country musician
- December 6 – Hacken Lee, Hong Kong singer and actor
- December 8
  - Tom Holkenborg, Dutch composer, multi-instrumentalist, DJ, music producer, and engineer.
  - Janice Robinson, American singer-songwriter eurodance group (Livin' Joy)
- December 9 – Joshua Bell, American violinist
- December 12
  - Yuzo Koshiro, Japanese composer and producer
  - Takenobu Mitsuyoshi, Japanese composer and voice actor
  - Deke Sharon, American singer-songwriter and producer (The House Jacks and Beelzebubs)
- December 13 – Jamie Foxx, American singer-songwriter, actor, producer, and comedian
- December 17 – Gigi D'Agostino, DJ
- December 25
  - Jason Thirsk, Pennywise
  - Boris Novković, Croatian singer-songwriter
- February 1 – Gábor Tarján, composer

== Deaths ==
- January 1 – Moon Mullican, country singer, 57 (heart attack)
- January 3 – Mary Garden, operatic soprano, 93
- January 7 – Carl Schuricht, conductor, 86
- January 11 – Wolfgang Zeller, German composer, 73
- January 15 – Albert Szirmai, composer, 86
- January 27 – Luigi Tenco, singer-songwriter and actor, 28 (suicide by gunshot)
- January 31 – Geoffrey O'Hara, composer, 84
- February 3 – Joe Meek, English record producer and sound engineer, 37 (suicide)
- February 5 – Violeta Parra, Chilean folk musician, 49 (suicide by gunshot)
- February 12 – Muggsy Spanier, jazz cornettist, 60
- February 15 – Li Jinhui, composer and songwriter, 75
- February 16 – Smiley Burnette, singer and songwriter, 55 (leukaemia)
- February 24 – Franz Waxman, composer, 60
- February 25 – Fats Pichon, jazz pianist, bandleader, 60
- March 6
  - Zoltán Kodály, composer, 84
  - Nelson Eddy, US singer and actor, 65
- March 7 – Willie Smith, alto saxophonist, 56 (cancer)
- March 10 – Ina Boyle, Irish composer, 78
- March 11 – Geraldine Farrar, operatic soprano, 85
- March 22 – Luigi Piazza, operatic baritone, 82
- March 23 – Pete Johnson, jazz pianist, 62
- March 29 – Cheo Marquetti, singer-songwriter, 57
- April 5 – Mischa Elman, violinist, 76
- April 12 – Buster Bailey, jazz musician, 64
- April 15 – Totò, songwriter, 69
- April 16 – Knud Harder, composer, 82
- April 17 – Red Allen, jazz trumpeter, 59
- April 20 – Anna Fitziu, operatic soprano, 80
- April 29 – J. B. Lenoir, blues musician, 38 (heart attack)
- April 30 – Jef Le Penven, composer, 47
- May 9 – Philippa Schuyler, pianist and child prodigy
- May 10 – Arthur Carron, operatic tenor, 66
- May 17 – John Wesley Work III, composer, 65
- May 21 – Ilona Eibenschütz, pianist, 95
  - Barsegh Kanachyan, composer of the Armenian national anthem, 82
- May 31 – Billy Strayhorn, composer and pianist, 51 (esophageal cancer)
- June 3 – André Cluytens, conductor, 62
- June 18 – Harold Levey, composer, conductor, arranger, orchestrator, and clarinetist, 73
- June 24
  - Lionel Belasco, pianist and bandleader, about 85
  - Kai Normann Andersen, composer, 67
- June 26 – Françoise Dorléac, actress and singer, 25 (car accident)
- June 29 – Jayne Mansfield, actress, violinist and sometime singer, 34 (car accident)
- July 17 – John Coltrane, jazz musician, 40 (liver cancer)
- July 26 – Matthijs Vermeulen, composer, 79
- July 30 – Marios Varvoglis, composer, 81
- August 4
  - Gustave Samazeuilh, composer, editor and critic, 90
  - Nino Marcelli, conductor and composer, 77
- August 5 – Evelyn Scotney, coloratura soprano, 71
- August 8 – Jaromír Weinberger, composer, 71
- August 27 – Brian Epstein, manager of the Beatles, 32
- September 15 – Hans Haug, primitivist composer, 67
- September 17 – Stanley R. Avery, composer, 87
- September 25 – Stuff Smith, jazz violinist, 58
- October 3
  - Woody Guthrie singer, songwriter, 55 (Huntington's Disease)
  - Sir Malcolm Sargent, conductor, 72
- November 8 – Keg Johnson, jazz trombonist, 58
- November 10 – Ida Cox, blues singer, 71
- November 13 – Harriet Cohen, pianist, 71
- November 16 – Roshan, Bollywood composer, 50 (heart attack)
- November 22 – Edvin Kallstenius, composer, 86
- November 23 – Otto Erich Deutsch, musicologist, 84
- November 24 – Raúl Borges, guitarist and composer, 85
- November 25 – Dawid Engela, broadcaster, composer and musicologist, 36 (road accident)
- November 30 – Heinz Tietjen, conductor, 86
- December 4 – Bert Lahr, vaudeville performer, 72
- December 6 – Lillian Evanti, operatic soprano, 77
- December 10 (in plane crash):
  - Otis Redding, soul singer, 26
  - Four of six members of soul group The Bar-Kays:
  - Ronnie Caldwell, 18
  - Phalon Jones, 18
  - Jimmy King, 18
  - Carl Cunningham, 18
- December 11 – Victor de Sabata, conductor and composer, 75
- December 19 – Carmen Melis, operatic soprano, 82
- December 28 – Maria Nemeth, operatic soprano, 70
- December 29 – Paul Whiteman, bandleader, 77
- December 30 – Roger Penzabene, Motown songwriter, 23 (suicide)
- date unknown
  - Texas Gladden, folk singer

== Awards ==
=== Grammy Awards ===
- Grammy Awards of 1967

=== Eurovision Song Contest ===
- Eurovision Song Contest 1967

=== Other ===
- Sangeet Natak Akademi Award for Hindustani music – Amir Khan

== See also ==
- Hot 100 No. 1 Hits of 1967
