= Basic Blues Magoos =

Studio album by Blues Magoos
- Released: May 13, 1968
- Recorded: 1967–1968
- Genre: Psychedelic rock; blues rock; garage rock; pop rock
- Length: 36:09
- Label: Mercury
- Producer: The Blues Magoos, Bob Wyld, Art Polhemus

Blues Magoos chronology
Electric Comic Book (1967)	Basic Blues Magoos (1968)	Never Goin' Back to Georgia (1969)

Singles from Basic Blues Magoos
- 1. "I Wanna Be There" Released: August 7, 1967; 2. "There She Goes" Released: September 1967; 3. "I Can Hear the Grass Grow" Released: August 1968

Professional ratings
Review scores
Source	Rating
AllMusic	4/5 stars

Basic Blues Magoos is the third album by the American rock band the Blues Magoos. It was released on Mercury Records on May 13, 1968 (see 1968 in music). The album saw the group transitioning from psychedelia back to their blues rock roots. Though the album has gained more favor over the years, it was received as a disappointment upon its original distribution and failed to chart.

== Background ==
The Blues Magoos' second album, Electric Comic Book, was released five months after "(We Ain't Got) Nothin' Yet" from their debut album, Psychedelic Lollipop, reached number five on the Billboard Hot 100. While the album exemplified the group's psychedelic sound, the release also saw their record producers, Bob Wyld and Art Polhemus, conceive extravagant marketing ploys to promote the band as a mainstream act. Such attempts spawned the commercially unsuccessful Christmas single, "Jingle Bells", a comic book accompanying Electric Comic Book that was meant to entice younger buyers, and outfitted the Blues Magoos in flashy "electric suits", in their live performances.

The band emerged as proven songwriters by the time they commenced recording, so the group decided self-producing all but four tracks on Basic Blues Magoos was the most ideal move to achieve independence from Wyld and Polhemus. The album represented a notable shift in the Blues Magoos musical direction, as they began returning to their blues rock roots with a blend of pop rock, a transition they would complete on their next effort. The band also swapped their over-the-top image for a traditional rock persona. Additionally, the group's recent tour as a supporting act for The Who exposed them to British mod and freakbeat acts, which manifested itself with the cover version of The Move's song, "I Can Hear the Grass Grow", and the original tune, "Sybil Green (Of the in Between)".

Basic Blues Magoos was the first Blues Magoos album that failed to chart. Afterwards, the band experienced lineup changes, and left Mercury Records to sign with ABC Records. They would fulfill their progression toward blues rock on their subsequent album, Never Goin' Back to Georgia, in 1969.

== Track listing ==
=== Side one ===
1. "Sybil Green (Of the in Between)" (Ralph Scala, Ronnie Gilbert) – 2:40
2. "I Can Hear the Grass Grow" (Roy Wood) – 2:18
3. "All the Better to See You With" (Scala, Gilbert) – 2:19
4. "Yellow Rose" (Emil Thielhelm, Gilbert) – 2:30
5. "I Wanna Be There" (Thielhelm, Scala) – 2:56
6. "I Can Move a Mountain" (Thielhelm) – 3:49

=== Side two ===
1. "President's Council on Psychedelic Fitness" (Scala, Gilbert) – 2:45
2. "Scarecrow's Love Affair" (Thielhelm, Gilbert) – 4:01
3. "There She Goes" (Thielhelm, Mike Esposito, Scala, Gilbert) – 2:51
4. "Accidental Meditation" (Esposito) – 1:40
5. "You're Getting Old" (Thielhelm, Gilbert) – 4:15
6. "Subliminal Sonic Laxative" (Thielhelm, Esposito, Scala, Gilbert, Geoffrey Daking) – 1:00
7. "Chicken Wire Lady" (Thielhelm, Gilbert) – 4:05

== Personnel ==
=== Blues Magoos ===
- Ralph Scala – lead vocals, keyboards
- Ronnie Gilbert – bass guitar
- Emil "Peppy" Thielheim – rhythm guitar
- Mike Esposito – lead guitar
- Geoffrey Daking – drums

=== Technical ===
- Blues Magoos – producer
- Art Polhemus – producer (tracks 2, 5, 6, 9)
- Bob Wyld – producer (tracks 2, 5-6, 9
