= Ray Bloodworth =

Australian rules footballer

Personal information
- Full name: Ray Bloodworth
- Born: 8 December 1933
- Original team: Burnley
- Height: 178 cm (5 ft 10 in)
- Weight: 73 kg (161 lb)

Playing career^{1}
Years	Club	Games (Goals)
1955–56	Richmond	2 (0)
- ^{1} Playing statistics correct to the end of 1956.

Ray Bloodworth (born 8 December 1933) is a former Australian rules footballer who played with Richmond in the Victorian Football League (VFL).
