= Soli IV =

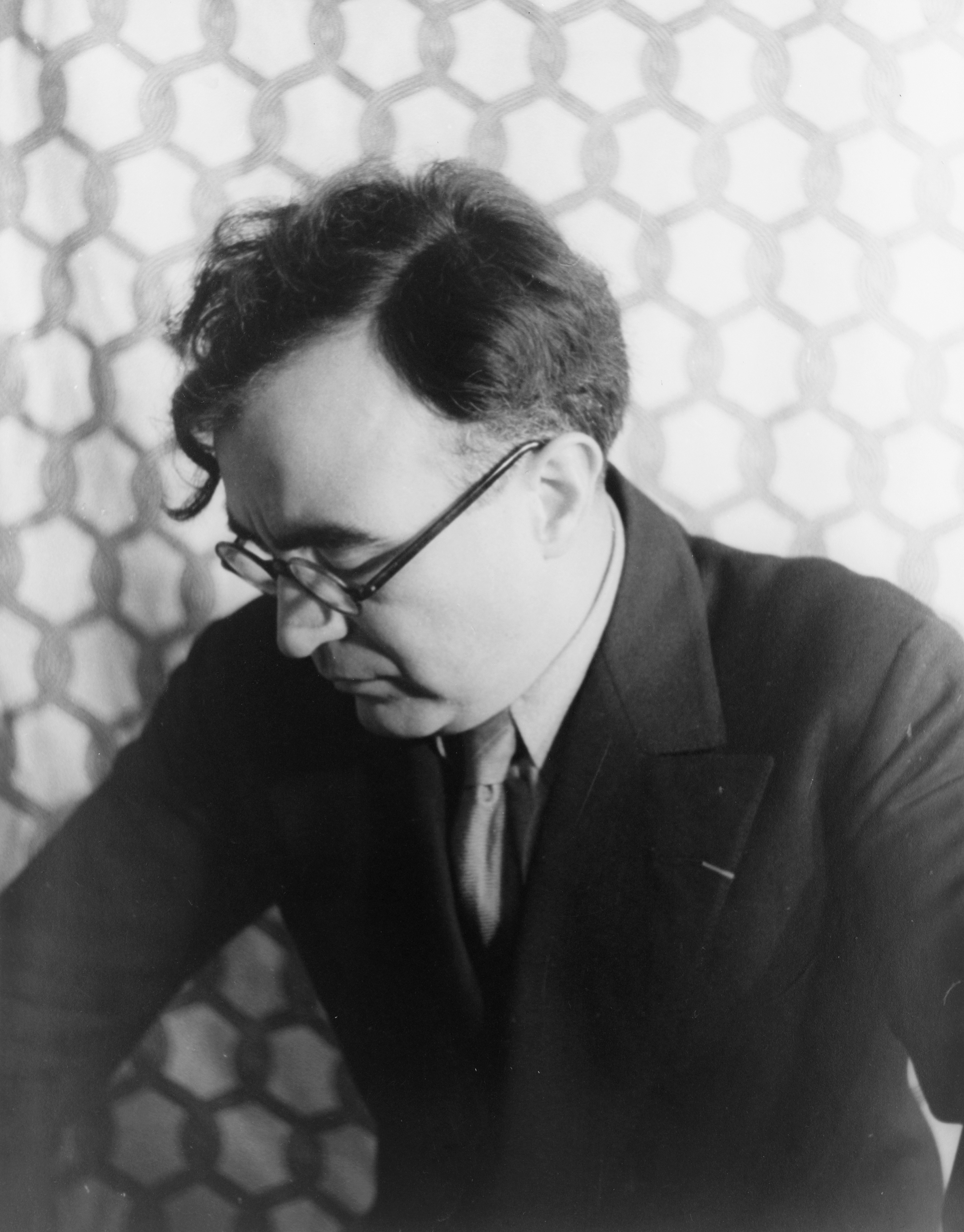
Carlos Chávez in 1937

Soli IV is a brass trio written in 1967, the last of a series of four works by Mexican composer Carlos Chávez, each featuring a succession of solos.

In contrast to the more traditional character of most of Chávez's large-ensemble work, the Solis belong to the more "experimental", high-modernist strand of his compositional output, which features an abstract, atonal musical language based on the principle of non-repetition. In the composer's own words, the objective is one of "constant rebirth, of true derivation: a stream that never comes back to its source; a stream of eternal development, like a spiral, always linked to, and continuing, its original source, but always searching for new and unlimited spaces".

== History ==
Soli IV was commissioned by Mario di Bonaventura for the Hopkins Center Congregation for the Arts at Dartmouth College, in Hanover, New Hampshire. It was premiered in the Spaulding Auditorium of the Hopkins Center on 9 August 1967 by Robert Pierce, horn, Dominick de Gangi, trumpet, and Dean Werner, trombone.

== Analysis ==
Soli IV "has about it a rather special kind of 'atonality' (since the more 'tonal' intervals, such as fifths, fourths, major-thirds, minor-sevenths, and octaves, are seldom, or never used). Otherwise, melody and melodic counterpoint, proceed freely, each 'antecedent' producing a 'consequent' that in turn becomes the antecedent for a new consequent. It is music that continually evolves from itself. In this sense, the entire piece constitutes a single, long, main 'theme'".

In Soli IV, the foreground is taken first by the horn, then the trumpet, and finally the trombone The instrumental solos, however, are often submerged in the ensemble interaction. Sections are created by tempo changes and subtle alterations of texture and style, and each section is introduced by either the trumpet or the trombone. Within a prevailing chromatic field, Chávez concentrates locally on smaller note groupings, primarily of four- or five-note chromatic sets. A slightly larger set of seven notes, E, E♭, D, C♯, G, G♯ F♯ in the trombone opens the work lyrically and at a moderate pace. Six more sections follow (beginning at b. 30, 43, 85, 92, 103, and 112). The evolving contrapuntal interplay is punctuated by vertical harmonies, almost always of the (0,1,2) chromatic trichord, sometimes preceded by an (0,1,3) trichord to form a cadence. The final cadence is also to a (0,1,2) trichord: trumpet and trombone on F_{5} and E♭_{5} over E_{4} in the horn.

== Discography ==
- Chávez Conducted by Carlos Chávez: Soli I, Soli II, Soli IV. Ruben Islas, flute; Sally Van Den Berg, oboe; Anastasio Flores, clarinet; Louis Salomons, bassoon; Felipe Leon, trumpet; Vicente Zarzo, horn; Clemente Sanabria, trombone; Carlos Chávez, cond. LP recording, 1 disc: 12 in., 33⅓rpm, stereo. Odyssey Y 31534. New York: Columbia Records, 1972.
- Carlos Chávez: Complete Chamber Music Vol. 2. Energía, Soli I, Soli II, Soli IV, Sonata for Four Horns. Southwest Chamber Music. CD recording, 1 disc: digital, 12 cm, stereo. Cambria CD8851. Lomita, CA: Cambria Master Recordings, 2004.
