= Stuart Howe =

Canadian operatic tenor (born 1967)

Stuart Howe

Stuart Howe (born July 19, 1967) is a Canadian operatic tenor who has become particularly noted for his interpretation of the heroic roles of Rossini and Donizetti.

== Early life ==
Born in Saint John, New Brunswick, Canada and raised in the countryside along the Saint John River, Stuart attended rural elementary and junior high schools before graduating from St. Malachy's Memorial High School in 1985.

At the age of fourteen, Howe began an entertainment company in the Canadian Maritimes.

Following high school he attended the University of New Brunswick in Fredericton briefly, before leaving to pursue his true ambition of the time: broadcasting. His talent was quickly recognized and he landed his first job at CFBC in Saint John. His radio career progressed and took him to Prince Edward Island, British Columbia and finally to Alberta.

== Vocal discovery ==
North of Edmonton, Alberta in the city of Fort McMurray, Howe discovered his singing talent through a series of unexpected events. Until this time, he had not sung or participated in any theatrical pursuits of any kind.

Not without substantial risk, he ended his successful radio career and began the challenge of returning to school as a mature student to begin vocal training, first attending Grant MacEwan College in Edmonton where he obtained a diploma in Music Theatre.

While enrolled, he met noted American voice teacher Richard Miller, who encouraged Stuart to devote his talent to opera alone and in the fall of 1993, Stuart moved to Oberlin, Ohio for a two-year Performance Diploma in voice – a curriculum exception created specifically for him by the school at Miller's request.

After completing this diploma at Oberlin, Stuart spent two more years studying the finer details of operatic performance with John Moriarty at the New England Conservatory of Music in Boston, Massachusetts, before moving to Germany to pursue his career.

In numerous interviews, Howe has likened his entering the opera world to that of "being dropped on to a strange planet, with a strange culture and many strange languages and being left to figure it all out alone".

== Operatic career ==
When Howe made his European debut as Nemorino in Donizetti's L'elisir d'amore in Porto, Portugal in November 1997, he had been given only three weeks prior to the opening performance to prepare. He spent sixteen-hour days learning the role while also rehearsing his movements on stage. Since then, it has become his most performed role, with a total of more than 100 performances and rising.

His efforts were such a success that the press revered him as "the quintessential Nemorino". Despite what appeared to be the beginning of a burgeoning career in Europe, he chose to return to Canada, for his first Rodolfo in Puccini's La Bohème in 1998.

Despite being based in the somewhat smaller Canadian market, Howe was still able to take on major tenor roles of all kinds including those in Lakmé, Falstaff, Don Pasquale, Lucia di Lammermoor, Anna Bolena, Maria Stuarda, La Fille du Régiment, Gianni Schicchi, The Bartered Bride, Die Fledermaus, Rossini's William Tell, Verdi's Attila, Lehár's The Merry Widow, Susannah by Carlisle Floyd, Bellini's La Straniera, Romberg's The Student Prince, Rota's The Italian Straw Hat and many others.

Sought internationally as a creator of new operatic roles, he created the role of James Nichol in Chan Ka Nin's The Iron Road to unanimous rave reviews at the historic Elgin and Winter Garden Theatres in Toronto. The opera inspired a movie of the same name produced for Canada's Canadian Broadcasting Corporation.

Prior to this debut, he also created the extensive lead role of John Higgs for Pacific Opera Victoria's critically acclaimed world premier of Erewhon from Canadian composer Louis Applebaum and librettist Mavor Moore. Both world premieres were recorded and broadcast nationwide on the Canadian Broadcasting Corporation. He also created lead roles in world premier operas such as Pulitzer Prize winning composer Robert Ward's Lady Kate, where he created the role of Tom Wade (leading to his first review in Opera News while still a student at Oberlin); and the role of Marco in The Padrone, a work written by Chadwick, former President of the New England Conservatory of Music in Boston.

After a break of nearly three years, Howe returned to full-time performing in 2011. His repertoire included works also performed by Alfredo Kraus, as well as Rossini roles written for Andrea Nozzari, including the title role in Otello and Rodrigo in La donna del lago. These roles included passages requiring high D and Db notes.

== Awards ==
Howe was also the recipient of several prestigious career development grants and awards from various organizations including The Canada Council for the Arts and the New Brunswick Arts Council. He was a 2001 Dora Award nominee for his portrayal of James Nichol in The Iron Road and was a Toronto winner of the Metropolitan Opera National Council Auditions in 1999.

== Political life ==
In August 2009, Howe entered politics for the first time as a contestant for the Liberal Party of Canada's Oakville electoral district nomination. He lost a very divided contest, but remains very active in various areas of political life.

== Teaching ==
Due to his particular educational and professional background, Howe had been approached for years to formalize and already active but informal teaching schedule. In 2010, he accepted an opportunity to participate as a voice teacher at one of Canada's young artist programs. This experience led him to formalize a full-time teaching schedule that included voice and opera skills at the University of Alberta. A renewed passion for performing ended his formal teaching duties, but he continues to be active across the globe teaching masterclasses and private lessons to young professional singers as time allows.
