= Electric Comic Book =

Studio album by Blues Magoos
- Released: April 1967
- Genre: Garage rock; psychedelic rock; acid rock
- Length: 29:58
- Label: (United States) Mercury (United Kingdom) Repertoire (2004 CD reissue)
- Producer: Bob Wyld, Art Polhemus

Blues Magoos chronology
Psychedelic Lollipop (1966)	Electric Comic Book (1967)	Basic Blues Magoos (1968)

Singles from Electric Comic Book
- 1. "Pipe Dream b/w "There's a Chance We Can Make It"" Released: February 1967

Electric Comic Book is the second album by the American rock band the Blues Magoos, the follow-up to their successful debut release Psychedelic Lollipop. The psychedelic garage rock style is followed again on this release but without a high-charting single. A couple of tracks, "Intermission" and "That's All Folks" (a very brief, hard-rocking parody of the Looney Tunes end theme) showcase the band's bizarre sense of humor.

One single was released from Electric Comic Book, "Pipe Dream" b/w "There's a Chance We Can Make It". However, "Summer is the Man" and "Life is Just a Cher O'Bowlies" were released as B-sides of two singles from their next album, Basic Blues Magoos.

Professional ratings
Review scores
Source	Rating
AllMusic	3/5 stars

== Track listing ==
1. "Pipe Dream" (Ron Gilbert, Ralph Scala) – 2:25
2. "There's a Chance We Can Make It" (Gilbert, Scala) – 2:16
3. "Life Is Just a Cher O'Bowlies" (Gilbert, Scala) – 2:37
4. "Gloria" (Van Morrison) – 6:02
5. "Intermission" (Mike Esposito) – 1:05
6. "Albert Common is Dead" (Gilbert, Scala) – 1:49
7. "Summer Is the Man" (Esposito, Gilbert) – 3:00
8. "Baby, I Want You" (Gilbert, Emil Theilhelm) – 2:43
9. "Let's Get Together" (Jimmy Reed) – 3:06
10. "Take My Love" (Gilbert, Scala) – 1:51
11. "Rush Hour" (Geoff Daking, Gilbert, Esposito) – 2:36
12. "That's All Folks" (Blues Magoos) – :09

== Personnel ==
=== Blues Magoos ===
- Ralph Scala – keyboards, vocals
- Emil "Peppy" Theilhelm – guitar, vocals
- Ron Gilbert – bass, vocals
- Mike Esposito – guitar
- Geoff Daking – drums, percussion

=== Technical ===
- Art Polhemus – producer, engineer
- Bob Wyld – producer
- Ray Fox – liner notes

== Charts ==
Album – Billboard (USA)

Year	Chart	Position
1967	Pop Albums	74

Album – RPM (Canada)

Year	Chart	Position
1967	RPM TOP 25 LPs	14

Singles – Billboard (USA)

Year	Single	Chart	Position
1967	"There's a Chance We Can Make It"	Pop Singles	81
1967	"Pipe Dream"	Pop Singles	60

Singles – RPM (Canada)

Year	Single	Chart	Position
1970	"Pipe Dream"	Canada RPM 100	40
