= Sorry (Doris Day song) =

Single by Doris Day
- B-side: "Caprice"
- Released: May 8, 1967
- Genre: Vocal
- Length: 2:20
- Label: Columbia; 44150
- Songwriter(s): Johnny Mercer, Gene de Paul
- Producer(s): Irving Townsend

Doris Day singles chronology
| "Glass Bottom Boat" (June 6, 1966) | "Sorry" (1967) |

"Sorry" is a song written by Johnny Mercer and Gene de Paul and performed by Doris Day. In 1967, the track reached No. 19 on the U.S. adult contemporary chart.
