= Stanley R. Avery =

American composer, choirmaster and organist (1879–1967)

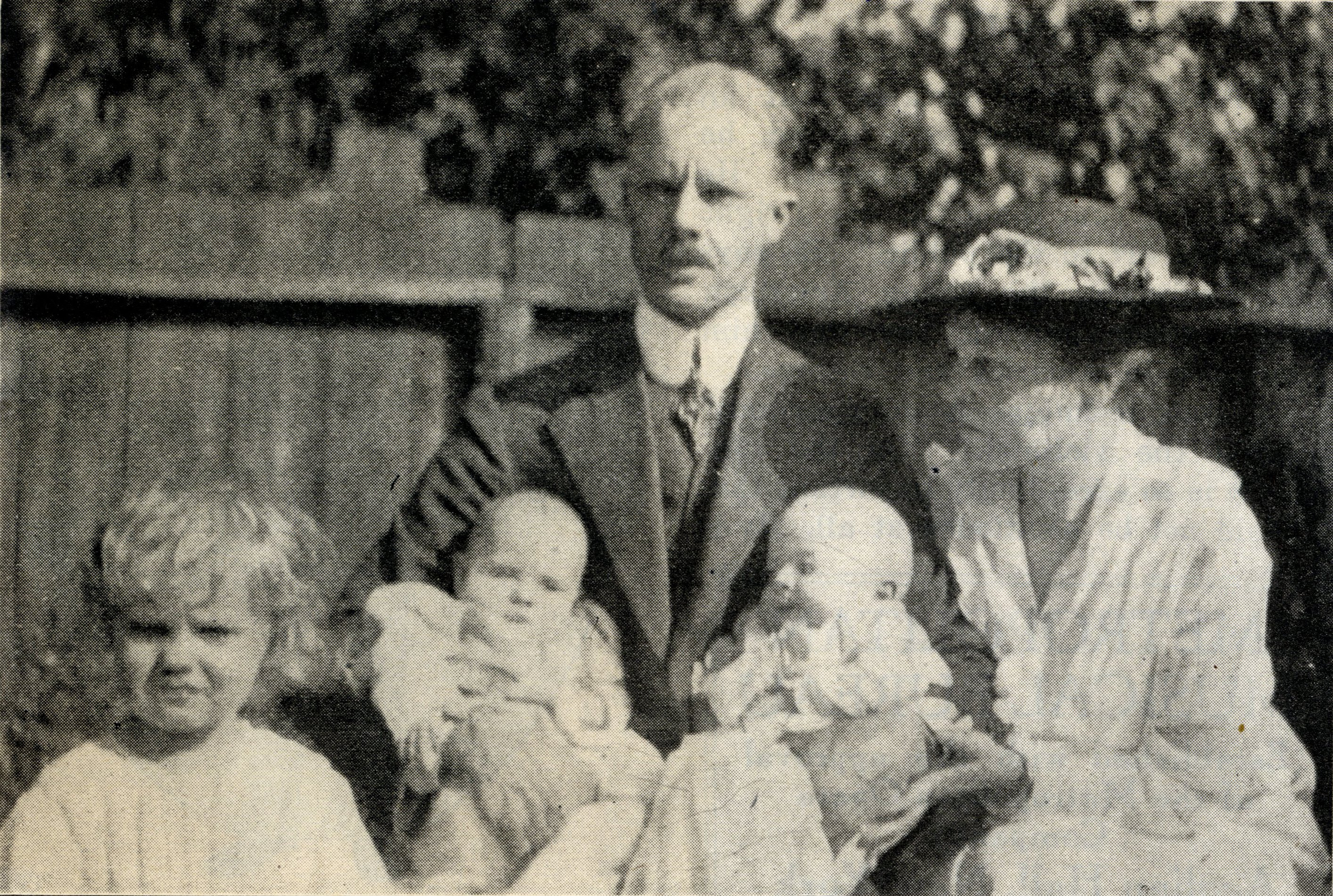
Avery in 1918 with his family

Stanley R. Avery (1879 – September 17, 1967) was an American composer, choirmaster, and organist at St. Mark's Church for 40 years. He wrote many pedagogical pieces for piano, and some of his songs and works for organ were published during his life. Among his works in larger forms is an opera, The Operatician, on a libretto by William Skinner Cooper. His compositions were performed by the Minneapolis, Duluth and Chicago symphony orchestras.

== Biography ==
Avery was born in Yonkers, New York, where he studied organ, musical composition, and choir-training. He also studied organ and musical composition in Berlin, before returning to Yonkers, where he was an organist from 1896 to 1910. He moved to Minneapolis, Minnesota, where he became a choirmaster and organist at St. Mark's Church from 1910 to 1950. He was a member of the first class to register at the American Conservatory in Fontainebleau, France, in 1921.

In Minneapolis, he was a member of the faculty of MacPhail School of Music from 1919 to 1966, and the director of music at Blake School for Boys (1934–43) and conductor of civic pageants. His compositions include a one-act opera The Quartet, a comic opera Katrina, the operettas The Merry Mexican and Ichabod Crane, incidental music to Josephine Preston Peabody's drama The Piper, two musical comedies, and overture The Taming of the Shrew, oratorio The Raising of Lazarus, and orchestral scherzo A Joyous Prelude, and other works for chamber piano and violin, and songs.

Manuscripts of Avery's musical work can be found at the University of Minnesota Music Library and at the Hennepin County Library Minneapolis Central Library Special Collections department which also has biographical information, newspaper clippings, photographs, obituary, and scrapbooks.
