= Symphony No. 2 (Lutosławski) =

Symphony by Witold Lutosławski

- by Witold Lutosławski
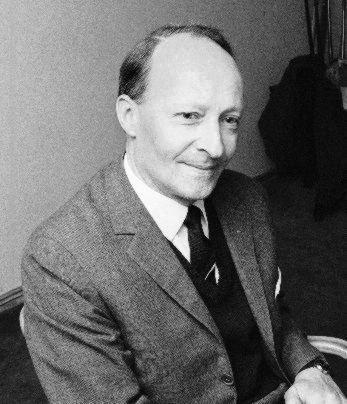
- Lutosławski during his visit to Finland, 10 March 1965
- Composed: 1965–1967
- Duration: 30 min.
- Movements: 2

Premiere
- Date: 9 June 1966
- Location: Katowice
- Conductor: Antoni Wit
- Performers: Polish Radio Symphony Orchestra

The Symphony No. 2 by the Polish composer Witold Lutosławski is an orchestral composition in two movements written between 1965 and 1967. The work exhibits Lutosławski's technique of "limited aleatoricism", where the individual instrumental parts are notated exactly, but their precise co-ordination is organised using controlled elements of chance.

== Personal and musical transitions ==
Lutosławski wrote his Symphony No. 2 between 1965 and 1967. The preceding years had been a time of transition for him and for Poland. The Soviet Union under Joseph Stalin had seized control of the country in the aftermath of World War II, and the iron-fisted cultural dictation of the Communist government severely limited both the output of Polish composers and their exposure to musical developments in the outside world between the 1949 and 1954. Many pieces, including Lutosławski's First Symphony, were condemned as formalist (focused on esoteric considerations of form rather than on speaking directly to the proletariat) and banned from public performance. In 1956, the Poles took advantage of Stalin's death to reform their government. The national ruling communist ideology became more liberal, especially regarding the arts.

Representing this shift, the first Warsaw Autumn (Poland's international music festival) took place in 1957. The purpose of this festival was to expose Polish audiences to new music which had been prohibited by the communist regime and promote the work of modern Polish composers. Lutosławski's work Muzyka żałobna ("Music of Mourning" sometimes translated "Funeral Music") was featured in the 1958 festival. In the decade that followed, Lutosławski's reputation flourished both in Poland and abroad; he traveled to many European and American music centers to serve as a music critic at music festivals, hear his works performed and receive various awards.

The Second Symphony marked a culmination of Lutosławski's music to that point. The years between the end of World War II and its completion had been a continuous effort to cement his personal style. Lutosławski had completed his first symphony in 1947—a work that some have called neoclassicist in its extensive use of canon and adherence to the four-movement standard and sonata form in the first movement. Almost two decades separate the first and second symphonies, and musically, they are a world apart. In the process of composing Five Songs on texts of Kazimiera Iłłakowicz (1956–58), Muzyka żałobna (1958), Three Postludes (1959–64), and Jeux vénitiens (1960–61), he developed the harmonic and rhythmic elements that define the Second Symphony and other mature works. The second movement of the symphony, "Direct", even used some material that had been sketched and abandoned for a fourth postlude.

These hallmarks of Lutosławski's new style include harmonic aggregate chords using all twelve tones, macrorhythmic accelerando, texture as a formal element, and a preference for grouping instruments with similar colors. When Lutosławski heard John Cage's piano concerto, he began exploring limited aleatoricism, and this became a feature of his style, although he intentionally never extended his employment of chance techniques beyond rhythm. Lutosławski stated that this rhythmic technique allows the performer a more interpretive role while preserving the control of the composer. Harmonic color preoccupied him; it was one way he tied himself to previous composers like Debussy. For Lutosławski, color was a vertical phenomenon in music, created both by the instruments used together and the intervals their parts created. Lutosławski proceeded on the momentum of the Symphony No. 2 to write the Livre pour orchestre (1968), crystallizing his personal style even further.

== Commission and early performances ==
By the early 1960s, Lutosławski had so many offers for commissions that he accepted only those that aligned with his current compositional goals. Symphony No. 2 developed out of a commission from the Norddeutscher Rundfunk in Hamburg to commemorate the 100th concert in their series of new musical works. Unfortunately, the entire symphony was not completed in time for the concert in Hamburg, so only the second movement, Direct, was performed by the Norddeutscher Rundfunk with Pierre Boulez conducting, on October 18, 1966.

The performance was met with great excitement and appreciation by all in attendance at the concert. Although the reception was positive, Lutosławski was disappointed by the partial nature of the music premiered. Less than a year later, on June 9, 1967, Symphony No. 2 (both Hesitant and Direct) was premiered by the Polish Radio Symphony Orchestra with Lutosławski conducting. The next performance took place that year at the Warsaw Autumn.

== Instrumentation ==
The orchestra, as specified in the score:

Woodwinds

3 flutes (doubling with 3 piccolos)
3 oboes (third doubling with cor anglais)
3 clarinets in B♭ (third doubling with bass clarinet)

3 bassoons

Brass

4 horns in F
3 trumpets in C
3 trombones
1 tuba

Percussion

3 timpani

5 tom-toms
glockenspiel
bass drum
tambourine
side drum
tenor drum
bells
bamboo tubes
gong
2 suspended cymbals
xylophone
vibraphone without motor

Keyboards

piano (four hands)
celesta (played by second pianist)

Strings

harp
16 violins I
14 violins II
12 violas
9 celli
6 double basses

Instrumentation plays an important role in the first movement of the work, where six episodes are performed by different ensembles. Instrumentation in "Hésitant" (all locations given by conductor's marked downbeats on the score):

Episode	Downbeats
Introduction: Brass Alone	1–3
1. Three Flutes, five tom-toms, and celesta	4–7
Refrain: two oboes and English Horn	8–9
2. Four stopped horns, side drum, parade drum, bass drum, harp	10–12
Refrain: two oboes and English horn	13–14
3. Three clarinets, vibraphone, piano	15–17
Refrain: English horn and two bassoons	18–19
4. Two cymbals, tam-tam, celesta, harp, piano	20–24
Refrain: oboe, English horn, and bassoon	25–26
5. Three flutes, three clarinets, three horns, five tom-toms, celesta, harp, piano	27–30
Refrain: oboe, English horn, and bassoon	31
6. Various small groups, which give way to the percussion. Multi-octave string clusters interrupt, leading to the final refrain.	32–46
Refrain: begins with two oboes and English horn; taken over by trumpet, trombone, and tuba; then transferred back and forth between a group of three bassoons and a group of trumpet and two trombones.	47–56

== Form ==
The second symphony is the first large-scale work for orchestra to use Lutosławski's new conception of two-movement form. After its success he began to refine this technique for use in future works. Lutosławski believed that form should be a vital but simple part of composition, "even...describable in one sentence." In his conception of two-movement form, the first movement is "preparatory, introductory in character"; its musical thoughts remain "unsaid", and the movement as a whole sounds aphoristic. The second movement then carries the bulk of the symphony's aesthetic weight; it is the "occurrence" that the first movement prepares. Lutosławski connects this feeling of proportion, especially in the presence of only one emotionally and semantically complex movement, to the symphonies of eighteenth-century Vienna and Haydn in particular. The Second Symphony only has one true point of climax—in the second movement—which goes against the symphonic principle of Beethoven and others that distribute the 'weight' of their symphonies more evenly.

Also in the style of earlier Western music, his work demonstrates closed form. Closed form compositions are intended to lead the listener down a specific path, both melodically and harmonically. A simple example of a melodic trait of closed form is the use and fragmentation of motives; a harmonic example is the use of progressions to lure the listener to expect something, such as a climax or an ending. The symphony demonstrates on a large scale the importance of motion towards a musical goal—the sort of tension and release that is a foundational principle of Western music.

=== I. Hésitant ===
Excerpt from "Hesitant"
Passage spanning conclusion of the second episode and beginning the first refrain

In the second symphony, these ideas manifest in the following way. The first movement, Hésitant, is a series of six episodes, building in intensity throughout the movement. According to Lutosławski,

All the episodes unfold in the same way: a short phrase emerges tentatively and then subsides for a brief moment. Only then does the true beginning of every episode follow. None of the episodes has an actual ending. The growing boldness and mounting momentum of the musical action is followed by a pause, as if the energy had been spent. Then a few tentative attempts are made to take up the episode again. All the attempts are in vain and the theme is abandoned.

Each of the episodes is followed by a refrain played by the double-reed instruments. The dynamic tempos and varied colors of the episodes alternate with the static refrains. The first movement could be summarized as a series of interrupted passages that push toward a climax that never materializes.

=== II. Direct ===
The second movement, Direct, begins while "the last phrase of the first movement still echoes." Lutosławski again offers a cogent explanation of the movement's shape:

The second movement, unlike the first, unfolds continuously without any pauses. Individual musical ideas overlap one another frequently, creating uninterrupted discourse. This development heads straight for the final solution without any digressions. That is why this movement is called Direct.

According to Lutosławski, this second movement subdivides into a series of five overlapping "evolutionary stages". Demarcating the first three of these stages is very difficult, but the fourth and fifth stages are more obvious. The fourth stage begins at downbeat 133 and ends just before downbeat 151; the fifth and final stage begins at downbeat 151 and ends after downbeat 160. Across these five stages, one may observe two significant rhythmic processes: a process of unification from ad libitum playing to metered playing and a process of acceleration from longer sections with sustained material to shorter sections in faster tempos with quicker rhythmic material, producing rhythmic acceleration on two levels, that of microrhythm, the surface rhythms within sections, and on the level of macrorhythm, the lengths of sections. This process pushes to the climax of the movement and the symphony as a whole, which occurs

When the simple rhythm, which has been achieved gradually over a considerable period, is transformed suddenly into an extremely complex rhythmical structure when the whole orchestra begins to play ad libitum. It is as if a building which has been painstakingly put together over a long time suddenly shatters into thousands of fragments.

Harmonically, the climax of this piece is marked by a twelve-tone chord based on 5ths and 6ths that falls away and almost immediately makes another effort. This too is ultimately unsuccessful, and softer and softer chords lead to the end of the piece.

Although the two movements are shockingly different on the surface, their overall shape is remarkably similar. Both movements fail to reach a definitive climax. The first movement's climax never arrives, and the second movement's climactic chords collapse into fitful murmuring.

Given the work's highly individual form and its clear detachment from eighteenth- and nineteenth-century conceptions of the symphony, what makes this a symphony? Lutosławski lists several criteria for a symphony: it must be a large-scale piece – "A ten-minute piece of music shall not be referred to as a symphony"; it must be a closed form, thus excluding much music based on Cage's aesthetic; it must be written for the symphonic orchestra; and most importantly, "it must be properly shaped into a process with a perceptible akcja (i.e., action). By 'action' I understand a purely musical 'plot'...a chain of interrelated musical events."

== Analytical approaches ==
=== Akcja ===
Although Lutosławski has emphasized the importance of akcja to his music, a clear understanding of the concept has yet to coalesce. Most theories return to an analytical approach to musical characters developed by Lutosławski's mentor, Witold Maliszewski. Maliszewski's system of four characters classifies musical passages as either narrative, transitional, introductory, or concluding. Nicholas Reyland suggests that these four classifications can be generalized further for Lutosławski's music into two categories: static and dynamic. Static, or narrative, passages are characterized by sustained harmonies, distinctive motivic ideas, and a lack of obvious goal-direction; the entry of a new narrative passage is "like the entry of a new character in a drama." Narrative passages in Lutosławski's form thus establish musical content, characters, and the "key ideas" – Lutosławski's twentieth-century transformation of the concept of motif, which he loosely defines as consisting of "a small number of notes." Dynamic passages, then, are characterized by changing harmonies, evolving or repeated motivic ideas, shifting dynamic levels, and clear goal-direction. Akcja then, in Reyland's view, consists of the interaction, evolution, and transformation of key ideas throughout a musical work.

Charles Bodman Rae observes a long-range relationship between the pitch classes E♭ and F, heard as a major second at the very beginning of the first movement and as a major ninth at the end of the second movement. He proposes that this latter passage (downbeat 158) functions as a culmination of the entire symphony. A full analysis of this symphony in terms of akcja would trace the development of this and other key ideas (perhaps the first movement's refrain) throughout the work.

Though the titles of the two movements are somewhat indicative, Lutosławski refused to discuss their meaning except in vague terms. In an interview about the symphony with Tadeusz Kaczyński in 1967, he stated that "music is not meant to express anything in an unambiguous manner" and therefore a concrete meaning of the piece "would not have much sense."

=== Register and texture-space ===
Michael Klein proposes that the perception of long-range formal trajectories in Lutosławski's music of the 1960s and 1970s may be enhanced by the analysis of transformations on register, or texture-space. Klein defines three transformations on register — contraction, expansion, and projection — in addition to properties of texture such as field (register from lowest to highest note), density (number of voices or number of pitches in the textural field, depending on context), and compression (how tightly packed the voices are, computed by dividing density by field) to describe the texture in a particular passage. Contraction is defined as the movement inward of one or both of the registral extremes from one passage to another; expansion, then is the movement outward of one or both registral extremes; and projection is a shift in register, i.e. both registral extremes move in the same direction, though not necessarily by the same amount.

=== Limited aleatoricism ===
Concerning the symphony and Lutosławski's compositional techniques, Martin Cooper says that "Lutosławski's controlled randomness is a method which leaves players rather more license than most schoolchildren enjoy in class, while giving the conductor the schoolmaster's task of intervening at roughly fixed intervals."

Symphony No. 2 utilizes a modernistic approach to the Baroque and Classical art of counterpoint, coined by some as "aleatoric counterpoint". Nearly all of Symphony No. 2 is written in limited aleatoric sections called ad libitum by the composer. In each of these sections, no bar lines are marked and each part plays a different length of music. After a certain point each of the performers repeats a segment of his or her part until the conductor signals the transition to a new section, possibly conducted in the traditional manner, possibly ad libitum. Only one section of Symphony No. 2 is conducted in the traditional manner, the fourth "evolutionary" stage of the second movement (downbeats 133–50).

Although each of the parts is relatively simple in terms of rhythm and melody, the composite pitch and rhythmic structures in these ad libitum sections can become complex. Each performer is instructed to play "with the expressive freedom of a solo or a cadenza" – including those playing the same part. Any vertical alignment on the score after the beginning of such a passage is to be ignored by the instrumentalist or the conductor; instead of being controlled via the score, rhythm in these sections (microrhythm) is contributed to by every individual performer. Pitch structures, on the other hand, are strictly pre-ordained by the composer. Analysis of individual parts separates the structural tones from the embellishing tones. The composite constructed of each part's structural tones, in pitch space, is understood as the harmonic complex underpinning the section. For textural/registral analysis, the properties of this harmony represent texture-space in this passage. After performing similar analysis on another passage, one may determine the transformation that relates texture in the two passages.

Although these harmonic complexes may contain all twelve chromatic pitch classes, they tend to feature only a few interval classes between adjacent pitches. Lutosławski has said that the use of more intervals in these harmonies results in sonorities that are "faceless" or that "have no character".

Ad libitum passages on the whole have a very particular role in Lutosławski's music. Most often they represent static, narrative passages with one harmonic complex underpinning them, though some ad libitum passages migrate from one harmonic complex to another. This makes their study particularly important in terms of akcja, although, given their preponderance in Symphony No. 2, perhaps our understanding of the "narrative" character in Lutosławski's music needs to be further refined.

== Farewell to the symphony ==
As Lutosławski's musical career progressed, he began to cement his ideas and beliefs concerning the symphony orchestra, forms, and many other aspects of composition. He believed that there was no sense in writing music that was so difficult to play that the musicians forgot about the importance of musicality. Lutosławski stated that "Music that is easy to play sounds better than difficult music," and then went on to convey his "hope to have some part in helping musicians recapture the sense of pleasure that the playing of music can provide."

Concerning the use of instruments in contemporary pieces, Lutosławski had many opinions. He believed that present day instruments were dated and left little to no room for evolution in composition. He stated that although the instruments in the orchestra can play non-diatonic music, they are not designed for it and to do so requires greater effort. In a similar sense, the string instruments can play music that does not fit in the twelve-tone scale system, but to accomplish that, a new system of playing would have to emerge. Lutosławski also commented on modified symphony instruments and extended technique, saying that altering the use of these "great works of art" is "unnatural" and "jarring".

Symphony No. 2 shows his reverence of classical instruments, with little to no use of the instruments outside of the realm of their "natural" performance techniques, but also begins to foreshadow his travels away from the relic we call orchestra (although he composed two more symphonies after this one). Beginning as far back as the Three Postludes (1959–1964), he began designating pieces "farewell to the orchestra". These ideas led Lutosławski to look ahead to a time when the orchestra would be replaced by an ensemble that could produce what he already heard in his head.

== Discography ==
- Lutosławski, Witold. Jeux venitiens, National Philharmonic Orchestra in Warsaw conducted by Witold Rowicki, 1962; Poemes de Henri Michaux, Polish Radio Choir in Cracow conducted by Witold Lutosławski and Polish Radio National Symphony conducted by Jan Krentz, 1964. Symphony No.2, National Philharmonic Orchestra in Warsaw conducted by Witold Lutosławski, 1968. Poland : Polskie Nagrania Muza, PNCD 041, 1989. Compact disc.
- Lutosławski, Witold. Lutosławski at the Guildhall: Live Recordings of Lutosławski. Guildhall Symphony Orchestra conducted by Wojciech Michniewski. Surrey, England : Somm Recordings, SOMMCD 219, 1999. Compact disc.
- Lutosławski, Witold. Symphony No. 2. National Philharmonic Orchestra conducted by Witold Lutosławski. Warsaw: Muza XL 0453, 196?.
- Lutosławski, Witold. Symphony No. 2. Polish National Radio Symphony Orchestra conducted by Antoni Wit. Hong Kong: Naxos 8.553169, 1994.
- Lutosławski, Witold. Symphony No.2; Symphony No.4. Rundfunk-Sinfonieorchester Saarbrücken conducted by Roman Kofman. Saarländ, Germany: cpo/Saarländischer Rundfunk, cpo 999 386–2, 1997. Compact disc.
- Lutosławski, Witold. Symphony No.2; Piano Concerto; Chantefleurs et Chantefables; Fanfare for the Los Angeles Philharmonic. Los Angeles Philharmonic conducted by Esa-Pekka Salonen. Sony Classical 67189, 1996. Compact disc.
- Lutosławski, Witold. Symphonies Nos 1 and 2; Symphonic Variations; Musique Funébre. Polish Radio Symphony Orchestra conducted by Witold Lutosławski. EMI Matrix 3, 1994. Compact disc.
- Lutosławski, Witold. Sinfonie Nr. 2. Sinfonieorchester des Sűdwestfunks, Baden-Baden conducted by Ernest Bour. Mainz: Wergo WER 60 044, 197?.
- Lutosławski, Witold. Symphonies 2 & 3. Finnish Radio Symphony Orchestra conducted by Hannu Lintu. Helsinki, Ondine ODE 1332-5, 2020.
