= Blues Magoos =

1960s US garage psych band

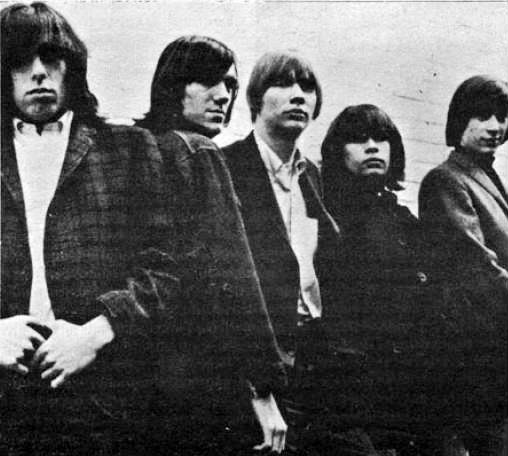
- The band in 1967 (Left to right: Ron Gilbert, Mike Esposito, Geoff Daking, Peppy Castro, Ralph Scala)

Background information
- Origin: The Bronx, New York City, United States
- Genres: Psychedelic rock; garage rock; proto-punk; blues rock; acid rock; garage-psych
- Years active: 1964–1970, 2008–2022
- Labels: Mercury, Verve, Ganim Records, ABC, Repertoire, Collectables
- Past members: Ralph Scala; Emil "Peppy" Thielhelm; Mike Esposito; Geoff Daking; Jon Finnegan; John Leillo; Eric Kaz; Roger Eaton; Richie Dickon; Dennis LePore; Mike Ciliberto; Peter Stuart Kohman; Jim Payne; Ron Gilbert

The Blues Magoos are an American rock group from The Bronx, a borough of New York City, United States. They were at the forefront of the psychedelic music trend, beginning in 1966. They are best known for the hit song "(We Ain't Got) Nothin' Yet", their only single to reach the Billboard top fifty.

== History ==
=== 1964–1971 ===
The band was formed in 1964 as The Trenchcoats after Ralph Scala and Ron Gilbert met on the golf team at Dewitt Clinton High School. The original members were Emil "Peppy" Thielhelm a.k.a. "Peppy" Castro (vocals and guitar), Dennis LePore (lead guitar), Ralph Scala (organ and vocals), Ron Gilbert (bass) and Jon Finnegan (drums). The band made a name for itself in various clubs in Greenwich Village, most notably the Night Owl Cafe. In 1965, the name had been changed to The Bloos Magoos, and by 1966, the band had settled on calling themselves the Blues Magoos. Mike Esposito and Geoff Daking replaced Dennis LePore and Jon Finnegan, respectively, by early 1966.

The band's single "So I'm Wrong and You Are Right" b/w "The People Had No Faces" on Verve Records (both Rick Shorter compositions) did not gain the band much recognition. Verve dropped them shortly thereafter.

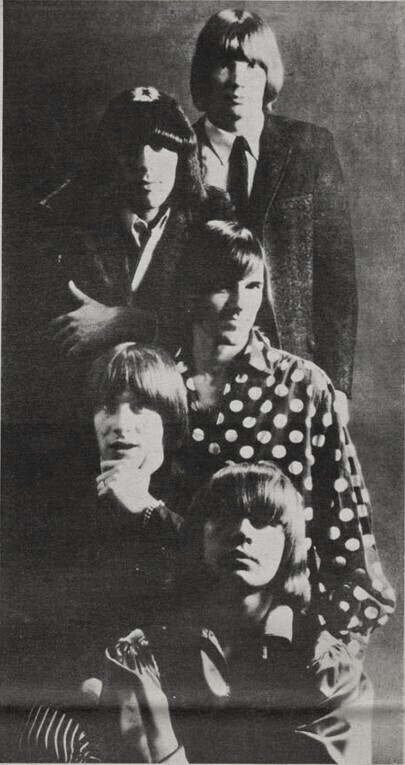
Blues Magoos in 1967. Top to bottom: Daking, Gilbert, Esposito, Scala, Castro

In early 1966, Mercury Records signed the band to a record deal with the help of Bob Wyld and Art Polhemus of Longhair Productions. Their first single, “Tobacco Road” b/w “Sometimes I Think About” was released in June 1966. The group's debut album, Psychedelic Lollipop, was released in November 1966 – becoming one of the first albums to include the word "psychedelic" on the sleeve (after the 13th Floor Elevators' The Psychedelic Sounds of the 13th Floor Elevators and The Deep's Psychedelic Moods, both also from 1966). They played often at the Chess Mate Coffeehouse, a mostly folk venue in Detroit owned by Morrie Widenbaum that also hosted bands such as Southbound Freeway and Siegel-Schwall Blues Band.

The group's most successful song was "(We Ain't Got) Nothin' Yet," which reached number 5 on the U.S. charts, and number 4 in Canada.

The next single by the Blues Magoos was "There's A Chance We Can Make It". By 1967, they appeared on several network television programs, including two Dick Clark–produced series, Where The Action Is and American Bandstand. They also made visits to The Smothers Brothers Comedy Hour, performing "Pipe Dream," and a Kraft Music Hall hosted by Jack Benny. "One by One" was the band's last single to make the charts. Electric Comic Book, their next album, was released on Mercury in April 1967. Starting in June 1967, the Blues Magoos embarked on a tour through the US and Canada with Herman's Hermits and The Who until September of that year. In May 1968, the band released their third album, Basic Blues Magoos. Shortly afterwards, in mid-late 1968, the band split up after disagreements on the musical direction of the band and financial problems.

In early 1969, Castro formed a new band with Eric Kaz, Richie Dickon, John Leillo, and Roger Eaton. The band was signed to ABC Records after agreeing to keep the Blues Magoos name. Also in early 1969, Scala, Gilbert, and Daking moved to Los Angeles, enlisted Ted Munda, and released the "Let Your Love Ride" b/w "Who Do You Love" single on Ganim Records before replacing Munda with Joey Stec, formerly of The Millennium. The new group went their separate ways between 1969 and 1970 after a dispute with ABC Records over the rights to the Blues Magoos name. Ralph Scala, Ron Gilbert, and Joey Stec later played in The Dependables. In 1969, the Castro-led band completed Never Goin' Back To Georgia. Eaton left the band, and the other Blues Magoos used session musicians for the follow-up Gulf Coast Bound. After two further years the band dissolved.

=== 1972–present ===
After a stint with the rock musical Hair and recording with Mercury label mate Exuma (Tony McKay), Peppy Castro formed Barnaby Bye with fellow cast members Bobby and Billy Alessi. The group released two albums on Atlantic Records, Room to Grow (1972) and Touch (1973). In 1981, Castro resurfaced again with the group Balance whose song "Breaking Away" reached No. 22 on the Billboard Hot 100 chart and No. 35 in Canada.

In July 2008, the Blues Magoos, with original members Ralph Scala, Castro and Geoff Daking reunited for the first time in years for two concerts, including one with The Zombies at the Fillmore New York at Irving Plaza in New York City. In December 2009, they traveled to Spain for the Purple Weekend festival.

In 2014, The Blues Magoos released their first new album in 43 years, Psychedelic Resurrection. The Blues Magoos toured in 2015. In 2022, The Blues Magoos officially released their last recording, "Nowhere is Somewhere". The song and accompanying video were featured at the 2021 Woodstock Film Festival.

On February 16, 2024, Ron Gilbert died in Los Angeles, California, as confirmed by the Blues Magoos official Facebook page. As of 2026, he is the only deceased original member of the band.

== Line-ups ==
Blues Magoos Members
(1964–1966)	Ralph Scala - keyboards, vocals; Emil "Peppy" Thielhelm - guitar, vocals; Ron Gilbert - bass; Dennis LePore - guitar; Jon Finnegan - drums & percussion
(1966–1969)	Ralph Scala - keyboards, vocals; Emil "Peppy" Thielhelm - guitar, vocals; Ron Gilbert - bass; Mike Esposito - guitar; Geoff Daking - drums & percussion
(1969–1970)	Emil "Peppy" Thielhelm - guitar, vocals; Roger Eaton - bass; Eric Kaz - keyboards; Richie Dickon - drums & percussion; John Leillo - percussion
(2008–2022)	Ralph Scala - vocals, organ, piano; Emil "Peppy" Thielhelm - guitar, vocals; Geoff Daking - drums & percussion; Mike Ciliberto -guitar, vocals; Peter Stuart Kohman -bass, vocals

== Discography ==
=== Albums ===
- Psychedelic Lollipop (1966) (No. 15 Can., No. 21 US)
- Electric Comic Book (1967) (No. 14 Can., No. 74 US)
- Basic Blues Magoos (1968)
- Never Goin' Back to Georgia (1969)
- Gulf Coast Bound (1970)
- Psychedelic Resurrection (2014)

=== Singles ===
Year	Titles Both sides from same album except where indicated	U.S. Billboard	Canada	Album
1966	"The People Had No Faces" b/w "So I'm Wrong and You Are Right"; Original release on Verve Folkways shown as "The Bloos Magoos"	–	–	Non-album tracks
1966	"Tobacco Road" b/w "Sometimes I Think About"	–	–	Psychedelic Lollipop
1966	"(We Ain't Got) Nothin' Yet" b/w "Gotta Get Away"	5	4	Psychedelic Lollipop
1967	"Pipe Dream" /	60	40	Electric Comic Book
1967	"There's A Chance We Can Make It"	81	–	Electric Comic Book
1967	"So I'm Wrong and You Are Right" b/w "The People Had No Faces"; Second release on Verve as "The Bloos Magoos"	–	–	Non-album tracks
1967	"So I'm Wrong and You Are Right" b/w "The People Had No Faces"; Third release on Verve Folkways as "The Blues Magoos"	–	–	Non-album tracks
1967	"One by One" (re-recording of song from Psychedelic Lollipop) b/w "Dante's Inferno" (Non-album track)	71	56	Non-album tracks
1967	"I Wanna Be There" b/w "Summer Is The Man" (from Electric Comic Book)	133	–	Basic Blues Magoos
1967	"There She Goes" b/w "Life Is Just A Cher O' Bowlies" (from Electric Comic Book)	-	–	Basic Blues Magoos
1967	"Jingle Bells" b/w "Santa Claus Is Coming To Town"	-	–	Non-album tracks
1968	"I Can Hear The Grass Grow" b/w "Yellow Roses"	-	–	Basic Blues Magoos
1969	"Let Your Love Ride" b/w "Who Do You Love"	-	–	Non-album tracks
1969	"Heartbreak Hotel" b/w "I Can Feel It (Feelin' Time)"	-	–	Never Goin' Back To Georgia
1969	"Never Goin' Back To Georgia" b/w "Feelin' Time (I Can Feel It)"	113	–	Never Goin' Back To Georgia
1970	"Gulf Coast Bound" b/w "Sea Breeze Express"	-	–	Gulf Coast Bound
2022	"Nowhere is Somewhere"	-	-	Non-album track
2026	"Only This Time"			

== Re-releases on CD ==
The original group's output on CD is now complete. Repertoire Records has released their three albums in deluxe digi-packages with detailed liner notes. Each CD has bonus tracks which include mono versions of single releases, fan club exclusives, and obscure early recordings. Additionally, Collectables Records still has the doubled-up Psychedelic Lollipop/Electric Comic Book CD for sale and Mercury's Kaleidoscopic Compendium anthology is still available as well. The post-1969 group's output has not been released on CD to date. In 2011 Sundazed Music reissued Psychedelic Lollipop and Electric Comic Book on limited edition (1000 copies) vinyl and CD from the first generation Mercury master tapes with greatly improved sound quality compared to earlier reissues.
