= Psychedelic Lollipop =

Studio album by Blues Magoos
- Released: November 1966
- Recorded: 1966
- Genre: Garage rock; psychedelic rock
- Length: 31:37
- Label: (United States) Mercury (United Kingdom) Fontana (original release); Repertoire (2005 CD reissue) (Germany) Repertoire (1991 CD reissue)
- Producer: Bob Wyld, Art Polhemus

Blues Magoos chronology
| Psychedelic Lollipop (1966) | Electric Comic Book (1967) |

Singles from Psychedelic Lollipop
- 1. "Tobacco Road" Released: June 1966; 2. "(We Ain't Got) Nothin' Yet" Released: October 1966; 3. "One by One" Released: May 1967

Psychedelic Lollipop is the debut album by the American rock band the Blues Magoos, and is one of the first records to have the word “psychedelic” on the sleeve. Their single “(We Ain't Got) Nothin' Yet” was their most successful effort, rising into the Top 10 on many national charts. Guitarist Emil “Peppy” Thielhelm was 16 years old at the time of the single’s release.

"Sometimes I Think About" is credited to members of the band, but is actually a traditional folk song.

== Reception ==
Professional ratings
Review scores
| Source | Rating |
|---|---|
| AllMusic | 3.5/5 stars |

AllMusic critic Mark Deming felt that Blues Magoos sounded more like a solid garage band than a psychedelic band. He especially praised their version of "Tobacco Road". He wrote in his review "Psychedelic Lollipop rarely sounds like a classic, but it's solid stuff — the covers are chosen and played well... Psychedelic Lollipop doesn't sound like the work of a great band, but certainly like one who were better than average, and considering how many bands who cranked out a single like "(We Ain't Got) Nothin' Yet" ended up making albums clogged with filler, it says a lot that even the weakest tracks here show this group had talent, ideas, and the know-how to make them work in the studio."

== Track listing ==
1. "(We Ain't Got) Nothin' Yet" (Mike Esposito, Ron Gilbert, Ralph Scala) – 2:10
2. "Love Seems Doomed" (Esposito, Gilbert, Scala) – 3:02
3. "Tobacco Road" (John D. Loudermilk) – 4:30
4. "Queen of My Nights" (David Blue) – 2:52
5. "I’ll Go Crazy" (James Brown) – 1:58
6. "Gotta Get Away" (Ritchie Adams, Alan Gordon) – 2:35
7. "Sometimes I Think About" (Esposito, Gilbert, Scala) – 3:35
8. "One by One" (Gilbert, Emil Theilhelm) – 2:45
9. "Worried Life Blues" (Big Maceo Merriweather) – 3:45
10. "She’s Coming Home" (Roger Atkins, Helen Miller) – 2:36

== Personnel ==
=== Blues Magoos ===
- Ralph Scala – keyboards, vocals
- Emil “Peppy” Theilhelm – guitar, vocals
- Ron Gilbert – bass guitar, vocals
- Mike Esposito – guitar
- Geoff Daking – drums, percussion

=== Technical ===
- Art Polhemus – producer, engineer
- Bob Wyld – producer, liner notes
- Shelby S Singleton Jr. – executive producer

== Charts ==
Album - Billboard (USA)

| Year | Chart | Position |
|---|---|---|
| 1967 | Pop Albums | 21 |

Album – RPM (Canada)

| Year | Chart | Position |
|---|---|---|
| 1967 | RPM Top 25 LPs | 15 |

Singles - Billboard (USA)

| Year | Single | Chart | Position |
|---|---|---|---|
| 1967 | "(We Ain't Got) Nothin' Yet" | Pop Singles | 5 |
| 1967 | "One By One" | Pop Singles | 71 |

Singles – RPM (Canada)

| Year | Single | Chart | Position |
|---|---|---|---|
| 1967 | "(We Ain't Got) Nothin' Yet" | Canada RPM 100 | 4 |
| 1967 | "One By One" | Canada RPM 100 | 56 |
