= (We Ain't Got) Nothin' Yet =

1966 single by the Blues Magoos

- One of the A-side labels of the US single

Single by Blues Magoos

from the album Psychedelic Lollipop
- B-side: "Gotta Get Away"
- Released: October 1966
- Genre: Garage rock; proto-punk; psychedelic rock
- Length: 2:10
- Label: Mercury
- Songwriters: Ron Gilbert; Ralph Scala; Mike Esposito
- Producers: Bob Wyld; Art Polhemus

Blues Magoos singles chronology
"Tobacco Road" (1966)	"(We Ain't Got) Nothin' Yet" (1966)	"Pipe Dream" (1967)

"(We Ain't Got) Nothin' Yet" is a song by the American rock band Blues Magoos, released in October 1966. It was a chart hit in the United States in February 1967. It was written by Ron Gilbert, Ralph Scala and Mike Esposito. It reached number 5 on the Hot 100.

== Background ==
The Vox Continental organ riff also appeared in the Liverpool Five's single "She's Mine" (released that same year).

== Charts ==
Chart (1967)	Peak position
Canada RPM Top Singles	4
New Zealand (Listener)	9
U.S. Billboard Hot 100	5

== The Spectres version ==
"(We Ain't Got) Nothin' Yet"

Single by the Spectres
- Released: 10 February 1967
- Genre: Rock
- Length: 2:18
- Label: Piccadilly
- Songwriters: Gilbert; Scala; Esposito
- Producer: John Schroeder

The Spectres singles chronology
"Hurdy Gurdy Man" (1966)	"(We Ain't Got) Nothin' Yet" (1967)	"Almost but Not Quite There" (1967)

The British rock band the Spectres (a predecessor of Status Quo) released a cover of the song in February 1967.

=== Track listing ===
1. "(We Ain't Got) Nothin' Yet" (Gilbert/Scala/Esposito) – 2:18
2. "I Want It" (Lynes/Coghlan/Rossi/Lancaster) – 3:01

== See also ==
- List of 1960s one-hit wonders in the United States
