= Billboard Year-End Hot 100 singles of 1967 =

Ranking of recorded music

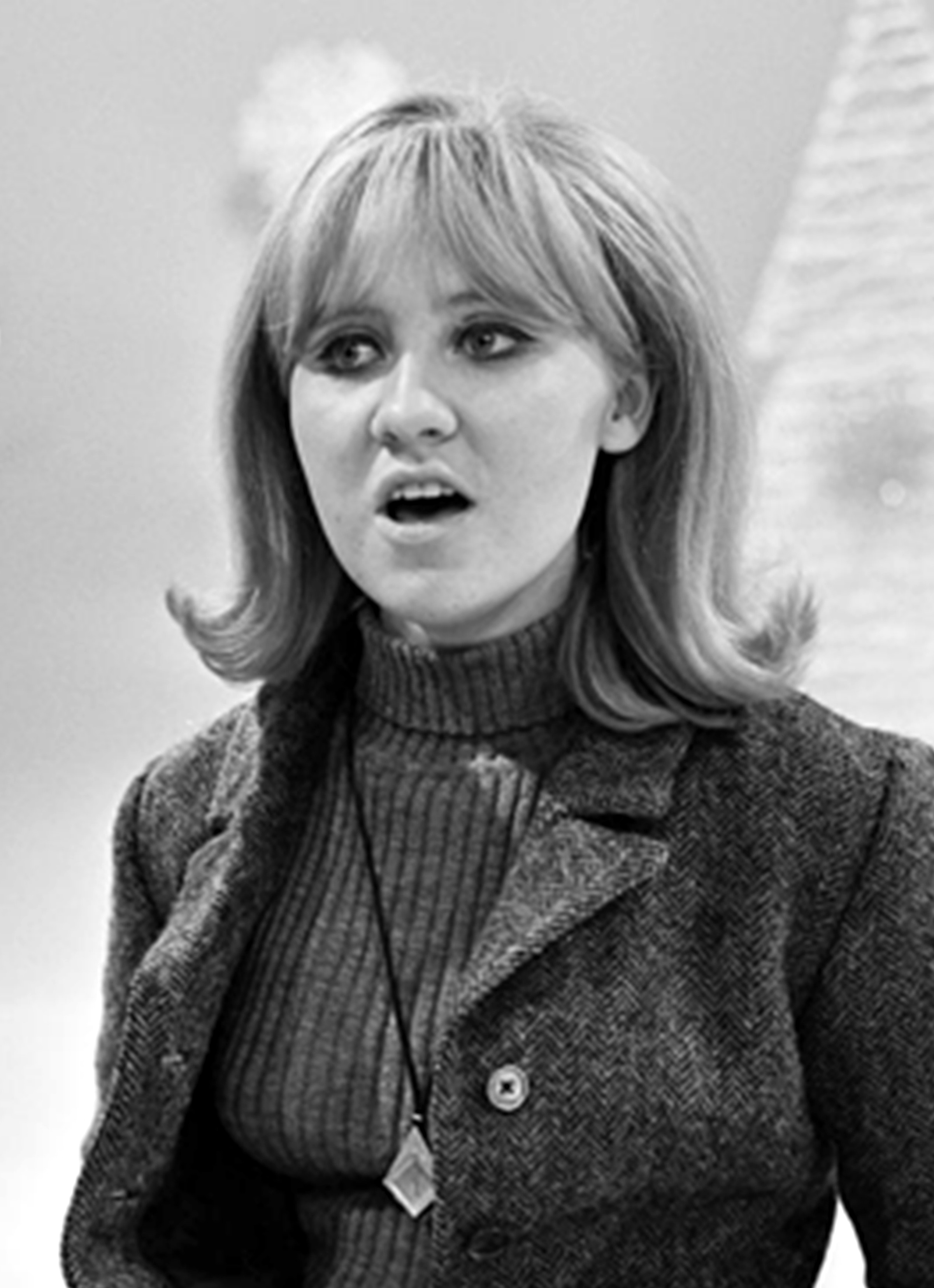
"To Sir With Love" by Lulu (pictured) was the number one song of 1967.

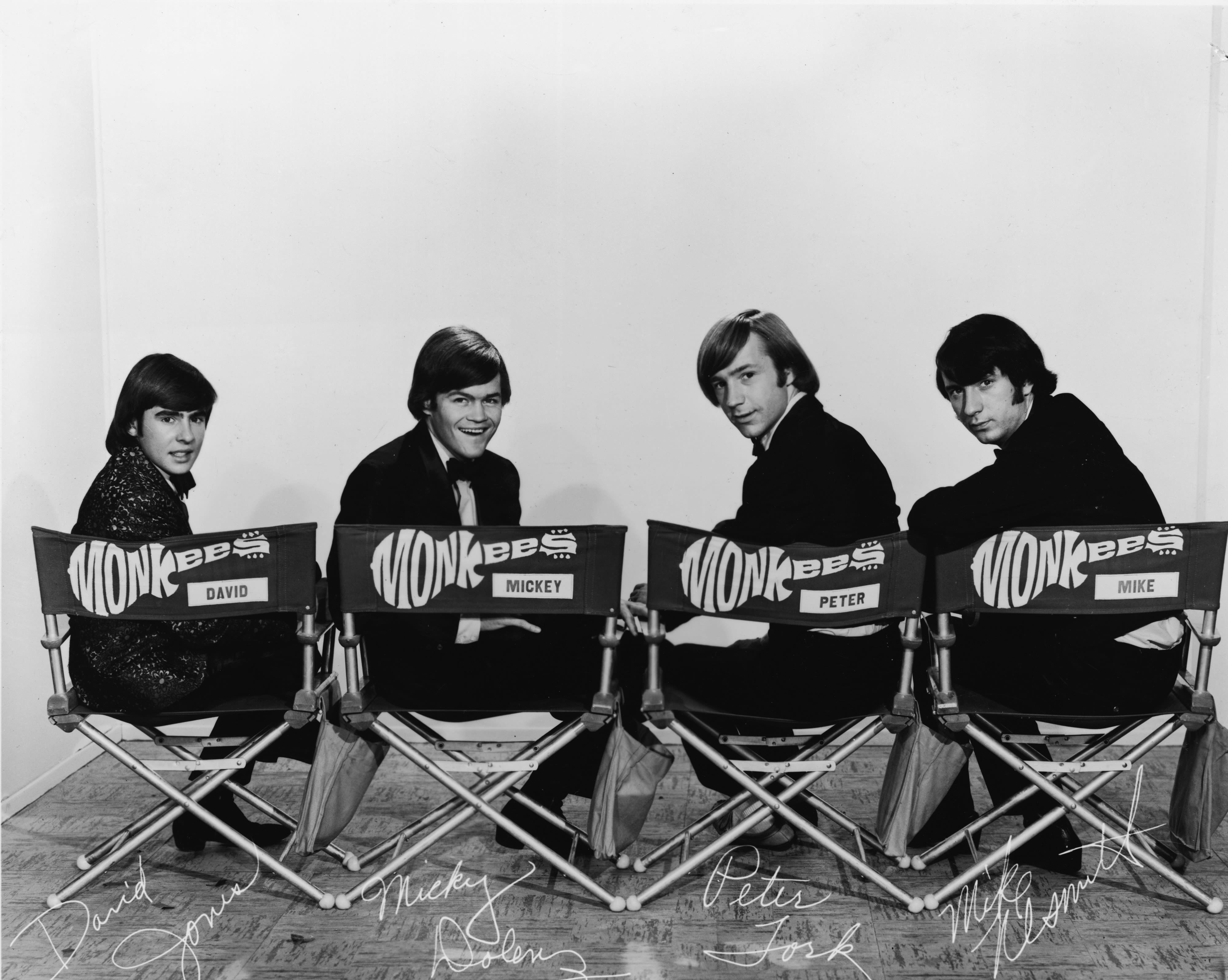
The Monkees (pictured) had four songs on the year-end chart ("I'm a Believer" at number five, "A Little Bit Me, a Little Bit You" at number 60, "Pleasant Valley Sunday" at number 74, and "Daydream Believer" at number 94), the most of any artist that year.

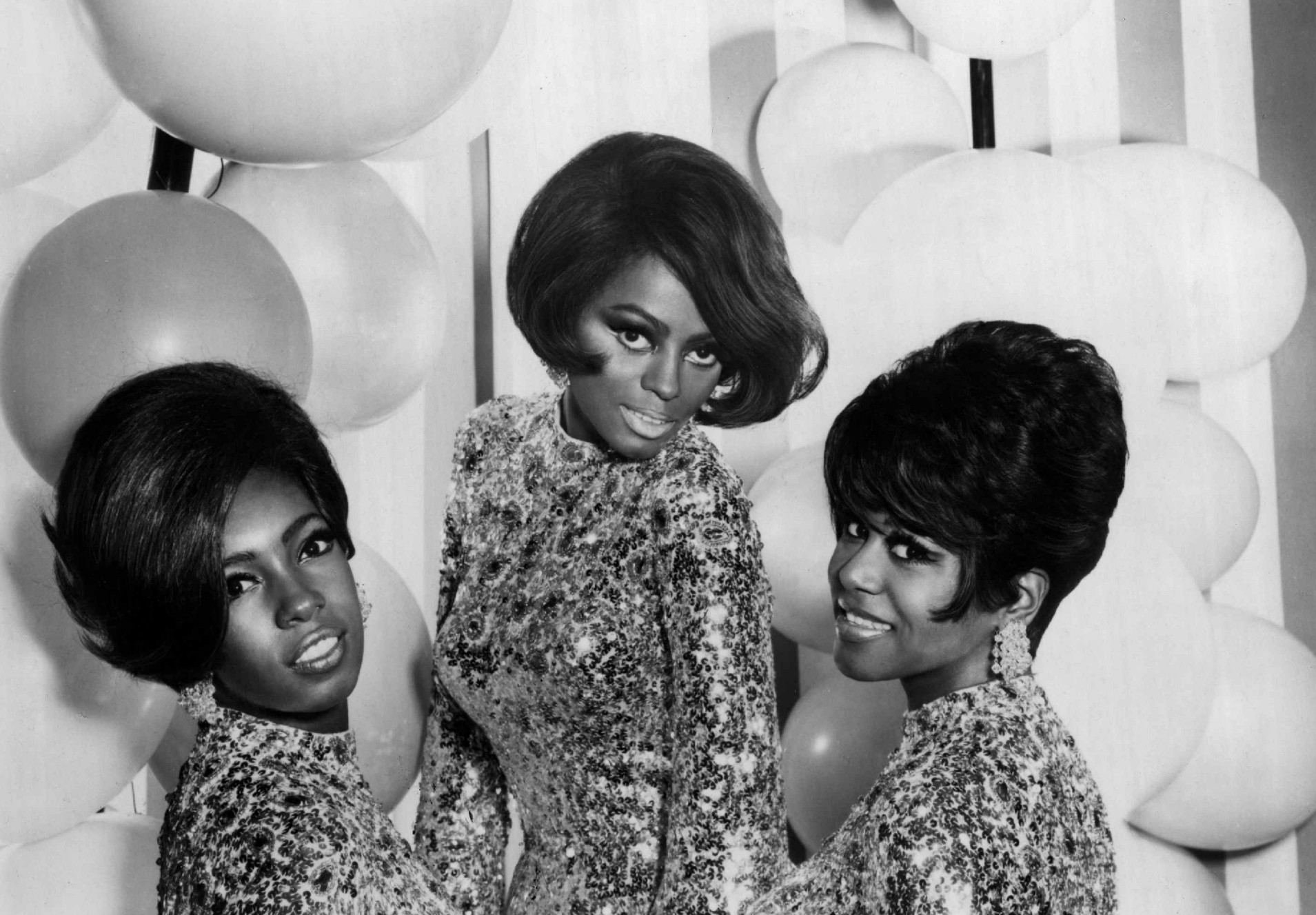
"Love Is Here and Now You're Gone", "The Happening", and "Reflections", all by The Supremes (pictured), appeared on the year-end list at numbers 26, 29, and 41, respectively.

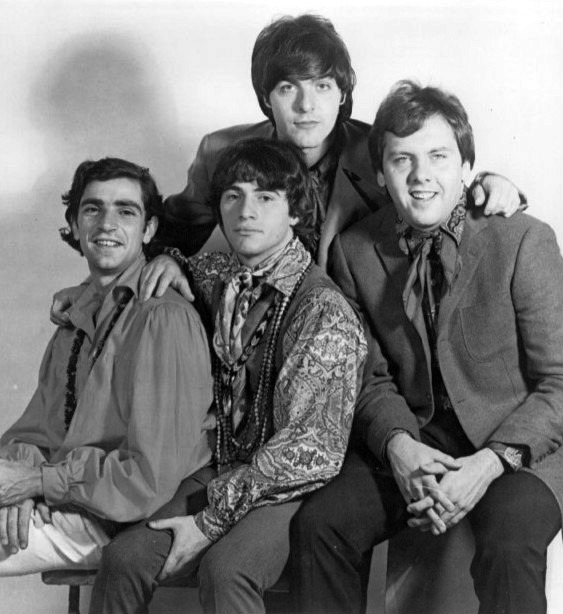
The Young Rascals' (pictured) three songs on the chart included "Groovin'" (number nine), "I've Been Lonely Too Long" (number 54), "How Can I Be Sure" (number 63).

This is a list of Billboard magazine's Top Hot 100 songs of 1967.

No.	Title	Artist(s)
1	"To Sir With Love"	Lulu
2	"The Letter"	The Box Tops
3	"Ode to Billie Joe"	Bobbie Gentry
4	"Windy"	The Association
5	"I'm a Believer"	The Monkees
6	"Light My Fire"	The Doors
7	"Somethin' Stupid"	Frank & Nancy Sinatra
8	"Happy Together"	The Turtles
9	"Groovin'"	The Young Rascals
10	"Can't Take My Eyes Off You"	Frankie Valli
11	"Little Bit O' Soul"	The Music Explosion
12	"I Think We're Alone Now"	Tommy James and the Shondells
13	"Respect"	Aretha Franklin
14	"I Was Made to Love Her"	Stevie Wonder
15	"Come Back When You Grow Up"	Bobby Vee
16	"Kind of a Drag"	The Buckinghams
17	"Sweet Soul Music"	Arthur Conley
18	"Expressway to Your Heart"	Soul Survivors
19	"Soul Man"	Sam & Dave
20	"Never My Love"	The Association
21	"Apples, Peaches, Pumpkin Pie"	Jay & the Techniques
22	"Come On Down to My Boat"	Every Mother's Son
23	"Incense and Peppermints"	Strawberry Alarm Clock
24	"Ruby Tuesday"	The Rolling Stones
25	"It Must Be Him"	Vikki Carr
26	"Love Is Here and Now You're Gone"	The Supremes
27	"For What It's Worth"	Buffalo Springfield
28	"Gimme Little Sign"	Brenton Wood
29	"The Happening"	The Supremes
30	"All You Need Is Love"	The Beatles
31	"Release Me"	Engelbert Humperdinck
32	"Your Precious Love"	Marvin Gaye & Tammi Terrell
33	"Somebody to Love"	Jefferson Airplane
34	"Get on Up"	The Esquires
35	"Brown Eyed Girl"	Van Morrison
36	"Jimmy Mack"	Martha and the Vandellas
37	"I Got Rhythm"	The Happenings
38	"A Whiter Shade of Pale"	Procol Harum
39	"Don't You Care"	The Buckinghams
40	"Then You Can Tell Me Goodbye"	The Casinos
41	"Reflections"	The Supremes
42	"On a Carousel"	The Hollies
43	"Please Love Me Forever"	Bobby Vinton
44	"Alfie"	Dionne Warwick
45	"Silence Is Golden"	The Tremeloes
46	"My Cup Runneth Over"	Ed Ames
47	"Up, Up and Away"	The 5th Dimension
48	"San Francisco (Be Sure to Wear Flowers in Your Hair)"	Scott McKenzie
49	"The Rain, the Park & Other Things"	The Cowsills
50	"There's a Kind of Hush"	Herman's Hermits
51	"Mercy, Mercy, Mercy"	The Buckinghams
52	"This Is My Song"	Petula Clark
53	"(Your Love Keeps Lifting Me) Higher and Higher"	Jackie Wilson
54	"I've Been Lonely Too Long"	The Young Rascals
55	"Penny Lane"	The Beatles
56	"You're My Everything"	The Temptations
57	"Georgy Girl"	The Seekers
58	"Western Union"	Five Americans
59	"Baby I Love You"	Aretha Franklin
60	"A Little Bit Me, a Little Bit You"	The Monkees
61	"California Nights"	Lesley Gore
62	"Dedicated to the One I Love"	The Mamas & the Papas
63	"How Can I Be Sure"	The Young Rascals
64	"Carrie Anne"	The Hollies
65	"(We Ain't Got) Nothin' Yet"	Blues Magoos
66	"Friday on My Mind"	The Easybeats
67	"Soul Finger"	Bar-Kays
68	"Gimme Some Lovin'"	The Spencer Davis Group
69	"Let It Out (Let It All Hang Out)"	The Hombres
70	"Let's Live for Today"	The Grass Roots
71	"Close Your Eyes"	Peaches & Herb
72	"Groovin'"	Booker T. & the M.G.'s
73	"Funky Broadway"	Wilson Pickett
74	"Pleasant Valley Sunday"	The Monkees
75	"I Never Loved a Man (The Way I Love You)"	Aretha Franklin
76	"Tell It Like It Is"	Aaron Neville
77	"Cold Sweat"	James Brown
78	"She'd Rather Be with Me"	The Turtles
79	"98.6"	Keith
80	"Here We Go Again"	Ray Charles
81	"White Rabbit"	Jefferson Airplane
82	"Bernadette"	Four Tops
83	"The Beat Goes On"	Sonny & Cher
84	"Snoopy Vs. The Red Baron"	The Royal Guardsmen
85	"Society's Child"	Janis Ian
86	"Girl, You'll Be a Woman Soon"	Neil Diamond
87	"Ain't No Mountain High Enough"	Marvin Gaye & Tammi Terrell
88	"I Take It Back"	Sandy Posey
89	"Here Comes My Baby"	The Tremeloes
90	"Everlasting Love"	Robert Knight
91	"I Dig Rock and Roll Music"	Peter, Paul and Mary
92	"Little Ole Man (Uptight, Everything's Alright)"	Bill Cosby
93	"I Had Too Much to Dream (Last Night)"	The Electric Prunes
94	"Daydream Believer"	The Monkees
95	"Baby I Need Your Lovin'"	Johnny Rivers
96	"Mirage"	Tommy James and the Shondells
97	"Green, Green Grass of Home"	Tom Jones
98	"I Can See for Miles"	The Who
99	"Don't Sleep in the Subway"	Petula Clark
100	"Thank the Lord for the Night Time"	Neil Diamond

== See also ==
- 1967 in music
- List of Billboard Hot 100 number-one singles of 1967
- List of Billboard Hot 100 top-ten singles in 1967
