= List of Billboard Hot 100 top-ten singles in 1967 =

This is a list of singles that have peaked in the Top 10 of the Billboard Hot 100 during 1967.

Aretha Franklin – who was introduced to the mainstream that year – scored five top ten hits during the year with "I Never Loved a Man (The Way I Love You)", "Respect", "Baby I Love You", "(You Make Me Feel Like) A Natural Woman", and "Chain of Fools", the most among all other artists.

== Top-ten singles ==
- (#) – 1967 Year-end top 10 single position and rank

Top ten entry date	Single	Artist(s)	Peak	Peak date	Weeks in top ten
Singles from 1966
December 31	"Tell It Like It Is"	Aaron Neville	2	January 28	8
December 31	"Good Thing"	Paul Revere & the Raiders	4	January 14	6
Singles from 1967
January 7	"Words of Love"	The Mamas and the Papas	5	January 21	5
January 7	"Standing in the Shadows of Love"	Four Tops	6	January 21	5
January 14	"Georgy Girl"	The Seekers	2	February 4	8
January 21	"Nashville Cats"	The Lovin' Spoonful	8	January 28	2
January 21	"Tell It to the Rain"	The Four Seasons	10	January 21	1
January 28	"Kind of a Drag"	The Buckinghams	1	February 18	7
January 28	"(We Ain't Got) Nothin' Yet"	Blues Magoos	5	February 11	5
February 4	"98.6"	Keith	7	February 11	3
February 11	"Ruby Tuesday"	The Rolling Stones	1	March 4	7
February 11	"Love Is Here and Now You're Gone"	The Supremes	1	March 11	7
February 11	"The Beat Goes On"	Sonny & Cher	6	February 25	4
February 18	"Gimme Some Lovin'"	The Spencer Davis Group	7	February 25	3
February 25	"Baby I Need Your Lovin'"	Johnny Rivers	3	March 11	5
February 25	"Then You Can Tell Me Goodbye"	The Casinos	6	March 11	4
March 4	"Sock It to Me-Baby!"	Mitch Ryder and the Detroit Wheels	6	March 25	4
March 11	"Penny Lane"	The Beatles	1	March 18	5
March 11	"Happy Together" (#8)	The Turtles	1	March 25	9
March 11	"Dedicated to the One I Love"	The Mamas and the Papas	2	March 25	6
March 11	"My Cup Runneth Over"	Ed Ames	8	March 25	3
March 18	"There's a Kind of Hush"	Herman's Hermits	4	March 25	4
March 25	"For What It's Worth"	Buffalo Springfield	7	March 25	2
April 1	"Somethin' Stupid" (#7)	Frank Sinatra & Nancy Sinatra	1	April 15	9
April 1	"This Is My Song"	Petula Clark	3	April 15	5
April 1	"Bernadette"	Four Tops	4	April 8	5
April 1	"Western Union"	Five Americans	5	April 22	5
April 1	"Strawberry Fields Forever"	The Beatles	8	April 1	1
April 8	"A Little Bit Me, a Little Bit You"	The Monkees	2	April 29	6
April 8	"I Think We're Alone Now"	Tommy James and the Shondells	4	April 22	6
April 15	"I Never Loved a Man (The Way I Love You)"	Aretha Franklin	9	April 15	2
April 15	"Jimmy Mack"	Martha and the Vandellas	10	April 15	3
April 22	"Sweet Soul Music"	Arthur Conley	2	May 13	7
April 29	"The Happening"	The Supremes	1	May 13	6
May 6	"Don't You Care"	The Buckinghams	6	May 13	3
May 6	"You Got What It Takes"	The Dave Clark Five	7	May 13	3
May 6	"Close Your Eyes"	Peaches & Herb	8	May 6	3
May 6	"I'm a Man"	The Spencer Davis Group	10	May 6	1
May 13	"Groovin'" (#9)	The Young Rascals	1	May 20	9
May 13	"I Got Rhythm"	The Happenings	3	May 27	6
May 20	"Respect"	Aretha Franklin	1	June 3	7
May 20	"Release Me"	Engelbert Humperdinck	4	May 27	5
May 27	"Creeque Alley"	The Mamas and the Papas	5	June 3	3
May 27	"Him or Me – What's It Gonna Be?"	Paul Revere & the Raiders	5	June 10	3
May 27	"Girl, You'll Be a Woman Soon"	Neil Diamond	10	May 27	1
June 3	"Somebody to Love"	Jefferson Airplane	5	June 17	4
June 3	"All I Need"	The Temptations	8	June 17	3
June 10	"Little Bit O' Soul"	The Music Explosion	2	July 8	9
June 10	"She'd Rather Be with Me"	The Turtles	3	June 17	4
June 17	"Windy" (#4)	The Association	1	July 1	9
June 17	"Mirage"	Tommy James and the Shondells	10	June 17	1
June 24	"Can't Take My Eyes Off You" (#10)	Frankie Valli	2	July 22	8
June 24	"San Francisco (Be Sure to Wear Flowers in Your Hair)"	Scott McKenzie	4	July 1	5
June 24	"Let's Live for Today"	The Grass Roots	8	July 1	3
June 24	"Sunday Will Never Be the Same"	Spanky and Our Gang	9	June 24	1
July 1	"Don't Sleep in the Subway"	Petula Clark	5	July 8	3
July 1	"Come on Down to My Boat"	Every Mother's Son	6	July 8	4
July 8	"Up, Up and Away"	The 5th Dimension	7	July 8	4
July 8	"The Tracks of My Tears"	Johnny Rivers	10	July 8	1
July 15	"Light My Fire" (#6)	The Doors	1	July 29	9
July 15	"A Whiter Shade of Pale"	Procol Harum	5	July 29	7
July 15	"C'mon Marianne"	The Four Seasons	9	July 15	3
July 22	"I Was Made to Love Her"	Stevie Wonder	2	July 29	7
July 29	"Mercy, Mercy, Mercy"	The Buckinghams	5	August 12	4
July 29	"White Rabbit"	Jefferson Airplane	8	July 29	2
August 5	"All You Need Is Love"	The Beatles	1	August 19	7
August 5	"Pleasant Valley Sunday"	The Monkees	3	August 19	5
August 12	"Carrie Anne"	The Hollies	9	August 12	1
August 12	"A Girl Like You"	The Young Rascals	10	August 12	2
August 19	"Ode to Billie Joe" (#3)	Bobbie Gentry	1	August 26	9
August 19	"Baby I Love You"	Aretha Franklin	4	September 9	5
August 19	"Cold Sweat"	James Brown	7	August 26	3
August 26	"Reflections"	Diana Ross & The Supremes	2	September 9	7
August 26	"You're My Everything"	The Temptations	6	September 16	5
September 2	"Come Back When You Grow Up"	Bobby Vee	3	September 9	7
September 9	"The Letter" (#2)	The Box Tops	1	September 23	8
September 9	"Apples, Peaches, Pumpkin Pie"	Jay & the Techniques	6	September 23	5
September 9	"San Franciscan Nights"	Eric Burdon & The Animals	9	September 16	2
September 16	"Funky Broadway"	Wilson Pickett	8	September 30	3
September 23	"Never My Love"	The Association	2	October 7	8
September 23	"(Your Love Keeps Lifting Me) Higher and Higher"	Jackie Wilson	6	October 7	4
September 23	"I Dig Rock and Roll Music"	Peter, Paul and Mary	9	September 23	2
September 30	"Brown Eyed Girl"	Van Morrison	10	September 30	1
October 7	"Little Ole Man (Uptight, Everything's Alright)"	Bill Cosby	4	October 14	3
October 7	"How Can I Be Sure"	The Young Rascals	4	October 21	4
October 7	"Gimme Little Sign"	Brenton Wood	9	October 14	3
October 14	"To Sir, with Love" (#1)	Lulu	1	October 21	9
October 14	"Soul Man"	Sam & Dave	2	November 4	8
October 21	"It Must Be Him"	Vikki Carr	3	November 4	6
October 21	"Expressway to Your Heart"	The Soul Survivors	4	November 4	6
October 21	"Your Precious Love"	Marvin Gaye & Tammi Terrell	5	November 4	5
October 28	"Incense and Peppermints"	Strawberry Alarm Clock	1	November 25	9
October 28	"(You Make Me Feel Like) A Natural Woman"	Aretha Franklin	8	November 4	3
November 4	"The Rain, The Park & Other Things"	The Cowsills	2	December 2	8
November 4	"Please Love Me Forever"	Bobby Vinton	6	November 18	5
November 18	"I Say a Little Prayer"	Dionne Warwick	4	December 9	6
November 18	"I Can See for Miles"	The Who	9	November 25	3
November 25	"Daydream Believer"	The Monkees	1	December 2	10
December 2	"I Heard It Through the Grapevine"	Gladys Knight & the Pips	2	December 16	9
December 2	"An Open Letter to My Teenage Son"	Victor Lundberg	10	December 2	2
December 9	"Hello, Goodbye"	The Beatles	1	December 30	8
December 9	"I Second That Emotion"	Smokey Robinson & The Miracles	4	December 16	7
December 9	"In and Out of Love"	Diana Ross & The Supremes	9	December 9	2
December 16	"Boogaloo Down Broadway"	The Fantastic Johnny C	7	December 23	4
December 16	"You Better Sit Down Kids"	Cher	9	December 23	2
December 30	"Skinny Legs and All"	Joe Tex	10	December 30	3

=== 1966 peaks ===
List of Billboard Hot 100 top ten singles in 1967 which peaked in 1966
Top ten entry date	Single	Artist(s)	Peak	Peak date	Weeks in top ten
November 12	"Winchester Cathedral"	The New Vaudeville Band	1	December 3	10
November 26	"Mellow Yellow"	Donovan	2	December 10	7
December 10	"That's Life"	Frank Sinatra	4	December 24	6
December 17	"I'm a Believer" (#5)	The Monkees	1	December 31	12
December 17	"Sugar Town"	Nancy Sinatra	5	December 31	6
December 24	"Snoopy vs. the Red Baron"	The Royal Guardsmen	2	December 31	8

=== 1968 peaks ===
List of Billboard Hot 100 top ten singles in 1967 which peaked in 1968
Top ten entry date	Single	Artist(s)	Peak	Peak date	Weeks in top ten
December 23	"Woman, Woman"	Gary Puckett & The Union Gap	4	January 13	8
December 30	"Judy in Disguise (With Glasses)"	John Fred and his Playboy Band	1	January 20	8
December 30	"Chain of Fools"	Aretha Franklin	2	January 20	7
December 30	"Bend Me, Shape Me"	The American Breed	5	January 27	7

== See also ==
- 1967 in music
- List of Billboard Hot 100 number ones of 1967
- Billboard Year-End Hot 100 singles of 1967
