= Claes Dieden =

Swedish singer-songwriter (1942–2021)

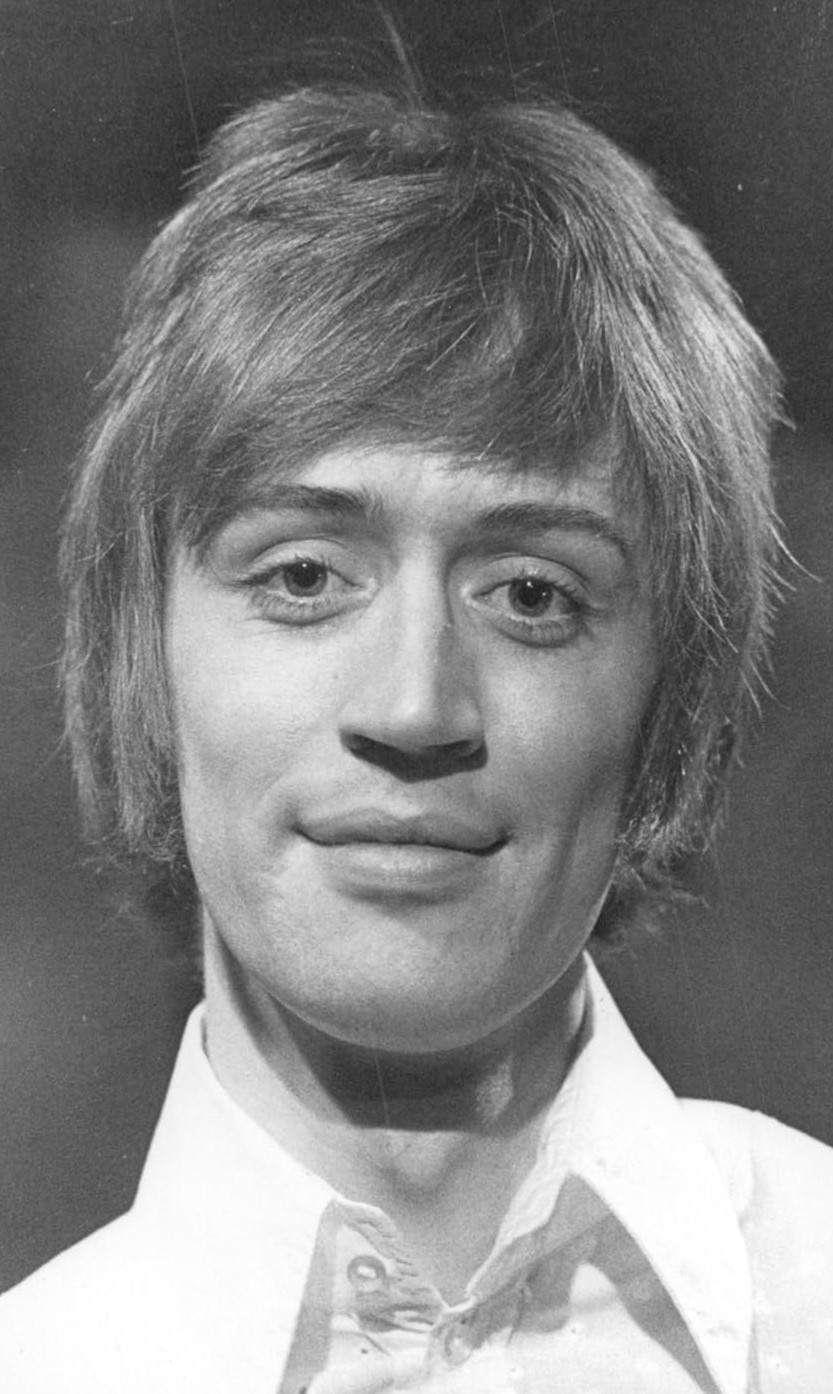
- Dieden in 1970

Background information
- Born: Claes Ove Dieden; 4 June 1942; Stockholm, Sweden
- Died: 11 March 2021 (aged 78) Stockholm, Sweden
- Genres: Rock; pop
- Occupations: Musician; radio presenter
- Instruments: Guitar; vocals
- Years active: 1964–2021
- Labels: Olga Records

Claes Ove Dieden (4 June 1942 – 11 March 2021) was a Swedish singer-songwriter, best known for his cover of "Da Doo Ron Ron" which became a hit in Sweden in 1969. Several of his compositions were recorded and saw commercial success by other groups.

== Biography ==
Claes Dieden was born on 4 June 1942 in Stockholm, Sweden. He grew up in the neighborhood of Östermalm, where he'd largely remain for the rest of his life. He became interested in music and radio broadcasting from an early age which eventually landed him a job at national broadcaster Sveriges Radio in the early 1960s. Additionally, he had started playing guitar. He met Roger Wallis at Sveriges Radio and bonded with him over their shared passion for music, which eventually resulted in the duo forming a band in 1965.

The band, named Science Poption, also included vocalist Anders Gellner, bassist Björn Stolt and drummer Ola Brunkert, who would go on to record with ABBA. In the band, Dieden played lead guitar, primarily using a Rickenbacker 330. During their tenure with the band, both Wallis and Dieden faced criticism as many other bands believed that they played their own records during radio shows to plug them and sell them, something they both would deny. The band members' age was considered a major reason to why they did not score a hit with their first few singles, though they finally managed to have a hit in 1967 with the song "Buckingham Palace", adapted from the book When We Were Very Young. The band broke up during the autumn of 1967 after their final single had failed to become a hit.

Dieden was then discovered by Åke Gerhard, manager for the Hep Stars who liked Dieden's vocal talents enough to sign him onto his record label Olga shortly after the breakup of Science Poption. His first single for the label, a cover of "Da Doo Ron Ron", became a surprise hit for him, reaching number 1 on radio chart Tio i Topp and number two on Kvällstoppen, the sales chart he had hosted only a few months prior. Though his only other charting song was a cover of "Do Wah Diddy Diddy", which reached number 14 on Tio i Topp, Gerhard was so impressed with Dieden that two albums with his materials were put out on the label. A third album followed in 1971 on RCA Victor, which came to be his final album.

During the early to mid 1970s, Dieden's musical output largely diminished after which he took up a career as a radio host and also recorded several commercials which could be heard on almost all public radio stations in Sweden. This would come to be his livelihood for the remainder of his life. Dieden died at the age of 78 on 11 March 2021, after fighting Alzheimer's disease for a short period of time.

== Songwriting and studio work ==
In addition to writing most of his and Science Poption's material, Dieden also acted as an outside writer for a few groups and artists at the time, most notably Slam Creepers featuring Björn Skifs, who managed to have a huge hit with his song "It's Saturday" in the early months of 1968. Additionally, he composed the ballad "Created By You", which appeared on Tages fifth studio album Studio in 1967; it was the only non-original composition on the album.

Dieden met producer Bengt Palmers after he was employed as the in-house producer at Olga in 1968. Together, they wrote and produced most of singer Eleanor Bodel's musical output. Through Palmers, Dieden had a chance to contribute backing vocals to the iconic "ooga-chacka" vocals of Blue Swede's 1973 cover of "Hooked on a Feeling" which reached number 1 on the Billboard Hot 100.

== Discography ==
- Da Doo Ron Ron (1969)
- First Claes (1970)
- Helsvenska Hugskott-Claes Dieden På Nya Äfventyr (1971)
