= Hooked on a Feeling =

Hooked on a Feeling may refer to:

- "Hooked on a Feeling" (song), by B. J. Thomas, 1968; covered by Blue Swede, 1973
- Hooked on a Feeling (Blue Swede album), 1974
- Hooked on a Feeling (David Hasselhoff album), 1997
