= Reservoir Dogs (soundtrack) =

1992 soundtrack album

Reservoir Dogs: Original Motion Picture Soundtrack

Soundtrack album by Various artists
- Released: October 13, 1992
- Genre: Pop rock
- Length: 30:50
- Label: MCA

Professional ratings
Review scores
Source	Rating
AllMusic	link

Reservoir Dogs: Original Motion Picture Soundtrack is the soundtrack to Quentin Tarantino's 1992 film Reservoir Dogs, released on October 13, 1992, by MCA Records. The film contains a mix of pop rock music from the 1970s, intercut with dialogue from the film and a radio-style voiceover by Steven Wright. In 2024, the soundtrack was included in Rolling Stone's list of the 101 Greatest Soundtracks of All Time.

== Composition ==
Reservoir Dogs: Original Motion Picture Soundtrack was the first soundtrack for a Tarantino film and set the structure his later soundtracks would follow. This includes the extensive use of snippets of dialogue from the film. The soundtrack has selections of songs from the 1960s to '80s. Only the group Bedlam made new recordings for the film. Reasoning that the film takes place over a weekend, Tarantino decided to set it to a fictional radio station 'K-Billy' (presumably KBLY)'s show "K-Billy's Super Sounds of the Seventies Weekend", a themed weekend show of broadcasts of songs from the seventies. The radio station played a prominent role in the film. The DJ for the radio was chosen to be Steven Wright, a comedian known for his deadpan delivery of jokes.

An unusual feature of the soundtrack was the choice of songs; Tarantino has said that he feels the music to be a counterpoint to the on-screen violence and action. He also stated that he wished for the film to have a 1950s feel while using '70s music. A prominent instance of this is the torture scene to the tune of "Stuck in the Middle with You".

== Track listing ==
No.	Title	Writer(s)	Artist	Length
1.	"And Now Little Green Bag..." (Dialogue)	Quentin Tarantino; Roger Avary	Steven Wright	0:15
2.	"Little Green Bag"	Jan Visser; Hans Bouwens	George Baker Selection	3:15
3.	"Rock Flock of Five" (Dialogue)	Quentin Tarantino; Roger Avary	Steven Wright	0:11
4.	"Hooked on a Feeling"	Mark James	Blue Swede	2:53
5.	"Bohemiath" (Dialogue)	Quentin Tarantino; Roger Avary	Steven Wright	0:34
6.	"I Gotcha"	Joe Tex	Joe Tex	2:27
7.	"Magic Carpet Ride"	John Kay; Rushton Moreve	Bedlam	5:10
8.	"Madonna Speech" (Dialogue)	Quentin Tarantino	Quentin Tarantino, Edward Bunker, Lawrence Tierney, Steve Buscemi, and Harvey Keitel	0:59
9.	"Fool for Love"	Bob Regan; Sandy Rogers	Sandy Rogers	3:25
10.	"Super Sounds" (Dialogue)	Quentin Tarantino; Roger Avary	Steven Wright	0:19
11.	"Stuck in the Middle with You"	Gerry Rafferty; Joe Egan	Stealers Wheel	3:23
12.	"Harvest Moon"	Jay Joyce	Bedlam	2:38
13.	"Let's Get a Taco" (Dialogue)	Quentin Tarantino	Harvey Keitel and Tim Roth	1:02
14.	"Keep on Truckin'" (Dialogue)	Quentin Tarantino; Roger Avary	Steven Wright	0:16
15.	"Coconut"	Harry Nilsson	Harry Nilsson	3:50
16.	"Home of Rock" (Dialogue)	Quentin Tarantino; Roger Avary	Steven Wright	0:05
Total length:				30:50

=== Certifications ===
Region	Certification	Certified units/sales
Australia (ARIA)	Platinum	70,000^{^}
Canada (Music Canada)	Gold	50,000^{^}
New Zealand (RMNZ)	Platinum	15,000^{^}
Spain (Promusicae)	Gold	50,000^{^}
United Kingdom (BPI)	Platinum	300,000^{^}
United States	—	863,000
^{^} Shipments figures based on certification alone.
