= List of Cash Box Top 100 number-one singles of 1967 =

These are the number-one singles of 1967 according to the Top 100 Singles chart in Cash Box magazine.

| Issue date | Song | Artist |
|---|---|---|
| January 7 | "I'm a Believer" | The Monkees |
| January 14 | "I'm a Believer" | The Monkees |
| January 21 | "I'm a Believer" | The Monkees |
| January 28 | "I'm a Believer" | The Monkees |
| February 4 | "I'm a Believer" | The Monkees |
| February 11 | "I'm a Believer" | The Monkees |
| February 18 | "Georgy Girl" | The Seekers |
| February 25 | "Ruby Tuesday" | The Rolling Stones |
| March 4 | "Love Is Here and Now You're Gone" | The Supremes |
| March 11 | "Ruby Tuesday" | The Rolling Stones |
| March 18 | "Penny Lane" | The Beatles |
| March 25 | "Penny Lane" | The Beatles |
| April 1 | "Happy Together" | The Turtles |
| April 8 | "Happy Together" | The Turtles |
| April 15 | "Somethin' Stupid" | Nancy Sinatra & Frank Sinatra |
| April 22 | "A Little Bit Me, A Little Bit You" | The Monkees |
| April 29 | "A Little Bit Me, A Little Bit You" | The Monkees |
| May 6 | "Somethin' Stupid" | Nancy Sinatra & Frank Sinatra |
| May 13 | "The Happening" | The Supremes |
| May 20 | "Groovin'" | The Young Rascals |
| May 27 | "Groovin'" | The Young Rascals |
| June 3 | "I Got Rhythm" | The Happenings |
| June 10 | "Respect" | Aretha Franklin |
| June 17 | "Respect" | Aretha Franklin |
| June 24 | "Groovin'" | The Young Rascals |
| July 1 | "Windy" | The Association |
| July 8 | "Windy" | The Association |
| July 15 | "Can't Take My Eyes Off You" | Frankie Valli |
| July 22 | "Windy" | The Association |
| July 29 | "Can't Take My Eyes Off You" | Frankie Valli |
| August 5 | "Light My Fire" | The Doors |
| August 12 | "All You Need Is Love" | The Beatles |
| August 19 | "All You Need Is Love" | The Beatles |
| August 26 | "Ode to Billie Joe" | Bobbie Gentry |
| September 2 | "Ode to Billie Joe" | Bobbie Gentry |
| September 9 | "Ode to Billie Joe" | Bobbie Gentry |
| September 16 | "Ode to Billie Joe" | Bobbie Gentry |
| September 23 | "The Letter" | The Box Tops |
| September 30 | "The Letter" | The Box Tops |
| October 7 | "The Letter" | The Box Tops |
| October 14 | "Never My Love" | The Association |
| October 21 | "To Sir, With Love" | Lulu |
| October 28 | "To Sir, With Love" | Lulu |
| November 4 | "To Sir, With Love" | Lulu |
| November 11 | "Soul Man" | Sam & Dave |
| November 18 | "Incense and Peppermints" | Strawberry Alarm Clock |
| November 25 | "The Rain, The Park and Other Things" | The Cowsills |
| December 2 | "Daydream Believer" | The Monkees |
| December 9 | "Daydream Believer" | The Monkees |
| December 16 | "Daydream Believer" | The Monkees |
| December 23 | "Daydream Believer" | The Monkees |
| December 30 | "Hello, Goodbye" | The Beatles |

== See also ==
- 1967 in music
- List of Billboard Hot 100 number ones of 1967
