= Keep the Ball Rollin' =

"Keep The Ball Rollin'"

Single by Jay & the Techniques
- B-side: "Here We Go Again"
- Released: October 1967
- Genre: Pop-soul
- Length: 3:04
- Label: Smash
- Songwriters: Denny Randell, Sandy Linzer
- Producer: Jerry Ross

Jay & the Techniques singles chronology
"Apples, Peaches, Pumpkin Pie" (1967)	"Keep The Ball Rollin'" (1967)	"Strawberry Shortcake" (1968)

"Keep The Ball Rollin'" is a song written by Denny Randell and Sandy Linzer. It was recorded by Jay & the Techniques.

== Chart performance ==
"Keep The Ball Rollin" reached No. 14 on the Billboard Hot 100 in 1967.

== Other recordings ==
- Al Hirt released a version in January 1968. It reached No. 100 on the Billboard Hot 100 and No. 10 on the Easy Listening chart.
