= Andra decennier =

Studio album by Björn Skifs
- Released: 22 November 2006
- Recorded: Polar Studios/Kingside, Stockholm, Sweden
- Genre: schlager
- Length: 45 minutes
- Label: EMI Music Sweden
- Producer: Bengt Palmers, Hans Gardemar

Björn Skifs chronology
Decennier (2005)	Andra decennier (2006)	i2i / Eye to Eye (2007)

Andra decennier is a Björn Skifs studio album, consisting of covers of old songs. The album was released on 22 November 2006.

== Track listing ==
1. Södermalm
2. Säg det i toner
3. Alla har vi varit små
4. Säg hur har du det med kärleken idag
5. Räkna de lyckliga stunderna blott
6. Alla säger att jag ser så ledsen ut
7. Violen från Flen
8. Allt detta och himlen därtill
9. På en liten smutsig bakgård
10. Solen lyser även på liten stuga
11. Sång om syrsor
12. En liten smula kärlek

== Contributors ==
- Björn Skifs - vocals
- Peter Milefors - drums, percussion
- Bosse Persson - bass
- Magnus Bengtsson - harp
- Bengt Palmers - producer
- Hans Gardemar - grand piano, percussion, keyboard, producer
- Stockholm Session Strings - musicians

== Charts ==
=== Weekly charts ===
Chart (2006)	Peak position
Swedish Albums (Sverigetopplistan)	1

=== Year-end charts ===
Chart (2006)	Position
Swedish Albums (Sverigetopplistan)	4
