= Fool for Love (1985 film) =

1985 American drama film by Robert Altman

- Theatrical release poster
- Directed by: Robert Altman
- Screenplay by: Sam Shepard
- Based on: Fool for Love by Sam Shepard
- Produced by: Menahem Golan; Yoram Globus
- Starring: Sam Shepard; Kim Basinger; Randy Quaid; Harry Dean Stanton
- Cinematography: Pierre Mignot
- Edited by: Luce Grunenwaldt; Steve Dunn
- Music by: George Burt
- Production companies: Cinema '84; The Cannon Group, Inc.
- Distributed by: The Cannon Group, Inc.
- Release date: December 6, 1985
- Running time: 106 minutes
- Country: United States
- Language: English
- Budget: $2 million
- Box office: $836,000—$900,000

Fool for Love is a 1985 American psychological drama film directed by Robert Altman, and starring Sam Shepard, Kim Basinger, Harry Dean Stanton, Randy Quaid, and Martha Crawford. It follows a woman awaiting the arrival of her boyfriend in a derelict motel in the Mojave Desert, where she is confronted by a previous lover who threatens to undermine her efforts. It is based on the 1983 stage play written by Shepard, who also adapted the screenplay.

Altman pitched the idea of a film version of the original play to Shepard, who thereby adapted it for the screen. Shepard, who initially had no plan on appearing in the film, agreed to portray one of the lead roles at Altman's request. Filming took place in the spring of 1985 in Santa Fe and Las Vegas, New Mexico, after which Altman oversaw post-production in Paris.

Fool for Love was entered into the 1986 Cannes Film Festival before it received a limited theatrical release in the United States through The Cannon Group, Inc. on December 6, 1985. The film was a box-office flop but received positive reviews from critics.

== Plot ==
May is hiding out at a rundown motel in the Mojave Desert when an old flame and childhood friend, Eddie, a rodeo stunt rider, shows up unexpectedly from Wyoming. Eddie breaks into May's room and attempts to convince her in argumentative terms that their fates are somehow linked and that they should be together. May vehemently refuses him for a variety of reasons, one being his infidelity with a fashion model known only as the Countess. May says that she has no interest in living with Eddie under any circumstances, assuring Eddie that if she goes back to him their relationship will repeat the same destructive cycle it has followed before. May informs Eddie that her current boyfriend, Martin, is due to arrive that night for a date.

As May and Eddie squabble and goad each other, the motel proprietor, known as the Old Man, observes them. The Old Man offers commentary and anecdotes to May and Eddie, divulging his relationship with both. It is slowly revealed that May and Eddie are in fact biological half-siblings, each fathered by the Old Man who had led a double life, abandoning their respective families in the same town for different periods during each child's life. Without knowledge of their father's philandering, May and Eddie became lovers in high school and when their parents finally figured out what had occurred, Eddie's mother shot herself out of guilt and shame. May has grown to fear that Eddie has begun to emulate his father's feckless womanizing.

Eddie performs rodeo tricks with a lasso in the motel restaurant, while May looks on, drinking whiskey. The Countess arrives at the motel in a black Mercedes and opens fire at the restaurant with a revolver, apparently trying to shoot Eddie for his misconduct and mistreatment of her in their affair, before speeding away. As Eddie picks up a raging May and carries her back to her room, the Old Man remarks that he does not recognize himself in either of them. Martin arrives in the midst of the fight and tackles Eddie. May calms the situation, claiming that Eddie is her cousin, and that the two were in the midst of a trivial argument.

In the restaurant, Martin listens to each individual's recounting of events in bewilderment: Eddie confesses to Martin that May is his sister, and that the two fell in love before realizing they were related. May, however, claims they are not siblings, and that this is a fantasy Eddie has created. Meanwhile, the Old Man challenges May's story about Eddie's mother's suicide, claiming he was unaware of her death. The Old Man urges Eddie to come to his defense, but Eddie admits that his mother in fact killed herself with the Old Man's shotgun in a fit of despair. The Old Man accuses Eddie of betraying him as Eddie and May embrace.

The Countess returns to the motel and again opens fire. A stray bullet from her revolver sets off an explosion which ignites the entire motel into a blaze of fire. Eddie flees on horseback after the Countess as she drives away, while May departs on foot in the opposite direction with her suitcase in hand, leaving Martin behind. The Old Man closes himself inside his ramshackle trailer as the entire property is consumed by flames.

== Cast ==
- Sam Shepard as Eddie
  - Jonathan Skinner as Teenage Eddie
- Kim Basinger as May
  - Sura Cox as Teenage May
  - April Russell as Young May
- Harry Dean Stanton as Old Man
- Randy Quaid as Martin
- Martha Crawford as May's Mother
- Louise Egolf as Eddie's Mother
- Deborah McNaughton as The Countess
- Lon Hill as Mr. Valdes

== Production ==
=== Development ===
The film was adapted from Sam Shepard's stage play of the same name, which director Robert Altman expressed interest in. Shepard later stated that he felt the play was unsuited for a film adaptation, commenting:

What didn't work? The physicality of it. Onstage it was huge. It had a frightening physical reality to it, because of the actors, because of the intensity and the presence of the actors. On film it comes across as kind of a quaint little Western tale of two people lost in a motel room. Know what I mean? It doesn't have the power. In the theater it was right in front of your face, it was so intense and it was kind of scary.

=== Casting ===
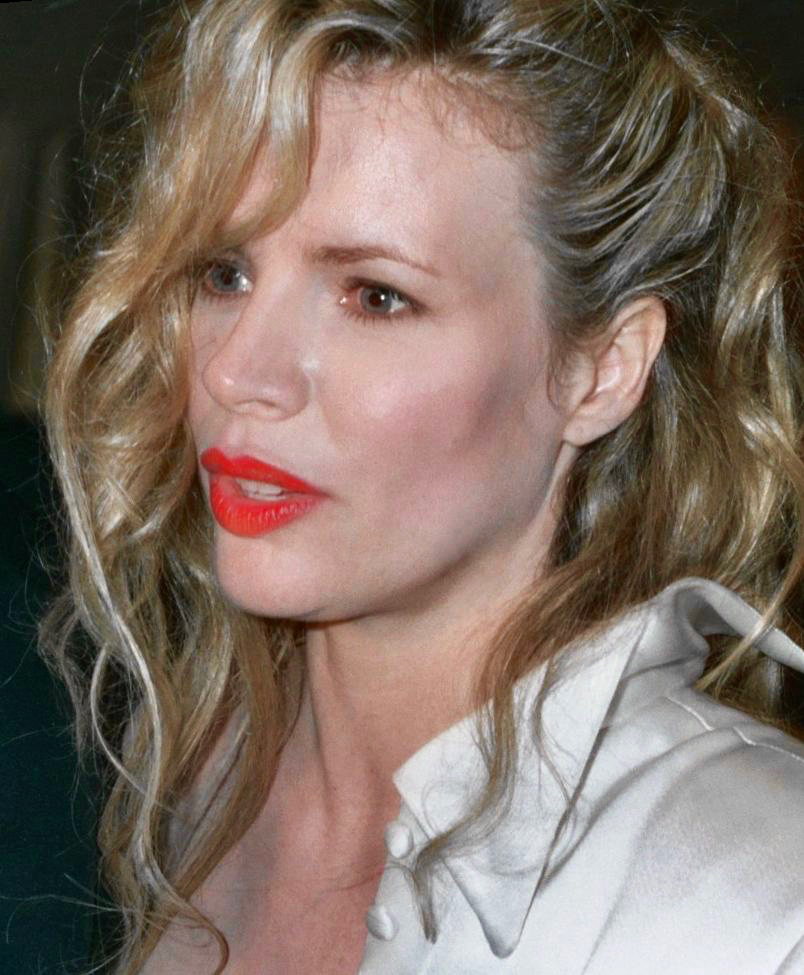
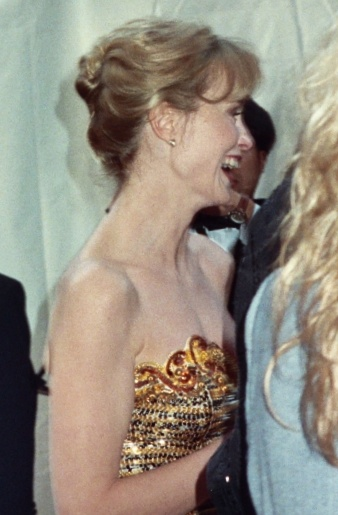
Kim Basinger (left) was cast in the film after Jessica Lange (right) dropped out upon learning she was pregnant.

Shepard's longtime partner Jessica Lange was originally asked to star in the film as May, but she backed out shortly before filming commenced, after which Kim Basinger was cast. Basinger later said that Lange, who was pregnant at the time, was "just too tired to do it. Otherwise I don't think I would've stood a chance. But after I met Sam, I didn't even have to read for the part. He just told me I had it."

Shepard wanted Ed Harris, who portrayed Eddie in the original stage production, to reprise the role, but director Robert Altman felt Shepard himself should play the role instead. Shepard later expressed remorse for starring in the film, stating that he felt "too attached to the material. I didn't have enough distance from it... I still think it was a mistake on my part. Ed was better. He had a more clean attack on the character than I did."

=== Filming ===
Altman originally intended for a $5–6 million budget, though the final production budget amounted to approximately $2 million. The film was shot on location in Santa Fe and Las Vegas, New Mexico, with principal photography beginning on May 13, 1985. Altman chose to shoot the film in the Santa Fe area so that Shepard, who resided there, could go home each night after filming. Filming lasted approximately eight weeks, with a daily shooting schedule spanning 9:00pm–6:00am, as the film takes place over the course of a single night.

The motel in which the film is set was constructed over a six-week period, designed by Altman and production designer Steve Altman (his son), and based on real operating motels they photographed while traveling through Albuquerque. The motel set was so convincing that tourists and passersby believed it to be a real operating motel. After production wrapped, the set was dismantled and removed.

Karen Evans, a journalist who visited the set and interviewed cast and crew members, described the shoot as "grueling," noting that Shepard often lost patience with the cast and crew members, including becoming angry with Basinger when she forgot lines.

=== Post-production ===
Altman completed post-production of the film in Paris, where he was shooting a television adaptation of Marsha Norman's play The Laundromat, starring Carol Burnett and Amy Madigan. Shepard stated in an interview years after the film's release that he had planned to partake in the post-production process, but that Altman took the film to France where he performed most of the editing himself.

== Music ==
=== Soundtrack ===
The soundtrack contains eight songs written and performed by Sandy Rogers, who is Sam Shepard's sister: “Let's Ride”, “It Comes and Goes”, “Go Rosa”, “You Lied Your Way”, “Call Me Up”, “Love Shy”, “First & Last Real Cowboy”, and “Why Wyoming” (co-written with Louise Kirchen).

Rogers also wrote a song called “Fool for Love” for the movie, but it was declined by Altman. The song was featured in the film Reservoir Dogs and on its soundtrack album, and later also on Rogers's own album Green Moon (1997).

== Release ==
=== Home media ===
MGM/UA Home Video released Fool for Love on VHS in 1986. MGM Home Entertainment released the film for the first time on DVD on April 20, 2004.

Kino Lorber released a Blu-ray edition in conjunction with Scorpion Releasing on June 8, 2021.

== Reception ==
=== Box office ===
Following its premiere at the 1986 Cannes Film Festival, Fool for Love had a limited theatrical release in New York City and Los Angeles on December 6, 1985, grossing $55,637 during its opening weekend. It went on to gross approximately $900,000 worldwide, and was considered a box-office flop.

=== Critical response ===
Fool for Love was met with largely unfavorable reviews from film critics. Journalist Jay Carr of The Boston Globe wrote at the time of its release that it was "taking a bit of a critical beating because it's nothing like the play," but added that he felt the film version was "something quite different, and in some ways more interesting."

Roger Ebert gave the film three stars out of four and wrote, "With Fool for Love, [Altman] has succeeded on two levels that seem opposed to each other. He has made a melodrama, almost a soap opera, in which the characters achieve a kind of nobility." Gene Siskel also gave the film three out of four stars, writing that Altman "has served the play well." Sheila Benson of the Los Angeles Times stated, "As played by Shepard himself and a ferociously wonderful Kim Basinger, it's a raw, explosively funny, elemental tragicomedy about the pure willfulness of love." Lawrence O'Toole of Maclean's wrote that "the performances of Shepard and Basinger are often mannered and too emotionally confined for all the noisy fighting that takes place. Despite those flaws, Fool for Love is sizzlingly effective. What emerges is a portrait of two lives that are painfully, inexorably, even tragically united." Derek Malcolm of The Guardian praised the film's performances, describing them as "the best part of this otherwise still slightly theatrical adaptation," remarking that Basinger is "a whole class better" than in 9½ Weeks (1986), and concluding that the film is "about twice as gripping as your average American movie."

Vincent Canby of The New York Times had an ambivalent assessment of the film, writing that it "has several exceptional things going for it, namely the performances by Mr. Shepard as Eddie, Kim Basinger as May and Harry Dean Stanton as The Old Man." His main criticism was finding Altman's close-ups and cross-cutting too frequent: "You don't have to know and admire Mr. Shepard's text to want to shout out to the director to pull the camera back and sit still." A negative review in Variety wrote that the film made the material "look like specious stuff filled with dramatic ideas left over from the 1950s. Some highbrow critics here and abroad likely will proclaim this a masterpiece, but general audiences will react as they did to the last Shepard-scripted pic, Paris, Texas—with a yawn." Victoria Mather of The Daily Telegraph similarly criticized the film's screenplay, writing: "Sam Shepard is an anarchic writer. He ridicules the traditional American values of the ordered life on the homestead... Basinger has descended with careless ease... to the flaky nylon trappings of Fool for Love. At the end of the film she walks off down the road to nowhere carrying a suitcase. One is left wondering what all the shouting has been about, except a terror of understatement. Nothing has been achieved."

As of February 2023, the film holds an approval score of 79% on the review aggregator Rotten Tomatoes, based on 14 reviews, with an average rating of 5.70/10.

== Sources ==
- Evans, Karen (October 1, 1985). "Celluloid Illusions". Albuquerque Journal. pp. 4–10 – via Newspapers.com.
- McGilligan, Patrick (1989). Robert Altman: Jumping Off the Cliff. New York City, New York: Macmillan. ISBN 978-0-312-30467-6.
- Steritt, David, ed. (2000). Robert Altman: Interviews. Jackson, Mississippi: Univ. Press of Mississippi. ISBN 978-1-578-06186-0.
- Yule, Andrew (1987). Hollywood a Go-Go: The True Story of the Cannon Film Empire. London, England: Sphere Books. ISBN 978-0-722-19389-1.
- Zuckoff, Mitchell (2010). Robert Altman: The Oral Biography. New York City, New York: Doubleday. ISBN 978-0-307-38791-2.
