= List of Mercury Records artists =

== 0-9 ==
- 10cc
- 4 Hero

== A ==
- ABC
- AJR
- Paula Abdul
- Oleta Adams
- Lauren Alaina
- Daniele Alexander
- Alisha's Attic
- All About Eve
- Graeme Allwright
- Alsou
- American Authors
- Albert Ammons
- Tori Amos
- Anastacia
- Cat Anderson
- Ernestine Anderson
- Animal Bag
- Animotion
- Aphrodite's Child
- Aqua
- Jan August
- Sil Austin
- Zoë Avril
- Steve Azar
- Iggy Azalea
- Charles Aznavour

== B ==
- Babyface
- Bachman–Turner Overdrive
- Ross Bagdasarian
- Butch Baker
- Josephine Baker
- The Bama Band
- Buju Banton
- The Bar-Kays
- Bryant Barnes
- Count Basie
- Axel Bauer
- Bee Gees
- Justin Bieber
- Robin Beck
- Brook Benton
- Chuck Berry
- The Big Bopper
- Big Country
- Bill Kenny aka Ink Spots
- Biohazard
- Black Sheep
- Blahzay Blahzay
- Blood Red Shoes
- Kurtis Blow
- Blue Ash
- Blue Pearl
- Blues Magoos
- The Bluetones
- Bon Jovi/Jon Bon Jovi
- Ronnie Bond
- Daniel Boone
- Larry Boone
- David Bowie
- Boy Kill Boy
- The Brains
- Bo Bruce
- Lindsey Buckingham
- Jake Bugg
- Laura Bell Bundy
- The Burch Sisters
- Bo Burnham
- George Burns
- Kristian Bush
- Jerry Butler
- Jerry Byrd
- BoyWithUke

== C ==
- Steve Clark
- Ryan Cabrera
- J. J. Cale
- Calogero
- Caligula
- Cameo
- Candy
- Jenny Lou Carson
- Captain Beefheart
- The Cardigans
- Rodney Carrington
- David Carroll
- Anita Carter
- Johnny Cash
- Gene Chandler
- Louis Chedid
- Christophe
- Chuck D
- Central Line
- Cinderella
- Circle Jerks
- City Boy
- Terri Clark
- Coldwater Jane
- Lloyd Cole
- Al Corley
- Company of Wolves
- Con Funk Shun
- Julian Cope
- Easton Corbin
- Corbin/Hanner
- Neal Coty
- Coven
- Billy "Crash" Craddock
- Harrison Craig
- Cream
- The Creation
- Taio Cruz
- Xavier Cugat
- The Crew-Cuts
- Billy Currington
- Billy Ray Cyrus

== D ==
- The Damned Things
- Vic Damone
- Darius Danesh
- Davis Daniel
- Billy Daniels
- The Danleers
- Daniel Darc
- D'banj
- Jimmy Dean
- Mike Deasy
- Deep Purple
- Def Leppard
- The Del Vikings
- Denada
- Wesley Dennis
- Dewi Sandra
- Dexys Midnight Runners
- Manu Dibango
- The Diamonds
- Diamond D
- Dio
- DJ Chuck Chillout
- Dot Rotten
- Fats Domino
- Lonnie Donegan
- Antal Doráti
- downset.
- Dragonette
- Rusty Draper
- Drippin (Mercury Tokyo)
- Duffy
- Dash and Will
- Dream

== E ==
- Billy Eckstine
- Ed O.G. & da Bulldogs
- Joel Edwards
- Meredith Edwards
- Electribe 101
- Elodie Frégé
- Elsa Lunghini
- Emcee N.I.C.E.
- The Everly Brothers
- The Envy Corps
- Era
- Coke Escovedo
- Maggie Estep
- Sara Evans
- Leon Everette
- Example
- Exuma

== F ==
- Face to Face
- Faith Band
- Fall Out Boy
- Christine Fan
- Donna Fargo
- Frederick Fennell
- Earlston Ford
- Fighting Gravity
- Fine Young Cannibals
- Finger Eleven
- Tony Fontane
- The Four Aces
- Elodie Frégé
- Futures

== G ==
- Peter Gabriel
- Serge Gainsbourg
- Gap Band (via Total Experience Productions)
- The Gaslight Anthem
- Ronnie Gaylord
- The Gaylords
- Bob Geldof
- Georgia Gibbs
- Giggs
- Kendji Girac
- Girlschool
- Go 101
- God Street Wine
- Golden Child (Mercury Tokyo)
- Goldspot
- Selena Gomez
- Delta Goodrem
- Lesley Gore
- Gorky Park
- Gotye
- Grace
- Ariana Grande
- Pat Green
- Green on Red
- Greta
- Tito Guizar

== H ==
- Steve Hackett
- Halfway to Hazard
- Tom T. Hall
- Johnny Hallyday
- Herbie Hancock
- Hanson
- Howard Hanson
- Darren Hayes
- Lee Hazlewood
- Roy Head
- Eric Heatherly
- Paul Heaton
- The Herd
- Earl Hines
- HiVi!
- Stevie Hoang
- Hole
- Julianne Hough
- Mr. Hudson
- Homicide
- Honeyz

== I ==
- Icona Pop
- Iglu & Hartly
- Ill Al Skratch
- I Mother Earth
- Incognito
- INXS* (in Europe and Latin America only)
- IQ

== J ==
- Jakwob
- Jamiroquai
- James
- Jessie James
- Luke James
- Rick James
- Jay & the Techniques
- Jeff Knight
- Herb Jeffries
- Jenifer
- Calvin Jeremy (Universal/Mercury Malaysia)
- Jerky Boys
- Elton John (except US)
- Buddy Johnson
- Jamey Johnson
- JoJo
- Nick Jonas
- George Jones
- David Jordan
- Louis Jordan
- Junior
- Jagwar Twin (joint with Big Loud Rock & Republic Records)

== K ==
- The Kendalls
- The Kentucky Headhunters
- Sammy Kershaw
- Keith
- Toby Keith
- The Killers
- Morgana King
- Kiss
- Kiss in the Dark (K.I.D.)
- Jeff Knight
- Mark Knopfler (except US)
- Kool & The Gang
- Kris Kristofferson
- KARRAHBOOO
- Krokus
- Kubb
- Rafael Kubelík
- Kate Ceberano
- Kylie Minogue

== L ==
- Jennifer Lopez
- Pixie Lott
- Frankie Laine
- Lamb
- The Last Poets
- Marc Lavoine
- Tracy Lawrence
- Eddie Layton
- Jena Lee
- Legendary Stardust Cowboy
- Grégory Lemarchal
- Nolwenn Leroy
- Jerry Lee Lewis
- Ramsey Lewis
- Lighter Shade of Brown
- Lindisfarne
- Lisa de'Blonk
- Little Big Town
- Little Richard
- LeAnn Rimes
- Cher Lloyd
- Loona (Mercury Tokyo)
- Zane Lowe
- Laura Love
- Love Unlimited
- Love Unlimited Orchestra
- Lulu

== M ==
- Cledus Maggard
- Zayn Malik
- Miriam Makeba
- Chuck Mangione
- Post Malone
- Mann
- Ray Manzarek
- Marcel
- Ida Maria
- Marilyn
- The Marshall Tucker Band
- The Mauds
- Maxee
- Melissa Tkautz
- Metallica (Vertigo/Mercury)
- Tony Martin
- Brent Mason
- Carmen Mastren
- Ralph Marterie
- Johnny Mathis (1962–66)
- Seiko Matsuda
- Kathy Mattea
- Max Webster (Outside of Canada)
- Paul McCartney
- Charly McClain
- Brian McComas
- The McCoys
- Scotty McCreery
- Reba McEntire
- Rollee McGill
- Brian McKnight
- Clyde McPhatter
- Glen Medeiros
- John Mellencamp
- Men Without Hats
- The Mighty Mighty Bosstones
- Milburn
- Buddy Miles
- Chuck Miller
- Roger Miller
- Steve Miller
- Shane Minor
- Chad Mitchell Trio
- The Mission UK
- The Modern
- The Modernaires
- Mona
- Agnes Monica
- Mono
- Monsta X (Mercury Tokyo)
- Randy Montana
- Melba Moore
- Matthew Morrison
- Van Morrison
- Dick Morrissey
- Buddy Morrow
- Monsoon
- Nana Mouskouri
- Mother Earth
- Moxy
- My Darkest Days
- Elio Mei
- Jo Dee Messina

== N ==
- David Nail
- Naked Lunch
- Nashville Pussy
- Neon Trees
- Nero
- Jennifer Nettles
- Ne-Yo
- New Colony Six
- New York Dolls
- Alfred Newman
- Gary Nichols
- The Nice
- Nine Inch Nails (American/monarC/Brushfire/MLD Entertainment/Mercury)
- Nine Vicious
- Noel Gallagher's High Flying Birds
- Noisettes
- Novelist
- NRBQ

== O ==
- Yūji Oda
- Ohio Players
- Mike Oldfield
- Jamie O'Neal
- One Block Radius
- The Orb
- Roy Orbison (1976)
- Orson
- Joan Osborne
- James Otto
- One Night Only
- Mark Owen

== P ==
- The Paddingtons
- Jimmy Page & Robert Plant
- Patti Page
- Tiffany Page
- Mikill Pane
- Florent Pagny
- Paper Lace
- Parachute
- Graham Parker
- Parliament
- Parlet
- Paul Paray
- Dolly Parton
- Pat Paulsen
- Johnny Paycheck
- Pere Ubu
- Carl Perkins
- Katy Perry
- Oscar Peterson
- Phil Phillips
- Pixies Three
- Plan B
- Robert Plant
- The Platters
- Portishead
- Robert Post
- Propaganda
- Johnny Preston
- Jeanne Pruett
- Red Prysock
- Pure Love
- Rafael Puyana
- The Penguins

== R ==
- The Radiators
- Rainbow Butt Monkeys
- Raisa
- RAN
- Randy Rogers Band
- Kenny Rankin
- The Rapture
- Razorlight
- Rebecca
- Redd Kross
- Dan Reed Network
- The Reels
- The Refreshments
- Burt Reynolds
- Reza Artamevia
- J.P. Richardson
- LeAnn Rimes
- Lionel Richie
- Rihanna
- The Robbs
- Julie Roberts
- Rocket Riot
- Johnny Rodriguez
- Tommy Roe
- Julie Rogers
- Rossa
- Dot Rotten
- Demis Roussos
- Pete Rugolo
- The Runaways
- Rush
- Rusted Root

== S ==
- Sa-Fire
- Maverick Sabre
- Richie Sambora
- Sandy & Junior
- Sania
- Juelz Santana
- Aggro Santos
- The Saturdays
- Savage Resurrection
- Scenario
- Scorpions (US/Canada)
- Lisa Scott-Lee
- Marvin Sease
- Stevie Hoang
- Sergeant
- The Shangri-Las
- L. Shankar
- Sherina Munaf
- Michelle Shocked
- Vicky Shu
- Beau Sia
- Lucie Silvas
- Sinbad
- Sir Lord Baltimore
- Sir Douglas Quintet
- Roni Size
- Skint & Demoralised
- Smile
- Anthony Smith
- The Smothers Brothers
- Son of Dork
- Jo-El Sonnier
- Soraya
- Takashi Sorimachi
- Southside Johnny & the Asbury Jukes
- Muggsy Spanier
- Spandau Ballet
- Spanky & Our Gang
- Sparky's Flaw
- Special Needs
- Spirit
- Rick Springfield
- The Stanley Brothers
- Status Quo
- Ringo Starr
- The Statler Brothers
- STAYC (Mercury Tokyo)
- Keith Stegall
- Stephen Sanchez
- Stereophonics
- Ray Stevens
- Rod Stewart
- Streetwalkers
- The Strypes
- Sugarland
- Sum 41 (Island outside Canada)
- Donna Summer
- Gene Summers
- Taylor Swift
- Swing Out Sister

== T ==
- The Teardrop Explodes
- Tears for Fears
- Teen Queens
- Texas
- Thin Lizzy
- Thirteen Senses
- Thrice
- Tiddas
- Tim & Jean
- Tim Rollinson
- Titi DJ
- Melissa Tkautz
- Pete Tong
- Tony! Toni! Toné!
- Trio
- Treponem Pal
- The Troggs
- Trueblood
- Shania Twain
- Conway Twitty

== U ==
- U2
- Ugly Kid Joe
- Uriah Heep
- The Urgency
- Utada

== V ==
- Bobby Valentino
- The Vamps
- Van der Graaf Generator
- Sarah Vaughan
- The Vels
- Regine Velasquez
- Louise Verneuil

== W ==
- Hannes Wader
- The Wanted
- Clifford T. Ward
- Jacky Ward
- Dinah Washington
- Megan Washington
- Crystal Waters
- Ethel Waters
- Roger Waters
- The Webb Sisters
- Ted Weems
- The Welcome Mat
- Lawrence Welk
- John West
- Kanye West
- Tim Westwood
- Wet Wet Wet
- Barry White
- Josh White
- Vanessa White
- John & Audrey Wiggins
- Lucinda Williams
- Vanessa Williams
- Mark Wills
- Matt Willis
- Patrick Wolf
- Lee Ann Womack
- Wonderland
- The Wrays
- Chely Wright
- Wright Brothers Band

== Y ==
- Yaggfu Front
- Yarbrough and Peoples (via Total Experience Productions)
- Young Jeezy
- Jesse Colin Young
- Yuck
- Timi Yuro

== Z ==
- Frank Zappa
- Zazie
- Zerra 1
- Zack Tabudlo

== See also ==
- Mercury Records
- The Island Def Jam Music Group
- Universal Music Group
