= Michelangelo (song) =

1975 song popularized by Björn Skifs

Single by Björn Skifs
- A-side: "Michelangelo"
- B-side: "Snälla stanna här"
- Released: 1975
- Genre: Rock; Schlager
- Length: 3:16
- Label: EMI
- Songwriter(s): Bengt Palmers; Björn Skifs

Björn Skifs singles chronology
"Hush" / "I'm Alive" (1975)	"Michelangelo" (1975)	"Vi bygger oss en båt" (1976)

"Michelangelo", written by Bengt Palmers and Björn Skifs, is a Swedish song performed by Björn Skifs, reaching fifth place in Melodifestivalen 1975, the Swedish qualification competition for the Eurovision Song Contest that year. The song is about trying to call Michelangelo Buonarroti to find out how he created his works of art.

The song was released by Skifs on the single-disc EMI 4E 006–35180. Arranger and producer was Bengt Palmers. It was also on the LP Schiffz! (EMI 062–34990). In Sweden, the song held the number one spot on Svensktoppen for seven weeks, while it peaked at number seven on the VG-lista, the Norwegian Singles chart.
