= Decennier =

Studio album by Björn Skifs
- Released: 7 December 2005
- Recorded: Polar Studios/Kingside, Stockholm, Sweden
- Genre: schlager
- Length: 42 minutes
- Label: EMI Music Sweden
- Producer: Bengt Palmers, Hans Gardemar

Björn Skifs chronology
Ingen annan (2002)	Decennier (2005)	Andra decennier (2006)

Decennier is a studio album by Swedish singer Björn Skifs, released on 7 December 2005. It consists of recordings of old songs.

== Track listing ==
1. Underbart är kort
2. En stilla flirt
3. Med dig i mina armar
4. Utan dej
5. Nu tändas åter ljusen i min lilla stad
6. Havet, vinden och stjärnorna
7. En månskenspromenad
8. Följ mej bortåt vägen
9. Regntunga skyar
10. Den dagen visorna dör
11. Till dig
12. Nattens melodi

== Contributors ==
- Björn Skifs - vocals
- Peter Milefors - drums
- Bosse Persson - doubblebass
- Magnus Bengtsson - guitar
- Tina Ahlin - harmonica
- Hans Gardemar - grand piano, keyboard, accordion, percussion
- Bengt Palmers - producer
- Stockholm Session Strings - musicians

== Charts ==
Chart (2005–2006)	Peak position
Swedish Albums (Sverigetopplistan)	1
