= Hooked on a Feeling (Blue Swede album) =

Studio album by Blue Swede
- Released: 1974
- Genre: Rock
- Length: 37:53
- Label: EMI
- Producer: Bengt Palmers

Blue Swede chronology
Hooked on a Feeling (1974)	Out of the Blue (1993)

Professional ratings
Review scores
Source	Rating
Allmusic	4/5 stars

Hooked on a Feeling is an album by Swedish rock band Blue Swede released in 1974. They became internationally recognized largely due to their 'ooga chaka' cover of Jonathan King's 1971 version of the 1968 Mark James song "Hooked on a Feeling".

== Track listing ==
All tracks are written by Bengt Palmers and Björn Skifs, except where noted

No.	Title	Writer(s)	Length
1.	"Hooked on a Feeling"	Mark James	2:52
2.	"Pinewood Rally"		4:37
3.	"Silly Milly"	Harald Braschoss, Christian Bruhn, Hartmut Preiss	4:55
4.	"Lonely Sunday Afternoon"		2:28
5.	"Gotta Have Your Love"		4:44
6.	"Destiny"	José Feliciano	3:40
7.	"Something's Burning"	Mac Davis	2:16
8.	"Working in the Coal Mine"	Allen Toussaint	3:17
9.	"Never My Love"	Dick Addrisi, Don Addrisi	4:43
10.	"(There's) Always Something There to Remind Me"	Burt Bacharach, Hal David	3:31

== Personnel ==
Blue Swede

- Björn Skifs - lead vocals
- Michael Areklaw - guitars
- Bosse Liljedahl - bass
- Ladislav Balatz - electric piano, organ
- Hinke Ekestubbe - tenor saxophone, backing vocals, flute
- Tom Berger - trumpet, backing vocals, flugelhorn
- Jan Guldbäch - drums
