= List of Billboard Hot 100 number ones of 1967 =

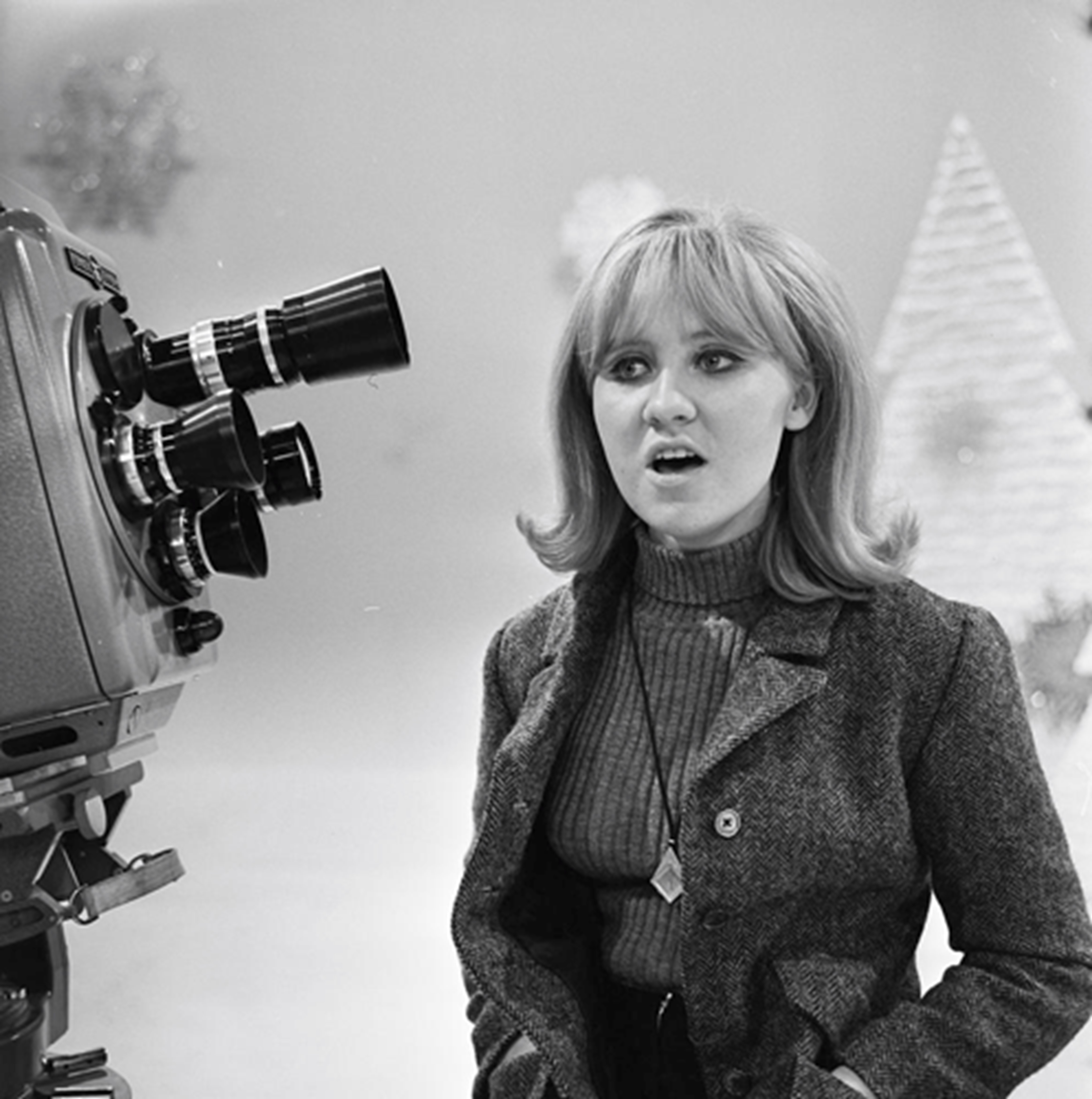
Lulu spent five weeks at number one with "To Sir with Love".

The Billboard Hot 100 is a chart published since August 1958 by Billboard magazine which ranks the best-performing singles in the United States. In 1967, it was compiled based on a combination of sales and airplay data sourced from surveys of retail outlets and playlists submitted by radio stations respectively, and 19 different singles spent time at number one.

On the chart dated January 7, the Monkees were at number one with "I'm a Believer", the song's second week in the top spot. It occupied the peak position for the first six weeks of 1967 for a final total of seven weeks at number one, the longest unbroken run atop the chart since 1964. The group returned to number one later in the year with "Daydream Believer" and their total of ten weeks in the top spot was the most achieved by any act in 1967. Their popularity began to decline the following year, however; the final episode of the television sitcom for which the group had been assembled aired in March 1968, after which they achieved no further top 10 entries. "I'm a Believer" was replaced at number one by "Kind of a Drag" by the Buckinghams, the first of eight acts that topped the Hot 100 for the first time in their careers in 1967. The Turtles had their first number one in March with "Happy Together"; both the Buckinghams and the Turtles achieved no further Hot 100 number ones.

In June, Aretha Franklin, known as the "Queen of Soul", gained the only solo Hot 100 number one of her career with "Respect". In 2024, Rolling Stone magazine placed the song at number one on the latest iteration of its list of the 500 greatest songs of all time. Although Franklin achieved a record-breaking 20 number ones on Billboard's R&B chart, her only other appearance in the top spot on the Hot 100 came twenty years later when she duetted with George Michael on the song "I Knew You Were Waiting (For Me)". Later in 1967, the Doors, Bobbie Gentry, the Box Tops, Lulu, and Strawberry Alarm Clock each achieved their first Hot 100 number one; of these, only the Doors achieved a second. Both the Doors' "Light My Fire" and Strawberry Alarm Clock's "Incense and Peppermints" are considered representative of the psychedelia movement which flourished in the late 1960s, particularly during the so-called Summer of Love of 1967. The Scottish singer Lulu's single "To Sir with Love", the title track from the film of the same name, was the biggest-selling single in the United States in 1967, and spent five weeks at number one, but did not chart at all in her native United Kingdom as it was not released as a single there. The year's final number one on the Hot 100 was "Hello, Goodbye" by the Beatles, which moved into the peak position on the chart dated December 30, making the British group the only act with three number ones during 1967. For the second consecutive year, the Beatles, the Monkees, and the Supremes were the only acts to have more than one song reach number one.

== Chart history ==
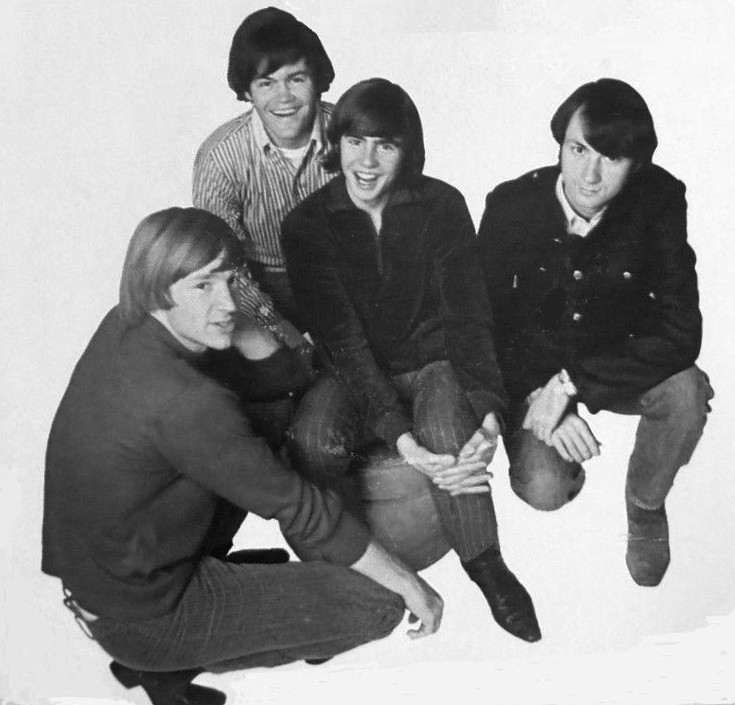
The Monkees reached number one twice in 1967 with "I'm a Believer" and "Daydream Believer".

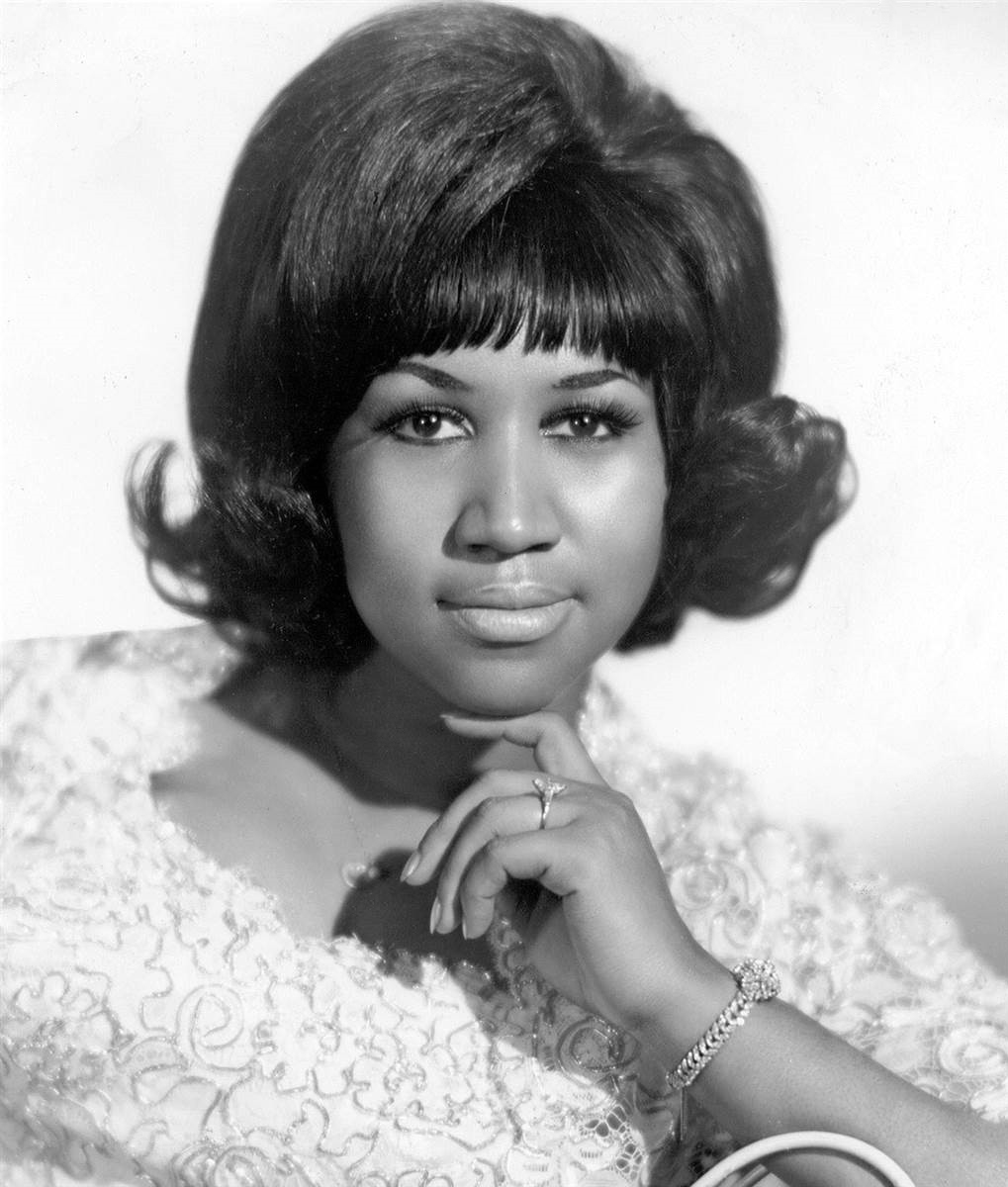
Aretha Franklin scored her first chart-topper with "Respect" in 1967.

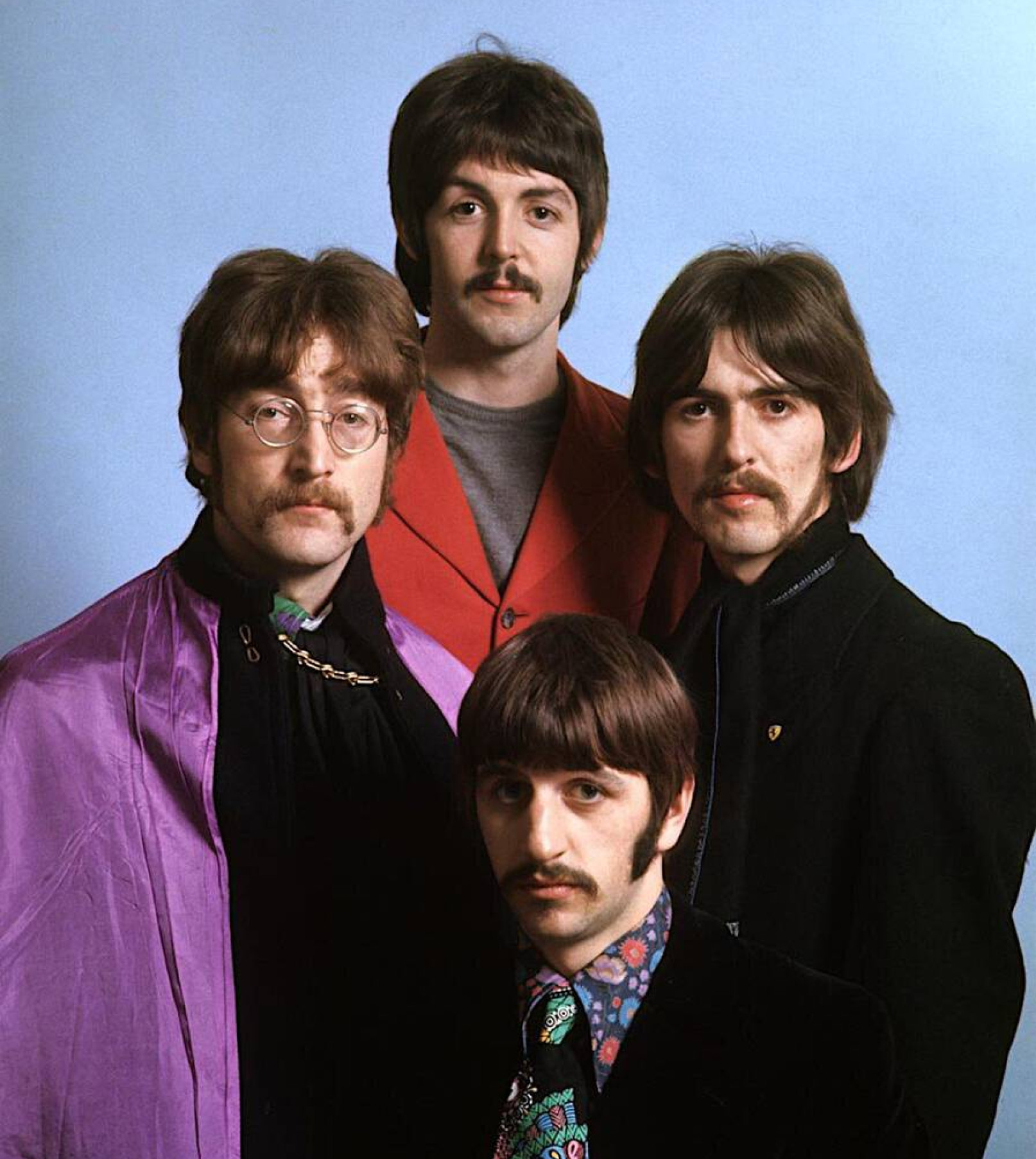
The Beatles were the only act with three number ones during the year.

Chart history
No. (Note: The "No." column indicates the numerical sequence of number ones in Hot 100 history. "Re" indicates a single returning to number one.)	Issue date	Title	Artist(s)	Ref.
177	January 7	"I'm a Believer"	The Monkees	
177	January 14	"I'm a Believer"	The Monkees	
177	January 21	"I'm a Believer"	The Monkees	
177	January 28	"I'm a Believer"	The Monkees	
177	February 4	"I'm a Believer"	The Monkees	
177	February 11	"I'm a Believer"	The Monkees	
178	February 18	"Kind of a Drag"	The Buckinghams	
178	February 25	"Kind of a Drag"	The Buckinghams	
179	March 4	"Ruby Tuesday"	The Rolling Stones	
180	March 11	"Love Is Here and Now You're Gone"	The Supremes	
181	March 18	"Penny Lane"	The Beatles	
182	March 25	"Happy Together"	The Turtles	
182	April 1	"Happy Together"	The Turtles	
182	April 8	"Happy Together"	The Turtles	
183	April 15	"Somethin' Stupid"	Nancy Sinatra and Frank Sinatra	
183	April 22	"Somethin' Stupid"	Nancy Sinatra and Frank Sinatra	
183	April 29	"Somethin' Stupid"	Nancy Sinatra and Frank Sinatra	
183	May 6	"Somethin' Stupid"	Nancy Sinatra and Frank Sinatra	
184	May 13	"The Happening"	The Supremes	
185	May 20	"Groovin'"	The Young Rascals	
185	May 27	"Groovin'"	The Young Rascals	
186	June 3	"Respect"	Aretha Franklin	
186	June 10	"Respect"	Aretha Franklin	
185 (re)	June 17	"Groovin'"	The Young Rascals	
185 (re)	June 24	"Groovin'"	The Young Rascals	
187	July 1	"Windy"	The Association	
187	July 8	"Windy"	The Association	
187	July 15	"Windy"	The Association	
187	July 22	"Windy"	The Association	
188	July 29	"Light My Fire"	The Doors	
188	August 5	"Light My Fire"	The Doors	
188	August 12	"Light My Fire"	The Doors	
189	August 19	"All You Need Is Love"	The Beatles	
190	August 26	"Ode to Billie Joe"	Bobbie Gentry	
190	September 2	"Ode to Billie Joe"	Bobbie Gentry	
190	September 9	"Ode to Billie Joe"	Bobbie Gentry	
190	September 16	"Ode to Billie Joe"	Bobbie Gentry	
191	September 23	"The Letter"	The Box Tops	
191	September 30	"The Letter"	The Box Tops	
191	October 7	"The Letter"	The Box Tops	
191	October 14	"The Letter"	The Box Tops	
192	October 21	"To Sir With Love"	Lulu	
192	October 28	"To Sir With Love"	Lulu	
192	November 4	"To Sir With Love"	Lulu	
192	November 11	"To Sir With Love"	Lulu	
192	November 18	"To Sir With Love"	Lulu	
193	November 25	"Incense and Peppermints"	Strawberry Alarm Clock	
194	December 2	"Daydream Believer"	The Monkees	
194	December 9	"Daydream Believer"	The Monkees	
194	December 16	"Daydream Believer"	The Monkees	
194	December 23	"Daydream Believer"	The Monkees	
195	December 30	"Hello, Goodbye"	The Beatles	

== Number-one artists ==
List of number-one artists by total weeks at number one
Weeks at No. 1	Artist
10	The Monkees
5	Lulu
4	Nancy Sinatra
4	Frank Sinatra
4	The Young Rascals
4	The Association
4	Bobbie Gentry
4	The Box Tops
3	The Turtles
3	The Doors
3	The Beatles
2	The Buckinghams
2	The Supremes
2	Aretha Franklin
1	The Rolling Stones
1	Strawberry Alarm Clock

== See also ==
- 1967 in music
- Cashbox Top 100 number-one singles of 1967
- List of Billboard number-one singles
- List of Billboard Hot 100 top-ten singles in 1967
- List of Billboard Hot 100 number-one singles from 1958 to 1969
