= Björn Skifs =

Swedish singer, songwriter, actor and screenwriter (born 1947)

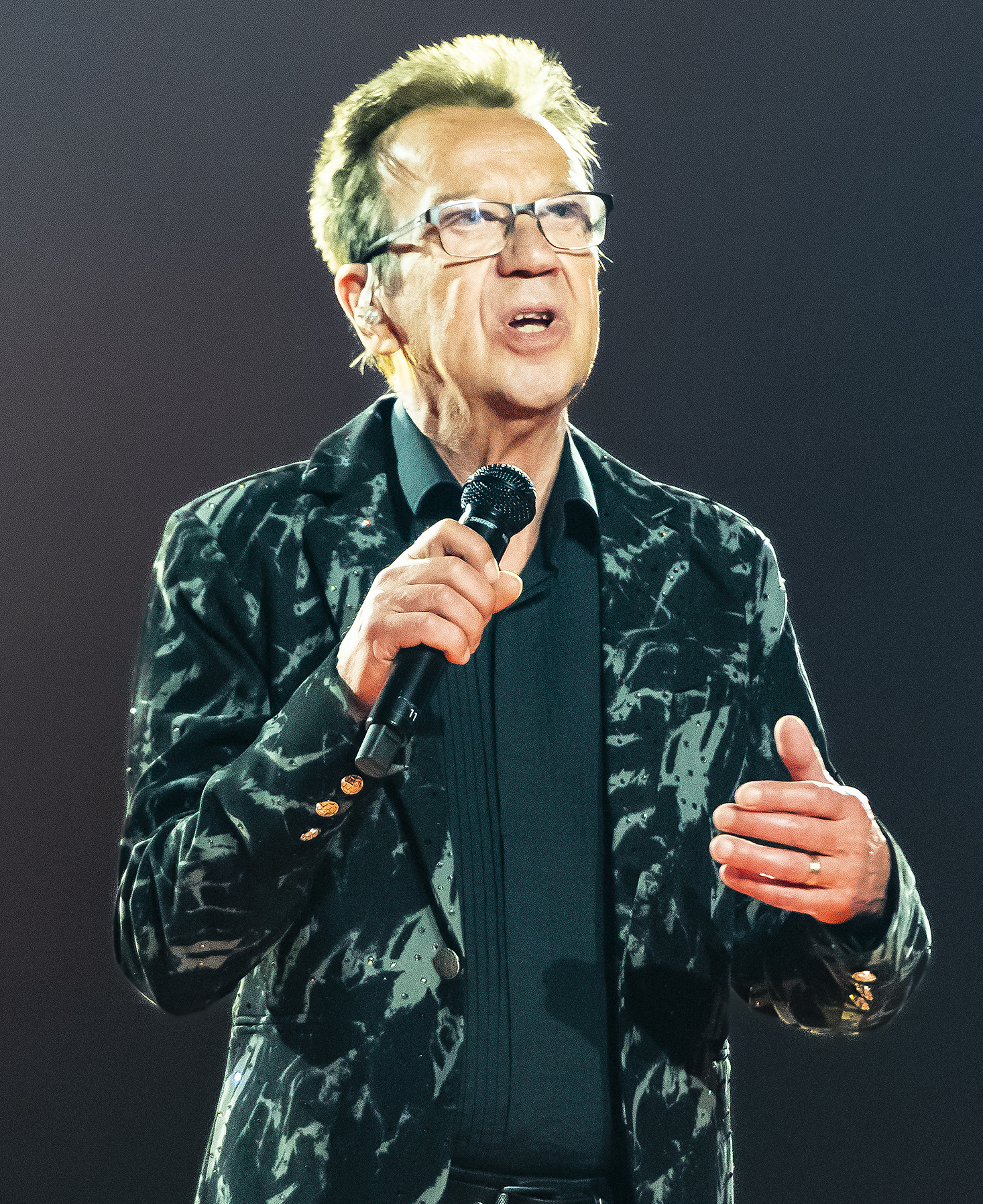
- Skifs in 2024
- Born: Björn Nils Olof Skifs; 20 April 1947 (age 79); Vansbro, Sweden
- Occupations: Singer; songwriter; musician; actor
- Years active: 1966–2025
- Spouse: Pernilla Hulting (m. 1988)
- Musical career
- Genres: Rock; pop; schlager
- Instruments: Vocals; guitar; keyboards
- Labels: Capitol; Columbia; EMI; Parlophone; Polydor
- Formerly of: Slam Creepers; Blue Swede

Björn Nils Olof Skifs (Swedish: [ˈbjœːɳ ˈɧɪfs]; born 20 April 1947) is a retired Swedish singer, songwriter, actor, and screenwriter. Skifs has represented Sweden twice in the Eurovision Song Contest, in the 1978 contest and in the 1981 contest.

== Career ==
Björn Skifs formed his first musical group, Slam Creepers, in 1962. Slam Creepers split in 1969 and Skifs went on to form a new band, Blåblus (a farmer's or workman's shirt (blus, blouse) made from blue (blå, blue) fabric - a pun (blues)) in 1972. As the lead singer of Blue Swede (another pun - blue + suede), the band had a No. 1 hit on Billboard Hot 100 in 1974 with a cover of Mark James's "Hooked on a Feeling".

Skifs embarked on a solo career after Slam Creepers broke up in 1969 and previously he had recorded the duet Med varann with Anni-Frid Lyngstad for his 1975 album Schiffz!. Skifs appeared as The Arbiter on the original studio album for Chess, released in 1984. A single and video, The Arbiter (I Know the Score), was released in 1985. Skifs also recorded several demos for the album, including One Night in Bangkok, later performed by Murray Head. Skifs did not perform the role on stage (in the original London production the character was played by Tom Jobe).

Povel Ramel gave Skifs the Karamelodiktstipendiet award in 1984.

Skifs has represented Sweden twice in the Eurovision Song Contest, in the 1978 contest and in the 1981 contest. In 2000, he hosted Melodifestivalen, the Swedish heat of the Eurovision Song Contest, along with nine other presenters.

In 2002, he scored a major hit with the song "Håll mitt hjärta" (Hold My Heart), which is a Swedish version of Peter Hallström's song Same Ol' Story. It stayed on Svensktoppen from 27 April 2003 until 8 January 2006, for a total of 142 weeks. In April 2020, Skifs performed at the Swedish live-show En kväll tillsammans, broadcast on SVT, which aimed to bring in money to the Swedish COVID-19 risk groups. Skifs performed the song "Håll Mitt Hjärta" at the end of the show.

Skifs was the opening act of the final of the Eurovision Song Contest 2024 on 11 May, performing "Hooked on a Feeling".

On 17 July 2025, Skifs announced that he was ending his music career because he had been diagnosed with frontotemporal dementia.

== Discography ==
=== Albums ===
| Title | Year | Peak chart positions |
| Title | Year | SWE |
|---|---|---|
| Every Bit of My Life | 1969 | — |
| From Both Sides | 1970 | — |
| Opopoppa (English: "Up'n Pop") | 1971 | — |
| Blåblus (English: Blue Suede) | 1972 | — |
| Pinewood Rally (with Blåblus) | 1973 | — |
| Out of the Blue (with Blåblus) | 1974 | — |
| Schiffz! | 1975 | 2 |
| Watch Out! | 1977 | 2 |
| Split Vision | 1979 | ─ |
| Zkiffz (album artist "Zkiffz") | 1980 | — |
| SPÖK! (English: "Haunting") | 1981 | 41 |
| If... Then... (Note: Each of the two words "If" and "Then" are followed by strange symbols. These characters are in fact PETSCII characters (special graphics building blocks) from the Commodore 64 home computer. If spelled out, the full title becomes If itreallyhappens Then itmustbepossible) | 1983 | — |
| Paris – Dakar – Köpenhamn (English: Paris – Dakar – Copenhagen) | 1984 | — |
| Chess | 1984 | — |
| Vild honung (English: Wild Honey) | 1985 | 21 |
| Zick Zack | 1987 | 31 |
| Back on track | 2001 | 8 |
| Ingen annan (English: Nobody Else) | 2002 | 19 |
| Decennier – Sånger från en annan tid (English: Decades – Songs from a Different Time) | 2005 | 1 |
| Andra decennier (English: Other Decades) | 2006 | 1 |
| i2i (Eye to Eye) | 2007 | 2 |
| Da Capo | 2010 | 3 |
| Break the Spell | 2011 | 1 |
| It's Christmas | 2021 | 4 |

=== EP/Singles ===
- 1973 – "Sally var en reko brud"
- 1973 – "Hooked on a Feeling"
- 1973 – "Never My Love"
- 1973 – "Silly Milly"
- 1975 – "Michelangelo"
- 1976 – "Firefly"
- 1977 – "Lady"
- 1977 – "Tarantula"
- 1978 – "Det blir alltid värre framåt natten"
- 1978 – "Rococo rendez-vous"
- 1981 – "Fångad i en dröm"
- 1985 – "Vild och vacker"
- 1985 – "The Arbiter (I Know the Score)"
- 1991 – "Om igen"
- 2010 – "When You Tell the World You're Mine" with Agnes Carlsson
- 2011 – "Break the Spell"
- 2012 – "Step Right Up"

=== Collections ===
- 1978 – Björns bästa / Björn Skifs' Greatest Hits
- 1981 – Björns ballader
- 1989 – Collection
- 1990 – Björn Skifs
- 1991 – Songs for you
- 1997 – 50/50
- 2004 – Skifs Hits!

== Filmography ==
- Drömkåken (1993) a.k.a. The Dream House
- Joker (1991)
- Strul (1988) a.k.a. Framed
- Smugglarkungen (1985) a.k.a. King of Smugglers
- Chess Moves (1984)
- Privatdeckarna: Uppdrag Gran Canaria (1984)
- Prima Veras saga om Olav den hellige (1983)
- En flicka på halsen (1982) a.k.a. Saddled with a Girl
- Sverige åt svenskarna (1980) a.k.a. Battle of Sweden, a.k.a. Sweden for the Swedes, a.k.a. The Drinking Man's War
- Toy Story (Swedish voice of Woody)
- Toy Story 2 (Swedish voice of Woody)

== Notes ==
Awards and achievements
| Preceded by Forbes with "Beatles" | Sweden in the Eurovision Song Contest; 1978 | Succeeded by Ted Gärdestad with "Satellit" |
| Preceded by Tomas Ledin with "Just nu!" | Sweden in the Eurovision Song Contest; 1981 | Succeeded by Chips with "Dag efter dag"' |
