= Close Your Eyes (Chuck Willis song) =

Single by The Five Keys
- B-side: "Doggone It, You Did It"
- Released: January 31, 1955
- Genre: R&B
- Length: 2:16
- Label: Capitol
- Songwriter: Chuck Willis

The Five Keys singles chronology
| "Ling, Ting, Tong" (1954) | "Close Your Eyes" (1955) | "My Love" (1955) |

"Close Your Eyes" is a song written by Chuck Willis and performed by The Five Keys. It reached number 5 on the U.S. R&B chart in 1955.

== Other charting versions ==
- The Skyliners released a version of the song as a single in 1961 which reached number 105 on the U.S. pop chart.
- The Three Degrees released a version of the song as a single in 1965 which reached number 126 on the U.S. pop chart.
- Peaches & Herb released a version of the song as a single in 1967 which reached number 4 on the U.S. R&B chart and number 8 on the U.S. pop chart. Their version ranked number 71 on Billboard magazine's Top 100 singles of 1967.
- Aaron Neville featuring Linda Ronstadt released a version of the song as a single in 1992 which reached number 2 on the UK Singles Chart, number 38 on the U.S. adult contemporary chart and number 90 on the Canadian Singles Chart. It was featured on Neville's 1991 album, Warm Your Heart.

== Other versions ==
- Ray Noble Orchestra with Al Bowlly released an original version of this song in 1933/4.
- Steve and Eydie released a version of the song as a single in 1955, but it did not chart.
- Jaye P. Morgan released a version of the song as the B-side to her 1961 single "Catch Me a Kiss".
- The Bobbettes released a version of the song as a single in 1963, but it did not chart.
- The Dells released a version of the song on their 1968 album There Is.
- Houston Person released a version of the song on his 1969 album Goodness!.
- Earl Lewis and The Channels released a version of the song as the B-side to their 1973 single "Work with Me Annie".
- General Kane released a version of the song on their 1987 album Wide Open.
