= Never My Love =

1967 single by The Association

- West German picture sleeve

Single by the Association

from the album Insight Out
- B-side: "Requiem for the Masses"
- Released: August 9, 1967
- Recorded: March 27 and June 3, 1967
- Genre: Pop; soft rock; psychedelia
- Length: 3:07 (album); 2:49 (single)
- Label: Warner Bros.
- Songwriters: Don Addrisi; Dick Addrisi
- Producer: Bones Howe

The Association singles chronology
"Windy" (1967)	"Never My Love" (1967)	"Everything That Touches You" (1968)

"Never My Love" is a pop standard written by American siblings Don and Dick Addrisi, and best known from a hit 1967 recording by the Association. The Addrisi Brothers had two Top 40 hits as recording artists, but their biggest success as songwriters was "Never My Love". Recorded by dozens of notable artists in the decades since, in 1999 the music publishing rights organization Broadcast Music, Inc. (BMI) announced it was the second most-played song on radio and television of the 20th century in the U.S.

== History ==
The first recording of "Never My Love" to achieve success was by the Association, an American sunshine pop band from California. Their version of the song, recorded with members of the Wrecking Crew, peaked at number two on the Billboard Hot 100 chart in October 1967, kept out of the number one spot by "The Letter" by the Box Tops, and hit number one on the Cashbox charts, one of the band's five top-ten hits in the late 1960s. Their third number 1 on the Cashbox Top 100 Singles Chart, following "Cherish" (1966) and "Windy" (1967), it was featured on the band's album Insight Out (1967). The song also reached number one in Canada's RPM charts.

By the time the Association's record was certified Gold by the RIAA for one million copies sold as of December 1967, Billboard noted that 16 artists had recorded the song. Their third number one single had made them a top concert act and highly in demand by the TV variety series, specials, and talk shows that were a predominant format at the time, and they performed the hit on The Ed Sullivan Show, The Andy Williams Show, The Smothers Brothers Comedy Hour, The Hollywood Palace, The Dean Martin Show, Dick Clark's American Bandstand, Hullabaloo, The Tonight Show Starring Johnny Carson, The Dick Cavett Show, The Joey Bishop Show, The Steve Allen Show, and a Carol Channing special.

== Description ==
AllMusic's Stewart Mason wrote of the "laid-back and dreamy" single with a "sleek and sophisticated" tune that "the dual lead vocals, by Terry Kirkman and Larry Ramos, are supported by wordless harmonies as effortlessly airy as whipped cream." Mason credited Ray Pohlman's "clever arrangement (with adding) space to the sound through juxtaposing disparate elements like the five-note bass riff that introduces the verses and the electric piano lick that ornaments the chorus, rather than jamming them on top of each other." Mason observed that it sounded "like Pohlman had been paying particular attention to Burt Bacharach's work with Dionne Warwick, a resemblance the 5th Dimension later amplified on their cover of the song."

The Addrisi Brothers themselves recorded the song three times: The first recording from 1970 remained unreleased until 2001, when Varèse Sarabande released the CD Never My Love – The Lost Album Sessions. The second recording was released as an album track on their 1972 debut album, We've Got To Get It On Again, on Columbia Records. The third recording was released in late 1977 as a single on Buddah Records, which peaked at number 80 on the Hot 100 and number 28 on Billboard's Easy Listening chart and was also included on their second album, Addrisi Brothers.

== Personnel ==
According to the Insight Out album 2011 reissue, 2002 compilation Just the Right Sound: The Association Anthology, The Association 'Cherish' book, and "Never My Love" AFM contracts:

The Association

- Terry Kirkman – lead vocals
- Larry Ramos – lead vocals
- The Association – vocals

Additional musicians

- Hal Blaine – drums
- Clark Burroughs – vocal arrangement
- Al Casey – guitar
- Mike Deasy – guitar
- Bones Howe – tambourine; producer, engineer
- Larry Knechtel – electric piano, electric organ
- Joe Osborn – bass guitar

Single version overdub musicians

- Arthur Briegleb – french horn
- Jules Cheikin – trumpet
- Ian Freebairn-Smith – trumpet
- John T. Johnson – saxophone
- Oliver Mitchell – trumpet
- Gale Robinson – french horn
- Robert Ross – unknown

== Charts ==
=== Weekly charts ===
The Association

Chart (1967)	Peak position
Canada RPM Top Singles	1
New Zealand (Listener)	6
US Billboard Hot 100	2
US Cash Box Top 100	1
US Record World Singles Chart	2

The Fifth Dimension

Chart (1971–72)	Peak position
Canada RPM Top Singles	9
US Billboard Hot 100	12
US Billboard Adult Contemporary	1
US Cash Box Top 100	14

Blue Swede

Chart (1974)	Peak position
Canada RPM Top Singles	7
US Billboard Hot 100	7
US Cash Box Top 100	10

Addrisi Brothers

Chart (1977–78)	Peak position
Canada RPM Top Singles	66
US Billboard Hot 100	80
US Billboard Adult Contemporary	28
US Cash Box Top 100	69

Sugar Minott

Chart (1981)	Peak position
UK Singles Chart	52

=== Year-end charts ===
Chart (1967)	Rank
Canada	14
US Billboard Hot 100	20
US Cash Box Top 100	33

Chart (1971)	Rank
US Adult Contemporary (Billboard)	12

Chart (1974)	Rank
Canada	96

== Legacy ==
In 1999, the song was recognized as the second most-played song in history, with performances of more than seven million, according to BMI. The number 2 rank on the Top 100 Songs of the Century, listing the most-played songs on American radio and television, placed "Never My Love" between the number 1 song "You've Lost That Lovin' Feelin'", written by Barry Mann, Phil Spector, and Cynthia Weil, and the number 3 song "Yesterday" by Lennon–McCartney. BMI estimated that the song had received, as of 1999, what amounted to about 40 years of continuous airplay in its 32 years.

In August 2006, music critic David Raposa placed the song at number 152 on Pitchfork's list of the 200 greatest songs of the 1960s, writing "While the Association's happy-together harmonies might make them seem like just another chirpy pop group aching to be hoisted upon Charles Manson's petard, there's a wispy melancholy to "Never My Love" that lifts it above the rabble. This reassuring affirmation of amour is a California dream that knows the alarm could go off at any time, which, in a world of silly love songs, makes all the difference."

== The 5th Dimension version ==
"Never My Love"

Single by the 5th Dimension

from the album The 5th Dimension/Live!!
- B-side: "A Love Like Ours"
- Released: September 1, 1971
- Recorded: April 19 – June 26, 1971
- Genre: Pop
- Length: 3:45
- Label: Bell
- Songwriters: Don Addrisi; Dick Addrisi
- Producer: Bones Howe

The 5th Dimension singles chronology
"Light Sings" (1971)	"Never My Love" (1971)	"Together Let's Find Love" (1971)

The cover by the American pop group the 5th Dimension was produced by the same man behind the Association's record, Bones Howe. Recorded in 1971, their version reached number 12 on the Hot 100 in November of that year. The recording also hit number one on the Billboard Easy Listening chart, the group's fourth to top that chart, following "Aquarius/Let the Sunshine In" (1969), "Wedding Bell Blues" (1969), and "One Less Bell to Answer" (1970). The group's version of "Never My Love" reached number 45 on the Billboard R&B chart. This version also hit number 9 in the Canadian charts. Allmusic's Matthew Greenwald wrote of the 5th Dimension's single, "This version, a vocal solo from Marilyn McCoo, is a great vehicle for her powerful pop voice... A song that has one of the most direct, straightforward loving messages, it remains one of the most-played and performed songs of the pop era, and for good reason."

== Blue Swede version ==
"Never My Love"

Single by Blue Swede

from the album Hooked on a Feeling
- B-side: "Pinewood Rally"
- Released: 1974
- Recorded: 1974
- Genre: Pop
- Length: 2:27
- Label: EMI
- Songwriters: Don Addrisi; Dick Addrisi
- Producer: Bengt Palmers

Blue Swede singles chronology
"Hooked on a Feeling" (1974)	"Never My Love" (1974)	"Hush" (1975)

The Swedish rock band Blue Swede covered "Never My Love" in 1974. This version peaked at number seven on the Hot 100 and remained in the Top 40 for eight weeks and was the third hit version of the song. This version reached number 7 in Canada. Their version was an upbeat take on the song.

== Other cover versions ==
Additional versions of the song that reached the Billboard charts in the U.S. include the Sandpipers (No. 98 pop, 1968); Vern Gosdin and Janie Fricke (No. 9 country; No. 30 CAN Country, 1978); and Chill Factor (No. 62 R&B, 1988).

In 2013, Japanese boyband A.B.C-Z released the song in DVD format, reaching the 1st. spot in the Oricon weekly ranking for DVDs in its release week (not complete), while reaching 2nd as its top rank.

== See also ==
- List of Cash Box Top 100 number-one singles of 1967
- List of number-one adult contemporary singles of 1971 (U.S.)
- List of recordings of songs Hal Blaine has played on
