= Hooked on a Feeling (song) =

Pop song written by Mark James, first recorded by B.J. Thomas in 1968

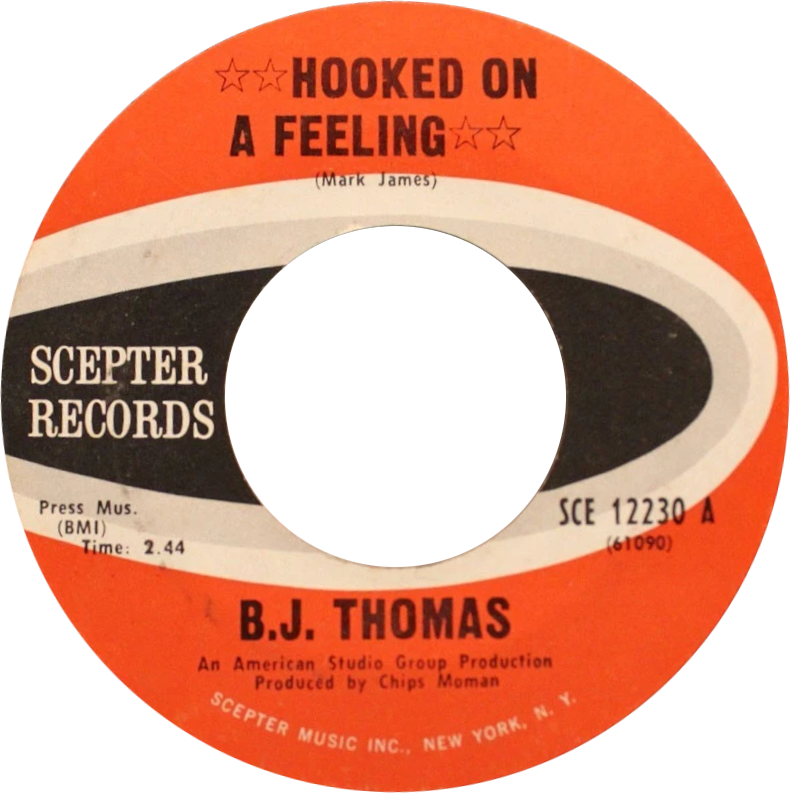
- US single of the original B. J. Thomas recording

Single by B. J. Thomas

from the album On My Way
- B-side: "I've Been Down This Road Before"
- Released: October 29, 1968
- Recorded: 1968
- Studio: American Sound (Memphis, Tennessee)
- Genre: Pop; psychedelia
- Length: 2:48
- Label: Scepter
- Songwriter: Mark James
- Producer: Chips Moman

B. J. Thomas singles chronology
"The Eyes of a New York Woman" (1968)	"Hooked on a Feeling" (1968)	"It's Only Love" (1969)

Lyric video
- "Hooked on a Feeling" by B. J. Thomas on YouTube

Audio
- "Hooked on a Feeling" by B. J. Thomas on YouTube

Live video
- "Hooked on a Feeling" (live, 2009) by B. J. Thomas on YouTube

"Hooked on a Feeling" is a 1968 pop song written by Mark James and first recorded by American singer B. J. Thomas. Thomas's version featured the sound of the electric sitar (played by Reggie Young) and reached No. 5 in 1969 on the Billboard Hot 100. It has been recorded by many other artists, including Blue Swede, whose version reached No. 1 in the United States in 1974.

== Production ==
The song was written by Mark James, who was introduced to producer Chips Moman around 1967 by Moman's mutual friend Steve Tyrell, a singer and James' manager. James was hired by early 1968 to write for Moman's publishing company, which led to him writing songs for many artists, including his childhood friend B.J. Thomas. One of these songs was "Hooked on a Feeling", which James wrote about the thrills of being in love, inspired by his feelings for his childhood sweetheart. It was recorded at the American Sound Studio in Memphis, Tennessee in 1968, with musicians Tommy Cogbill (guitar) Reggie Young (guitar), Mike Leech (bass) and Gene Chrisman (drums). It was first released on October 29 of that year. Country artists Louise Mandrell and RC Bannon also recorded and released this song in 1979. The band Mercy included a version on their first album in 1968.

== Charts ==
Weekly charts
Chart (1968–1969)	Peak position
Australia (Go-Set)	35
Canada Top Singles (RPM)	3
New Zealand (Listener)	10
US Billboard Hot 100	5
US Cash Box Top 100	5

Year-end charts
Chart (1969)	Rank
Canada (RPM)	31
US Billboard Hot 100	99

== Blue Swede version ==
"Hooked on a Feeling"
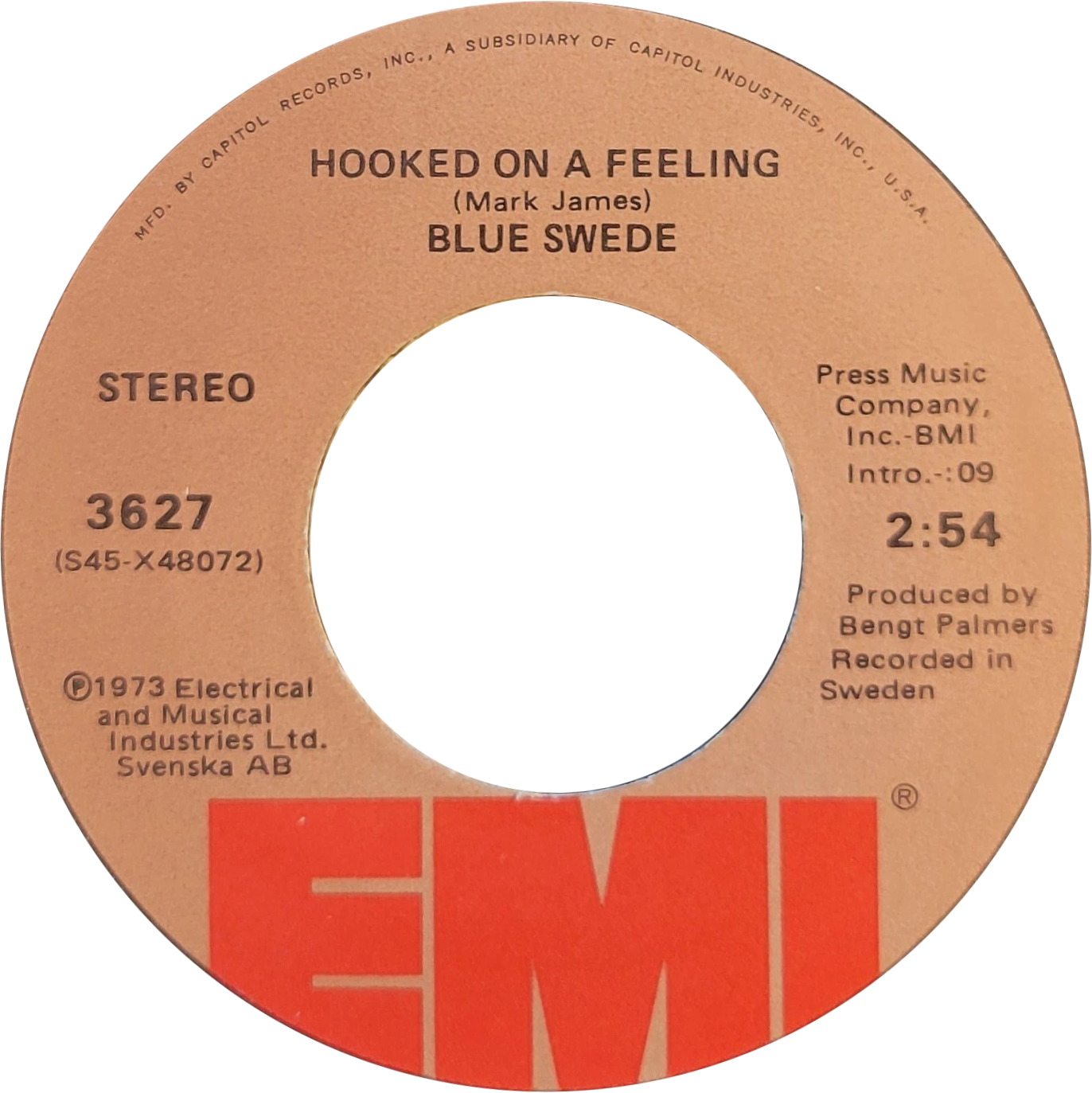
- 1974 US reissue of the Blue Swede recording

Single by Blue Swede

from the album Hooked on a Feeling
- B-side: "Gotta Have Your Love"
- Released: May 1973
- Genre: Pop rock
- Length: 2:48
- Label: EMI Svenska
- Songwriter: Mark James
- Producer: Bengt Palmers

Blue Swede singles chronology
"Hooked on a Feeling" (1973)	"Silly Milly" (1973)

Vinyl video
- "Hooked on a Feeling" by Blue Swede on YouTube

In 1973, the Swedish pop rock group Blue Swede released a cover version, which included the ooga chaka introduction from a 1971 cover by Jonathan King. It is commonly claimed that King had heard Johnny Preston's "Running Bear", which was the inspiration for the ooga chaka chant, but King said, "the chant had nothing to do with Running Bear – it was my idea to use the reggae rhythm in an unusual way, that's all."

The Blue Swede version of the song also tweaked the lyrics to avoid any possible interpretation of a drug reference. The original song included the lines:

I got it bad for you girl,
But I don't need a cure
I'll just stay addicted,
And hope I can endure

In place of that, Blue Swede sang:

Got a bug from you girl,
But I don't need no cure
I just stay a victim,
If I can for sure

Blue Swede's version reached No. 1 on the US Billboard Hot 100 chart in April 1974; Billboard ranked it as the No. 20 song for 1974. There is a popular misconception in Sweden that it reached number one the same day ABBA won the Eurovision Song Contest with "Waterloo". "Hooked on a Feeling" also entered the top 10 in Australia, Canada, and New Zealand. In 1992, the song appeared on the soundtrack to the American crime film Reservoir Dogs. Following that appearance, the song charted in Iceland, reaching No. 2 in March 1993. In August 2014, the song charted in the United Kingdom for the first time, reaching No. 90.

Record World said that "the opening hook will have buyers crying for the 'oogah chugga' record."

=== Personnel ===
Personnel, according to the liner notes of the 2004 compilation album Skifs Hits!

- Björn Skifs – lead vocals, backing vocals
- Bo Liljedahl – bass guitar, backing vocals
- Ladislav Balaz – organ, electric piano, backing vocals
- Jan Guldbäck – drums, backing vocals
- Michael Areklew – guitar, backing vocals
- Hinke Ekestubbe – tenor saxophone
- Tommy Berglund – trumpet, arranger
- Claes Dieden – backing vocals
- Björn Norén – engineer
- Bengt Palmers – producer

=== Charts ===
Weekly charts
Chart (1974)	Peak position
Australia (Kent Music Report)	4
Canada Top Singles (RPM)	2
New Zealand (Listener)	7
US Billboard Hot 100	1
US Adult Contemporary (Billboard)	31
US Cash Box Top 100	1

Chart (1993)	Peak position
Iceland (Íslenski Listinn Topp 40)	2

Chart (2014)	Peak position
UK Singles (Official Charts)	90

Year-end charts
Chart (1974)	Rank
Australia (Kent Music Report)	29
Canada Top Singles (RPM)	27
US Billboard Hot 100	20
US Cash Box Top 100	34

== Release history of Blue Swede version ==
Region	Date	Ref.
USA	February 1974	
Australia	25 March 1974	

== In popular culture ==
In 1992, Blue Swede's recording was featured on the soundtrack of Quentin Tarantino's debut feature, Reservoir Dogs.

In 1998, during an episode of the legal comedy-drama series Ally McBeal, "Cro-Magnon", the main character's neurosis about being able to conceive a child before her biological clock runs out, is illustrated by her imagining a computer-generated baby dancing into her bedroom to Blue Swede's recording of "Hooked on a Feeling". A website featuring the dancing baby and the Blue Swede recording became an internet meme.

The 2014 film Guardians of the Galaxy, which featured the brass fanfare and title lyrics of Blue Swede's version prominently in its trailers and theatrical release, resulted in a significant spike in sales for the recording; the film's soundtrack topped the Billboard 200 chart in August 2014. The song was also featured in the teaser trailer for the 2017 sequel, Guardians of the Galaxy Vol. 2.

The song was performed by Blue Swede's lead vocalist Björn Skifs as the opening act of the final of the Eurovision Song Contest 2024 in Malmö.

The song is used in the game Cities: Skylines Gold F.M. radio.

== Certifications ==
Region	Certification	Certified units/sales
Denmark (IFPI Danmark)	Gold	45,000^{‡}
Spain (Promusicae)	Gold	30,000^{‡}
United Kingdom (BPI) Blue Swede version	Platinum	600,000^{‡}
United States (RIAA) B.J. Thomas version	Gold	1,000,000^{^}
United States (RIAA) Blue Swede version	Gold	1,000,000^{^}
^{^} Shipments figures based on certification alone.^{‡} Sales+streaming figures based on certification alone.

== Covers ==
- In 1971, British musician Jonathan King recorded a cover version of the song, also with ooga chaka chants. King described it as "a reggae rhythm by male voices". His version reached No. 23 on the UK Singles Chart in November 1971.
