= Apples, Peaches, Pumpkin Pie =

Single by Jay & the Techniques

from the album Apples, Peaches, Pumpkin Pie
- B-side: "Stronger Than Dirt"
- Released: March 1967
- Recorded: January 1967
- Studio: Bell Sound (New York City)
- Genre: Soul
- Length: 2:24
- Label: Smash
- Songwriters: Maurice Irby, Jr.
- Producer: Jerry Ross

Jay & the Techniques singles chronology
"Apples, Peaches, Pumpkin Pie" (1967)	"Keep the Ball Rollin'" (1967)

"Apples, Peaches, Pumpkin Pie" is a 1967 song written by Maurice Irby, Jr. and first released by Sam the Sham and The Pharaohs in November 1966 as "Ready or Not". It was a hit in a version produced by Jerry Ross, arranged by Joe Renzetti and performed by Jay & the Techniques on their 1968 album of the same name.

== Background ==
Bobby Hebb was originally offered "Apples, Peaches, Pumpkin Pie", but rejected it due to its novelty sound. Jerry Ross then offered it to Jay & the Techniques. The song was originally recorded in January 1967 at Bell Sound Studios in New York with Ross producing and Joe Renzetti arranging and conducting. Nick Ashford and Valerie Simpson provided backing vocals, accompanying the lead singer Jay Proctor; Ross used session musicians for the instrumental backing in place of the Techniques. This process would continue for all of the band's singles recorded after this.

== Chart performance ==
"Apples, Peaches, Pumpkin Pie" reached #6 on the Billboard chart and #8 on the U.S. R&B chart Outside the United States, it peaked at #6 on the Canadian R&B chart, and #61 on the Canadian pop chart.

== Other versions ==
- Sam the Sham and the Pharaohs, using the title "Ready or Not", on their 1967 The Best of Sam the Sham and the Pharaohs album on MGM Records (#SE-4422.)
- Truman Thomas, on his 1967 album Groovin' on the United Artists side label Veep (#VPS 16517).
- The Fourmost, a single in November 1968.
- Mary Wells, on her 1968 album, Servin' Up Some Soul.
- Foster Sylvers, on his 1974 album, Foster Sylvers Featuring Pat & Angie Sylvers.
- Brave Combo, on their 1999 album, Polkasonic.
