= Jay & the Techniques =

US musical group

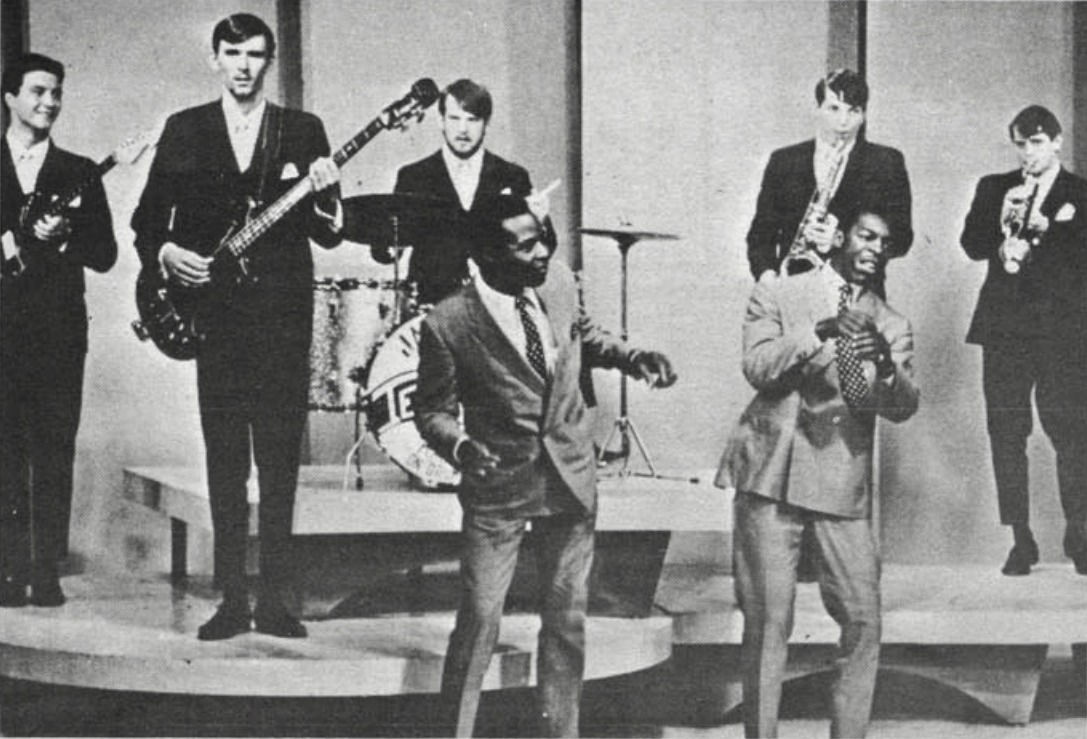

Background information
- Origin: Allentown, Pennsylvania
- Genres: Pop, Soul
- Years active: mid-1960s
- Labels: Smash, Mercury
- Past members: Jay Proctor; George "Lucky" Lloyd; Dante Dancho; Chuck Crowl; Karl Landis (Lippowitsch); Ronnie Goosley; Jon Walsh

Jay & the Techniques was an American pop group formed in Allentown, Pennsylvania during the mid-1960s. Their song "Apples, Peaches, Pumpkin Pie", released in 1967 on the Smash label, reached the Top 10 on the Billboard Hot 100 chart.

== Career ==
The band was best known for their debut single, "Apples, Peaches, Pumpkin Pie", which was released in 1967 and reached No. 6 in the Billboard Hot 100 chart. The track was arranged by Joe Renzetti, and written by Maurice Irby, Jr. It sold over one million copies, and was awarded a gold disc. Although this song served as the band's primary hit, the group also captured various chart positions with "Keep the Ball Rollin'" (No. 14) and "Strawberry Shortcake". "Keep the Ball Rollin'" also notched up sales in excess of a million copies, to secure a second gold disc for this group. However, its position on the 1960s pop charts declined after "Baby Make Your Own Sweet Music" was released. They made their final effort with the R&B hit, "Number Onederful", but after that, the group disbanded.

"Apples, Peaches, Pumpkin Pie" and "Baby Make Your Own Sweet Music" (the latter a cover of a single first released in 1967 by Johnny Johnson and the Bandwagon) were both released in the UK by Mercury Records and, whilst neither song charted in the UK, in the early 1970s both songs became dance favourites of the British Northern soul music scene.

In 1996, Mercury Records released a compilation album of the band's hits entitled The Best of Jay & The Techniques.

== Original band members ==
- Jay Proctor: Lead vocalist and primary founder of the group
- George "Lucky" Lloyd: Second vocalist
- Dante Dancho: Lead guitar
- Chuck Crowl: Bass guitar
- Karl Landis (Lippowitsch): Drums (was replaced by Paul Coles, Jr.)
- Ronnie Goosley: Saxophone
- Jon Walsh: Trumpet (was replaced by Danny Altieri)

Nick Ashford, Valerie Simpson and Melba Moore often served as backing vocalists.

The band was multiracial, Proctor and George (Lucky) Lloyd being the only Black African-Americans in the group.

== Discography ==
=== Albums ===
Year	Album	Billboard 200	Record label
1968	Apples, Peaches, Pumpkin Pie	129	Smash Records
1968	Love, Lost & Found	–	Smash Records
1995	The Best of Jay and the Techniques	–	Mercury Records
2009	Baby Make Your Own Sweet Music: The Very Best of Jay & the Techniques	–	RPM Records

=== Singles ===
Year	Title	Peak chart positions						Record Label	B-side	Album
Year	Title	US	US R&B	US Dance	AU	CAN	CAN R&B	Record Label	B-side	Album
1967	"Apples, Peaches, Pumpkin Pie"	6	8	–	30	61	6	Smash Records	"Stronger Than Dirt"	Apples, Peaches, Pumpkin Pie
1967	"Keep the Ball Rollin'"	14	–	–	71	–	–	Smash Records	"Here We Go Again"	Apples, Peaches, Pumpkin Pie
1968	"Strawberry Shortcake"	39	–	–	–	27	–	Smash Records	"Still (In Love With You)"	Love, Lost & Found
1968	"Baby Make Your Own Sweet Music"	64	–	–	–	53	–	Smash Records	"Help Yourself to All My Lovin'"	
1968	"The Singles Game"	116	–	–	–	–	–	Smash Records	"Baby How Easy Your Heart Forgets Me"	
1968	"Hey Diddle Diddle"	–	–	–	–	–	–	Smash Records	"If I Should Lose You"	Apples, Peaches, Pumpkin Pie
1969	"Are You Ready for This"	–	–	–	–	–	–	Smash Records	"Change Your Mind" (No. 107 BB)	
1969	"Dancin' Mood"	–	–	–	–	–	–	Smash Records	"If I Should Lose You"	
1972	"Robot Man"	–	–	–	–	–	–	Gordy Records	"I'll Be Here"	
1974	"I Feel Love Coming On"	–	–	6	–	–	–	Silver Blue Records	"This World of Mine"	
1976	"Number Onederful"	–	94	11	–	–	–	Event Records	"Don't Ask Me to Forget"	

== See also ==
- List of Mercury Records artists
