= Blue Swede =

Swedish rock band (1973-1979)

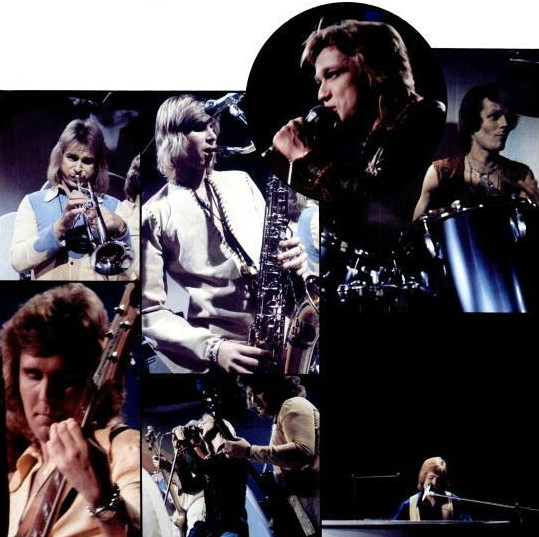
- The band in 1974

Background information
- Origin: Stockholm, Sweden
- Genres: Pop rock, glam rock
- Years active: 1973–1979
- Label: EMI
- Past members: Michael Areklew; Anders Berglund; Tommy Berglund; Hinke Ekestubbe; Jan Guldback; Bosse Liljedahl; Björn Skifs

Blue Swede (Swedish: Blåblus) were a Swedish rock band fronted by Björn Skifs which was active between the years 1973–1979. Blue Swede released two albums of cover versions, including a rendition of "Hooked on a Feeling", which brought them international chart success. The band consisted of Anders Berglund (piano), Björn Skifs (lead vocals), Bosse Liljedahl (bass), Hinke Ekestubbe (saxophone), Jan Guldbäck (drums), Michael Areklew (guitar), and Tommy Berglund (trumpet). They disbanded after Skifs decided to embark on his solo career.

== Career ==
Blue Swede was first formed in 1973, when Björn Skifs, a top vocalist in Sweden, was looking for a band to accompany him during his concerts.

The band was originally called "Blåblus" (Swedish for "blue blouse" [could be made out of denim], a pun on the word "blues") and featured Skifs singing the lead vocals. The band got their international breakthrough in 1974 with their cover of the 1968 B. J. Thomas song "Hooked on a Feeling". Blue Swede recorded Thomas's song in 1973, but based its rendition of the song on a 1971 version released by British pop eccentric Jonathan King, which created the "ooga-chaka" introduction. The producer at the recording sessions was Bengt Palmers. Blue Swede released "Hooked on a Feeling" in Sweden in May 1973 and in the United States in February 1974. The song reached number one in the U.S. for one week in April 1974 and stayed in the Billboard Hot 100 chart for 18 weeks. The track also topped charts in Australia, Canada, and the Netherlands, where it reached a peak chart position of 26. To capitalize on the success of the song, Blue Swede released the album Hooked on a Feeling that same year.

Throughout the rest of 1974, two follow-up singles from the same LP were released: "Silly Milly", which peaked at position 71 in the U.S., and a cover of The Association's "Never My Love", which made the Top Ten by peaking at position 7. From the band's 1974 follow-up album, Out of the Blue, they recorded a medley of "Hush" by Deep Purple and "I'm Alive" by Tommy James and the Shondells (not The Hollies' song of the same name), peaking at position 61 in the U.S., and achieving its greatest chart success in Scandinavia. Skifs left the band in 1975 and the band continued as Blåblus, releasing a further two albums.

== Discography ==
=== Albums ===
Title	Album details	Peak chart positions			
Title	Album details	SWE	AUS	CAN	US
Pinewood Rally	Released: December 1973; Label: EMI; Formats: LP, MC	5	—	—	—
Hooked on a Feeling	Released: March 1974; Label: EMI; Formats: LP, MC, 8-track; International revised version of Pinewood Rally	—	53	84	80
Out of the Blue	Released: October 1974; Label: EMI; Formats: LP, MC, 8-track	4	—	—	—
Better Days Are Coming	Released: 1976; Label: EMI; Formats: LP, MC	—	—	—	—
De' e vi som spelar på skivan	Released: 1978; Label: EMI; Formats: LP, MC	—	—	—	—
"—" denotes releases that did not chart or were not released in that territory.

=== Singles ===
Title	Year	Peak chart positions										Album
Title	Year	SWE	AUS	BE (FLA)	CAN	GER	NL	NZ	UK	US	US AC	Album
"Hooked on a Feeling"	1973	2	4	18	2	22	26	7	90 (Note: Charted in 2014.)	1	31	Pinewood Rally / Hooked on a Feeling
"Silly Milly"	1973	9	—	—	50	—	—	—	—	71	—	Pinewood Rally / Hooked on a Feeling
"Half Breed"	1973	—	—	—	—	—	—	—	—	—	—	Pinewood Rally
"Sally var en reko brud"	1974	—	—	—	—	—	—	—	—	—	—	Non-album single
"Doctor Rock 'n Roll"	1974	—	—	—	—	—	—	—	—	—	—	Out of the Blue
"Never My Love"	1974	—	52	—	7	—	—	—	—	7	—	Pinewood Rally / Hooked on a Feeling
"Hush"/"I'm Alive" (medley)	1975	—	—	—	90	—	—	—	—	61	—	Out of the Blue
"Boo, Boo Don't Cha Be Blue"	1976	—	—	—	—	—	—	—	—	—	—	Better Days Are Coming
"Låt mej lära känna dej"	1977	—	—	—	—	—	—	—	—	—	—	De' e vi som spelar på skivan
"Har jag gjort bort mig nu igen?"	1977	—	—	—	—	—	—	—	—	—	—	Non-album single
"Na Na Hey Hey Kiss Him Goodbye"/"Galaxy Take-Off" (medley)	1978	—	—	—	—	—	—	—	—	—	—	De' e vi som spelar på skivan
"Då dansar Angela"	1978	—	—	—	—	—	—	—	—	—	—	De' e vi som spelar på skivan
"När inga ord räcker till"	1979	—	—	—	—	—	—	—	—	—	—	Non-album single
"—" denotes releases that did not chart or were not released in that territory.

== See also ==
- List of Swedes in music
- Dancing baby, a.k.a. The ooga-chaka baby
