= Love Is Here and Now You're Gone =

- Solid center variant of the UK single

Single by the Supremes

from the album The Supremes Sing Holland–Dozier–Holland
- B-side: "There's No Stopping Us Now"
- Released: January 11, 1967 (U.S.)
- Recorded: Los Angeles, August 12, 1966; Hitsville U.S.A. (Studio A), September 22 and November 13, 1966
- Genre: Pop; R&B
- Length: 2:45
- Label: Motown – M 1103
- Songwriter: Holland–Dozier–Holland
- Producers: Brian Holland; Lamont Dozier

The Supremes singles chronology
"You Keep Me Hangin' On" (1966)	"Love Is Here and Now You're Gone" (1967)	"The Happening" (1967)

Licensed audio
- "Love Is Here and Now You're Gone" on YouTube

"Love Is Here and Now You're Gone" is a 1967 song recorded by the Supremes for the Motown label.

Written and composed by Motown's main production team Holland–Dozier–Holland, it became the second consecutive number-one pop single from the Supremes' album The Supremes Sing Holland–Dozier–Holland and the group's ninth overall chart-topper in the United States on Billboard Hot 100, peaking March 1967.

== Background ==
=== History ===
The song, which depicts a relationship in the beginning stages of breakup ("You persuaded me to love you/And I did/But instead of tenderness/I found heartache instead"), features several spoken sections from lead singer Diana Ross, who delivers her dialogue in a dramatic, emotive voice. Matching the song's drama influences is an instrumental track, featuring a prominent harpsichord and strings, which recalls both a Hollywood film score and The Left Banke's recently popularized "Baroque rock."

Primarily recorded in Los Angeles, California, thousands of miles away from Motown's regular Hitsville U.S.A. recording studio, "Love Is Here and Now You're Gone" was the #1 song on the U.S. Billboard Hot 100 for one week, from March 5 to March 11, 1967, becoming the group's ninth number-one single. The single was also the group's sixth number one on the R&B charts. The girl group performed the hit record on NBC's The Andy Williams Show on Sunday, January 22, 1967, going to number one seven weeks later. Lyricist Eddie Holland names "Love is Here" as his favorite Supremes song.

Cash Box said the single is a "bright, rhythmic, pulsating Motown-sound excursion" in which the Supremes are "at the top of their form."

=== Personnel ===
- Lead vocals by Diana Ross
- Backing vocals by Florence Ballard and Mary Wilson
- Instrumentation and additional background vocals by Los Angeles area studio musicians
- Written by Brian Holland, Lamont Dozier, and Eddie Holland
- Produced by Brian Holland and Lamont Dozier
- Arranged by Gene Page

== Chart history ==
=== Weekly charts ===
Chart (1967)	Peak position
Australia (Go-Set)	40
Australia (Kent Music Report)	45
Belgium (Ultratop 50 Wallonia)	48
Canada Top Singles (RPM)	1
UK Singles (Official Charts)	17
Netherlands (Dutch Top 40)	35
UK R&B (Record Mirror)	1
US Billboard Hot 100	1
US Hot R&B/Hip-Hop Songs (Billboard)	1
US Cashbox Top 100	1
US Cashbox R&B	2
US Record World 100 Top Pops	1
US Record World Top 50 R&B	3

=== Year-end charts ===
Chart (1967)	Rank
Canada Top Singles (RPM)	40
US Billboard Hot 100	26
US Hot R&B/Hip-Hop Songs (Billboard)	17
US Cashbox Top 100	40
US Cashbox R&B	38

== Certifications ==
Region	Certification	Certified units/sales
United States	—	1,000,000

== Cover versions ==
Michael Jackson later covered "Love Is Here and Now You're Gone" for his solo debut album, Got to Be There. On the 45 versions, it was the B-side of his number two smash, "Rockin' Robin". It also featured on the "Jackson and the Beanstalk" episode of the Jackson 5ive cartoon series in 1972.

Tami Lynn covered this song on her debut album, Love Is Here and Now You're Gone in 1972.

Phil Collins included this song on his 2010 album of soul covers, Going Back.

== See also ==
- List of Hot 100 number-one singles of 1967 (U.S.)
