= List of compositions by Witold Lutosławski =

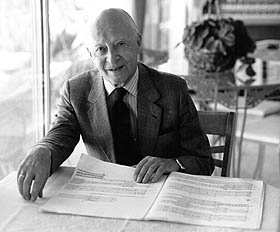
Witold Lutosławski in 1993

This is a list of compositions by Polish composer Witold Lutosławski. A complete list of Lutosławski's compositions in chronological order can be found at The Polish Music Center.

== By genre ==
=== Orchestral ===
- Symphonies:
  - Symphony No. 1 (1941–47)
  - Symphony No. 2 (1965–67)
  - Symphony No. 3 (1981–83)
  - Symphony No. 4 (1988–92)
- Symphonic Variations (1936–8)
- Overture for Strings (1949)
- Little Suite, for chamber orchestra (1950), for symphony orchestra (1951)
- Concerto for Orchestra (1950–54)
- Musique funèbre (Muzyka żałobna), for string orchestra (1954–58)
- Three Postludes for Orchestra (1958–63)
- Jeux vénitiens (Venetian Games) for chamber orchestra (1960–61)
- Livre pour orchestre (1968)
- Preludes and a Fugue, for 13 solo strings (1970–72)
- Mi-parti (1975–76)
- Novelette (1978–79)
- Chain I, for chamber ensemble (1983)
- Fanfare for Louisville, for woodwinds, brass, and percussion (1985)
- Chain III, for orchestra (1986)
- Prelude for G.M.S.D., for orchestra (1989)
- Interlude for Orchestra (1989, to link Partita and Chain 2)

=== Concertante ===
- Piano
  - Variations on a Theme by Paganini, for piano and orchestra (1978, see below)
  - Piano Concerto (1987–88)
- Violin
  - Chain II, dialogue for violin and orchestra (1984–85)
  - Partita, for violin and orchestra (1988, see below)
  - Violin Concerto (1994) (fragments only)
- Cello
  - Cello Concerto (1969–70)
  - Grave, metamorphoses for cello and string orchestra (1981, see below)
- Clarinet
  - Dance Preludes, for clarinet and chamber orchestra (1955, see below)
- Other
  - Double Concerto for Oboe, Harp and Chamber Orchestra (1979–80)

=== Vocal ===
- Lacrimosa, for soprano, optional SATB chorus, and orchestra (1937, surviving fragment of a Requiem)
- Pieśni walki podziemnej (Songs of the Underground) for voice and piano (1942–44)
- Twenty Polish Christmas Carols (Dwadzieścia kolęd), for voice and piano (1946, orchestrated 1984–89)
- Silesian Triptych (Tryptyk Śląski), for soprano and orchestra (1951)
- Children's Songs, for voice and piano (1953, orchestrated 1954)
- Five Songs, for soprano and piano (1957, orchestrated 1958)
- Trois poèmes d'Henri Michaux, for chorus and orchestra (1961–63)
- Paroles tissées (Woven Words), for tenor and chamber orchestra (1965)
- Les Espaces du sommeil (Spaces of Sleep), for baritone and orchestra (1975)
- Chantefleurs et Chantefables, for soprano and orchestra (1989–90)

=== Chamber/instrumental ===
- Piano Sonata (1934)
- Variations on a Theme by Paganini, for two pianos (1941, see above)
- Melodie Ludowe (Folk Melodies), 12 easy pieces for piano (1945)
- Recitative e Arioso, for violin and piano (1951)
- Dance Preludes (Lutoslawski), for clarinet and piano (1954)
- Dance Preludes, for nine instruments (1959, see above)
- Bukoliki (Bucolics) for viola and cello (1952, arranged 1962)
- String Quartet (1964)
- Epitaph in memoriam Alan Richardson for oboe and piano (1979)
- Grave, metamorphoses for cello and piano (1981, see above)
- Mini Overture, for brass quintet (1982)
- Tune for Martin Nordwall, for trumpet (1984)
- Partita, for violin and piano (1984, see above)
- Slides, for chamber ensemble (1988)
- Subito, for violin and piano (1991)

=== Film music ===
- Odrą do Bałtyku (Along the Oder to the Baltic), documentary film (1945)
- Suita Warszawska (Warsaw Suite), 35mm documentary film (1946)

== Chronological ==
- Prelude for piano (1922)
- Small pieces for piano (1923–1926)
- Lullaby in E major for piano (1926)
- Three Preludes for piano (1927)
- Two Sonatas for violin and piano (1927, 1928)
- Poeme for piano (1928)
- Variations for piano (1929)
- Dance of the Chimera for piano (1930)
- Scherzo for orchestra (1930)
- Hymn of the Pupils of the Stefan Batory State Gymnasium in Warsaw for mixed chorus a capella (1930–1931)
  - Version for male chorus
- Haroun al. Rashid for orchestra (1931)
- Two songs (Water-Nymph and Linden Lullaby) for voice and piano (1934)
- Piano Sonata (1934) 25’
- Music for three educational films Fire, Beware!, Short-circuit (1935–1937)
- Double Fugue for orchestra (1936)
- Prelude and aria for piano (1936)
- Requiem aeternam and Lacrimosa for choir and orchestra (1937) 3’
- Symphonic Variations for orchestra (1936–1938) 9’
- Two studies for piano (1940–1941) 5’
- Variations on a theme by Paganini for two pianos (1941) 6’
  - Version for piano and orchestra (1979)
- Songs of the Underground Struggle for voice and piano (1942–1944) 15’
- Fifty Contrapuntal Studies for Woodwind, etc. (1943–1944)
- Trio for oboe, clarinet, and bassoon (1944–1945) 16’
- Folk Melodies for piano (1945) 10’
- Five Folk Melodies – transcribed for string orchestra (1952)
- Four Silesian Melodies – transcribed for four violins (1954)
- Three Carols for male and female solo voices, unison mixed chorus, and chamber ensemble (1945) 11’
- Along the Oder to the Baltic (1945) 39’Music for a documentary film
- Warsaw Suite (1946) 35’Music for a documentary film
- Twenty Carols for voice and piano (1946)
  - Transcribed for soprano voice, female chorus and orchestra (1984–1989) 45–50’
- Symphony No. 1 for orchestra (1941–1947) 25’
- Six Children's Songs for voice and piano (1947) 8’
  - Transcribed for children's choir and orchestra (1952)
  - Transcribed for mezzo-soprano and orchestra (1953)
- Two Children's Songs for voice and piano (1948) 4’ written to the words by Julian Tuwim
  - Transcribed for voice and chamber orchestra (1952)
- The Snowslide for voice and piano (1949) 5’
- Overture for Strings (1949) 5’
- Little Suite for chamber orchestra (1950) 11’
  - Version for symphonic orchestra (1951)
- Service to Poland – a mass song for voice and piano (1950)
  - Version for male chorus and piano (1951)
- I Would Marry – a mass song for voice and piano (1950)
  - Version for mixed chorus a capella (1951)
- The Road of Victory a mass song for voice and piano (1950)
- Strawchain and Other Songs for soprano, mezzo-soprano, flute, oboe, 2 clarinets, and bassoon (1950–1951) 10’
- Silesian Triptych for soprano and orchestra (1951) 10’
- Recitativo e arioso for violin and piano (1951) 3’
- Spring, children's songs for mezzo-soprano and chamber orchestra (1951) 8’
- Autumn, children's songs for mezzo-soprano and chamber orchestra (1951) 7’
- Ten Polish Folksongs on Soldiers’ Themes for male chorus a capella (1951)
- We Are Going Forward a mass song for voice and piano (1951)
  - Version for mixed chorus a capella (1951)
- Nowa Huta – a mass song for voice and piano (1952)
- The Most Beautiful Dream a mass song for voice and piano (1952)
  - Version for mixed chorus and male chorus a capella (1952)
- Cockle Shell and A Silver Windowpane (1952)
  - Version for mezzo-soprano and chamber orchestra (1953)
- Bucolics for piano (1952) 5’
  - Version for viola and cello (1962)
- Comrade – a mass song for voice and piano (1952)
  - Version for mixed chorus and orchestra (1952)
- Spring week – a mass song for voice and piano (1952)
  - Version for mixed chorus and orchestra (1952)
- Song about a Sloe-Tree a mass song for voice and piano (1952)
- Three Fragments for flute and harp (1953) 3’40’’
- Three soldier songs for voice and piano (1953)
- Ten Polish Dances for chamber orchestra (1953)
- Miniature for Two Pianos (1953) 2’
- Three Pieces for the Young for piano (1953) 4’
- A Little Sparrow and A Little Feather, children's songs for voice and piano (1953)
  - Version for voice and chamber orchestra (1953)
- Garlands and Goodbye to Holiday, children's songs for voice and piano (1953)
- Dandelions for orchestra
- Sleep, Sleep, a children's song for mezzo-soprano and chamber orchestra (1954)
- Winter Waltz for dance orchestra (1954)
- Night is falling, a children's song for mezzo-soprano and chamber orchestra (1954)
- Vegetables for mezzo-soprano and chamber orchestra (1954)
- Difficult Sums, a children's song for mezzo-soprano and chamber orchestra (1954)
- Concerto for Orchestra (1950–1954) 30’
- Four Orchestral Signals (1954)
- Dance Preludes for clarinet in B-flat and piano (1954) 7’
  - Transcribed for clarinet and chamber orchestra (1955)
  - Transcribed for nine instruments (1959)
- An Overheard Tune for four part piano (1957) 5’
- Five Songs to Kazimiera Iłłakowiczówna's poems for soprano and piano (1957) 10’
  - Transcribed for soprano and instrumental ensemble (1958)
- Musique funèbre (Muzyka żałobna) (1954–1958) 15’
- Night Owl and A twiglet, a children's songs for voice and piano (1956–58)
- Song on April Fools’Day, a children's song for voice and piano (1958)
- Cuckoo, Cuckoo!, a children's song for voice and piano (1958)
- The Tale of the Little Spark and Other Songs for Children for voice and piano (1958)
- On Wronia Street in Warsaw, a children's song for voice and piano (1958)
- Six Christmas Carols for 3 recorders (1959)
- Three children's songs for voice and piano written to lyrics by Benedykt Hertz (1959)
- Three Postludes for orchestra (1958–1963) 17’
- Jeux vénitiens (Venetian Games) for chamber orchestra (1960–1961) 13’
- Trois poemes d’Henri Michaux/ Three Poems of Henri Michaux for mixed chorus and orchestra of winds and percussion (1961–1963) 20’
- String Quartet (1964) 24’
- Paroles tissées (Woven Words) for tenor and chamber orchestra (1965) 15’
- Symphony No. 2 (1965–1967) 30’
- Invention for piano (1968) 1’
- Livre pour orchestre (1968) 20’
- Cello Concerto (1969–1970) archi 24’
- Preludes and Fugue for 13 solo strings (1970–1972) 34’
- Les espaces du sommeil (Spaces of Sleep) for baritone and orchestra (1975) 15’
- Sacher Variation for cello solo (1975) 5’
- Mi-parti for orchestra (1975–1976) 15’
- Novelette for orchestra (1978–1979) 18’
- Epitaph for oboe and piano (1979) 5’
- Double Concerto for oboe, harp and chamber orchestra (1979–1980) 20’
- Grave. Metamorphoses for cello and piano (1981) 7’
  - Transcribed for cello and 13 string instruments (1982)
- Not for You for soprano and piano (1981) 1’50’’
- Mini Overture for brass quintet (1982) 3’ (1211)
- Lord Tennyson Song for male chorus (1982)
- Symphony No. 3 (1981–1983) 28’
- Chain 1 for chamber ensemble (1983) 10’
- The Holly and the Ivy for voice and piano (1984) 2’
- Tune for Martin Nordwall for trumpet(1984) 1’
- Partita for violin and piano (1984) 15’
  - Version for violin and orchestra (1988)
- Chain 2. Dialogue for violin and orchestra (1984–1985) 18’
- Chain 3 for orchestra (1985) 10’
- Fanfare for Louisville for wind instruments and percussion (1986) 2’
- Fanfare for CUBE for brass quintet (1987) 30’’
- Piano Concerto (1987–1988) 25’
- Slides for 11 soloists (1988) 4’
- Prelude for G.S.M.D. (1989) 4’
- Fanfare for University of Lancaster (1989) 1’
- Interlude for orchestra (1989) 5’
- Lullaby ”for Anne-Sophie” for violin and piano (1989)
- Tarantella for baritone and piano (1990) 3’
- Chantefleurs et Chantefables for soprano and orchestra (1989–1990) 20’
- Symphony No. 4 (1988–1992) 22’
- Subito for violin and piano (1992) 4’
- Fanfare for Los Angeles Philharmonic for brass instruments and percussion (1993) 1’
- Violin Concerto (fragments only)
