= Robert Desnos =

French writer

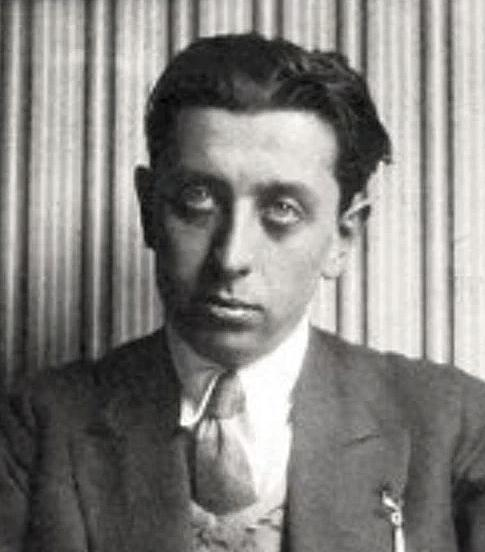
- Robert Desnos in 1924
- Born: 4 July 1900; Paris, France
- Died: 8 June 1945 (aged 44); Theresienstadt concentration camp, Czechoslovakia
- Known for: Poetry

Robert Desnos (French: [ʁɔbɛʁ dɛsnos]; 4 July 1900 – 8 June 1945) was a French poet who played a key role in the Surrealist movement.

== Early life ==
Robert Desnos was born in Paris on 4 July 1900, the son of a licensed dealer in game and poultry at the Halles market. Desnos attended commercial college, and started work as a clerk. He also worked as an amanuensis for journalist Jean de Bonnefon. After that he worked as a literary columnist for the newspaper Paris-soir.

== Career ==
The first poems by Desnos to appear in print were published in 1917 in La Tribune des Jeunes (Platform for Youth) and in 1919 in the avant-garde review Le Trait d'union (Hyphen), and also the same year in the Dadaist magazine Littérature. In 1922 he published his first book, a collection of surrealistic aphorisms, with the title Rrose Sélavy (the name adopted as an "alternative persona" by the avant-garde French artist Marcel Duchamp; a pun on "Eros, c'est la vie").

In 1919 he met the poet Benjamin Péret, who introduced him to the Paris Dada group and André Breton, with whom he soon became friends. In 1920, he did his military service which led him to Chaumont and then Morocco.

While working as a literary columnist for Paris-Soir, Desnos was an active member of the Surrealist group and developed a particular talent for automatic writing. He, together with writers such as Louis Aragon and Paul Éluard, would form the literary vanguard of surrealism. André Breton included two photographs of Desnos sleeping in his surrealist novel Nadja. Although he was praised by Breton in his 1924 Manifeste du Surréalisme Desnos later disagreed with Surrealism's involvement in communist politics, which caused a rift between him and Breton. Desnos continued work as a columnist.

In 1926 he composed The Night of Loveless Nights, a lyric poem dealing with solitude curiously written in classic quatrains, which makes it more like Baudelaire than Breton. It was illustrated by his close friend and fellow surrealist Georges Malkine. Desnos fell in love with Yvonne George, a singer whose obsessed fans made his love impossible. He wrote several poems for her, as well as the erotic surrealist novel La liberté ou l'amour! (1927). Critic Ray Keenoy describes La liberté ou l'amour! as "literary and lyrical in its outpourings of sexual delirium".

By 1929 Breton definitively condemned Desnos, who in turn joined Georges Bataille and Documents, as one of the authors to sign Un Cadavre (A Corpse) attacking "le bœuf Breton" (Breton the ox or Breton the oaf). He wrote articles on "Modern Imagery", "Avant-garde Cinema" (1929, issue 7), "Pygmalion and the Sphinx" (1930, issue 1), and Sergei Eisenstein, the Soviet filmmaker, on his film titled The General Line (1930, issue 4).

His career in radio began in 1932 with a show dedicated to Fantômas. During that time, he became friends with Picasso, Hemingway, Artaud and John Dos Passos; published many critical reviews on jazz and cinema; and became increasingly involved in politics. He wrote for many periodicals, including Littérature, La Révolution surréaliste and Variétés. Besides his numerous collections of poems, he published three novels, Deuil pour deuil (1924), La Liberté ou l'amour! (1927) and Le vin est tiré (1943); a play, La Place de l'étoile (1928; revised 1944); and a film script, L'Étoile de mer (1928), which was directed by Man Ray that same year.

== Resistance and deportation ==
During World War II, Desnos was an active member of the French Résistance network Réseau AGIR, under the direction of Michel Hollard, often publishing under pseudonyms. For Réseau Agir, Desnos provided information collected during his job at the journal Aujourd'hui and made false identity papers, and was arrested by the Gestapo on 22 February 1944.

He was first deported to the German concentration camps of Auschwitz in occupied Poland, then Buchenwald, Flossenburg in Germany and finally to Terezín (Theresienstadt) in occupied Czechoslovakia in 1945.

== Death ==
Desnos died in Malá pevnost, which was an inner part of Terezín used only for political prisoners, from typhoid, a month after the camp's liberation. There is a moving anecdote about Desnos's last days after the liberation while being tended to by a young Czech medical student, Josef Stuna, who recognised him thanks to reading Breton's Nadja.

He is buried at the Montparnasse cemetery in Paris.

Susan Griffin relates a story, previously recounted slightly differently in an article by her that appears in González Yuen, that exemplifies Desnos' surrealist mindset; his capacity to envisage solutions that defy conventional logic:

Even in the grimmest of circumstances, a shift in perspective can create startling change. I am thinking of a story I heard a few years ago from my friend Odette, a writer and a survivor of the holocaust. Along with many others who crowd the bed of a large truck, she tells me, Robert Desnos is being taken away from the barracks of the concentration camp where he has been held prisoner. Leaving the barracks, the mood is somber; everyone knows the truck is headed for the gas chambers. And when the truck arrives no one can speak at all; even the guards fall silent. But this silence is soon interrupted by an energetic man, who jumps into the line and grabs one of the condemned. Improbable as it is, Odette explains, Desnos reads the man's palm. Oh, he says, I see you have a very long lifeline. And you are going to have three children. He is exuberant. And his excitement is contagious. First one man, then another, offers up his hand, and the prediction is for longevity, more children, abundant joy. As Desnos reads more palms, not only does the mood of the prisoners change but that of the guards too. How can one explain it? Perhaps the element of surprise has planted a shadow of doubt in their minds. If they told themselves these deaths were inevitable, this no longer seems so inarguable. They are in any case so disoriented by this sudden change of mood among those they are about to kill that they are unable to go through with the executions. So all the men, along with Desnos, are packed back onto the truck and taken back to the barracks. Desnos has saved his own life and the lives of others by using his imagination.

=== Legend of "The Last Poem" ===
A so-called "Last Poem" (Dernier poème) has been published numerous times; it was even set to music by Francis Poulenc in 1956. However, this poem never existed. The belief in its existence started after a misunderstanding. A Czech newspaper Svobodné noviny (Free Newspaper) published his obituary which ended with the sentence "In a strange, tragic way his verses have fulfilled" followed by a quote from Desnos' poem I Dreamt About You So Much translated by a Czech poet Jindřich Hořejší and printed in six lines. When re-published in France in Les Lettres Françaises, the sentence was translated in a completely wrong way: "A strange and tragic fate gave a concrete meaning to a poem, the only one found with him and dedicated probably to his spouse" followed by an erroneous translation of the aforementioned verses (furthermore, the translation excluded the last line of the Czech translation). Due to this the legend of "The Last Poem" survived well into the 1970s. It was thanks to a Czech translator Adolf Kroupa and his two well-founded articles in Les Lettres Françaises (June 1960, August 1970) that this false belief in the poem started to cease to exist.

== Personal life ==
Desnos was married to Youki Desnos, formerly Lucie Badoud, nicknamed "Youki" ("snow") by her lover Tsuguharu Foujita before she left him for Desnos. Desnos wrote several poems about her. One of his most famous poems is "Letter to Youki", written after his arrest.

== Legacy ==
Desnos' poetry has been set to music by a number of composers, including Witold Lutosławski with Les Espaces du sommeil (1975) and Chantefleurs et Chantefables (1991), Francis Poulenc (Dernier poème, 1956) and Henri Dutilleux with Le Temps l'Horloge (2007). A selection from Chantefleurs et Chantefables was set by Jean Wiener. Carolyn Forché has translated his poetry and names Desnos as a significant influence on her own work. Dutch composer Marjo Tal set several of Desnos’ poems to music.

In 1974, at the urging of Robert Desnos' widow, Joan Miró published an "illustrated book" with text from Robert Desnos titled Les pénalités de l'enfer ou les nouvelles Hébrides (The Penalties of Hell or The New Hebrides), Maeght Editeur, Paris, 1974. It was a set of 25 lithographs, five in black, and the others in colors.

In 2006, the book was displayed in "Joan Miró, Illustrated Books" at the Vero Beach Museum of Art. One critic said it is "an especially powerful set, not only for the rich imagery but also for the story behind the book's creation. The lithographs are long, narrow verticals, and while they feature Miró's familiar shapes, there's an unusual emphasis on texture." The critic continued, "I was instantly attracted to these four prints, to an emotional lushness, that's in contrast with the cool surfaces of so much of Miró's work. Their poignancy is even greater, I think, when you read how they came to be. The artist met and became friends with Desnos, perhaps the most beloved and influential surrealist writer, in 1925, and before long, they made plans to collaborate on a livre d'artist. Those plans were put on hold because of the Spanish civil war and World War II. Desnos' bold criticism of the latter led to his imprisonment in Theresienstadt, and he died at age 45 shortly after his release in 1945. Nearly three decades later, at the suggestion of Desnos' widow, Miró set out to illustrate the poet's manuscript. It was his first work in prose, which was written in Morocco in 1922 but remained unpublished until this posthumous collaboration."

A reading of "Relation d'un Rêve" (Description of a Dream) recorded by Desnos for radio broadcast in 1938 can be heard on the audiobook CD Surrealism Reviewed, issued in 2002.

The 2023 novel Traitor Comet, by Personne, is the first in a series on Desnos's life and his friendship with the poet Antonin Artaud. The sequel, L'Etoile de Mer (The Starfish), was published in November 2024, and continues the story of Desnos as he defies André Breton and becomes obsessed with the wife of Tsuguharu Foujita, (later to become Desnos's wife), Youki.

== Publications ==
- (1924) Deuil pour deuil; English translation: Mourning for Mourning (2012)
- (1926) C'est les bottes de sept lieues cette phrase "Je me vois"; English translation: That Line "I See Myself" is Seven-League Boots (2017)
- (1927) La Liberté ou l’amour!; English translation: Liberty or Love! (1997)
- (1930) The Night of Loveless Nights
- (1930) Corps et biens (Body and Goods)
- (1932) L'arbre qui boit du vin (The Tree Who Drinks Wine)
- (1934) Les Sans Cou (The Cut Necks)
- (1942) Fortunes
- (1943) État de veille (State of Alert)
- (1943) Le vin est tiré (The Wine is Drawn)
- (1944) Contrée (Against the Grain)
- (1944) Le Bain Avec Andromède (Bathing with Andromeda)
- (1944) Trente Chantefables; English translation: Storysongs (2014)
- (1945) Félix Labisse
- (1945) La Place de l'Étoile

=== Published posthumously ===
- (1946) Choix de poèmes (includes previously unpublished works selected and prefaced by Paul Eluard)
- (1947) Rue de la Gaîté
- (1947) Les Trois Solitaires
- (1947) Les Regrets de Paris
- (1947) Cinq Poètes assassinés: Saint-Pol-Roux, Max Jacob, Roberts Desnos, Benjamin Fondane, André Chennevière (includes works by Desnos, selected by Robert Ganzo)
- (1949) Roberts Desnos (includes previously unpublished works selected by Pierre Berger)
- (1952, 1955, 1970) Chantefables et Chantefleurs à chanter sur n'importe quel air (reprints the thirty Chantefables (1944); includes thirty previously unpublished Chantefleurs (1952), plus twenty additional Chantefleurs (1955))
- (1953) De l'érotisme considéré dans ses manifestations écrites et du point de vue de l'esprit moderne (previously unpublished text of 1923, written by Desnos for Jacques Doucet)
- (1953) Domaine public (includes many previously unpublished works selected by René Bertelé)
- (1957) Mines de rien
- (1962) Calixto, suivi de Contrée
- (1966) Cinéma
- (1974) Les Pénalités de l'enfer ou Les Nouvelles Hébrides
- (1975) Destinée arbitraire (includes many previously unpublished works selected by Marie-Claire Dumas)
- (1978) Nouvelles Hébrides et autres textes (edited by Marie-Claire Dumas)
- (1984) Écrits sur les peintres (works about painters, written by Desnos and edited by Marie-Claire Dumas)
- (1987) Les Voix intérieures (Audiobook CD; collection of songs and reviews, written by Desnos and edited by L. Cantaloube-Ferrieu)
- (2017) Robert Desnos, Surrealist, Lover, Resistant: Collected Poems, translated and introduced by Timothy Adès (dual language text, French and English), Arc Publications

== Filmography ==
- L'Étoile de mer (1928) – in collaboration with Man Ray

== Discography ==
- Lutoslawski: Vocal Works (Chandos Records, 2011) – Includes selections from Les Espaces du sommeil and Chantefleurs et Chantefables
