= Cello Concerto (Lutosławski) =

1970 cello concerto by Witold Lutosławski

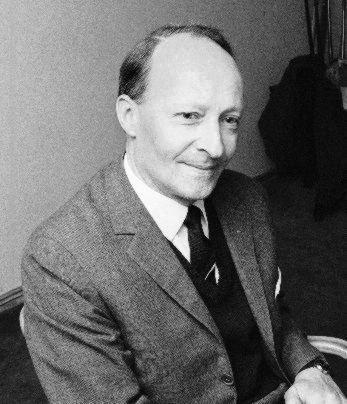
Witold Lutosławski during his visit to Finland, 10 March 1965

The Concerto for Cello and Orchestra is a cello concerto by the Polish composer Witold Lutosławski. The work was commissioned by the Royal Philharmonic Society with support from the Calouste Gulbenkian Foundation. It received its world premiere at the Royal Festival Hall on October 14, 1970, by the cellist Mstislav Rostropovich (to whom the piece is dedicated) and the Bournemouth Symphony Orchestra under the direction of Edward Downes.

== Composition ==
=== Structure ===
The concerto has a duration of roughly 24 minutes and is composed in four movements played without pause.

1. Introduction
2. Four Episodes
3. Cantilena
4. Finale

=== Instrumentation ===
The work is scored for solo cello and a large orchestra comprising three flutes (all doubling piccolo), three oboes, three clarinets (3rd doubling bass clarinet), three bassoons (3rd doubling contrabassoon), four horns, three trumpets, three trombones, tuba, timpani, percussion, piano, celesta, harp, and strings.

== Reception ==
The cello concerto is one of Lutosławski's most celebrated works. The music critic Andrew Clements of The Guardian called it "one of the Polish composer's greatest achievements". The writer Michael McManus similarly wrote, "I have always had a special affection for Witold Lutosławski's Cello Concerto. Like so many of his works, it is tautly composed, relatively short and full of contrasts. Intriguingly, it also strikes me as sitting to some degree outside the mainstream of his otherwise clear compositional phases, emanating from his most avant-garde period but somehow not fully belonging to it."

== See also ==
- List of compositions by Witold Lutosławski
