= Léonie Sonning Music Prize =

Danish music award

- Awarded for: "internationally recognised composer, musician, conductor or singer"
- Sponsored by: The Léonie Sonning Music Foundation
- Location: Copenhagen
- Country: Denmark
- Reward: €133,000
- First award: 1959
- Website: www.sonningmusik.dk

The Léonie Sonning Music Prize, or Sonning Award, which is recognized as Denmark's highest musical honor, is given annually to an international composer or musician. It was first awarded in 1959 to composer Igor Stravinsky. Laureates are now selected by the directors of The Léonie Sonning Music Foundation, which was founded in 1965.

The diploma is in Danish, and the prize includes EUR 133,000 (US$146,400) and a monotype by the Danish painter Maja Lisa Engelhardt. Honorees are treated to a concert, typically held in Copenhagen, and are often invited to teach a master class of Danish musicians.

The award is not directly related to the Sonning Prize, which is the Danish award presented by a foundation in memory of Sonning's late husband, Carl Johan Sonning.

== Laureates ==
Year	Laureate	Country	Notes
1959	Igor Stravinsky	United States	
1965	Leonard Bernstein	United States	
1966	Birgit Nilsson	Sweden	
1967	Witold Lutosławski	Poland	
1968	Benjamin Britten	United Kingdom	
1969	Boris Christoff	Bulgaria	
1970	Sergiu Celibidache	Romania	
1971	Arthur Rubinstein	Poland/United States	
1972	Yehudi Menuhin	United States	
1973	Dmitri Shostakovich	Soviet Union	
1974	Andrés Segovia	Spain	
1975	Dietrich Fischer-Dieskau	West Germany	
1976	Mogens Wöldike	Denmark	
1977	Olivier Messiaen	France	
1978	Jean-Pierre Rampal	France	
1979	Janet Baker	United Kingdom	
1980	Marie-Claire Alain	France	
1981	Mstislav Rostropovich	Soviet Union	
1982	Isaac Stern	United States	
1983	Rafael Kubelík	Czechoslovakia	
1984	Miles Davis	United States	
1985	Pierre Boulez	France	
1986	Sviatoslav Richter	Soviet Union	
1987	Heinz Holliger	Switzerland	
1988	Peter Schreier	East Germany	
1989	Gidon Kremer	Soviet Union	
1990	György Ligeti	Hungary/Austria	
1991	Eric Ericson	Sweden	
1992	Georg Solti	Hungary/United Kingdom	
1993	Nikolaus Harnoncourt	Austria	
1994	Krystian Zimerman	Poland	
1995	Yuri Bashmet	Russia	
1996	Per Nørgård	Denmark	
1997	Andras Schiff	Hungary/United Kingdom	
1998	Hildegard Behrens	Germany	
1999	Sofia Gubaidulina	Russia	
2000	Michala Petri	Denmark	
2001	Anne-Sophie Mutter	Germany	
2002	Alfred Brendel	Austria	
2003	György Kurtág	Hungary	
2004	Keith Jarrett	United States	
2005	John Eliot Gardiner	United Kingdom	
2006	Yo-Yo Ma	United States	
2007	Lars Ulrik Mortensen	Denmark	
2008	Arvo Pärt	Estonia	
2009	Daniel Barenboim	Argentina	
2010	Cecilia Bartoli	Italy	
2011	Kaija Saariaho	Finland	
2012	Jordi Savall	Spain	
2013	Simon Rattle	United Kingdom	
2014	Martin Fröst	Sweden	
2015	Thomas Adès	United Kingdom	
2016	Herbert Blomstedt	Sweden	
2017	Leonidas Kavakos	Greece	
2018	Mariss Jansons	Latvia	
2019	Hans Abrahamsen	Denmark	
2020	Barbara Hannigan	Canada	
2021	Unsuk Chin	South Korea	
2022	Pierre-Laurent Aimard	France	
2023	Evelyn Glennie	Scotland	
2024	Emmanuel Pahud	Switzerland	
2025	Danish String Quartet	Denmark	
2026	Kirill Petrenko	Austria	
2027	Mitsuko Uchida	United Kingdom	
