= String Quartet (Lutosławski) =

1964 composition by Witold Lutosławski

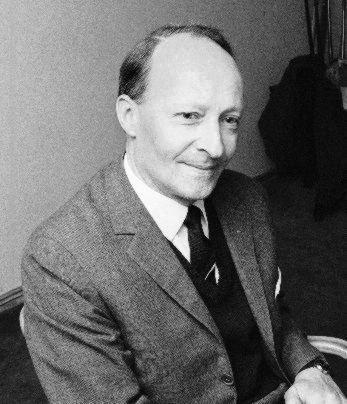
Witold Lutosławski during his visit to Finland, 10 March 1965

Witold Lutosławski's String Quartet was commissioned by Sveriges Radio for the tenth anniversary of its new music program "Nutida Musik." It was completed in 1964 and its world premiere was performed by the LaSalle Quartet in Stockholm on March 12, 1965.

== Composition ==
The String Quartet has a duration of approximately 24 minutes and is composed in two movements:

1. Introduction
2. Main Movement

Lutosławski described the piece in the score program notes, writing, "In this Quartet I have sought to develop and enlarge the technique employed in the two preceding works, Jeux Venitiens and Trois Poèmes d’Henri Michaux the technique of what I call controlled aleatorism. It employs the element of chance for the purpose of rhythmic and expressive enrichment of the music without limiting in the least the full ability of the composer to determine the definitive form of the work."

== Reception ==
The String Quartet has been praised by music critics and remains one of the most widely performed and recorded modern string quartets. Graham Rickson of The Arts Desk called it "fascinating, entertaining music" and wrote, "The music's complexities don't detract from its vivid, communicative power. Lutosławski's masterful ability to create beguiling sounds is just as potent in his chamber writing. The quartet's spectral ending remains astonishing."
