= Double Concerto (Lutosławski) =

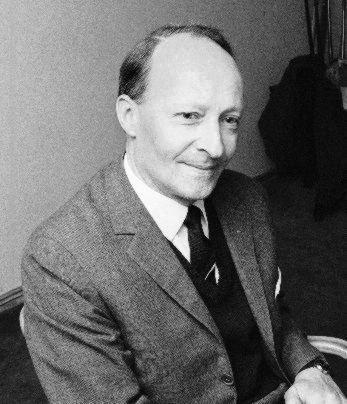
Witold Lutosławski in 1965

The Double Concerto for oboe, harp and chamber orchestra is a musical composition by the Polish composer Witold Lutosławski. It was commissioned by the conductor Paul Sacher for the oboist Heinz Holliger and harpist Ursula Holliger, Heinz's wife. The work was composed between 1979 and 1980 and was first performed by Heinz and Ursula Holliger and the Collegium Musicum Zürich under the direction of Sacher in Lucerne on August 24, 1980. The piece is dedicated to Sacher.

== Composition ==
In the score's programme note, Lutosławski wrote that the prospect of work with the Heinz and Ursula Holliger was "a great inspiration" while working on the concerto. He added, "The music is multi-faceted and just when it seems to be saying one thing, it is saying something else at the same time – sometimes in contradiction. The titles of the movements [...] are only to be taken figuratively."

The work is scored for solo oboe and harp and a reduced orchestra consisting of only two percussionists and strings. The concert has three movements:

1. Rapsodico
2. Dolente
3. Marciale e grotesco

It has a duration of approximately 20 minutes.

== Reception ==
Writing for the magazine Gramophone, the music critic Arnold Whittall opined, "The Double Concerto which Lutosławski composed for Heinz and Ursula Holliger is a fine example of his ability to use immediately accessible materials in imaginative and far from conventional ways, and there are few better instances of genuine comedy in 20th-century music than the concerto's finale, which perfectly complements the dirge-like atmosphere of the middle movement."

== See also ==
- List of compositions by Witold Lutosławski
