= Chantefleurs et Chantefables =

1991 song cycle by Witold Lutosławski

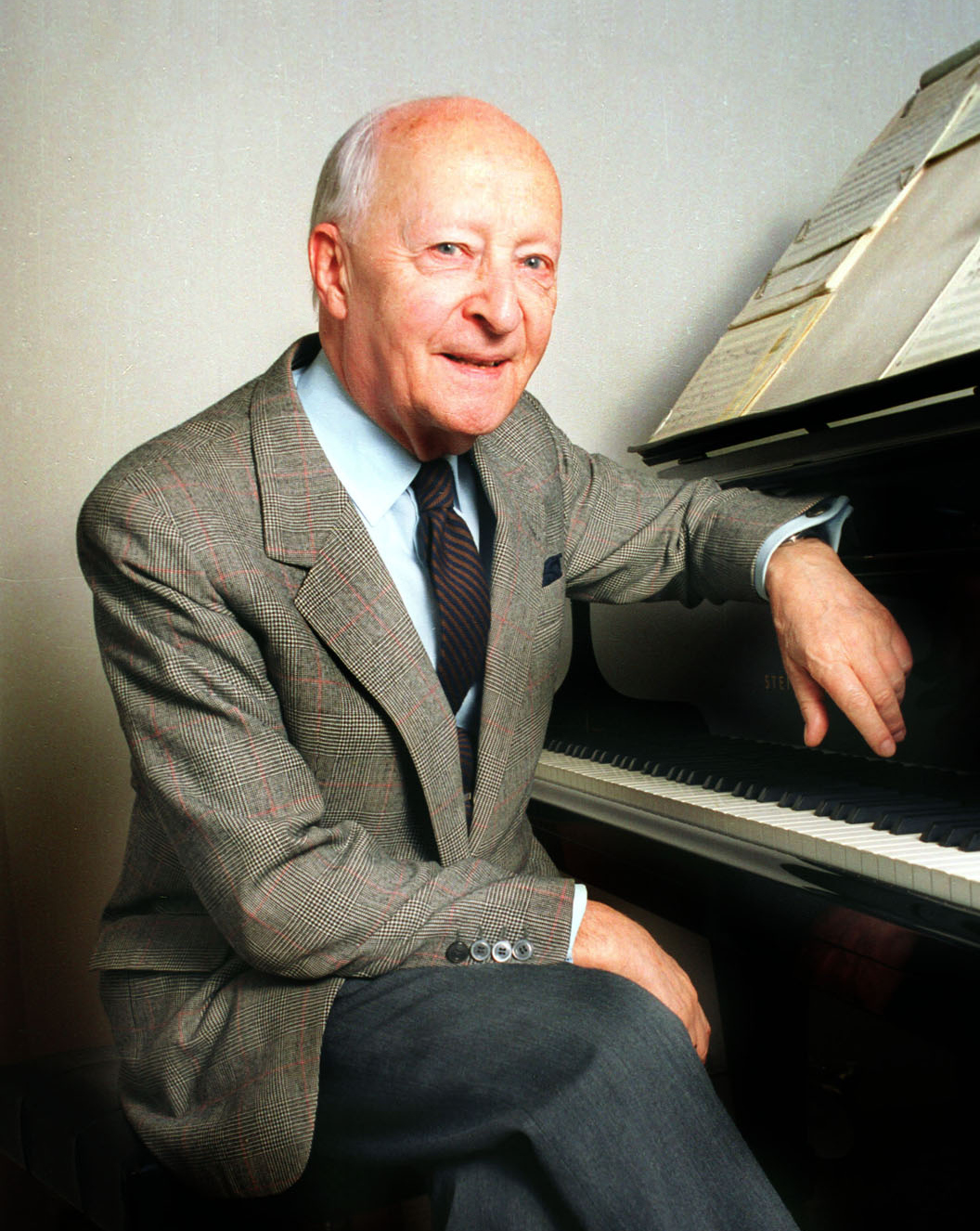
Witold Lutosławski in 1992

Chantefleurs et Chantefables is a song cycle for soprano and orchestra set to the poems of Robert Desnos by the Polish composer Witold Lutosławski. The work was composed from 1989 to 1991 and was first performed at The Proms by the soprano Solveig Kringlebotn and the BBC Symphony Orchestra under the direction of the composer on August 8, 1991. The piece is Lutosławski's second composition set to the poetry of Robert Desnos, following 1975's Les Espaces du sommeil.

== Composition ==
=== Structure ===
Chantefleurs et Chantefables has a duration of approximately 16 minutes and is composed in nine movements:

1. La Belle-de-Nuit
2. La Sauterelle
3. La Véronique
4. L'Églantine, l'aubépine et la glycine
5. La Tortue
6. La Rose
7. L'Alligator
8. L'Angélique
9. Le Papillon

=== Instrumentation ===
The work is scored for solo soprano and a small orchestra consisting of flute, oboe, clarinet (doubling bass clarinet and E-flat clarinet), bassoon (doubling contrabassoon), trumpet, horn, trombone, percussion, timpani, harp, piano (doubling celesta), and strings.

== Reception ==
Chantefleurs et Chantefables has been praised by music critics. Andrew Clements of The Guardian described the composition as "a series of tiny epigrammatic settings inhabiting a child-like surrealist world, which Lutosławski illuminates with wonderful precision." Keith Potter of BBC Music Magazine compared the piece to Lutosławski's Chain 1, observing that they are "so exquisite that they verge on the precious." The composer Russell Platt similarly described it as "one of the most gracious and affecting works of Lutosławski's last years."

== See also ==
- List of compositions by Witold Lutosławski
