= Les Espaces du sommeil =

1975 work for baritone and orchestra by Witold Lutosławski

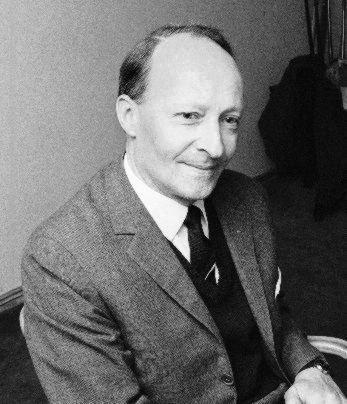
Witold Lutosławski during his visit to Finland, 10 March 1965

Les Espaces du sommeil is a musical composition by Polish composer Witold Lutosławski for baritone and orchestra, which takes its name from the poem it sets by French Surrealist Robert Desnos. It is in one movement, with a three-section scheme lacking clearly marked caesuras. Lutosławski said it was "neither a song nor a set of songs, but a symphonic poem with a baritone solo."

Composed in 1975, it was first performed on 12 April 1978 in Berlin by the baritone Dietrich Fischer-Dieskau and the Berlin Philharmonic Orchestra under the direction of the composer. The piece is Lutosławski's first composition set to the poetry of Robert Desnos, to which the composer returned in 1990's Chantefleurs et Chantefables.

== Composition ==
=== Structure ===
Les Espaces du sommeil lasts 15 minutes and is composed in one movement but with a three-section scheme:

1. Dans la nuit il y a naturellement les sept merveilles
2. Il y a toi l'immolée, toi que j'attends
3. Il y a toi sans doute que je ne connais pas

=== Instrumentation ===
The work is scored for solo baritone and an orchestra consisting of 3 flutes (2 & 3 doubling piccolo), 3 oboes, 3 clarinets in B♭ (3 doubling bass clarinet in B♭), 3 bassoons, 3 trumpets in C, 4 horns in F, 3 trombones, tuba, percussion, timpani, harp, piano (doubling celesta), and strings.

== Reception ==
Les Espaces du sommeil has been praised by music critics. Andrew Clements of The Guardian stated that "the orchestral forces of Les Espaces du sommeil, dedicated to the baritone Dietrich Fischer-Dieskau, are substantial and refined." George Hall of BBC Music Magazine mentioned "the atmospheric (...) setting of Robert Desnos exploring the borderland between waking and dreaming."

== See also ==
- List of compositions by Witold Lutosławski
