= Mi-parti =

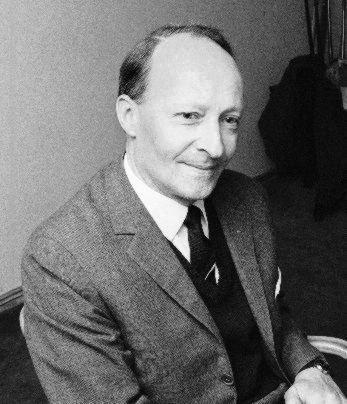
Witold Lutosławski during his visit to Finland, 10 March 1965

Mi-parti is an orchestral work by the Polish composer Witold Lutosławski, composed from 1975 to 1976 on a commission from the City of Amsterdam for the Concertgebouw Orchestra. The name broadly means in two equal but different parts, referring to the treatment of the material rather than the large-scale structure of the piece.

The first performance took place on 22 October 1976 in Rotterdam, with the composer conducting the Concertgebouw Orchestra.

== Instrumentation ==
The work calls for a large orchestra:

- woodwind: 3 flutes (all doubling piccolo), 3 oboes, 3 clarinets (3rd doubling bass clarinet), 3 bassoons
- brass: 3 trumpets in C, 4 horns, 3 trombones, 1 tuba
- percussion: timpani, 3 percussionists (bells, marimba, xylophone, glockenspiel, tam-tams, cymbals, vibraphone without motor)
- celesta, harp, piano
- and strings (8 first violins, 7 second violins, 6 violas, 6 cellos and 4 basses).

== Recordings ==
Orchestra	Conductor	Record Company	Year of Recording	Format
Polish Radio National Symphony Orchestra	Witold Lutosławski	EMI Classics	1976	CD
BBC Philharmonic Orchestra	Yan Pascal Tortelier	Chandos	1996	CD
Polish Radio National Symphony Orchestra	Antoni Wit	Naxos Records	1998	CD
Warsaw Philharmonic Orchestra	Antoni Wit	CD Accord	2004	CD

Awards:

- for EMI recording: International Critics’ Award, 1979; Deutsche Schallplattenpreis 1977
- for the piece: State Prize, 1st grade 1978
