= Krystian Zimerman =

Polish classical pianist (born 1956)

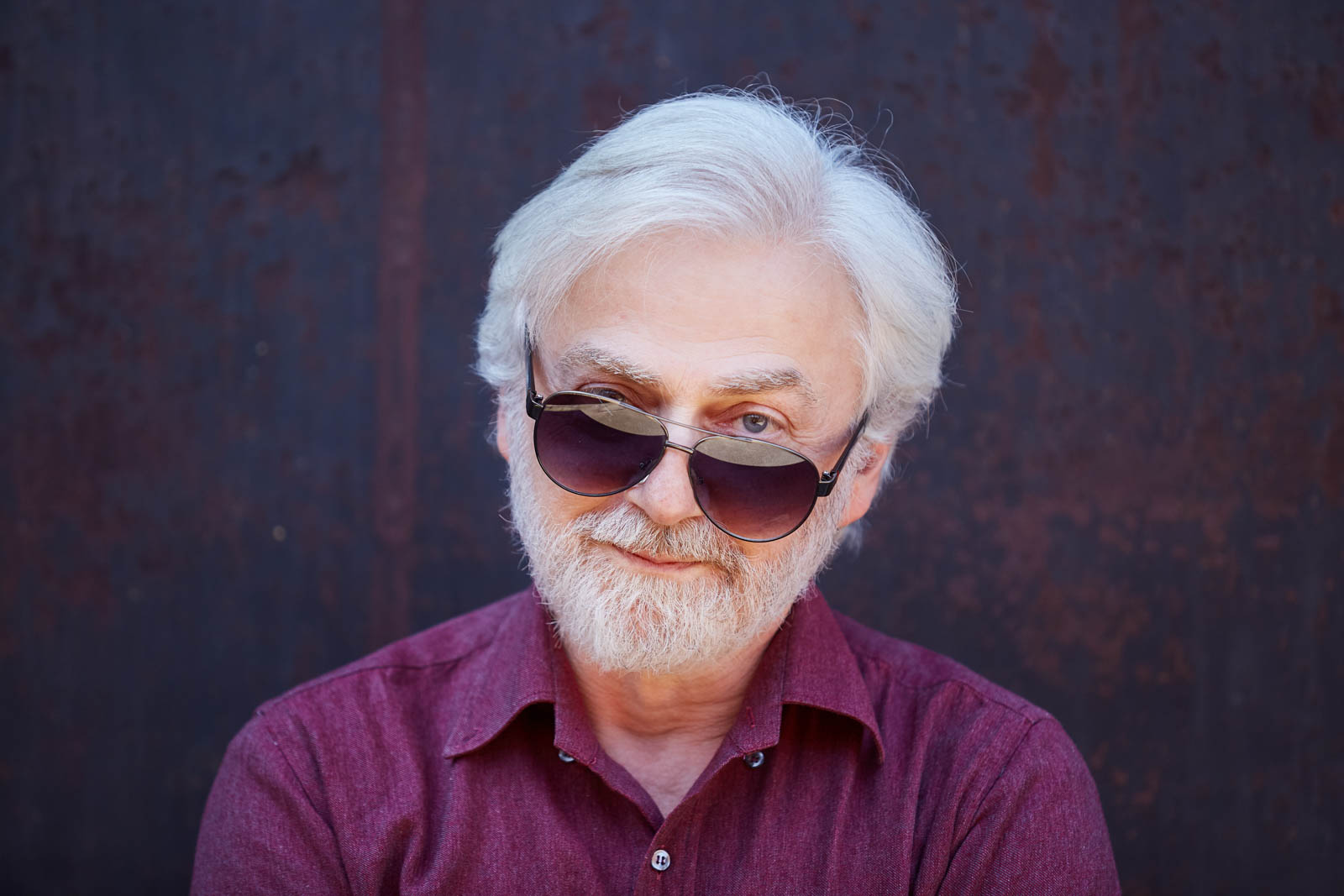
- Zimerman in 2018

Background information
- Born: 5 December 1956 (age 69); Zabrze, Poland
- Genre: Classical
- Occupations: Pianist, conductor, pedagogue
- Instrument: Piano

Krystian Zimerman (born 5 December 1956) is a Polish concert pianist, conductor and pedagogue who has been described as one of the greatest pianists of his generation. In 1975, he won the IX International Chopin Piano Competition.

Following the success at the Chopin Piano Competition, he began his collaboration with the Berlin Philharmonic and has since performed with leading orchestras around the world as well as many prominent conductors such as Leonard Bernstein, Pierre Boulez, Herbert von Karajan, Claudio Abbado and Simon Rattle. He is especially known for his performances of compositions by Mozart, Chopin, Brahms and Beethoven. He is also the recipient of many awards and honours including Léonie Sonning Music Prize (1994), Legion of Honour (2005), Order of Polonia Restituta (2013) and Praemium Imperiale (2022).

== Biography ==
Zimerman was born in Zabrze, Katowice Voivodeship, Polish People's Republic, and started to play the piano at the age of five encouraged by his father, who was also a pianist. He studied at the Karol Szymanowski Academy of Music in Katowice under Andrzej Jasiński. In 1973, he won top prize at the Ludwig van Beethoven International Piano Competition in Hradec Králové, Czechoslovakia. His international career was launched when he won the 1975 Warsaw International Chopin Piano Competition. He performed with the Berlin Philharmonic in 1976, conducted by Herbert Blomstedt. Arthur Rubinstein invited him to Paris to work with him, which led to a friendship and mentorship that lasted until Rubinstein's death in 1982. Zimerman debuted in the United States with the New York Philharmonic in 1979. He has toured widely and made a number of recordings. Since 1996, he has taught piano at the Music Academy in Basel, Switzerland. In 1999, Zimerman created the Polish Festival Orchestra to commemorate the 150th anniversary of Frédéric Chopin's death.

Zimerman is best known for his interpretations of Romantic music, but has performed a wide variety of classical pieces and is a supporter of contemporary music. Witold Lutosławski wrote his Piano Concerto for Zimerman, who has recorded it twice. Among his best-known recordings are the concerti of Grieg and Schumann with Herbert von Karajan; the Brahms concerti with Leonard Bernstein; the piano concerti of Chopin, one recording conducted by Carlo Maria Giulini and a later one conducted by himself at the keyboard; the Third, Fourth and Fifth Piano Concertos of Beethoven under Bernstein (Zimerman himself led the Vienna Philharmonic from the keyboard in Beethoven's First and Second Concertos); the first and second piano concerti of Rachmaninoff; the piano concerti of Liszt with Seiji Ozawa, the piano concerti of Ravel with Pierre Boulez, and solo piano works by Chopin, Liszt, Debussy and Schubert. In 2006, Zimerman recorded Brahms' Piano Concerto No. 1 with the Berlin Philharmonic conducted by Sir Simon Rattle (DG 477 5413; Limited Edition DG 477 6021).

Zimerman has collaborated with conductors and artists such as Claudio Abbado, Daniel Barenboim, Leonard Bernstein, Pierre Boulez, Charles Dutoit, Carlo Maria Giulini, Bernard Haitink, Herbert von Karajan, Kirill Kondrashin, Erich Leinsdorf, Lorin Maazel, Zubin Mehta, Riccardo Muti, Seiji Ozawa, Simon Rattle, Esa-Pekka Salonen, Giuseppe Sinopoli, Stanisław Skrowaczewski and Wolfgang Sawallisch.

== Criticism of US policy ==
On 26 April 2009, Zimerman vowed to his audience at Los Angeles's Walt Disney Concert Hall that, in protest at America's placement of a missile defense shield in Poland, this would be his final appearance in the United States. He had made a similar comment in 2006, stating he would not return until George W. Bush was out of office. As of October 2026 he has not made any further appearances in the United States. In incidents in 2001 and 2006, one of his Steinway pianos was completely destroyed and another one damaged by security staff at New York JFK airport.

== Personal life ==
In 1981, Zimerman moved to Röschenz in the canton of Basel-Landschaft, Switzerland, where he also became a Swiss citizen with Röschenz as his place of origin. According to conflicting sources, he's still living in Röschenz, or in Binningen, also near Basel. He married Maria (née Drygajło), a violinist, with whom he has two children: Klaudia and Ryszard. He divides his time among family, concerts, and performances of chamber music. Zimerman is an editor of the piano music of Władysław Szpilman for Boosey & Hawkes.

== Selected awards and honours ==
- 1st Prize at the Voivod-wide Prokofiev Competition (1974; Poland)
- 1st Prize at the IX International Chopin Piano Competition (1975; Poland)
- Accademia Musicale Chigiana Award (1985; Italy)
- Léonie Sonning Music Prize (1994; Denmark)
- Honorary doctor of the Karol Szymanowski Academy of Music in Katowice (2005; Poland)
- National Order of the Legion of Honour (2005; France)
- Gold Medal for Merit to Culture – Gloria Artis (2010; Poland)
- Commander's Cross with Star of the Order of Polonia Restituta (2013; Poland)
- Diapason d'Or (2015; France)
- Honorary doctor of the Fryderyk Chopin University of Music in Warsaw (2015; Poland)
- Praemium Imperiale (2022; Japan)
- Gramophone Classical Music Award (2023; UK) – Piano Category (Szymanowski Piano Works)

== Discography ==
Most of Zimerman's recordings have been released by Deutsche Grammophon, with which he has an exclusive lifelong contract.

=== Studio albums ===
Date of Release	Date of Recording	Album Details	Collaborating Artists	Record Label	Catalogue No.
1975		Chopin: Piano Concerto No. 1	Jerzy Maksymiuk conducting Polish Radio Symphony Orchestra	Polskie Nagrania Muza	
1977		Chopin: Andante spianato and Grande Polonaise & other piano works		Deutsche Grammophon	2530 826
1978		Chopin: 14 Waltzes		Deutsche Grammophon	2530 965
1978	January 1978	Mozart: Piano Sonatas KV280, 281, 311 & 330		Deutsche Grammophon	2531 052
1979		Mozart: Violin Sonatas KV 547, 404 & 481	Kaja Danczowska (violin)	Wifon	
1979	November 1978	Chopin: Piano Concerto No. 1	Carlo Maria Giulini conducting Los Angeles Philharmonic	Deutsche Grammophon	2531 125
1980	November 1979	Chopin: Piano Concerto No. 2	Carlo Maria Giulini conducting Los Angeles Philharmonic	Deutsche Grammophon	2531 126
1980	June 1979	Brahms: Piano Sonatas No. 1 & 2		Deutsche Grammophon	2531 252
1981	July 1980	Franck: Violin Sonata / Szymanowski: Mythes	Kaja Danczowska (violin)	Deutsche Grammophon	431 469-2
1982	September 1981	Schumann: Piano Concerto, Op. 54; Grieg: Piano Concerto, Op. 16	Berlin Philharmonic (conducted by Herbert von Karajan)	Deutsche Grammophon	439 015-2
1983		Brahms: Piano Sonata No.3; Scherzo, Op. 4; Balladen, Op. 10		Deutsche Grammophon	423 401-2
1984	November 1983	Brahms: Piano Concerto No. 1	Vienna Philharmonic (conducted by Leonard Bernstein)	Deutsche Grammophon	431 207-2
1985	October 1984	Brahms: Piano Concerto No. 2	Vienna Philharmonic (conducted by Leonard Bernstein)	Deutsche Grammophon	415 359-2
1986		Chopin: Piano Concerto No. 1	Kyrill Kondrashin conducting Royal Concertgebouw Orchestra	Deutsche Grammophon	419 054-2
1988	April 1987	Liszt: Piano Concerto No. 1 & 2, Totentanz	Seiji Ozawa conducting Boston Symphony Orchestra	Deutsche Grammophon	423 571-2
1988	July 1987	Chopin: 4 Ballades; Barcarolle, Op. 60; Fantasie in F minor, Op. 49		Deutsche Grammophon	423 090-2
1989	July 1988	Strauss: Violin Sonata, Op. 18 / Respighi: Violin Sonata	Kyung-Wha Chung (violin)	Deutsche Grammophon	457 907-2
1991	February 1990	Schubert: Impromptus D.899 & D.935		Deutsche Grammophon	423 612-2
1991	March 1991	Liszt: Sonata in B minor & other piano works (Nuages Gris, La Notte, La Lugubre Gondola, Funérailles)		Deutsche Grammophon	431 780-2
1992	November 1989 & March 1990	Lutosławski: Piano Concerto, Chain 3, Novelette	BBC Symphony Orchestra (conducted by Witold Lutosławski)	Deutsche Grammophon	431 664-2
1992	September 1989	Beethoven: Piano Concerto No. 3 & 4	Leonard Bernstein conducting Vienna Philharmonic	Deutsche Grammophon	429 749-2
1992	September 1989	Beethoven: Piano Concerto No. 5 "Emperor"	Leonard Bernstein conducting Vienna Philharmonic	Deutsche Grammophon	429 748-2
1992	December 1991	Beethoven: Piano Concerto No. 1 & 2	Himself conducting Vienna Philharmonic	Deutsche Grammophon	437 545-2
1994	August 1991	Debussy: Preludes		Deutsche Grammophon	435 773-2
1998	November 1994 (Tracks 1–11); July 1996 (Track 12)	Ravel: Piano Concerto in G major, Valses Nobles et Sentimentales, Concerto for the Left Hand in D major	The Cleveland Orchestra (Tracks 1–11); London Symphony Orchestra (Track 12) (conducted by Pierre Boulez)	Deutsche Grammophon	449 213-2
1999	August 1999	Chopin: Piano Concerto No. 1 & 2	Himself conducting Polish Festival Orchestra	Deutsche Grammophon	459 684-2
2003	December 1997 (No.1); December 2000 (No.2)	Rachmaninoff: Piano Concerto No. 1 & 2	Boston Symphony Orchestra (conducted by Seiji Ozawa)	Deutsche Grammophon	459 643-2
2005	November 2001	Bartók: Piano Concerto No. 1	Chicago Symphony Orchestra (conducted by Pierre Boulez)	Deutsche Grammophon	477 5330
2006	September 2003	Brahms: Piano Concerto No. 1	Berliner Philharmonic (conducted by Sir Simon Rattle)	Deutsche Grammophon	477 5413
2011	February 2009	Bacewicz: Piano Sonata No. 2, Quintets Nos. 1 & 2	Kaja Danczowska (violin); Agata Szymczewska (violin); Ryszard Groblewski (viola); Rafal Kwiatkowski (cello)	Deutsche Grammophon	477 8351
2015	February 2013	Lutoslawski: Piano Concerto (1987–88), Symphony No. 2 (1965 -67)	Berliner Philharmonic (conducted by Sir Simon Rattle)	Deutsche Grammophon	479 4518
2017	September 2016	Schubert: Piano Sonatas D.959 & D.960		Deutsche Grammophon	479 7588
2018	June 2018	Bernstein: Symphony No. 2 "The Age of Anxiety"	Berliner Philharmonic (conducted by Sir Simon Rattle)	Deutsche Grammophon	483 5539
2021	July 2021	Beethoven: Complete Piano Concertos	London Symphony Orchestra (conducted by Sir Simon Rattle)	Deutsche Grammophon	483 9971
2022	September 2022	Szymanowski: Piano Works		Deutsche Grammophon	486 3007
2025		Brahms: Piano Quartets Nos. 2 & 3	Maria Nowak (violin); Katarzyna Budnik (viola); Yuya Okamoto (cello)	Deutsche Grammophon	486 4650

=== Live albums ===
Date of issue	Date of recording	Cover art	Album details	Collaborating artists	Record label	Catalogue no.
1977			Beethoven: Piano Sonata No. 8, Op. 13 "Pathétique"; Prokofiev: Piano Sonata No.3, Op.28; Bacewicz: Piano Sonata No.2		Polskie Nagrania Muza	
1986			Chopin: Piano Concerto No. 1 (recorded in 1979)	Kyrill Kondrashin conducting Royal Concertgebouw Orchestra	Deutsche Grammophon	
2021			Beethoven complete Piano Concertos	London Symphony Orchestra conducted by Sir Simon Rattle	Deutsche Grammophon	

=== Video releases ===
Date of issue	Date of filming	Video details	Collaborating artists	Record label	Catalogue no.
1984	1983	Brahms: Piano Concerto No. 1	Leonard Bernstein conducting Vienna Philharmonic	Deutsche Grammophon	
1985	1984	Brahms: Piano Concerto No. 2	Leonard Bernstein conducting Vienna Philharmonic	Deutsche Grammophon	
2007	1989 (No. 3-5), 1991 (No.1-2)	Beethoven: The Piano Concertos	Leonard Bernstein conducting Vienna Philharmonic	Deutsche Grammophon	
2008	1987	Chopin: 4 Ballades, Fantasie, Barcarolle, Scherzo No. 2 / Schubert: 4 Impromptus Op. 90		Deutsche Grammophon	
2008	1986	Bernstein: Symphony No. 2	Leonard Bernstein conducting Vienna Philharmonic	Deutsche Grammophon	
