= Piano Concerto (Lutosławski) =

1988 composition by Witold Lutosławski

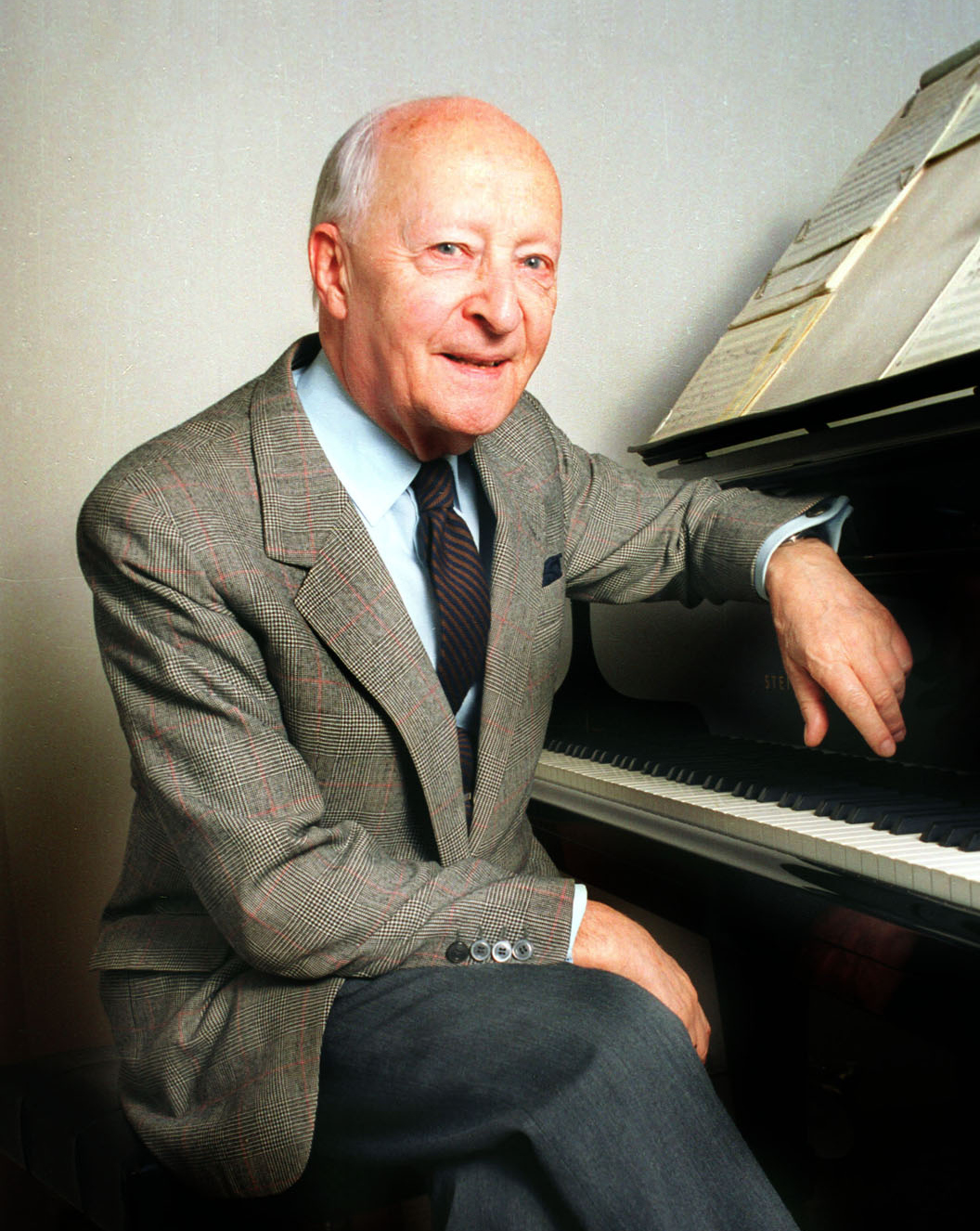
Witold Lutosławski in 1992

The Concerto for Piano and Orchestra is a composition for solo piano and orchestra by the Polish composer Witold Lutosławski. The music was commissioned by the Salzburg Festival. It was first performed at the festival on August 19, 1988 by the pianist Krystian Zimerman and the Austrian Radio Orchestra under the direction of the composer. Lutosławski dedicated the piece to Zimerman.

== Composition ==
=== Structure ===
The concerto has a duration of roughly 27 minutes and is cast in four movements played without pause. The first movement comprises four sections, the first and third of which Lutosławski described as possessing "nonchalant" motifs. Conversely, he described the movement's second and fourth sections as "filled with a broad cantilena, finally leading to the highpoint of the whole movement."

The composer called the second movement a "'moto perpetuo,' a quick 'chase' by the piano against the background of the orchestra which ends by calmly subsiding in preparation for the third movement."

The third movement begins with a recitative for the soloist, out of which a largo theme develops. The orchestra is introduced later in the movement, contrasting the beginning with "moments of a more sudden, dramatic character." Finally, the orchestra again subsides and the cantilena returns, being performed by the soloist alone.

The structure of the fourth movement alludes to a Baroque chaconne. Its theme is played by the orchestra and repeated several times while the pianist presents different episodes. The two ideas are cast in a "chain-form" and thus do not begin or end concurrently until near the end of the movement. A shortened version of the theme is played by the orchestra one last time before a brief piano recitative and coda "presto" conclude the piece.

=== Instrumentation ===
The work is scored for a solo piano and a large orchestra consisting of three flutes (doubling piccolo), three oboes, three clarinets (doubling E♭ clarinet and bass clarinet), three bassoons (doubling contrabassoon), four horns, two trumpets, three trombones, tuba, timpani, three percussionists, harp, and strings.

== Reception ==
The piano concerto has been praised by musicians and critics alike, many of whom have considered it to be one of the finest piano concertos of the 20th century.

Richard Fairman of the Financial Times described the work as "elusive and restless" and "like a siren luring the inquisitive listener." He added, "Nothing is obvious in this airborne music, as its ideas gather and disperse at speed, like swarming insects, only touching the ground in the last few minutes." Andrew Achenbach of Gramophone said the piece "serves up a wealth of a succinct, characteristically deft and urgently communicative invention in four linked movements, while consciously harking back to figures from the past (in this instance Bartók, Szymanowski and Prokofiev)." Anthony Tommasini of The New York Times wrote, "With its large, sweeping gestures and dramatic interplay between the soloist and the orchestra, the piano concerto pays homage to this most popular of concert music genres. Yet even while writing a public piece hardly less accessible than the concertos of Prokofiev, Lutoslawski finds ingenious ways to make the music fresh, original and intellectually challenging."

Andrew Clements of The Guardian said it "ranks alongside Ligeti's utterly different concerto as the most important for piano and orchestra since Bartók." The pianists Leif Ove Andsnes and Louis Lortie have similarly considered it to be one of the great piano concertos of the late 20th century. Lortie said of the piece, "I like it because Lutoslawski isn't trying to go against the nature of the instrument, the way some modern composers do. Lutoslawski was a fine pianist himself, and I think he wanted to create something he himself would enjoy playing."

== See also ==
- List of compositions by Witold Lutosławski
