= Variations on a Theme by Paganini (Lutosławski) =

1941 composition by Witold Lutosławski

- by Witold Lutosławski
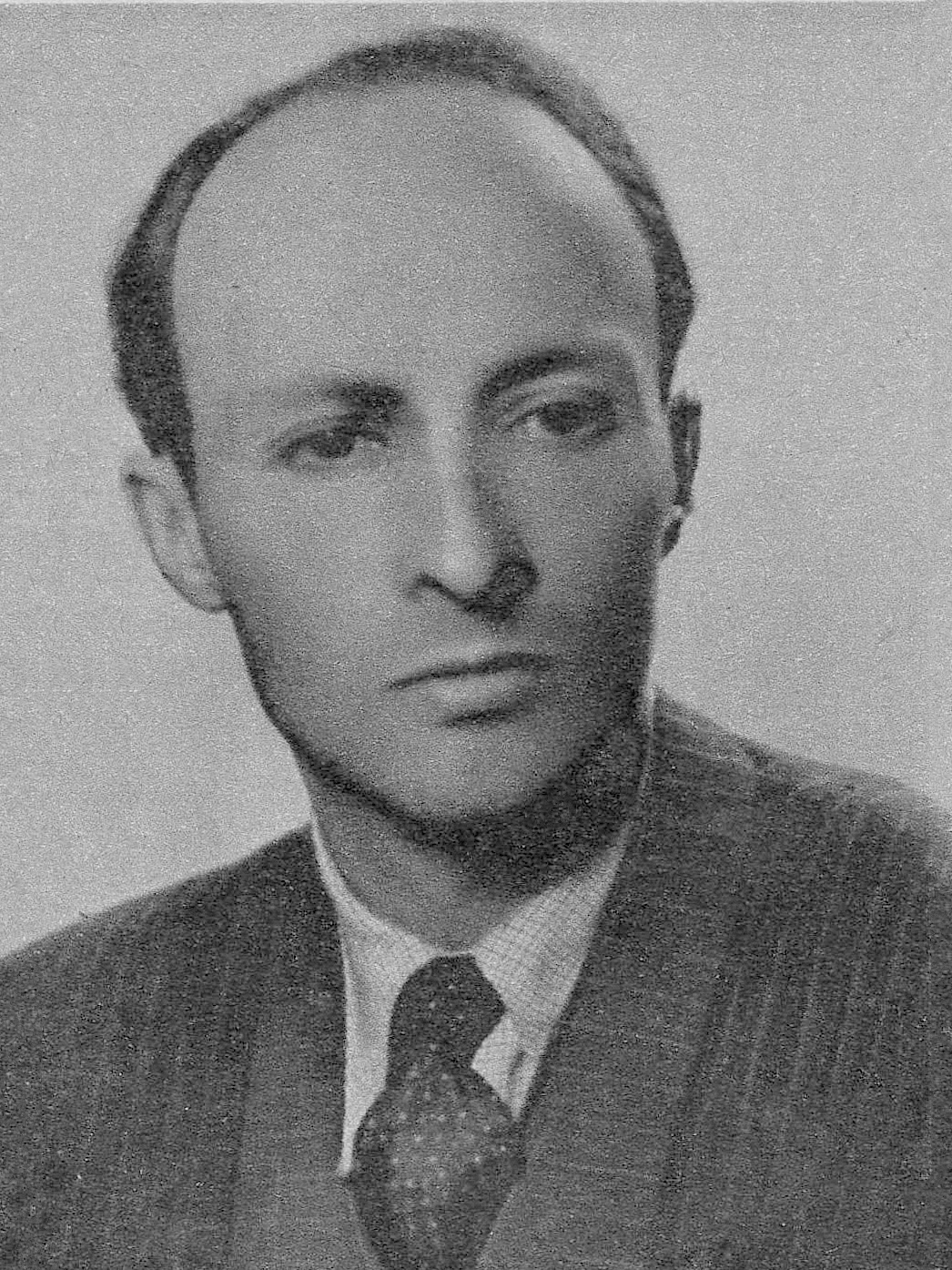
- Witold Lutosławski in the 1940s
- Key: A minor
- Form: Theme and variations
- Composed: 1941 — Warsaw
- Scoring: Two pianos

Variations on a Theme by Paganini (Polish: Wariacje na temat Paganiniego), often referred to as the Paganini Variations, is an arrangement for two pianos of Niccolò Paganini's Caprice No. 24, from Paganini's original set of 24 Caprices for violin, written by Polish composer Witold Lutosławski. The arrangement, originally composed in 1941, was later re-arranged for piano and orchestra.

== Background ==
=== Version for two pianos (1941) ===
In the years leading up to Lutosławski's completion of this piece, the composer was a minor officer in the Polish Army when Poland was invaded in the events prior to World War II, by the Soviets from the East and the Nazis from every other direction. After escaping from his initial capture, he fled on foot more than four hundred kilometers towards his home in Warsaw, which rendered him without an official identity until the end of the war. After some time performing in small cafés to make his living, as Germans had banned public concerts, he and fellow pianist Andrzej Panufnik formed a piano duo, performing in a few popular nightclubs, where Lutosławski arranged more than two hundred pieces for two pianos. However, a few years later, by the time the Warsaw Uprising had broken out, both pianists had left the capital, taking only essentials.

Out of the two hundred arrangements Lutosławski wrote during the years prior to that event, the Variations was the only surviving composition, all the rest of them presumably ending up destroyed. This arrangement was written with Lutosławski himself at the first piano and Panufnik at the second piano, although Panufnik never claimed to have been in the creation process. The arrangement was later published by PWM Edition and Chester Music.

=== Version for piano and orchestra (1977–1978) ===
Lutosławski rearranged the piece for piano and orchestra many years later, between 1977 and 1978, and dedicated the new arrangement to Felicja Blumental. The premiere took place in Miami on November 18, 1979, with the Florida Philharmonic Orchestra, conductor Brian Priestman and Blumental herself at the piano. This re-arrangement was also published by PWM Edition and Chester Music.

== Structure ==
The Variations retain most of Paganini's original material for solo violin. As Paganini's original composition, it is structured as a theme with variations, presenting the theme, a total of twelve variations, and a final coda. The additional twelfth variation before the coda is Lutosławski's only structural alteration in the piece. It is in a single, 208-bar movement with a total duration of six minutes. It was originally scored for two pianos. No titles for any of the sections are present in the score; however, these sections are divided by double bar lines except for Variation X and the coda. The sections are divided as follows:

Structure of Variations on a Theme by Paganini
Section	Tempo indication	Bar (Note: This includes repetitions.)
Theme	Allegro capriccioso	1
Variation I	—	19
Variation II	Meno mosso	31
Variation III	—	47
Variation IV	—	59
Variation V	—	75
Variation VI	Poco lento	91
Variation VII	Allegro molto	104
Variation VIII	—	118
Variation IX	—	130
Variation X	—	142
Variation XI	Più mosso	174
Variation XII	Ancora più mosso	186
Coda	Ancora più mosso	202

The Variations follow Paganini's classical variation model, but incorporates some of the techniques that were popular at the time of its completion: polytonality, parallel fifths, and tritones. These techniques are even present in the opening theme, while variations I and II introduce a light contrapuntal style. Variation III ensues with a heavier presence of tritones and parallel motion, with an F♯ at the end, leading into Variation IV with a deceptive cadence. Variation IV again presents a dense counterpoint, while Variation V's counterpoint is not as dense and features the main melody in both piano parts.

After a short pause, Variation VI, a slow, contrapuntal variation, ensues. It is isolated from the other variations because of its sharp change in tempo. The variation's form is that of a strict canon by inversion in both piano parts throughout the whole section.

Variation VII introduces a faster tempo again in a two-bar lead-up section, acting as a bridge, with a short motif which is going to be repeated and elaborated until the end of Variation VIII. The triplet motor used in these two variations is reduced to dyads in Variations IX and X. However, Variation X is notable for augmenting the theme to make it last twice as long in order to reduce the momentum that has been building since Variation VI. Variation XI employs a whole-tone scale. At the end of the piece, Lutosławski diverts from Paganini's coda and adds a new variation presenting the main theme again in augmented form to serve as recapitulation. After that, Paganini's original coda is reinstated.

The 1978 version for piano and orchestra follows the same variation structure as the original two piano version, with most variations repeated so that the piano and orchestra can exchange playing the Piano 1 or Piano 2 part. It is 9 minutes long and scored for piano solo and an orchestra made up of two flutes (second doubling piccolo), two oboes, two clarinets in B-flat, two bassoons (second doubling contrabassoon), four horns in F, three trumpets in C, three trombones, a tuba, timpani, a percussion section made up of a xylophone, a glockenspiel, a marimba, bells, and a vibraphone without motor, a harp, and a standard string section.

== Other arrangements ==
Polish composer Marta Ptaszyńska also re-arranged this composition for two pianos and percussion. This version was published by PWM Edition.

== See also ==
- List of variations on a theme by another composer
