= Symphony No. 3 (Lutosławski) =

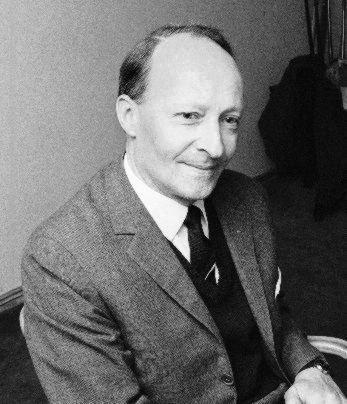
Lutosławski during his visit to Finland, 10 March 1965

Witold Lutosławski wrote his Symphony No. 3 in 1973–1983. The Chicago Symphony Orchestra, conducted by Georg Solti, gave the world premiere on 29 September 1983.

The work is dedicated to Solti and the Chicago Symphony Orchestra. It was awarded the Nagroda Solidarności by the Independent Culture Committee in 1984 and selected for the first Grawemeyer Award for Music Composition in 1985.

== Analysis ==
A page from the score of the symphony.

Many passages in the Symphony no. 3 employ Lutosławski's by-then well developed technique which he called "limited aleatorism", in which the individual players in the orchestra are each asked to play their phrase or repeated fragment in their own time — rhythmically independent from the other musicians. During these passages very little synchronisation is specified: events that are coordinated include the simultaneous entrances of groups of instruments, the abrupt end of some episodes, and some transitions to new sections. By this method the composer retains control of the symphony's architecture and the realisation of the performance, while simultaneously creating complex and somewhat unpredictable polyphony.

At the beginning of the illustrated page from the score, for instance, the woodwinds and brass (notated at the top of the page) are playing short repeated passages. The composer specifies completely the music for each player, leaving the interpretation to the individuals: only the co-ordination between the parts is unspecified. The strings (notated at the bottom of the page) join the texture by sections: first the violins, then the violas, the cellos and lastly the basses, all playing rapid repeating figures. The string players do not coordinate their playing (even within sections) except for their entries. These entries are indicated by the conductor, as instructed by the down-arrows above the string parts.

Other parts of the symphony (the very beginning and the very end, for example) call for rhythmic synchronization of the orchestra, and are notated more traditionally.

== Instrumentation ==
The symphony calls for a large orchestra, consisting of:

Woodwinds

3 flutes (two doubling piccolo)
3 oboes (third doubling cor anglais)
3 clarinets (one doubling E♭ clarinet, another doubling bass clarinet)
3 bassoons (third doubling contrabassoon)

Brass

4 horns
4 trumpets
4 trombones
1 tuba

Percussion

timpani

xylophone
glockenspiel
marimba
vibraphone (without motor)
bells
5 tom-toms
2 bongos
bass drum
side drum
tenor drum
3 cymbals (small, medium and large)
tam-tams (high and low)
tambourine

Keyboards

celesta
piano (four hands)

Strings

2 harps

violins I
violins II
violas
cellos
double basses

== Recordings ==
Orchestra	Conductor	Record Company	Year of Recording	Catalog #
Berlin Philharmonic Orchestra	Witold Lutosławski	Philips Records	1985	464 043-2
Los Angeles Philharmonic Orchestra	Esa-Pekka Salonen	Sony Classical	1985	SK66280
Polish National Radio Symphony Orchestra	Witold Lutosławski	CD Accord	1992	ACD 015
Chicago Symphony Orchestra	Daniel Barenboim	Erato Records	1992	91711-2
Polish National Radio Symphony Orchestra	Antoni Wit	Naxos Records	1995	8.553423
BBC National Orchestra of Wales	Tadaaki Otaka	BIS Records	1995	CD743
Silesian Philharmonic Symphony Orchestra	Miroslaw Blaszczyk	Dux	2005	0506
BBC Symphony Orchestra	Edward Gardner	Chandos	2010	CHSA 5082
Finnish Radio Symphony Orchestra	Hannu Lintu	Ondine	2020	ODE 1332-5

The first recording was awarded the Grammophone Contemporary Award 1986 and the Koussevitzky Prix Mondial du Disque (Paris 1986).
