= Symphony No. 4 (Lutosławski) =

Symphony composed by Witold Lutosławski

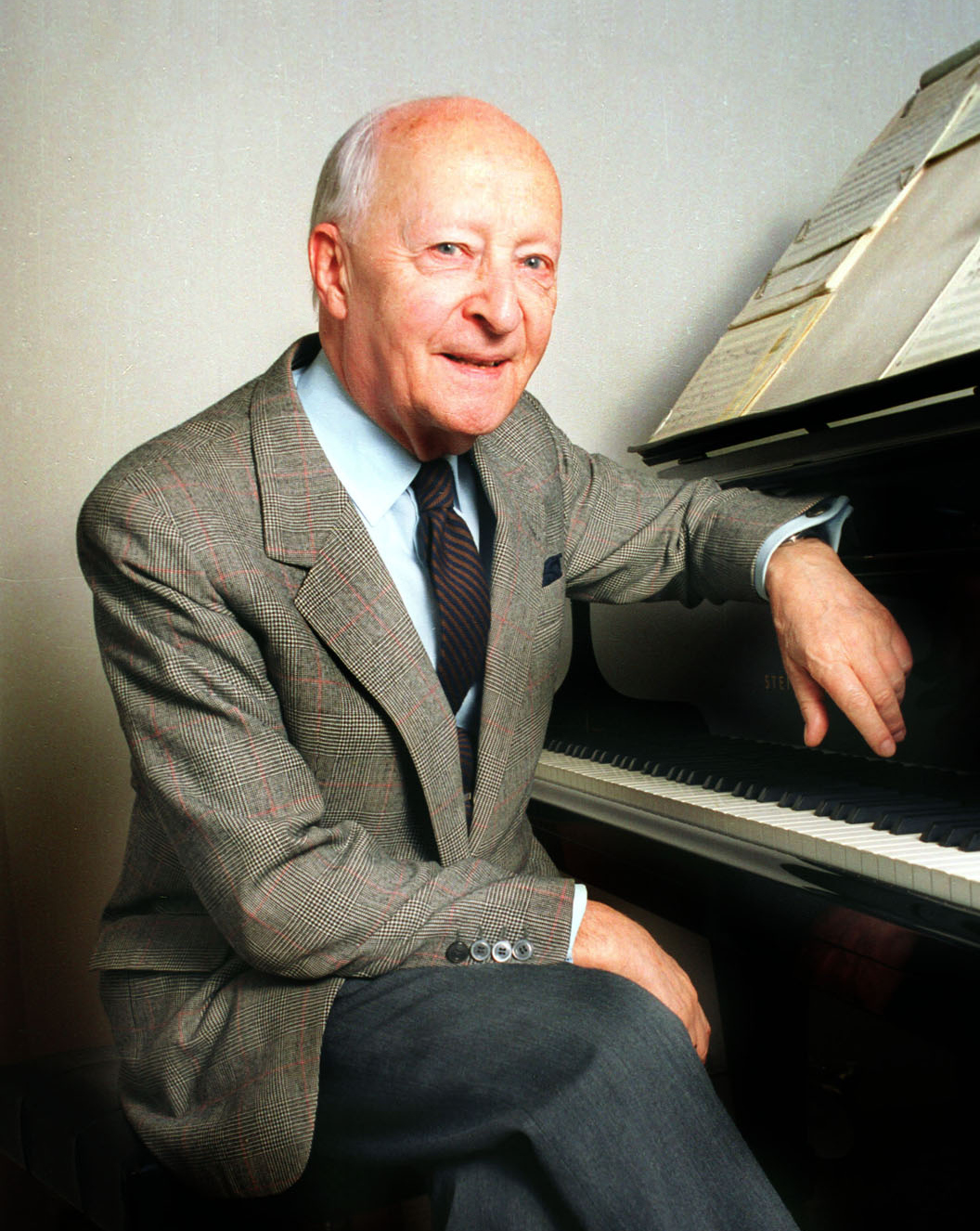
Witold Lutosławski in 1992

Polish composer Witold Lutosławski wrote his Symphony No. 4 in 1988–92, completing it on 22 August 1992. The symphony, lasting 20–25 minutes, is in one continuous movement embodying two sections: a preparatory section and a development section with an epilogue.

== Orchestration ==
3 flutes (3rd flute also taking piccolo), 3 oboes (3rd oboe also taking English horn), 3 clarinets (2nd also taking E♭ clarinet; 3rd clarinet also taking bass clarinet), 3 bassoons (3rd also on contrabassoon), 4 horns, 3 trumpets, 3 trombones, tuba, timpani, percussion (bass drum, bongos, chimes, glockenspiel, marimba, snare drum, suspended cymbals, tam-tam, tenor drum, tom-toms, vibraphone, xylophone), 2 harps, piano, celesta, and strings.

== World Premiere ==
The symphony received its world premiere on February 5, 1993, from the Los Angeles Philharmonic, with the composer conducting, at the Dorothy Chandler Pavilion in Los Angeles, California. It was commissioned by the Los Angeles Philharmonic with the support of Betty Freeman.

== Recordings ==
Orchestra	Conductor	Record Company	Year of Recording	Format
Warsaw National Philharmonic Orchestra	Witold Lutosławski	Polskie Nagrania Muza	1993	CD
Los Angeles Philharmonic Orchestra	Esa-Pekka Salonen	Sony Records	1993	CD
Polish National Radio Symphony Orchestra	Antoni Wit	Naxos Records	1994	CD
Los Angeles Philharmonic Orchestra	Esa-Pekka Salonen	Deutsche Grammophon	2006	Digital Download
Silesian Philharmonic Symphony Orchestra	Mirosław Jacek Błaszczyk	Dux Records	2004	CD
Saar Radio Symphony Orchestra	Roman Kofman	CPO	1995	CD
Finnish Radio Symphony Orchestra	Hannu Lintu	Ondine	2018	SACD
NDR Symphony Orchestra	Krzysztof Urbański	Alpha	2016	CD
