= Symphony No. 1 (Lutosławski) =

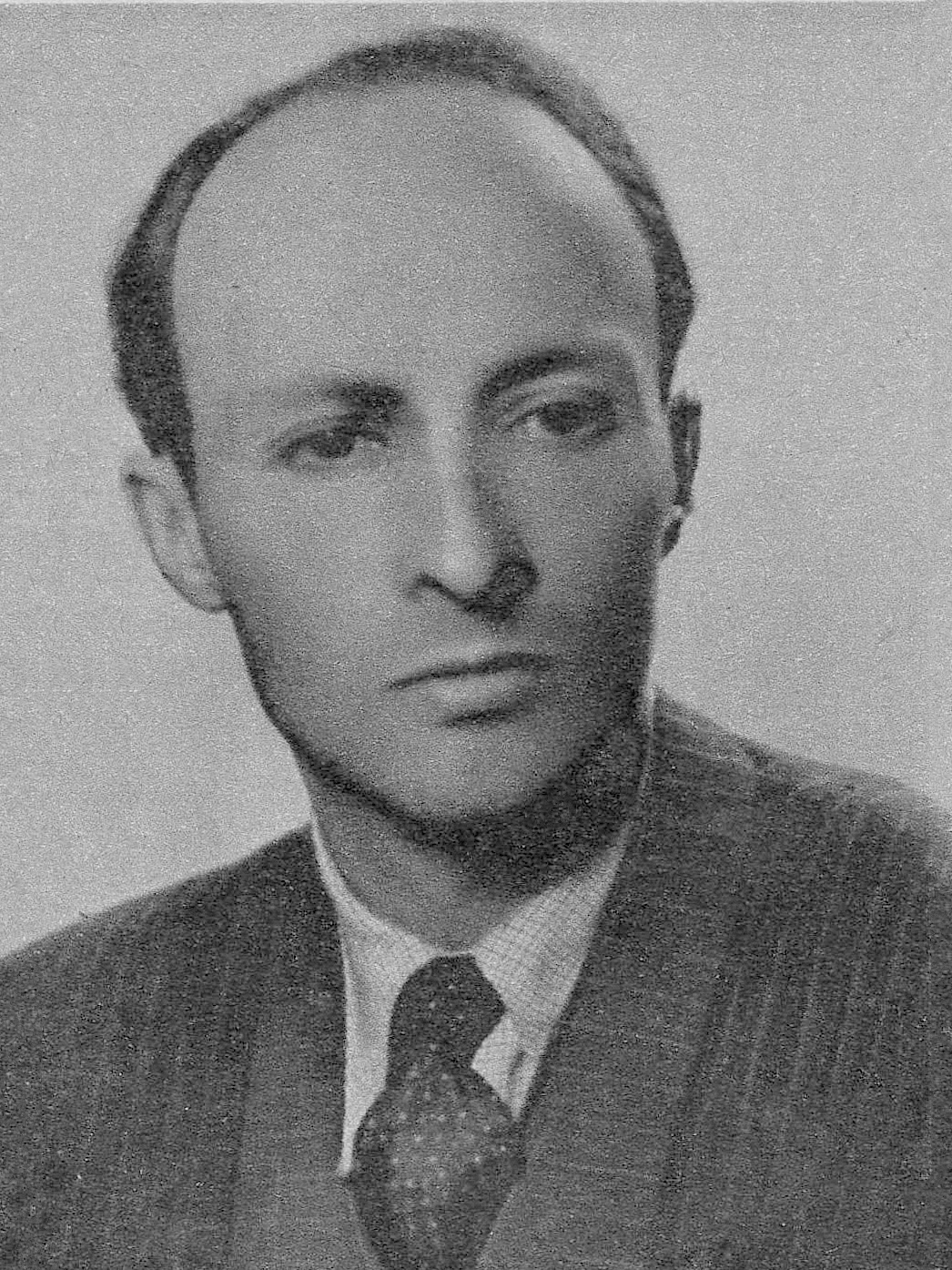
Witold Lutosławski in 1946

Polish composer Witold Lutosławski wrote his Symphony No. 1 in 1941–47. The Grand Symphony Orchestra of the Polish Radio (WOSPR) performed its world premiere (conducted by Grzegorz Fitelberg, to whom it was dedicated) in Katowice on April 1, 1948.

== Music ==
The symphony, lasting 25 minutes, and is in four movements. The first, Allegro giusto, is a sonata form. The second is marked Poco adagio, while the third (Allegretto misterioso) is a scherzo whose opening theme is based on a twelve-note tone-row. The final movement is marked Allegro vivace.

It is scored for an orchestra with the following instrumentation.

Woodwinds
2 piccolos
flute
2 oboes
English horn
3 clarinets, 2nd doubling on piccolo clarinet in E♭
2 bassoons
contrabassoon

Brass
4 horns in F
3 trumpets in C
3 trombones
tuba

Percussion
timpani
drum
cymbals
xylophone

Keyboards
piano

Strings
harp
violins I and II
violas
cellos
double basses

== Analysis ==
"Witold Lutosławski: Symphony No. 1"
