= Musique funèbre =

1958 composition for string orchestra by Witold Lutosławski

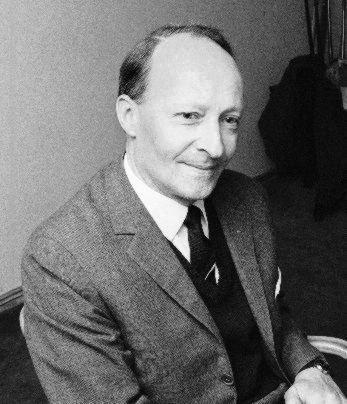
Witold Lutosławski during his visit to Finland, 10 March 1965

Musique funèbre (Polish: Muzyka żałobna; Funereal Music or Music of Mourning) is a composition for string orchestra by the Polish composer Witold Lutosławski, completed in 1958.

== History ==
Lutosławski began composing Musique funèbre in late 1954 and completed it in 1958. The piece is scored for a small string orchestra of four violins, two violas, two cellos, and two basses. Its first performance occurred on March 26, 1958 in Katowice by the National Polish Radio Orchestra under the direction of Jan Krenz, who commissioned the piece to honor its dedicatee, Béla Bartók (Harley 1998–2003). It received a notable performance later that year at the Warsaw Autumn Festival (Thomas 2005, 90). In 1959 it won both the Polish Composers' Union Prize as well as First prize from the UNESCO International Composers' Council.

Recent performances include (Anon. n.d.):

- In February 2026, it was performed by the Hallé Orchestra at Bridgewater Hall in Manchester, United Kingdom as part of a programme of performances with Jonny Greenwood and Daniel Pioro, of Jonny Greenwood and Steve Reich compositions.
- In 2014 it was performed at least twelve times in countries such as China (Hongzhou); France (Paris); Germany (Berlin, Cologne, Hamburg, Rostock); United Kingdom (London); and United States (Chicago)
- In 2013 (Lutosławski's centennial) it was performed at least twenty-nine times in fifteen countries including Austria (Vienna); Finland (Helsinki); France (Paris); Germany (Berlin, Cologne, Dresden, Erfurt, Leipzig, Munich); Japan (Tokyo); Luxemburg (Luxemburg); Mexico (Guanajuato); Netherlands (Amsterdam); Poland (Warsaw); Portugal (Belém); Slovenia (Ljubljana); Spain (Madrid); Switzerland (Lucerne, Warth-Weiningen); United Kingdom (London, England; Edinburgh, Scotland; St Asaph Cathedral, Wales); United States (Cleveland, Philadelphia)

== Structure ==
The first eight measures

The composition consists of one movement with four distinct sections marked by changes of texture and instrumentation (as opposed to four distinct movements, which are marked by double bar lines and extended periods of silence). These four distinct sections are:

1. Prologue
2. Metamorphoses
3. Apogeum
4. Epilogue

It has a duration of c. 13'30".

=== 1. Prologue ===
Typical of 20th-century music, the piece uses mixed meter, in this case beginning in 5/2 then shifting for a measure (bar) to 3/2 with a steady pulse of half-note (minim) = 88. Within such a fluid meter Lutosławski begins by presenting the principal twelve-tone idea horizontally and unambiguously in the first cello [F↑B↓B♭↑E↓E♭↓A↓A♭↑D↓D♭↓G↓G♭↑C]. Significantly, the twelve-tone row consists of only two intervals: tritones and (descending) half-steps (Thomas 2005, 97). Both of these intervals are associated with lament and funeral topics. Lutosławski initially treats the row canonically, answering this dux with a comes in the second cello, whose time interval is one beat (half-note, minim) and pitch interval is six half-steps (semitones) higher.

=== 2. Metamorphoses ===
This section features a technique that Lutosławski would later call "chain form," which also occurs in his "Passacaglia" from his Concerto for Orchestra. Chain form describes a technique in which a composer "braids" two independent strands of music. In Metamorphoses, Lutosławski braids three strands—an early example of what he would later call "chain form" (Stucky 2013). In any event, the row from the Prologue undergoes twelve transformations. The series is successively presented a fifth lower according to the circle of fifths. The texture thickens as a result of increasingly intense uses of “foreign” sounds entwining these pitches, which take on the role of a cantus firmus, with an ever-expanding range of sounds.

=== 3. Apogeum ===
Although the apogeum is relatively short, clocking in at less than one minute and consisting of a mere twelve bars, it is nevertheless structurally significant. It consists of a succession of 32 twelve-tone chords. Significantly, "It is in chords such as these that Lutosławski found the key to his future development" (Thomas 2005, 97). By this Thomas is referring to Lutosławski's future preference for writing twelve-tone chords that present systematic vertical intervallic configurations. In any event, in this piece the wide registration gradually collapses inward onto a single pitch that initiates the final section.

=== 4. Epilogue ===
The dodecaphonic canon of the first section appears in this final section. As the final movement, its canons mirror symmetrically the canons of the first movement, thus clearly honoring Bartók's preferences for such palindromic structures. The symmetry is reinforced as the canons of the final section reverse the order of the first section (Chłopecki n.d.).
