= Concerto for Orchestra (Lutosławski) =

Orchestral work by Witold Lutosławski

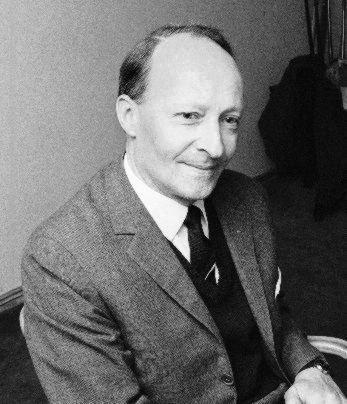
Witold Lutosławski in 1965

Polish composer Witold Lutosławski's Concerto for Orchestra was written in the years 1950–54, on the initiative of the artistic director of the Warsaw Philharmonic, Witold Rowicki, to whom it is dedicated. It is written in three movements and lasts about 30 minutes.

The concerto constitutes the last stage and a crowning achievement of the folkloristic style in Lutosławski's work. That style, inspired by the music of the Kurpie region, went back in time to the pre-1939 years. Having written a series of small folkloristic pieces for various instruments and their combinations (piano, clarinet with piano, chamber ensemble, orchestra, voice with orchestra), Lutosławski decided to use his experience of stylisation of Polish folklore in a bigger work. However, the Concerto for Orchestra differs from Lutosławski's earlier folkloristic pieces not only in that it is more extended, but also in that what is retained from folklore is only melodic themes. The composer moulds them into a different reality, lending them new harmony, adding atonal counterpoints, and turning them into neo-baroque forms.

== Music ==
The three movements are:

1. Intrada: Allegro maestoso
2. Capriccio notturno ed Arioso: Vivace
3. Passacaglia, Toccata e Corale: Andante con moto — Allegro giusto

The first movement is a sort of extended two-subject overture beginning in 9/8 on an ostinato drum beat more threatening, if anything, than that which begins the Brahms's First Symphony.

The Capriccio is an airy, virtuoso scherzo, the main subject of which is intoned by the violin, followed by the remainder of the strings and woodwinds. It is followed by an expressive Arioso initiated by the brass section. The reprisal of the capriccio is intoned by the cellos and harp, the theme bowed, then with pizzicato. It is concluded with the ominous rumblings of the drums, double-basses and bass clarinet.

The last movement is in three sections: the Passacaglia being a set of variations on a brooding theme played by the double-basses; followed by a vivacious and dynamic Toccata; and the (instrumental) Corale. The Corale's second appearance produces a solemn finale for the monumental construction, the material for which is borrowed from a nineteenth-century collection compiled by the Polish ethnologist Oskar Kolberg. The concerto finishes with a dramatic flourish and climax from the whole orchestra.

=== Instrumentation ===
The score calls for a large orchestra consisting of the following instruments.

Woodwinds

3 flutes (two doubling piccolo)
3 oboes (one doubling cor anglais)
3 clarinets (one doubling bass clarinet)
3 bassoons (one doubling contrabassoon)

Brass

4 horns
4 trumpets
4 trombones
1tuba

Percussion

timpani

snare drum
tenor drum
bass drum
cymbals
tambourine
tam-tam
xylophone
bells

Keyboards

celesta
piano

Strings

2 harps

violins I
violins II
violas
cellos
double basses

== Performance history ==
The work was first performed in Warsaw on 26 November 1954, and was responsible for making Lutosławski's name recognised in the West. However, once Lutosławski embarked on a style marked by heavy aleatoricism in the early 1960s, he attempted to distance himself from the Concerto for Orchestra, though he conducted it in Copenhagen in August 1967 upon receiving a $10,000 prize from a Danish foundation.
