= Jeux vénitiens =

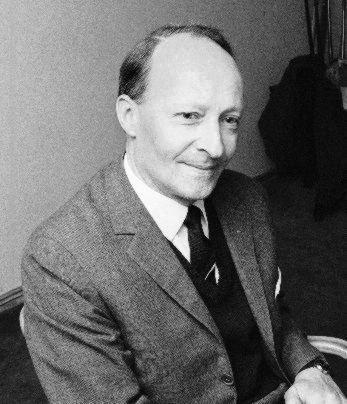
Witold Lutosławski during his visit to Finland, 10 March 1965

Jeux vénitiens (French for Venetian Games) is a 1961 composition by Polish composer Witold Lutosławski, under commission from the Krakow Philharmonic. It premiered April 24, 1961 in Venice. Another performance occurred at Warsaw Autumn in 1961.

== Music ==
Inspired by John Cage, Jeux vénitiens is notable for its use of limited aleatory techniques. In the piece, Lutosławski determined the overall form and harmonic boundaries, yet he left the realization of the exact contrapuntal and harmonic details up to chance in performance. The indeterminate character produces aleatoric counterpoint, which is a type of sound mass.

The score of the first movement contains eight boxed musical events labeled A-B-C-D-E-F-G-H. Sections A, C, E, and G function as a refrain. Four percussion instruments signal the beginning of these sections, which are composed of lively un-metered lines played by woodwinds. Each subsequent refrain adds instrumentation. Thus, section C utilizes woodwinds and 3 timpani; section E utilizes woodwinds, 3 timpani, and 3 brass instruments; and section G utilizes woodwinds, 3 timpani, 3 brass instruments, and piano. Except for section E, each subsequent refrain adds duration in multiples of 6 seconds. Thus, the durations for each section are: A-12″, C-18″, E-6″, and G-24″.

Sections B, D, F, and H function as contrasting interludes. Similar to the refrains, percussion instruments signal the beginning of these sections, which are composed of static soft string clusters.

Another notable feature of this composition is Lutosławski's hallmark use of a twelve-tone chord. Lutosławski's twelve-tone chords are symmetrical and often use a limited number of intervals. For example, the woodwind pitches of section A contain 12 notes (two symmetrical hexachords) and exhibit the following intervallic structure from bottom to top, expressed as intervals (in semitones): 23222 / 5 / 22232. Thus, such aleatoric counterpoint produces a special type of sound mass in which the full chromatic spectrum is not covered. Rather than a tone cluster, listeners can hear the twelve-tone chords as a symmetrically spaced chord. (Roig-Francoli 2008, 287–91)

== Sources ==
- Roig-Francoli, Miguel (2008). Understanding Post-Tonal Music (First ed.). New York: McGraw-Hill. pp. 287–292. ISBN 9780072936247.
