= Witold Lutosławski =

Polish composer and conductor (1913–1994)

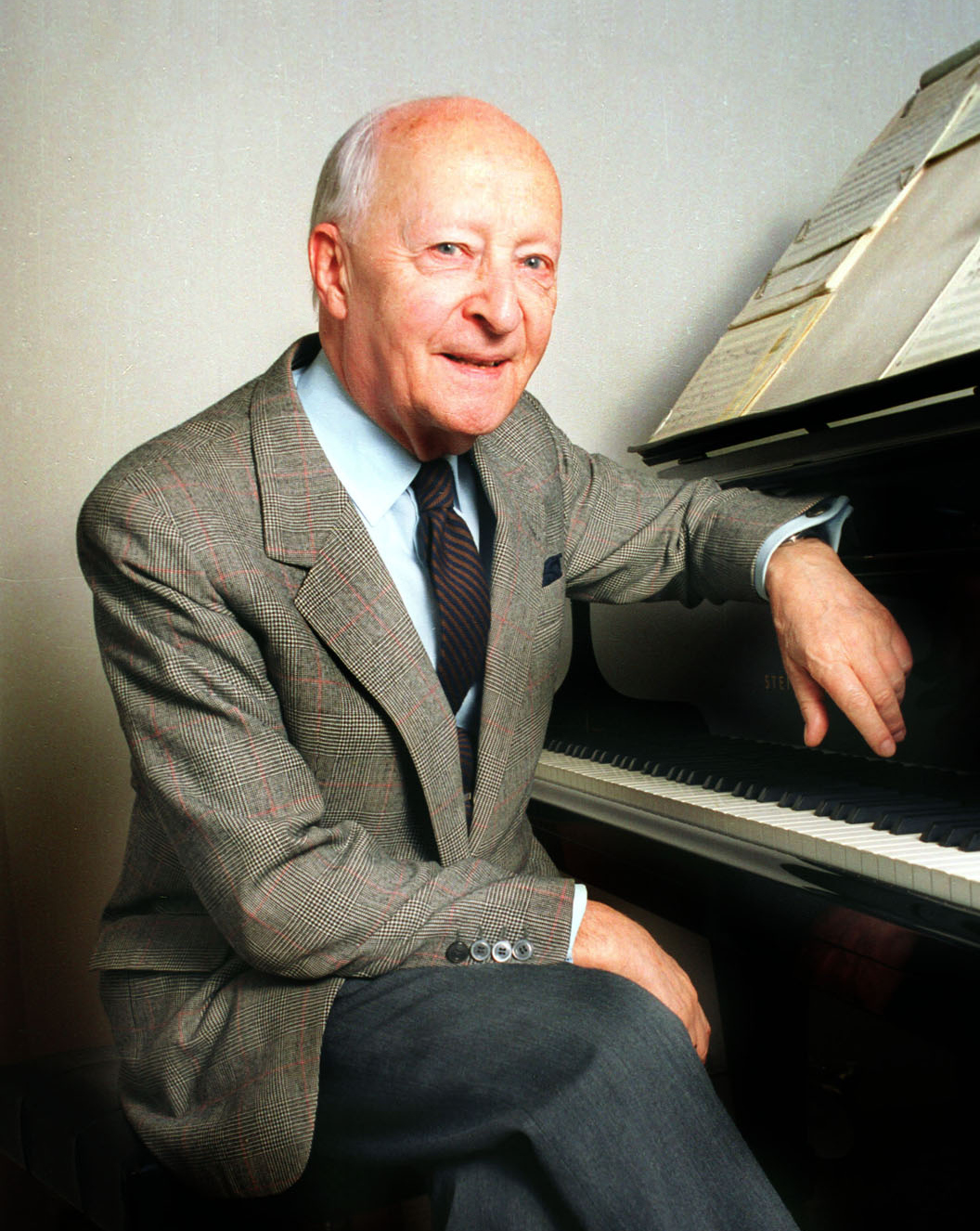
- Lutosławski in 1992
- Born: 25 January 1913; Warsaw, Congress Poland
- Died: 7 February 1994 (aged 81); Warsaw, Poland
- Education: University of Warsaw
- Occupations: Composer; conductor
- Works: List of compositions

Witold Roman Lutosławski (Polish: [ˈvitɔlt lutɔˈswafskʲi]; 25 January 1913 – 7 February 1994) was a Polish composer and conductor. Among the major composers of 20th-century classical music, he is "generally regarded as the most significant Polish composer since Szymanowski, and possibly the greatest Polish composer since Chopin". His compositions—of which he was a notable conductor—include representatives of most traditional genres, aside from opera: symphonies, concertos, orchestral song cycles, other orchestral works, and chamber works. Among his best known works are his four symphonies, the Variations on a Theme by Paganini (1941), the Concerto for Orchestra (1954), and his cello concerto (1970).

During his youth, Lutosławski studied piano and composition in Warsaw. His early works were influenced by Polish folk music and demonstrated a wide range of rich atmospheric textures. His folk-inspired music includes the Concerto for Orchestra (1954)—which first brought him international renown—and Dance Preludes (1955), which he described as a "farewell to folklore". From the late 1950s he began developing new, characteristic composition techniques. He introduced limited aleatoric elements, while retaining tight control of his music's material, architecture, and performance. He also evolved his practice of building harmonies from small groups of musical intervals.

During World War II, after narrowly escaping German capture, Lutosławski made a living playing the piano in Warsaw bars. After the war, Stalinist authorities banned his First Symphony for being "formalist": accessible only to an elite. Rejecting anti-formalism as an unjustified retrograde step, Lutosławski resolutely strove to maintain his artistic integrity, providing artistic support to the Solidarity movement throughout the 1980s. He received numerous awards and honours, including the Grawemeyer Award and a Royal Philharmonic Society Gold Medal. In 1994, Lutosławski was awarded Poland's highest honour, the Order of the White Eagle.

== Life and career ==
=== Early years (1913–1938) ===
Witold Roman Lutosławski was born on 25 January 1913, in Warsaw, Poland. His parents were both born into the Polish landed nobility; they owned estates in the area of Drozdowo. His father Józef was involved in the Polish National Democratic Party ("Endecja"), and the Lutosławski family became intimate with its founder, Roman Dmowski (Witold Lutosławski's middle name was Roman). Józef Lutosławski studied in Zürich, where in 1904 he met and married a fellow student, Maria Olszewska, who later became Lutosławski's mother. Józef pursued his studies in London, where he acted as correspondent for the National-Democratic newspaper, Goniec. He continued to be involved in National Democracy politics after returning to Warsaw in 1905, and took over the management of the family estates in 1908. Witold Roman Lutosławski, the youngest of three brothers, was born in Warsaw shortly before the outbreak of World War I.

In 1915, with Russia at war with Germany, Prussian forces drove towards Warsaw. The Lutosławskis travelled east to Moscow, where Józef remained politically active, organising Polish Legions ready for any action that might liberate Poland (which had been divided over a century earlier—Warsaw was part of Tsarist Russia). Dmowski's strategy was for Russia to guarantee security for a new Polish state. In 1917, the February Revolution forced the Tsar to abdicate, and the October Revolution started a new Soviet government that made peace with Germany. Józef's activities were now in conflict with the Bolsheviks, who arrested him and his brother Marian. Thus, although fighting stopped on the Eastern Front in 1917, the Lutosławskis were prevented from returning home. The brothers were interned in Butyrskaya prison in central Moscow, where Witold—by then aged five—visited his father. Józef and Marian were executed by a firing squad in September 1918, some days before their scheduled trial.

After the war, the family returned to the newly independent Poland, only to find their estates ruined. After his father's death, other members of the family played an important part in Witold's early life, especially Józef's half-brother Kazimierz Lutosławski, a priest and politician.

At age six, Lutosławski started two years of piano lessons in Warsaw. After the Polish-Soviet War the family left Warsaw to return to Drozdowo, but after a few years of running the estates with limited success, his mother returned to Warsaw. She worked as a physician, and translated books for children from English. In 1924, Lutosławski entered secondary school (Stefan Batory Gymnasium) while continuing piano lessons. A performance of Karol Szymanowski's Third Symphony deeply affected him. In 1925, he started violin lessons at the Warsaw Music School. In 1931, he enrolled at Warsaw University to study mathematics, and in 1932 he formally joined the composition classes at the Conservatory. His only composition teacher was Witold Maliszewski, a renowned Polish composer who had been a pupil of Nikolai Rimsky-Korsakov. Lutosławski was given a strong grounding in musical structures, particularly movements in sonata form. In 1932, he gave up the violin, and in 1933 he discontinued his mathematics studies to concentrate on the piano and composition. As a student of Jerzy Lefeld, he gained a diploma for piano performance from the Conservatory in 1936, after presenting a virtuoso program including Schumann's Toccata and Beethoven's fourth piano concerto. His diploma for composition was awarded by the same institution in 1937.

=== World War II (1939–1945) ===
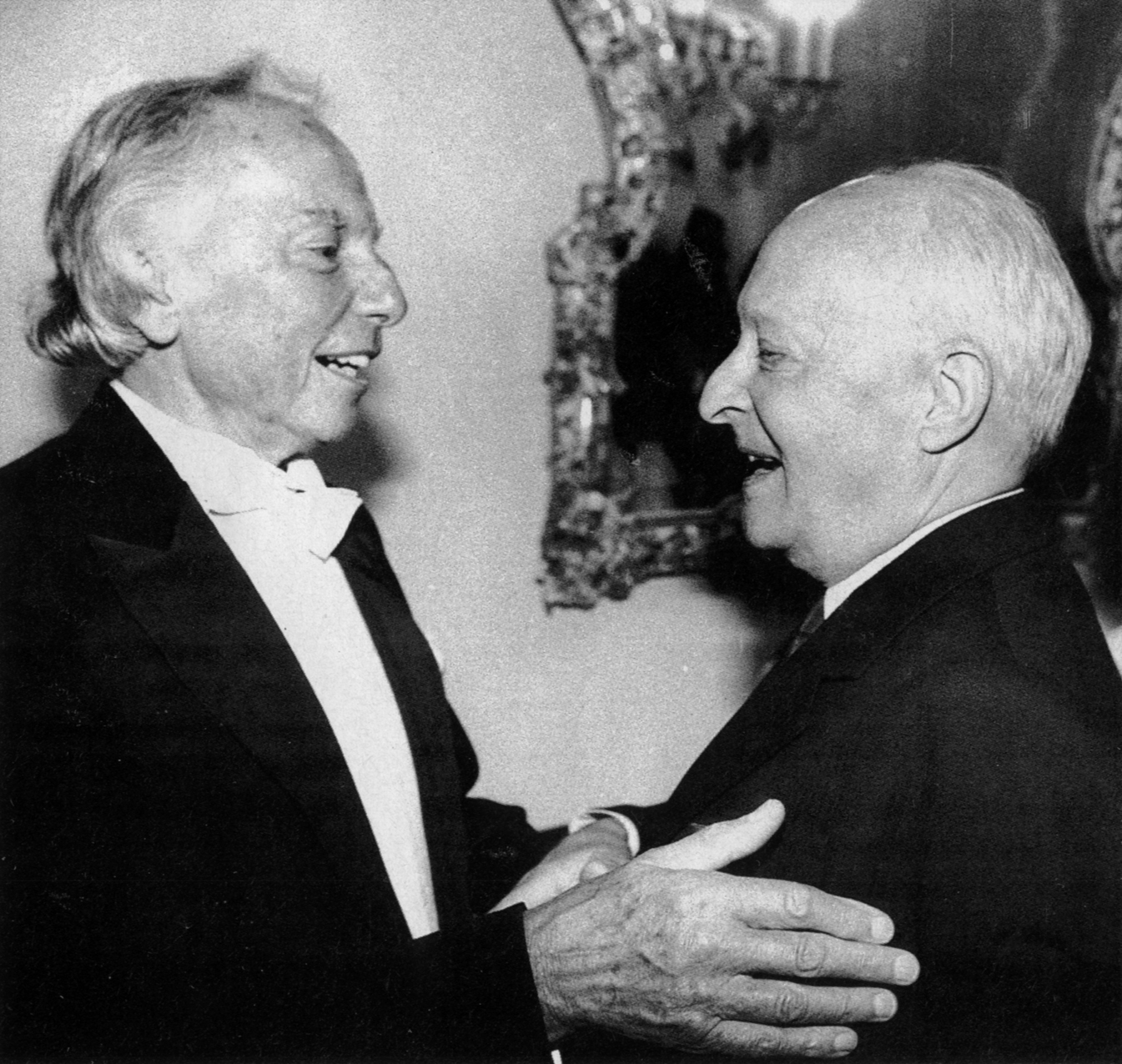
Lutosławski (right) greets his old friend Andrzej Panufnik (left) in 1990.

Military service followed; Lutosławski was trained in signalling and radio operating in Zegrze near Warsaw. He completed his Symphonic Variations in 1939. The work was premiered by the Polish Radio Symphony Orchestra conducted by Grzegorz Fitelberg, with the performance broadcast on radio on 9 March 1939. Like most young Polish composers, Lutosławski wanted to continue his education in Paris. His plans for further musical study were dashed in September 1939, when Germany invaded western Poland and Russia invaded eastern Poland. Lutosławski was mobilised with the radio unit for the Kraków Army. He was soon captured by German soldiers, but escaped while being marched to prison camp, walking 250 miles (400 km) back to Warsaw. Lutosławski's brother was captured by Russian soldiers and later died in a Siberian labour camp.

To earn a living, Lutosławski joined "Dana Ensemble", the first Polish revellers, as an arranger-pianist, singing in "Ziemiańska Cafe". He then formed a piano duo with friend and fellow composer Andrzej Panufnik, performing together in Warsaw cafés. Their repertoire consisted of a wide range of music in their own arrangements, including the first incarnation of Lutosławski's Variations on a Theme by Paganini, a transcription of the 24th Caprice for solo violin by Niccolò Paganini. Defiantly, they sometimes played Polish music (the Nazis banned Polish music in Poland—including that of Frédéric Chopin), and composed Resistance songs. Listening in cafés was the only way in which the Poles of German-occupied Warsaw could hear live music; putting on concerts was impossible since the Germans occupying Poland prohibited any organised gatherings. In café Aria, where they played, Lutosławski met his future wife Maria Danuta Bogusławska, a sister of the writer Stanisław Dygat.

Lutosławski left Warsaw in July 1944 with his mother, just a few days before the Warsaw Uprising. During the complete destruction of the city by Germans after the failure of the uprising, most of his music was lost, as were the family's Drozdowo estates. He was able to salvage only a few scores and sketches; of the 200 or so arrangements that Lutosławski and Panufnik had worked on for their piano duo, only Lutosławski's Variations on a Theme by Paganini survived. Lutosławski returned to the ruins of Warsaw after the Polish-Soviet treaty in April 1945.

=== Post-war years (1946–1955) ===
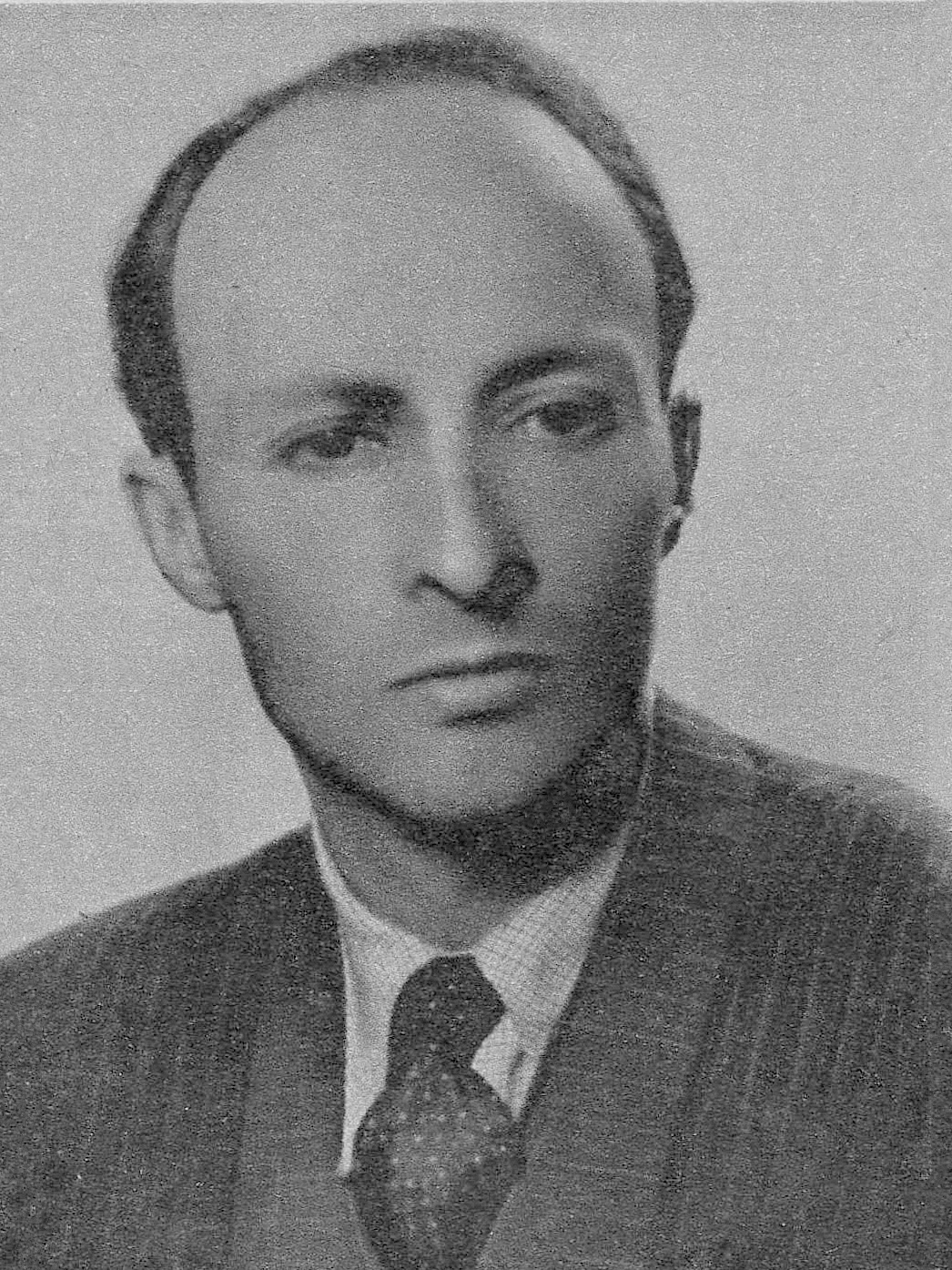
Lutosławski on 16 August 1946

During the postwar years, Lutosławski worked on his First Symphony—sketches of which he had salvaged from Warsaw—which he had started in 1941. It was first performed in 1948, conducted by Fitelberg. To provide for his family, he also composed music that he termed functional, such as the Warsaw Suite (written to accompany a silent film depicting the city's reconstruction), sets of Polish Carols, and the study pieces for piano, Melodie Ludowe ("Folk Melodies").

In 1945, Lutosławski was elected as secretary and treasurer of the newly constituted Union of Polish Composers (ZKP—Związek Kompozytorów Polskich). In 1946, he married Danuta Bogusławska. The marriage was a lasting one, and Danuta's drafting skills were of great value to the composer: she became his copyist, and solved some of the notational challenges of his later works.

In 1947, the Stalinist political climate led to the adoption and imposition by the ruling Polish United Workers' Party of the tenets of socialist realism. The political authorities condemned new compositions deemed to be non-conformist. This artistic censorship, which ultimately came from Stalin personally, was to some degree prevalent over the whole Eastern bloc, and was reinforced by the 1948 Zhdanov decree. By 1948, the ZKP was taken over by musicians willing to follow the party line on musical matters. Lutosławski resigned from the committee, implacably opposed to the ideas of socialist realism.

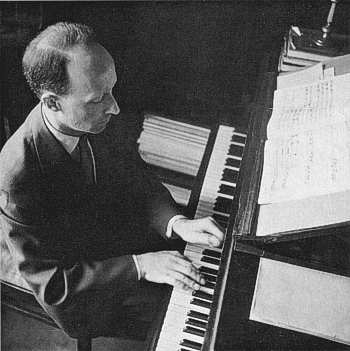
Lutosławski at the piano, c. 1952–1953

Lutoslawski's First Symphony was proscribed as "formalist", and he found himself shunned by the Soviet authorities, a situation that continued throughout the era of Khrushchev, Brezhnev, Andropov and Chernenko. In 1954, the climate of musical oppression drove his friend Andrzej Panufnik to defect to the United Kingdom. Against this background, Lutosławski was content to compose pieces for which there was social need, but in 1954 this earned him—much to the composer's chagrin—the Prime Minister's Prize for a set of children's songs. He commented: "[I]t was for those functional compositions of mine that the authorities decorated me ... I realised that I was not writing indifferent little pieces, only to make a living, but was carrying on an artistic creative activity in the eyes of the outside world."

It was his substantial and original Concerto for Orchestra of 1954 that established Lutosławski as an important composer of art music. The work, commissioned in 1950 by the conductor Witold Rowicki for the newly reconstituted Warsaw Philharmonic Orchestra, earned the composer two state prizes in the following year.

=== Maturity (1956–1967) ===
Stalin's death in 1953 allowed a certain relaxation of the cultural totalitarianism in Russia and its satellite states. By 1956, political events had led to a partial thawing of the musical climate, and the Warsaw Autumn Festival of Contemporary Music was founded. Conceived as a biennial festival, it has been held annually ever since 1958 (except under Martial law in 1982 when, in protest, the ZKP refused to organise it). The first performance of his Musique funèbre (in Polish, Muzyka żałobna, English Funereal Music or Music of Mourning) took place in 1958. It was written to commemorate the 10th anniversary of the death of Béla Bartók, but took the composer four years to complete. This work brought international recognition, and the annual ZKP prize and the International Rostrum of Composers prize in 1959. Lutosławski's harmonic and contrapuntal thinking were developed in this work, and in the Five songs of 1956–57, as he introduced his twelve-note system, he realised the fruits of many years of thought and experiment. Another new feature of his compositional technique became a Lutosławski signature: he introduced randomness into the exact synchronisation of various parts of the musical ensemble in Jeux vénitiens ("Venetian games"). These harmonic and temporal techniques became part of every subsequent work, and were integral to his style.

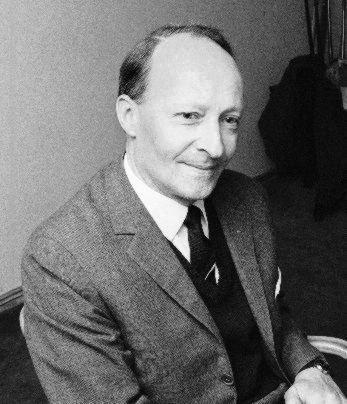
Lutosławski during his visit to Finland, 10 March 1965

In a departure from his usually serious compositions in 1957 to 1963, Lutosławski also composed light music under the pseudonym Derwid. Mostly waltzes, tangos, foxtrots and slow-foxtrots for voice and piano, these pieces are in the genre of Polish actors' songs. Their place in Lutosławski's output may be seen as less incongruous in light of his own performances of cabaret music during the war, as well as his relationship by marriage to his wife's sister-in-law, the famous Polish cabaret singer Kalina Jędrusik.

In 1963, Lutosławski fulfilled a commission for the Music Biennale Zagreb, his Trois poèmes d'Henri Michaux for chorus and orchestra. It was the first work he had written for a commission from abroad, and brought him further international acclaim. It earned him a second State Prize for music (Lutosławski was not cynical about the award this time), and he gained an agreement for the international publication of his music with Chester Music, then part of the Hansen publishing house. His String Quartet was first performed in Stockholm in 1965, followed the same year by the first performance of his orchestral song-cycle Paroles tissées. This shortened title was suggested by the poet Jean-François Chabrun, who had published the poems as Quatre tapisseries pour la Châtelaine de Vergi. The song cycle is dedicated to the tenor Peter Pears, who first performed it at the 1965 Aldeburgh Festival with the composer conducting. (The Festival was founded and organised by Benjamin Britten, with whom the composer formed a lasting friendship.)

Shortly after this, Lutosławski started work on his Second Symphony, which had two premieres: Pierre Boulez conducted the second movement, Direct, in 1966, and when the first movement, Hésitant, was finished in 1967, the composer conducted a complete performance in Katowice. The Second Symphony is very different from a conventional classical symphony in structure, with Lutosławski using his many compositional innovations to build a large-scale, dramatic work worthy of the name. In 1968, the Symphony earned Lutosławski first prize from the International Music Council's International Rostrum of Composers, his third such award, confirming his growing international reputation. In 1967, Lutosławski was awarded the Léonie Sonning Music Prize, Denmark's highest musical honour.

=== International renown (1967–1982) ===
The Second Symphony, and Livre pour orchestre and a Cello Concerto that followed, were composed during a particularly traumatic period in Lutosławski's life. His mother died in 1967, and in 1967–70 there was a great deal of unrest in Poland. This sprang first from the suppression of the theatre production Dziady, which sparked a summer of protests; later, in 1968, the use of Polish troops to suppress the liberal reforms in Czechoslovakia's Prague Spring, and the Gdańsk Shipyards strike of 1970—which led to a violent clampdown by the authorities, both caused significant political and social tension in Poland. Lutosławski did not support the Soviet regime, and these events have been postulated as reasons for the increase in antagonistic effects in his work, particularly the Cello Concerto of 1968–70 for Rostropovich and the Royal Philharmonic Society. Indeed, Rostropovich's own opposition to the Soviet regime in Russia was just coming to a head (he shortly afterwards declared his support for the dissident Aleksandr Solzhenitsyn). Lutosławski himself did not hold the view that such influences had a direct effect on his music, although he acknowledged that they impinged on his creative world to some degree. In any case, the Cello Concerto was a great success, earning both Lutosławski and Rostropovich accolades. At the work's première with the Bournemouth Symphony Orchestra, Arthur Bliss presented Rostropovich with the Royal Philharmonic Society's gold medal.

In 1973, Lutosławski attended a recital given by the baritone Dietrich Fischer-Dieskau with the pianist Sviatoslav Richter in Warsaw; he met the singer after the concert and this inspired him to write his extended orchestral song Les Espaces du sommeil ("The spaces of sleep"). This work, Preludes and Fugue, Mi-Parti (a French expression that roughly translates as "divided into two equal but different parts"), Novelette, and a short piece for cello in honour of Paul Sacher's seventieth birthday, occupied Lutosławski throughout the 1970s, while in the background he was working away at a projected Third symphony and a concertante piece for the oboist Heinz Holliger. These latter pieces were proving difficult to complete, as Lutosławski struggled to introduce greater fluency into his sound world and to reconcile tensions between the harmonic and melodic aspects of his style, and between foreground and background. The Double Concerto for oboe, harp and chamber orchestra—commissioned by Sacher—was finally finished in 1980, and the Third Symphony in 1983. In 1977, he received the Order of the Builders of People's Poland. In 1983, he received the Ernst von Siemens Music Prize.

During this period, Poland was undergoing yet more upheaval: in 1980, the influential movement Solidarność was created, led by Lech Wałęsa; and in 1981, martial law was declared by General Wojciech Jaruzelski. From 1981 to 1989, Lutosławski refused all professional engagements in Poland as a gesture of solidarity with the artists' boycott. He refused to enter the Culture Ministry to meet any of the ministers, and was careful not be photographed in their company. In 1983, as a gesture of support, he sent a recording of the first performance (in Chicago) of the Third Symphony to Gdańsk to be played to strikers in a local church. In 1983, he was awarded the Solidarity prize, of which Lutosławski was reported to be more proud than any other of his honours.

=== Final years (1983–1994) ===
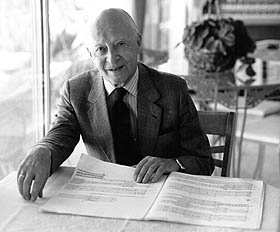
Lutosławski in 1993, by Betty Freeman

Through the mid-1980s, Lutosławski composed three pieces called Łańcuch ("Chain"), which refers to the way the music is constructed from contrasting strands that overlap like the links of a chain. Chain 2 was written for Anne-Sophie Mutter (commissioned by Sacher), and for Mutter he also orchestrated his slightly earlier Partita for violin and piano, providing a new linking Interlude, so that when played together the Partita, Interlude, and Chain 2 form his longest work.

In 1985, the Third Symphony earned Lutosławski the first Grawemeyer Prize from the University of Louisville, Kentucky. The significance of the prize lay not just in its prestige but in the size of its financial award (then US$150,000). The award is intended to remove recipients' financial concerns for a period to allow them to concentrate on serious composition. In a gesture of altruism, Lutosławski announced that he would use the fund to set up a scholarship to enable young Polish composers to study abroad; Lutosławski also directed that his fee from the San Francisco Symphony Orchestra for Chain 3 should go to this scholarship fund.

In 1986, Lutosławski was presented (by Michael Tippett) with the rarely awarded Royal Philharmonic Society's Gold Medal during a concert in which Lutosławski conducted his Third Symphony; also that year a major celebration of his work was made at the Huddersfield Contemporary Music Festival. In addition, he was awarded honorary doctorates at several universities worldwide, including Cambridge.

At this time Lutosławski was writing his Piano Concerto for Krystian Zimerman, commissioned by the Salzburg Festival. His earliest plans to write a piano concerto dated from 1938; he was himself in his younger days a virtuoso pianist. It was a performance of this work and the Third Symphony at the Warsaw Autumn Festival in 1988 that marked the composer's return to the conductor's podium in Poland, after substantive talks had been arranged between the government and the opposition.

Around 1990 Lutosławski also worked on a fourth symphony and his orchestral song-cycle Chantefleurs et Chantefables for soprano. The latter was first performed at a Prom concert in London in 1991, and the Fourth Symphony in 1993 in Los Angeles. In between, and after initial reluctance, Lutosławski took on the presidency of the newly reconstituted Polish Cultural Council, which was set up after the 1989 legislative elections led to the end of communist rule in Poland.

In 1993, Lutosławski continued his busy schedule, travelling to the United States, England, Finland, Canada and Japan, and sketching a violin concerto, but by the first week of 1994 it was clear that cancer had taken hold, and after an operation the composer weakened quickly and died on 7 February, aged 81. He had, a few weeks before, been awarded Poland's highest honour, the Order of the White Eagle (only the second person to receive this since the collapse of communism in Poland—the first had been Pope John Paul II). He was cremated; his wife Danuta died shortly afterwards.

== Music ==
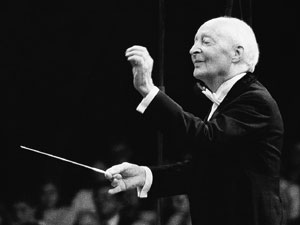
Lutosławski conducting

Lutosławski described musical composition as a search for listeners who think and feel the same way he did—he once called it "fishing for souls".

=== Folk influence ===
Lutosławski's works up until and including the Dance Preludes (1955) show the influence of Polish folk music, both harmonically and melodically. Part of his art was in transforming folk music, rather than quoting it exactly. In some cases, such as the Concerto for Orchestra, folk music is unrecognisable as such without careful analysis. As Lutosławski developed the techniques of his mature compositions, he stopped using folk material explicitly, although its influence remained as subtle features until the end. As he said, "[in those days] I could not compose as I wished, so I composed as I was able", and about this change of direction he said, "I was simply not so interested in it [using folk music]". Also, Lutosławski was dissatisfied with composing in a "post-tonal" idiom: while composing the first symphony, he felt that this was for him a cul-de-sac. As such, Dance Preludes would prove to be his final composition centered around folk music; he described it as a "farewell to folklore".

=== Pitch organisation ===
In Five Songs (1956–57) and Musique funèbre (1958) Lutosławski introduced his own brand of twelve-tone music, marking his departure from the explicit use of folk music. His twelve-tone technique allowed him to build harmony and melody from specific intervals (in Musique funèbre, augmented fourths and semitones). This system also gave him the means to write dense chords without resorting to tone clusters, and enabled him to build towards these dense chords (which often include all twelve notes of the chromatic scale) at climactic moments. Lutosławski's twelve-note techniques were thus completely different in conception from Arnold Schoenberg's tone-row system, although Musique funèbre does happen to be based on a tone row. This twelve-note intervallic technique had its genesis in earlier works such as Symphony No. 1, and Variations on a Theme by Paganini.

=== Aleatory technique ===
Although Musique funèbre was internationally acclaimed, his new harmonic techniques led to something of a crisis for Lutosławski, during which he still could not see how to express his musical ideas. Then on 16 March 1960, listening to Polish Radio broadcast on new music, he happened to hear John Cage's Concert for Piano and Orchestra. Although he was not influenced by the sound or the philosophy of the music, Cage's explorations of indeterminacy set off a train of thought that resulted in Lutosławski finding a way to retain the harmonic structures he wanted while introducing the freedom for which he was searching. His Three Postludes were hastily rounded off (he had intended to write four) and he moved on to compose works in which he explored these new ideas.

In works from Jeux vénitiens, Lutosławski wrote long passages in which the parts of the ensemble are not to be synchronised exactly. At cues from the conductor, each instrumentalist may be instructed to move straight on to the next section, to finish their current section before moving on, or to stop. In this way, the random elements within compositionally controlled limits defined by the term aleatory are carefully directed by the composer, who controls the architecture and harmonic progression of the piece precisely. Lutosławski notated the music exactly; there is no improvisation, no choice of parts is given to any instrumentalist, and there is thus no doubt about how the musical performance is to be realised.

For his String Quartet, Lutosławski had produced only the four instrumental parts, refusing to bind them in a full score, because he was concerned that this would imply that he wanted notes in vertical alignment to coincide, as is the case with conventionally notated classical ensemble music. The LaSalle Quartet, however, specifically requested a score from which to prepare for the first performance. Bodman Rae relates that Danuta Lutosławska solved this problem by cutting up the parts and sticking them together in boxes (which Lutosławski called mobiles), with instructions on how to signal in performance when all of the players should proceed to the next mobile. In his orchestral music, these problems of notation were not so difficult, because the instructions on how and when to proceed are given by the conductor. Lutosławski's called this technique of his mature period "limited aleatorism".

Example 1, numbers 7 to 9 from the score of the Second Symphony (1966–67), illustrates Lutosławski's harmonic and aleatory procedures from his mature style

Both Lutosławski's harmonic and aleatory processes are illustrated by example 1, an excerpt from Hésitant, the first movement of the Symphony No. 2. At number 7, the conductor gives a cue to the flutes, celesta and percussionist, who then play their parts in their own time, without any attempt to synchronise with the other instrumentalists. The harmony of this section is based on a 12-note chord built from major seconds and perfect fourths. After all the instrumentalists have finished their parts, a two-second general pause is indicated ("P.G. 2" at top right of the example). The conductor then gives a cue at number 8 (and indicates the tempo of the following section) for two oboes and the cor anglais. They each play their part, again with no attempt to synchronise with the other players. The harmony of this part is based on the hexachord F♯–G–A♭–C–D♭–D, arranged in such a way that the harmony of the section never includes any sixths or thirds. When the conductor gives another cue at number 9, the players each continue until they reach the repeat sign, and then stop: they are unlikely to end the section at the same time. This "refrain" (from numbers 8 to 9) recurs throughout the movement, slightly altered each time, but always played by double-reed instruments that do not play elsewhere in the movement: Lutosławski thus also carefully controls the orchestral palette.

=== Late style ===
External audio
- Symphony No. 4 performed by the Los Angeles Philharmonic and Esa-Pekka Salonen
- Symphony No. 4

The combination of Lutosławski's aleatory techniques and his harmonic discoveries allowed him to build up complex musical textures. According to Bodman Rae, in his later works Lutosławski evolved a more mobile, simpler, harmonic style, in which less of the music is played with an ad libitum coordination. This development first appeared in the brief Epitaph for oboe and piano, around the time Lutosławski was struggling to find the technical means to complete his Third Symphony. In chamber works for just two instrumentalists the scope for aleatory counterpoint and dense harmonies is significantly less than for orchestra.

Lutosławski's formidable technical developments grew out of his creative imperative; that he left a body of major compositions is a testament to his resolution of purpose in the face of the anti-formalist authorities under which he formulated his methods.

== Legacy ==
In the 21st century, Lutosławski is generally considered the most important Polish composer since Szymanowski, and perhaps the most outstanding since Chopin. This evaluation was not apparent after World War II, when Panufnik was more highly regarded in Poland. The success of Lutosławski's Concerto for Orchestra and Panufnik's 1954 defection to England brought Lutosławski to the forefront of modern Polish classical music. Initially, he was coupled with his younger contemporary Krzysztof Penderecki, due to their music's shared stylistic and technical characteristics. When Penderecki's reputation declined in the 1970s, Lutosławski emerged as the major Polish composer of his time and among the most significant 20th-century European composers. His four symphonies, the Variations on a Theme by Paganini (1941), the Concerto for Orchestra (1954), and a cello concerto (1970) are his best known works.

== Awards and honours ==
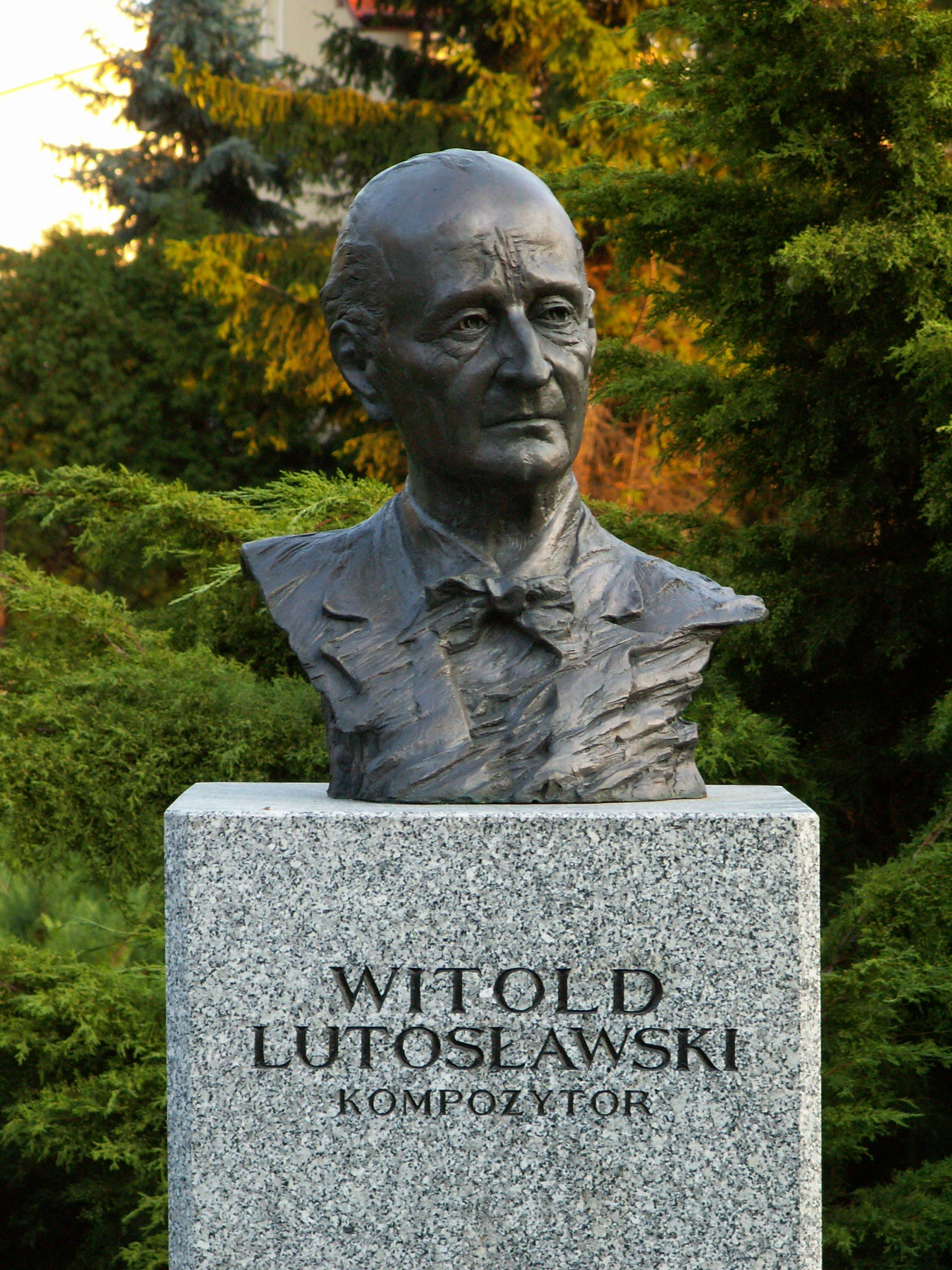
Bust of Witold Lutosławski by Arkadiusz Latos, Kielce, Poland

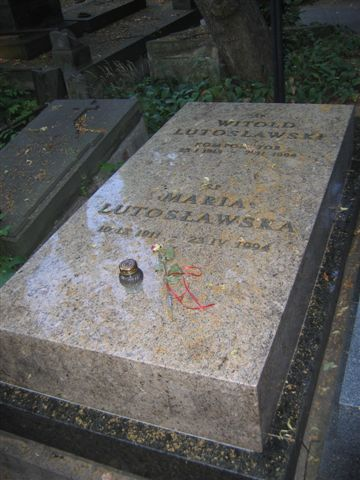
Monument to Witold Lutosławski and his wife Danuta at the Powązki Cemetery, Warsaw

See The Witold Lutosławski Society for a comprehensive list.

- Order of Polonia Restituta, 1953
- Order of the Banner of Labour, 1955
- Związek Kompozytorów Polskich (ZKP) Prize, 1959
- First Prize of the International Music Council's International Rostrum of Composers, 1959
- Koussevitzky Prix Mondial du Disque (France), 1964
- Grand Prix du Disque de Académie Charles Cros (France), 1965
- Jurzykowski Prize (United States), 1966
- Herder Prize (Germany/Austria), 1967
- Léonie Sonning Music Prize (Denmark), 1967
- First Prize of the International Music Council's International Rostrum of Composers, 1968
- Grand Prix du Disque de Académie Charles Cros (France), 1971
- Prix Maurice Ravel (France), 1971
- Honorary member of the Polish Composers' Union, 1971
- Wihuri Sibelius Prize (Finland), 1973
- Honorary degree of the University of Warsaw, 1973
- Koussevitzky Prix Mondial du Disque (France), 1976
- Order of the Builders of People's Poland, 1977
- Honorary degree of the Nicolaus Copernicus University in Toruń, 1980
- Ernst von Siemens Music Prize (Germany), 1983
- Honorary doctorate, Durham University 1983
- Honorary degree of the Jagiellonian University, 1984
- Queen Sofía Composition Prize (Spain), 1985
- Grawemeyer Award (United States), 1985
- Koussevitzky Prix Mondial du Disque (France), 1986
- Royal Philharmonic Society Gold Medal (United Kingdom), 1986
- Grammy Award for Best Classical Contemporary Composition, 1987
- Honorary doctorate, University of Cambridge, 1987
- Honorary degree of the Fryderyk Chopin University of Music, 1988
- Pour le Mérite for Sciences and Arts, 1993
- Polar Music Prize (Sweden), 18 May 1993
- Kyoto Prize (Japan), 1993
- Honorary doctorate, McGill University, 30 October 1993
- Order of the White Eagle (Poland), 1994

== Sources ==
Books

- Będkowski, Stanisław; Hrabia, Stanisław (2001). Witold Lutosławski: A Bio-bibliography. Santa Barbara: Greenwood Press. ISBN 978-0-313-25962-3.
- Bodman Rae, Charles (1999). The Music of Lutosławski, third edn. London: Omnibus Press. ISBN 978-0-7119-6910-0.
- Bodman Rae, Charles (2001). "Lutosławski, Witold". Grove Music Online. Oxford, England: Oxford University Press. doi:10.1093/gmo/9781561592630.article.17226. ISBN 978-1-56159-263-0. (subscription, Wikilibrary access, or UK public library membership required)
- Jacobson, Bernard (1996). A Polish Renaissance. London: Phaidon. ISBN 978-0-7148-3251-7.
- Bohlman, Andrea F. (2018). "Lutosławski's Political Refrains". In Jakelski, Lisa; Reyland, Nicholas (eds.). Lutosławski's Worlds. Suffolk: Boydell & Brewer. pp. 273–300. ISBN 978-1-78327-198-6. JSTOR 10.7722/j.ctt1wx91nn.
- Lutosławski, Witold; Varga, Bálint András (1976). Lutosławski Profile: Witold Lutosławski in Conversation with Bálint András Varga. London: Chester Music/Edition Wilhelm Hansen London Ltd.
- Nordwall, Ove, ed. (1968). Lutosławski. Stockholm: Edition Wilhelm Hansen.
- Panufnik, Andrzej (1987). Composing Myself. London: Methuen. ISBN 978-0-413-58880-7.
- Steinberg, Michael (2000). The Concerto. Oxford: Oxford University Press. ISBN 978-0-198-02634-1.
- Stucky, Steven (1981). Lutosławski and His Music. Cambridge: Cambridge University Press. ISBN 978-0-521-22799-5.

Online

- Witold Lutosławski – Guide to Warsaw. NIFC 2013 free app with biography
- "Life: Awards". The Witold Lutosławski Society. Archived from the original on 2 December 2021.
