= List of songs about the Vietnam War =

This is a list of songs concerning, revolving around, or directly referring to the Vietnam War, or to the Vietnam War's after-effects. For a more complete listing see "Vietnam on Record", and the Vietnam War Song Project.

Some popular songs of this variety include:

== 0–9 ==
- "19" by Paul Hardcastle
- "1954 Cha Bỏ Quê, 1975 Con Bỏ Nước" by Phạm Duy [about the two large migrations: in 1954 and 1975.]
- "2 + 2 = ?" by The Bob Seger System
- "50,000 Names" by George Jones [about the Vietnam Memorial wall]
- "7 O'Clock News/Silent Night" by Simon & Garfunkel
- "8th of November" by Big & Rich
- "21st Century Schizoid Man" by King Crimson

== A ==
- "The 'A' Team" by Staff Sgt. Barry Sadler
- "Agent Orange" by Grinder
- "Agent Orange" by Sodom
- "Agent Orange Song" by Maan Shah
- "Alice's Restaurant Massacree" by Arlo Guthrie
- "All My Children of the Sun" by Pete Seeger
- "Am I Ever Gonna See My Baby Again" by The Sweet Inspirations
- "Amerika the Brutal" by Six Feet Under
- "America, Fuck Yeah" by Trey Parker
- "American Woman" by Guess Who
- "An American Draft Dodger in Thunder Bay" by Sam Roberts
- "An Open Letter to My Teenage Son" by Victor Lundberg
- "Anh hùng đâu phải cứ mày râu" – Vũ Trọng Hối (about women who fight against the US army and the ARVN)
- "Anh phi công ơi!" – Xuân Giao (a children's song about communist airmen protecting Vietnam)
- "Anh Quân Bưu Vui Tính" – Đàm Thanh (about communist military postal men)
- "Anh lái xe đường dây" – Nguyễn Hữu Tuấn (about the couragement of communist transport driver driving on ropes to supply for communist troops)
- "Anh vẫn hành quân" – Huy Du (about communist troops still marching towards the battlefields for the national reunification despite attacks and bombardment from the US army and the ARVN)
- "Another Christmas Without My Son" by Reverend Oris Mays
- "Artefucked" by Nargaroth
- "Article IV" by Good Riddance (About US soldiers during The Tet-Offensive fighting for survival and protesters back in the states)

== B ==
- "Bà Mẹ Phù Sa" (all you need is love) Phạm Duy [about a peasant woman who hides a government agent when she sees a Vietcong, and in turn hides the Vietcong when she sees a government platoon coming.]
- "Bài Ca Dành Cho Những Xác Người" (Song for the Corpses) by Trịnh Công Sơn [about the Battle of Huế]
- "Bác Đang Cùng Chúng Cháu Hành Quân" – Huy Thục (about communist troops on Ho Chi Minh trail)
- "Bài ca bên cánh võng" – Nguyên Nhung
- "Bài ca chiến sĩ hải quân" – Văn Cao (about Vietnamese shipmen protecting Vietnam)
- "Bài ca Đường 9" – Huy Du (about communist troops in battle of Khe Sanh)
- "Bài ca Hà Nội" – Vũ Thanh (about Hanoi under bombardment of the US)
- "Bài ca hy vọng" – Văn Ký (about the hope on the national reunification)
- "Bài Ca Người Chiến Sĩ Hải Quân" – Thanh Trúc
- "Bài Ca Người Săn Máy Bay" – Văn Lưu (about Vietnamese pilots shooting down US fighter jets)
- "Bài ca người nữ tự vệ Sài Gòn" – Phạm Minh Tuấn (about Saigon's female urban commandos fighting against the US and the ARVN)
- "Bước chân trên dãy Trường Sơn" – Vũ Trọng Hối (about communist troops surpassing Trường Sơn mountains)
- "Bài ca không quên" – Phạm Minh Tuấn (about deaded companions in the communist army)
- "Back in Vietnam" by Lenny Kravitz
- "Back to Vietnam" by Television Personalities
- "Back to the World" by Curtis Mayfield
- "Badge of Courage" by Staff Sgt. Barry Sadler
- "Ball of Confusion (That's What the World is Today)" by The Temptations
- "Ballad of a Crystal Man" by Donovan
- "Ballad for a Soldier" by Leon Russell & Marc Benno
- "The Ballad of the Green Berets" by Staff Sgt. Barry Sadler
- "Ballad of Vietnam" by Ludvick Rummel
- "Bamiba" by Staff Sgt. Barry Sadler
- "Battalions of Fear" by Blind Guardian
- "The Battle Hymn of Lt. Calley" by Terry Nelson
- "The Battle of Vietnam" by Hal Willis
- "Beach Party Vietnam" by The Dead Milkmen
- "The Big Parade" by 10,000 Maniacs
- "Big Time in the Jungle" by Old Crow Medicine Show
- "Billy Don't Be a Hero" by Paper Lace
- "Black Flame" by Renaissance
- "Black Wall" by Dennis DeYoung (about the fear of being drafted, the fear during the war, and going "back to the world")
- "Born in the U.S.A." by Bruce Springsteen (references the Siege of Khe Sanh among other things.)
- "Born on the Fourth of July" by Tom Paxton
- "Broken Heroes" by Saxon
- "The Boy Who's Never Found" by The Katydids
- "Brainwashed" by The Bossmen (tells what happens to the people who come back from the war in Vietnam, and shows the post war trauma that happens)
- "Bring the Boys Home" by Freda Payne
- "Bring Them Home" by Pete Seeger
- "Brother Did You Weep" by Ewan MacColl and Peggy Seeger
- "Brothers Under the Bridge" by Bruce Springsteen
- "Burning Bridges" by Pink Floyd
- "Burnt Alive" by Rocket from the Crypt
- "Burnt Out Souls" by Despair
- "Business Goes on as Usual" by the Chad Mitchell Trio

== C ==
- "Ca Dao Mẹ" (Mother's Lullaby) by Trịnh Công Sơn [about a mother's sacrifices during wartime]
- "Cánh đồng hòa bình" - Trịnh Công Sơn
- "Câu hò bên bến Hiền Lương" – music: Hoàng Hiệp, lyric: Hoàng Hiệp – Đằng Giao (about the wish for the national reunification)
- "Chào Anh Giải Phóng Quân" – Hoàng Vân (celebration for the PLAF troops)
- "Chào Anh Giải Phóng Quân, Chào Mùa Xuân Đại Thắng" – Hoàng Vân Trình (celebration for the PLAF troops and the national reunification)
- "Chính chúng ta phải nói" - Trịnh Công Sơn
- "Chú Giải phóng quân cháu xin tặng chú một bài ca" – Vũ Thanh (a children's song for celebration to the PLAF troops)
- "Chúng ta đã đứng dậy" – Tôn Thất Lập (about the uprising of South Vietnamese youth against the ARVN and the US army)
- "Chiếc gậy Trường Sơn" – Phạm Tuyên (about the determination of communist troops on liberating South Vietnam)
- "Chiến sĩ Rađa trên chốt biên thùy" – Thuận Yến (about the fighting of communist radar soldiers)
- "Chim hòa bình" – (about the hope on peace)
- "Chờ nhìn quê hương sáng chói" - Trịnh Công Sơn
- "Chú bộ đội" – Hoàng Hà (about communist troops in Vietnam war)
- "Chưa hết giặc ta chưa về" – Huy Du (about the determination of communist troops on destroying the enemy)
- "Chưa mất niềm tin" - Trịnh Công Sơn
- "Chưa mòn giấc mơ" - Trịnh Công Sơn
- "Cô Gái Mở Đường"-Xuân Giao (about communist female army engineers)
- "Cô Gái Pa – Kô" – Huy Thục (about minority ethnic girls supporting communist troops)
- "Cô gái Sài Gòn đi tải đạn" – Lư Nhất Vũ (about Saigon girls supporting communist troops)
- "Cô Gái vót chông" – Hoàng Hiệp (about minority ethnic girls supporting communist troops)
- "Cho Một Người Vừa Nằm Xuống" – Trịnh Công Sơn
- "Cambodia" by Kim Wilde
- "Camouflage" by Stan Ridgway
- "Carried by Six" by Internal Void
- "Charlie Boy" by the Lumineers
- "Charlie Don't Surf" by The Clash
- "Charlie Freak" by Steely Dan
- "Child in Time" by Deep Purple
- "Cho Một Người Vừa Nằm Xuống" (For a Person Just Fallen Down) by Trịnh Công Sơn [dedicated to Lưu Kim Cương, a friend of the author who died in battle. Who is a Republic of Vietnam Air Force pilot.]
- "Christmas in Vietnam" by Johnny and Jon
- "Chuyện hai người lính" (Story about two soldiers) by Phạm Duy [1968, about two soldiers on different front lines who "kill each other because of love of Vietnam"]
- "Clean Cut Kid" by Bob Dylan (tells how a normal American boy is changed to a fierce fighting boy by the use of drugs, pills, and alcohol)
- "Coming Home Soldier" by Bobby Vinton
- "Commando" by The Ramones
- "Compared to What" by Gene McDaniels
- "Compulsory Hero" by 1927 [deals with conscription in Australia during the Vietnam War]
- "Copperhead Road" by Steve Earle
- "Cops of the World" by Phil Ochs
- "Cowboys on Horses with Wings" by Hoyt Axton
- "Cousin Randy" by Infectious Grooves
- "Cream Puff War" by The Grateful Dead
- "Cruel War" by Peter, Paul and Mary
- "Cry for Freedom" by The Starfires
- "Cùng anh tiến quân trên đường dài" – Huy Du và Xuân Sách (about Nguyễn Viêt Xuân, a hero in fighting against the US)
- "Cùng hành quân giữa mùa xuân" – Hoàng Hà (about happiness, beliefs on victories of communist troops on Ho Chi Minh trail)

== D ==
- "Daddy Won't Be Home Anymore" by Dolly Parton
- "Dậy mà đi" – Nhạc: Nguyễn Xuân Tân (Tôn Thất Lập), thơ: Tố Hữu (encourages for uprisings against the US and the Republic of Vietnam)
- "Đất nước trọn niềm vui" – Hoàng Hà (about happiness of Vietnamese on the national reunification)
- "Đại Bác Ru Đêm" (Cannon's Night Lullaby) by Trịnh Công Sơn [about bombardment in the city]
- "Dancing in the Ashes" by Psychotic Waltz
- "Dân Ta Vẫn Sống" (Our People Still Lives) by Trịnh Công Sơn
- "Daniel" by Elton John [the verse dealing most specifically with the Vietnam War was removed by lyricist Bernie Taupin shortly before being recorded.]
- "Đêm bây giờ đêm mai" - Trịnh Công Sơn
- "Đêm Trường Sơn" (Nights in Trường Sơn) – Huy Du (about nights and communist troops at Trường Sơn mountains)
- "Đêm Trường Sơn nhớ Bác" – Trần Chung (about the thinkings on Ho Chi Minh of communist troops surpassing Trường Sơn mountains)
- "Dead Yankee Drawl" by Manic Street Preachers
- "Dear Uncle Sam" by Loretta Lynn
- "Dear Mr. President" by Pink
- "Dear Neighbor" by Victor Lundberg
- "Death" by The Pretty Things
- "Death Sound" by Country Joe and the Fish
- "Deathbed" by Relient K
- "Death Tone" by Manowar
- "Desperation Part IV" by Redemption
- "Đi tìm quê hương" - Trịnh Công Sơn
- "Did You Ever See Me" by Shrubs
- "Did You Hear What They Said?" by Gil Scott-Heron
- "Do the Russians Want War?" by Mark Bernes
- "Does Anybody Know I'm Here?" by The Dells
- "Đôi mắt nào mở ra" - Trịnh Công Sơn
- "Đồng Đội ơi" (My companion!) by Nguyễn Giang (music) and Trương Vĩnh Tuấn (lyrics) (expressing the sentiment of communist veterans and soldiers to their sacrificed companions)
- "Đợi Có Một Ngày" (Wait Until the Day) by Trịnh Công Sơn (expressing the author's desire for peace)
- "Doin' All Right" by The Fugs
- "Đồng Dao Hoà Bình" (Children's Song of Peace) by Trịnh Công Sơn
- "Don't Cry My Love" by The Impressions
- "Don't Cry My Soldier Boy" by Thelma Houston
- "Don't Walk Away" by Shrubs
- "Door jou" by Gerard Cox
- "Down On The Base" by Leon Russell & Marc Benno
- "Dựng lại người dựng lại nhà" - Trịnh Công Sơn
- "Đừng mong ai, đừng nghi ngại" - Trịnh Công Sơn
- "Đường chúng ta đi" – Huy Du và Xuân Sách (about the determinations of communist troops)
- "Đường Trường Sơn xe anh qua" – Văn Dung (about Ho Chi Minh trails)
- "Draft Dodger Rag" by Phil Ochs
- "Draft Morning" by The Byrds
- "Draft Resister" by Steppenwolf
- "Drive On" by Johnny Cash

== E ==
- "El Derecho de Vivir en Paz" by Víctor Jara
- "The Edge of Darkness" by Iron Maiden
- "Eve of Destruction" by Barry McGuire [written by P. F. Sloan]
- "Everyday Combat" by Lostprophets
- "Em Bé Giải Phóng Quân" – Thanh Trúc (about the love of children for PLAF troops)
- "Era Um Garoto Que Como Eu Amava os Beatles e os Rolling Stones" by Os Incríveis (about an American boy, guitarist, that was sent to Vietnam, losing his youth, career, and life fighting)

== F ==
- "Fear of Napalm" by Terrorizer
- "Fellows in Vietnam" by Inez and Charlie Foxx
- "The Fiddle and the Drum" by Joni Mitchell
- "Fightin' for the U.S.A." by Jerry Reed
- "The Fightin' Side of Me" by Merle Haggard
- "Fight to be Free" by Nuclear Assault
- "Find the Cost of Freedom" by Crosby, Stills, Nash & Young
- "First Blood" by Evile
- "First Vietnamese War" by The Black Angels
- "The "Fish" Cheer/I-Feel-Like-I'm-Fixin'-to-Die Rag" by Country Joe McDonald
- "Flowers of Evil" by Mountain
- "Forget Me Not" by Martha Reeves and the Vandellas
- "For Fuck's Sake" by The Almighty
- "Fortunate Son" by Creedence Clearwater Revival
- "For No One" by Barclay James Harvest
- "For What It's Worth" by Buffalo Springfield
- "Front Line" by Stevie Wonder
- "Future Shock" by Evildead

== G ==
- "Galveston" by Glen Campbell
- "Galveston Bay" by Bruce Springsteen
- "Giải phóng miền Nam" (Liberate the South) by Huỳnh Minh Siêng
- "Gặp nhau trên đỉnh Trường Sơn" – Hoàng Hà (about meetings between communist troops at Ho Chi Minh trails)
- "Garet Trooper" by Staff Sgt. Barry Sadler
- "Gia Tài Của Mẹ" (A Mother's Legacy) by Trịnh Công Sơn
- "Giọt Nước Mắt Cho Quê Hương" (A Teardrop for Homeland) by Trịnh Công Sơn
- "Gimme Shelter" by The Rolling Stones
- "Give Peace a Chance" by John Lennon (Plastic Ono Band)
- "Godspeed" by The Red Jumpsuit Apparatus
- "Going to Vietnam" by Big Amos
- "Goodnight Saigon" by Billy Joel
- "Grass for Blades" by Jim Pembroke and Wigwam
- "The Great Goodnight" by Magellan
- "The Great Mandala" by Peter, Paul and Mary
- "Greetings (This is Uncle Sam)" by The Valadiers (also recorded by The Monitors)
- "Grey October" by Peggy Seeger
- "Gunya Down" by Pro-Pain

== H ==
- "Hà Nội – Điện Biên Phủ" – Phạm Tuyên (about victories of North Vietnam in Operation Linebaker II)
- "Hành khúc không quân Việt Nam" – Văn Cao
- "Hàng em mang tới chiến hào" – Lư Nhất Vũ (about logistics brought to communist troops at battlefields)
- "Hành Ca" - Trịnh Công Sơn
- "Hành Khúc Giải Phóng" – Long Hưng và Lưu Nguyễn
- "Hành khúc ngày và đêm" – Phan Huỳnh Điểu (about the love of a communist couple temporarily divided by the war)
- "Hát cho dân tôi nghe" Tôn Thất Lập (about South Vietnamese youth against the US and the Republic of Vietnam)
- "Hát mãi khúc quân hành" – Diệp Minh Tuyền (about the love toward peace and hatred toward war of communist troops)
- "Hát trên đường tranh đấu" –
- "Hát trong tù" – (the song of South Vietnamese youth being in prison because of against the US and the ARVN)
- "Hãy ca dạy lên"
- "Hãy đi cùng nhau" - Trịnh Công Sơn
- "Hãy giữ gìn lấy Việt Nam" – Văn Chung
- "Hãy nhìn lại" - Trịnh Công Sơn
- "Hãy nói giùm tôi" - Trịnh Công Sơn
- "Hò kéo pháo" – Hoàng Vân (the song communist troops singing while pulling artilleries by hand)
- "Hoan hô chú bộ đội" – Nguyễn Thanh Tùng (celebration communist troops shooting down the US fighter jets)
- "Hallelujah Day" by The Jackson 5
- "Hand of Doom" by Black Sabbath
- "Handsome Johnny" by Richie Havens
- "Hands Off Vietnam!" by Dzhilda Mazheykayte
- "Hanoi Hannah" by Roger McGuinn
- "Happy Xmas (War Is Over)" by John Lennon
- "Hát Trên Những Xác Người" (Singing on Corpses) by Trịnh Công Sơn [written following the Tet Offensive]
- "Hallå Där Bonde" (Hello there Farmer) by Knutna Nävar
- "He Wore the Green Beret" by Nancy Ames
- "Heart of Darkness" by Grave Digger
- "Hello Vietnam" by Johnnie Wright (also recorded by Dave Dudley)
- "Hello Vietnam (Goodbye My Love)" by Ray Hildebrand
- "Here's to the State of Richard Nixon" by Phil Ochs
- "High" by Richard Marx
- "Home" by Mac Davis. Also recorded by Gary Puckett & The Union Gap
- "Home from the War" by Lugh Damen
- "Ho Chi Minh City" by Shrubs
- "Ho Chi Minh" by Last Poets
- "Huế Sài Gòn Hà Nội" (Huế, Saigon, Hanoi) by Trịnh Công Sơn [expresses the author's desire for a peaceful, united Vietnam.]
- "Human Being Lawnmower" by MC5
- "Hungry for Blood" by Virus
- "Huyền Sử Một Người Mang Tên Quốc" (Ballad of a Person named Quốc) by Phạm Duy [about Phạm Phú Quốc, a RVAF pilot who bombed the Independence Palace in Saigon. He was shot down in North Vietnam in a mission to bomb the North.]

== I ==
- "I Ain't Marching Anymore" by Phil Ochs
- "I Believe I'm Gonna Make It" by Joe Tex
- "I Can't Write Left Handed" by Bill Withers
- "I-Feel-Like-I'm-Fixin'-to-Die Rag" by Country Joe and the Fish
- "I'd Love to Change the World" by Ten Years After
- "I'm Your Captain (Closer to Home)" by Grand Funk Railroad
- "Iron Man" by Black Sabbath
- "I Should Be Proud" by Martha Reeves and the Vandellas
- "I Want to Come Home for Christmas" by Marvin Gaye
- "I Was Only Nineteen (A Walk in the Light Green)" by Redgum
- "Imagine" by John Lennon
- "In the Slime of Vietnam" by Victor Lundberg
- "I've Seen All Good People" by Yes
- "Into the Fire" by Sabaton
- "I Say a Little Prayer" by Aretha Franklin

== K ==
- "Khe Sanh" by Cold Chisel
- "The Knife" by Genesis (Peter Gabriel, influenced by a book on Gandhi, "wanted to try [to] show how all violent revolutions inevitably end up with a dictator in power")
- "Kuiama" by the Electric Light Orchestra

== L ==
- "Last Train to Clarksville" by The Monkees
- "Long Live Our Love" by The Shangri-Las
- "Lost in the Flood" by Bruce Springsteen
- "Love Vigilantes" by New Order
- "Lời ru đêm" - Trịnh Công Sơn
- "Luang Prabang", by Dave Van Ronk
- "Lyndon Johnson Told the Nation", by Tom Paxton
- “Let’s Get Tetarded

== M ==
- "M-16" by Sodom
- "Machine Gun" by Band of Gypsys (Jimi Hendrix)
- "Madre" by Silvio Rodriguez
- "Mama Bake a Pie (Daddy Kill a Chicken)" by Tom T. Hall
- "Masters of War" by Bob Dylan
- "Military Madness" by Graham Nash
- "Monster" by Steppenwolf
- "More Than a Name on a Wall" by The Statler Brothers
- "Mountains" by Manowar
- "Mr. Lonely" by Bobby Vinton (#1 – 1964)
- "Một ngày vietnam"
- "Một ngày vinh quang một ngày tuyệt vọng" - Trịnh Công Sơn
- "Mùa áo quan" - Trịnh Công Sơn
- "My Buddy Carl" by Victor Lundberg

== N ==
- "Năm Anh Em Trên Một Chiếc Xe Tăng" – Doãn Nho (about communist tankmen)
- "Ngày dài trên quê hương" - Trịnh Công Sơn
- "Ngày Mai Chúng Mình Ra Trận" – Nhạc: Hoài Tố Hạnh, lời: Trần Đăng Khoa (nhà thơ) (about the feeling, believes in victory and the national reunification of Vietnamese communist youth, who was to join the war)
- "Ngày mai đây bình yên" - Trịnh Công Sơn
- "Ngủ đi con" - Trịnh Công Sơn
- "Ngụ ngôn của mùa Đông" - Trịnh Công Sơn
- "Người con gái Việt Nam" - Trịnh Công Sơn
- "Người mẹ Bàn Cờ" – Nhạc: Trần Long Ẩn, thơ: Nguyễn Kim Ngân (about Vietnamese mothers wanting peace)
- "Người mẹ miền Nam tay không thắng giặc" – Thuận Yến (about South Vietnamese mothers fighting against the US army and the ARVN)
- "Người mẹ Ô Lý" - Trịnh Công Sơn
- "Những ai còn là Việt nam" - Trịnh Công Sơn
- "Những giọt máu trổ bông" - Trịnh Công Sơn
- "Nhưng hôm nay" - Trịnh Công Sơn
- "Napalm in the Morning" by Sodom
- "The Nang, the Front, the Bush and the Shit" by El-P
- "Near Thái Nguyên Bridge" by Alexander Gusev
- "Như có Bác Hồ trong ngày vui đại thắng" (Uncle Ho likely was Here On the Day of Victory) by Phạm Tuyên (about the feelings that Ho Chi Minh being appear on the national reunification day).
- "Nối Vòng Tay Lớn" (Joining Hands) by Trịnh Công Sơn [expresses the author's wish for peace and national solidarity. This song was played on the radio after the communist forces took over Saigon's radio station during the Fall of Saigon.]
- "None of Your Doing" by Steppenwolf
- "No One to Follow" by Anvil
- "Not Now John" by Pink Floyd
- "A Nurse in the U.S. Army" by Connie Francis
- "Napalm Sticks to Kids" by unknown US servicemen, first recording by First of the Ninth Chorus
- "Những Bông Hoa Trên Tuyến Lửa" – Đỗ Trung Quân (about the happiness of communist troops on fighting against the US and the Republic of Vietnam)
- "Những ngày hội đấu tranh" – (about the uprising against the US and the Republic of Vietnam)
- The Night Belongs to Charlie - Aku Aku

== O ==
- "Ohio" by Crosby, Stills, Nash & Young
- "Okie from Muskogee" by Merle Haggard
- "Old Hippie" by The Bellamy Brothers
- "One Tin Soldier" by The Original Caste
- "Orange Crush" by R.E.M.

== P ==
- "Paint It Black" by Rolling Stones
- "Peace Train" by Cat Stevens
- "Pencil Marks on the Wall" by Henson Cargill
- "People, Let's Stop the War" by Grand Funk Railroad
- "Postcards from Saigon" by James Blundell
- "Protocol" by Gordon Lightfoot
- "Pull Out the Pin" by Kate Bush

== Q ==
- "Question" by The Moody Blues

== R ==
- "Rachel’s Coming Home" (aka "Rachel") by Russell Morris
- "Rapture" by Impaled Nazarene
- "Raymond" by Brett Eldredge
- "The Rebel" by Carl Hauck
- "Readjustment Blues" by Bill Danoff, sung by John Denver
- "Red" by Barefoot Truth
- "Reflected Prayer" by Shrubs
- "Reflections of My Life" by The Marmalade
- "Remember" by Biohazard
- "Remember the Heroes" by Sammy Hagar
- "Requiem for the Masses" by The Association
- "Return to Vietnam" by Master
- "Revolution" by The Beatles
- "Revolution 1" by The Beatles
- "Riding With Private Malone" by David Ball
- "Rooster" by Alice in Chains
- "Ruby, Don't Take Your Love to Town" by Kenny Rogers and the First Edition
- "Running Gun Blues" by David Bowie

== S ==
- "Saigon" by John Prine
- "Saigon" by Staff Sgt. Barry Sadler
- "Saigon Bride" by Joan Baez
- "Saigon Ơi Vĩnh Biệt" (Saigon, Goodbye) by Nam Lộc (a song for Vietnamese refugees having to flee their homeland after the Fall of Saigon)
- "Saigon Shrunken Panorama" by The Mountain Goats
- "Sài Gòn Quật Khởi" – Hồ Bắc (about the determination against the US and the Republic of Vietnam of people in Saigon)
- "Sao mắt mẹ chưa vui" - Trịnh Công Sơn
- "Sẵn sàng bắn" – Tô Hải (about communist antiaircraft gunmen fighting against the US airforce and the ARVN)
- "Salute to the Nurses" by Staff Sgt. Barry Sadler
- "Sam Stone" by John Prine
- "Sandman" by America
- "Save the Country" by Laura Nyro, also recorded by The Fifth Dimension
- "Sean Flynn" by The Clash
- "Search and Destroy" by The Stooges
- "Sergeant Death" by Fate
- "The Seductive Nature of Female Sexuality" by Buried Inside
- "Shapes of Things" by The Yardbirds
- "Shell Shock" by Manowar
- "Shut Out the Lights" by Bruce Springsteen [deals with Post-traumatic stress disorder of a returning veteran]
- "Simple Song of Freedom" by Bobby Darin
- "Singin' in Vietnam Talkin' Blues" by Johnny Cash
- "Sit Down Young Stranger" by Gordon Lightfoot
- "Skies on Fire" by AC/DC
- "Sky Pilot", written by Eric Burdon, recorded by The Animals
- "Slaughter" by Billy Preston
- "Smiley" by Ronnie Burns
- "Soldier" by Stephen Stills
- "Sợi nhớ sợi thương" – Phan Huỳnh Điểu (about the love of a communist couple)
- "Sức mạnh nhân dân" – (about the power of Vietnamese in the war against the US)
- "Soldier" by Neil Young
- "Soldier Boy" by The Shirelles
- "The Soldier Has Come Home" by Staff Sgt. Barry Sadler
- "Soldier of Misfortune" by Ogre
- "Soldier's Goodbye" by William Bell
- "Soldier's Plea" by Marvin Gaye
- "A Soldier's Prayer, 1967" by Archie Bell & the Drells
- "Some Gave All" by Billy Ray Cyrus
- "Someday at Christmas" by Stevie Wonder
- "Something to Believe In" by Poison
- "Son of the Freeway" by Gravestone
- "Song About the Vietnamese Friend" by Edmund Iodkovsky & Vano Muradeli
- "South Carolina" by Gil Scott-Heron
- "Spiral of Violence" by Whiplash
- "Spitting" by Rocket from the Crypt
- "Standing on the Corner" by Watson & The Sherlocks
- "Still in Saigon" by the Charlie Daniels Band
- "Stop the War Now" by Edwin Starr
- "Stop the War in Vietnam" by Laurel Aitken
- "Story of Isaac" by Leonard Cohen
- "Straight to Hell" by The Clash [deals with the abandonment of Vietnamese children fathered by American soldiers]
- "Student Demonstration Time" by The Beach Boys
- "Summer Side of Life" by Gordon Lightfoot
- "Sunshine" by Jonathan Edwards
- "Suppose They Give a War and No One Comes" by West Coast Pop Art Experimental Band
- "Surf Nicaragua" by Sacred Reich
- "Surrender" by Cheap Trick
- "Sympathy for the Devil" by The Rolling Stones

== T ==
- "Ta là chiến sĩ Giải Phóng quân" – Văn Lưu và Triều Dâng (about the pride of being the PLAF troops fighting against the US and the Republic of Vietnam)
- "Ta đã thấy gì trong đêm nay" – Trịnh Công Sơn
- "Ta đi dựng cờ" - Trịnh Công Sơn
- "Take Good Care" by Tony Mason
- "Take the Star Out of the Window" by John Prine
- "Talking Vietnam" by Phil Ochs
- "Talking Vietnam Potluck Blues" by Tom Paxton
- "Tame the Lion" by Emitt Rhodes
- "Ta quyết phải sống" - Trịnh Công Sơn
- "Ta Phải Thấy Mặt Trời" (We Must See the Sun) by Trịnh Công Sơn
- "Thank You" by the Bobkatz
- "That Black Wall" by Danny Barnes
- "Tên lửa ta đáng rất hay" – Huy Thục (about communist antiaircraft missile soldiers against the US airforce and the ARVN)
- "The Willing Conscript" by Tom Paxton
- "Theme for an American Hero" by Chip Taylor
- "Theme for an Imaginary Western" by Jack Bruce
- "There Won't Be Any Snow (Christmas in the Jungle)" by Derrik Roberts
- "There's a Wall in Washington" by Iris DeMent
- "This is Radio Clash" by The Clash
- "Three-Five-Zero-Zero" from the musical Hair
- "Through the Ages" by Bolt Thrower
- "Tình Ca Người Mất Trí" (Love Song of Someone Who Lost Their Mind) by Trịnh Công Sơn [about women with lovers who are soldiers]
- "This Ain't Nothing" by Craig Morgan
- "This Cowboy's Hat" by Chris Ledoux [talks about his nephew dying in 1969 in Vietnam]
- "Tiến bước dưới quân kỳ" – Doãn Nho
- "Tiến lên chiến sĩ đồng bào" – Huy Thục
- "Tiến Về Sài Gòn" – Lưu Hữu Phước (marching toward Saigon of communist troops)
- "Tiếng nói Hà Nội" – Nhạc: Văn An; Lời: Cảnh Trà (about Hanoi's voice on the hope towards national peace)
- "Tiếng Đàn Ta Lư" – Huy Thục (the sounds of minority ethnic supporting communist troops)
- "Tin tưởng ca" (the beliefs on national peace and reunification of Vietnamese)
- "Tình ca" – Hoàng Hiệp (about the love of a communist couple in the war)
- "Tình ca của người mất trí" - Trịnh Công Sơn
- "Tình nghĩa Bắc Nam" – (about the love between North and South Vietnamese)
- "Tiếng hát những đêm không ngủ" – Phạm Tuyên
- "Tiếng Hát Người Nữ Du Kích Củ Chi" – Lưu Cầu (nhạc sĩ) (about female communist guerilla at Củ Chi)
- "Tiểu đoàn 307" – Nguyễn Hữu Trí (about the 307 Battalion of the PLAF)
- "To Susan on the West Coast Waiting" by Donovan
- "To The Flower Power" by Victor Lundberg
- "Tôi sẽ đi thăm" - Trịnh Công Sơn
- "Travelin' Soldier" by Bruce Robison (popularized by the Dixie Chicks)
- "Train to Vietnam" by The Rudies
- "Trooper's Lament" by Staff Sgt. Barry Sadler
- "Trường Sơn Đông – Trường Sơn Tây" by Hoàng Hiệp [from a poem by Phạm Tiến Duật, about the love and the life of communist troops on the Ho Chi Minh trail.]
- "The Road of Life from Hanoi" by unknown Soviet military transportation officer
- "Thề quyết bảo vệ Tổ quốc" (Swear to defend the country) – Huy Du (Chinese version "誓死保卫祖国" also available in the late 1960s)
- "Thuyền em đi trong đêm" Nguyễn Phú Yên
- "Tổ quốc ơi đã ta nghe" – La Hữu Vang
- "Tôi biết tôi yêu" - Trịnh Công Sơn
- "Tôi Là Lê Anh Nuôi" – Trần Hiếu (about cooks in communist armies)
- "Tuổi trẻ Việt Nam" - Trịnh Công Sơn
- "Từ mặt đất thân yêu" – Tô Hải (about communist airmen fighting against the US army and the ARVN)
- "Tự nguyện" – Trương Quốc Khánh (about voluntary spirits of delication for Vietnam of communist youth)
- "Trên dòng sông lịch sử" – Nguyễn Nam
- "Trên đỉnh Trường Sơn ta hát" – Huy Du (the happiness of communist troops on Truong Son mountains)

== U ==
- "Uncle Sam" by Jimmy Hughes
- "Uncommon Valor: A Vietnam Story" by Jedi Mind Tricks
- "Universal Soldier" by Buffy Sainte-Marie; also recorded by Donovan
- "Unknown Soldier" by The Doors
- "Unknown Soldier" by Breaking Benjamin
- "Unnatural Selection" by Ayreon
- "Us and Them" by Pink Floyd

== V ==
- "Vaya con Dios-Fellow in Vietnam" by Inez and Charlie Foxx
- "Verbal Razors" by Exodus
- "Viet Nam Blues" by Dave Dudley
- "Vietnam" by Abner Jay
- "Vietnam" by Phil Ochs
- "Vietnam" by J. B. Lenoir
- "Vietnam" by The Satellites
- "Vietnam" by Jimmy Cliff
- "Vietnam" by Lars Frederiksen and the Bastards
- "Vietnam" by T-Bone Walker
- "Vietnam Blues" by J. B. Lenoir
- "Vietnam, Ho Chi Minh" by Ái Vân and The Blue Guitars
- "Vietnam Talkin' Blues" by Johnny Cash
- "Vietnam Vets" by Circle One
- "Vietnamerica" by The Stranglers
- "Vietnamese Baby" by New York Dolls
- "Vietnow" by Rage Against the Machine
- "Violence and Bloodshed" by Manowar
- "Việt Nam – đất nước tình yêu" – Lệ Giang (about the love of Vietnam)
- "Việt Nam ơi hãy vùng lên" - Trịnh Công Sơn
- "Việt Nam Ơi! Mùa Xuân Đến Rồi" – Huy Du (about the national reunification)
- "Vết chân tròn trên cát" – Trần Tiến (about a communist handicap veteran, who was a teacher before and after the war, he usually told his students about the happiness of the national reunification, the couragement and the sacrifice of communist troops)
- "Vì nhân dân quên mình" – Doãn Quang Khải (about the sacrifice for Vietnamese of communist troops)
- "Volunteers" by Jefferson Airplane

== W ==
- "Waist Deep in the Big Muddy" by Pete Seeger
- "Wait for Me" by Brothers of Soul
- "Walking on a Thin Line" by Huey Lewis and the News
- "Wake Up" by Rage Against the Machine
- "The Wall" by Tim Murphy
- "The Wall" by Bruce Springsteen
- "Wandering the Swamps of Vietnam" by unknown Soviet military advisor
- "War" by Edwin Starr (also recorded by The Temptations and performed by Bruce Springsteen)
- "War Games" by The Monkees
- "The War Drags On" written and recorded by Mick Softley; also recorded by Donovan
- "War Is a Card Game" by Nancy Ames
- "The War Is Over" by Phil Ochs
- "War Pigs" by Black Sabbath [written about the politicians who were responsible for the war.]
- "War Song" by Neil Young
- "War Sucks" by The Red Krayola
- "Watergate Blues" by Gil Scott-Heron
- "We Didn't Start the Fire" by Billy Joel
- "We Just Did What We Were Told" by Don Forbes
- "We've Gotta Get Out of This Place" by The Animals
- "Welcome the Boys Back Home" by Bill Moss & the Celestials
- "Welcome to the Real World" by Sweet Savage
- "Welcome Wagon" by Nasty Savage
- "Welterusten mijnheer de president" by Boudewijn de Groot
- "What Are You Fighting For" by Phil Ochs
- "What is Truth" by Johnny Cash
- "What the World Needs Now is Love" by Jackie DeShannon
- "What We're Fighting For" by Dave Dudley
- "What's Going On?" by Marvin Gaye
- "When the Hunter Becomes Hunted" by Tank
- "When the War Is Over" by Cold Chisel
- "When You're Only Nine" by The Toe River Valley Boys
- "Where Are You Now, My Son?" by Joan Baez
- "Where Have All the Flowers Gone?" by Pete Seeger
- "White Boots Marching In A Yellow Land" by Phil Ochs
- "The Willing Conscript" by Tom Paxton
- "Wild Irish Rose" by George Jones [about a homeless, alcoholic Vietnam veteran]
- "The Windows of the World" by Dionne Warwick
- "Wish You Were Here, Buddy" by Pat Boone
- "Wooden Ships" by Crosby, Stills, Nash, and Young
- "Working for the Yankee Dollar" by The Skids

== X ==
- "Xác ta xác thù" - Trịnh Công Sơn
- "Xmas in February" by Lou Reed
- "Xuân Chiến Khu" – Xuân Hồng (about spring and happiness in communist military camps)

== Y ==
- "Yellow River" by Christie
- "A Young Man's Problem" by The Young Men
- "Youngstown" by Bruce Springsteen
- "Young Man" by Styx
- "Your Flag Decal Won't Get You Into Heaven Anymore" by John Prine
- "Your Heart Belongs To Me" by The Supremes & The Velvelettes
- "Yours Is No Disgrace" by Yes (Anderson has stated that the theme of the song was recognition that the kids fighting the war had no choice but to fight and that the war wasn't their fault)
- "Young Men Dead" by The Black Angels

== See also ==
- List of anti-war songs
- Songs and poetry of Soviet servicemen deployed to Vietnam
- Vietnam War
