= Vietnam music =

Vietnam music, Vietnamese music, Vietnam songs or Vietnamese songs may refer to the following:

== Vietnam War ==
- List of songs about the Vietnam War, songs depicting life and political system during the war
  - Fortunate Son, famous American anti-war song during the war
- Songs and poetry of Soviet servicemen deployed to Vietnam
- Vietnam War Song Project, private organization that archives and analyze Vietnamese War songs

== Culture ==
- Music of Vietnam
- Traditional Vietnamese musical instruments
- Sing My Song Vietnam
