= Shrubb =

Shrubb is a surname. Some notable people with the surname include:

- Alfred Shrubb (1879–1964), English distance runner
- Paul Shrubb (1955–2020), English footballer, coach, and scout

Notable people with the related surname Shrubbs include:

- Joyce Shrubbs (1927–2021), British military officer

Shrubb can also refer to Shrubb, a monster from My Singing Monsters

== See also ==
- Shrub (disambiguation)
