= Song poetry (disambiguation) =

Song poetry is poetry of the Chinese Song dynasty (sometimes referred to as the "Sung Dynasty" in older sources).

It may also refer to:

- Song poem, song lyrics set to music for a fee in 20th century North America
- Sung poetry, poetry that is sung
