= Shrub (disambiguation) =

A shrub is a small-to-medium-sized perennial woody plant.

Shrub or Shrubs may also refer to:

== Music ==
- Shrub (band), American reggae, rock and rap band
- The Shrubs, English rock music group
- Shrubs (American band), American rock 'n roll band

== Other uses ==
- Shrub (drink), two different, but related, acidulated beverages
- Shrub, nickname for president George W. Bush

== See also ==
- Shrubb, surname (including a list of people with the name)
