= Gene Merlino =

American singer (1928–2024)

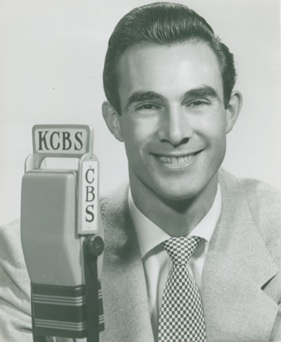
- Publicity photo for KCBS Radio, 1952
- Born: April 5, 1928; San Francisco, California, U.S.
- Died: January 8, 2024 (aged 95); Camarillo, California, U.S.
- Occupations: Singer, Musician (Saxophone, Clarinet)
- Years active: 1950–2005
- Spouse: Lois Draper (m. 1953–2009)
- Children: 2

Mario Gino Merlino (April 5, 1928 – January 8, 2024) was an American singer and musician known professionally as Gene Merlino, and most recognized for providing the singing voice of Lancelot in the musical film Camelot, for being part of the Grammy Award winning quartet, The Anita Kerr Singers, and for being a prolific singer of song poems.

== Early life ==
Gene Merlino was born Mario Gino Merlino on April 5, 1928, in San Francisco, California, to Cesare and Teresa (née Incaviglia) Merlino. His first exposure to music came from his two older brothers; John was an accomplished accordionist, and Victor took up the clarinet but did not stick with it for long. Gene originally wanted to play trumpet, as he admired Harry James, but instead picked up the available clarinet in his early teens. A few years later he had learned the saxophone well enough to start playing for dances and weddings near his Potrero Hill neighborhood.

After graduating from Mission High School he enrolled in San Francisco State as a Music major, playing clarinet and achieving first chair concertmaster in the college's symphonic band by his sophomore year. He also spent one semester at Eastman School of Music.

== Career ==
=== Radio ===
In 1950, Merlino left San Francisco State before graduating (he would eventually graduate with a music degree from San Fernando Valley State College in 1961) when he got his first steady musical job with the Bill Weaver show on KCBS radio, which at that time broadcast out of the Palace Hotel in San Francisco. Although he initially only played saxophone, he soon became the regular male vocalist, performing five nights a week. At this time he "realized that singing was going to be [his] main career in music". He stayed with KCBS for three years before moving to Los Angeles, California.

=== Jazz Bands ===
After arriving in Los Angeles, Merlino joined the jazz bands of Frankie Carle, then Ray Anthony. Anthony then started his short-lived television variety show, The Ray Anthony Show, in 1956, allowing Merlino to be seen by a nationwide audience. When the Anthony show was canceled in May 1957 after only one season, Merlino joined the Freddy Martin band, who played regularly at the famous Cocoanut Grove club in the Ambassador Hotel in Los Angeles. Merlino remained with this band until 1963.

=== Television ===
Beginning in 1963 and continuing through 1979, Merlino was a regular performer for many television variety shows, starting with The Red Skelton Show. He would eventually become a regular for The Pearl Bailey Show, The Judy Garland Show, the Carol Burnett Show, The Julie Andrews Hour, the Sonny & Cher Comedy Hour, Donny & Marie, and the Ken Berry Wow Show.

In later years, his vocals could be heard on The Simpsons. He performed the song "Born Free" on the episode "Whacking Day", "South of the Border" on "Kamp Krusty", and "Jellyfish" in "A Star Is Born Again".

=== Studio Recordings and Film ===
In 1956 he provided the singing voice for the character of Tom Robinson Lee, played by John Kerr, in the movie Tea and Sympathy.

In 1964 he was part of the four-man singing group that recorded the theme song for Gilligan's Island. In 1966, Merlino joined the male singing quartet, The Mellomen, with Thurl Ravenscroft, Bill Lee and Bill Cole, after Max Smith retired. In 1969 Merlino and the Mellomen appeared in the Elvis Presley movie, The Trouble With Girls. Thanks to this, Merlino began to get regular work as a session singer in the various recording studios in Hollywood and Los Angeles, eventually singing for thousands of movies, television programs, radio and television commercials, audio recordings, and song poems, during a career that lasted more than 50 years.

His most famous recordings were as part of the Anita Kerr Singers, who won a 1967 Grammy Award (Best Performance by a Vocal Group) for their performance of "A Man and a Woman" (along with a 1969 Edison Award), and for providing the singing voice for the character of Lancelot, played by Franco Nero, in the 1967 movie "Camelot". In 1973 he was part of the chorus who went on a worldwide tour with Burt Bacharach to promote the movie Lost Horizon, for which Bacharach wrote the music.

Additionally, Merlino was part of the "L.A. Voices", who were nominated for a Grammy Award (Best Jazz Vocal Performance - Duo or Group) in 1983 for the Supersax album "Supersax & L.A. Voices". He also claimed to have recorded more than 10,000 song poems, primarily under the pseudonyms Gene Marshall or John Muir, and was featured in the 2003 PBS documentary "Off the Charts".

== Personal life ==
Merlino married Lois Elizabeth Draper on November 18, 1953. Merlino met Draper in the symphonic band at San Francisco State, where she played flute. Almost immediately after marrying they moved to the North Hollywood region of Los Angeles so Gene could foster his singing career, as much more studio recording work was available in Hollywood and Los Angeles than in San Francisco. They had two children, Monica, and John (who was the drummer for Star Trek themed rock band Warp 11). They lived in various parts of Los Angeles until 1995, when they moved to Camarillo, California. Their marriage lasted for 55 years until Lois died on April 3, 2009, at the age of 78.

Merlino died in his home in Camarillo of natural causes on January 8, 2024, at the age of 95. His remains are interred at Holy Cross Cemetery in Colma, California, near his parents, brothers, and sister-in-law.
