= The Sun Died =

Studio album by Ellery Eskelin
- Released: 1996
- Recorded: February 1996
- Genre: Jazz
- Label: Soul Note

Ellery Eskelin chronology
Jazz Trash (1994)	The Sun Died (1996)	Green Bermudas (1996)

The Sun Died is an album by the American saxophonist Ellery Eskelin, released in 1996. He supported it with a North American tour.

== Production ==
Recorded in February 1996, the album is a tribute to the American saxophonist Gene Ammons. Eskelin was backed by Marc Ribot on guitar and Kenny Wollesen on drums.

== Critical reception ==
Professional ratings
Review scores
Source	Rating
AllMusic	4/5 stars
The Encyclopedia of Popular Music	4/5 stars
MusicHound Jazz: The Essential Album Guide	3/5 stars
The News & Observer	3.5/4 stars
The Penguin Guide to Jazz Recordings	3/4 stars

The New York Times said that "Eskelin neither gives Ammons pallid worship, nor does he remake him as some sort of revolutionary: he's simply working with durable blues and gospel melodies that fit his sensibility"; the paper's Ben Ratliff later listed The Sun Died as the second best jazz album of 1996. The Chicago Sun-Times opined that "Eskelin is equally comfortable getting down with the bruising Ammons sound and cutting oblique slices in the soul-jazz firmament."

The Boston Globe stated that Eskelin "is currently the tenor saxophonist to be noticed on the more risk-taking end of the jazz spectrum." DownBeat noted that Eskelin "achieves a stylistic synthesis you'd expect from Joe Lovano or David Murray". The News & Observer concluded that Ribot "is at once primitive bluesman, a mad scientist with the electronic controls and foot pedals and a fan of staccato funk."

== Track listing ==
No.	Title	Length
1.	"Twistin' the Jug"
2.	"The People's Choice"
3.	"Canadian Sunset"
4.	"Out of It"
5.	"Seed Sack"
6.	"Ca' Purange (Jungle Soul)"
7.	"The Sun Died"
8.	"Jivin' Around"
9.	"Precious Memories"
10.	"The Light"
