= An Open Letter to My Teenage Son =

1967 song by Victor Lundberg

Single by Victor Lundberg

from the album An Open Letter
- B-side: "My Buddy Carl"
- Released: September 1967
- Genre: Spoken word
- Length: 4:23
- Label: Liberty
- Songwriters: Victor Lundberg; Robert Thompson; Julia Ward Howe
- Producer: Jack Tracy

"An Open Letter to My Teenage Son" is a spoken-word song performed by American WMAX radio newscaster Victor Lundberg. Released in September 1967, the song was written by Robert R. Thompson and produced by Jack Tracy. The recording of Lundberg's vocals is played over "Battle Hymn of the Republic." It features on Lundberg's only album, "An Open Letter."

== Content and lyrics ==
The song acts as a message to the teenagers and young adults of the 1960s in the United States who were protesting against being drafted and sent to Vietnam in the midst of the Vietnam War. The lyrics touch on hippies, the hippie movement, 1960s counterculture, the summer of love, and the questioning of Christianity and the existence of God by teenagers. The narrator describes the wishes of his son to be judged on his "own personal habits, abilities and goals," questions about whether God is dead, (a question likely a product of the negative events of the time and unheard prayer) to which Lundberg tries to convince his son that "God is a guide, and not a storm trooper," and that the protests and movements are based on "a well intended but unjustifiable misconception" that "created part of the basis of (your) generation's need to rebel against (our) society." One of the biggest themes of the message is draft-card burning, in which Lundberg claims "all past wars have been dirty, immoral, bloody and second-guessed—however, history has shown most of them necessary," and that if his son is doubtful of the principles upon which the U.S. was founded, whether the free enterprise system in this country is worth protecting, of people's freedom of religion, individual endeavors and method of government, he "(doesn't) belong here." The narrator also accuses him of being ungrateful for the "opportunities" this country has given him. Towards the end, Lundberg tells his son that his mother will love him unconditionally, but that Lundberg's love is conditional: if the son should burn his draft card, then he should also burn his birth certificate because Lundberg will disown him.

On the B-side is a 3-minute-41-second song titled "My Buddy Carl," which discusses similar themes and recounts a letter from a war soldier about one of his best friends at the time, over the same instrumental.

== Chart performance and critical reception ==
For the week of November 11, 1967, the record hopped onto the Billboard Hot 100 chart at #84, breaking into the top ten in just 3 weeks, making it one of the dozen or so fastest-climbing records in Hot 100 history up to that point, as well as one of the shortest-lived top ten presences seeing as it spent a total of only six weeks on the chart.

The record sold over one million copies within a month of release and was awarded a gold disc, along with a Grammy Award nomination for Best Spoken Word Recording, losing to Senator Everett McKinley Dirksen's "Gallant Men".

A writer for Cashbox magazine called it an "inspirational narrative with some interesting points to make," but refuted them, saying "the conclusion rings somehow false." Emmanuel Hapsis of KQED wrote "The track is essentially a rambling rant by a random newscaster about long hair, beards, glue-sniffing, whether God is dead, and George Washington," while Douglas Wolk of Slate called it "the ne plus ultra of right-wing spoken-word hits." One of the songwriters, Robert Thompson, was interviewed by Rolling Stone magazine for their second issue in November 1967:

It's based on a letter I wrote to my 17-year old son back in June as a, more or less, series of written discussions we were having, that I had no intention of using for something else. Then Lundberg read it, and suggested we record it just to play for some friends. It was so well received, they suggested we do something further with it. So, we sent it to Jerry La Coursiere of Liberty Records, who was so enthusiastic when we played it on the phone for him, that he insisted we mail it to Liberty immediately. I never once expected anything to come of all this.

The record received criticism as well. William Zinsser wrote an article for Life magazine in January 1968 titled "The Pitfalls of Pop's Pompous Pop-off," and said of the song, "It's not necessary to be a teenage son to be offended by this record, this is something that anybody can hate. This creep has a voice of mushy smugness intoning a set of rigid creeds. It is hard in a mere magazine to convey the sanctimonious roundness of Lundberg's voice. This man does not sound like anyone's father." Zinsser said that the single was unlikely to be purchased by teenage sons or by fathers, and suggested that the record's sales might have come from "being bought by Lt. General Lewis B. Hershey and sent to draft boards across the country."

Lundberg made an appearance on The Ed Sullivan Show on November 12, 1967.

Parts of "An Open Letter To My Teenage Son" were used as the intro for the song "All My Best Friends Are Metalheads" by American band Less Than Jake.

== Response records ==
"An Open Letter" spawned at least ten "response" records, identified by the Vietnam War Song Project.

Most of these spoken-word records all have the father's son write a response to what the father had said. The son's response varies from letter to letter, depending on the nature of the records that are shown here. 

"A Letter to Dad"

Single by Every Father's Teenage Son
- B-side: "Josephine's Song"
- Released: October 1967
- Genre: Spoken word
- Length: 2:53
- Label: Buddah
- Songwriters: Bill Dean; Rob Marshall

=== A Letter to Dad ===
"A Letter to Dad" by the group Every Father's Teenage Son (a play on the name of pop rock band Every Mother's Son) was one of the most notable response records, and the only one to chart on the Hot 100, peaking at number 93 and charting for 4 weeks. It was written by Bill Dean and Rob Marshall.

In "A Letter to Dad," the narrator poses as the teenager in question, politely considers his father's words and clears up misconceptions, such as the question "Is God dead?" The first of claims from the original record that the narrator disagrees with to be brought up is whether war is necessary. "I've spent long hours over this question, and find that I must hold that war is not inevitable," the narrator says, "That man's greatest goal should be to avoid war at all costs—It is not the lack of pride for my country, but an abundance of respect for my fellow man which demands that I must promise myself not to use violence, no matter what." He also cites that anti-war advocates Albert Schweitzer and Mahatma Gandhi motivate his choice to burn his draft card. The song ends with "Dad, it will be you who will have to burn my birth certificate, and though you'll stop calling me son, I'll never stop calling you Dad."

The speech is layered over a guitar track in the key of E major. On the B-side is a song called "Josephine's Song"

A Cashbox writer called the response track "extremely pacifist," and "an open answer deck to reasonable rebuttal," while a Billboard writer described it as, "a well thought-out answer, performed and arranged in the best of taste."

"Letter from a Teenage Son"

Single by Brandon Wade
- Released: November 1967
- Genre: Spoken word
- Length: 2:49
- Label: Philips
- Songwriters: Brandon Wade; M. Sweeney
- Producer: David Carroll

=== Letter from a Teenage Son ===
"Letter from a Teenage Son" was another response track, this time from 16-year-old Brandon Wade. It was written by Wade and M. Sweeney and produced by David Carroll and the Chicago Symphony Orchestra, who provided the instrumental for the track. (supposedly "Pavane pour une infante défunte" by Maurice Ravel, as it had been commonly credited, though the two sound nothing alike).

The much more gloomy sounding song gives a more raw, open, and rather harsh response to the message, where the narrator frustratingly questions his father's idea of what love is; "How can you even speak of love when you don't seem to understand that the very first step in giving love is to accept someone as he is, not as you would like him to be?", claims that he doesn't have a "voice in the government" if he is not old enough to vote. "Doesn't the real test of a free nation and its democracy lie in the right of its people to question their government?", Wade also asks. He then disputes that he "(doubts) the principles upon which (the U.S.) was founded," by claiming, "That's not true at all, it's just that I doubt some of our new founded principles," ending off with "Please, Dad, don't let the sound of taps deaden the lips of those millions of Americans who believe in their country's right to ask 'why?'"

A Cashbox writer called this one a "dramatically read, intelligently worded, beautifully orchestrated, stunning recording, presenting a mature reply that could well steal the spotlight from other retorts from the younger generation—demands a listen."

Wade cracked number 120 on Billboard's Bubbling Under Hot 100.

=== Other recordings ===
- "A Teenager's Answer" by Keith Gordon (Tower 383)
- "A Teenager's Open Letter to His Father" by Robert Tamlin (Date 2-1610)
- "Hi, Dad (An Open Letter to Dad)" by Dick Clair (Imperial 66272)
- "An Open Letter to My Father" by Bob Random (Dagonet DG-009)
- "Dear Dad" by Michael Paul (Carole CAR-1005)
- "An Open Letter to Dad" by Chris Howard (Carole CAR-1005)

The following spoken-word records are similar to the ones that involve the son's response. In those records, they show other people make their own responses in account of not only the son, but also society in general at the time.

- "An Open Letter to My Dad" by Marceline (Ion 102). This is the only "response" record recited by a woman, who portrays the father's daughter writing a letter on the behalf of her disowned brother.
- "Open Letter to the Older Generation" by Dick Clark (Dunhill 4112). This record does not express support or opposition to war, nor does it involve a response from the son. Instead, Clark pleads to the older generation to show a greater understanding for their sons and daughters and be proud of them regardless of what happens.
