= Ellery Eskelin =

American tenor saxophonist

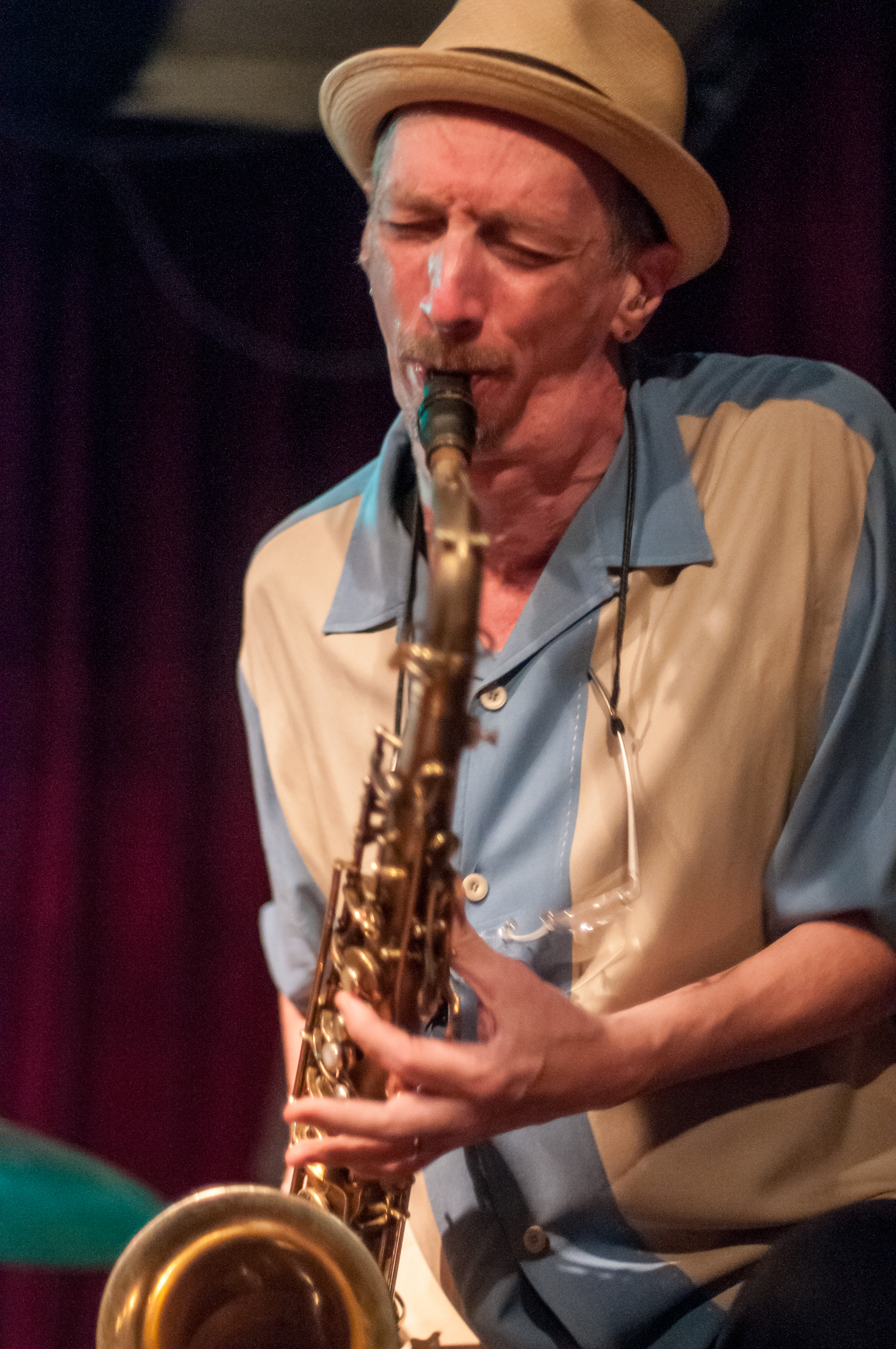
- Eskelin at the Cornelia Street Cafe in Greenwich Village, New York City, 2012

Background information
- Born: August 16, 1959 (age 67); Wichita, Kansas, U.S.
- Genre: Jazz
- Occupation: Musician
- Instrument: Saxophone
- Website: www.elleryeskelin.com

Ellery Eskelin (born August 16, 1959) is an American tenor saxophonist raised in Baltimore, Maryland and residing in New York City. His parents, Rodd Keith and Bobbie Lee, were both professional musicians.

Eskelin has resided in New York City since 1983 and has led numerous international touring ensembles while participating as a sideman or collaborator in various contexts. He has released more than twenty-five recordings as a leader since the late 1980s, primarily for the Swiss hatOLOGY label. His most important work has been with the group he formed in 1994 featuring keyboardist Andrea Parkins and drummer Jim Black as well as a later group called "Trio New York" with organist Gary Versace and drummer Gerald Cleaver. Eskelin has maintained lasting musical associations with Joey Baron, Mark Helias, Gerry Hemingway, Marc Ribot, David Liebman, Han Bennink, Sylvie Courvoisier, Bobby Previte and Daniel Humair among others.

Eskelin's style has its roots in the jazz realm yet his unique phrasing (which is compared to Arnold Schoenberg's technique of "klangfarbenmelodie" in The Wire, December 1996) and the unorthodox techniques utilized in his compositions (in which composed and improvised elements often collide unpredictably) make for a music that defies easy categorization. Over the years, Eskelin has garnered significant critical praise in the international jazz press. 'Down Beat magazine has recognized him as "a major player in today's creative music" (September 1995) and described his compositional approach as "a startlingly new concept" (January 1997).

== Early years ==
Eskelin’s father Rodd Keith (born Rodney Keith Eskelin) died in 1974 in Los Angeles, California, and became a cult figure after his death in the little-known field of "song-poem" music. His mother Bobbie Lee was an organist who performed in local nightclubs in Baltimore in the early 1960s and provided Eskelin an introduction to standards from the Great American Songbook as well as inspiring an early interest in jazz music. Eskelin had little contact with his father after his parents separated during his childhood.

Ellery Eskelin began playing tenor saxophone in 1969 at the age of ten. His early influences included Gene Ammons, Sonny Stitt, Lee Konitz, Stan Getz and John Coltrane. His mother learned to play music in the Pentecostal church as a teenager, the influence of which carried over into her playing of secular music and also provided a strong and lasting influence on Eskelin. Her playing was characterized by a strong rhythmic feel and a commanding delivery of American songs. Eskelin's grandfather was the musical director of the church and played the pedal steel guitar in services while performing on the electric guitar professionally in Baltimore during the late 1940s and early 1950s.

Baltimore had a rich musical legacy sustained by musicians such as saxophonists Mickey Fields and Gary Bartz. Musicians from New York often passed through Baltimore to perform on the weekly Sunday afternoon Left Bank Jazz Society concert series presented at the Famous Ballroom. Eskelin had opportunities to sit in with locals such as Fields as well as internationally renowned artists such as Bartz, Pepper Adams and Woody Shaw. Early performances as a leader took place at various jazz clubs such as "The Bandstand" and "The Closet" run by saxophonist and entrepreneur Henry Baker, who had a long history in the Baltimore music scene having known Lester Young, Cannonball Adderley, Miles Davis, Red Garland, John Coltrane, Clifford Brown and many others. Baker predicted that the young saxophonist would one day become "a great tenor saxophone player". At around this same time Eskelin met drummer Harold White (formerly with Horace Silver) and began performing regularly in White's quintet along with trumpeter Tom Williams.

Eskelin attended Towson University where he studied classical saxophone with Joseph Briscuso and performed in composer Hank Levy's Jazz Ensemble which played Levy's "odd-meter" big band compositions exclusively. Bassist Drew Gress was a fellow student with whom Eskelin continues to collaborate and perform with to the present day. In 1979 Eskelin met pianist Marc Copland and joined Copland's band for engagements in Washington D.C. including the Cellar Door, Blues Alley and the One Step Down. Copland was a former New York saxophonist who moved to Washington DC and switched to piano in order to more deeply explore the role of harmony in his own music. Eskelin, along with Drew Gress, would reunite with Copland years later in New York City in one of Eskelin's early groups as a leader. Also in 1979 Eskelin encountered bay area saxophonist Mel Ellison who was performing in Baltimore for an extended engagement with trumpeter Ted Curson's group. Eskelin took an informal lesson with Ellison, whose unique style made a lasting impression. Also in this group was drummer Tom Rainey, who in subsequent years Eskelin would tour and record with as part of bassist Mark Helias' ensemble.

== 1980s ==
From late 1981 until early 1983 Eskelin toured with swing-era trombonist Buddy Morrow in a big band setting performing one-nighters across the United States and culminating in a tour of South America in early 1983. In March 1983 he left the road tour and moved to New York City taking any kind of musical work available in order to make a living. In an effort to deepen his understanding of be-bop Eskelin attended nightly informal jam sessions for several years at a local club called the "Star Cafe" on 23rd Street and Seventh Avenue in Manhattan. These sessions were run by saxophonist Junior Cook and drummer Harold White (who Eskelin had first met and performed with in Baltimore). In addition Eskelin pursued private studies with saxophonist George Coleman. During the summer of 1984 Eskelin joined organist Jack McDuff's band (which featured guitarist Dave Stryker and drummer Joe Dukes) on a regular engagement at Dudes Lounge in Harlem.

By 1985 Eskelin slowly began to develop his own musical approach, combining his roots in jazz with his interests in other forms of music, particularly free improvisation. Laying the groundwork for these explorations were studies with saxophonist David Liebman which led to informal jam sessions and eventually a working professional relationship. In 1987 Eskelin began developing original music with drummer Phil Haynes leading to the formation of the cooperative group "Joint Venture" (with trumpeter Paul Smoker and bassist Drew Gress) as well as numerous other projects centered around Haynes' Brooklyn loft and rehearsal space. Along with a group of like-minded musicians they presented a number of annual self-produced festivals in Manhattan at the Knitting Factory which ran into the early 1990s. These performances and subsequent recordings by these groups led to Eskelin's initial exposure on the European touring circuit.

== 1990s ==
Eskelin began touring Europe regularly with drummer Joey Baron's group "Baron Down", a trio including Baron, Eskelin and trombonist Steve Swell (and later trombonist Josh Roseman). Baron Down released three recordings: Tongue in Groove (1991), Raised Pleasure Dot (1993) and Crack Shot (1996). At this time Eskelin abandoned commercially oriented work in order to concentrate fully on his own projects and the music of like-minded colleagues. During a three-month period in 1991 he developed a solo saxophone concert program in complete musical isolation, opting not to perform or interact with any other musicians during this time. In addition to entirely revamping his approach to the saxophone the process proved to be a catalyst for musical ideas that Eskelin further developed and applied to his compositions for the group he formed in 1994, "Ellery Eskelin with Andrea Parkins and Jim Black". This group, featuring Parkins on accordion and electronics and Black on percussion released "Jazz Trash" in 1995 and followed up with a dozen recordings over the ensuing decade and into the 2000s primarily for the Swiss-based Hat Hut label. In the liner notes to "One Great Day..." (the band's second release) Eskelin explains that the fractured and sometimes incongruent nature of his experiences as a musician coming up in the 1970s and 1980s finally came together in a manner that made sense and could be expressed in a unified musical language with this ensemble. The group toured regularly in Europe, the U.S. and Canada and continues, having performed in Europe as recently as 2010.

One of Eskelin's most acclaimed recordings in the 1990s was The Sun Died, a project based upon music by (and associated with) saxophonist Gene Ammons. The format was unusual, utilizing saxophone, guitar (Marc Ribot) and drums (Kenny Wolleson). The New York Times characterized The Sun Died as "a remarkable record" and chose it as one of the Top 10 Recordings of 1996.

== 2000s ==
Throughout the first decade of the 2000s Eskelin focused primarily on his group with Andrea Parkins and Jim Black, touring and recording, occasionally augmenting the band with additional musicians such as vocalist Jessica Constable, keyboardist Philippe Gelda, cellist Erik Friedlander, tubist Joseph Daley, guitarist Marc Ribot and bassist Melvin Gibbs. Additionally, Eskelin continued to maintain long-time musical relationships established in the 1990s, touring and recording with bassist Mark Helias (recordings include Open Loose, Fictionary, Loopin' the Cool), drummer Gerry Hemingway ("Johnny's Corner Song", "Devil's Paradise", "Songs", "The Whimbler", "Riptide"), drummer Han Bennink ("Dissonant Characters"), drummer Bobby Previte ("Set the Alarm for Monday") and drummer Daniel Humair (Liberté Surveilé). Eskelin also forged new ties with musicians from around the globe such as oud player Rabih Abou-Khalil, pianist Satoko Fujii, trumpeter Dennis González, clarinetist Ben Goldberg, bassist Lisle Ellis, pianist Erik Deutsch and drummer John Hollenbeck. Eskelin also made a guest artist appearance on the BBC Electric Proms Festival in London with the Basquiat Strings in 2007. In 2009 Eskelin was the recipient of a Chamber Music America "New Jazz Works" grant which commissioned an extended work for the group "Different But the Same", a quartet with fellow saxophonist David Liebman.

During this time Eskelin also continued launching new projects of his own (leaning towards complete improvisation) such as "Vanishing Point", a group-improvised recording from 2000 with Mat Maneri (viola), Erik Friedlander (cello), Mark Dresser (bass) and Matt Moran (vibraphone). An improvising trio of cellist Vincent Courtois, pianist Sylvie Courvoisier and Eskelin was formed in 2002 and recorded "As Soon as Possible" in 2008.

== 2010–present ==
In 2011 Eskelin formed "Trio New York" with Hammond B3 organist Gary Versace and drummer Gerald Cleaver. A renewed interest in the early history of the saxophone (sparked by his switch to a vintage instrument in 2009) has invigorated Eskelin's musical aesthetic. Trio New York incorporates standard material from the Great American Songbook (much of the repertoire being inspired by his mother, organist Bobbie Lee) in a freely improvised setting. In comparing the group's eponymous recording to an earlier project by Eskelin devoted to the music of saxophonist Gene Ammons (The Sun Died, 1996), reviewer Ed Hazel wrote: "If anything, Trio New York is both subtler and more adventurous, more at home with the music and less self conscious about taking liberties with it." The group has released three recordings, Trio New York, Trio New York II and Trio Willisau Live, this most recent release being a live recording from the Willisau Festival in 2015 and featuring Gerry Hemingway on the drums. The UK based Wire Magazine wrote of this project, “There’s a whole history of jazz in these richly rewarding performances.”

In 2013 Eskelin released a new recorded project for clean feed records entitled Mirage, improvisations with Susan Alcorn (pedal steel guitar) and Michael Formanek (double bass). Eskelin remarked that he was interested in exploring the "expressive range of the saxophone that is perhaps most associated with its beginnings" and that his objective is to "bring that type of lyricism to the language of contemporary improvised music." Continuing with this idea, in the liner notes to his 2015 release Solo Live at Snugs on hatOLOGY records, Eskelin discusses a revamped approach to solo saxophone performance, updating his 1992 release Premonition - Solo Tenor Saxophone in which he compares the two projects by saying “As opposed to reimagining my instrument I’m very much interested in the essence of a saxophone as being just what it is, a saxophone.”

In 2016 Eskelin was interviewed by the web based music journal “Point of Departure” in which he conveyed his increasing advocacy of acoustic (non-amplified) performance in humanistic, if not spiritual terms, also expressing concern about the effect of technology on the artistic experience as well as the potential disruption of personal and community engagement. Expanding on his thoughts regarding music and spirituality, Eskelin (a formal practitioner of Zen Buddhism) was interviewed in the book “Spirits Rejoice!: Jazz and American Religion” by Jason Bivins.

From 2015 until 2019 Eskelin maintained a working ensemble including bassist Christian Weber (from Zürich) and Michael Griener on drums (based in Berlin). The group performed acoustically (no microphones on stage and bassist Weber opting not to use an amplifier) performing freely improvised music juxtaposed with early jazz classics by composers such as Scott Joplin, Jelly Roll Morton and Fats Waller. The trio recorded for the Swiss Intakt label having released “Sensations of Tone” in 2017 followed by "The Pearls" in 2019. In 2026 Eskelin released a live solo saxophone recording titled “Across Breath, Voice, Silence”, writing in the notes to this release that the years leading up to this recording had been devoted to private practice and listening exclusively to live chamber music concerts in New York City given the communal nature of experiencing un-amplified music.

== Discography ==
=== As leader ===
- Across Breath, Voice, Silence (Hat Hut / ezz-thetics Now Series 2026)
- The Pearls (Intakt 2019)
- Sensations of Tone (Intakt 2017)
- Trio Willisau Live (hatOLOGY 2016)
- Solo Live at Snugs (hatOLOGY 2015)
- Mirage (Clean Feed, 2013)
- Trio New York II (prime source 2013)
- Trio New York (prime source 2011)
- One Great Night...Live (hatOLOGY 2009)
- Every So Often (prime source 2008)
- Quiet Music (prime source 2006)
- Ten (hatOLOGY 2004)
- Arcanum Moderne (hatOLOGY 2002)
- 12 (+1) Imaginary Views (hatOLOGY 2001)
- Vanishing Point (hatOLOGY 2000)
- The Secret Museum (hatOLOGY 1999)
- Ramifications (hatOLOGY 1999)
- Dissonant Characters (hatOLOGY 1998)
- Five Other Pieces (+2) (hatOLOGY 1998)
- Kulak 29 & 30 (hatOLOGY 1997)
- One Great Day (hatOLOGY 1996)
- The Sun Died (Soul Note, 1996)
- Green Bermudas (Eremite, 1996)
- Jazz Trash (Song Lines 1994)
- Premonition - solo tenor saxophone (prime source 1992)
- Figure of Speech (Soul Note 1991)
- Forms (Open Minds 1990)
- Setting the Standard (Cadence Jazz 1988)

=== As sideman ===
- A Lincoln Portrait – Mikel Rouse Broken Consort (Cuneiform, 1988)
- Joint Venture – Joint Venture (Enja, 1987)
- Ways – Joint Venture (Enja, 1990)
- Mirrors – Joint Venture (Enja, 1993)
- Tongue in Groove – Joey Baron's Baron Down (JMT, 1991)
- RAIsedpleasuredot – Joey Baron's Baron Down (New World, 1994)
- Big Band Record – Ray Anderson with the George Gruntz Concert Jazz Band (Gramavision, 1994)
- Crackshot – Joey Baron's Baron Down (Avant, 1995)
- Loopin' the Cool – Mark Helias (Enja, 1996)
- Come Ahead Back – Mark Helias (Koch, 1998)
- Fictionary – Mark Helias (GM, 1998)
- Johnny's Corner Song – Gerry Hemingway (Auricle, 1998)
- The Cactus of Knowledge – Rabih Abou-Khalil (Enja, 2001)
- Devil's Paradise – Gerry Hemingway (Clean Feed, 2003)
- The Whimbler – Gerry Hemingway (Clean Feed, 2005)
- Songs – Gerry Hemingway (Between the Lines, 2009)
- Riptide – Gerry Hemingway (Clean Feed, 2011)
- Set the Alarm for Monday – Bobby Previte (Palmetto, 2008)
- Dance of the Soohsayer's Tongue – Dennis González NY Quartet (Clean Feed, 2011)
- Midnight Suite – Dennis Gonzalez NY Quartet (Clean Feed, 2011)
- September Trio – Harris Eisenstadt (Clean Feed, 2011)
- Dirigo Rataplan – Devin Gray (Skirl Records, 2012)
- The Destructive Element – Harris Eisenstadt (Clean Feed, 2013)
- Liberte Surveile – Daniel Humair (Sketch, 2002)
- Trust – Jozef Dumoulin and the Red Hill Orchestra (Yolk, 2014)
- Rhombal – Stephan Crump (Papillion Sounds, 2016)
- Dirigo Rataplan II – Devin Gray (Rataplan Records, 2018)
- Live 1987 – Mikel Rouse Broken Consort (ExitMusic Recordings, 2022)

== Filmography ==
- On the Road with Ellery Eskelin w/Andrea Parkins & Jim Black (prime source DVD release 2004)
- Off the Charts - The Song Poem Story (PBS Television Broadcast 2003, Shout Factory DVD)
