= Rodd Keith =

American songwriter

Rodd Keith (born Rodney Keith Eskelin; January 30, 1937 – December 15, 1974) was an American multi-instrumentalist and songwriter. He is perhaps the best known figure in the obscure musical subgenre known as song poem music.

== Life and career ==
He worked for several companies active in the song poem business, a practice also known as song sharking, and generally dismissed as a scam.

Keith recorded hundreds of musical compositions based around lyrics sent in to song-poem companies by amateur songwriters, based upon small ads in the backs of mass market magazines promising success in the profitable field of songwriting. After a letter was sent by the company, the amateur songwriters would then be convinced to pay the company a fee to have a recording made and records pressed. Keith sang on many of these recordings as well as playing several different instruments, including saxophone, melodica, and keyboards. His earliest song-poem work was made for Sandy Stanton's Film City label, in which he would build the entire track using a Chamberlin keyboard.

During the late 1960s he had his most prolific period working for Clarence Freed's Preview Records label in Los Angeles. Keith masterminded recording sessions for hundreds of 45s and dozens of albums, working with singers Teri Thornton, Charlotte O'Hara, and Nita Garfield (who used "noms de disque" Teri Summers/Teri Marsh/Terri North, Bonnie Graham, and Nita Craig respectively). Thornton, a promising jazz vocalist in the late 1950s and early 1960s, had fallen on hard times, while the latter two were ambitious singers and songwriters who had had material recorded in the C&W and R&B markets.

Keith, who was born into a religious household and was even a musical evangelist for a time, fell in with a hard-living crowd in Los Angeles during the late 1960s and early 1970s, experimenting with psychedelic drugs. According to the Los Angeles Times, he was seen "leaping or falling from an overcrossing onto the Hollywood Freeway" to his death in the early morning hours of December 15, 1974. It has been suggested that this was a suicidal act, but Keith's heavy drug use at this time has led others to claim it was an accident.

In the 1990s, record collectors who seek out old vinyl recordings rediscovered these obscure discs. Several compilations of these songs were released on compact disc, including several which featured the work of Keith exclusively. Keith's son, jazz saxophonist Ellery Eskelin, provided commentary on these releases. Although Eskelin never actually met his father, he was told by many people that he was some kind of musical genius. Keith once remarked that he spelled "Rodd" with two d's because "God only used one." This American Life aired an interview with Eskelin about his relationship with his father's works in August 1997.

== Partial discography ==
- I Died Today, Rodd Keith (Tzadik Records)
- Ecstacy To Frenzy, Rodd Keith (Tzadik)
- Saucers in the Sky, Rodd Keith (Roaratorio)
- My Pipe Yellow Dream, Rodd Keith (Roaratorio)
- Black Phoenix Blues, Rodd Keith (Roaratorio)
