= Norridge Mayhams =

- Also known as: Norris the Troubadour
- Born: Norridge Bryant Mayhams; August 17, 1903; Georgetown, South Carolina, U.S.
- Died: July 22, 1988 (aged 84) Norwalk, Connecticut, U.S.
- Genres: Jazz, swing, pop, novelty songs
- Occupations: Singer, songwriter, bandleader, record company owner
- Instruments: Vocals, guitar, banjo
- Years active: 1930s–1980s
- Labels: Decca, ARC, Melotone, Co-Ed, Mayhams, Mayhams Collegiate
- Formerly of: The Blue Chips; The Hipp Cats; The Barbecue Boys; The Seaboard Coastliners

Norridge Bryant Mayhams (August 17, 1903 – July 22, 1988) was an American singer, songwriter, bandleader, and record producer, whose recordings between the 1930s and 1980s covered a wide range of genres including jazz, gospel, R&B, and novelty songs. He used a variety of performing names, most notably Norris the Troubadour, and released many of his recordings on his own independent record labels. His best known song as a writer, "We'll Build a Bungalow", was a chart hit for Johnny Long in 1950, and was performed by Lucille Ball and Desi Arnaz in I Love Lucy. According to one source, "Mayhams authored a body of work that is staggering in its scope, quality and general strangeness."

== Biography ==
An African-American, Mayhams was born in Georgetown, South Carolina. He was a ship's cook for several years, and learned to play the guitar and banjo before returning to New York City where he worked as a porter. By the late 1920s he also worked as a musician, according to his own account played banjo in one of Chick Webb's early bands, and appeared regularly on radio station WMCA. His radio program led to club appearances, and also to bookings in colleges around the country. His earliest recordings were made in New York in 1936, with his own small group, and were credited variously to The Blue Chips, The Hipp Cats, and Norridge Mayhams and His Barbecue Boys. They included gospel tracks such as "Crying Holy Unto The Lord" alongside hokum such as "Let's Get Drunk and Truck" (originally by The Harlem Hamfats). His recordings in the 1930s were released on various labels including Decca, ARC and Melotone.

His tours led to him writing songs for colleges. Increasingly billing himself as Norris the Troubadour, and using members of his family including his wife Shirley and daughter Betty as singers, often credited as the Little Blue Chips, he began subsidizing his own recordings. Around 1942 he and Betty wrote a morale-building song, "We'll Build A Bungalow (With War Bonds And Stamps)," which he revised after the end of World War II as "We'll Build A Bungalow (You Spell It For Two)". The song was recorded by Johnny Long in 1949. It became a minor chart hit, reaching number 22 on the Billboard pop chart. It was later recorded by Sy Oliver, and a version was performed as a vaudeville duet on the I Love Lucy show in 1952 by Lucille Ball and Desi Arnaz. In 1966, the song was featured in the film The Group.

In 1943, Mayhams worked with Gypsy Rose Lee. He established his own record label, at first called Co-Ed Records and then, because the name was already taken by another company, Mayhams Records, later Mayhams Collegiate Records. He also set up a song publishing company, Sorority Fraternity. In the late 1940s, Mayhams recorded with saxophonist and bandleader Carl Bostic (apparently not Earl Bostic as sometimes reported), and in 1947 he published a booklet, Experiences of a Collegiate Singer.

Although the precise dates of many of his records are obscure, partly because his use of serial numbers did not follow a set pattern, Mayhams issued a succession of recordings of his own songs from the 1950s. Although he and his family appeared on some, many were produced using the song poem system, through which Mayhams submitted his lyrics to a commercial company who then recorded them using their own singers. Sometimes credited as Norris the Troubadour, though not always sung by Mayhams, they were then made available on Mayhams' own labels.

As well as college songs, he wrote songs about drinking, and on a wide range of topical matters including dance crazes and the Vietnam War. Occasionally, the two sides of his records presented an odd juxtaposition, such as in the record "Jesus Will Soon Be Coming" backed by "You're My Surfer Girl Forever." Other titles recorded by Mayhams included "Yamtang Yamtang Rankytang (No Meat Sweet Potatoe Swing)"; "My Christmas Time Philosophy; Theme Of The Apostropheis" (previously published as "I Want A Coed By My Side"); "Zoomba High Kicka Zoomba"; "Rock N' Rollin' Honey (You Left Me Baby Cause I Had No Money)"; and "I'am Back From Vietnam (Hold The Elevator My Baby Is Coming Down)". The spelling and punctuation of many of his titles were unorthodox.

In 1962, he helped set up another record label, Brandes. In later years, Mayhams used the group name The Seaboard Coastliners on many of his records, including a disco-style remake of "We'll Build A Bungalow (Big Enough For Two) (You Spell It For Two)" in 1979. In 1976, he released a compilation double LP of some of his songs, Our Centennial Album [sic], recorded over several years. After the death of his wife in 1977, and those of two of his sons in 1979 and 1981, Mayhams wound down his recording career.

Mayhams died in Norwalk, Connecticut, in 1988, aged 84.

== Reissues ==
In 1996, archive company Document Records issued a CD of his 1930s recordings, Norridge Mayhams & The Blue Chips – Complete Recorded Works In Chronological Order. A CD version of Our Centennial Album was issued in 2004.
