= Huy Du =

Vietnamese composer (1926–2007)

- Also known as: Huy Du
- Born: Nguyen Huy Du; 1 December 1926; Bac Ninh, Vietnam
- Died: 17 December 2007 (aged 81)

Huy Du, full name Nguyen Huy Du (1 December 1926 – 17 December 2007) was a Vietnamese musician specializing in red music, for songs such as The road we go, I still act. army, Ignite you, ... and the musical composition of the South of my homeland (written for Violin and Piano).

== Career ==
Du was known for his revolutionary songs, praising the Vietnam Communist Party. He was a recipient of the Hồ Chí Minh Prize in 2000.
