= Joyce Shrubbs =

British military officer (1927–2021)

- Born: Joyce Taylor; 6 April 1927 near Swineshead, Bedfordshire, UK
- Died: 2 July 2021 (aged 94); Flitwick, Bedfordshire, UK
- Occupations: Royal Observer Corps officer; Assistant Commandant; Observer Captain
- Years active: 1944–1992

Joyce Shrubbs MBE (1927–2021) joined the British military Royal Observer Corps in 1944 and retired in 1992 as its Assistant Commandant with the rank of Observer Captain. She was the only woman officer to ever hold this senior rank in the organization.

== Early and family life ==
Joyce Taylor was born on 6 April 1927. She had five siblings and the family lived on a farm near Swineshead in Bedfordshire. One older brother was killed in an air attack in 1940 and this encouraged her to join up.

She married George Shrubbs and they had two children. She died 2 July 2021 at a residential home in Flitwick.

== Military career ==
Shrubbs joined the Royal Observer Corps in 1944 when she was 17. She was initially posted to the group headquarters in Bedford, where she worked plotting courses of both allied and hostile aircraft. This work was classified so she was not allowed to talk about what she did. After the end of the Second World War, the Royal Observer Corps was closed down in May 1945, but she re-joined when it re-started in 1947 to address possible nuclear threats from the Cold War. She continued to work part-time for the Royal Observer Corps as an observer officer where the work included modelling and plotting the consequences of nuclear bomb bursts. She became Group Commandant at Bedford and in 1973 was appointed the honorary Women's Personnel Advisor to the Commandant. In 1984 Shrubbs was promoted to an area command covering about one-fifth of the UK extending north from the river Thames to the river Tees, and from the east coast of England to the central area of Birmingham. In 1991 she was promoted to Assistant Commandant of the whole organisation with the rank of Observer Captain. She was the only woman to achieve this rank. She retired in 1992.

After retirement she became initially national president of the Royal Observer Corps Association and then vice-president of the Royal Observer Corps Association in 1998.

In 2013 Shrubbs unveiled the Royal Observer Corps memorial stone within the ROC Grove of hawthorns during its dedication ceremony at the National Memorial Arboretum.

Stubbs was involved with the Royal British Legion and by 2015 she was vice-president for Bedfordshire.

== Accountancy career ==
She provided part-time accountancy and secretarial services to farms in Bedfordshire for around 70 years.

== Awards ==
In 1975 she was made MBE for her service to the Royal Observer Corps. She was earlier awarded the Royal Observer Corps Medal, with a second clasp in 1981.

In 2015 the East of England Agricultural Society awarded Shrubbs a long service Farm Business Award for 70 years service.
