= Song poem =

Song poems or are songs with lyrics by usually non-professional writers that have been set to music by commercial companies for a fee. The practice is also known as song sharking.

The recording of song poems was widely regarded as disreputable by many professional songwriters and musicians, but was nonetheless conducted by several businesses throughout the 20th century in North America.

== Production and promotion ==
From the early 20th century, the business of recording song poems was promoted through small display ads in popular magazines, comic books, tabloids, men's adventure journals, and similar publications, soliciting lyrics for songs. Those who sent their poetry to one of the production companies usually received notice by mail that their work was worthy of recording by professional musicians, along with a proposal to do so in exchange for a fee. The early 20th century versions of this business involved setting the words to music and printing up sheet music from inexpensively engraved plates.

In producing the recordings, musicians often recorded dozens of songs per recording session using minimal resources. Using a method called "sight-singing," they wrote the music as they read the lyrics and played along, sometimes finishing a song in just one take. Some of the companies recorded new vocals over pre-recorded music backing tracks, using the same music tracks hundreds of times. The recordings were then duplicated on 45 RPM vinyl singles or on individual cassette tapes, or released on compilation LPs with other song poems. Copies of the recording were sent to the customer; promises that they would also be sent to radio stations or music industry executives were rarely, if ever, kept.

== Song poem writers ==
Noted examples of those who have used the song poem approach include:

- Rodd Keith (born Rodney Keith Eskelin, 1937–1974), a prolific composer and performer of song poems who has been described as the "Mozart" of the genre. Several compilations of his song poem recordings have been released on CD with liner notes by his son, avant-garde jazz saxophonist Ellery Eskelin.
- Caglar Juan Singletary, (born 1972) who featured in the 2003 documentary Off The Charts: The Song-Poem Story. His most famous composition is "Annie Oakley", music written by artist David Fox.
- Norridge Mayhams (1903–1988), also known as Norris the Troubadour, who issued a succession of records between the 1930s and 1980s, many produced by song-poem professionals.
- Thomas J. Guygax Sr. (1921–1999), of Springfield, Missouri, a lyricist noted for his unconventional approach to word order and syntax.
- John Trubee (born 1957), whose song "Peace & Love" (commonly known as "Blind Man's Penis"), written to test whether or not a song-poem firm would accept "the most ridiculous, stupid, vile, obscene" lyrics he could write, was recorded by country singer Ramsey Kearney; it has been described as "the most famous song-poem recording of all time". The original lyrics referred to "Stevie Wonder's penis", but Kearney replaced all references to Wonder with the generic phrase "a blind man".

== In media ==
In 2003, the documentary Off The Charts: The Song-Poem Story was aired on PBS. Gene Merlino, who claimed to have sung on more than 10,000 song poems, was featured in the documentary. It has since been released on DVD, and the soundtrack was released on CD.

The 2007 Craig Zobel drama Great World of Sound depicts a modern-day version of "song sharking," and featured scenes where real unsigned musicians audition for the actors portraying the ersatz music producers; these artists ultimately had their songs properly licensed and featured in the finished film.

The Vietnam War Song Project, founded in 2007 by Dr. Justin A. Brummer, has identified 150+ songs poems related to the war, and hundreds covering political topics, including elections, economics, wars, and patriotic / protest sentiments, providing a view into non-professional, public opinions on contemporary events through song.

Tom Ardolino of NRBQ curated an LP and several compilation CDs of material taken from his personal collection (The Beat of The Traps, The Makers of Smooth Music, The Human Breakdown of Absurdity, & I'm Just The Other Woman). His work, along with the efforts of others such as Phil Milstein, musicologist Irwin Chusid of WFMU radio, Mark Mothersbaugh of Devo, Bob Purse, James Lindbloom, and Penn Jillette, has allowed song poems to reach a level of notoriety unthinkable in their own time.

== Discography ==
- Hollywood Gold, various artists (Rainbow Records) (one single, one cassette, 22 LPs)
- MSR Madness series:
  - The Beat of The Traps, Various artists (Carnage Press, LP only)
  - The Makers of Smooth Music, Various artists (Carnage Press)
  - The Human Breakdown of Absurdity, Various artists (Carnage Press)
  - I'm Just The Other Woman, Various artists (Carnage Press)
- The American Song Poem Anthology: Do You Know The Difference Between Big Wood and Brush?, Various artists (Bar/None)
- The American Song Poem Christmas: Daddy, Is Santa Really Six Foot Four?, Various artists (Bar/None)
- I Died Today, Rodd Keith (Tzadik)
- Ecstacy To Frenzy, Rodd Keith (Tzadik)
- Saucers in the Sky, Rodd Keith (Roaratorio)
- My Pipe-Yellow Dream, Rodd Keith (Roaratorio)
- Black Phoenix Blues, Rodd Keith (Roaratorio)
- Off The Charts: The Song Poem Story, Various artists (Red Rock Records - film soundtrack)
- Song Poem Hits of 2007, David Dubowski One Man Band (Crazy Dave Records)
- Song Poem Hits of 2007 Vol. 2, David Dubowski One Man Band (Crazy Dave Records)
- Song Poem Hits of 2009, David Dubowski One Man Band (Crazy Dave Records)
- Vietnam War: Song Poems (Justin A. Brummer, Vietnam War Song Project, 2007)

== Documentary ==
- Off The Charts: The Song-Poem Story at IMDb

== See also ==
- Outsider music
- Songshark
- Vanity press
- Poetry.com
