= Victor Lundberg =

American radio personality

- Born: September 2, 1923
- Died: February 14, 1990 (aged 66)
- Notable work: "An Open Letter to My Teenage Son" (1967)

Victor Lundberg (September 2, 1923, Grand Rapids, Michigan – February 14, 1990) was an American radio personality, best known for a spoken word record called "An Open Letter to My Teenage Son", which became an unlikely Top 10 hit in 1967.

== "An Open Letter to My Teenage Son" ==
Released in September 1967, the song is a voice-over monologue that delivers an orchestral rearrangement of the "Battle Hymn of the Republic", after empathizing, somewhat, with a number of the typical teenage concerns of the day, memorably ends with Lundberg telling his son that if he burns his draft card, then he should "burn [his] birth certificate at the same time. From that moment on, I have no son." The lyrics, written by Robert R Thompson and produced by Jack Tracy. In real life, Lundberg had at least one male teenager in his household at the time.

"An Open Letter" became a hit in Michigan and was released nationally by Liberty Records, jumping onto the Billboard Hot 100 at #84 on November 11, 1967. Within three weeks the record went #58 - #18 - #10, making it one of the dozen or so fastest-climbing records in Hot 100 history up to that point, and Lundberg made an appearance on The Ed Sullivan Show on November 12, 1967. After another week at #10, the record slipped to #22 for the week ending December 16, 1967, then vanished from the Hot 100 completely, after a total run of just six weeks. Few other records have ever been ranked so high in such a short chart stay on the Hot 100 (Napoleon XIV's "They're Coming to Take Me Away, Ha-Haaa!" peaked at #3 but was only on the Hot 100 for six weeks; Kenny G's "Auld Lang Syne" (The Millennium Mix) peaked at #7 but was only the Hot 100 for five weeks) before the spate of records that have been doing so, starting in 2008 (see Biggest drops off the Hot 100 in List of Billboard Hot 100 chart achievements and milestones). However, it sold over one million copies within a month of release and was awarded a gold disc. "An Open Letter" also received a Grammy Award nomination for Best Spoken Word Recording, losing to Senator Everett McKinley Dirksen's "Gallant Men".

Encouraged by the single's success, Liberty released an entire album of Lundberg's musings, entitled An Open Letter later in 1967. The album featured ten selections about hippies, Vietnam War and American patriotism. "My Buddy Carl" (originally the B-side of the hit single) decried racial prejudice.

The record was heavily criticised in a scathing review by William Zinsser, "The Pitfalls of Pop's Pompous Pop-off", in Life Magazine, 5 January 1968. Lundberg released one more record, in 1968: "Take Two (For the Relief of Racial Tension)" b/w "Impressions of Victor Lundberg", on the Buddah label. It was not a hit.

== Later years ==
Lundburg continued his career in radio broadcasting throughout; he voiced a large number of nationally aired commercials (notably, Peter Max commercials), and was an on-air personality part-time, even in retirement. His last regular live radio show ended in 1979 on what was then WYBR, in Belvidere (Rockford), Illinois. Victor Lundburg died in 1990.
