= Hoàng Vân (composer) =

Vietnamese songwriter and composer

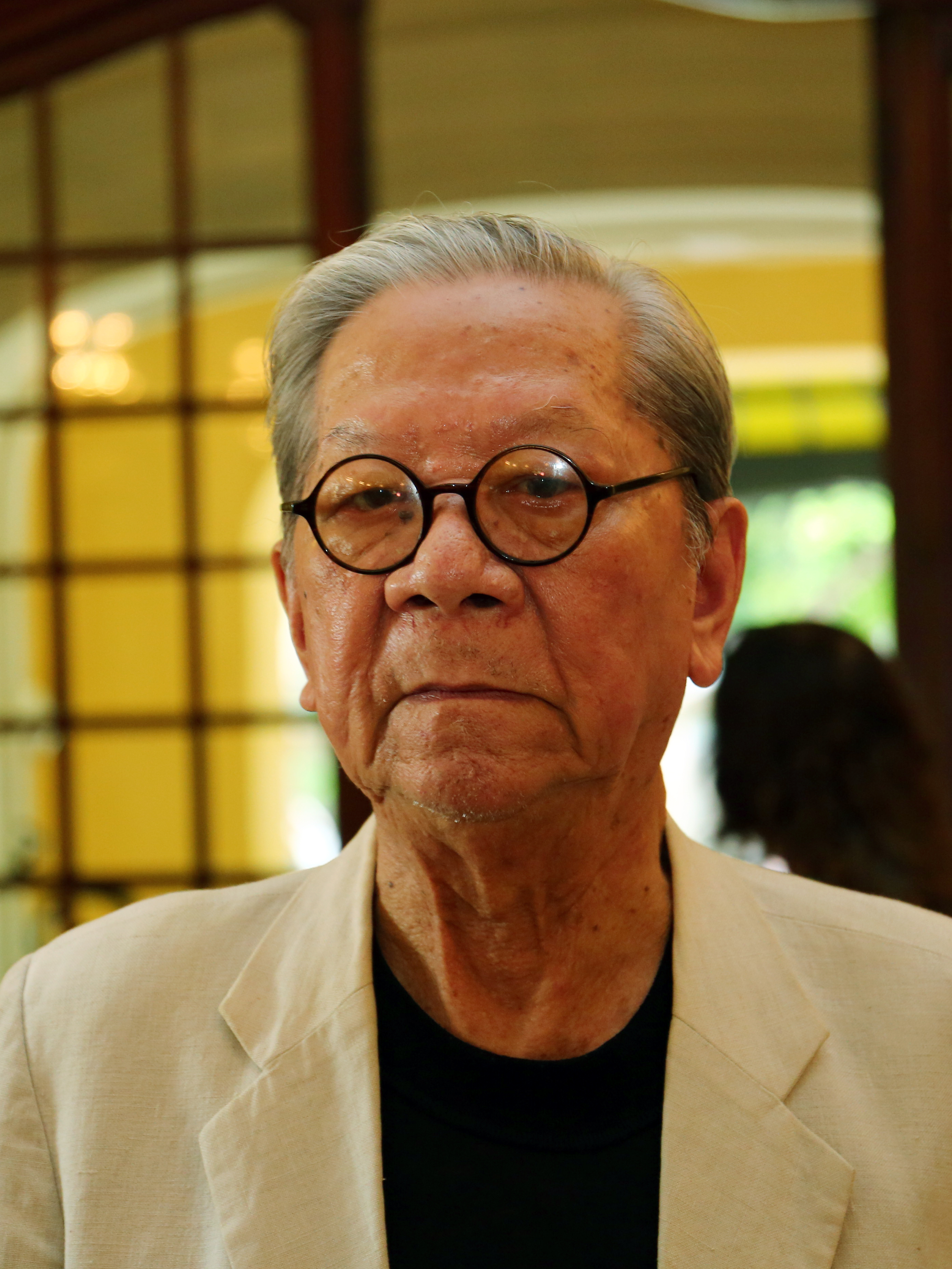

Lê Văn Ngọ, (24 July 1930, Hanoi – 4 February 2018) known as Hoàng Vân, is a Vietnamese songwriter and composer. He was a recipient of the Hồ Chí Minh Prize in 2000.

== Life ==
Born on 24 July 1930 in Hanoi, Ngọ was born into a Confucian family. Both his grandfather and father were Confucian scholars. He is best known as a composer of the two Indochina wars. He was a soldier in Dien Bien Phu before being sent to train in European classical music at the Central Conservatory of Music in Beijing at the end of the war.

After his return to Vietnam, he was the conductor of the Radio Orchestra (Voice of Vietnam), as well as lecturing at the composition faculty of the Ha Noi Conservatory of Music (now the Vietnam National Academy of Music) until 1989. He was also a member of the Vietnam Musicians Association and worked there until 1996.

Hoàng Vân was known by the public through his songs, but he also composed symphonies (notably Thành Đồng Tổ quốc, The Bronze Citadel of my Fatherland), in 1960), choirs, instrumental ensemble, music for films, and plays.

== Works ==
=== Songs ===
Hoàng Vân is one of the most famous composers of Vietnamese songs from the 1960s, and, as of the early 21st century, his songs remain popular among Vietnamese listeners. Among the most widely performed are:

- Bài ca giao thông vận tải
- Bài ca người thủy thủ
- Bài ca người giáo viên nhân dân
- Bài ca xây dựng
- Bài ca pháo kích
- Bài ca tình bạn
- Bài ca trên đường xa
- Bài thơ gửi Thái Nguyên
- Bảy sắc cầu vồng
- Chiến thắng Tây Bắc
- Chiến thắng Hoà Bình
- Chào anh giải phóng quân - chào mùa xuân đại thắng
- Con chim vành khuyên
- Cô gái Thái Bình
- Đường về Tây Nguyên
- Đường lên đỉnh núi
- Em yêu trường em
- Guồng nước quay
- Hát về cây lúa hôm nay
- Hà Nội - Huế - Sài Gòn
- Hai chị em
- Hát ru
- Hò kéo pháo
- Không cho chúng nó thoát
- Mùa hoa phượng nở
- Người chiến sĩ ấy
- Nhớ
- Những cánh buồm
- Nổi trống lên rừng núi ơi
- Quảng Bình quê ta ơi
- Tiếng cồng giải phóng - tiếng cồng chiến thắng
- Tin chiến thắng
- Tình ca Tây Nguyên
- Tình ca Vũng Tàu
- Tình yêu Hà Nội
- Tình yêu của đất và nước
- Tôi là người thợ lò
- Tuổi trẻ đi xa

=== Music for cinema ===
Con chim vành khuyên

Vĩ tuyến 17 ngày và đêm

Nổi gió

Em bé Hà Nội

Mối tình đầu...

=== Ballet ===
Chị Sứ

=== Symphonies ===
Thành đồng tổ quốc (1960), Bronze castle (poème symphonique), N°1

Điện Biên Phủ, symphonie with choral (2004), Reminiscence II or 5th symphony, 3 mouvements, N°4

Symphonie pour les soldats N°2, 4 mouvements, 1991 (unpublished)

Poème symphonique N°3, end of 1990's (unpublished)

Sinfonia Lyrica N°5, 2010,(unpublished)

=== Music for theater ===
Nila

=== Choral, works for orchestra ===
Hồi tưởng,

Việt Nam muôn năm

Vượt núi

Tuổi lên mười

Hát dưới cờ búa liềm

Thành phố chúng ta nhà máy chúng ta...

=== Chamber music ===
Fugue for piano

Suite for hautboy and piano

Rhapsodie cho violon

Solo for basson "Hành khúc con voi" (elephant marche),

Solo for flute "Vui được mùa"

Hoa thơm bướm lượn

Concerto for piano and orchestra

=== Epic ===
Hà Nội - Huế - Sài Gòn

Bài thơ gửi Thái Nguyên (text Lê Nguyên)

Việt Nam muôn năm

Tôi là người thợ lò
