= Songs and poetry of Soviet servicemen deployed to Vietnam =

Songs and poetry of Soviet servicemen deployed to Vietnam is a number of music and lyrics, created by Soviet military men deployed to Vietnam in the 1960s, during the escalation of the Vietnam War. Mostly of no authorship, appeared to be informal or rather of a dubious kind of creativity, but not an unambiguous one. Consists of memorial songs, love songs, nostalgia songs, buddy songs, pro-war and anti-war songs, sometimes with an absolutely polar attitude towards the United States and Vietnamese allies.

== Brief overview ==
Though only one Soviet military unit, 260th Anti-Aircraft Defence Regiment, had been deployed entirely, a variety of other military units were deployed in parts, and a huge number of Soviet military specialists, mostly military advisors, were deployed there on individual missions or as members of a joined task force. Over 6000 Soviet troops and an unknown number of Civil service specialists, had been deployed during the Vietnam War.

== Songs and poetry ==
Along with official music, such as the 1965 hit "Kentucky Kid" or the 1968 "Hands Off Vietnam!", or Vietnamese songs, such as "Liberate the South", which Soviet military men used to sing along with their Vietnamese colleagues, there has been a vast number of songs and amounts of poetry in Russian, written by unauthorized poets, military men they appear to be. (Note: Only authorized creativity was accepted in the former USSR. I.e., songwriters and composers were obliged to be members of the Union of Soviet Writers or the Union of Soviet Composers respectively. Otherwise, their activities would be considered as sponging (felony) up to the war propaganda (crime).) These are:

=== Wandering The Swamps Of Vietnam ===
"Love Ballad", written by an unknown Soviet military advisor in the late 1960s. Partly appeared in journals and books, issued by the official Soviet print since 1969. In official publications, it has been presented as a song of Soviet geologists, but as it was revealed later, Soviet Civil service specialists in Vietnam, including geologists, were quite often deployed along with their wives, while the protagonist of the song yearns for a beloved woman, who is far away from the swamps of Vietnam. Besides that, swampy terrains are more typical for southern parts of the country, geological activities there would most likely be of no result. Being written by some infantryman, that is, one who participated in ground missions, the song provides evidence that Soviet servicemen were involved not only in Air Defense, Logistics and Military Transportation, as has been thought previously. However, the song contains no hatred towards Americans, nor a single mention of any foreign military power invading Vietnam.

=== Wartime Friendship ===
Semi-official unit march of 260th Anti-Aircraft Defence Regiment, written by Soviet Officer Alexander V. Gusev, after Soviet Anti-Aircraft Defense specialists' two-month ground-to-air stand versus United States Air Force, occurred at Thái Nguyên and its neighborhoods, during April–May 1966. The text of the song consists mostly of survivor experience. The song itself is a remake of the 1963 Soviet movie soundtrack On the Unknown Hillock.

=== The Road of Life ===
A short war poem written by unknown military transportation officer, could be described as clearly denoted pro-war poetry. Lyrics are mostly about the Ho Chi Minh trail, heavily bombed by Americans. But the depiction of Americans in the lyrics has been made in such epithets as "Yankees", "Satan's black spawn", "The vulture", framing the poem as anti-American as well. The poem inspired later works of well-known Soviet poets Yevgeniy Dolmatovsky (1967) and Yevgeny Yevtushenko (1972) to write lyrics, labeled with a similar name, but written in a more peaceful style and containing no anti-American attitude.

=== Phantom ===
A rehash of the 1950s Korean War guitar song. Perhaps, the best-known Soviet song, which has never been written down during the Soviet Era. Told from the imaginary point of view of an average American military aviator, the tone of the song is totally unfriendly to Vietnamese allies of the Soviet Union. Being initially created by Soviet military pilots in Korea, it induced controversial speculation about Soviet engagement in Vietnam War aerial dogfights. However, this point has not been confirmed yet, only the number of Soviet aerial casualties has been revealed recently.

=== In The Name Of John ===
A lament, supposed to have been composed by Soviet anti-aircraft defense specialists in the late 1960s or early 1970s. Metre of the song and the song itself is performed in the manner of Comin' in on a Wing and a Prayer, a famous World War II song by Harold Adamson and Jimmy McHugh. As well as Phantom, it is being told from an imaginary point of view of an average United States Air Force bomber crewman, whose aircraft was hit by Anti-aircraft cannons during a bombing mission, and streamingly going down. The presence of the Soviet military has not been mentioned in any variation of the song. Vietnamese resistance is mentioned simply as "guerrillas, who are shooting down every man". However, higher ranks of United States Armed Forces, Government officials and even the President of the United States (in some text variations) being strongly criticized, is what makes this song an anti-government one.

=== Fierce Fight ===
A song written by an unknown author, presumably a Yamal Peninsula inhabitant (Russian Far North). The author mentions Ob River, and some other distinguishing features of the Russian North, the places he belongs to. Then he explains his understanding, that there exists another world, without permanent alarm, rockets, and bombers, the world of truth, happiness, and sunlight. But he is needed to keep to his commitment. He feels the urge to help those, who are oppressed. He knows, that if he will stand and fight, with no retreat, no break, he will eventually bring happiness to those whom he defends.

=== I Want The Snow To Fall ===
A nostalgic song about the Russian soul, melting in tropical Vietnam, desiring to see the snow. The author moons about cornflower-blue skies, frosty air to breathe in deeply, ice-flowers on winter window glass, snow to fall on the chest, birch trees, boundless snowfields, crane flying wedges, summarizing it all with the question: "Oh, dear Homeland! How should the northerner do life in Vietnam?"

=== No Sleep For Me In Hanoi ===
A short three-verse song. The author finds himself standing at night, gazing at stars shining bright far away, Red River flowing, trees swaying by the wind. No sleep for him in the Capital of Vietnam. Anxiety and nostalgia over his thoughts. And far away from here, his boundless homeland covered up with snow, shining in the glare of the old Kremlin.

=== For Many "War" Is Just A Word ===
A song by an unknown author, discovered by Stanislav Batayev. The author points out that for many people, "war" is nothing more than just a word, and word of the times, which passed a long time ago. It is a reference to the Great Patriotic War, Soviet people usually meanwhile are saying "The War". For those Soviet guys, who have seen burned earth, ruined cities, and villages of Vietnam, it seems absolutely clear what is "war".

=== Farewell To Vietnam ===
Another song discovered by Stanislav Batayev. Tour of duty is now ending for the author of the song and his fellows, the suitcase is packed, the imaginary war-plan seems to have been accomplished. Good luck to those who will continue their endeavor. Friends and relatives waiting for them up there at home, and they have the honor to report to them, that "the vultures" were met with a fierce rebuff, both in the skies and on the ground. Deployment terms are not the same for all, some arrive and some are leaving. Now, they have experienced what it feels like, to be given a send-off. They swear to prevent themselves from empty promises, but to obey one rule if they will ever meet each other, they will stand up for the third toast and honor those who did not come back, those who partly came back, and those who spent their unforgettable youth down there.

=== Một Trăm Gam ===
Let's một trăm gam is an inaccurate Vietnamese translation of the most common Russian toast, "Let's drop 100 grammas". The song had been written in 2000 by retired Soviet military expert, Sr. Lieut. Alexander Anosov, who himself had been to Vietnam in 1967–1968. The song is an overview of great events which unfolded in Vietnam over thirty years ago, written by a living eyewitness of those events. The song tells about "hit & carry" task groups, whose purpose was to hit hostile aircraft and then carry up catapulted pilots, fallen hardware, and weaponry, about Soviet surprise bombings by the usage of unexploded U. S. bombs and shells, and about daily war-life. The song summarizes that it has been a long time ago, and not all survivors came to join their war-brotherhood anniversary, and the author's closing words are:

We'll honour them, by staying silently upright,
And then, for all what took place down there,
For our young years in Hanoi,
Let's "một trăm gam"!
Let's "một trăm gam"!

Мы их помянем, молча стоя,
Потом, за всё, что было там,
За нашу молодость в Ханое
По «мот чам гам»!
По «мот чам гам»!

== Sources ==
- Zolotaryov, Vladimir (2000). "Стихи и песни неизвестных авторов — участников вьетнамской войны" [Poetry and songs by unknown authors, who participated in Vietnam War]. Россия (СССР) в войнах второй половины XX века [Russia (USSR) in 20th Century wars]. Russian military historical library (in Russian). Moscow: Kulikovo Pole. p. 571. ISBN 978-5-86090-065-3. OCLC 231861428..
