= Shrubs (American band) =

American rock and roll band

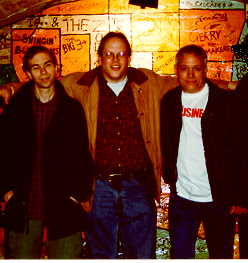
Shrubs at Cavern Club, Liverpool 2001

Shrubs are an American rock ‘n roll band based in Rock Tavern, New York.

== History ==
Shrubs was formed in 1994. The band members are Bob Torsello (bass), Rob Takleszyn (drums), and Jay LoRubbio (guitar). They perform music, a mix of garage/psych/punk/folk/pop, that has been described as “garage pop fused with alien poetics.” They have released five full-length recordings and have toured extensively throughout the northeast. Their songs have been played on many college radio stations.

Their first two releases, Pickled Children (1995) and Somebody’s Watching (1996) were issued by NOT Records on cassette tape only. A track from the former, Space Thrust, was featured on the first New Brunswick Underground compilation.

In early October 1995, Shrubs performed at the Tinker Street Café in Woodstock, New York (The Dave Matthews Band also performed on the same day [18 hours earlier, thus technically the opening band]). The show was broadcast live on WDST. A live cassette, Deluge On Tinker Street, documenting the event was issued later that year.

Shrubs released their first CD-format recording, Zod, King of Spoons, in 1997. It featured artist Erik Wrobel on space guitar.

In 2001, the group completed their first UK tour which included shows at the Hope and Anchor, Islington in London and at The Cavern Club in Liverpool. A CD that documents those shows, “Bangers & Mash – Live in the UK” was released in May 2001. It was debuted at a Patti Smith concert in New Haven, CT.

In June 2007, Shrubs were invited to perform at the memorial concert for folk legend John Herald at the Colony Cafe in Woodstock which also featured Levon Helm, Amy Helm and Larry Campbell.

Shrubs were invited by The Feelies to open their reunion shows in 2008 and 2009 at The Bowery Ballroom (NYC), Music Hall of Williamsburg (Brooklyn), and 9:30 Club (Washington DC). They have also appeared with Wake Ooloo, Pete Seeger and Gandalf Murphy and the Slambovian Circus of Dreams.

The group appeared live on WFMU’s Three Chord Monte program in November 2008. A cover version of Bevis Frond’s Through The Hedge was recorded that day and appears on a 2010 tribute CD entitled "Are You Sitting Comfortably?".

In 2009, Shrubs recorded a new CD Forgotten How To Fall at Glenn Mercer's studio. Mercer co-produced, recorded, mixed and sequenced the record. He also contributed guitar, percussion and keyboards. Erik Wrobel has once again contributed the cover art. On October 24, 2009, the band celebrated its release at the Tuscan Cafe in Warwick NY with special guests Glenn Mercer and Dave Weckerman of The Feelies.

Joe Wawrzyniak, reviewing the CD for Jersey Beat, said this: "Representing pop-rock at its most infectiously bubbly, catchy, and upbeat, this album makes a sweet and strong impression just like a bright sparkling beam of sunshine piercing through some storm clouds in an otherwise gloomy sky."

Writing for the Chrongram, Jeremy Schwartz says of Forgotten How To Fall: "The 15 tracks cover a diversity of sound within the garage/psych-pop idiom. Part of the charm of the record is its unpretentious, everyman-rocking-out vibe, which, come to think of it, is one of the subtle pleasures of the original mid ’60s wave of amateurish garage punk."

In 2018, Jay LoRubbio, founding member and guitarist, passed. The band ceased performances and recording.

In early 2026, encouraged by Glenn Mercer, surviving member Torsello and Takleszyn along with Mercer recorded two Shrubs songs that were started but never finished when the band stopped. "Let's Go" is a Torsello composition and "Lou's Place" is a LoRubbio song written in tribute to Lou Reed. The newly recorded songs were completed in tribute to LoRubbio. The competed songs were sent to DJ Joe Belock of WFMU who had been a long-time supporter of the band. He played "Let's Go" and Tony B from FABCOM! Records heard the radio show. He offered to release the two new songs and 21 others recorded on Belock's Three Chord Monte program in 2008 and 2011. On June 19, 2026, "Rising" was released.

== Side projects ==
- Janet Hamill and Moving Star - A spoken-word group that featured Torsello and LoRubbio. Greg Feller and Evan Teatum are also members. The group has performed and recorded with Patti Smith, Lenny Kaye, and David Amram.
- Glenn Mercer - Torsello played bass in Glenn’s solo band.
- Mighty Girl – Torsello played bass in this Orange County NY band.
- Armedelite Rifles – Lorubbio played bass and organ with this group.
- Electric Heater Project - Takleszyn performed with the Electric Heater Project in and around central New Jersey.

== Discography ==
=== Studio albums ===
- Pickled Children (NOT Cassette 1995)
- Somebody’s Watching (NOT Cassette 1996)
- Zod, King of Spoons (NOT CD 1997)
- Misfits & Dreamers (NOT CD 2001)
- Forgotten How To Fall (NOT CD 2009)
- Rising (FABCOM! CD 2026)

=== Live albums ===
- Deluge on Tinker Street (NOT Cassette 1995)
- Bangers and Mash (NOT CD 2001)
