= Vietnam War Song Project =

Music and cultural archive

Vietnam War Song Project (VWSP)
- Mission statement: "This project is an interpretive examination of over 6,000 Vietnam War songs identified, revealing how the war's significance is represented through music"
- Type of project: Free, open history, online, and physical archive
- Location: Austin, Texas, U.S.
- Founder: Justin Brummer
- Established: 2007, Washington D.C., U.S.
- Website: vietnamwarsongproject.com

The Vietnam War Song Project (VWSP) is an archive and interpretive examination of over 6000 Vietnam War songs identified. It was founded in 2007 by its current editor, Justin A. Brummer, a historian with a PhD in contemporary Anglo-American relations from University College London. The project analyses the lyrics, and collects data on the genre, location, ethnicity, nationality, language, and time period of the recordings. It also involves the preservation of the original physical vinyl records. Additional items collected include cassette tapes, CDs, MP3s, record label scans, and sheet music.

Since September 2026 the project has been hosted on its own website, vietnamwarsongproject.com, which presents the discography with record scans, lyrics and curated collections. It was previously hosted on the online collaborative database Rate Your Music, and also has components on YouTube and at the University of Maryland..

Part of the project includes a discography, Vietnam War Songs: An incomplete discography, which has over 6000 titles, both unique songs and cover songs, a collaboration between Hugo Keesing, Wouter Keesing, C.L. Yarbrough, and Justin Brummer at the University of Maryland Libraries. Hugo Keesing, adjunct professor of American Studies at the University of Maryland, and the producer of the 13 CD box-set compilation Next Stop Is Vietnam is also a major contributor of songs and record scans.

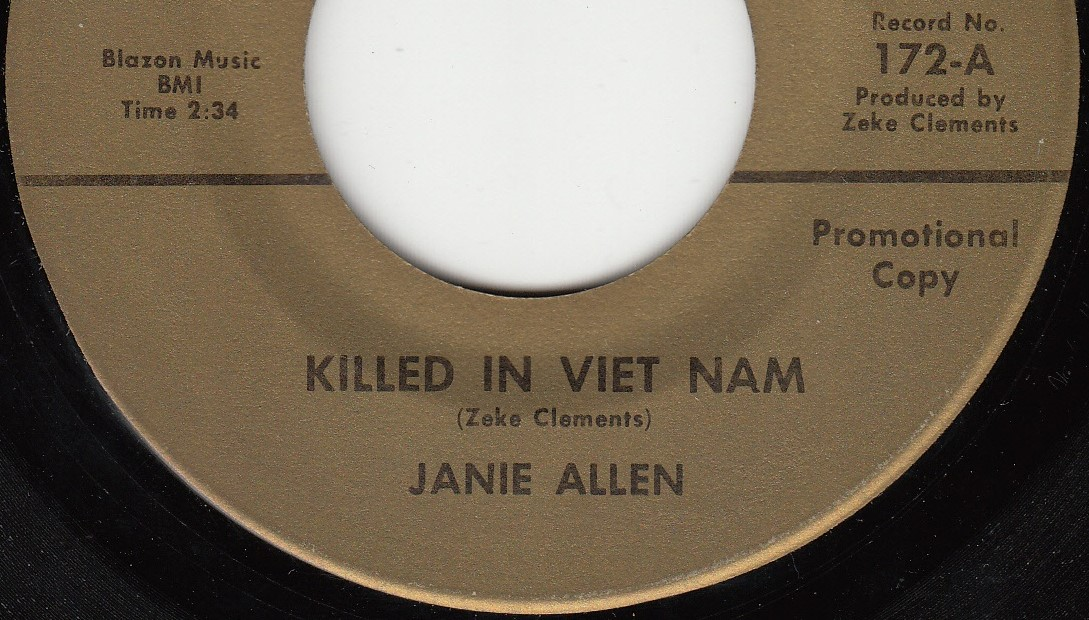

== Themes ==
The project has categorised songs into a variety of themes, from anti-war / protest / peace songs, to patriotic / pro-government / anti-protest songs during the war years, as well an analysis of songs released in the post-war period. Other themes include regional songs, such as Puerto Ricans in the Vietnam War, Australia in the Vietnam War, New Zealand in the Vietnam War, Mexican-Americans, and songs from South America, Central America, and the Caribbean. Genres include soul, gospel & funk, the blues, garage rock, punk rock, metal, hip hop, and song poem. The project also looks at songs about key events and issues, which include the Chicago Seven, Kent State shootings, the My Lai Massacre, and the Vietnam War POW/MIA issue. Other topics include songs about the Vietnam Veterans Memorial, Christmas music referencing the Vietnam War, and Vietnam War songs referencing the Civil rights movement in the US (1950s-1960s), the Silent majority, and the Domino theory.

== Reception ==
The project is a respected academic resource and a significant source of reference in popular culture. Erin R. McCoy, Associate Professor of English at the University of South Carolina Beaufort, notes in her book A War Tour of Viet Nam: A Cultural History, that "Brummer...is tirelessly cataloging every obscure piece of music from the Viet Nam era or about the Viet Nam War. His work is amazing and a...deeper dive into music". Furthermore, McCoy remarks "Dr. Brummer...combs record stores around the world looking for obscure and unique songs written about the war, and the collection he's continually building is some serious and important work".

James Barber's interview in military.com with "Justin Brummer, the one-man operation who put together the project...the greatest scholar of songs about the Vietnam War" notes "The Vietnam War Song Project is an epic undertaking". Moreover, Barber wrote "it's an invaluable resource for anyone who cares about the history of the war". In Barber's TechHive article, he noted that "the amazing Vietnam War Song Project channel on YouTube... aims to collect all songs written about the war. Many of these were one-off, private-pressing 45s, and Justin Brummer is painstakingly archiving them on YouTube". The University of Maryland's Modern Songs of War and Conflict archive comments "The Vietnam War Song Project, helmed by Justin Brummer" is "an ever-expanding project seeking to assemble a comprehensive discography of the war".

The Tennessee Council for the Social Studies has praised the work of the VWSP, noting the "Vietnam War Songs Project continues to find incredible Primary Sources for teachers to use in their Vietnam War teaching", and that the project "adds a different primary source emphasis to dealing with the Vietnam War". Rachel Lee Rubin, Professor of American Studies at the University of Massachusetts Boston, notes in her book Merle Haggard’s Okie from Muskogee, "I...want to call attention—to the magnificent Vietnam on Record discography, compiled by Hugo Keesing, Wouter Keesing, C. L. Yarbrough, and Justin Brummer". Writer Cori Brosnahan, in her PBS American Experience article on the songs of the My Lai massacre observes "researcher Justin Brummer started studying songs of the Vietnam War while preparing his PhD...and today he has catalogued some 5,000 songs".

Jason Mellard, Director of the Center for Texas Music History at Texas State University, noted that "Justin Brummer...and his Vietnam War Song Project...attempt to document every song recorded about the Vietnam War. The public face of the project is a YouTube channel where you can listen to many rare 45s unavailable on any streaming service". Franklin Fantini, founder of the Dollar Country archive, wrote "The VWSP is amazing to behold, containing thousands of discs that are organized, researched, and written about. It’s obviously controlled by a passionate and loving archivist, and that archivist is Dr. Justin Brummer". Alexander Plaum noted in his Deutsche Welle article on Vietnam protest music that: "Justin Brummer... is an expert in the rich heritage of protest music from the era. The Texas-based researcher is the founding editor and digital archivist of the Vietnam War Song Project (VWSP), a digital archive that also analyzes and interprets songs referencing the Vietnam War. Since its inception in 2007, the VWSP has collected over 6,000 Vietnam War-related songs".

The Vietnam War Song Project has received high profile media coverage. It featured in the BBC World Service documentary "The Vietnam War soundtrack", presented by Beatriz De La Pava on 3 January 2024, interviewing the editor Justin Brummer. Wisconsin Public Radio, an affiliate of National Public Radio interviewed Justin Brummer extensively, using the research of the VWSP for Robin Washington's program "Hear The Drumming: The music of the Kent State and Jackson State tragedies", broadcast on 1 May 2020. PBS centered its article ""Music of My Lai" around the collection and research of the VWSP, interviewing its editor Justin Brummer, in connection to the release of the Ken Burns' documentary The Vietnam War (TV series), in March 2018. Deutsche Welle also profiled the project and its editor in an article looking at the role of American protest culture. In music magazine Shindig! (magazine), Seán Casey discussed the project, noting that "Widespread dissensus is enfleshed in the many thematic groups compiled by Justin Brummer, founder of the Vietnam War Song Project, a digital archive of more than 6,000 recording spanning protest and/or peace, anti-protest/patriotic, pro and anti draft songs, battleground pick-me ups, laments of love and longing, and combinations of the above".

== See also ==
- List of anti-war songs
- List of songs about the Vietnam War
