= List of the Association members =

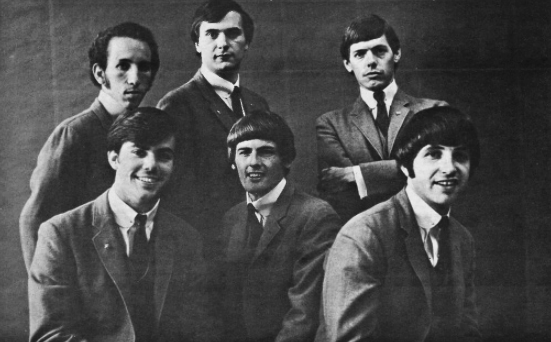
The Association in 1966. Top: from left to right; Jules Alexander, Brian Cole, Russ Giguere. Bottom; from left to right: Ted Bluchel Jr., Jim Yester, Terry Kirkman.

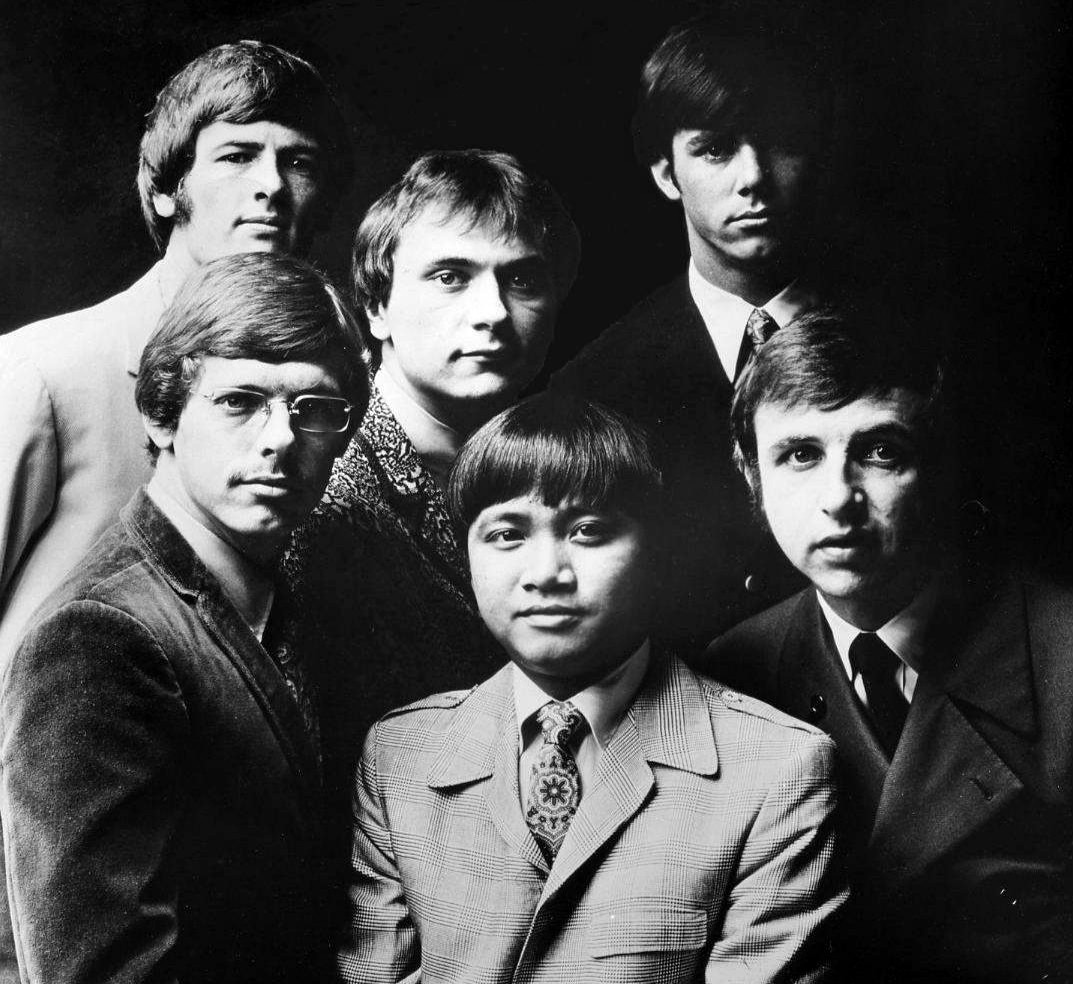
The Association in 1967. Top: from left to right; Jim Yester, Brian Cole, Ted Bluchel Jr. Bottom: from left to right; Russ Giguere, Larry Ramos, Terry Kirkman.

The Association are an American pop band, formed in Los Angeles, California, in 1965. When their breakthrough came in 1966, their line-up consisted of Terry Kirkman, Russ Giguere, Jules Alexander, Jim Yester, Brian Cole and Ted Bluechel Jr. Following Alexander's departure in 1967, Larry Ramos came in and filled his place.

== History ==
In 1962, Jules Alexander was in Hawaii, serving in the navy. Whilst there, he met traveling salesman Terry Kirkman. The two became close friends and remained in contact. When Jules was discharged from the navy a year later, the two moved to Los Angeles and played in clubs all in different parts of the city. The two became members of a thirteen-piece folk group called The Men. In 1965, the Men split up and six of their members, Alexander, Kirkman, Russ Giguere, Bob Page, Brian Cole and Ted Bluechel Jr., formed their own group. The band decided to spend six months practicing before performing on stage, during that time, Page left and Jim Yester replaced him. In late 1965, they signed to Jubilee Records. Jubilee label issued a single of "Babe I'm Gonna Leave You" (a song originally recorded by Joan Baez, later popularized by Led Zeppelin), but nothing happened. Finally, Valiant Records offered them a contract, with the first result being a version of Bob Dylan's "One Too Many Mornings", which was produced by Valiant's owner, Barry De Vorzon, at Gold Star Studios.

In July of 1966, their debut album, And Then... Along Comes the Association, was released. The track Along Comes Mary was an instant hit, charting at number 7 on the Billboard Hot 100 and their song Cherish would hit number one on the Hot 100 and remained there for three weeks straight, before being replaced by The Four Tops' Reach Out I'll Be There. In November 1966, their second album, Renaissance was released, although none of their songs managed to meet the success that Along Comes Mary and Cherish did. In March 1967, Alexander left to move to India, and Larry Ramos (previously of New Christy Minstrels fame) came in and filled his place. Insight Out, their third album, was released on June 8, 1967 and first on Warner Bros. Records after Warner Bros. bought out Valiant. Two tracks from that album include "Windy" and "Never My Love". Windy went to number one on four different American and Canadian charts. Never My Love charted at number two on the Billboard Hot 100, but was a chart-topper on the Cash Box 100 and Canadian RPM Top Singles.

Four more albums were released from 1968 to 1972, Birthday (1968), The Association (1969), Stop Your Motor (1971), and Waterbeds in Trinidad! (1972). Alexander returned to the group in 1969, while Russ Giguere left in 1970 to pursue a solo career. He was replaced by Richard Thompson. A few months after the release of Waterbeds in Trinidad, bassist Brian Cole died aged 29 from a heroin overdose. The band saw a rotating list of personnel until the band split in 1978. The split was proven to be short, and they regrouped again the following year. The band has been performing non-stop since. The current version of the band is led by Jules Alexander and Jim Yester, as well as Del Ramos, brother of Larry Ramos, and Jordan Cole, son of Brian Cole. During the 1970s and 80s, the band went through numerous line-up changes, with, at one point, only one original member in the band. Past notable members include Jerry Yester, Andy Chapin, and Ray Pohlman.

== Members ==
=== Current ===
| Image | Name | Years active | Instruments | Release contributions |
|---|---|---|---|---|
| | Jules Alexander | 1965–1967, 1969–1973, 1979–1989, 2012–present | vocals; guitar; keyboards; bass | And Then... Along Comes the Association (1966); Renaissance (1966); The Association (1969); Stop Your Motor (1971); Waterbeds in Trinidad! (1972) |
| | Jim Yester | 1965–1973, 1973–1977, 1979–1983, 2007–present | vocals; guitar; keyboards | All releases |
| | Joe Lamanno | 1984, 2025-present | vocals; bass | |
| | Bruce Pictor | 1985–present | drums; percussion; vocals | None |
| | Paul Holland | 1987–1999, 2014–present | vocals; guitar; keyboards; bass | None |
| | Gary Swan | 2025-present | vocals; guitar; keyboards | None |

=== Former ===
| Image | Name | Years active | Instruments | Release contributions |
|---|---|---|---|---|
| | Terry Kirkman | 1965–1972, 1979–1984 (died 2023) | vocals; recorder; percussion; flugelhorn; keyboards; piano; harmonica; saxophone; clarinet; flute | All releases |
| | Russ Giguere | 1965–1970, 1979–2014 | vocals; percussion; guitar | And Then... Along Comes The Association (1966); Renaissance (1966); Insight Out (1967); Birthday (1968); The Association (1969) |
| | Brian Cole | 1965–1972 (died 1972) | vocals; bass; woodwinds | All releases |
| | Ted Bluechel Jr. | 1965–1978, 1979–1984 | vocals; drums; guitar; bass | All releases |
| | Bob Page | 1965 (died 2022) | vocals; guitar; banjo | None |
| | Larry Ramos | 1967–1975, 1979–2014 (died 2014) | vocals; guitar | All releases from Insight Out (1967) |
| | Richard Thompson | 1970–1974, 1979 | keyboards | Stop Your Motor (1971); Waterbeds in Trinidad! (1972) |
| | Wolfgang Melz | 1972 | bass | None |
| | Mike Berkowitz | 1972 | drums | None |
| | David Vaught | 1972–1978 (died 2013 & 2005) | vocals; bass | None |
| | Maurice Miller | 1972–1978 (died 2013 & 2005) | vocals; drums | None |
| | Jerry Yester | 1973–1974, 1978 | vocals; guitar | None |
| | Art Johnson | 1975 (died 2018 & 2020) | vocals; guitar | None |
| | Dwayne Smith | 1975 (died 2018 & 2020) | vocals; keyboards | None |
| | Larry Brown | 1975–1977 | vocals; guitar | None |
| | Andy Chapin | 1975–1976 (died 1985) | vocals; keyboards | None |
| | Jay Gruska | 1976 | vocals; keyboards | None |
| | David Morgan | 1976–1978 | vocals; keyboards | None |
| | Ric Ulsky | 1977–1978, 1980–1984 | vocals; keyboards | None |
| | Cliff Wooley | 1977–1978 | vocals; guitar | None |
| | John William Tuttle | 1978 (Tuttle died 1991) | vocals; guitar | None |
| | Jack Harris | 1978 (Tuttle died 1991) | vocals; guitar | None |
| | Ray Pohlman | 1979 (died 1990) | | None |
| | Keith Moret | 1983 | | None |
| | Brian Puckett | 1984–1985 | drums | None |
| | Mike Peed | 1984 | keyboards | None |
| | Donni Gougeon | 1984–1987, 1999 | keyboards | None |
| | Paul Beach | 1985–1989 | bass | None |
| | Chris Urmston | 1987 | vocals; keyboards | None |
| | Del Ramos | 1999–2025 | bass | None |
| | Jordan Cole | 1999–2025 | vocals; guitar; keyboards | None |
| | Bob Werner | 1999–2007 | guitar | None |
| | David Jackson | 2007 | guitar | None |
| | Blair Anderson | 2008 | drums | None |
| | Godfrey Townsend | 2012 | guitar | None |

== Lineups ==
| Period | Members |
|---|---|
| 1965 | Terry Kirkman – vocals, wind instruments, percussion; Russ Giguere – vocals, rhythm guitar, percussion; Jules Alexander – lead guitar, vocals; Bob Page – rhythm guitar, vocals, banjo; Brian Cole – bass, vocals, woodwinds; Ted Bluechel, Jr. – drums, vocals, rhythm guitar, bass |
| 1965 – March 1967 | Terry Kirkman – vocals, wind instruments, percussion; Russ Giguere – vocals, rhythm guitar, percussion; Jules Alexander – lead guitar, vocals; Jim Yester – rhythm guitar, vocals, keyboards; Brian Cole – bass, vocals, woodwinds; Ted Bluechel, Jr. – drums, vocals, rhythm guitar, bass |
| March 1967 – Late 1968 | Terry Kirkman – vocals, wind instruments, percussion; Russ Giguere – vocals, rhythm guitar, percussion; Larry Ramos – lead guitar, vocals; Jim Yester – rhythm guitar, vocals, keyboards; Brian Cole – bass, vocals, woodwinds; Ted Bluechel, Jr. – drums, vocals, rhythm guitar, bass |
| Late 1968 – June 1970 | Terry Kirkman – vocals, wind instruments, percussion; Russ Giguere – vocals, rhythm guitar, percussion; Larry Ramos – lead guitar, vocals; Jules Alexander – lead guitar, vocals; Jim Yester – rhythm guitar, vocals, keyboards; Brian Cole – bass, vocals, woodwinds; Ted Bluechel, Jr. – drums, vocals, rhythm guitar, bass |
| June 1970 – August 1972 | Terry Kirkman – vocals, wind instruments, percussion; Larry Ramos – lead guitar, vocals; Jules Alexander – lead guitar, vocals; Jim Yester – rhythm guitar, vocals, keyboards; Richard Thompson – keyboards; Brian Cole – bass, vocals, woodwinds; Wolfgang Melz - bass (joined in 1972); Ted Bluechel, Jr. – drums, vocals, rhythm guitar, bass |
| August–December 1972 | Terry Kirkman – vocals, wind instruments, percussion; Ted Bluechel, Jr. – vocals, rhythm guitar, bass, drums; Larry Ramos – lead guitar, vocals; Jules Alexander – lead guitar, vocals; Jim Yester – rhythm guitar, vocals, keyboards; Richard Thompson – keyboards; Wolfgang Melz – bass; Mike Berkowitz – drums |
| December 1972 – mid-1973 | Ted Bluechel, Jr. – vocals, rhythm guitar, bass, drums; Larry Ramos – lead guitar, vocals; Jules Alexander – lead guitar, vocals; Jim Yester – rhythm guitar, vocals, keyboards; Richard Thompson – keyboards; David Vaught – bass, vocals; Maurice Miller – drums, vocals, percussion |
| mid–late 1973 | Ted Bluechel, Jr. – vocals, rhythm guitar, bass, drums; Larry Ramos – lead guitar, vocals; Jules Alexander – lead guitar, vocals; Jerry Yester – rhythm guitar, vocals; Richard Thompson – keyboards; David Vaught – bass, vocals; Maurice Miller – drums, vocals, percussion |
| late 1973 – late 1974 | Ted Bluechel, Jr. – vocals, rhythm guitar, bass, drums; Larry Ramos – lead guitar, vocals; Jerry Yester – lead guitar, vocals; Jim Yester – rhythm guitar, vocals; Richard Thompson – keyboards; David Vaught – bass, vocals; Maurice Miller – drums, vocals, percussion |
| late 1974 – mid-1975 | Ted Bluechel, Jr. – vocals, rhythm guitar, bass, drums; Larry Ramos – lead guitar, vocals; Art Johnson – lead guitar, vocals; Jim Yester – rhythm guitar, vocals; Dwayne Smith – keyboards, vocals; David Vaught – bass, vocals; Maurice Miller – drums, vocals, percussion |
| mid–late 1975 | Ted Bluechel, Jr. – vocals, rhythm guitar, bass, drums; Art Johnson – lead guitar, vocals; Larry Brown – lead guitar, vocals; Jim Yester – rhythm guitar, vocals; Dwayne Smith – keyboards, vocals; David Vaught – bass, vocals; Maurice Miller – drums, vocals, percussion |
| late 1975 – mid-1976 | Ted Bluechel, Jr. – vocals, rhythm guitar, bass, drums; Larry Brown – lead guitar, vocals; Jim Yester – rhythm guitar, vocals; Andy Chapin – keyboards, vocals; David Vaught – bass, vocals; Maurice Miller – drums, vocals, percussion |
| mid-1976 | Ted Bluechel, Jr. – vocals, rhythm guitar, bass, drums; Larry Brown – lead guitar, vocals; Jim Yester – rhythm guitar, vocals; Jay Gruska – keyboards, vocals; David Vaught – bass, vocals; Maurice Miller – drums, vocals, percussion |
| mid-1976 – mid-1977 | Ted Bluechel, Jr. – vocals, rhythm guitar, bass, drums; Larry Brown – lead guitar, vocals; Jim Yester – rhythm guitar, vocals; David Morgan – keyboards, vocals; David Vaught – bass, vocals; Maurice Miller – drums, vocals, percussion |
| mid-1977 | Ted Bluechel, Jr. – vocals, rhythm guitar, bass, drums; Jim Yester – lead guitar, vocals; Ric Ulsky – keyboards, vocals; David Morgan – keyboards, vocals; David Vaught – bass, vocals; Maurice Miller – drums, vocals, percussion |
| mid-1977 – 1978 | Ted Bluechel, Jr. – vocals, rhythm guitar, bass, drums; Cliff Woolley – lead guitar, vocals; Ric Ulsky – keyboards, vocals; David Morgan – keyboards, vocals; David Vaught – bass, vocals; Maurice Miller – drums, vocals, percussion |
| 1978 | Ted Bluechel, Jr. – vocals, rhythm guitar, bass, drums; Cliff Woolley – lead guitar, vocals; John William Tuttle – rhythm guitar, vocals; Ric Ulsky – keyboards, vocals; David Vaught – bass, vocals; Russ Levine – drums, vocals |
| mid-1978 | Ted Bluechel, Jr. – vocals, rhythm guitar, bass, drums; Jack Harris – lead guitar, vocals; John William Tuttle – rhythm guitar, vocals; Ric Ulsky – keyboards, vocals; David Vaught – bass, vocals; Russ Levine – drums, vocals |
| late-1978 | Ted Bluechel, Jr. – vocals, rhythm guitar, bass, drums; Jack Harris – lead guitar, vocals; Jerry Yester - lead guitar, vocals; John William Tuttle – rhythm guitar, vocals; Ric Ulsky – keyboards, vocals; David Vaught – bass, vocals; Russ Levine – drums, vocals |
| December 1978 – September 1979 | Disbanded |
| September 1979 – 1980 | Russ Giguere – vocals, rhythm guitar, percussion; Terry Kirkman – vocals, wind instruments, percussion; Larry Ramos – lead guitar, vocals; Jules Alexander – lead guitar, vocals; Jim Yester – rhythm guitar, vocals; Richard Thompson – keyboards; Ray Pohlman – bass; Ted Bluechel, Jr. – drums, vocals, rhythm guitar, bass |
| 1980 – June 1983 | Russ Giguere – vocals, rhythm guitar, percussion; Terry Kirkman – vocals, wind instruments, percussion; Larry Ramos – lead guitar, vocals; Jim Yester – rhythm guitar, vocals; Ric Ulsky – keyboards; Jules Alexander – bass, vocals; Ted Bluechel, Jr. – drums, vocals, rhythm guitar, bass; Russ Levine - drums (left in 1980) |
| June 1983 – July 1984 | Russ Giguere – vocals, rhythm guitar, percussion; Terry Kirkman – vocals, wind instruments, percussion; Larry Ramos – lead guitar, vocals; Jules Alexander – lead guitar, vocals; Ric Ulsky – keyboards; Keith Moret – bass; Ted Bluechel, Jr. – drums, vocals, rhythm guitar, bass |
| July–September 1984 | Russ Giguere – vocals, rhythm guitar, percussion; Terry Kirkman – vocals, wind instruments, percussion; Ted Bluechel, Jr. – vocals, rhythm guitar, bass, drums; Larry Ramos – lead guitar, vocals; Jules Alexander – lead guitar, vocals; Ric Ulsky – keyboards; Joe Lamanno – bass; Brian Puckett – drums |
| September–November 1984 | Russ Giguere – vocals, rhythm guitar, percussion; Ted Bluechel, Jr. – vocals, rhythm guitar, bass, drums; Larry Ramos – lead guitar, vocals; Jules Alexander – lead guitar, vocals; Mike Peed – keyboards; Joe Lamanno – bass; Brian Puckett – drums |
| November 1984 | Russ Giguere – vocals, rhythm guitar, percussion; Ted Bluechel, Jr. – vocals, rhythm guitar, bass, drums; Larry Ramos – lead guitar, vocals; Jules Alexander – lead guitar, vocals; Donni Gougeon – keyboards; Joe Lamanno – bass; Brian Puckett – drums |
| early 1985 – early 1987 | Russ Giguere – vocals, rhythm guitar, percussion; Larry Ramos – lead guitar, vocals; Jules Alexander – lead guitar, vocals; Donni Gougeon – keyboards; Paul Beach – bass, vocals; Bruce Pictor – drums, vocals, percussion; Del Ramos – sound, vocals |
| 1987 | Russ Giguere – vocals, rhythm guitar, percussion; Larry Ramos – lead guitar, vocals; Jules Alexander – lead guitar, vocals; Chris Urmston – keyboards, vocals; Paul Beach – bass, vocals; Bruce Pictor – drums, vocals, percussion; Del Ramos – sound, vocals |
| 1987 – early 1989 | Russ Giguere – vocals, rhythm guitar, percussion; Larry Ramos – lead guitar, vocals; Jules Alexander – lead guitar, vocals; Paul Holland – keyboards, vocals; Paul Beach – bass, vocals; Bruce Pictor – drums, vocals, percussion; Del Ramos – sound, vocals |
| early 1989 – 1999 | Russ Giguere – vocals, rhythm guitar, percussion; Larry Ramos – lead guitar, vocals; Donni Gougeon – keyboards; Paul Holland – bass, vocals; Bruce Pictor – drums, vocals, percussion; Del Ramos – sound, vocals |
| 1999 | Russ Giguere – vocals, rhythm guitar, percussion; Larry Ramos – lead guitar, vocals; Bob Werner – rhythm guitar, vocals; Donni Gougeon – keyboards, vocals; Del Ramos – bass, vocals; Bruce Pictor – drums, vocals, percussion |
| 1999–2007 | Russ Giguere – vocals, rhythm guitar, percussion; Larry Ramos – lead guitar, vocals; Bob Werner – rhythm guitar, vocals; Jordan Cole – keyboards, vocals, rhythm guitar; Del Ramos – bass, vocals; Bruce Pictor – drums, vocals, percussion |
| 2007 | Russ Giguere – vocals, rhythm guitar, percussion; Larry Ramos – lead guitar, vocals; Jordan Cole – keyboards, vocals, rhythm guitar; Del Ramos – bass, vocals; David Jackson – bass, rhythm guitar; Bruce Pictor – drums, vocals, percussion |
| 2007 | Russ Giguere – vocals, rhythm guitar, percussion; Larry Ramos – lead guitar, vocals; Bob Werner – rhythm guitar, vocals; Jordan Cole – keyboards, vocals, rhythm guitar; Del Ramos – bass, vocals; Bruce Pictor – drums, vocals, percussion |
| 2007–2008 | Russ Giguere – vocals, rhythm guitar, percussion; Larry Ramos – lead guitar, vocals; Jim Yester – rhythm guitar, vocals; Jordan Cole – keyboards, vocals, rhythm guitar; Del Ramos – bass, vocals; Bruce Pictor – drums, vocals, percussion |
| 2008 | Russ Giguere – vocals, rhythm guitar, percussion; Larry Ramos – lead guitar, vocals; Jim Yester – rhythm guitar, vocals; Jordan Cole – keyboards, vocals, rhythm guitar; Del Ramos – bass, vocals; Blair Anderson – drums |
| 2008 – January 2012 | Russ Giguere – vocals, rhythm guitar, percussion; Larry Ramos – lead guitar, vocals; Jim Yester – rhythm guitar, vocals; Jordan Cole – keyboards, vocals, rhythm guitar; Del Ramos – bass, vocals; Bruce Pictor – drums, vocals, percussion |
| January–February 2012 | Russ Giguere – vocals, rhythm guitar, percussion; Godfrey Townsend – lead guitar, vocals; Jim Yester – rhythm guitar, vocals; Jordan Cole – keyboards, vocals, rhythm guitar; Del Ramos – bass, vocals; Bruce Pictor – drums, vocals, percussion |
| February–March 2012 | Russ Giguere – vocals, rhythm guitar, percussion; Jules Alexander – lead guitar, vocals; Jim Yester – rhythm guitar, vocals; Jordan Cole – keyboards, vocals, rhythm guitar; Del Ramos – bass, vocals; Bruce Pictor – drums, vocals, percussion |
| March 2012 – January 2014 | Russ Giguere – vocals, rhythm guitar, percussion; Jules Alexander – lead guitar, vocals; Larry Ramos – lead guitar, vocals; Jim Yester – rhythm guitar, vocals; Jordan Cole – keyboards, vocals, rhythm guitar; Del Ramos – bass, vocals; Bruce Pictor – drums, vocals, percussion |
| January–February 2014 | Jules Alexander – lead guitar, vocals; Larry Ramos – lead guitar, vocals; Jim Yester – rhythm guitar, vocals; Jordan Cole – keyboards, vocals, rhythm guitar; Del Ramos – bass, vocals; Bruce Pictor – drums, vocals, percussion |
| February 2014 – October 2025 | Jules Alexander – lead guitar, vocals; Paul Holland – lead guitar, vocals; Jim Yester – rhythm guitar, vocals; Jordan Cole – keyboards, vocals, rhythm guitar; Del Ramos – bass, vocals; Bruce Pictor – drums, vocals, percussion |
| October – November 2025 | Jules Alexander – lead guitar, vocals; Jim Yester – rhythm guitar, vocals; Paul Holland – lead guitar, vocals; Del Ramos – bass, vocals; Gary Swan – keyboards, vocals; Bruce Pictor – drums, vocals, percussion |
| November 2025 – present | Jules Alexander – lead guitar, vocals; Paul Holland – lead guitar, vocals; Jim Yester – rhythm guitar, vocals; Joe Lamanno – bass, vocals; Gary Swan – bass, vocals; Bruce Pictor – drums, vocals, percussion |
