= The Association "Live" =

Live album by The Association
- Released: August 1970
- Recorded: April 3, 1970
- Length: 74:30 approx.
- Label: Warner Bros.
- Producer: Ray Pohlman

The Association chronology
The Association (1969)	The Association "Live" (1970)	Stop Your Motor (1971)

The Association "Live" is the first live album by The Association. The 2-disc album set was recorded at a concert in Salt Lake City and released by Warner Bros. Records in 1970. This album peaked at number 79 on the Billboard Top LPs during a twelve-week stay on the chart.

== Track listing ==
Side one
No.	Title	Writer(s)	Lead vocals	Length
1.	"Dream Girl" (Recorded in Ted Bluechel's bathroom weeks after the concert)	Ted Bluechel Jr.	Group	1:36
2.	"One Too Many Mornings"	Bob Dylan	Giguere	2:51
3.	"Along Comes Mary"	Tandyn Almer	Yester	5:23
4.	"I'll Be Your Man"	Russ Giguere	Giguere	3:19
5.	"Goodbye, Columbus"	Jim Yester	Yester	2:29
6.	"Last Flower" (Appears on early copies of the album, omitted on later pressings)	James Thurber	Cole (spoken word)	2:15
7.	"Get Together"	Chet Powers	Group	3:21

Side two
No.	Title	Writer(s)	Lead vocals	Length
1.	"Wasn't It A Bit Like Now"	Terry Kirkman	Kirkman and Ramos	4:34
2.	"Never My Love"	Don Addrisi, Dick Addrisi	Kirkman and Ramos	3:12
3.	"Goodbye Forever"	Jules Alexander, Rita Martinson, Kirkman	Ramos	2:49
4.	"Just About the Same"	Rhodes, Stec, Fennelly, Mallory, Edgar	Group	2:50
5.	"Babe I'm Gonna Leave You"	Anne Bredon	Giguere	3:42

Side three
No.	Title	Writer(s)	Lead vocals	Length
1.	"Seven Man Band"	Kirkman	Kirkman	2:24
2.	"The Time It Is Today"	Giguere	Giguere	3:02
3.	"Dubuque Blues"	Alexander	Cole and Ramos	4:41
4.	"Blistered"	Billy Edd Wheeler	Giguere	2:58
5.	"What Were the Words"	Yester	Yester	2:28
6.	"Remember"	Alexander	Yester	3:19

Side four
No.	Title	Writer(s)	Lead vocals	Length
1.	"Are You Ready"	Larry Ramos, Tony Ortega	Ramos	2:52
2.	"Cherish"	Kirkman	Kirkman	5:14
3.	"Requiem For The Masses"	Kirkman	Kirkman	4:28
4.	"Windy"	Ruthann Friedman	Giguere and Ramos	3:40
5.	"Enter the Young"	Kirkman	Kirkman	3:08

== Personnel ==
- Jules Gary Alexander - lead guitar, vocals
- Larry Ramos - lead guitar, vocals
- Jim Yester - rhythm guitar, organ, vocals
- Russ Giguere - congas, timbales, shakers, tambourine, rhythm guitar, vocals
- Terry Kirkman - tenor and soprano recorders, trumpet, bass trumpet

, piano, organ, saxophone on "Babe I'm Gonna Leave You", harmonica on "Blistered", tambourine, vocals

- Brian Cole - bass, vocals
- Ted Bluechel Jr. - drums, cowbell, vocals

== Charts ==
Year	Chart	Position
1970	CAN RPM Top 100 Albums	28
1970	US Billboard Top LPs	79
