= Grammy Award for Best Contemporary (R&R) Performance =

Music award category

The Grammy Awards in the Best Contemporary (R&R) Performance categories were awarded in 1966, 1967 and 1968. They appeared in different guises at the Grammys, aimed at male and female soloists and duos/groups. The Recording Academy used these categories to distinguish contemporary or rock 'n' roll recordings from traditional pop recordings, which had their own Best Pop Vocal Performance categories for male and female soloists and for duos or groups.

== Winners and nominees ==
Year	Recipient	Nominee
1968	Best Contemporary Female Solo Vocal Performance	
1968	"Ode to Billie Joe" by Bobbie Gentry	"Don't Sleep in the Subway" by Petula Clark; "I Say a Little Prayer" by Dionne Warwick; "It Must Be Him" by Vikki Carr; "(You Make Me Feel Like) A Natural Woman" by Aretha Franklin
1968	Best Contemporary Male Solo Vocal Performance	
1968	"By the Time I Get to Phoenix" by Glen Campbell	"Can't Take My Eyes Off You" by Frankie Valli; "Child of Clay" by Jimmie Rodgers; "San Francisco (Be Sure to Wear Flowers in Your Hair)" by Scott McKenzie; "Yesterday" by Ray Charles
1968	Best Contemporary Group Performance (Vocal or Instrumental)	
1968	"Up, Up and Away" by The 5th Dimension	"A Whiter Shade of Pale" by Procol Harum; "I'm a Believer" by The Monkees; "Sgt. Pepper's Lonely Hearts Club Band" by The Beatles; "The Letter" by The Box Tops; "Windy" by The Association
1968	Best Contemporary Single	
1968	"Up, Up and Away" by The 5th Dimension	"By the Time I Get to Phoenix" by Glen Campbell; "Don't Sleep in the Subway" by Petula Clark; "Ode to Billie Joe" by Bobbie Gentry; "Yesterday" by Ray Charles
1968	Best Contemporary Album	
1968	Sgt. Pepper's Lonely Hearts Club Band by The Beatles (performer) and George Martin (producer)	Insight Out by The Association (performer) and (producer Bones Howe); It Must Be Him by Vikki Carr (performer) and Tommy Oliver, Dave Pell (producer); Ode to Billie Joe by Bobbie Gentry (performer) and Kelly Gordon (producer); Up, Up and Away by The 5th Dimension (performer) and Marc Gordon, Willie Hutch, Johnny Rivers, Rob Santos (producer)
1967	Best Contemporary (R&R) Solo Vocal Performance - Male or Female	
1967	"Eleanor Rigby" by Paul McCartney (performed by The Beatles)	"Born a Woman" by Sandy Posey; "If I Were a Carpenter" by Bobby Darin; "These Boots Are Made for Walkin'" by Nancy Sinatra; "You Don't Have to Say You Love Me" by Dusty Springfield
1967	Best Contemporary (R&R) Group Performance - Vocal or Instrumental	
1967	"Monday, Monday" by The Mamas & the Papas	"Cherish" by The Association; "Good Vibrations" by The Beach Boys; "Guantanamera" by The Sandpipers; "Last Train to Clarksville" by The Monkees
1967	Best Contemporary (R&R) Recording	
1967	"Winchester Cathedral" by The New Vaudeville Band	"Monday, Monday" by The Mamas & the Papas; "Eleanor Rigby" by The Beatles; "Cherish" by The Association; "Good Vibrations" by The Beach Boys; "Last Train to Clarksville" by The Monkees
1966	Best Contemporary (R&R) Vocal Performance – Female	
1966	"I Know a Place" by Petula Clark	"Baby I'm Yours" by Barbara Lewis; "Rescue Me" by Fontella Bass; "Sunshine, Lollipops and Rainbows" by Lesley Gore; "What the World Needs Now Is Love" by Jackie DeShannon
1966	Best Contemporary (R&R) Vocal Performance – Male	
1966	"King of the Road" by Roger Miller	"1-2-3" by Len Barry; "Heartaches by the Number" by Johnny Tillotson; "What's New Pussycat?" by Tom Jones; "Yesterday" by Paul McCartney
1966	Best Contemporary (R&R) Performance – Group (Vocal or Instrumental)	
1966	"Flowers on the Wall" by The Statler Brothers	"Help!" by The Beatles; "Mrs. Brown, You've Got a Lovely Daughter" by Herman's Hermits; "Stop! In the Name of Love" by The Supremes; "Wooly Bully" by Sam the Sham and the Pharaohs
1966	Best Contemporary (Rock and Roll) Single	
1966	"King of the Road" by Roger Miller	"Baby the Rain Must Fall" by Glenn Yarbrough; "It's Not Unusual" by Tom Jones; "What the World Needs Now Is Love" by Jackie DeShannon; "Yesterday" by Paul McCartney

After 1968, the contemporary/rock and roll categories and the pop vocal categories merged into the Best Contemporary/Pop Vocal Performance categories. The fact that in 1968, the three winners in the Male, Female and Group categories of the Best Contemporary Performance were identical to the winners of the Best Vocal Performance categories (Bobbie Gentry, Glen Campbell and The Fifth Dimension), had shown that the distinction between the two category groups was difficult to recognise.

The Best Contemporary Single category returned in 1970 and 1971, when it was renamed Best Contemporary Song.
