= Larry Ramos =

American pop musician (1942-2014)

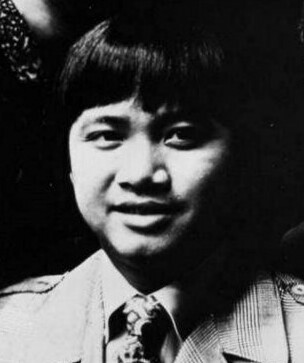
- Ramos, 1967
- Born: Hilario Ramos; April 19, 1942; Waimea, Kauai County, Hawaii, U.S.
- Died: April 30, 2014 (aged 72); Clarkston, Washington, U.S.
- Occupations: Singer, guitarist, banjo player
- Spouse: Helene (m.1964–2014)
- Children: 5

Hilario D. "Larry" Ramos Jr. (April 19, 1942 – April 30, 2014) was an American guitarist, banjo player and vocalist known primarily for his work with the 1960s pop band the Association. In 1963, he won a Grammy Award with the New Christy Minstrels, with Ramos being the first Asian American to do so.

== Early years ==
Ramos was of Filipino descent with a blend of Chinese and Spanish. He was born to father Larry Ramos Sr., who operated pool halls in Honolulu, Kakaako and Kalaheo, and mother Pat Ramos. He was raised in Waimea, Kauai County, Hawaii.

Ramos' father taught him how to play the ukulele, beginning with "My Bonnie Lies over the Ocean" at the age of four. Ramos recalled practicing on the floor of the hotel gift shop where his mother worked and sleeping with the instrument so that he could play upon wakening. He won a local music contest with his sister at the age of five, and when he was seven, Ramos played ukulele on The Arthur Godfrey Show after winning a statewide ukulele contest organized by Godfrey. He played ukulele and sang in the 1950 musical romance film Pagan Love Song, starring Esther Williams, after Arthur Freed had heard him playing the song in his mother's hotel gift shop. However, Ramos' part singing "The House of Singing Bamboo" was cut in the final edit to shorten the film's running time.

In the early 1950s, the family moved to Bell, California. At 13, Ramos performed in the national tour of the Richard Rodgers and Oscar Hammerstein II musical The King and I as understudy (to Patrick Adiarte) in the role of the crown prince of Thailand opposite Yul Brynner. He performed the lead role with Leonard Graves and Patricia Morison in 1955 (while the film was being produced) at the Royal Alexandra Theatre in Toronto. Concerned that her son's education was inadequate, Ramos' mother withdrew him from the tour after a year, and he attended Bell High School before majoring in political science at East Los Angeles College and Cerritos College.

== Career ==
=== The New Christy Minstrels ===
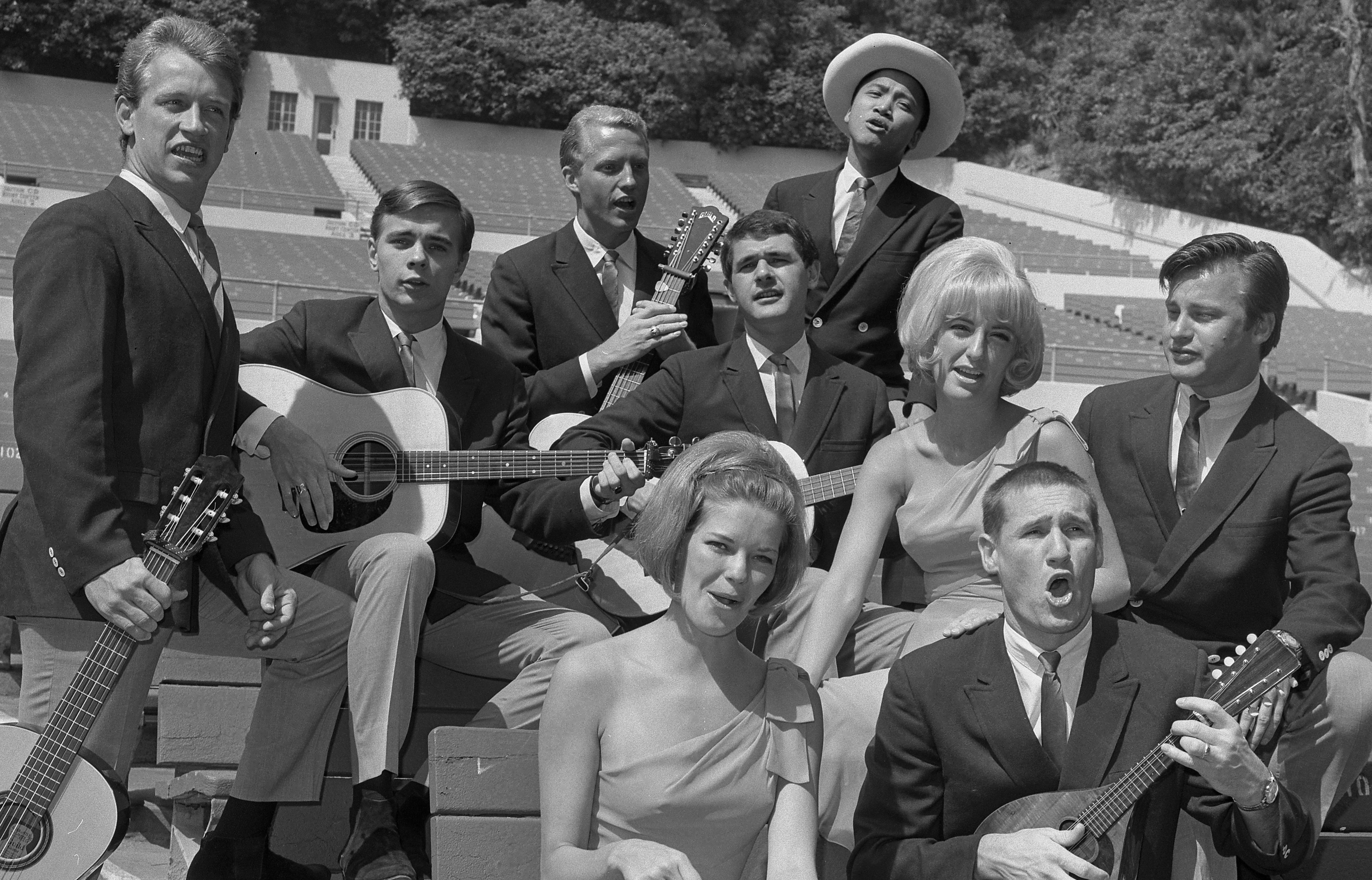
The New Christy Minstrels in 1965. (Ramos at top wearing a hat)

Ramos joined the New Christy Minstrels, an American folk music band, in 1962. The group served as a backup band on The Andy Williams Show. At the audition, he noted that he was "the only brown kid in the group" and he did not hear back from them for several weeks. When they eventually called him, they informed him that the delay was caused by the show's producers because he would be the only non-white member of the band.

Ramos settled into a role providing vocals and playing banjo as well as other stringed instruments. He was noted as being "one of the more popular ones" as he "stood out like a sore thumb."

The New Christy Minstrels recorded their 1962 debut album Presenting the New Christy Minstrels, which subsequently won a 1963 Grammy Award for Best Performance by a Chorus, making Ramos the first Asian-American to win the award.

Ramos toured almost every day for three years after joining the band. While on tour, he met and married his wife, who was originally from Grangeville, Idaho, in Reno, Nevada. After the birth of his twin daughters, he did not see his family again for six months, prompting him to quit the band in January 1966 because he "wanted to watch his children grow up." The band's managers threatened Ramos that if he left the group, he would never work in music again.

=== The Association ===
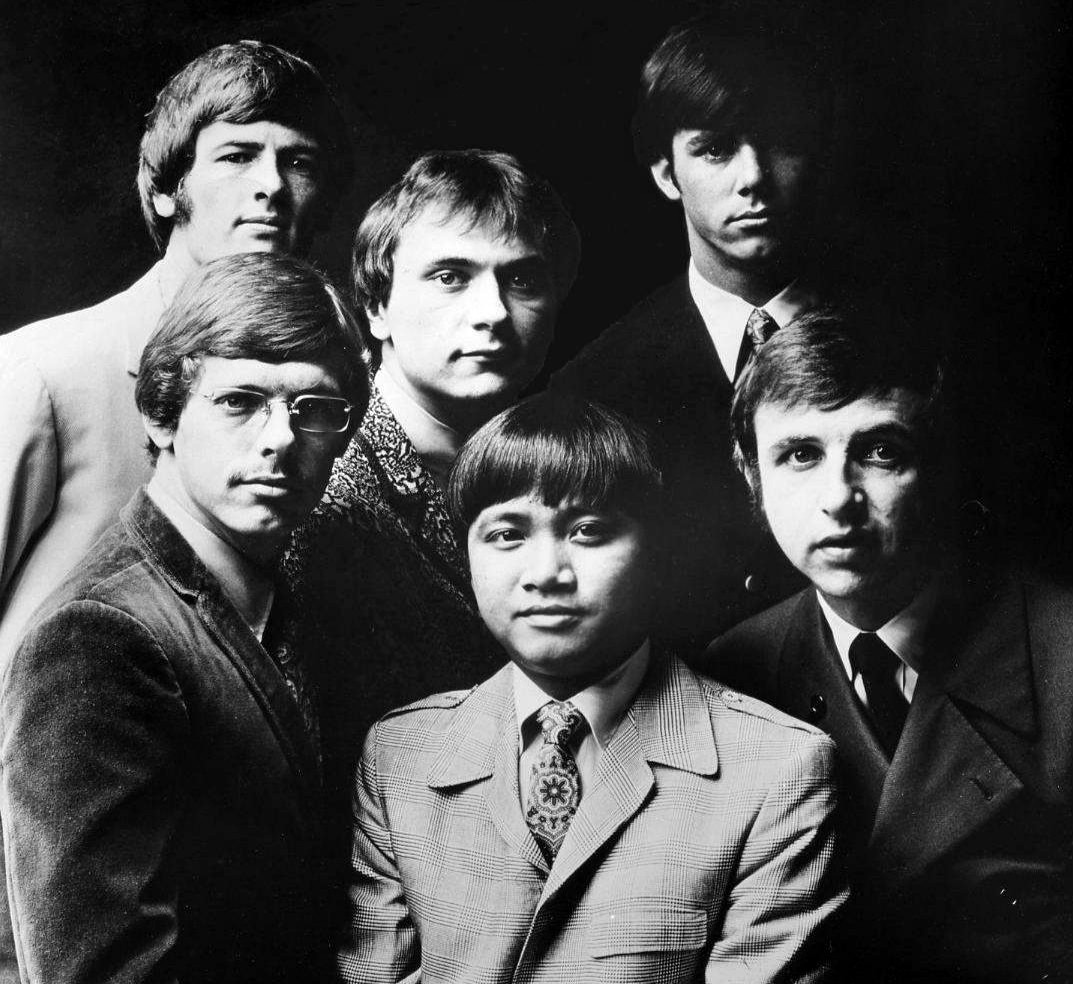
The Association in 1967. (Ramos bottom middle)

After quitting the New Christy Minstrels, Ramos worked as a studio musician and backup singer, releasing a solo single in 1966, "It'll Take a Little Time" (later collected in the 2002 album Anthology: Just The Right Sound by the Association).

In 1967, Terry Kirkman of the Association asked Ramos to join the band because their lead guitarist, Jules Alexander, was planning to leave the band for a spiritual pilgrimage to India. According to Ramos, he attended an Association concert in the San Francisco Bay Area to get a feel for their music, but after bass player Brian Cole injured his fingers in a firecracker accident, Alexander asked Ramos to take the stage as the lead guitarist with only a few hours of notice. Ramos learned the chords after listening to the band's two albums for two hours.

Later that year, Ramos performed with the band at the 1967 Monterey Pop Festival. While he was with the Association, he performed on five of their studio albums and several singles. Most notably, Ramos contributed lead vocals for the hit singles "Windy" (along with Russ Giguere) and "Never My Love" (along with Terry Kirkman) for the Association's first studio album with Ramos, the gold-selling Insight Out.

Ramos left the Association in 1975 over differences regarding the band’s future musical direction, but he reunited with the surviving members in 1979. In 1984, Ramos and Giguere acquired the rights to the band's name and Ramos was considered its leader.

On February 24, 2014, Ramos made his final performance with the band, two sold-out shows at the Blue Fox Theatre in Grangeville, Idaho, with proceeds to benefit a local Relay For Life.

After Ramos' death, his vocal parts were covered by Paul Holland.

== Illness and death ==
Ramos, a longtime resident of Grangeville, Idaho, since the 1980s, suffered numerous ailments over his last few years. On August 31, 2011, he suffered a heart attack. In 2013, he was diagnosed with metastatic melanoma. He died at a hospital in Clarkston, Washington, on April 30, 2014, at the age of 72.

== Discography ==
=== The New Christy Minstrels ===
==== Albums ====
Title	Year
Presenting the New Christy Minstrels	1962
The New Christy Minstrels In Person	1962
The New Christy Minstrels Tell Tall Tales! (Legends and Nonsense)	1963
Ramblin' Featuring Green, Green	1963
Merry Christmas!	1963
Today and Other Songs from 'Advance to the Rear'	1964
Land of Giants	1964
The New Christy Minstrels Sing and Play Cowboys and Indians	1965
Chim Chim Cher-ee	1965
The New Christy Minstrels	1965
The Quiet Sides of the New Christy Minstrels	1965
The Wandering Minstrels	1965
Amore, Ritorna...	1965

==== Singles ====
Year	Single (A-side, B-side)
1963	"Denver" b/w "Liza Lee"
1963	"Green, Green" b/w "The Banjo" (Non-album track)
1963	"Saturday Night" b/w "The Wheeler Dealers"
1964	"Today" b/w "Miss Katy Cruel" (Non-album track)
1964	"Silly Ol' Summertime" b/w "The Far Side of the Hill" (from The Quiet Sides of The New Christy Minstrels)
1964	"This Ol' Riverboat" (New recording; non-album track) b/w "Same Ol' Huckleberry Finn" (Non-album track)
1964	"Gotta Get A'Goin" b/w "Down the Road I Go"
1965	"Chim, Chim, Cheree" b/w "They Gotta Quit Kickin' My Dog Around" (from The New Christy Minstrels Sing and Play Cowboys and Indians)
1965	"The River" b/w "Se piangi, se ridi" (from In Italy...In Italian)
1965	"A Little Bit of Happiness" b/w "Jim 'N I, Him 'N I, Flying in the Gemini" (Non-album track)
1965	"Born to Be Free" b/w "Everybody Loves Saturday Night" (from The Wandering Minstrels)

=== The Association ===
==== Albums ====
Title	Year
Insight Out	1967
Birthday	1968
The Association	1969
Stop Your Motor	1971
Waterbeds in Trinidad!	1972

==== Singles ====
Year	Titles
1967	"No Fair at All" / "Looking Glass"
1967	"Windy" b/w "Sometime"
1967	"Never My Love" / "Requiem for the Masses"
1968	"Everything That Touches You" b/w "We Love Us" (from Insight Out)
1968	"Time for Livin'" b/w "Birthday Morning"
1968	"Six Man Band" b/w "Like Always" (from Birthday)
1969	"The Time It Is Today" b/w "Enter the Young" (from And Then...Along Comes the Association)
1969	"Goodbye, Columbus" b/w "The Time It Is Today" (from Birthday)
1969	"Under Branches" b/w "Hear in Here" (from Birthday)
1970	"Yes, I Will" b/w "I Am Up for Europe"
1970	"Dubuque Blues" b/w "Are You Ready"
1970	"Just About the Same" b/w "Look at Me, Look at You" (from The Association)
1970	"Along the Way" b/w "Traveler's Guide"
1971	"P.F. Sloan" b/w "Traveler's Guide"
1971	"Bring Yourself Home" b/w "It's Gotta Be Real"
1971	"That's Racin'" b/w "Makes Me Cry" (alternate title for "Funny Kind of Song")
1972	"Darlin' Be Home Soon" b/w "Indian Wells Woman"
1972	"Come the Fall" b/w "Kicking the Gong Around"
1973	"Names, Tags, Numbers and Labels" b/w "Rainbows Bent" (from Waterbeds in Trinidad!)
1975	"One Sunday Morning" b/w "Life Is a Carnival"
1975	"Sleepy Eyes" b/w "Take Me to the Pilot"
1981	"Dreamer" b/w "You Turn the Light On"
1981	"Small Town Lovers" b/w "Across the Persian Gulf"

== See also ==
- List of lead guitarists
- List of rhythm guitarists
- List of banjo players
- List of lead vocalists
- List of singer-songwriters
