= Goodbye, Columbus (soundtrack) =

Goodbye Columbus (The Album)

Soundtrack album by the Association
- Released: March 1969
- Genre: Film soundtrack
- Label: Warner Bros.
- Producer: John Boylan

The Association chronology
Greatest Hits (1968)	Goodbye Columbus (The Album) (1969)	The Association (1969)

Goodbye, Columbus is the soundtrack to the 1969 movie of the same name (No. 99). It features four songs written and performed by the Association. The rest of the album consists of incidental music by composer Charles Fox. The title track reached No. 80 on Billboard's charts in early 1969.

The lead vocal on each of the four Association songs is performed by the song's writer, with the exception of the instrumental version of "Goodbye, Columbus", which features the entire group on lead vocals.

Professional ratings
Review scores
Source	Rating
Allmusic	2/5 stars

== Track listing ==
All tracks are written by Charles Fox, except where noted.

Side one
No.	Title	Writer(s)	Length
1.	"Goodbye, Columbus"	Jim Yester	2:22
2.	"How Will I Know You?"		1:57
3.	"Dartmouth? Dartmouth!"		2:23
4.	"Goodbye, Columbus" (instrumental)	Yester	2:10
5.	"Ron's Reverie"	Cornell, Dougherty	3:34

Side two
No.	Title	Writer(s)	Length
1.	"It's Gotta Be Real"	Larry Ramos	2:16
2.	"A Moment to Share"		2:35
3.	"Love Has a Way"		2:11
4.	"A Time for Love"		1:29
5.	"So Kind to Me (Brenda's Theme)"	Terry Kirkman	4:08

== Charts ==
Chart (1969)	Peak position
US Billboard Top LPs	99
