= Birthday (Association album) =

Studio album by the Association
- Released: March 7, 1968
- Recorded: September 12, 1967 – February 23, 1968
- Studio: United Western Recorders, Hollywood, CA
- Genre: Pop
- Length: 33:17
- Label: Warner Bros.-Seven Arts
- Producer: Bones Howe

The Association chronology
Insight Out (1967)	Birthday (1968)	Greatest Hits (1968)

Professional ratings
Review scores
Source	Rating
Allmusic	4/5 stars

Birthday is the fourth studio album by the American band the Association. The album featured two hit singles, "Everything That Touches You", which hit number 10 in the charts, and "Time for Livin'", which reached number 39. This was the last LP by the group that spawned Top 40 hits. It peaked at number 23 in the Billboard charts.

== MacArthur Park ==
The song "MacArthur Park", which was first recorded by Richard Harris, was originally offered to the Association for inclusion on this album. Producer Bones Howes challenged Jimmy Webb to write a pop song that incorporated classical instrumentation and an odd time signature, which he planned to have the Association record. The song was rumored to be intended as a centerpiece for a twenty-four-minute cantata that would occupy one side of the record. This rumor was later debunked by Webb himself, who claimed there was only one composition. Nonetheless, the song was excluded because the group, being able songwriters themselves, were not willing to give up two to three of their songs for the sake of Webb's project.

Terry Kirkman on the Discogropheties podcast (recorded just prior to his death) stated that they were offered MacArthur Park only two or three days before a tour. There was no time to arrange or record it, and the album was mostly completed anyway.

When Harris, who had just performed a slew of musical numbers for the film adaptation of Camelot, contacted Webb for a possible collaboration, this was among the compositions that were in consideration. The Harris recording became lead single for his pop record debut, A Tramp Shining, and made its way onto the Billboard Hot 100 at number 79 on May 11, 1968, peaking at number 2 on June 22, 1968 behind Herb Alpert's "This Guy's in Love with You".

== Track listing ==
#	Title	Writer	Lead vocals	Recorded	Time
	Side 1				
1.	"Come on In"	Jo Mapes	Kirkman, Giguere	January 26, February 19 & 20, 1968	3:16
2.	"Rose Petals, Incense and a Kitten"	Ric McClelland, Jim Yester	Yester	February 3, 19 & 20, 1968	2:49
3.	"Like Always"	Tony Ortega, Bob Alcivar, Larry Ramos	Ramos	December 27, 1967 & February 23, 1968	3:04
4.	"Everything That Touches You"	Terry Kirkman	Kirkman, Yester	November 14, 1967, January 4 & February 9, 1968	3:17
5.	"Toymaker"	Jeff Comanor	Yester, Kirkman	February 3, 12 & 16, 1968	3:25
	Side 2				
1.	"Barefoot Gentleman"	Skip Carmel, Jim Yester	Yester	December 27, 1967, February 16 & 19, 1968	3:23
2.	"Time for Livin"	Addrisi Brothers	Giguere, Ramos	February 2, 19, 20 & 23, 1968	2:43
3.	"Hear in Here"	Ted Bluechel, Jr.	Bluechel, Jr.	February 2, 16, 19, 20 & 23, 1968	3:13
4.	"The Time It Is Today"	Russ Giguere	Giguere	December 27, 1967	2:15
5.	"The Bus Song"	Terry Kirkman	Kirkman	February 2 & 20, 1968	3:27
6.	"Birthday Morning"	Skip Carmel, Jim Yester	Yester	September 12, 1967 & January 4, 1968	2:25

=== Singles ===
1. "Everything That Touches You" b/w "We Love Us" (Warner Bros. 7163) January 8, 1968 (US #10)
2. "Time for Livin'" b/w "Birthday Morning" (Warner Bros. 7195) April 24, 1968 (US #39)

== Personnel ==
=== The Association ===
- Terry Kirkman – wind instruments, vocals, percussion
- Larry Ramos – lead guitar, vocals
- Russ Giguere – rhythm guitar, vocals, percussion
- Brian Cole – bass, vocals, woodwinds
- Ted Bluechel, Jr. – drums, vocals, rhythm guitar, bass
- Jim Yester – rhythm guitar, vocals, keyboards

=== Additional musicians ===
According to the 2010 deluxe mono edition:

- Hal Blaine – drums
- Joe Osborn, Ray Pohlman – bass
- Jim Yester, Tommy Tedesco, Russ Giguere, David Bennett Cohen, Mike Deasy, Dennis Budimir, Al Casey – guitars
- Larry Knechtel – piano, keyboards
- Milt Holland, Dale Anderson, Gene Estes, Larry Bunker – vibes, various percussion
- Red Callender – double bass, tuba
- James Decker, Arthur Maebe, William Hinshaw, David Duke – French horn
- Emanuel Klein, Jimmy Zito, Buddy Childers, Tony Terran, Bobby Bryant – trumpet
- Lew McCreary, David Wells – trombone
- James Decker, William Hinshaw – French horn
- John Johnson – saxophone
- Paulo Alencar, Arnold Belnick, Henry Ferber, Jacques Gasselin, Jerome Reisler, Ralph Schaeffer, Sidney Sharp, William Weiss, Shari Zippert – strings

=== Technical ===
- Bones Howe – producer, engineer
- Ed Thrasher – art direction
- Wayne Kimbell – design
- George Rodriguez – photography

== Charts ==
Chart (1968)	Peak position
US Billboard Top LPs	23
