= Stop Your Motor =

Studio album by The Association
- Released: July 1971
- Recorded: 1971
- Genre: Pop rock
- Length: 33:42
- Label: Warner Bros.
- Producer: The Association

The Association chronology
The Association Live (1970)	Stop Your Motor (1971)	Waterbeds in Trinidad! (1972)

Singles from Stop Your Motor
- 1. "Along the Way" Released: September 1970; 2. "P.F. Sloan" Released: May 1971; 3. "Bring Yourself Home" Released: August 1971; 4. "That's Racin" Released: October 1971

Stop Your Motor is the sixth studio album by American pop band the Association and their final album released on Warner Bros. Records. It marked the debut of keyboardist Richard Thompson, replacing original member Russ Giguere. The songs "That's Racin'" (original titled "I'm Going To Be A Racin' Star") and "The First Sound" were initially slated to be part of a proposed soundtrack for a documentary film about auto racing, Once Upon a Wheel, hosted by Paul Newman, but the soundtrack failed to materialise beyond a promotional level (sponsored by Coca-Cola). The title song from the documentary, as composed by Terry Kirkman, never saw an official release.

The album contained four singles; however, none of them charted and the album peaked at number 158 on Billboard Top LPs.

Professional ratings
Review scores
Source	Rating
AllMusic	2.5/5 stars

== Track listing ==
Side one
No.	Title	Writer(s)	Lead vocals	Length
1.	"Bring Yourself Home"	Ted Bluechel	Kirkman	4:06
2.	"Funny Kind of Song"	Jules Alexander	Alexander	3:22
3.	"That's Racin'"	Terry Kirkman	Cole	1:58
4.	"P.F. Sloan"	Jimmy Webb	Yester, Ramos, and Cole	4:08
5.	"Silver Morning"	Kirkman	Kirkman	5:13

Side two
No.	Title	Writer(s)	Lead vocals	Length
1.	"It's Gotta Be Real"	Larry Ramos	Ramos	2:19
2.	"The First Sound"	Kirkman, Richard Thompson	Kirkman	4:05
3.	"Along the Way"	Jim Yester	Yester	3:20
4.	"Traveller's Guide (Spanish Flyer)"	Brian Cole	Cole	2:17
5.	"Seven Virgins"	Jimmie Spheeris	Group	2:54

== Personnel ==
=== The Association ===
- Terry Kirkman – vocals, wind instruments, percussion
- Larry Ramos – lead guitar, vocals
- Jules Alexander – lead guitar, vocals
- Jim Yester – rhythm guitar, vocals, keyboards
- Brian Cole – bass, vocals, woodwinds
- Ted Bluechel, Jr – drums, vocals, rhythm guitar, bass
- Richard Thompson – keyboards

=== Technical ===
- The Association – producer
- John Tartaglia, Randy Steirling, Ray Pohlman – production staff
- Michael Shields, Stan Ross – engineers
- James Metropole – photography
- Patrick Colecchio – album coordinator

== Charts ==
Chart (1971)	Peak position
US Billboard Top LPs	158
