= Insight Out =

Studio album by the Association
- Released: June 8, 1967
- Recorded: March 27 – June 3, 1967
- Studio: United Western Recorders, Hollywood
- Genre: Folk rock
- Length: 32:05
- Label: Warner Bros.
- Producer: Bones Howe

The Association chronology
Renaissance (1966)	Insight Out (1967)	Birthday (1968)

Singles from Insight Out
- 1. "Windy" / "Sometime" Released: May 1, 1967; 2. "Never My Love" / "Requiem for the Masses" Released: August 9, 1967

Insight Out is the third album by the American pop band the Association and was released on June 8, 1967, on Warner Bros. Records. It was the band's first album release for the Warner Brothers label and it became one of the top selling LPs of the year in America, peaking at number 8 on the Billboard Top LPs chart and being certified gold by the Recording Industry Association of America. Critic Richie Unterberger has attributed much of the album's success to the inclusion of the U.S. hits "Windy" and "Never My Love", which reached number 1 and number 2 on the Billboard Hot 100 chart respectively and were among the most-played records on AM radio during the late 1960s.

== Recording ==
Insight Out was the first Association album to feature guitarist and vocalist Larry Ramos, who joined the band just prior to the album recording sessions, as a replacement for departed lead guitarist Jules Alexander. The album also saw the Association working with record producer and recording engineer Bones Howe for the first time. Howe, who had previously worked with the Mamas & the Papas and the Turtles, was brought in by the band's manager and Warner Bros., in an attempt to steer the group in a more commercial direction.

As a result of Howe's focus on obtaining a radio-friendly sound, the Association ceded much of the instrumental playing on Insight Out to a team of top L.A. session musicians, including drummer Hal Blaine, bassist Joe Osborn, keyboardist Larry Knechtel, guitarist Al Casey, and guitarist/sitarist Mike Deasy. The group also elected to record some songs written by non-band members, in contrast to their previous album, Renaissance, on which the band had written and performed all of their own music.

Unterberger and Bruce Eder have both commented that Insight Out saw the band mixing their textured vocal harmonies with an eclectic blend of influences, including baroque pop, folk rock, sunshine pop, psychedelia, and even elements of garage punk. Along with the hit singles "Windy" and "Never My Love", the pair have also cited songs such as P. F. Sloan's reflective "On a Quiet Night", the Addrisi Brothers' "Happiness Is", and the band originals "We Love Us", "When Love Comes to Me", and "Requiem for the Masses" as standout tracks on the album. The latter song in particular was an ambitious and somber piece written by multi-instrumentalist Terry Kirkman, featuring layered Latin vocals and anti-war lyrics, which use the story of a matador dying alone in the bullring, miles away from his home, as an analogy for the plight of U.S. soldiers serving in the Vietnam War. According to Kirkman, the idea for the song came to him while caught in a frightening snowstorm during a chartered flight to a concert in Milwaukee, Wisconsin.

== Release, reception and reissues ==
Insight Out was released in the U.S. on June 8, 1967, reaching number 8 on the Billboard Top LPs chart and being certified gold by the Recording Industry Association of America in December 1967. The album was less successful outside of North America, failing to chart in the United Kingdom.

Music critic Matthew Weiner, writing for Stylus magazine, has described Insight Out and its follow-up Birthday as "minor classics in the late-sixties pop genre", while Unterberger viewed the album, within the context of the Association's back catalogue, as "characteristically eclectic". In his review for the Allmusic website, Eder described Insight Out as "an enjoyable folk-rock album", but also noted that the album was recorded "somewhat in the shadow of Harpers Bizarre's experimental "Feelin' Groovy" single.

Insight Out has been reissued a number of times on CD, including a remastered edition of the album in its standard stereo configuration on Collectors' Choice Music in 2003 and as a Japanese release on Warner Bros. in 2005, with the addition of two bonus tracks. In 2011, Insight Out was reissued in a deluxe CD package by Cherry Red Records, featuring the original mono mix of the album and multiple bonus tracks.

== Track listing ==
Side one

1. "Wasn't It a Bit Like Now?" (Terry Kirkman) – 3:32 (lead vocal: Kirkman & Ramos)
2. "On a Quiet Night" (P. F. Sloan) – 3:22 (lead vocal: Yester)
3. "We Love Us" (Ted Bluechel) – 2:26 (lead vocal: Bluechel & Ramos)
4. "When Love Comes to Me" (Jim Yester) – 2:46 (lead vocal: Yester)
5. "Windy" (Ruthann Friedman) – 2:57 (lead vocal: Giguere & Ramos)
6. "Reputation" (Tim Hardin) – 2:38 (lead vocal: Cole)

Side 2

1. "Never My Love" (Addrisi Brothers) – 3:14 (lead vocal: Kirkman & Ramos)
2. "Happiness Is" (Addrisi Brothers) – 2:20 (lead vocal: Bluechel & Ramos)
3. "Sometime" (Russ Giguere) – 2:38 (lead vocal: Giguere)
4. "Wantin' Ain't Gettin" (Mike Deasy) – 2:20 (lead vocal: Cole & Giguere)
5. "Requiem for the Masses" (Kirkman) – 4:09 (lead vocal: Kirkman)

== Personnel ==
=== The Association ===
- Terry Kirkman – wind instruments, vocals, percussion
- Larry Ramos – lead guitar, vocals
- Russ Giguere – rhythm guitar, vocals, percussion
- Brian Cole – bass, vocals, woodwinds
- Ted Bluechel Jr. – drums, vocals, rhythm guitar, bass
- Jim Yester – rhythm guitar, vocals, keyboards

=== Additional musicians ===
According to the 2011 deluxe expanded mono edition and Just the Right Sound: The Association Anthology:

- Hal Blaine – drums
- Joe Osborn, Ray Pohlman – bass
- Mike Deasy, Dennis Budimir, Al Casey – guitars
- Larry Knechtel – piano, keyboards
- Gary Coleman – vibes, various percussion
- Arthur Briegleb, Gale Robinson, Vince DeRosa, Richard Perissi – French horns
- Jules Chaikin, Oliver Mitchell, Ian Freebairn-Smith – trumpets
- Bob Edmondson – trombone
- John T. Johnson, Gene Cipriano – saxophone
- Bud Shank – piccolo, flute
- Bones Howe – tambourine on "Never My Love"
- Clark Burroughs, Marilyn Burroughs, Bertie Jane Giguere, Jo-Ellen Yester, Jerry Yester, Ruthann Friedman – additional backing vocals on (tag of) "Windy"

=== Technical ===
- Bones Howe – producer, engineer
- Bill Holman, Clark Burroughs, Ray Polhman, The Association – arrangements
- Ed Thrasher – art direction
- Sherman Weisburd, Don Peterson – photography
