= And Then... Along Comes the Association =

Studio album by the Association
- Released: July 1966
- Recorded: March and May 1966
- Studio: Homewood, GSP and Columbia, Hollywood
- Genre: Pop rock; sunshine pop
- Length: 29:40
- Label: Valiant, Warner Bros.
- Producer: Curt Boettcher

The Association chronology
And Then... Along Comes the Association (1966)	Renaissance (1966)

Singles from And Then... Along Comes the Association
- 1. "Along Comes Mary" / "Your Own Love" Released: March 1966; 2. "Cherish" / "Don't Blame It on Me"" Released: August 1966

And Then... Along Comes the Association is the debut studio album by the Association, released on Valiant Records in July 1966. It became one of the top-selling albums in America, peaking at number five, and remains the Association's most successful album release, except for their Greatest Hits compilation. The album's success was primarily credited to the inclusion of their two U.S. hits "Along Comes Mary" and "Cherish", which peaked at number seven and number one respectively on the Billboard Hot 100; "Cherish" was number one on Billboard's Top 40 list for three weeks starting on September 24, 1966.

The album was preceded by a few non-LP singles as the Association struggled to establish themselves a commercial presence. Moving from the Jubilee record label to Valiant Records, the group released a cover version of Bob Dylan's "One Too Many Mornings", which received attention from Curt Boettcher. Boettcher, who had previously worked with the folk-rock group the GoldeBriars, and demoed "Along Comes Mary" with lead guitarist Jules Alexander, was brought in by the group to steer the Association in a pop-rock musical direction. Aside from "Along Comes Mary", the sessions with Boettcher provided the band with the song's B-side, "Your Own Love", and two other tracks that are featured on the album "Remember" and "I'll Be Your Man". The Association yielded some of the instrumental playing on And Then... Along Comes the Association to top L.A. session musicians, including guitarist Mike Deasy (who would continue to play on other Association albums), bassist Jerry Scheff, and percussionists Jim Troxel and Toxey French.

And Then... Along Comes the Association saw the group experiment with luscious vocal harmonies that anticipated the musical textures of Boettcher's later groups the Millennium and Sagittarius. In addition, the album incorporated a wide assortment of influences, including folk-rock, psychedelia, baroque pop, and remains a cornerstone of sunshine pop. Along with the hit singles "Along Comes Mary" and "Cherish", notable tracks on the album include the reflective "Enter the Young" and the Addrissi brothers' "Don't Blame It on Me". The partnership between the Association and Boettcher—while innovative and commercially successful—was cut short after Boettcher began to overreach his authority in the group's musical direction. For their sophomore effort, Renaissance, the Association recruited Jerry Yester to replace Boettcher as a producer.

Professional ratings
Review scores
Source	Rating
Allmusic	4/5 stars

== Track listing ==
Side one
No.	Title	Writer(s)	Lead vocals	Length
1.	"Enter the Young"	Terry Kirkman	Kirkman	2:45
2.	"Your Own Love"	Jules Alexander, Jim Yester	Giguere	2:19
3.	"Don't Blame It on Me"	Don Addrisi, Dick Addrisi	Giguere	2:30
4.	"Blistered"	Billy Edd Wheeler	Giguere	1:52
5.	"I'll Be Your Man"	Russ Giguere	Giguere	2:48
6.	"Along Comes Mary"	Tandyn Almer	Yester	2:46

Side two
No.	Title	Writer(s)	Lead vocals	Length
1.	"Cherish"	Kirkman	Kirkman and Giguere	3:27
2.	"Standing Still"	Ted Bluechel	Yester and Bluechel	2:47
3.	"Message of Our Love"	Almer, Curt Boettcher	Kirkman	4:06
4.	"Round Again"	Alexander	Kirkman and Giguere	1:49
5.	"Remember"	Alexander	Yester	2:36
6.	"Changes"	Alexander	Alexander	2:32

== Personnel ==
Adapted from the liner notes of Now Sounds 2011 reissue, except where noted:

The Association

- Jules Alexander – vocals, guitar
- Ted Bluechel Jr. – vocals
- Brian Cole – vocals
- Russ Giguere – vocals
- Terry Kirkman – vocals; recorder on "Along Comes Mary"
- Jim Yester – vocals

Additional musicians

- Jim Bell – oboe
- Ben Benay – guitar
- Hal Blaine – drums on "Along Comes Mary"
- Curt Boettcher – vocals, tone generator/oscillator
- Clark Burroughs – vocal arrangements
- Mike Deasy – guitar
- Toxey French – drums, percussion, vibraphone
- Mike Henderson – piano, keyboards
- Lee Mallory – guitar
- Butch Parker – piano, keyboards
- Doug Rhodes – celesta
- Jerry Scheff – bass guitar
- Jim Troxel – drums, percussion

Technical

- Curt Boettcher – producer
- Gary Paxton, Pete Romano – engineers
- Peter Whorf Graphics – album design
- Fred Poore – photography
- Phyllis Burgess – original liner notes

== Charts ==
Chart (1966)	Peak position
US Billboard Top LPs	5
