= Everything That Touches You =

Single by The Association

from the album Birthday
- B-side: "We Love Us"
- Released: 8 January 1968
- Recorded: 1967
- Genre: Progressive pop
- Length: 3:17
- Label: Warner Bros.-Seven Arts
- Songwriter: Terry Kirkman
- Producer: Bones Howe

The Association singles chronology
"Never My Love" (1967)	"Everything That Touches You" (1968)	"Time for Livin'" (1968)

"Everything That Touches You" is a song written by Terry Kirkman and originally released in 1968 by the American sunshine pop band the Association.

In the U.S., the song reached number 10 on the Billboard Hot 100 chart, number 22 on the Billboard Easy Listening chart and number 11 on the Cash Box Top 100 chart.

In Canada, the song reached number 6 on the RPM Top Singles chart.

== Chart performance ==
=== Weekly charts ===
Chart (1968)	Peak position
Canada Top Singles (RPM)	6
US Billboard Easy Listening	22
US Billboard Hot 100	10
US Cash Box Top 100	11
