= Brian Cole (musician) =

American bassist (1942–1972)

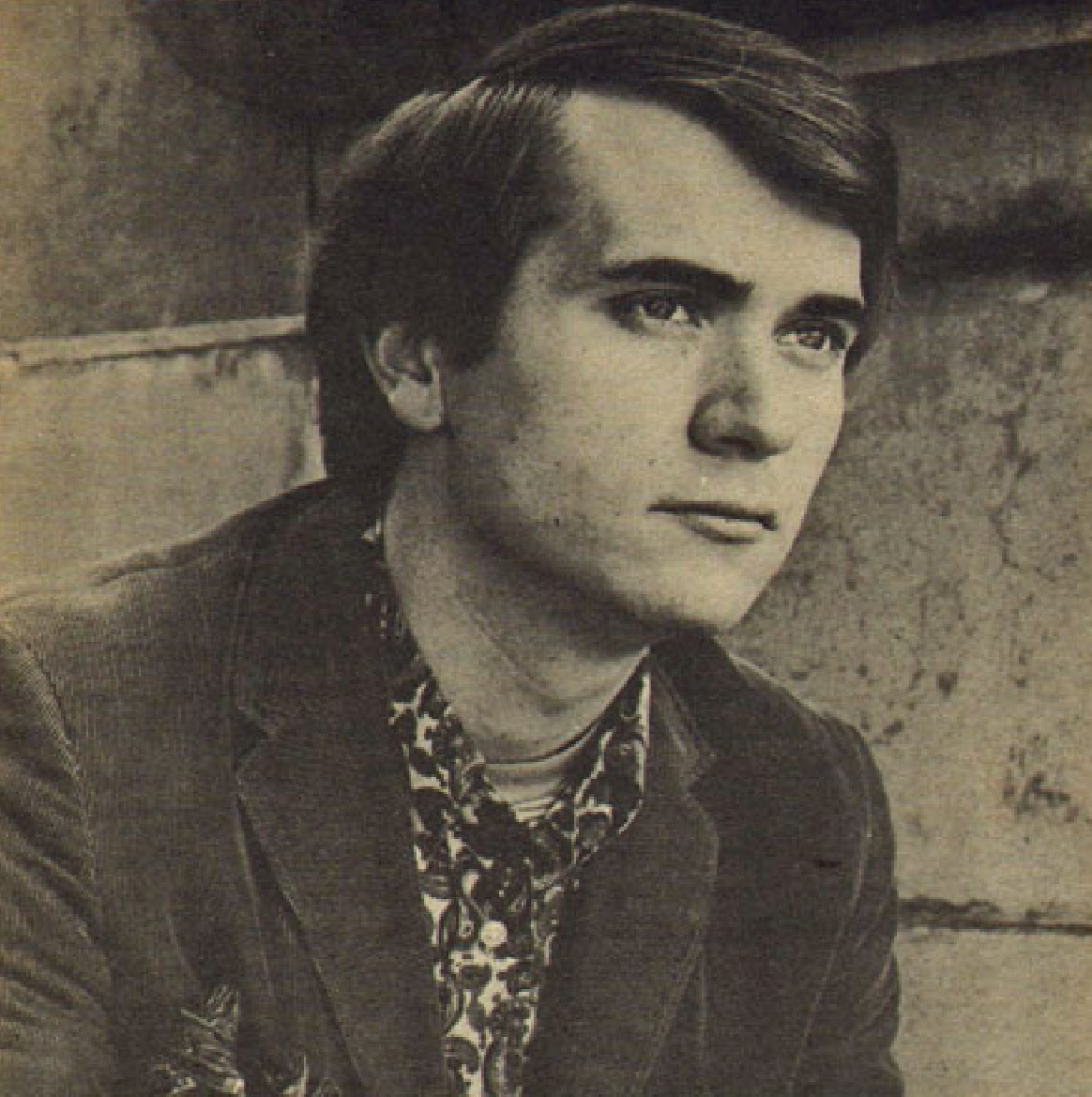
- Cole in 1967

Background information
- Born: Brian Leslie Cole; September 8, 1942; Tacoma, Washington, U.S.
- Died: August 2, 1972 (aged 29) Los Angeles, California, U.S.
- Occupation: Musician
- Instrument: Bass guitar
- Formerly of: The Association

Brian Leslie Cole (September 8, 1942 – August 2, 1972) was an American musician. He was the bass guitarist, bass vocalist and one of the founding members of the 1960s folk rock band the Association.

== Early life ==
Brian Leslie Cole was born in Tacoma, Washington, to Perry Anthony Cole and Violet Elanor Cole. By the early 1960s, he and his family were living in Portland, Oregon, and he was a father of two. Cole attended Portland State University, before dropping out a year later. Prior to working as a musician, he had moved to Los Angeles, and was working as a lumberjack, before he began work as an actor and comedian.

== The Association ==
In 1966, Cole co-founded the folk rock band The Association, a band that had previously been a thirteen-piece ensemble called The Men. The Association signed to Valiant Records in 1966, and released their debut album And Then... Along Comes the Association, shortly after. The Association are best known for their songs "Cherish", "Along Comes Mary", "Windy" and "Never My Love". The Association were an opening act at the Monterey Pop Festival. The group were known for their harmonies. Cole sang bass vocals in their songs.

Unlike the other members, Cole rarely sang lead, most notably singing lead on the song "Reputation", featured on the Association's 1967 album Insight Out. As a member of the Association, he was nominated for a Grammy Award six times, three times each in the 9th and 10th Annual Grammy Awards, which were held in 1967 and 1968, respectively.

In August 1969, a collection of poems, penned by the seven members of the Association, was released as the book Crank Your Spreaders.

== Personal life and death ==
He had three sons, Jordan, Chandler, and Brant. Jordan Cole is now a member of the Association, and has provided keyboards, guitar, vocals, recorder, and drums since 1999. Brant Cole is a drummer for the Los Angeles-based band Briana and the Fates.

Cole became a heavy drug user in his final years and died in Los Angeles of a heroin overdose in 1972 at the age of 29. Cole's last release with the Association was their album Waterbeds in Trinidad!, which was released four months prior.

Cole, once known for performing with a Gibson semi-hollow bass guitar onstage, had put the signature bass in his attic sometime in 1969 and it was passed on to his oldest son upon his death. In 1997, his son Jordan had it restored and has used it in recordings.

== Discography ==
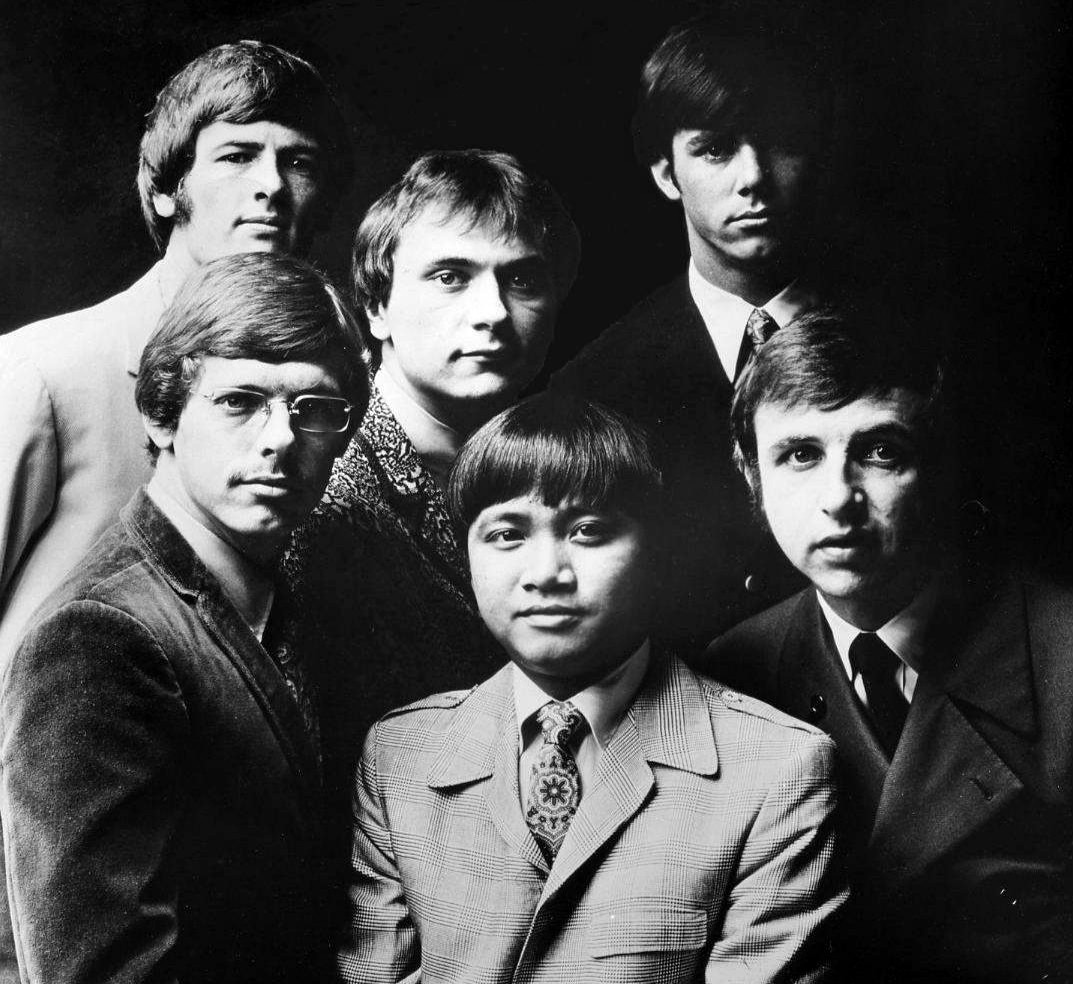
Cole (top middle) with The Association in 1968.

=== Albums ===
Title	Year
And Then... Along Comes the Association	1966
Renaissance	1966
Insight Out	1967
Birthday	1968
The Association	1969
Stop Your Motor	1971
Waterbeds in Trinidad!	1972

== Nominations ==
As a member of the Association, he has been nominated for a Grammy Award six times, three times each in the 9th and 10th Annual Grammy Awards:

=== 9th Annual Grammy Awards (1967) ===
Category	Song	Note
Best Contemporary Group Performance	Cherish	
Best Contemporary Recording	Cherish	
Best Performance By A Vocal Group	Cherish	

=== 10th Annual Grammy Awards (1968) ===
Category	Song/Album	Note
Best Contemporary Group Performance	Windy	
Best Contemporary Album	Insight Out	
Best Performance By A Vocal Group	Never My Love	

== See also ==
- List of basses in non-classical music
