= The Association (album) =

Studio album by the Association
- Released: August 1969
- Genre: Pop rock
- Label: Warner Bros.
- Producer: John Boylan, The Association

The Association chronology
Goodbye, Columbus (1969)	The Association (1969)	The Association Live (1970)

The Association is the Association's fifth studio album. In the US charts, the album peaked at number 32 in the last week of October 1969. In Canada the album reached number 12. None of the singles broke into Billboard's charts, but in Canada "Dubuque Blues" did reach number 76. The single "Goodbye Forever" was reworked from the previous album project, Goodbye, Columbus, as is heard in its lyrics about the relationship between the characters played by Richard Benjamin and Ali MacGraw in the film Goodbye, Columbus.

The album's musical style pushes the boundaries of pop rock. It was the first studio album to feature all seven members of the 1960s line-up (Terry Kirkman, Russ Giguere, Jules Alexander, Jim Yester, Larry Ramos, Brian Cole, Ted Bluechel Jr) and the last studio album featuring member Russ Giguere, who left for a solo career in 1971.

Professional ratings
Review scores
Source	Rating
Allmusic	3.5/5 stars

== Track listing ==
Side one
No.	Title	Writer(s)	Lead vocals	Length
1.	"Look at Me, Look at You"	Terry Kirkman	Kirkman	3:10
2.	"Yes I Will"	John Boylan	Giguere and Ramos	2:34
3.	"Love Affair"	Jules Alexander	Yester	4:07
4.	"The Nest"	Skip Carmel, Ted Bluechel	Cole and Bluechel	3:29
5.	"What Were the Words?"	Jim Yester	Yester	2:29
6.	"Are You Ready?"	Larry Ramos, Tony Ortega	Ramos	2:47

Side two
No.	Title	Writer(s)	Lead vocals	Length
1.	"Dubuque Blues"	Alexander	Alexander	3:18
2.	"Under Branches"	Alexander, Carmel	Group	4:24
3.	"I Am Up for Europe"	Brian Cole, Alexander	Cole	2:34
4.	"Broccoli"	Russ Giguere	Giguere	2:17
5.	"Goodbye Forever"	Alexander, Kirkman, Rita Martinson	Alexander	2:33
6.	"Boy on the Mountain"	Kirkman, Richard Thompson	Kirkman	4:35

== Personnel ==
- Terry Kirkman
- Russ Giguere
- Jules Alexander
- Jim Yester
- Larry Ramos
- Brian Cole
- Ted Bluechel Jr

== Charts ==
Chart (1969)	Peak position
US Billboard Top LPs	32
CAN RPM Top 60 Albums	12
