= Andy Chapin =

American musician (1952–1985)

- Born: February 7, 1952; Chicopee, Massachusetts; United States
- Died: December 31, 1985 (aged 33) De Kalb, Texas; United States
- Genres: Hard rock rockabilly Rock and roll pop
- Occupation: Musician
- Instrument: Keyboard
- Years active: 1975–1985
- Formerly of: Steppenwolf; The Association; Ricky Nelson

Andrew Robert Chapin (February 7, 1952 – December 31, 1985) was an American keyboardist best known for his short stint with the Ricky Nelson Band, which ended in 1985 when Nelson and his bandmates died after Nelson's personal DC-3 aircraft crashed on New Year's Eve in De Kalb, Texas while en route to a performance in Dallas, Texas. Prior to joining Ricky Nelson, Chapin had been a member of The Association and before that of Steppenwolf, with whom he had recorded Hour of the Wolf in 1975, the band's first album recorded without founding keyboardist Goldy McJohn. The official explanation for Chapin's departure from Steppenwolf was that he disliked touring; he was subsequently replaced by Wayne Cook.

== See also ==
- Death of Ricky Nelson
