= Waterbeds in Trinidad! =

Studio album by The Association
- Released: April 1972
- Length: 33:29
- Label: Columbia
- Producer: Lewis Merenstein

The Association chronology
Stop Your Motor (1971)	Waterbeds in Trinidad! (1972)	The Association 95: A Little Bit More (1995)

Waterbeds in Trinidad! (1972) is the seventh studio album (ninth album overall, counting a Greatest Hits collection and a live album) by The Association. This was the group's only release for Columbia Records and their last recorded project of the '70s.

It was also the last album to feature original bassist Brian Cole, who died that August. One final recording with Cole, the non-album track "Names, Tags, Numbers & Labels" written by Albert Hammond, was released as a single on the Mums label in 1973.

Waterbeds was the group's lowest charted album, reaching only #194 on the Billboard Top LPs list. However, it did reach #80 in Canada. Of the two singles released in conjunction with the album, The Association's rendition of The Lovin' Spoonful's "Darling Be Home Soon" bubbled under the Billboard top 100 chart at #104 and reached #64 in Canada.

Professional ratings
Review scores
Source	Rating
Allmusic	2/5 stars

== Track listing ==
Side one
No.	Title	Writer(s)	Lead vocals	Length
1.	"Silent Song Through the Land"	Ron Davies	Ramos	3:24
2.	"Darling Be Home Soon"	John Sebastian	Yester	3:44
3.	"Midnight Wind"	Jules Alexander, Steve Carey	Alexander	3:00
4.	"Come the Fall"	Terry Kirkman	Kirkman	3:43
5.	"Kicking the Gong Around"	Alexander, Carey	Alexander and Bluechel	3:30

Side two
No.	Title	Writer(s)	Lead vocals	Length
1.	"Rainbows Bent"	Alexander, Carey	Alexander and Ramos	2:28
2.	"Snow Queen"	Carole King, Gerry Goffin	Yester and Ramos	3:20
3.	"Indian Wells Woman"	Del Ramos, Larry Hickman, Larry Ramos	Ramos	3:26
4.	"Please Don't Go ('Round the Bend)"	Alexander	Group	3:24
5.	"Little Road and a Stone to Roll"	John Stewart	Cole	3:37

== Personnel ==
- Jules Alexander - lead guitar, vocals
- Larry Ramos - lead guitar, vocals
- Terry Kirkman - keyboards, vocals, harmonica, saxophone
- Richard Thompson - keyboards, vocals
- Jim Yester - rhythm guitar, vocals
- Brian Cole - bass, vocals
- Ted Bluechel - drums, percussion, vocals

== Charts ==
Chart (1972)	Peak position
US Billboard Top LPs & Tape	194
CAN RPM Top 100 Albums	80
