= The Association =

American pop band

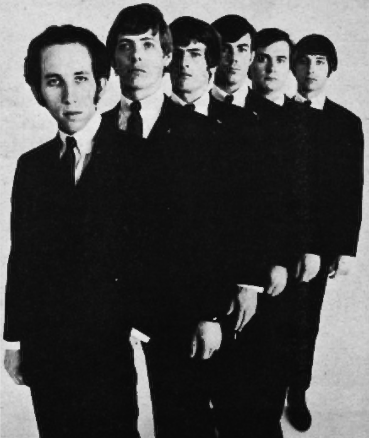
- The Association in 1966; From left: Jules Alexander, Russ Giguere, Jim Yester, Ted Bluechel Jr., Brian Cole, Terry Kirkman

Background information
- Origin: Los Angeles, California, U.S.
- Genres: Sunshine pop; psychedelic pop; folk rock
- Years active: 1965–1978, 1979–present
- Labels: Jubilee; Valiant; Warner Bros.; Columbia; Mums; RCA; Elektra
- Members: Jules Alexander; Jim Yester; Joe Lamanno; Bruce Pictor; Paul Holland; Gary Swan
- Past members: Larry Ramos; Russ Giguere; Terry Kirkman; Brian Cole; Ted Bluechel, Jr.; Bob Page; Richard Thompson; Wolfgang Melz; Mike Berkowitz; Maurice Miller; Art Johnson; David Vaught; Jerry Yester; Dwayne Smith; Andy Chapin; Larry Brown; Jay Gruska; David Morgan; Cliff Woolley; Ric Ulsky; Russ Levine; John William Tuttle; Jack Harris; Keith Moret; Paul Beach; Brian Puckett; Donni Gougeon; Mike Peed; Chris Urmston; Del Ramos; Jordan Cole; Bob Werner; David Jackson; Blair Anderson; Godfrey Townsend
- Website: www.theassociationwebsite.com

The Association is an American sunshine pop band from Los Angeles, California. During the late 1960s, the band had numerous hits at or near the top of the Billboard charts (including "Windy", "Cherish", "Never My Love" and "Along Comes Mary") and were the opening act at 1967's Monterey Pop Festival. Generally consisting of six to eight members, they are known for intricate vocal harmonies by the band's multiple singers.

Their best-known lineup included Terry Kirkman (vocals, woodwind instruments, percussion), Russ Giguere (vocals, guitar), Jim Yester (vocals, rhythm and lead guitar), Jules Alexander (vocals, lead and rhythm guitar, bass), Brian Cole (vocals, bass) and Ted Bluechel Jr. (vocals, drums, percussion). This lineup recorded their first two albums, And Then... Along Comes the Association and Renaissance (both 1966) before Larry Ramos replaced Alexander in early 1967. With Ramos, the group recorded their third and fourth albums, Insight Out and Birthday. Alexander re-joined in late 1968, and the group released their fifth album The Association in 1969. Keyboardist Richard Thompson replaced Giguere in 1970, with whom the band recorded their final two albums Stop Your Motor (1971) and Waterbeds in Trinidad! (1972). The group has since been through several lineup changes. The current lineup includes Alexander, Yester and longtime members Joe Lamanno, Gary Swan, Bruce Pictor and Paul Holland.

== History ==
=== Beginnings ===
Jules Alexander was in Hawaii in 1962 serving a stint in the Navy when he met Terry Kirkman, a visiting salesman. The two young musicians jammed together and promised to get together once Alexander was discharged. That happened a year later; the two eventually moved to Los Angeles and began exploring the city's music scene in the mid-1960s, often working behind the scenes as directors and arrangers for other music acts. At the same time, Kirkman played in groups with Frank Zappa for a short period before Zappa went on to form the Mothers of Invention.

Eventually, at a Monday night hootenanny at the Los Angeles nightclub The Troubadour in 1964, an ad hoc group called the Inner Tubes was formed by Kirkman, Alexander and Doug Dillard, whose rotating membership contained, at one time or another, Cass Elliot, David Crosby and many others who drifted in and out. This led, in the fall of 1964, to the forming of the Men, a 13-piece folk rock band. This group had a brief spell as the house band at The Troubadour.

After a short time, however, the Men disbanded, with six of the members electing to go out on their own in February 1965. At the suggestion of Kirkman's then-fiancée, Judy, they took the name the Association. The original lineup consisted of Alexander (using his middle name, Gary, on the first two albums) on vocals and lead guitar; Kirkman on vocals and a variety of wind, brass and percussion instruments; Brian Cole on vocals, bass and woodwinds; Russ Giguere on vocals, percussion and guitar; Ted Bluechel Jr. from the Cherry Hill Singers on drums, guitar, bass and vocals; and Brian Cole's friend and bandmate from the group Gnu Fokes, Bob Page on guitar, banjo and vocals. However, Page was replaced by Jim Yester on vocals, guitar and keyboards before any of the group's public performances.

The new band spent about five months rehearsing before they began performing around the Los Angeles area, most notably a regular stint at The Ice House in Pasadena (where Giguere had worked as lighting director) and its sister club, The Ice House in Glendale. Eventually, the small Jubilee label issued a single of "Babe I'm Gonna Leave You", a song originally recorded by Joan Baez and later popularized by Led Zeppelin, but nothing happened. Finally, Valiant Records offered them a contract, with the first result being a version of Bob Dylan's "One Too Many Mornings", which was produced by Valiant's owner, Barry De Vorzon, at Gold Star Studios.

The Men were first managed by Doug Weston, owner of the Troubador, before switching to actor Dean Fredericks, who remained on board when the Association was formed and helped get them the Valiant deal. In 1966 Fredericks turned the reins over to Pat Colecchio, who managed the group for the next eight years, then on and off during the two years after that. Fredericks later sued the band for breach of contract and was awarded a settlement.

=== First success ===
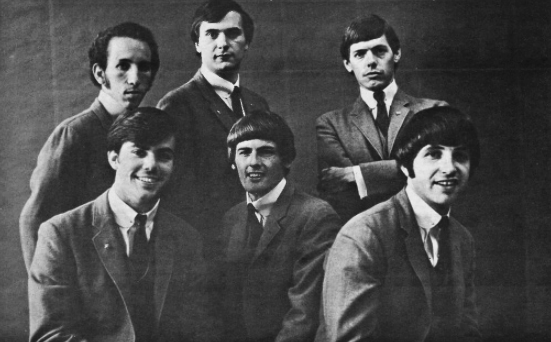
The band in 1966. Top row: from left to right; Alexander, Cole, Giguere. Bottom row: from left to right; Bluechel, Yester, Kirkman.

Their national break came with the song "Along Comes Mary", written by Tandyn Almer. Alexander first heard the song when he was hired to play on a demo version and persuaded Almer to give the Association first dibs on it, with Jim Yester on lead vocals. The song was controversial with some media observers noting that "Mary" was street slang for marijuana, but it went to No. 7 on the Billboard charts and led to the group's first album, And Then... Along Comes the Association (July 1966), produced by Curt Boettcher and begun in Gary S. Paxton's garage, with vocals done separately at Columbia. Another song from the album, "Cherish", written by Kirkman, became the Association's first No. 1 hit in September 1966 and one of a handful of the Sixties' most popular "slow dance" ballads.

The group followed with their second album, Renaissance, released in November 1966. The band changed producers, dropping Boettcher in favor of Jerry Yester (brother of Jim and formerly of the Modern Folk Quartet and later, a member of the Lovin' Spoonful). The album did not spawn any major hits (the highest-charting single, "Pandora's Golden Heebie Jeebies", stalled at No. 35), and the album only reached No. 34, compared with the No. 5 showing for And Then... Along Comes the Association.

=== Crest ===
In late 1966, Warner Bros. Records, which had been distributing Valiant, bought the smaller label and, with it, the Association's contract.

In 1966, a collection of poems penned by the six members was released as Crank Your Spreaders; the book was reprinted in August 1969.

In April 1967, Alexander left the band to study meditation in India and was replaced by Larry Ramos (born Hilario Ramos) on vocals and guitar. Ramos joined the band while Alexander was still performing with them after bassist Cole's hand was injured by a firecracker; Alexander subbed on bass while Ramos played lead guitar. Ramos had previously performed with the New Christy Minstrels and had even recorded solo singles for Columbia Records. He went on to sing co-lead (along with Giguere and Kirkman) on two of the Association's biggest hit singles, "Windy" and "Never My Love".

With the lineup settled, the group returned to the studio, this time with Bones Howe in the producer's chair. The first fruits of this pairing were the single "Windy", written by Ruthann Friedman, topping the Billboard Hot 100 on July 1, 1967, and staying there for four consecutive weeks, preceded by the album Insight Out, which reached No. 8 in June.

On June 16, 1967, the Association was the first act to perform at the Monterey Pop Festival. (The Criterion Collection DVD of the festival includes their performance of "Along Comes Mary" on disc 3.)

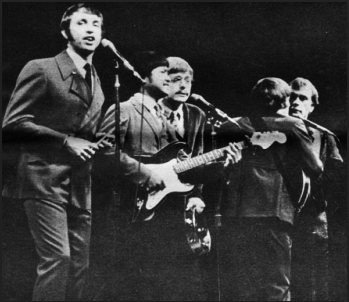
The Association performing at the Monterey Pop Festival. From left: Terry Kirkman, Larry Ramos, Russ Giguere, Jim Yester, Brian Cole.

The group's success continued with its next single, "Never My Love", written by Dick and Don Addrisi; it went to No. 2 in Billboard and No. 1 in Cash Box in October 1967. It became the group's only double-sided charted record, as its B-side, "Requiem for the Masses", made a brief showing on the Billboard chart. Like "Cherish" and "One Too Many Mornings", "Never My Love"'s vocal arrangement was provided by Clark Burroughs, former member of the Hi-Lo's. "Never My Love" has since been certified the second-most-frequently-played song in America during the 20th century (the group placed two other songs, "Cherish" and "Windy", on BMI's list of the 100 most played).

In 1968, after turning down a cantata composed by Jimmy Webb that included the now-classic "MacArthur Park", the group produced its fourth album, Birthday (March 1968), with Bones Howe again at the controls. This album spawned "Everything That Touches You", the group's last Hot 100 Top 10 hit, and "Time for Livin'", the group's final Hot 100 Top 40 hit.

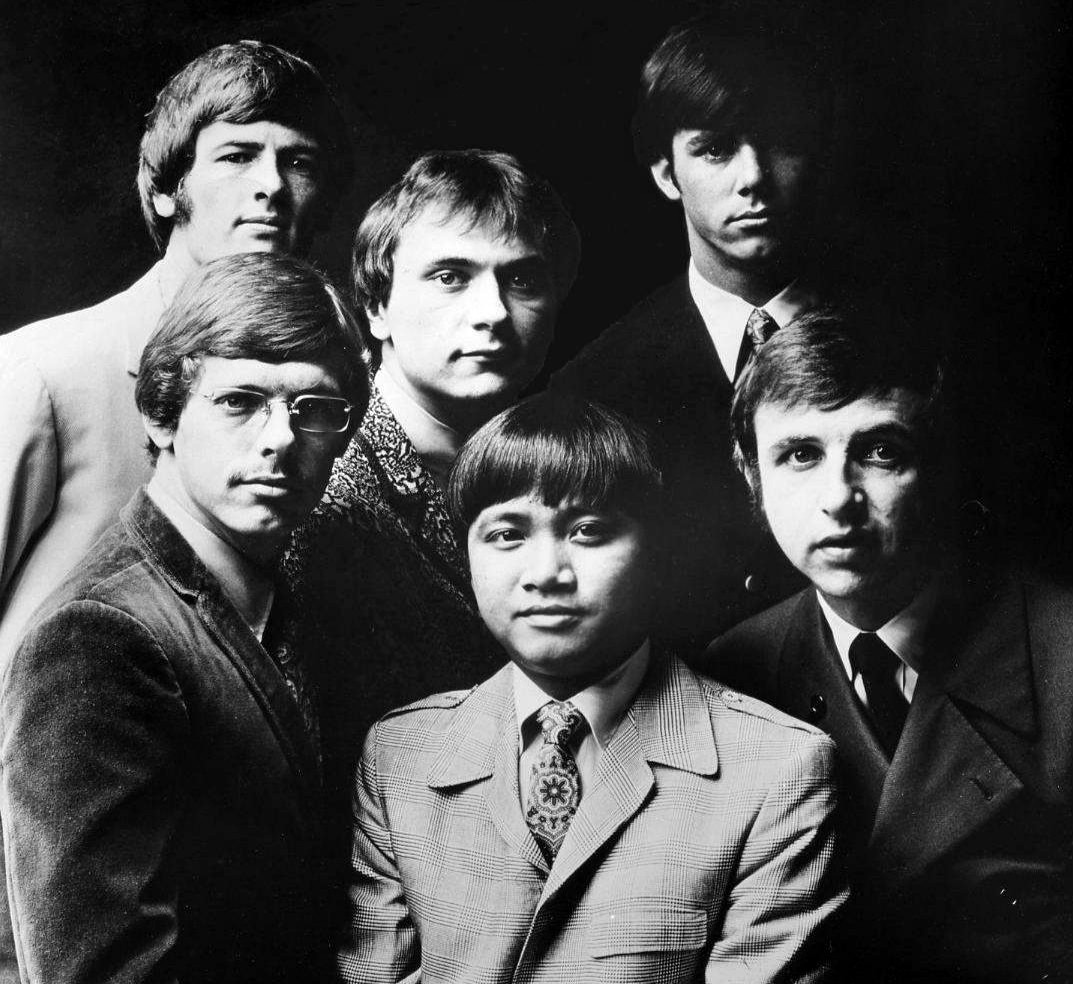
The group in 1967. Top row, from left: Jim Yester, Brian Cole, Ted Bluechel. Bottom row: Russ Giguere, Larry Ramos, Terry Kirkman

Later that year, the group released a self-produced single, the harder-edged "Six Man Band". This song also appeared on Greatest Hits, released in November 1968.

=== Comings and goings ===
At the close of 1968, Alexander, who had returned from India and had done a stint with another band called Joshua Fox, returned to the group, which now made the Association a seven-man band.

The larger band's first project was to contribute to the soundtrack for Goodbye, Columbus (1969), the film version of Philip Roth's best-selling novel. The title track, written by Yester, peaked at No. 80. John Boylan, one third of the little-known group Hamilton Streetcar, worked with the group on the soundtrack and stayed on board for its next album, The Association (August 1969). Many of the tracks on this album have a country-rock sound but none of the singles released made any impact, so the group re-teamed with Curt Boettcher in late 1969 for a one-off single, "Just About the Same" (released in February 1970), a reworking of a song Boettcher had recorded with his group, the Millennium. This too failed to catch on.

Despite all this, the band remained a popular concert draw, and on April 3, 1970, a Salt Lake City performance was recorded for The Association Live.

In June 1970, Giguere left the band; he released a solo album, Hexagram 16, the following year. The Association replaced him with keyboardist Richard Thompson (not to be confused with the English singer-songwriter/guitarist), who had contributed to previous albums and began playing live with the group for some July 4 & 5 appearances in Atlantic City. Thompson had previously been known primarily in jazz circles.

The album Stop Your Motor was released in July 1971. It was the group's least popular up to that date, reaching only No. 158 on the Billboard chart. Stop Your Motor marked the end of the Association's tenure at Warner Brothers.

In early 1972, they resurfaced on Columbia with Waterbeds in Trinidad! (April 1972), produced by Lewis Merenstein (best known for producing Van Morrison's Astral Weeks). The album fared even less well than Stop Your Motor, reaching No. 194, while a single of the Lovin' Spoonful's "Darlin' Be Home Soon" failed to break the Hot 100.

=== Breakup and reformation ===
For their 1972 tour, the group expanded, bringing in first session bass player Wolfgang Melz, and then Mike Berkowitz on drums, to add more musical versatility on stage and free up Brian Cole and Ted Bluechel to concentrate on singing. But on August 2, 1972, 29-year-old Cole was found dead in his Los Angeles home of a heroin overdose.

For the rest of the 1970s, the Association was in a state of flux, releasing singles intermittently along with sporadic touring.

In September 1972 Kirkman departed, as did Melz and Berkowitz later on that fall. The group was then moved over to the CBS distributed Mums label and put out a new single, Albert Hammond's "Names, Tags, Numbers & Labels", in February 1973. It failed to make much of an impression, though, and the label's funding for a hoped for album by the group never materialized. Mums folded by the end of 1974.

In late 1972, the remaining quintet of Alexander, Bluechel, Yester, Ramos and Thompson brought in new members Maurice Miller (vocals, drums, percussion, formerly of Charles Wright & the Watts 103rd Street Rhythm Band) and David Vaught (vocals, bass, fresh from a stint in the band Rosebud and later a member of the Lopez Beatles, who later played in the first lineup of Roger McGuinn's Thunderbyrd in 1976 and who died on March 20, 2013, from pancreatic cancer) and continued touring.

Jim Yester left in the late summer of 1973 and was briefly replaced by his brother Jerry (who, like Vaught, had just played in Rosebud). Jim Yester returned a short time later when Alexander left in late 1973, eventually to join Giguere and former Honey Ltd. female vocalists Alex Sliwin, Joan Sliwin and Marsha Temmer in a new outfit, Bijou. Jerry Yester stayed with the Association until the end of 1974 and pianist Thompson also left at that time. Dwayne Smith (vocals, keyboards) was then brought in.

In 1975 the band signed with RCA Records where they released two singles, "One Sunday Morning" (produced in Canada by Jack Richardson) and "Sleepy Eyes". An album called The Association Bites Back was to follow but was never released.

During this period, the band was offered a production deal with Mike Curb, who wanted them to record a disco version of the prior hits, "Cherish", "No Fair At All" and an original song which Larry Brown wrote and sang entitled "It's High Time To Get High". The deal did not go through.

Membership was fluid in 1975–1976. Smith had joined in December 1974 and appeared on "One Sunday Morning" but was replaced by Andy Chapin by the end of 1975. Ramos departed as well in mid-1975 and was replaced by Art Johnson, then the aforementioned Larry Brown (vocals, guitar). The increased tour schedule led to Chapin's departure in 1976 (he later played for artist Ricky Nelson and perished along with Nelson and his band when his plane crashed on December 31, 1985). Chapin was replaced, first by Jay Gruska, who then left for a stint with Three Dog Night, and then by David Morgan (who later joined Three Dog Night himself) in mid-1976.

In 1977 Bluechel, Jim Yester, and the current lineup recorded new versions of "Windy", "Cherish", "Never My Love", "Along Comes Mary" and "Everything That Touches You" with session players for K-tel Records that later ended up on a 1983 album collection, Back to Back, where one half of the record was the Association songs and the other half tunes by the Turtles.

During the spring of 1977, Brown left to concentrate on session work and keyboardist Ric Ulsky joined, leaving Jim Yester as sole guitarist in the lineup. But by the summer of that same year, with the prime gigs proving to be fewer and far between, Yester left, leaving Bluechel as the only original member. Yester was replaced by lead guitarist Cliff Woolley and the group had two keyboardists for a short time in 1977–78, Ulsky and David Morgan, before Morgan was succeeded by guitarist/singer John William Tuttle (son of makeup artist William Tuttle; John died on August 17, 1991, at age 41 of a perforated ulcer in Van Nuys, California).

Russ Levine (who had played with Bobby Womack, Donna Summer and Ultimate Spinach) also arrived in 1978 to take over drums from Maurice Miller (who went on to play with Lena Horne, and died of complications from diabetes October 10, 2005, in Burbank, California, at age 73) on drums. A short time after that, guitarist Jack Harris took over from Woolley. Jerry Yester also returned for several gigs with the group in the fall of 1978.

The band dissolved shortly afterward, leaving Bluechel with a huge debt. To help clear away some of it, in November 1978, he leased the group's name to a company that put a fake "Association" out on the road.

In September 1979 the surviving key members Kirkman, Alexander, Giguere, Bluechel, Yester and Ramos combined with Richard Thompson and seasoned studio bassist and arranger Ray Pohlman to reunite the Association at the Ambassador Hotel's Coconut Grove nightclub in Los Angeles for an HBO special called Then and Now (Kirkman was working for HBO at the time). The following year the reunited group also appeared at a charity show hosted in Dallas by Ed McMahon called Ed McMahon and Company that ran on the Showtime cable network in August 1980.

This led, in the early 1980s, to the band recording some self-financed demos and then a short-lived deal with Elektra Records resulting in a few singles (one of which, "Dreamer", reunited them with producer Bones Howe and made the Hot 100 with virtually no promotion) and more touring.

In 1980 the surviving originals (with Ulsky returning in place of Thompson, Levine back on drums subbing for an ill Bluechel and Alexander taking over the bass) went back on the road for a concert tour, putting the short-lived bogus band out of business.

=== Happy Together Again and the 1960s package tours ===
Jim Yester left again in June 1983 and the group added Keith Moret (bass, backing vocals) as Alexander went back to playing guitar. Moret stayed only briefly until Joe Lamanno (who had once done a brief fill-in stint with the group back in late 1972) joined during July 1983.

In 1984 the group was invited to appear on the Happy Together Again tour, a multi-bill of 1960s acts produced by David Fishof (who had taken over the band's management from Pat Colecchio in 1981; Colecchio died of colon cancer on June 3, 2008), headlined by the Turtles, and also including Gary Puckett and Spanky McFarlane of Spanky & Our Gang. Gary's brother, Brian Puckett, played drums in the show for Gary and McFarlane and likewise joined the Association for their set as well. During the latter part of the tour, Mike Peed joined on keyboards in place of Ulsky but left himself in November 1984, turning it over to Donni Gougeon (from Joshua Perahia's band). But by the end of the year, there was a mass exodus as Kirkman (who had already turned in his notice in September), Bluechel, Lamanno and Brian Puckett all departed.

In February 1985 the band carried on as Alexander, Giguere, Ramos and Gougeon recruited new members: Paul Beach (vocals, bass, who had also played in the Happy Together Again show band) and Bruce Pictor (vocals, drums, percussion, who had played alongside Beach in Puckett's group in the early 1980s).

Gougeon was replaced in early 1987 by Chris Urmston but was himself succeeded by Paul Holland later the same year. In 1989, when Beach quit, Holland switched over to bass as Gougeon then rejoined for a ten-year stint from 1989 to 1999 before illness in his family called him away. He was replaced by Jordan Cole, son of the band's original bassist, Brian Cole; Jordan first played with the band on a Caribbean Christmas cruise in December 1998, when he was asked to fill in for Holland on bass.

Besides the Happy Together tour, the group became mainstays on many other 1960s package tours, including the 1988 Super 60s Tour with Gary Puckett, the Grass Roots, and the Turtles; and Dick Clark's American Bandstand Tour in 1989, alongside the Spinners, the Guess Who and the Drifters, sponsored by VH1.

Alexander turned in his notice in early 1989. Larry Ramos's brother Del, who had started audio mixing for the group in the 1970s, and then again in the early 1980s, and had begun adding his voice to the mix from the sound board from 1985 on, also assumed bass duties in 1999 after Holland left to tend to his light and sound company. Bob Werner (vocals, guitar, bass), who had been the band's light man and road manager in 1974–75 and fill-in member as needed from 1994 on, was also a member of the group from 1999 to 2008.

During the 1980s and 1990s, the group's recorded output was minimal. They recorded a few new tracks and some covers of popular 1960s songs for a few compilation albums on the Hitbound label made through RadioShack's Tandy Corporation in the mid-1980s. These recordings included their first cover of "Walk Away Renée", which was recorded in collaboration with their original producer, Curt Boettcher, for the Mike Love and Dean Torrence 1983 cassette tape Rock 'n' Roll City. They contributed two Christmas covers to another Radio Shack album, Scrooge's Rock 'n' Roll Christmas (that was also a 1984 TV special). In 1983 they recorded an album of 1960s tunes called New Memories. They re-recorded some of their older material and even more cover songs for another album, Vintage, for CBS in 1983. They released yet another album comprising covers, The Association 95: A Little Bit More, in 1995 through On Track Records (located in New York City), produced by John Allen Orofino and Stan Vincent. The featured single from A Little Bit More was their second rendition of the Left Banke's 1966 hit "Walk Away Renée".

Over the years the group were sometimes visited by former members: Bluechel and Alexander sat in on a few of their 2001 shows, while Paul Holland guested on their DVD, Pop Legends Live!, which came out in 2005. And in September 2003, they were inducted into the Vocal Group Hall of Fame, joined by Yester, Alexander, Kirkman and Bluechel at the induction ceremony at Cafaro Field in Niles, Ohio. Yester, Alexander, Kirkman and Bluechel again rejoined the others for the taping of a PBS 1960s rock music special 60s Experience on December 9, 2004, at Dover Downs Showroom in Dover, Delaware.

In 2007 David Jackson (bass, guitar, formerly of Hearts & Flowers and Dillard & Clark) came into the group for a brief stint when Del Ramos was ill, then Jim Yester returned to sub for Werner. After which, Werner and Yester alternated in the group until late 2008 when Werner left altogether. Also in 2007, they joined Barry Manilow on a remake combining their two biggest hits, "Cherish" and "Windy", that was released on his Greatest Hits of the '60s album.

In 2008 drummer Pictor underwent back surgery. Blair Anderson (Yester's friend from the New Four Preps) sat in for Pictor until he was able to rejoin his bandmates that November.

By 2010, the band included Giguere, Ramos, Jim Yester, Del Ramos, Pictor and Jordan Cole. The Association continued to tour, mostly on bills with similar styled acts of the late 1960s, like the Grass Roots, the Buckinghams, Tommy James and Gary Puckett.

During the summer of 2011, the Association carried a heavy touring schedule throughout the U.S. as part of the Happy Together: 2011 tour, along with the Grass Roots, Mark Lindsay, the Buckinghams and the Turtles featuring Flo & Eddie. The Happy Together appearances featured only Giguere, Ramos and Yester, who were backed up by the Happy Together show band. In late 2011, Ramos was sidelined due to illness, so guitarist Godfrey Townsend (from the Happy Together and Hippiefest back-up bands) subbed for him. In January 2012, Alexander came back to the band as Ramos's stand-in and stayed after Ramos returned in March.

In 2013 Alexander, Giguere, Ramos and Yester became part of the "Where the Action Is" tour that included Mary Wilson of the Supremes, Paul Revere and the Raiders and Mitch Ryder.

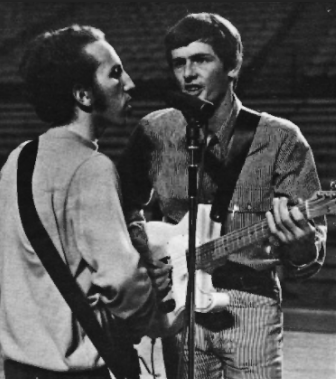
Alexander and Yester in 1966

Shindig Magazine named the Now Sounds reissue of the album The Association the best reissue of 2013.

In January 2014 it was announced that both Giguere and Ramos were retiring from touring. Giguere intended to move behind the scenes to the group's management, while Ramos's final performance with the group was a cancer benefit concert on February 24, 2014, at the Blue Fox Theater in Grangeville, Idaho. Upon returning from spending his 72nd birthday in Hawaii, Ramos died from melanoma on April 30. After Ramos' death, former member Paul Holland was brought back into the group, this time as a guitarist/vocalist.

As of 2014, founding members Jim Yester and Jules Alexander led the current line-up of the Association, which included Bruce Pictor, Paul Holland, Del Ramos, and Jordan Cole. In the summers of 2015, 2017 and 2018, the Association again joined the 'Happy Together' tour.

The Association was inducted into the Pop Music Hall of Fame's 2016 class in Canonsburg, Pennsylvania.

In May 2016 Texas guitarist Paul Wilson filled in for Paul Holland at an Association performance in Monroe, Wisconsin. Wilson also subbed for Holland on two occasions in 2018: two shows during the "Flower Power Cruise" in late February in the Caribbean, and then again in May for one show at the Golden Nugget Casino in Las Vegas, Nevada. Then in October 2018, Jim Yester was unable to perform two concerts. So for those appearances, in Red Rock, Oklahoma and Bangor, Maine, the lineup consisted of Alexander, Del Ramos, Cole, Pictor, Holland and Wilson. Concerts then resumed in 2019 with the regular lineup.

Art Johnson, who played guitar briefly for the group in 1975, died in 2018.

The Association were recipients of the Rock Justice Awards on January 19, 2019, at Village Studios in Los Angeles. All five surviving founding members – Kirkman, Alexander, Yester, Giguere and Bluechel – showed up to receive their awards. Ramos and founding member Cole also received awards.

In March 2020 Russ Giguere's autobiography (co-written with Ashley Wren Collins), Along Comes The Association: Beyond Folk Rock and Three-Piece Suits, was released. Mid-1970s Association keyboardist Dwayne Smith died in June 2020.

Bob Page died on December 24, 2022, at age 79 from a head injury in Faial Island.

Terry Kirkman died on September 23, 2023, at the age of 83.

Jordan Cole left the band on October 1, 2025. He was replaced by Gary Swan, who played his first gig with the band in Holmdel, New Jersey on October 12.

In November 2025 the Association's website announced that after a concert in San Francisco, California on November 23, Del Ramos would retire. His replacement is Joe Lamanno, who returned to the group after previous playing with them from July to November 1984. Lammano's first show with the band after his return was on November 28.

In the summer of 2026, Jules Alexander, Paul Holland and Bruce Pictor represented the group on that year's Happy Together Tour, supported by the Happy Together Show backing band.

== Million sellers ==
Three songs by the Association have sold over one million copies and have been certified platinum discs: "Cherish", "Windy", and "Never My Love".

== Band members ==
=== Current ===
- Jules Alexander – lead and rhythm guitar, vocals (1965–1967, 1968–1973, 1979–1989, 2012–present)
- Jim Yester – rhythm and lead guitar, vocals (1965–1973, 1973–1977, 1979–1983, 2007–present) (Note: Not touring as of 2024.)
- Joe Lamanno – bass, vocals (1984, 2025-present)
- Bruce Pictor – drums, vocals (1985–present)
- Paul Holland – lead and rhythm guitar, vocals (2014–present), bass, vocals (1989–1999), keyboards, vocals (1987–1989)
- Gary Swan – keyboards, vocals (2025–present)

== Discography ==
=== Studio albums ===
- And Then... Along Comes the Association – Valiant VLM-5002/VLS-25002 (No. 5, 1966) (US: Gold)
  Reissued in 1967 on Warner Bros. W-1702/WS-1702
  Expanded Mono Edition Reissued in 2011 on CD by Now Sounds CRNOW 25
- Renaissance – Valiant VLM-5004/VLS-25004 (No. 34 1966)
  Reissued in 1967 on Warner Bros. W-1704/WS-1704
  Expanded Mono Edition Reissued in 2011 on CD by Now Sounds CRNOW 27
- Insight Out – Warner Bros. W-1696/WS-1696 (No. 8, 1967) (US: Gold)
  Expanded Mono Edition Reissued in 2011 on CD by Now Sounds CRNOW 29
- Birthday – Warner Bros. W-1733/WS-1733 (No. 23, 1968)
  Mono Edition Reissued in 2010 on CD by Now Sounds CRNOW 15
- The Association – Warner Bros. WS-1800 (No. 32, 1969) (No. 12 Canada)
  Expanded Edition Reissued in 2013 on CD by Now Sounds CRNOW 43
- Stop Your Motor – Warner Bros. WS-1927 (No. 158, 1971)
- Waterbeds in Trinidad! – Columbia KC-31348 (No. 194, 1972) (No. 80 Canada)

=== Other releases ===
- Greatest Hits – Warner Bros. WS-1767 (No. 4, 1968) (No. 2 CAN 1969)
- Goodbye, Columbus (soundtrack) – Warner Bros. WS-1786 (No. 99, 1969)
- The Association "Live" – Warner Bros. 2WS-1868 (No. 79, 1970) (No. 28 Canada)
- New Memories – Hitbound Records 51-3022 (1983) (by various artists, including the Association, Bobby Vee, Mary McGregor and Mike Love)
- Vintage – CBS Special Products BT-19223 (1983)
- The Association 95: A Little Bit More – Track Records (1995)
- Just the Right Sound: The Association Anthology (Double CD, released in 2002 as Warner Bros. / Rhino R2 78303, including two previously unreleased outtakes ('The Machine', 'Better Times') from 1966. An import variation also includes the outtake 'Caney Creek')
- The Complete Warner Bros. & Valiant Singles Collection (Double CD, released in 2012) – Now Sounds CRNOW 35D

=== Singles ===
Year	Single (A-side, B-side) Both sides from same album except where indicated	Label & No.	Peak chart positions					Certification	Album
Year	Single (A-side, B-side) Both sides from same album except where indicated	Label & No.	US	US Cashbox	CAN	AUS	UK	Certification	Album
1965	"Babe I'm Gonna Leave You" b/w "Baby, Can't You Hear Me Call Your Name"	Jubilee 5505	—	—	—	—	—		Non-album tracks
1965	"One Too Many Mornings" b/w "Forty Times"	Valiant 730	—	—	—	—	—		Non-album tracks
1966	"Along Comes Mary" b/w "Your Own Love"	Valiant 741	7	9	8	—	52 (Note: Chart position is from the official UK "Breakers List".)		And Then...Along Comes the Association
1966	"Cherish" b/w "Don't Blame It on Me" (titled "Don't Blame the Rain" on non-U.S. 45s)	Valiant 747	1	1	1	33	—	RIAA: Gold	And Then...Along Comes the Association
1966	"Pandora's Golden Heebie Jeebies" b/w "Standing Still" (from And Then...Along Comes the Association)	Valiant 755	35	26	27	—	—		Renaissance
1967	"No Fair at All"/ "Looking Glass"	Valiant 758	51; 113	53	—	—	—		Renaissance
1967	"Windy" b/w "Sometime"	Warner Bros. 7041	1	1	1	34	53	RIAA: Platinum	Insight Out
1967	"Never My Love"/ "Requiem for the Masses"	Warner Bros. 7074	2; 100	1	1	—	—	RIAA: Platinum	Insight Out
1968	"Everything That Touches You" b/w "We Love Us" (from Insight Out)	Warner Bros. 7163	10	11	6	—	—		Birthday
1968	"Time for Livin'" b/w "Birthday Morning"	Warner Bros. 7195	39	22	21	—	23		Birthday
1968	"Six Man Band" b/w "Like Always" (from Birthday)	Warner Bros. 7229	47	29	29	—	—		Greatest Hits
1969	"The Time It Is Today" b/w "Enter the Young" (from Greatest Hits, new version of a song originally from And Then...Along Comes the Association)	Warner Bros. 7239	—	—	—	—	—		Birthday
1969	"Goodbye, Columbus" b/w "The Time It Is Today" (from Birthday)	Warner Bros. 7267	80	78	68	—	—		Goodbye, Columbus soundtrack
1969	"Under Branches" b/w "Hear in Here" (from Birthday)	Warner Bros. 7277	117	—	—	—	—		The Association
1970	"Yes, I Will" b/w "I Am Up for Europe"	Warner Bros. 7305	120	—	—	—			The Association
1970	"Dubuque Blues" b/w "Are You Ready"	Warner Bros. 7349	—	84	76	—	—		The Association
1970	"Just About the Same" b/w "Look at Me, Look at You" (from The Association)	Warner Bros. 7372	106	91	81	—	—		Non-album track
1970	"Along the Way" b/w "Traveler's Guide"	Warner Bros. 7429	—	—	—	—	—		Stop Your Motor
1971	"P.F. Sloan" b/w "Traveler's Guide"	Warner Bros. 7471	—	—	—	—	—		Stop Your Motor
1971	"Bring Yourself Home" b/w "It's Gotta Be Real"	Warner Bros. 7515	—	—	—	—	—		Stop Your Motor
1971	"That's Racin'" b/w "Makes Me Cry" (alternate title for "Funny Kind of Song")	Warner Bros. 7524	—	—	—	—	—		Stop Your Motor
1972	"Darlin' Be Home Soon" b/w "Indian Wells Woman"	Columbia 45602	104	90	61	—	—		Waterbeds in Trinidad!
1972	"Come the Fall" b/w "Kicking the Gong Around"	Columbia 45654	—	—	—	—	—		Waterbeds in Trinidad!
1973	"Names, Tags, Numbers & Labels" b/w "Rainbows Bent" (from Waterbeds in Trinidad!)	Mums 6061	91	85	—	—	—		Non-album tracks
1975	"One Sunday Morning" b/w "Life Is a Carnival"	RCA 10217	—	—	—	—	—		Non-album tracks
1975	"Sleepy Eyes" b/w "Take Me to the Pilot"	RCA 10297	—	—	—	—	—		Non-album tracks
1981	"Dreamer" b/w "You Turn the Light On"	Elektra 47094	66	—	—	—	—		Non-album tracks
1981	"Small Town Lovers" b/w "Across the Persian Gulf"	Elektra 47146	—	—	—	—	—		Non-album tracks
