= Windy (song) =

- West German picture sleeve

Single by the Association

from the album Insight Out
- B-side: "Sometime"
- Released: May 1, 1967
- Recorded: March 28, April 11 and 13, 1967
- Genre: Psychedelic pop; sunshine pop
- Length: 2:53
- Label: Warner Bros.
- Songwriter: Ruthann Friedman
- Producer: Bones Howe

The Association singles chronology
"No Fair at All" (1967)	"Windy" (1967)	"Never My Love" (1967)

Audio sample
- file; help

"Windy" is a pop song written by Ruthann Friedman and recorded by the Association. The song reached No. 1 on the Billboard Hot 100 in July 1967, becoming the group's second U.S. No. 1 hit following "Cherish" in 1966. Billboard ranked the record as the No. 4 song for 1967.

The lead vocals were sung primarily by guitarist and new band member Larry Ramos along with vocalist Russ Giguere (both would sing lead together in the band's last Top 40 hit "Time for Livin'"). Ramos, who was of Filipino descent, was one of the few Asian-American lead singers at the time to have a number one hit single.

== Composition ==
Friedman was introduced to the Association by her friend and Beach Boys lyricist Van Dyke Parks. She wrote "Windy" in waltz time, but the group's producer Bones Howe changed it to the more common 4/4 to ensure the song's commercial appeal. (Note: Similar to "Cherish", in that its producer Curt Boettcher sped the tempo of the song to be played on AM radio)

Friedman had written the song about a man but the Association changed the gender in the lyrics. In an interview with Songfacts, she said:

I have heard so many different permutations of what the song was about. Here is the TRUTH. I was sitting on my bed – the apartment on the first floor of David Crosby’s house in Beverly Glenn [sic] – and there was a fellow who came to visit and was sitting there staring at me as if he was going to suck the life out of me. So I started to fantasize about what kind of a guy I would like to be with, and that was Windy – a guy (fantasy).

However, in another interview with Songfacts in 2014, she explained that the song was about herself:

These days, looking back at myself in my mid to late 20s, I finally realized I was talking about me in that song, and how I wanted to be.

A demo of the song, recorded by Ruthann Friedman appears on her album, Windy: A Ruthann Friedman Songbook.

== Recording ==
The process of recording the vocals was exhausting. The session started in the early afternoon and ended at 6:30 a.m. the next day, and the group then took an 8:30 a.m. flight to a live performance in Virginia. The band was so tired of recording that producer Bones Howe gathered everyone in the studio to sing the track's ending, including songwriter Ruthann Friedman.

Because of the poor sales of the Association's last album Renaissance, on which the group performed all of the songs, Howe recruited session musicians (later known as the Wrecking Crew) for "Windy" and the rest of the Insight Out album in order to achieve a radio-friendly sound. The identity of the musicians who played on the final version of the single is uncertain because the song was recorded during several sessions.

== Personnel ==
According to the AFM contract sheet, the following session musicians appeared on the track.

- Ray Pohlman
- Hal Blaine
- Dennis Budimir
- Al Casey
- Mike Deasy
- Bones Howe
- Larry Knechtel
- Joe Osborn
- Gary Coleman
- Bill Holman
- Bud Shank
- Gene Cipriano
- Vincent DeRosa
- Richard Perissi

== Chart history ==
=== Weekly charts ===
Chart (1967)	Peak position
Australia (Go-Set)	35
Canada RPM Top Singles	1
New Zealand (Listener)	6
South Africa (Springbok)	14
U.S. Billboard Hot 100	1
U.S. Cash Box Top 100	1
US Record World Singles Chart	1

=== Year-end charts ===
Chart (1967)	Rank
Canada	11
U.S. Billboard Hot 100	4
U.S. Cash Box	7

=== All-time charts ===
Chart (1958–2018)	Position
US Billboard Hot 100	393

== Notable cover versions ==
- Later in 1967, an instrumental version by jazz guitarist Wes Montgomery became his highest-charting Hot 100 hit when it peaked at No. 44. It also reached No. 10 on the Billboard Easy Listening chart. Andy Williams also recorded the song.

== See also ==
- List of recordings of songs featuring Hal Blaine
