= Along Comes Mary =

1966 single by the Association

Single by the Association

from the album And Then... Along Comes the Association
- B-side: "Your Own Love"
- Released: March 1966
- Genre: Folk rock; soft rock; sunshine pop; baroque pop
- Length: 2:45
- Label: Valiant
- Songwriter: Tandyn Almer
- Producer: Curt Boettcher

The Association singles chronology
"One Too Many Mornings" (1965)	"Along Comes Mary" (1966)	"Cherish" (1966)

"Along Comes Mary" is a song composed by Tandyn Almer, originally recorded by American sunshine pop band the Association. It was the group's first hit, released in March 1966 as the lead single prior to their debut album, And Then... Along Comes the Association, which appeared in July.

== Background ==
"Along Comes Mary" is sung from the point of view of a once-disillusioned young man talking about the "tribulations no one ever sees" and who "curse[s] those faults in me." The singer believes Mary gives him comfort and improves his life. Both Leonard Bernstein and Tandyn Almer stated that Mary was a reference to marijuana; this association was also prevalent among many of the song's listeners. In the Young People's Concert titled What Is a Mode? Leonard Bernstein explained that the song was composed in the Dorian mode.

== Charts ==
Chart (1966)	Peak position
CAN RPM	8
US Billboard Hot 100	7
US Cashbox Top 100	9
US Record World Singles Chart	10

== Bloodhound Gang version ==
"Along Comes Mary"

Single by Bloodhound Gang

from the album Hooray for Boobies
- B-side: "I Wish I Was Queer So I Could Get Chicks"; "Fire Water Burn"
- Released: May 24, 1999
- Recorded: 1997
- Genre: Hard rock; pop-punk
- Length: 3:20
- Label: Jimmy Franks; Geffen
- Composer: Jimmy Pop
- Lyricist: Tandyn Almer
- Producer: Jimmy Pop

Bloodhound Gang singles chronology
"Why's Everybody Always Pickin' on Me?" (1997)	"Along Comes Mary" (1999)	"The Bad Touch" (1999)

Music video
- "Along Comes Mary" on YouTube

American rock band Bloodhound Gang recorded a version of "Along Comes Mary" with new punk music to accompany the lyrics. It first appeared on the soundtrack to the film Half Baked in January 1998 before appearing on Bloodhound Gang's third studio album, Hooray for Boobies, the following year. "Along Comes Mary" was released as the album's first single in May 1999 and reached No. 5 in Austria, No. 6 in Germany, and No. 13 in Switzerland. The song was certified gold in both Austria and Germany.

=== Charts ===
==== Weekly charts ====
Chart (1999)	Peak position
Austria (Ö3 Austria Top 40)	5
Europe (Eurochart Hot 100)	22
Germany (GfK)	6
Switzerland (Schweizer Hitparade)	13

==== Year-end charts ====
Chart (1999)	Position
Austria (Ö3 Austria Top 40)	27
Germany (Media Control)	23

=== Certifications ===
Region	Certification	Certified units/sales
Austria (IFPI Austria)	Gold	25,000^{*}
Germany (BVMI)	Gold	250,000^{^}
^{*} Sales figures based on certification alone.^{^} Shipments figures based on certification alone.

== Other covers ==
In 1966, Hugh Masekela included the song on his album Hugh Masekela's Next Album, and in 1967, Cal Tjader covered it for his album Along Comes Cal. That same year, Baja Marimba Band's had a minor hit with their cover of the song. In 1968, George Benson included a version on his album Giblet Gravy, and in 1986 a cover appeared on R. Stevie Moore's album Glad Music.

In 1995, the Manhattan Transfer covered the song for their album Tonin', and the following year, 24-7 Spyz covered it for their album 6. In 2005, a cover of the song appeared on the Guess Who's compilation album Let's Go, and Plainsong also released a cover on their self-titled album.

== See also ==
- List of recordings of songs Hal Blaine has played on
