= Terry Kirkman =

American singer (1939–2023)

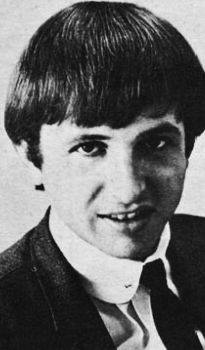
- Kirkman in 1966

Background information
- Born: Terry Robert Kirkman; December 12, 1939; Salina, Kansas, U.S.
- Origin: Los Angeles, California, U.S.
- Died: September 23, 2023 (aged 83) Montclair, California, U.S.
- Genres: Folk rock; sunshine pop
- Occupations: Singer; songwriter; musician
- Instruments: Vocals; flugelhorn; percussion; recorder; keyboards; harmonica; saxophone; clarinet; flute
- Years active: 1964–1984; 2019
- Formerly of: The Association

Terry Robert Kirkman (December 12, 1939 – September 23, 2023) was an American singer, songwriter, and musician best known as a vocalist and multi-instrumentalist for the pop group the Association. He composed several of the band's hit songs, including "Cherish", "Everything That Touches You", and "Six Man Band". As a member of the Association, he was inducted into the Vocal Group Hall of Fame in 2003.

== Early life ==
Terry Robert Kirkman was born in Salina, Kansas, on December 12, 1939, and was raised in Chino, California. His parents both had a musical background. His father Gordon had performed in bands as a soprano saxophone player and singer, and his mother Lois played the organ and piano at church and in silent film theaters. He first learned how to play brass instruments as a child, during the Second World War. After graduating from Chino High School in 1957, he attended Chaffey College as a music major. He met Frank Zappa in college and they performed together at local coffeehouses from 1959 to 1961.

== The Association ==
As a salesman visiting Hawaii in 1962, Kirkman met Jules Alexander, who was in the United States Navy at the time, and the two resolved to meet when Alexander would be discharged from his military duties.

Kirkman moved to Los Angeles with Alexander in 1963. Kirkman and Alexander founded the folk group the Inner Tubes, which at one time included both Cass Elliot and David Crosby. The Inner Tubes slowly grew from a small group into a 13-piece band called the Men.

The Men disbanded in February 1965 and Kirkman and five other members formed their own band. To find a new name, they perused a dictionary and chose "the Association" after it was suggested by Kirkman's fiancée. The Association quickly gained fame with their songs "Cherish" and "Along Comes Mary" from their 1966 debut album And Then... Along Comes the Association.

In 1966, a collection of poems penned by the six members of the Association was released as the book Crank Your Spreaders, this was reprinted in August 1969.

Kirkman contributed vocals to many songs, including "Never My Love", "Cherish", and "Everything That Touches You". He performed with the group at the Monterey Pop Festival in 1967. His "Requiem for the Masses", a song written about the war in Vietnam, featured requiem-style vocals.

The Association were nominated for a Grammy Award six times, three times each in the 9th (1967) and 10th Annual Grammy Awards (1968).

Kirkman left the Association at the end of 1972, and returned when the band was reformed in 1979, after previously splitting up the year before. After growing tired of touring, Kirkman left the band in 1984. Subsequently, on rare occasions he performed in guest appearances with the band. He was present when he and the Association's other surviving members were inducted into the Vocal Group Hall of Fame in 2003 and when the band were recipients of the Rock Justice Awards on January 19, 2019, at The Village in Los Angeles.

A series of interviews in which he and Jules Alexander took part, in early 2023, were released in separate parts, starting on September 1, 2023. The fourth part of these interviews was released a day before his death.

== Personal life and death ==
In the years following his departure from the Association, Kirkman retired from the music industry and worked in California as an addiction counselor.

Kirkman lived in Montclair, California, with his wife Heidi. He died from congestive heart failure on September 23, 2023, at age 83, following a long illness.

== Discography ==
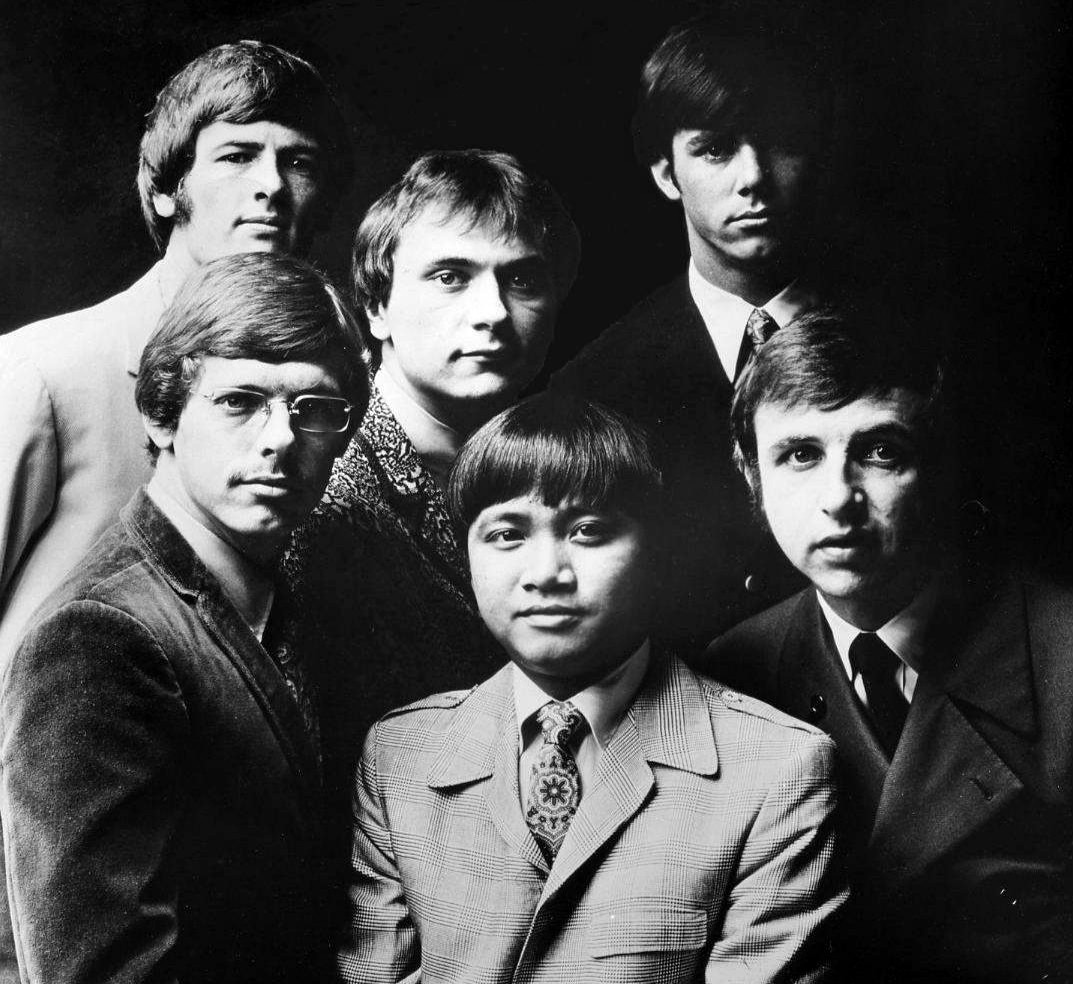
Terry Kirkman (bottom right) with The Association in 1968.

=== Albums ===
Title	Year
And Then... Along Comes the Association	1966
Renaissance	1966
Insight Out	1967
Birthday	1968
The Association	1969
Stop Your Motor	1971
Waterbeds in Trinidad!	1972

== Nominations ==
As a member of the Association, he was nominated for a Grammy Award six times, three times each in the 9th and 10th Annual Grammy Awards:

=== 9th Annual Grammy Awards (1967) ===
Category	Song	Note
Best Contemporary Group Performance	Cherish	
Best Contemporary Recording	Cherish	
Best Performance By A Vocal Group	Cherish	

=== 10th Annual Grammy Awards (1968) ===
Category	Song/Album	Note
Best Contemporary Group Performance	Windy	
Best Contemporary Album	Insight Out	
Best Performance By A Vocal Group	Never My Love	
