= Addrisi Brothers =

American pop vocal duo

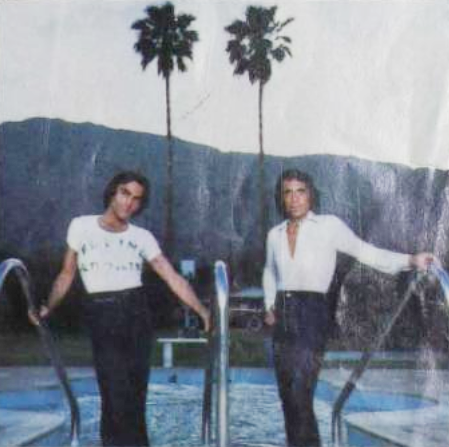
- The Addrisi Brothers in 1977

Background information
- Origin: Winthrop, Massachusetts, US
- Genre: Pop
- Years active: 1950s–1984
- Past members: Donald Addrisi; Richard Addrisi

The Addrisi Brothers were an American pop duo from Winthrop, Massachusetts. The brothers themselves were Donald Addrisi (December 14, 1938 – November 13, 1984) and Richard Addrisi (July 4, 1941 – October 14, 2025).

== Biography ==
Both Don and Dick played parts in their family's acrobatic group, the Flying Addrisis. In the 1950s, they got in touch with Lenny Bruce about starting a singing career and moved to California. They auditioned for parts on the Mickey Mouse Club, but were rejected. Soon after, however, they signed to Del-Fi Records and recorded several singles. Aside from the modest chart hit "Cherrystone" (1959), these were not successes. Further releases from Imperial Records and Warner Bros. Records fared no better, so the pair began working more as songwriters.

The Addrisi Brothers' biggest success as a songwriting duo was "Never My Love", a hit for the Association; the brothers themselves had a hit with it in 1977. They also charted several more hit singles in the 1970s and composed the theme music for the television program Nanny and the Professor. In 1977, they secured their biggest chart hit with "Slow Dancin' Don't Turn Me On", released on Buddah Records. They worked together until Don Addrisi died from pancreatic cancer on November 13, 1984, at the age of 45. His ashes were interred, along with his parents, at Forest Lawn Memorial Park. Dick Addrisi died on October 14, 2025, at the age of 84.

== Discography ==
=== Albums ===
- We've Got to Get It On Again (Columbia Records, 1972) U.S. No. 137
- Addrisi Brothers (Buddah Records, 1977) U.S. No. 118
- Ghost Dancer (Scotti Brothers Records / Atlantic Records, 1979)
- Never My Love - The Lost Album Sessions (Varèse Sarabande)

=== Singles ===
- "Everybody Happy" b/w "I'll Be True" (1958) Brad Label
- "Cherrystone" (6/1959) U.S. No. 62
- "Saving My Kisses" (1959)
- "Back to the Old Salt Mine" b/w "It's Love" (1959)
- "Gonna See My Baby" (1959)
- "What a Night for Love" (1960)
- "The Dance Is Over" (1962)
- "Love Me Baby" (1964)
- "Little Miss Sad" (1964)
- "Side by Side" (1965)
- "Excuse Me" (Dick Addrisi, 1966)
- "Never My Love" (12/1967) U.S. No. 80 AC No. 28
- "Time to Love" (1968)
- "We've Got to Get It On Again" b/w "You Make It All Worthwhile" (1/1972) U.S. No. 25, AC No. 10; Canada No. 15, AC No. 32
- "I Can Feel You" (5/1972) U.S. No. 110
- "I Can Count on You" (1972)
- "Somebody Found Her (Before I Lost Her)" (2/1974) U.S. AC No. 42
- ”Wait for Me (Busted Bad)” (1975)
- "Slow Dancin' Don't Turn Me On" (4/1977) U.S. No. 20, AC No. 34; Canada No. 34, AC No. 49
- "Does She Do It Like She Dances" (9/1977) U.S. No. 74
- "Ghost Dancer" (8/1979) U.S. No. 45, AC No. 41; CAN AC No. 43; UK No. 57
- "As Long as the Music Keeps Playing" (1979) (12" Promo)
- "Red Eye Flight (You Can Always Come Home Again)" (1981)
