= Cherish (The Association song) =

1966 single by the Association

Single by the Association

from the album And Then... Along Comes the Association
- B-side: "Don't Blame It on Me"
- Released: August 1966
- Genre: Pop; soft rock
- Length: 3:25 (album); 3:13 (single)
- Label: Valiant
- Songwriter: Terry Kirkman
- Producer: Curt Boettcher

The Association singles chronology
"Along Comes Mary" (1966)	"Cherish" (1966)	"Pandora's Golden Heebie Jeebies" (1966)

"Cherish" is a pop song written by Terry Kirkman and recorded by the Association. Released in 1966, the song reached number one on the US Billboard Hot 100 in September of that year and remained in the top position for three weeks. Billboard ranked the record as the No. 7 song of 1966, and later as No. 2, after a revision of the year-end charts. It was certified gold by the RIAA in the US in 1966. In Canada, the song also reached number one.

== Original version ==
=== Songwriting ===
Terry Kirkman wrote it in half an hour at his parents' home in Chino, California. He wrote the lyrics around the word "Cherish" because Kirkman had heard someone earlier that evening use it. He thought the word would be a good song title and lyric, "Cherish is the word," because the expression resonated with a tender, loving tone and was incorporated into the live act of his group, the Association. He was looking for an emotional, slow tempo song in the same vein as the Righteous Brothers' "You've Lost That Lovin' Feelin'". Mike Whelan, from the New Christy Minstrels, liked it so much that he convinced the Minstrels to record a version of the song, and in fact their recording was almost released before the Association's.

"Cherish" is a song of unrequited love. In the lyrics, the protagonist sings to his love object of "all the feeling that I have hiding here for you inside," but confesses "I'm beginning to think that man has never found the words that could make you want me." One interpretation of the song is that it has a "stalker" quality, because of the singer's desperation and such lyrics as "You don't know how many times I wish that I could mold you into someone who could cherish me as much as I cherish you."

=== Recording ===
The instrumentation of their debut, which includes this song, was recorded at a converted garage studio owned by Gary S. Paxton, who engineered the sessions along with Pete Romano, while the vocals of the group were recorded at Columbia studios. Like most of Association hits, session musicians were called to do the instrumental track, including Mike Deasy on guitar, Jerry Scheff on bass and Jim Troxel on drums, with only Kirkman and Jules Alexander, as members of the band, participating on it. Curt Boettcher added some vocals, including the high-pitched "told you" and "hold you" on the final verse.

The song is notable for having two bridge sections, the second leading to a modulation in which the key rises a whole step. The song ends with the words "cherish is the word," over a sustained vibrato electric guitar chord. The song is noted for its use of chimes, which are simultaneously imitated by the backing vocalists.

For the single released, the song was sped up and one of the two "And I do cherish you" lines near the end was removed. This was done to hold the track to the three-minute mark, as AM radio programmers frowned on songs that went longer than that. However, even with the edit, the song still ran over. Instead of editing further, producer Curt Boettcher intentionally listed "3:00" on the label as the song's running time.

=== Critical reception ===
In a retrospective review published on Stereogum in 2018, Tom Breihan wrote, "There are things about 'Cherish' that should be good – things that look nice on paper. The Association were singing in lush, Beach Boys–esque harmonies, and they were doing it over intricately layered guitars and banjos and horns. But 'Cherish' is a bloodless affair, a sickly-sweet melody backing up a somewhat creepy lyric about fixating too hard on a girl." In his conclusion, he wrote, "Songs like this – vaguely queasy pop songs with lush and lightly orchestral arrangements – would pretty much dominate pop music for a few years in the early ’70s. The Association got there first, but they don't get any points for it."

Conversely, Terry Watada states, "Cherish was wonderful, its sensual harmonies and simple sentiments produced the ideal dreamy atmosphere for a last dance." In the 2004 edition of The Rolling Stone Album Guide writer Paul Evans, while critical of the band and its work as a whole, acknowledged the song "tingles as a makeout classic".

=== Aftermath ===
In 2012, original Association member Jim Yester said the record label claimed the song sounded "too old and archaic", but quipped that the song's success "just showed we can have archaic and eat it, too."

=== Personnel ===
==== The Association ====
- Terry Kirkman – lead vocals
- Russ Giguere – harmony vocals
- Jules Alexander – backing vocals; possible lead guitar
- Jim Yester – backing vocals
- Brian Cole – backing vocals
- Ted Bluechel – backing vocals

==== Session musicians and production staff ====
- Mike Deasy, Lee Mallory, Ben Benay – guitars
- Jerry Scheff – bass guitar
- Doug Rhodes or Butch Parker – celesta
- Jim Henderson – piano
- Toxey French – vibraphone
- Jim Troxel – drums
- Curt Boettcher – backing vocals; producer
- Gary S. Paxton, Pete Romano – engineers

- Uncredited: chimes

=== Charts ===
Chart (1966)	Peak position
Canada Top Singles (RPM)	1
New Zealand (Listener)	20
US Billboard Hot 100	1
US Adult Contemporary (Billboard)	38

== David Cassidy version ==
"Cherish"

Single by David Cassidy

from the album Cherish
- B-side: "All I Wanna Do Is Touch You"
- Released: October 1971
- Genre: Pop
- Length: 3:48 (single); 3:46 (album)
- Label: Bell
- Songwriter: Terry Kirkman
- Producer: Wes Farrell

David Cassidy singles chronology
"Cherish" (1971)	"Could It Be Forever" (1971)

David Cassidy recorded his own version as a single in October 1971, which later appeared on his album Cherish (1972). His version ended on the repeated phrase in the coda: "And I do cherish you", which fades out. His version reached number nine on the Hot 100 chart, and spent one week at number one on the Adult Contemporary chart. It also peaked at number three in Canada and reached number one in both Australia and New Zealand.

In the UK, it was issued as a double A-side with "Could It Be Forever", and peaked at number 2 in the UK Singles Chart. It was his debut hit single in that country. The song was certified gold by the RIAA in the US in December 1971. Critics called his version a "top redoing of the Association's early smash."

=== Charts ===
Chart (1971–72)	Peak position
Australia (Go-Set National Top 40)	2
Australia (Kent Music Report Top 100)	1
Canada Top Singles (RPM)	3
Canada Adult Contemporary (RPM)	8
New Zealand (Listener Chart)	5
UK Singles (Official Charts)	2
US Billboard Hot 100	9
US Adult Contemporary (Billboard)	1

== See also ==
- List of number-one singles of 1966 (Canada)
- List of Billboard Hot 100 number ones of 1966
- List of Billboard Easy Listening number ones of 1972
