= Ray Pohlman =

American musician (1930–1990)

- Born: Merlyn Ray Pohlman; July 22, 1930; Baker Township, Iowa, U.S.
- Died: November 1, 1990 (aged 60) California, U.S.
- Occupation: Musician
- Instruments: Bass guitar, guitar
- Formerly of: The Wrecking Crew

Merlyn Ray Pohlman (July 22, 1930 – November 1, 1990) was an American session musician and arranger who played both upright bass and bass guitar, and also did sessions as a guitarist. He is credited with being the first electric bass player in Los Angeles studios in the 1950s.

== Biography ==
Pohlman was a first-call member of The Wrecking Crew, who recorded with Phil Spector and The Beach Boys. He was the musical director of the house band, "The Shindogs", on the 1960s television show Shindig!

His bass guitar playing is credited on hundreds of tracks including The Beach Boys' "Good Vibrations". Pohlman died of heart failure at the age of 60.

== Artists with whom Pohlman recorded ==
Per AllMusic.

- Richie Allen
- Ann-Margret
- The Association
- Chet Baker
- The Beach Boys
- Pat Boone
- Tim Buckley
- Glen Campbell
- Leonard Cohen
- Sam Cooke
- Doris Day
- Dion
- Duane Eddy
- The Everly Brothers
- The 5th Dimension
- The Four Preps
- Merle Haggard
- Emmylou Harris
- Lee Hazlewood
- The Hondells
- Jan & Dean
- Gary Lewis & the Playboys
- Donna Loren
- The Marketts
- Bette Midler
- The Monkees
- Mystic Moods Orchestra
- Ricky Nelson
- Willie Nelson
- Laura Nyro
- Fess Parker
- Paul Revere & the Raiders
- The Rip Chords
- The Ronettes
- Del Shannon
- T.G. Sheppard
- Mel Tormé
- The Turtles
- Ian Whitcomb

== Discography ==
=== As sideman ===
With The Beach Boys

- Shut Down Volume 2 (1964)
- “Fun, Fun, Fun” (1964)
- All Summer Long (1964)
- “I Get Around”
- “Little Honda”
- “Don’t Back Down”
- Help Me, Ronda
- Dance Dance Dance
- I Know There's an Answer
- I Just Wasn't Made for These Times
- Here Today
- Please Let Me Wonder
- God Only Knows
- Good Vibrations

With Sam Cooke

- Bring It On Home to Me
- Good Times
- Having a Party

With The Ronettes

- Be My Baby
- Baby, I Love You
