= The Lovin' Spoonful Greatest Hits =

Compilation album by the Lovin' Spoonful
- Released: February 22, 2000
- Recorded: 1965–1968
- Genre: Folk rock
- Length: 67:28
- Label: Buddha
- Producer: Erik Jacobsen; Jack Lewis; The Lovin' Spoonful; Joe Wissert; Chip Douglas

The Lovin' Spoonful chronology
Live at the Hotel Seville (1999)	The Lovin' Spoonful Greatest Hits (2000)

The Lovin' Spoonful Greatest Hits is a compilation album by the folk-rock band the Lovin' Spoonful. Released in 2000 on Buddha Records, the compilation marked the first digital remaster of the band's material taken from the original multi-track master tapes, which had been rediscovered after having been lost for decades. The album contains every Top 40 hit single enjoyed by the band in the United States including its only chart-topper, "Summer in the City." The original recordings were produced by Erik Jacobsen, and originally released on Kama Sutra Records.

== Release and reception ==
Professional ratings
Review scores
Source	Rating
AllMusic	5/5 stars
MSN Music (Consumer Guide)	A−

After the Lovin' Spoonful's dissolution in 1968, many of the band's original multi-track master tapes were lost. The band's earliest CD reissues were instead made from the best available stereo masters, leaving the material sounding substandard when compared to reissues of other 1960s music. After rediscovering the first-generation master-tapes, Buddha Records issued Greatest Hits as the first digital remaster of the band's material.

Greatest Hits was released on February 22, 2000. The compilation features 26 tracks, including the Lovin' Spoonful's first seven singles, all of which reached the U.S. Top Ten upon initial release. In his review of the album for AllMusic, Hal Horowitz described its sound as possessing "a crispness and definition previously unheard", and he counted it as the band's most essential one-disc compilation. The critic Robert Christgau described it as a slight improvement on the band's 1990 compilation Anthology, and he added that there are only a few weak tracks in the selection which "slow down its historical mission of evoking the balmy upsurge to the Summer of Love like no other body of music".

== Track listing ==
All tracks are written by John Sebastian and produced by Erik Jacobsen, except as noted.

No.	Title	Writer(s)	Producer(s)	Length
1.	"Do You Believe in Magic"			2:07
2.	"You Didn't Have to Be So Nice"	J. Sebastian, Steve Boone		2:29
3.	"Daydream"			2:21
4.	"You Baby"	Barry Mann, Phil Spector, Cynthia Weil		2:56
5.	"Did You Ever Have to Make Up Your Mind?"			1:59
6.	"Wild About My Lovin'"	traditional		2:36
7.	"Younger Girl"			2:20
8.	"On the Road Again"			1:51
9.	"Didn't Want to Have to Do It"			2:36
10.	"Jug Band Music"			2:53
11.	"Summer in the City"	J. Sebastian, Mark Sebastian, Steve Boone		2:45
12.	"Rain on the Roof"			2:13
13.	"Pow! (Theme from What's Up, Tiger Lily?)"	J. Sebastian, Skip Boone, Steve Boone, Joe Butler, Zal Yanovsky	Jack Lewis	2:26
14.	"Nashville Cats"			2:35
15.	"Lovin' You"			2:29
16.	"Darlin' Companion"			2:22
17.	"Coconut Grove"	J. Sebastian, Yanovsky		2:43
18.	"Full Measure"	J. Sebastian, Steve Boone		2:42
19.	"Darling Be Home Soon"			3:34
20.	"Lonely (Amy's Theme)"			3:20
21.	"You're a Big Boy Now"			2:32
22.	"Six O'Clock"		The Lovin' Spoonful and Joe Wissert	2:43
23.	"She Is Still a Mystery"		The Lovin' Spoonful and Wissert	3:01
24.	"Money"		The Lovin' Spoonful and Wissert	1:55
25.	"Younger Generation"		The Lovin' Spoonful and Wissert	2:42
26.	"Never Going Back"	John Stewart	Chip Douglas	2:48
Total length:				67:28
