= Do You Believe in Magic (album) =

Studio album by the Lovin' Spoonful
- Released: October 23, 1965
- Recorded: June–September 1965
- Studio: Bell Sound, New York City; RCA, Hollywood
- Genre: Folk rock; rock; pop
- Length: 30:03
- Label: Kama Sutra (US); Pye International (UK)
- Producer: Erik Jacobsen

The Lovin' Spoonful chronology
Do You Believe in Magic (1965)	Daydream (1966)

Singles from Do You Believe in Magic
- 1. "Do You Believe in Magic" / "On the Road Again" Released: July 20, 1965; 2. "Did You Ever Have to Make Up Your Mind?" Released: April 1966 (Note: Before "Did You Ever Have to Make Up Your Mind"'s US release in April 1966, Quality Records issued it in December 1965 in select Canadian cities to test its potential performance in the American market.)

Do You Believe in Magic is the debut studio album by the Canadian-American folk-rock band the Lovin' Spoonful. It was released in the United States on October 23, 1965, on the Kama Sutra label. Release in the United Kingdom followed in March 1966. The album features the hits "Do You Believe in Magic" (US No. 9) and "Did You Ever Have to Make Up Your Mind?" (US No. 2).

Do You Believe in Magic was re-released on CD in 2002 with five bonus tracks.

== Background ==
In the early 1960s, John Sebastian and Zal Yanovsky were active in the folk-music scene in Greenwich Village, a neighborhood of New York City. The two first met on February 9, 1964, at a party held to watch the English rock band the Beatles make their American television debut on The Ed Sullivan Show. Both of them were greatly influenced by the Beatles' performance; Sebastian later recalled that they "were both aware of the fact that this commercial folk music model was about to change again, that the four-man band that actually played their own instruments and wrote their own songs was the thing."

By 1964, Sebastian and Yanovsky were members of an early rock group, the Mugwumps. After it dissolved late in that year, they began planning to form their own group, which they envisioned as an electric jug band. In early 1965, they recruited the local rock musicians Steve Boone and Joe Butler to play bass guitar and drums, respectively.

== Recording and production ==
=== Recording history ===
The earliest recordings on Do You Believe in Magic date to June 1965, when the producer Erik Jacobsen fronted a session for the Lovin' Spoonful with his own money at Bell Sound Studios in New York City. The band recorded several songs during the session, including "Do You Believe in Magic". (Note: Which other songs were recorded is disputed. Boone and the journalist Ben Edmonds each write it was "Wild About My Lovin'" and an electric arrangement "Younger Girl", but Jacobsen remembered it only included "On the Road Again".) Among those invited to participate were the local folk musician Jerry Yester, who added both piano and backing vocals, the session musician Gary Chester, who played tambourine, and the arranger Alan Lorber, who assisted with the vocal arrangement. Harry Yarmark engineered the session.

Jacobsen and Bob Cavallo, the band's manager, brought an acetate disc of the session to numerous record labels, most of which turned down an opportunity to sign the Spoonful. Later in June, the band signed with Koppelman-Rubin, an entertainment company, who signed them to Kama Sutra Records. The label saw no need to re-record "Do You Believe in Magic", and they pressed copies of the June recording to be the band's debut single. It was issued in the US on July 20, 1965, backed with "On the Road Again", and it remained on the Billboard Hot 100 chart for thirteen weeks, peaking in October at number nine.

The release of "Do You Believe in Magic" propelled the Spoonful to nationwide fame in the US within weeks. Amid a busy touring schedule, the band were forced to work to a tight deadline to ensure the album was completed as quickly as possible. To ensure expediency, they opted to record several well-rehearsed covers from their typical live set list. The band recorded ten tracks in July and August at Bell Sound in New York. In August, while they were in Hollywood, Los Angeles, playing at clubs on the Sunset Strip, the band quickly booked an additional session at RCA Studios to re-record their instrumental "Night Owl Blues". Sessions for the album concluded with "Did You Ever Have to Make Up Your Mind?", recorded in September.

=== Techniques and instrumentation ===
"Do You Believe in Magic" was recorded on two-track recording equipment, which Jacobsen mixed down to mono, and the rest of the album was recorded on three-track equipment. The band's normal workflow involved recording the backing track before overdubbing vocals and extra guitar contributions from Yanovsky. Sebastian, Yanovsky and Butler typically sang the backing vocals together, which they sometimes double tracked.

The Spoonful were among the first rock bands to use the autoharp, a stringed instrument mostly associated with folk music which would feature often in the band's recordings. The instrument includes buttons which, when depressed, produce preset combinations of chords. Its limitations meant it was typically used as a rhythm instrument, but Sebastian retuned his so he could play the minor seventh chords in the intro of "Do You Believe in Magic". In the rehearsal room before the band's first session, he also developed a new technique of amplifying the instrument, which involved affixing a ukulele contact microphone onto its back and then plugging it into an amplifier. To generate more bottom end, the band overdubbed piano underneath, which Sebastian later said "create[d] the effect of a huge autoharp".

Yanovsky's principal guitar on the album was a Guild Thunderbird, a single-coil electric guitar which he bought from Manny's Music in Midtown Manhattan in 1964. Soon after recording "Do You Believe in Magic", he replaced the guitar's original Guild pickups with humbuckers, which he later said "weren't quite as warm the originals, but they aged nicely". He favored the guitar's "twangy" sound, which he thought resembled a pedal steel guitar. Sebastian later compared Yanovsky's playing style to the pianist Floyd Cramer – particularly his use of inversions – and he named Huey "Piano" Smith as another of Yanovsky's major influences. On "Did You Ever Have to Make Up Your Mind?", the pair sought to further evoke the style of Smith and his piano by simultaneously fingerpicking on their guitars.

== Songs ==
In his summary treatment of folk rock for The Rolling Stone Illustrated History of Rock & Roll, Paul Nelson characterized the Spoonful as archetypal of the genre, and he counted Do You Believe in Magic as among the earliest folk rock albums. Sebastian wrote all five of the album's original compositions. Some of his songs were heavily indebted to the jug band style, such as "On the Road" again, which derived from a song by the Memphis Jug Band, and "Younger Girl", which reworked the melody of the 1930 song "Prison Wall Blues" by Gus Cannon's Jug Stompers. "Do You Believe in Magic" blended influences from jug band and folk music with popular music, like the British Invasion and Motown. In contrast to other folk-rock acts, the Spoonful generally avoided "message songs" and protest music, a choice Sebastian ascribed to the band's lack of familiarity with politics.

We're the group that cries out not to be labeled. I think that if you've heard our [first] album, you know that we make a lot of different sounds, so that no one specific sound could really be characterized as what we "sound like." ... [T]he sound of the group is not singular but multiple.

— John Sebastian, c. December 1965

The Spoonful often sought to avoid being typecast by their music; Sebastian suggested at the time of the album's release that it showcased how the band was not defined by any specific sound. The various artists covered on the album are the Jim Kweskin Jug Band ("My Gal" and "Wild About My Lovin'"), the folk musician Fred Neil ("The Other Side of This Life"), the folk group the Holy Modal Rounders ("Blues in the Bottle"), the blues musician Henry Thomas ("Fishin' Blues") and the girl group the Ronettes ("You Baby"). Sebastian later said that the Kweskin Jug Band was particularly influential on the Spoonful, and that they "redid several of their tunes with only a minimal electric difference". (Note: Kweskin's 1963 debut album included "My Gal" and "Wild About My Loving", and the original liner notes of Do You Believe in Magic credited Kweskin in part for the arrangement of "My Gal".)

The Spoonful's management was mindful of the success of groups with multiple vocalists, like the Beatles and the Byrds, and they encouraged the band to trade lead vocal responsibilities; on Do You Believe in Magic, Sebastian sang lead on most songs, but the drummer Joe Butler also sang twice ("You Baby" and "The Other Side of This Life") as did Yanovsky ("Blues in the Bottle", "On the Road Again" and an unreleased track, "Alley Oop"). The album closed on an instrumental number, "Night Owl Blues", the title of which referenced a club in Greenwich Village, New York City, where the Spoonful developed their sound in early 1965.

== Release and commercial performance ==
Do You Believe in Magic's release was preceded by the Spoonful's second tour of the US West Coast, which began on October 18, 1965. The tour coincided with the peak of "Do You Believe in Magic" on the Billboard singles chart, and it represented a high point for the band's members, who felt they had been better received in California than anywhere else. The album first went on-sale on October 23, when the band held an autograph session in San Francisco's East Bay area after a week of appearances at the city's hungry i club. Kama Sutra Records issued the album across the United States in November. In conjunction with the release, the label issued the non-album single "You Didn't Have to Be So Nice", which had been recorded too late for inclusion on the album. (Note: "You Didn't Have to Be So Nice" was later included on the Lovin' Spoonful's second album, Daydream, issued in February 1966.)

Presales for the album were strong, reaching around 60,000 orders by late October 1965, and Billboard magazine's review panel predicted the album would match the success of the "Do You Believe in Magic" single. The album entered Billboard's Top LPs chart on December 4, and it initially ran on the chart for 19 weeks. It first peaked in February 1966 at number 71. In April, after the album fell off the US charts, Kama Sutra issued "Did You Ever Have to Make Up Your Mind?" as a single. That same month, another American rock band signed to the label, the Critters, released a cover of "Younger Girl" as their debut single. The singles peaked at numbers two and 42, respectively, and Do You Believe in Magic re-entered the Top LPs chart in June. The album spent 16 more weeks on the chart; it peaked at number 32 in August, a week before the band's fifth single, "Summer in the City", topped the singles chart.

Do You Believe in Magic was first released in the United Kingdom in March 1966. The album was distributed by Pye International Records, which negotiated the UK release rights for Kama Sutra products in late 1965. Released before the band broke-out in the UK with an April 1966 tour, the album did not chart, but an EP collecting "Did You Ever Have to Make Up Your Mind?" and three other album tracks reached number three on Record Mirror's EP chart that July.

== Critical reception ==
=== Contemporary reviews ===
In North America, critical reception to Do You Believe in Magic was favorable. Among the major American music magazines, Billboard's review panel categorized the album as pop, but termed it a "folk-rock-blues album", and Record World said it would appeal to fans of folk, rock, folk rock and "anyone inbetween". Several newspaper columnists emphasized the diversity of styles present on the album, though one reviewer complained that all the songs sounded alike. In The Village Voice, J. R. Goddard wrote that, though the Spoonful was made up of talented musicians, the album was "so dull and poorly engineered", a complaint the band themselves echoed in the year after its release. (Note: Boone later said the album's recording process reflected the state of pop music in 1965, when expediency was prioritized over perfecting individual takes.)

In The Ottawa Journal, Sandy Gardiner predicted the album would likely make an impact with the "In Crowd". Among the favorable reviewers was Ralph J. Gleason, a jazz critic at The San Francisco Chronicle who was one of the few columnists seriously reviewing rock music in 1965. Gleason highlighted the album's range of styles, which he thought showcased "the potential of contemporary rock". He suggested the album would appeal to jazz fans in the same way recent releases by the Beatles had, adding that the album's original material was "of the caliber of the Beatles and [Bob] Dylan". (Note: In a February 1966 article reflecting on the supremacy of Rubber Soul, Gleason wrote that the only other pop albums as consistently good were Dylan's two 1965 albums (Bringing It All Back Home and Highway 61 Revisited) and "possibly" Do You Believe in Magic.)

In Britain, Melody Maker's review panel determined the Spoonful was a "strange American group" whose style did not "fall into any particular brand", and the Liverpool Echo wrote they were "zany" but especially talented musically. Allen Evans of New Musical Express instead described the band as a beat group and compared their sound to the Beatles. In the magazine London Life, the actress Anita Harris disparaged the band's casual outfits and remarked that the English band the Trendsetters managed to be "more interesting and exciting" in one single than the Spoonful managed over an entire album.

=== Retrospective assessment ===
Retrospective ratings
Review scores
Source	Rating
AllMusic	4.5/5 stars
MSN Music (Consumer Guide)	A−
Encyclopedia of Popular Music	4/5 stars
MusicHound Rock	3.5/5
The Rolling Stone Album Guide	4/5 stars

Among retrospective commentators, the author Richie Unterberger complained that the Spoonful's albums were often "patchy" and "maddeningly inconsistent" because their album tracks were often of much lower quality than their hits. In contrast, Robert Christgau contended that on Do You Believe in Magic "the filler was prime too". Similarly, in his review for AllMusic, William Ruhlmann wrote that though the Spoonful were typically remembered for Sebastian's songwriting, the album provided "a well-rounded collection that demonstrated their effectiveness as a group."

== Compact disc reissues ==
After the Spoonful's breakup in 1968, many of their original multi-track master tapes were lost and presumed destroyed. The band's earliest CD reissues were instead made from the best available stereo masters, leaving the material sounding substandard when compared to reissues of other 1960s music. After rediscovering the original tapes in the 1990s, Buddha Records began digitally remastering the band's music.

Greatest Hits, a 2000 compilation album, was the earliest digital remaster of the Spoonful's music released on CD; six of its 26 tracks were from Do You Believe in Magic. BMG Heritage issued a CD remaster of Do You Believe in Magic on July 9, 2002. The two-disc set combined the album with the band's first 1966 album, Daydream, and it included alternate takes, demos and instrumental backing tracks.

== Track listing ==
All tracks are written and sung by John Sebastian, except where noted.

Side one
No.	Title	Writer(s)	Lead vocals	Length
1.	"Do You Believe in Magic"			2:04
2.	"Blues in the Bottle"	Traditional, adapt. and arr. by the Lovin' Spoonful, Peter Stampfel and Steve Weber	Zal Yanovsky	2:10
3.	"Sportin' Life"	Traditional, adapt. and arr. by the Lovin' Spoonful		4:03
4.	"My Gal"	Traditional, adapt. and arr. by the Lovin' Spoonful, Jim Kweskin and Erik Jacobsen		2:30
5.	"You Baby"	Barry Mann, Cynthia Weil, Phil Spector	Joe Butler	2:55
6.	"Fishin' Blues"	Traditional, adapt. and arr. by Sebastian		1:58
Total length:				15:40

Side two
No.	Title	Writer(s)	Lead vocals	Length
1.	"Did You Ever Have to Make Up Your Mind?"			2:00
2.	"Wild About My Lovin'"	Traditional, adapt. and arr. by Sebastian		2:38
3.	"The Other Side of This Life"	Fred Neil	Butler	2:30
4.	"Younger Girl"			2:23
5.	"On the Road Again"		Yanovsky	1:52
6.	"Night Owl Blues"		Instrumental	3:00
Total length:				14:23

2002 CD remaster bonus tracks
No.	Title	Writer(s)	Lead vocals	Length
13.	"Alley Oop"	Dallas Frazier	Yanovsky	2:14
14.	"Younger Girl" (demo version)			2:38
15.	"Blues in the Bottle" (alternate vocal version)	Traditional, adapt. and arr. by the Lovin' Spoonful, Stampfel and Weber		3:00
16.	"Wild About My Lovin'" (alternate vocal version)	Traditional, adapt. and arr. by Sebastian		2:36
17.	"The Other Side of This Life"	Neil	Instrumental	2:31
Total length:				12:59

Note

- Track lengths and songwriting credits are from the original LP liner notes. Lead vocal credits and bonus track information is according to the 2002 CD remaster.

== Personnel ==
According to the original 1965 liner notes, except where noted:

The Lovin' Spoonful

- John Sebastian – vocals, autoharp, guitar, harmonica
- Zal Yanovsky – vocals, lead guitar
- Steve Boone – bass guitar
- Joe Butler – vocals, drums

Additional musicians

- Gary Chester – tambourine ("Do You Believe in Magic")
- Alan Lorber – vocal arrangement ("Do You Believe in Magic")
- Jerry Yester – backing vocals and piano ("Do You Believe in Magic")

Production

- Erik Jacobsen – producer
- Peter and Antonia Stampfel – liner notes
- Chuck Stewart – cover photo
- Joel Tanner – cover design
- Val Valentin – engineering
- Harry Yarmark – engineering ("Do You Believe in Magic")

== Charts ==
Weekly chart performance
Chart (1965–66)	Peak position
US Billboard Top LPs	32
US Cash Box Top 100 Albums	71
US Record World 100 Top LPs	67

== Sources ==
- Anon. (1995). Do You Believe in Magic / Hums (Liner notes). The Lovin' Spoonful. Kama Sutra, Replay. 75517 49500 2.
- Anon. (2000). Greatest Hits (Liner notes). The Lovin' Spoonful. Buddha. 74465 99716 2.
- Barone, Richard (2022). Music + Revolution: Greenwich Village in the 1960s. Lanham, Maryland: Rowman & Littlefield. ISBN 978-1-4930-6302-4 – via Google Books.
- Boone, Steve; Moss, Tony (2014). Hotter Than a Match Head: My Life on the Run with The Lovin' Spoonful. Toronto: ECW Press. ISBN 978-1-77041-193-7 – via the Internet Archive.
- Brackett, Nathan; Hoard, Christian, eds. (2004). The New Rolling Stone Album Guide (4th ed.). New York City: Fireside/Simon & Schuster. ISBN 0-7432-0169-8. Archived from the original on October 12, 2019.
- Bronson, Fred (2003). The Billboard Book of Number One Hits. New York City: Billboard Books. ISBN 978-0-8230-7677-2 – via Google Books.
- Courrier, Kevin (2008). Artificial Paradise: The Dark Side of the Beatles' Utopian Dream. Santa Barbara, California: ABC-CLIO. ISBN 978-0-313-34587-6 – via Google Books.
- Diken, Dennis (2002). Daydream (Liner notes). The Lovin' Spoonful. Buddha, BMG Heritage, RCA, Kama Sutra. 74465 99731 2.
- Edmonds, Ben (2002). Do You Believe in Magic (Liner notes). The Lovin' Spoonful. Buddha, Kama Sutra. 74465 99730 2.
- Everett, Walter (2009). The Foundations of Rock: From "Blue Suede Shoes" to "Suite: Judy Blue Eyes". New York City: Oxford University Press. ISBN 978-0-19-531024-5 – via Google Books.
- Fletcher, Tony (2009). All Hopped Up and Ready to Go: Music from the Streets of New York 1927–77. New York City: W.W. Norton. ISBN 978-0-393-33483-8 – via the Internet Archive.
- Gould, Jonathan (2007). Can't Buy Me Love: The Beatles, Britain, and America. New York City: Three Rivers Press. ISBN 978-0-307-35338-2.
- Helander, Brock (1999). The Rockin' 60s: The People Who Made the Music. New York City: Schirmer Books. ISBN 978-0-02-864873-6 – via the Internet Archive.
- Jackson, Andrew Grant (2015). 1965: The Most Revolutionary Year in Music. New York City: Macmillan Publishers. ISBN 978-1-4668-6497-9 – via the Internet Archive.
- Larkin, Colin (2007). Encyclopedia of Popular Music (4th ed.). Oxford University Press. ISBN 978-0195313734.
- Mersereau, Bob (2015). The History of Canadian Rock 'n' Roll. Milwaukee, Wisconsin: Backbeat Books. ISBN 978-1-4950-2891-5 – via Google Books.
- Miles, Barry (2001). The Beatles Diary Volume 1: The Beatles Years. London: Omnibus Press. ISBN 978-0-7119-8308-3.
- Miles, Barry (2009). The British Invasion. New York City: Sterling Publishing Company, Inc. ISBN 978-1-4027-6976-4 – via Google Books.
- Nelson, Paul (1980). "Folk Rock". In Miller, Jim (ed.). The Rolling Stone Illustrated History of Rock and Roll (Revised and Updated ed.). New York City: Random House. pp. 231–234. ISBN 0-394-73938-8 – via the Internet Archive.
- Rucker, Leland (1996). "Lovin' Spoonful / John Sebastian". In Graff, Gary (ed.). MusicHound Rock: The Essential Album Guide. Detroit, Michigan: Visible Ink Press. pp. 422–423. ISBN 0-7876-1037-2 – via the Internet Archive.
- Savage, Jon (2015). 1966: The Year the Decade Exploded. London: Faber & Faber. ISBN 978-0-571-27762-9 – via the Internet Archive.
- Simons, David (2004). Studio Stories: How the Great New York Records Were Made: From Miles to Madonna, Sinatra to The Ramones. San Francisco, California: Backbeat Books. ISBN 978-0-87930-817-9 – via the Internet Archive.
- Stampfel, Peter; Stampfel, Antonia (1965). Do You Believe in Magic (Liner notes). The Lovin' Spoonful. Kama Sutra. KLP 8050.
- Unterberger, Richie (2002). Turn! Turn! Turn!: The '60s Folk-Rock Revolution. San Francisco: Backbeat Books. ISBN 0-87930-703-X.
- Unterberger, Richie (2003). Eight Miles High: Folk-Rock's Flight from Haight-Ashbury to Woodstock. San Francisco: Backbeat Books. ISBN 0-87930-743-9.
