= Do You Believe in Magic (song) =

1965 single by the Lovin' Spoonful

- Italian picture sleeve

Single by the Lovin' Spoonful

from the album Do You Believe in Magic
- B-side: "On the Road Again"
- Released: July 20, 1965
- Recorded: June 1965
- Studio: Bell Sound, New York City
- Genre: Folk rock, pop, rock
- Length: 2:05
- Label: Kama Sutra (US); Pye International (UK)
- Songwriter: John Sebastian
- Producer: Erik Jacobsen

The Lovin' Spoonful singles chronology
| "Do You Believe in Magic" (1965) | "You Didn't Have to Be So Nice" (1965) |

Audio
- "Do You Believe in Magic" on YouTube

"Do You Believe in Magic" is a song by the Canadian-American folk-rock band the Lovin' Spoonful. Written by John Sebastian, it was issued as the band's debut single in July 1965. The single peaked at number nine on the Billboard Hot 100. It later served as the title track of the band's debut album, issued that November. In 1978, Shaun Cassidy reached the Top 40 with his cover version.

== The Lovin' Spoonful version ==
John Sebastian composed "Do You Believe in Magic" in May 1965. Sebastian drew inspiration from a teenage girl who attended one of the Lovin' Spoonful's performances at the Night Owl Cafe, a club in the Greenwich Village neighborhood of New York City at which the band were then holding a residency. The younger girl stood in contrast to the older beatnik crowd who typically attended folk performances, and Sebastian recalled that "[she was] dancing like we danced – and not like the last generation danced". He also remembered: "Zal [Yanovsky] and I just elbowed each other the entire night, because to us, that young girl symbolized the fact that our audience was changing, that maybe they had finally found us." Sebastian composed the song the following night, and the rest of the band worked with him at the Hotel Albert to finish its arrangement.

In 1965, the Lovin' Spoonful originally recorded and released the song as the first single from their debut studio album Do You Believe in Magic. The single was well received by the public and became a top ten hit on the Billboard Hot 100, peaking at number 9. According to the lyrics, the magic referenced in the title is the power of music to supply happiness and freedom to both those who make it and those who listen to it. The Lovin' Spoonful's version was ranked number 216 on Rolling Stone's list of The 500 Greatest Songs of All Time. Billboard said of the original single release that the "pulsating folk-flavored rhythm number serves as a strong and exciting debut for new group in the Byrds vein." Cash Box described it as a "rollicking, teen-angled romancer with an infectious danceable riff." Record World said that it has "plenty of beat and plenty of contemporary grit sound."

In a 2007 DVD entitled The Lovin' Spoonful with John Sebastian - Do You Believe in Magic, author Sebastian illustrates how he sped up the three-chord intro from Martha and the Vandellas' "Heat Wave" to come up with the intro to "Do You Believe in Magic."

In 2002, "Do You Believe in Magic" by The Lovin' Spoonful was inducted into the Grammy Hall of Fame.

== Cover versions ==
"Do You Believe in Magic" became a top forty hit again in 1978 in both the US and Canada when Shaun Cassidy released his cover as a single. Cassidy's version reached number 31 on the Billboard Hot 100. The song was Cassidy's second successful remake of a 1960s hit, the first being "Da Doo Ron Ron" from his previous LP.

"Do You Believe in Magic" was covered by American pop rock duo Aly & AJ. Their version of the song appeared in the 2007 Disney film The Game Plan as well as on their debut studio album, Into the Rush, in addition to an appearance on the 2009 soundtrack to the TV show Wizards of Waverly Place. The video has Aly and AJ performing with acoustic guitars in their loft apartment, cuddling their dog, taking Polaroids and then finger painting.

== Personnel ==
According to Steve Boone, except where noted:

The Lovin' Spoonful

- John Sebastian – lead vocals, autoharp, acoustic guitar
- Zal Yanovsky – backing vocals, electric guitar
- Steve Boone – bass guitar
- Joe Butler – drums

Additional musicians

- Gary Chester – tambourine
- Alan Lorber – vocal arrangements
- Jerry Yester – backing vocals, piano

== Charts ==
=== Lovin' Spoonful version ===
Weekly chart performance
| Chart (1965) | Peak position |
|---|---|
| Canadian R.P.M. Play Sheet | 3 |
| US Billboard Hot 100 | 9 |
| US Cash Box Top 100 | 8 |
| US Record World 100 Top Pops | 4 |

Year-end chart performance
| Chart (1965) | Rank |
|---|---|
| US Billboard Top Singles | 89 |
| US Cash Box Top 100 Chart Hits | 80 |

=== Shaun Cassidy version ===
Weekly chart performance
| Chart (1978) | Peak position |
|---|---|
| Canada RPM Top Singles | 39 |
| US Billboard Hot 100 | 31 |
| US Cash Box Top 100 | 37 |

Year-end chart performance
| Chart (1978) | Rank |
|---|---|
| US (Joel Whitburn's Pop Annual) | 186 |

=== Aly & AJ version ===
Weekly chart performance
| Chart (2005) | Peak position |
|---|---|
| US Hot Singles Sales (Billboard) | 2 |

== Certifications ==
=== The Lovin' Spoonful ===
| Region | Certification | Certified units/sales |
|---|---|---|
| New Zealand (RMNZ) | Gold | 15,000^{‡} |
^{‡} Sales+streaming figures based on certification alone.

== Sources ==
- Boone, Steve; Moss, Tony (2014). Hotter Than a Match Head: My Life on the Run with The Lovin' Spoonful. Toronto: ECW Press. ISBN 978-1-77041-193-7 – via the Internet Archive.
- Edmonds, Ben (2000). Greatest Hits (Liner notes). The Lovin' Spoonful. Buddha, BMG Distribution. BG2 99716.
- Fletcher, Tony (2009). All Hopped Up and Ready to Go: Music from the Streets of New York 1927–77. New York City: W.W. Norton. ISBN 978-0-393-33483-8 – via the Internet Archive.
- Jackson, Andrew Grant (2015). 1965: The Most Revolutionary Year in Music. New York City: Macmillan Publishers. ISBN 978-1-4668-6497-9.
- Perone, James E. (2018). Listen to Pop! Exploring a Musical Genre. Santa Barbara, California: ABC-CLIO. ISBN 978-1-4408-6377-6 – via Google Books.
