= You Didn't Have to Be So Nice =

1965 single by the Lovin' Spoonful

- US picture sleeve

Single by the Lovin' Spoonful

from the album Daydream
- B-side: "My Gal"
- Released: November 1965
- Studio: Bell Sound, New York City
- Genre: Pop; folk rock
- Length: 2:29
- Label: Kama Sutra (US); Pye International (UK)
- Songwriters: John Sebastian, Steve Boone
- Producer: Erik Jacobsen

The Lovin' Spoonful singles chronology
"Do You Believe in Magic" (1965)	"You Didn't Have to Be So Nice" (1965)	"Daydream" (1966)

Audio
- "You Didn't Have to Be So Nice" on YouTube

"You Didn't Have to Be So Nice" is a song by the Canadian-American folk-rock band the Lovin' Spoonful. Written by John Sebastian and Steve Boone, it was issued on a non-album single in November 1965. The song was the Spoonful's second-consecutive single to enter the top ten in the United States, peaking at number ten. It was later included on the band's second album, Daydream, released in March 1966.

Boone's initial inspiration for the song was a remark he made on a date with Nurit Wilde. He began the piece as a basic melodic figure on the piano, but he appealed to Sebastian for help in finishing the song, marking the first of several compositions on which the pair collaborated. The finished recording employs a complex vocal arrangement devised by Jerry Yester, which later inspired Brian Wilson of the Beach Boys in composing his 1966 song "God Only Knows".

== Background and composition ==
Steve Boone began the earliest elements of "You Didn't Have to Be So Nice" at the Greenwich Village home of the parents of Joe Butler's girlfriend, Leslie Vega. Drawing inspiration from a remark he made on a date with Nurit Wilde, Boone started the composition on the piano as a basic melodic figure, which he initially titled "You Didn't Have to Be So Nice, I Would Have Liked You Anyway". After struggling to finish the song, he appealed to John Sebastian, the Lovin' Spoonful's principal songwriter, and the two collaborated to finish it. Sebastian later recalled that he and Boone finished the song in around half-an-hour when the band were between shows in San Francisco, where they toured in August 1965. The song was the first on which the pair collaborated. (Note: Their other joint credits include the 1966 songs "Butchie's Tune", "Full Measure" and "Summer in the City", the latter of which is also credited to Sebastian's brother, Mark.)

The rock critic Paul Nelson considers "You Didn't Have to Be So Nice" representative of folk rock, a genre the Spoonful were among the first to popularize. The author Richie Unterberger writes that like many folk-rock acts, the Spoonful's style bent towards pop music, and he considers "You Didn't Have to Be So Nice" "one of their poppier offerings". The musicologist James E. Perone also considers the song an example of pop music.

A verse of "You Didn't Have to Be So Nice"
The musicologist James E. Perone contends the song's vocal arrangement influenced the Beatles and the Beach Boys' early 1966 recordings.

According to Perone, more than any other song by the Spoonful, "You Didn't Have to Be So Nice" exhibits the band's stylistic connections to British Invasion acts, especially the Beatles. He identifies several hooks within the song, including an accompaniment figure of stepwise descending triplets played on an electric piano, an instrument the Beatles employed heavily in 1965 and 1966. For Perone, the song's most noticeable hook is a melodic figure in its introduction, which appears again later in the vocal part. He contends that the vocal arrangement's complexity – particularly the harmony, which switches between answering the lead, serving as its background or harmonizing at the end of phrases – anticipates the vocal arrangements heard on music released over the next year, including on the Beatles' album Revolver and the Beach Boys' Pet Sounds. (Note: Paul McCartney later acknowledged the Spoonful's third single, "Daydream", as the inspiration for the Beatles' "Good Day Sunshine" on Revolver. The musicologist Walter Everett suggests an additional inspiration may have been the drum triplets in the intro of "You Didn't Have to Be So Nice", which appear in the same place in the Beatles' song.) In his 1991 memoir, Brian Wilson, the principal songwriter of the Beach Boys, stated that "a John Sebastian song I had been listening to" inspired the melody of his 1966 song "God Only Knows", a statement the biographer Mark Dillon connects to the vocal layering on "You Didn't Have to Be So Nice". (Note: Wilson had stopped regularly touring with the Beach Boys in December 1964, but he saw the Spoonful perform at The Trip, a club on the Sunset Strip in Los Angeles, where the band held a multi-week residency in December 1965.)

== Recording and release ==
Amid their busy TV- and live-date schedule, the Spoonful recorded "You Didn't Have to Be So Nice" in November 1965 at Bell Sound Studios in New York City. The band's regular producer, Erik Jacobsen, produced the sessions. Jerry Yester, a friend of the band and a member of the Modern Folk Quartet, arranged the vocals, which features Sebastian on lead and Butler on backing.

The finished recording features similar elements to the band's debut single, "Do You Believe in Magic", including a drum fill introduction, a shuffling tempo and Sebastian playing the autoharp. The band overdubbed several elements, including chimes which had been leftover from another session, an addition the author Richie Unterberger compares to the productions of Phil Spector. Sebastian and Butler played a drum overdub together, which Sebastian later said was indebted to the style of the session drummer Hal Blaine. Zal Yanovsky added muted lead guitar work, inspired by the pedal steel guitar playing of Pete Drake on his 1962 instrumental "Pleading".

Work on "You Didn't Have to Be So Nice" was completed too late for it to be included on the Spoonful's debut album, Do You Believe in Magic, which Kama Sutra Records issued in November 1965. The label instead issued the song that month as a non-album single, and the Spoonful promoted it during their second appearance on the television series Hullabaloo, broadcast November 1. The review panel for Billboard magazine predicted the song would equal the success of "Do You Believe in Magic", which had peaked at number nine on the magazine's Hot 100 chart. "You Didn't Have to Be So Nice" entered the Hot 100 on November 27, and it remained on the chart for twelve weeks, peaking in January 1966 at number ten, and it reached number two in Canada. The song was later included on the band's second album, Daydream, released in March 1966, and it has appeared on subsequent compilation albums of the band's material, including The Best of the Lovin' Spoonful (1967), Anthology (1990), and Greatest Hits (2000).

Pye International Records, which held UK distribution rights to Kama Sutra product, issued the single there on January 14, 1966. Like "Do You Believe in Magic", it failed to chart in the UK. (Note: The chart performance of "Do You Believe in Magic" was hindered by the release of a similar-sounding cover by an English band, the Pack. Another English band, the Boston Crabs, covered "You Didn't Have to Be So Nice" around the time the original was issued in the UK, in January 1966.) The band remained generally unknown in the UK until April, when their follow-up single "Daydream" made to number two in the British charts in conjunction with a ten-day promotional tour.

== Charts ==
Weekly chart performance
Chart (1965–66)	Peak position
Canadian R.P.M. Play Sheet	2
US Billboard Hot 100	10
US Cash Box Top 100	11
US Record World 100 Top Pops	9

== Sources ==
- Badman, Keith (2004). The Beach Boys: The Definitive Diary of America's Greatest Band, on Stage and in the Studio. San Francisco, California: Backbeat Books. ISBN 978-0-87930-818-6 – via the Internet Archive.
- Boone, Steve; Moss, Tony (2014). Hotter Than a Match Head: My Life on the Run with The Lovin' Spoonful. Toronto: ECW Press. ISBN 978-1-77041-193-7 – via the Internet Archive.
- Diken, Denis (2002). Daydream (Liner notes). The Lovin' Spoonful. Buddha, BMG Heritage. 74465 99731 2.
- Dillon, Mark (2012). Fifty Sides of the Beach Boys: The Songs That Tell Their Story. Toronto: ECW Press. ISBN 978-1-77041-071-8.
- Edmonds, Ben (2002). Do You Believe in Magic (Liner notes). The Lovin' Spoonful. Buddha, Kama Sutra. 74465 99730 2.
- Everett, Walter (1999). The Beatles as Musicians: Revolver through the Anthology. New York City: Oxford University Press. ISBN 978-0-19-512941-0. Archived from the original on April 7, 2024 – via Google Books.
- Helander, Brock (1999). The Rockin' 60s: The People Who Made the Music. New York City: Schirmer Books. ISBN 978-0-02-864873-6 – via the Internet Archive.
- Jackson, Andrew Grant (2015). 1965: The Most Revolutionary Year in Music. New York City: Macmillan Publishers. ISBN 978-1-4668-6497-9 – via the Internet Archive.
- Milward, John (2021). Americanaland: Where Country & Western Met Rock 'n' Roll. Champaign, Illinois: University of Illinois Press. ISBN 978-0-252-05281-1. Archived from the original on January 13, 2024 – via Google Books.
- Nelson, Paul (1980). "Folk Rock". In Miller, Jim (ed.). The Rolling Stone Illustrated History of Rock and Roll (Revised and Updated ed.). New York City: Random House. pp. 231–234. ISBN 0-394-73938-8 – via the Internet Archive.
- Perone, James E. (2018). Listen to Pop! Exploring a Musical Genre. Santa Barbara, California: ABC-CLIO. ISBN 978-1-4408-6377-6. Archived from the original on May 10, 2023 – via Google Books.
- Priore, Domenic (2007). Smile: The Story of Brian Wilson's Lost Masterpiece. London: Bobcat Books. ISBN 978-0-8256-7350-4.
- Wilson, Brian; Gold, Todd (1991). Wouldn't It Be Nice: My Own Story. New York City: Harper Collins. ISBN 978-0-06018-313-4.
