= Daydream (The Lovin' Spoonful album) =

Studio album by the Lovin' Spoonful
- Released: March 1966
- Recorded: November–December 1965
- Studio: Bell Sound and Columbia 7th Avenue, New York City; RCA and Sunset Sound, Hollywood
- Genre: Folk rock
- Length: 29:17
- Label: Kama Sutra (US); Pye International (UK)
- Producer: Erik Jacobsen

The Lovin' Spoonful chronology
Do You Believe in Magic (1965)	Daydream (1966)	What's Shakin' (1966)

Singles from Daydream
- 1. "You Didn't Have to Be So Nice" Released: November 1965; 2. "Daydream" Released: February 1966

Daydream is the second studio album by the Canadian-American folk-rock band the Lovin' Spoonful. Released in March 1966, it features two of their hits: "Daydream", which reached No. 2 in the US Billboard Top 40 charts, and "You Didn't Have to Be So Nice," which reached No. 10.

== History ==
The Lovin' Spoonful recorded most of Daydream in four days at Bell Sound Studios in New York City, from December 13 to 16, 1965. Some songs had been recorded in November, including the non-album single "You Didn't Have to Be So Nice". Sessions also took place at Columbia's 7th Avenue studio in New York City and RCA and Sunset Sound in Hollywood, Los Angeles. With only five originals on the band's debut release, Do You Believe in Magic, Daydream featured much more songwriting by Lovin' Spoonful co-founder singer and vocalist John Sebastian, who either wrote or co-wrote all but one of the songs on this release.

Kama Sutra Records issued Daydream in the United States in March 1966. Release of the album followed in the United Kingdom on April 29.

== Covers ==
The song "Daydream" was recorded by Bobby Darin for his album If I Were A Carpenter. British pop group Right Said Fred took the song "Daydream" to Number 29 on the UK Singles Chart in 1992. The New Jersey band Yo La Tengo released its arrangement of "Butchie's Tune" on their 2015 album Stuff Like That There. In 1967 Scott McKenzie recorded "It's Not Time Now" for his debut album The Voice of Scott McKenzie.

== Reception ==
Contemporary ratings
Review scores
Source	Rating
New Musical Express	4/4 stars
Record Mirror	4/5 stars

Retrospective professional ratings
Review scores
Source	Rating
AllMusic	4/5 stars
Encyclopedia of Popular Music	5/5 stars
MusicHound Rock	3.5/5
Select	2/5 medals

Writing for AllMusic, Gary Mollica describes the album as "very strong". It was voted number 767 in the third edition of Colin Larkin's All Time Top 1000 Albums (2000). The album reached number 9 on the Finnish Album Chart in August 1966.

== Track listing ==
All tracks are written and sung by John Sebastian, except where noted.

Side one
No.	Title	Lead vocals	Length
1.	"Daydream"		2:18
2.	"There She Is"	Butler and Sebastian	1:55
3.	"It's Not Time Now" (Sebastian, Zal Yanovsky)	Sebastian and Yanovsky	2:45
4.	"Warm Baby"		2:00
5.	"Day Blues" (Sebastian, Joe Butler)	Yanovsky and Sebastian	3:12
6.	"Let the Boy Rock and Roll" (Sebastian, Butler)		2:32
Total length:			14:42

Side two
No.	Title	Lead vocals	Length
1.	"Jug Band Music"		2:49
2.	"Didn't Want to Have to Do It"		2:06
3.	"You Didn't Have to Be So Nice" (Sebastian, Steve Boone)		2:29
4.	"Bald Headed Lena" (Edward Snead, Willie Perryman)	Yanovsky	2:22
5.	"Butchie's Tune" (Sebastian, Boone)	Butler	2:34
6.	"Big Noise from Speonk" (Sebastian, Boone, Yanovsky, Butler)	Instrumental	2:15
Total length:			14:35

Note

- The original US release credited "Butchie's Tune" to only Sebastian, but the UK release and later reissues credit Sebastian and Boone.

== Personnel ==
According to the album's original liner notes, except where noted:

The Lovin' Spoonful

- John Sebastian – lead vocals, guitars, harmonica, autoharp; lead guitar ("It's Not Time Now"); additional drums ("You Didn't Have to Be So Nice")
- Zal Yanovsky – lead vocals; lead guitar (all tracks except "It's Not Time Now"); six-string bass guitar ("Jug Band Music"); gargling ("Bald Headed Lena") (Note: The original liner notes credit Zal's water gargling as "Electric Gorgle [sic]".)
- Steve Boone – bass guitar; piano ("Daydream"); chimes ("You Didn't Have to Be So Nice")
- Joe Butler – lead vocals, drums; spoons ("Daydream")

Production

- Erik Jacobsen – producer

== Charts ==
Weekly chart performance
Chart (1966)	Peak position
Finland (Suomen Virallinen)	9
UK New Musical Express Best Selling LPs	9
UK Record Retailer LPs Chart	8
US Billboard Top LPs	10
US Cash Box Top 100 Albums	25
US Record World 100 Top LPs	7

Year-end chart performance
Chart (1966)	Ranking
US Billboard	85
US Cash Box	49
