= Daydream (The Lovin' Spoonful song) =

1966 single by the Lovin' Spoonful

- US picture sleeve

Single by the Lovin' Spoonful

from the album Daydream
- B-side: "Night Owl Blues"
- Released: February 1966
- Recorded: December 1965
- Studio: Bell Sound, New York City
- Genre: Pop; folk rock
- Length: 2:18
- Label: Kama Sutra (US); Pye International (UK)
- Songwriter: John Sebastian
- Producer: Erik Jacobsen

The Lovin' Spoonful US singles chronology
"You Didn't Have to Be So Nice" (1965)	"Daydream" (1966)	"Did You Ever Have to Make Up Your Mind?" (1966)

The Lovin' Spoonful UK singles chronology
"You Didn't Have to Be So Nice" (1966)	"Daydream" (1966)	"Summer in the City" (1966)

Licensed audio
- "Daydream" on YouTube

"Daydream" is a song by the Canadian-American folk-rock band the Lovin' Spoonful. Written by John Sebastian, it was issued as a single in February 1966 and was the title track of the band's second album, Daydream, released the following month. The song was the Spoonful's third consecutive single to enter the top ten in the United States, and it was their best performing to that point, reaching number two. The single's European release coincided with a British and Swedish promotional tour, leading the song to be the band's first major hit outside North America. It topped sales charts in Canada and Sweden, and it was ultimately the band's most successful record in the United Kingdom, where it reached number two.

Sebastian composed "Daydream" in November 1965 in an effort to lift his spirits amid a grueling three-week tour of the American South. He was initially inspired by the music of the Supremes, with whom the Spoonful were then touring, and the final composition relates to his earliest influences in jug band music. The following month, during a break from their busy touring schedule, the Spoonful recorded the song at Bell Sound Studios in New York City. Among the instruments on the finished recording are a honky-tonk piano and four differently textured guitars, one of which uses a volume-control pedal. "Daydream" proved influential, especially among British musicians, directly inspiring the 1966 compositions "Good Day Sunshine" by the Beatles and "Sunny Afternoon" by the Kinks.

== Background and composition ==
John Sebastian composed "Daydream" in November 1965, during a 19-day tour through the American South. The Lovin' Spoonful served as a support act during the tour for the American girl group the Supremes, and the two groups traveled together on the same bus. The Spoonful generally enjoyed the experience but found the schedule physically exhausting, and Sebastian additionally missed his girlfriend, Loretta "Lorey" Kaye. On a rainy day near the tour's end, Sebastian was feeling particularly depressed and sought to raise his own spirits by writing a song. While riding the bus to their November 27 show in Greensboro, North Carolina, he composed "Daydream", finishing the song in around twenty minutes.

Sebastian initially hoped to compose a song like the Supremes' 1964 singles "Baby Love" and "Where Did Our Love Go", both of which he thought had a "straight eighth feel". Employing a "trick figure" he had devised months earlier to play the songs on guitar, his arrangement of "Baby Love" for a single guitar transformed into "Daydream". The song employs swing, a rhythmic feel commonly heard in both jazz and blues, but Sebastian later clarified that, like both of the Supremes' songs, the shuffle "[is not] all the way expressed". For his vocal, Sebastian later said he was aiming to sound like Geoff Muldaur, a vocalist in the Jim Kweskin Jug Band, a jug band group which was particularly influential on the Spoonful.

The verses of "Daydream" use a I–VI^{m7}–ii–V chord progression and the refrain uses IV–i^{°7}–I–VI^{m7}. The musicologist Walter Everett writes that because the song's verses always end with half cadences, it means the song never "[achieves] a full-cadence closure" but instead fades out while still feeling incomplete. Zal Yanovsky, the Spoonful's lead guitarist, later compared the song's melody to that of "Got a Date With an Angel", a 1934 hit by the American jazz musician Hal Kemp. Paul McCartney of the Beatles described "Daydream" as a having a "traditional, almost trad-jazz feel".

The author Richie Unterberger connects "Daydream" to the Spoonful's jug band roots, writing that its only major difference from 1920s and '30s jug band recordings is its electric arrangement. The journalist Paul Williams similarly writes the song owes much to the jug band tradition, adding that the lyrics, which describe a love-fueled bliss boosted by beautiful weather, seem almost ad-libbed by Sebastian. Unterberger writes that, when paired with the song's bright melody and lyrics, the arrangement morphs the number into a pop song. The author James E. Perone also characterizes it as pop music, and the critic Paul Nelson considers it, alongside the Spoonful's other singles, as being representative of folk rock.

== Recording ==
Amid a busy TV and live-date schedule, the Spoonful recorded most of their second album Daydream over four days, from December 13 to 16, 1965. "Daydream" was among the songs recorded during the sessions, which took place at Bell Sound Studios in New York City and were produced by the band's regular producer, Erik Jacobsen.

[Zal Yanovsky and I] did twenty-odd takes because it involved two guitar figures that had no swing or variation to them. ... We'd be good for two or three verses and then sooner or later one guy would get ahead of the other. ... "Daydream" is, in fact, a splicing wonder.

— John Sebastian recalling producer Erik Jacobsen splicing different takes together to create a complete track, 2002

The song's backing track consisted of only two guitars: Sebastian played his 1958 Les Paul electric and Yanovsky borrowed Sebastian's Heritage Gibson acoustic. Due to the song's staccato rhythm, the two musicians struggled to keep in sync. They soon abandoned the song to work on other compositions, returning to it when Jacobsen spliced different takes together to establish a complete guitar track. The band next overdubbed several elements: Steve Boone added honky-tonk piano, Joe Butler played spoons and a slapstick and Yanovsky added extra electric guitar parts on his Guild Thunderbird. Sebastian sang and whistled, and he played a harmonica contribution which he later said was derivative of Nino Tempo and April Stevens' 1963 hit "Deep Purple".

The finished recording staggers the entrance of four differently textured guitars, an arrangement which Everett describes as "Beatlesque". The last guitar to enter features a volume-control pedal, a device which had only recently begun to be employed in popular music and would be used on many recordings in 1966. Paired with a guitar, the device hides the initial attack and decay of the instrument's tone while allowing the player to more easily control volume changes than through using the guitar's volume control knob. (Note: The Beatles' use of the volume/tone-control pedal on their 1965 album Help! helped popularize the device. They had initially heard it in Marino Marini's 1958 song "The Honeymoon Song (Bound by Love)". The Everly Brothers also used it in 1960 on "That's Just Too Much".)

== Release and commercial performance ==
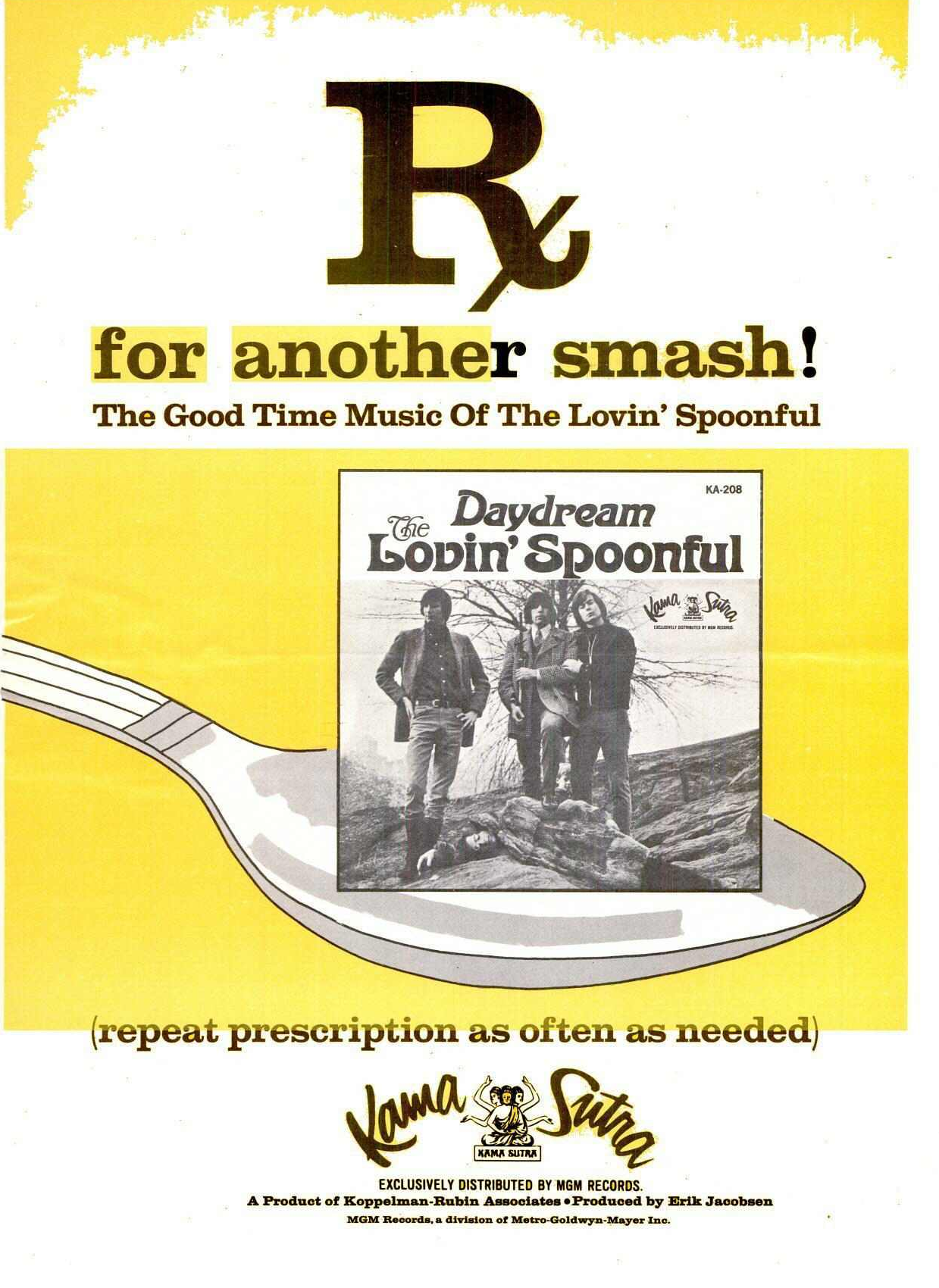
Kama Sutra Records ad for the "Daydream" single

The Spoonful debuted "Daydream" on the American musical variety series Hullabaloo on February 7, 1966, and Kama Sutra Records issued it as a single in the United States that month. The song furthered speculation from the press and public about a link between the Spoonful and drug use, fueled by the lyrics' use of the term "dream", which by 1966 was sometimes used to connote the experience of taking psychedelic drugs. Accompanying the single's release, a trade ad appearing in Billboard made several drug allusions, drawing the ire of the band, who had regularly sought to distance themselves from drug associations. (Note: The press had often speculated that the band's name alluded to the spoon used in injecting heroin, but it actually referenced the 1963 song "Coffee Blues" by the country blues musician Mississippi John Hurt.) The following month, the song served as both the opening- and title-track of the Lovin' Spoonful's second album.

"Daydream" entered the Billboard Hot 100 on February 26 and remained on the chart for twelve weeks, peaking at number two for two weeks in mid-April. It was the Spoonful's third consecutive single to reach the top ten and their highest charting single to date. The single was kept from the top spot on Billboard's chart by the Righteous Brothers' "(You're My) Soul and Inspiration", but it reached number one on Cash Box magazine's chart and also reached the top spot in Canada. On Billboard's 1966 Year-End singles chart, "Daydream" ranked number 38, one of three singles by the Spoonful to make the chart. (Note: "Summer in the City" was number 35 and "Did You Ever Have to Make Up Your Mind?" number 48. On Cash Box's year-end chart, "Daydream" was the band's highest ranking single at number 27.) The song's success expanded the band's popularity such that they were able to headline their concerts rather than perform as a support act. (Note: When the Spoonful toured with the Beach Boys in March and April 1966, the two groups alternated top billing.)

"Daydream" became a major international hit. Before the single's release in early 1966, the Spoonful was successful in North America but remained generally unknown in the United Kingdom. Neither of their first two singles had charted in the country. To expand the band's popularity to an international audience, their management organized several concert and television appearances in England and Sweden for the end of April 1966. To coincide with the tour, Pye International Records issued "Daydream" as a single in the UK on April 1. By mid-May, the song had reached number two on all of the major British singles charts, bested only by Manfred Mann's single "Pretty Flamingo". "Daydream" reached number one on Wonderful Radio London's Fab 40 chart, and it additionally reached number one on the Swedish Kvällstoppen chart.

== Critical reception ==
Paul Williams reviewed "Daydream" in the third issue of his American magazine Crawdaddy!, one of the earliest publications devoted to rock and roll criticism. Williams described the song as "the sort of thing that could get tiring and repetitious, but doesn't". He counted the Spoonful as one of the few groups with authentic roots in folk music, adding that rather than simply turning jug band songs electric, the band instead worked to incorporate new sounds from rock music into their productions. He concluded that the song was both popular and good, and he expected it to be another top ten hit for the band. The review panel for Billboard similarly predicted "Daydream" would equal the success of the Spoonful's most recent single, "You Didn't Have to Be So Nice", which reached number ten on the Billboard Hot 100 in January 1966. The review panel for Record World called "Daydream" "wonderful", writing that it managed to sound both contemporary and "oldtime" simultaneously.

Among British critics, Penny Valentine of Disc & Music Echo called the single "gorgeous" and predicted it would be "[a] huge hit". Derek Johnson of New Musical Express described "Daydream" as both "tuneful and pleasantly hummable", but also "not very meaty and maybe a shade corny." Reviewing the latest releases in Melody Maker's "Blind Date" column, the singer Dusty Springfield also described the song as "corny", but she used the term favorably. She compared its sound to the American jazz pianist Fats Waller, adding that she liked the Spoonful "just for daring to do this number". The anonymous reviewer for the Whitstable Times also wrote that on first listen, the song sounded both "corny" and "outdated" because it was so out of step with contemporary trends, but that it soon proved unforgettable after repeat listens. The critic for the Liverpool Echo wrote that with the new single, the Spoonful "may be heralding a new era for pop music."

== Influence ==
In the pop music scene, where "feed-back" has become a fetish and electronic distortion a trademark of hit songs, there emerges "Daydream," a very simple, uncluttered tune so out of place ... that record producers are having to think again about what makes a hit.

— New Musical Express, May 1966

The simple arrangement of "Daydream" was out of step with contemporary pop music trends, and it inspired numerous similar compositions from British musicians. Soon after the song's release, the Beatles and members of the Rolling Stones lauded the Spoonful as the "hot new group". John Lennon and George Harrison first met the Spoonful after attending their concert at the Marquee club in London on April 18, 1966. A week later, the Beatles recorded a version of Lennon's composition "I'm Only Sleeping" in the style of "Daydream", but they abandoned the arrangement for the final version issued on their 1966 album Revolver. (Note: The "Daydream"-inspired version of "I'm Only Sleeping" was officially released in 2022 as "take 2" on the expanded reissue of Revolver.)

In an attempt to write a song in the same vein as "Daydream", Paul McCartney composed "Good Day Sunshine", which the Beatles recorded in June during the sessions for Revolver. "Good Day Sunshine" uses no guitars, but like "Daydream" it features honky-tonk piano, a shuffling beat, applied dominants and similarly themed lyrics. (Note: Everett suggests the drum triplets heard at the end of the intro of "Good Day Sunshine" may have also been inspired by "You Didn't Have to Be So Nice".) The Spoonful met all four of the Beatles in August 1966, before the band's Shea Stadium show during their 1966 US tour, but Sebastian did not learn of the Spoonful's influence on "Good Day Sunshine" until McCartney mentioned it in a 1984 interview. Sebastian later reflected that he often wondered about the Spoonful's impact on other artists, but the Beatles' originality meant that "when they did cop an idea from somebody else it never occurred to you."

After seeing the Spoonful perform in England during their April 1966 tour, Ray Davies, the principal songwriter of the Kinks, was regularly influenced by their sound. "Daydream" directly inspired him in writing the Kinks' 1966 single "Sunny Afternoon", which they recorded on May 13. The author Barry Miles additionally suggests "Daydream" inspired the Small Faces' 1968 single "Lazy Sunday". The pop group the Bee Gees recorded a faithful cover of "Daydream" in mid-1966, but it went unissued.

== Personnel ==
According to Steve Boone in his autobiography, except where noted:

- John Sebastian – vocal, electric guitar, harmonica, whistling
- Zal Yanovsky – electric and acoustic guitars
- Steve Boone – honky-tonk piano
- Joe Butler – slapstick, spoons

== Charts ==
=== Weekly charts ===
Weekly chart performance
Chart (1966)	Peak position
Belgium (Ultratop 40 Wallonia)	49
Canada (R.P.M.) Top Singles	1
Finland (Soumen Virallinen)	20
Netherlands (Veronica Top 40)	12
New Zealand (Listener)	1
Sweden (Kvällstoppen)	1
Sweden (Tio i Topp)	2
UK (Disc and Music Echo)	2
UK (Melody Maker)	2
UK (N.M.E.)	2
UK (Record Retailer)	2
US Billboard Hot 100	2
US Cash Box Top 100	1
US Record World 100 Top Pops	2
West Germany (Musikmarkt)	30

=== Year-end charts ===
Year-end chart performance
Chart (1966)	Rank
Netherlands (Veronica Top 100)	90
US Billboard Top Records	38
US Cash Box Top 100	27

== Sources ==
- Badman, Keith (2004). The Beach Boys: The Definitive Diary of America's Greatest Band, on Stage and in the Studio. San Francisco, California: Backbeat Books. ISBN 978-0-87930-818-6 – via the Internet Archive.
- Boone, Steve; Moss, Tony (2014). Hotter Than a Match Head: My Life on the Run with The Lovin' Spoonful. Toronto: ECW Press. ISBN 978-1-77041-193-7 – via Google Books.
- Diken, Dennis (2002). Daydream (Liner notes). The Lovin' Spoonful. Buddha, BMG Heritage. 74465 99731 2.
- Everett, Walter (1999). The Beatles as Musicians: Revolver through the Anthology. New York City: Oxford University Press. ISBN 978-0-19-512941-0 – via Google Books.
- Everett, Walter (2009). The Foundations of Rock: From "Blue Suede Shoes" to "Suite: Judy Blue Eyes". New York City: Oxford University Press. ISBN 978-0-19-531024-5 – via Google Books.
- Everett, Walter (2017). "Detroit and Memphis: The Soul of Revolver". In Reising, Russell (ed.). 'Every Sound There Is': The Beatles' Revolver and the Transformation of Rock and Roll. Abingdon-on-Thames: Routledge. pp. 25–57. ISBN 978-1-351-21868-9 – via Google Books.
- Hallberg, Eric (1993). Eric Hallberg presenterar Kvällstoppen i P3: Sveriges Radios topplista över veckans 20 mest sålda skivor (in Swedish). Drift Musik. ISBN 91-630-2140-4.
- Hallberg, Eric; Henningsson, Ulf (1998). Ulf Henningsson presenterar Tio i topp med de utslagna på försök 1961–74 (in Swedish) (1. uppl ed.). Stockholm: Premium. ISBN 91-972712-5-X.
- Hinman, Doug (2004). The Kinks: All Day and All of the Night: Day by Day Concerts, Recordings, and Broadcasts, 1961–1996. San Francisco, California: Backbeat Books. ISBN 978-0-87930-765-3.
- Howlett, Kevin (2022). Revolver: Special Edition (book). The Beatles. Apple Records.
- Jackson, Andrew Grant (2015). 1965: The Most Revolutionary Year in Music. New York City: Macmillan Publishers. ISBN 978-1-4668-6497-9 – via the Internet Archive.
- Miles, Barry (1997). Paul McCartney: Many Years from Now. New York City: Henry Holt. ISBN 0-8050-5249-6 – via the Internet Archive.
- Miles, Barry (2001). The Beatles Diary Volume 1: The Beatles Years. London: Omnibus Press. ISBN 978-0-7119-8308-3 – via Google Books.
- Myers, Marc (2017). Anatomy of a Song: The Oral History of 45 Iconic Hits That Changed Rock, R&B and Pop. London: Grove Press. ISBN 978-1-61185-959-1 – via the Internet Archive.
- Nelson, Paul (1980). "Folk Rock". In Miller, Jim (ed.). The Rolling Stone Illustrated History of Rock and Roll (Revised and Updated ed.). New York City: Random House. pp. 231–234. ISBN 0-394-73938-8 – via the Internet Archive.
- Nyman, Jake (2005). Suomi soi 4: Suuri suomalainen listakirja (in Finnish) (1st ed.). Helsinki: Tammi. ISBN 951-31-2503-3.
- Perlmutter, Adam (2010). Chicken Soup for the Soul Piano Songbook: 40 Inspirational and Heartwarming Songs. Milwaukee, Wisconsin: Hal Leonard. ISBN 978-1-4584-8387-4 – via Google Books.
- Perone, James E. (2018). Listen to Pop! Exploring a Musical Genre. Santa Barbara, California: ABC-CLIO. p. 115. ISBN 978-1-4408-6377-6 – via Google Books.
- Rodriguez, Robert (2012). Revolver: How the Beatles Re-Imagined Rock 'n' Roll. Montclair, New Jersey: Backbeat Books. ISBN 978-1-61713-009-0 – via the Internet Archive.
- Rogan, Johnny (2015). Ray Davies: A Complicated Life. London: The Bodley Head. ISBN 978-1-84792-317-2 – via the Internet Archive.
- Savage, Jon (2015). 1966: The Year the Decade Exploded. London: Faber & Faber. ISBN 978-0-571-27762-9 – via the Internet Archive.
- Stanley, Bob (2023). Bee Gees: Children of the World. London: Nine Eight Books. ISBN 978-1-78870-543-1 – via Google Books.
- Turner, Steve (2005). A Hard Day's Write: The Stories Behind Every Beatles Song (New and Updated ed.). New York City: HarperCollins. ISBN 978-0-06-084409-7 – via the Internet Archive.
- Turner, Steve (2017). Beatles '66: The Revolutionary Year. New York City: Ecco. ISBN 978-0-06-247558-9 – via the Internet Archive.
- Unterberger, Richie (2002). Turn! Turn! Turn!: The '60s Folk-Rock Revolution. San Francisco: Backbeat Books. ISBN 0-87930-703-X – via the Internet Archive.
- Williams, Paul (2002). "'Daydream' – The Lovin' Spoonful". The Crawdaddy! Book: Writings (and Images) from the Magazine of Rock. Milwaukee, Wisconsin: Hal Leonard Corporation. p. 25. ISBN 0-634-02958-4 – via Google Books.
- Womack, Kenneth (2018). Sound Pictures: The Life of Beatles Producer George Martin, The Later Years, 1966–2016. Chicago Review Press. ISBN 978-0-912777-77-1 – via Google Books.
