= Did You Ever Have to Make Up Your Mind? =

1965 song by the Lovin' Spoonful

- US picture sleeve

Single by the Lovin' Spoonful

from the album Do You Believe in Magic
- B-side: "Didn't Want to Have to Do It"
- Released: April 1966
- Recorded: September 1965
- Studio: Bell Sound, New York City
- Genre: Pop; folk rock
- Length: 2:00
- Label: Kama Sutra
- Songwriter: John Sebastian
- Producer: Erik Jacobsen

The Lovin' Spoonful US singles chronology
"Daydream" (1966)	"Did You Ever Have to Make Up Your Mind?" (1966)	"Summer in the City" (1966)

Audio
- "Did You Ever Have to Make up Your Mind?" on YouTube

"Did You Ever Have to Make Up Your Mind?" is a song by the Canadian-American folk-rock band the Lovin' Spoonful. Written by John Sebastian, it first appeared on the band's debut album Do You Believe in Magic in October 1965 before being issued as a single in April 1966. The song was the Spoonful's fourth consecutive single to enter the top ten in the United States, reaching number two, and Billboard ranked it number 48 on its year-end chart.

== Recording and release ==
The Lovin' Spoonful recorded "Did You Ever Have to Make Up Your Mind?" in September 1965 at Bell Sound Studios in New York City. It was the final song completed for the band's debut album, Do You Believe in Magic, which Kama Sutra Records issued on October 23, 1965. The song was sequenced as the opening track of side two.

Though "Did You Ever Have to Make Up Your Mind?" was an album track, Canadian radio stations played it extensively in December 1965. The song's radio play prompted Quality Records to issue it as a single in Canada, and it reached number 10 on the national charts in February 1966. Due to the song's Canadian success, Kama Sutra issued it as a single in the US that April. It peaked in June at number two on the Billboard Hot 100, marking the Spoonful's fourth-consecutive single to reach the US top ten. A second Canadian release peaked that July at number six, and Billboard later ranked it number 48 on its 1966 year-end chart. In the UK, Pye International Records opted to not issue the song as a single, but instead featured it as the lead track of an EP, which reached number three on Record Mirror's EP chart in July 1966.

Billboard called the song an "easy rockin' ballad" that would be an "off-beat winner for the hot group." Cash Box described the song as an "easy-going, lyrical blues-tinged item which claims that romantic decisions are extremely difficult to make."

== Charts ==
=== Weekly charts ===
Weekly chart performance
Chart (1966)	Peak position
Australia	17
Canadian R.P.M. 100	6
Finland (Soumen Virallinen)	26
New Zealand (Listener)	5
Sweden (Kvällstoppen)	5
US Billboard Hot 100	2
US Cash Box Top 100	4
US Record World 100 Top Pops	3

=== Year-end charts ===
Year-end chart performance
Chart (1966)	Ranking
US Billboard	48
US Cash Box	57

== Covers ==
- Bud Shank on his 1967 album A Spoonful of Jazz
- Dick Rosmini recorded it for his 1969 album A Genuine Rosmini
- The Good Brothers included it on their 1980 album Best of the Good Brothers: Live
- Curtis Stigers included it on his 2003 album You Inspire Me
- Thao with the Get Down Stay Down on the 2009 Thao/The Thermals Record Store Day Split 7"

== Sources ==
- Edmonds, Ben (2002). Do You Believe in Magic (Liner notes). The Lovin' Spoonful. Buddha Records, Kama Sutra Records. 74465 99730 2.
- Savage, Jon (2015). 1966: The Year the Decade Exploded. London: Faber & Faber. ISBN 978-0-571-27762-9.
