= Nurit Wilde =

Israeli-born photographer and socialite

Nurit Wilde (Hebrew: נורית ויילד) is an Israeli-born photographer and socialite. She was an occasional actress in the 1960s and 1970s and was closely associated with the creative community of that era in the Laurel Canyon neighborhood of Los Angeles.

Among her photographic subjects were the Monkees, with whom she guest-starred (uncredited, but with notable roles) in two episodes of their television series. She is the mother of Michael Nesmith's third child, Jason; Nesmith was married at the time to his first wife and Jason was born six months after Nesmith's second son Jonathan.

The Lovin' Spoonful song "You Didn't Have to Be So Nice" was inspired by Wilde, per bassist/songwriter Steve Boone.
