= Zal Yanovsky =

Canadian folk-rock guitarist (1944–2002)

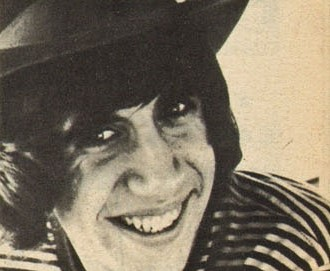
- Yanovsky, 1967

Background information
- Born: Zalman Yanovsky; December 19, 1944; Toronto, Ontario, Canada
- Died: December 13, 2002 (aged 57) Kingston, Ontario, Canada
- Genres: Folk, folk rock, rock and roll
- Occupations: Musician, songwriter, restaurateur
- Instruments: Guitar, vocals
- Years active: 1964–1971, 1980, 1996, 2000
- Formerly of: The Lovin' Spoonful; The Mugwumps; The Halifax Three
- Spouses: Jackie Burroughs (m. 1967; div. 1968); Rose Richardson (m. before 1979)

Zalman Yanovsky (December 19, 1944 – December 13, 2002) was a Canadian folk-rock musician and restaurateur. Born in Toronto, he was the son of political cartoonist Avrom Yanovsky and teacher Nechama Yanovsky (née Gemeril). He played lead guitar and sang for the Lovin' Spoonful, a rock band which he founded with John Sebastian in 1964.

In 1967, he left the Lovin' Spoonful and was replaced by Jerry Yester. Yanovsky released a solo album in 1968 titled Alive and Well in Argentina. In 1971, he retired from music and became a restaurateur, opening his own restaurant in 1979 and writing cookbooks. He continued to perform occasionally.

Yanovsky was inducted into the Canadian Music Hall of Fame in 1996. He was also inducted into the Rock and Roll Hall of Fame in 2000 as a member of the Lovin' Spoonful.

== Early life ==
Zalman Yanovsky was born on December 19, 1944 in Toronto, Ontario, Canada to Avrom Yanovsky, a Ukrainian-born political cartoonist and Nechama Yanovsky (née Germeil), a teacher of Polish heritage. As both parents were Jewish, Yanovsky attended Downsview Collegiate Institute in his teenage years.

== Musical career ==
Mostly self-taught, Yanovsky began his musical career playing folk music coffee houses in Toronto. He lived on a kibbutz in Israel for a short time before returning to Canada. He teamed with fellow Canadian Denny Doherty in the Halifax Three. The two joined Cass Elliot in the Mugwumps, a group mentioned by Doherty's and Cass's later group the Mamas & the Papas in the song "Creeque Alley".

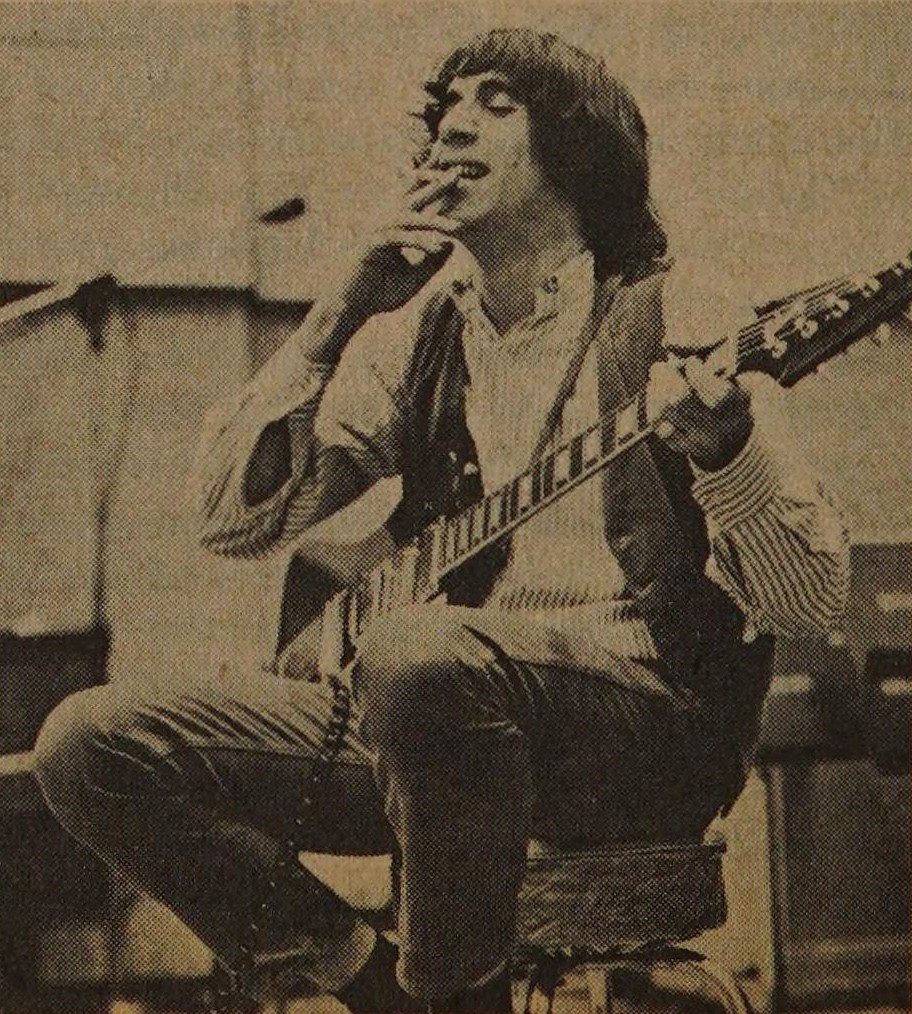
Yanovsky, August 1965

It was at this time that he met John Sebastian, and they formed the Lovin' Spoonful with Steve Boone and Joe Butler. According to Sebastian: "He could play like Elmore James, he could play like Floyd Cramer, he could play like Chuck Berry. He could play like all these people, yet he still had his own overpowering personality. Out of this we could, I thought, craft something with real flexibility." The Lovin' Spoonful had hits such as "Do You Believe in Magic", "Summer in the City", "Daydream", "Did You Ever Have to Make Up Your Mind?", "Darling Be Home Soon", and "You Didn't Have to Be So Nice". The group's only number one was "Summer In The City" (which stayed there for three weeks in August 1966).

In 1966, he was arrested in the United States on a marijuana-related charge.

In May 1967, Sebastian convened a meeting with Butler and Boone to discuss the Spoonful's future. Sebastian expressed frustration with Yanovsky's increasingly erratic public behavior and his derogatory treatment of his bandmates. Sebastian concluded that either Yanovsky should be fired, or else he was prepared to leave the band. Butler, who had never gotten along with Yanovsky and was increasingly the target of Yanovsky's insults, agreed with Sebastian. In a subsequent group meeting at Sebastian's apartment, the band informed Yanovsky that he had been fired. That June, rumors circulated that the band was breaking up. Yanovsky agreed to appear for the rest of the group's scheduled dates, and he last performed with the Spoonful on June 24, 1967, at the Forest Hills Music Festival in Queens, New York. Four days later, on June 28, Hit Parader magazine interviewed him to discuss what it termed his "uncertain future".

In September 1967, Yanovsky signed as a solo act with Buddah Records. Bob Cavallo, the Spoonful's manager, continued to manage Yanovsky. That same month, Buddah issued his debut single, "As Long As You're Here". The label's general manager, Neil Bogart, announced the single's initial pressing numbered 100,000 copies, and he promised a major promotional campaign would follow. Marty Thau, Buddah's pop music director, went on a four-city tour with Yanovsky, presenting the single to radio personnel at cocktail parties in Chicago, Detroit, Cleveland and Minneapolis. Billboard magazine's review panel predicted the single would reach at least the top 60 of the Hot 100 chart, but it failed to enter the chart and instead peaked at number 101 on Billboard's Bubbling Under the Hot 100 chart that October. The label announced in January 1968 that it had scheduled a second single for imminent release, but no single followed.

In late 1967, Yanovsky began recording his first solo album, Alive and Well in Argentina, which was released in June 1968. (Note: Marti Smiley Childs and Jeff March identify the release date as April 1968, but contemporary articles in Billboard and Cash Box magazines state that Buddah first introduced the album at their New York convention on June 8, 1968.) The album received little critical or commercial attention, but it spawned a partnership between Yanovsky and his replacement in the Spoonful, Jerry Yester, who produced the album. The two formed "Hair Shirt Productions", which produced recordings in Los Angeles for Pat Boone, Tim Buckley and the Fifth Avenue Band.

While a member of Kris Kristofferson's backing band at the Isle of Wight Festival 1970, he had a brief reunion with John Sebastian; Sebastian had been (apparently) unaware of Yanovsky's presence, and was made aware by a message passed through the crowd, written on a toilet roll.

He also appeared in the off-Broadway show National Lampoon's Lemmings at New York's Village Gate. Although not an original cast member, he contributed a musical number, "Nirvana Banana", a Donovan parody.

In 1980, he appeared in the movie One-Trick Pony and reunited with the Lovin' Spoonful. In 1996, Yanovsky was inducted into the Canadian Music Hall of Fame and performed. In 2000, he was inducted into the Rock and Roll Hall of Fame as a member of the Lovin' Spoonful, and performed alongside his former bandmates at the ceremony. The Hall of Fame performance was the last time Yanovsky performed live, and the last time the original line up of The Lovin' Spoonful performed together.

== Restaurateur ==
After retiring from the music business, Yanovsky became a chef and restaurateur with his second wife, Rose Richardson; together they opened Chez Piggy in 1979, and Pan Chancho Bakery in 1994, both in Kingston, Ontario. He had worked as a chef at The Golden Apple (in Gananoque, Ontario) and, in the mid-1970s, at Dr. Bull's (in Kingston). The success of Chez Piggy prompted the publication of a companion cookbook (The Chez Piggy Cookbook, Firefly Books, 1998) that was collected by fans. After Yanovsky's death in December 2002, and Richardson's death in 2005, his daughter Zoe Yanovsky (with actress Jackie Burroughs) took over the ownership of both eateries. Zoe also completed and launched another cookbook that Zal was working on, titled The Pan Chancho Cookbook (Bookmakers Press, 2006).

== Personal life ==
Yanovsky met Canadian actress Jackie Burroughs in 1961 in a laundromat in Toronto, where he was sleeping in a dryer while homeless. They were married in 1967 and had one daughter, Zoe, before separating in 1968. He subsequently married Rose Richardson. His step-mother was Anna Yanovsky (née Atanas), who died in 2022.

== Death ==
Yanovsky died on December 13, 2002, in Kingston, Ontario, from a heart attack, at the age of 57. A funeral service was held in Kingston, Ontario, on December 16, 2002.

== Discography ==
=== Singles ===
List of singles, with selected chart positions
Year	Single details	Peak chart positions		
Year	Single details	US Billboard	US Cash Box	CAN
1967	"As Long as You're Here" b/w "Ereh Er'ouy Sa Gnol Sa": Released: September 1967; Label: Buddha (BDA 12)	101 (Note: The single did not enter the Hot 100, but instead peaked on Billboard's Bubbling Under the Hot 100 chart.)	63	57

=== Albums ===
Year	Album details
1968	Alive and Well in Argentina: Released: June 8, 1968; Label: Buddha (BDS-5019)

== See also ==
- Canadian rock
- Music of Canada

== Sources ==
- Boone, Steve; Moss, Tony (2014). Hotter Than a Match Head: My Life on the Run with The Lovin' Spoonful. Toronto: ECW Press. ISBN 978-1-77041-193-7 – via the Internet Archive.
- Childs, Marti Smiley; March, Jeff (1999). Echoes of the Sixties. New York City: Billboard Books. p. 222. ISBN 978-0-8230-8316-9 – via Google Books.
- Rees, Dafydd; Crampton, Luke (1991). Rock Movers & Shakers. New York City: Billboard Books. ISBN 978-0-8230-7609-3 – via the Internet Archive.
- Unterberger, Richie (2003). Eight Miles High: Folk-Rock's Flight from Haight-Ashbury to Woodstock. San Francisco: Backbeat Books. ISBN 0-87930-743-9.
