= Erik Jacobsen =

American record producer, song publisher, and artist manager

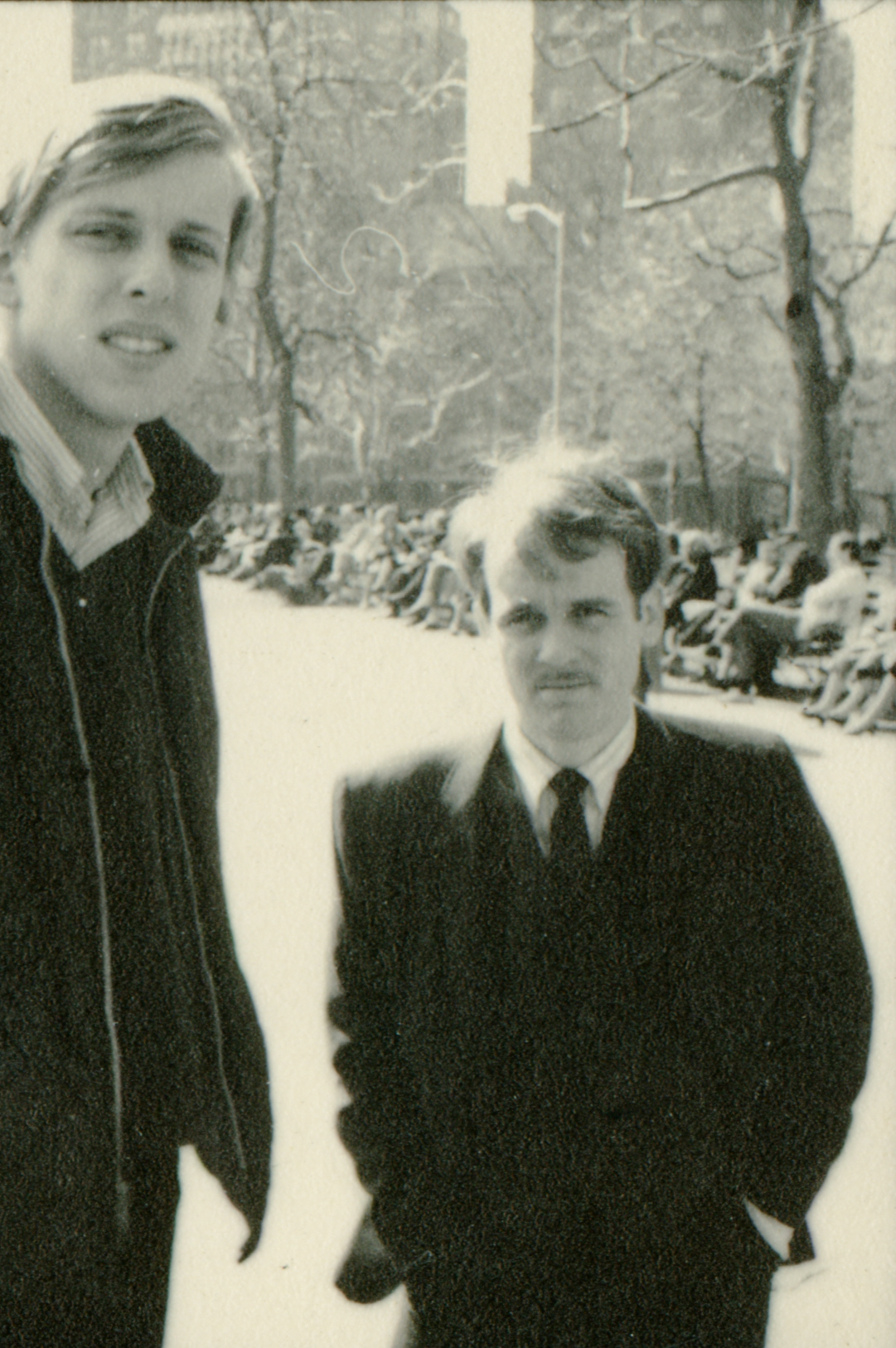
- Jacobsen (left) with Tim Hardin in Washington Square

Background information
- Born: May 19, 1940 (age 86); Oak Park, Illinois
- Occupation: Record producer
- Instruments: Guitar, banjo, tuba, sousaphone
- Years active: 1960s–present
- Labels: Columbia Records; Kama Sutra

Erik Jacobsen (born May 19, 1940) is an American record producer, song publisher and artist manager. He is best known for his work in the 1960s with Tim Hardin, the Lovin' Spoonful, the Charlatans, and Sopwith Camel, and later with Norman Greenbaum, Tazmanian Devils and Chris Isaak. Retiring after forty years in the studio, he began working in video production. His first major video project was an auto-biographical webside, All About Erik, launched in 2019. His next, Erik's Travels, features his prize-winning travel documentaries, and was launched in 2024.

== Early life ==
Jacobsen was born in Oak Park, Illinois, on the west side of Chicago. His early musical influences were wide-ranging, including a unique opportunity to listen to the first urban radio stations broadcasting polka, blues and country.

== Musician ==
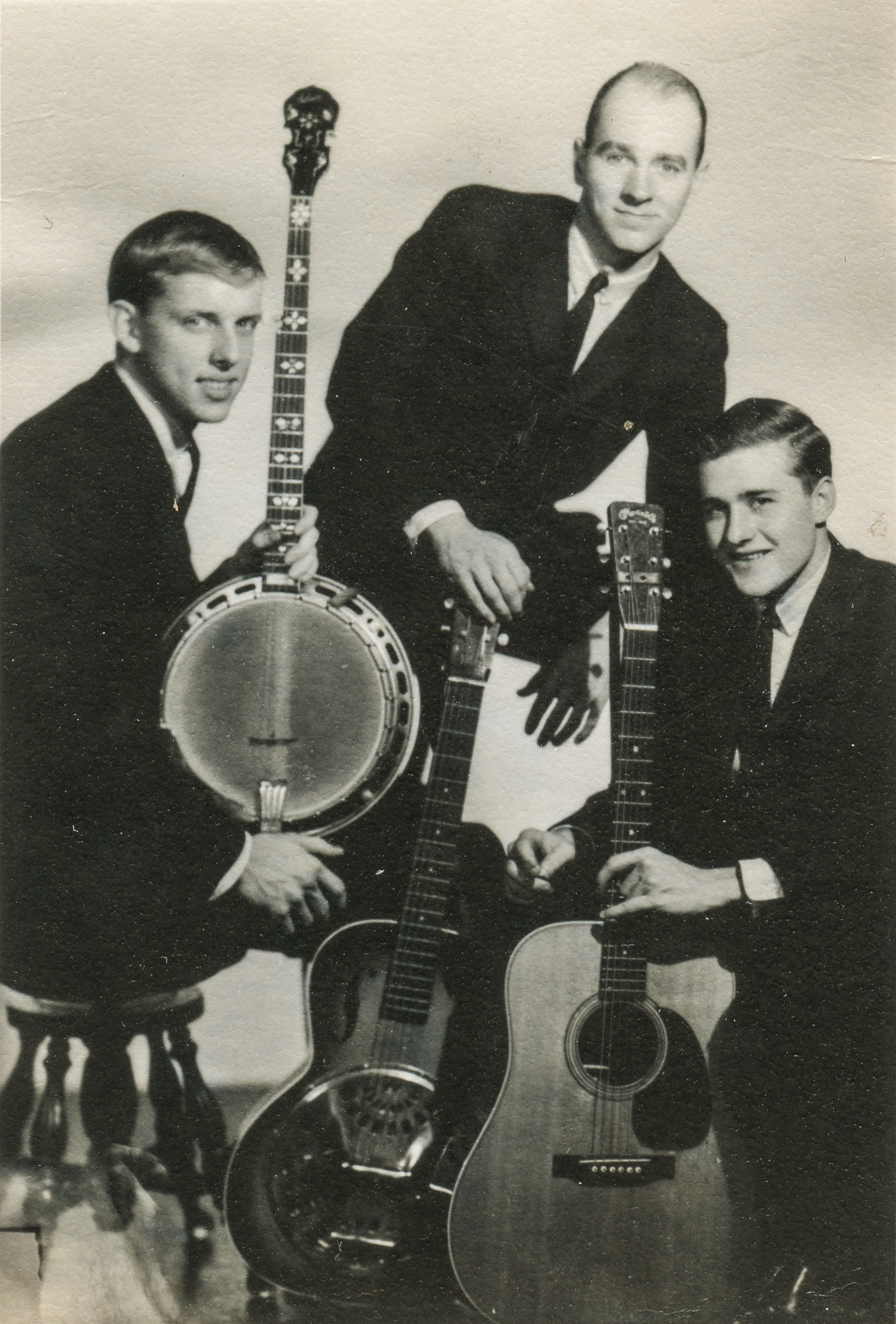
Jacobsen (left) with Knob Lick Upper 10,000, 1963

In high school Jacobsen played the tuba and sousaphone. Later, at Oberlin College he began playing bluegrass style banjo and by his senior year, took over leadership of the Oberlin bluegrass band, the Plumb Creek Boys. After graduation in 1962, he formed the Knob Lick Upper 10,000, with Dwain Story and Pete Childs, also Oberlin graduates. They performed at The Bitter End coffee house in New York City, where they were signed by manager Albert Grossman. They recorded two albums for Mercury Records, Introducing The Knob Lick Upper 10,000 (1962), and Work Out!!! (1963), and were among the first folk and bluegrass artists to play Carnegie Hall.

In 1964, after hearing the Beatles, Jacobsen quit the Knob Lick Upper 10,000, intending to produce records that combined folk music with electric instruments and drums. Returning to New York, he soon met John Sebastian, who had similar ideas, and they began working with other musicians, including Jerry Yester, Zal Yanovsky, Jesse Colin Young, Cass Elliot, and Denny Doherty. Jacobsen produced various demos for different combinations of these musicians, prototypes of the folk rock style.

== The Lovin' Spoonful ==
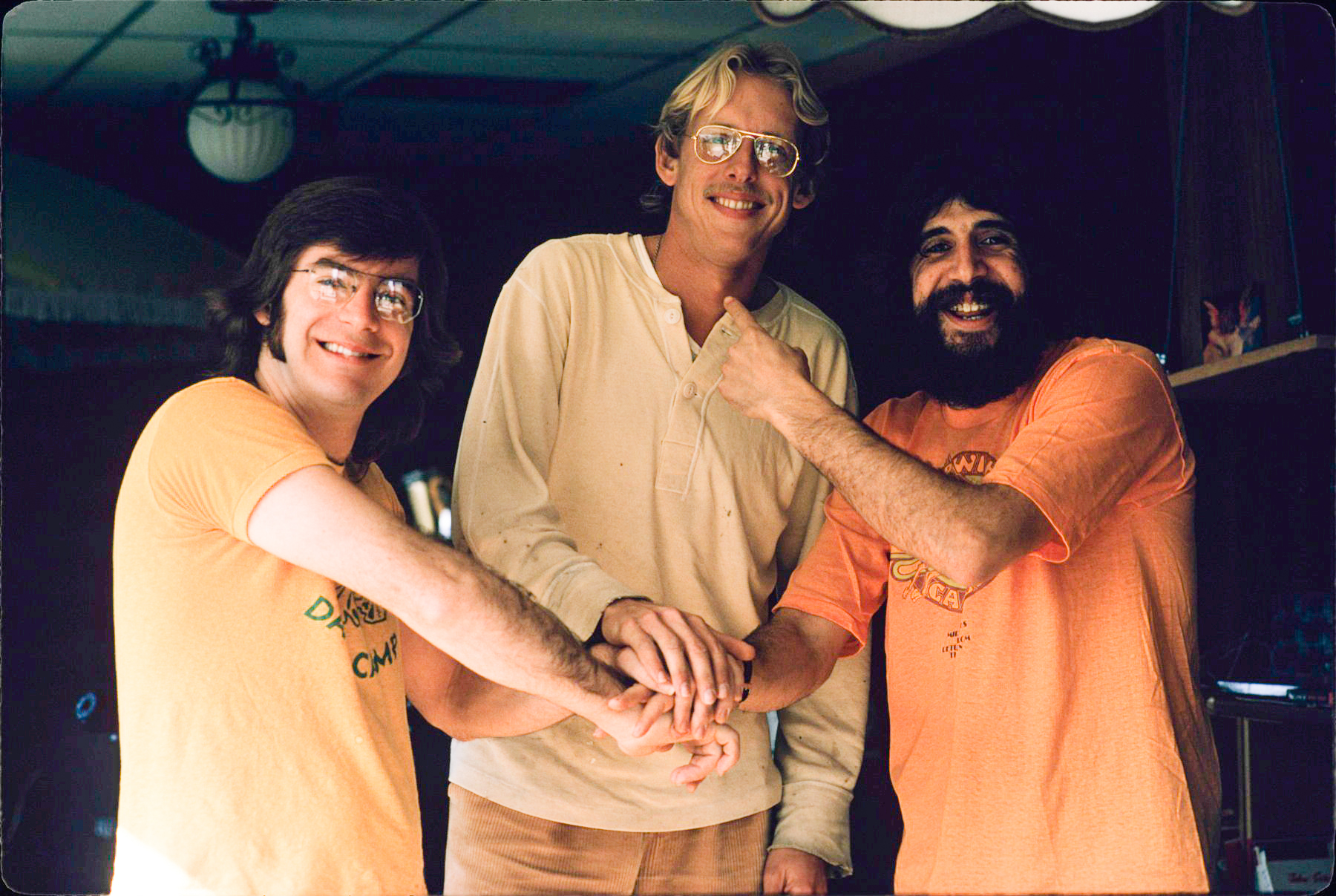
Jacobsen (center) with John Sebastian (left) and Zal Yanovsky (right) in 1974

Starting in 1965, Jacobsen, John Sebastian, and Yanovsky created the group The Lovin' Spoonful. Jacobsen produced the albums Do You Believe in Magic, Daydream, and Hums of the Lovin' Spoonful, which yielded seven straight top-10 singles, including "Do You Believe in Magic", "You Didn't Have to Be So Nice", "Daydream", and the number one hit, "Summer in the City", which was subsequently voted the number one summertime single of the 20th century by Billboard Magazine. The Lovin’ Spoonful also recorded soundtracks for Woody Allen's first movie What’s Up Tiger Lily as well as Francis Ford Coppola's You're a Big Boy Now. Jacobsen published the band's original songs through his Faithful Virtue Publishing Company and was a major factor in their development. Sebastian has said, "I felt like Erik, just as a collaborator, was a fifth member of the Spoonful."

== Tim Hardin ==
Jacobsen discovered singer-songwriter Tim Hardin in 1964, managed him, and produced his first album, Tim Hardin 1. The album includes modern classics like "Reason to Believe", "Misty Roses", "Don't Make Promises", and "How Can We Hang on to a Dream". To encourage Hardin to write original songs, Jacobsen bought him a tape recorder and paid him $50 for every song Hardin recorded that had at least two verses and a chorus. Songs that Hardin later recorded as demos for Jacobsen also include "If I Were a Carpenter" and others that appeared on Tim Hardin 2. In 1964, Jacobsen also recorded the original blues-style recordings that were eventually released as Tim Hardin 4 on Verve Records.

== Other artists ==
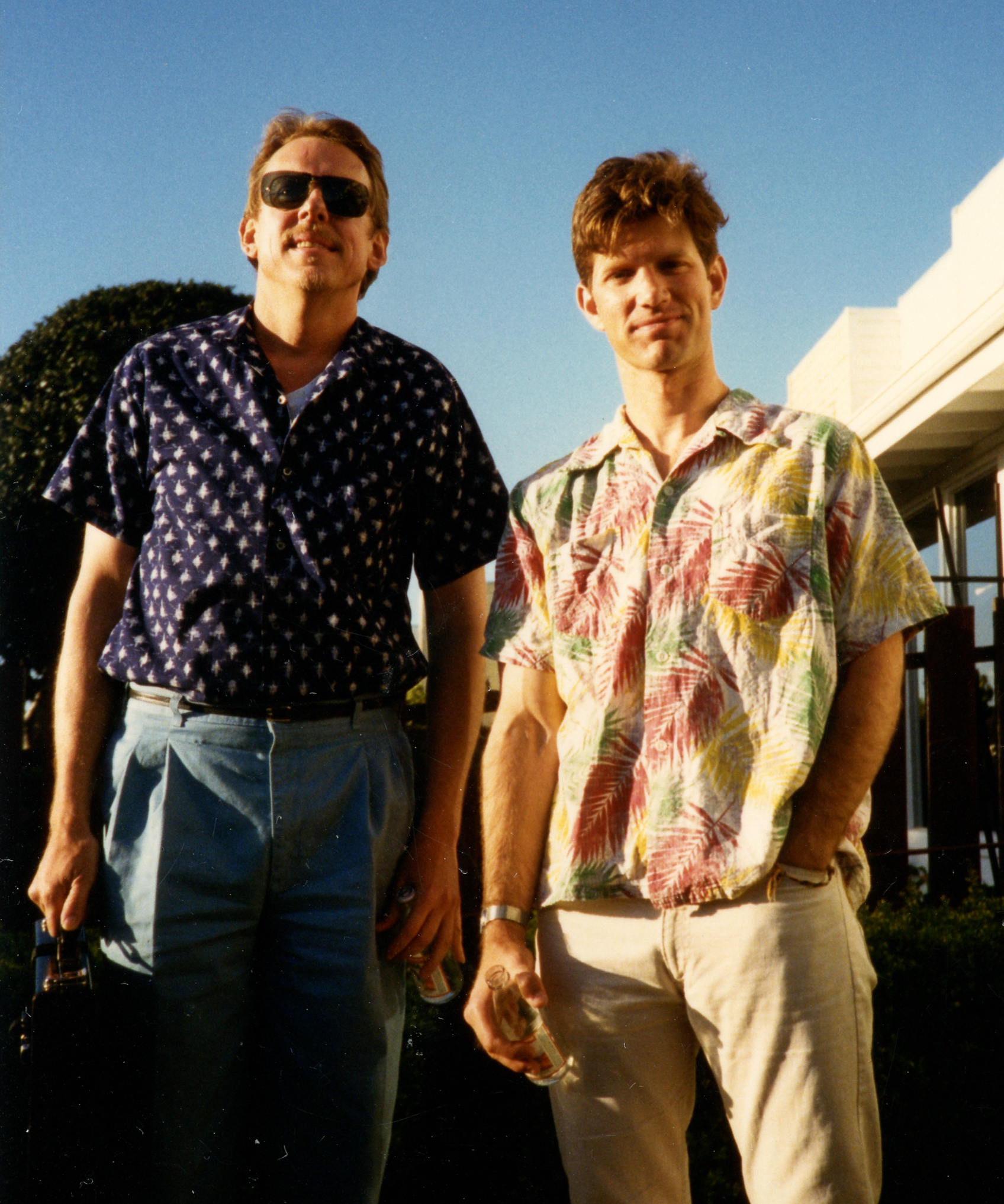
Jacobsen (left) with Chris Isaak in 1998.

Jacobsen expanded his search for talent to California and worked there with the first of the newly emerging San Francisco rock bands, The Charlatans. While having little recording success, the band served as a launching pad for the songwriter and singer Dan Hicks, composer of the iconic song "I Scare Myself," among many others.

In 1966, Jacobsen recorded the group Sopwith Camel. Their song "Hello Hello" was the first pop hit to come out of San Francisco's psychedelic era. He went on to produce their 1973 cult classic, The Miraculous Hump Returns from the Moon.

In 1968, he began working with Norman Greenbaum. They made three albums together, and Jacobsen produced Greenbaum's "Spirit in the Sky", which became a number one worldwide hit and went on to be one of the most licensed recordings of all time, appearing in many TV shows, films, and commercials.

In 1969, Jacobsen produced and published the song "Mill Valley", a number one Adult Contemporary hit for Rita Abrams, a kindergarten school teacher, singing with the Strawberry Point School Third Grade Class. They were featured on the cover of Life magazine and were guests on The Smothers Brothers TV show. A young Francis Ford Coppola made a video for the song.

In 1975, Jacobsen began working with singer/songwriter Brian Elliot. One album was released by Warner Brothers Records. In 1986 the Elliot/Jacobsen Publishing Company had Elliot's song "Papa Don't Preach" covered by Madonna. Her record went on to become an international number one hit, selling over one hundred million copies.

In 1980–1984, he produced two albums with the San Francisco ska- and reggae-oriented band Tazmanian Devils on Warner Brothers Records.

In 1981, he teamed up with Chris Isaak as Isaak's producer, publisher, and manager. They worked together through 1998, making seven albums, including the double platinum album Heart Shaped World. The breakthrough single, "Wicked Game", was made into a music video, which has been voted one of MTV's sexiest videos of all time. Isaak's music has also been featured in numerous movies, TV shows, and advertisements.

As a videographer, his work on All About Erik and Erik's Travels have been recognized and awarded laurels by numerous film festivals worldwide.

== Song publisher ==
Jacobsen's song publishing credits include, among others:

- Lovin' Spoonful and Tim Hardin published by Faithful Virtue Music Company
- Sopwith Camel and Norman Greenbaum published by Great Honesty Music
- Chris Isaak published by C. Isaak Music Publishing Co.
- Brian Elliot through Elliot/Jacobsen Music Publishing Co.
- Dan Hicks and Rita Abrams published by Oh Boy Music Publishing Company

== Discography ==
- Knob Lick Upper 10,000: The Introduction Of Knob Lick Upper 10,000 (1963, Banjo)
- Knob Lick Upper 10,000: Workout!!! (1963, Banjo)
- Lovin' Spoonful: Do You Believe in Magic (1965, Producer)
- Lovin' Spoonful: Daydream (1966, Producer)
- Lovin' Spoonful: Hums of the Lovin' Spoonful (1966, Producer)
- Lovin' Spoonful: What's Up Tiger Lily? (soundtrack) (1966, Producer)
- Tim Hardin: Tim Hardin 1 (1966, Producer)
- The Charlatans: "The Shadow Knows" (1966, Producer)
- Lovin' Spoonful: You're A Big Boy Now (soundtrack) (1967, Producer)
- Sopwith Camel: Sopwith Camel (1967, Producer)
- Leonard Schaeffer: A Boy & His Dog (1968, Producer)
- Tim Hardin: Tim Hardin 4 (1969, Producer)
- Norman Greenbaum: Spirit in the Sky (1969, Producer)
- Blue Velvet Band: Sweet Moments with the Blue Velvet Band (1969, Producer)
- Norman Greenbaum: Back Home Again (1970, Producer)
- The Stovall Sisters: The Stovall Sisters (1970, Producer)
- Miss Abrams and the Strawberry Point 3rd Grade Class: "Mill Valley" (1970, Producer)
- William Truckaway: Breakaway (1971, Producer)
- Norman Greenbaum: Petaluma (1972, Producer)
- Miss Abrams and the Strawberry Point 4th Grade Class: Miss Abrams and the Strawberry Point 4th Grade Class (1972, Producer)
- Sopwith Camel: The Miraculous Hump Returns from the Moon (1973, Producer)
- Indigo: Indigo (1977, Producer)
- Brian Elliot: Brian Elliot (1978, Producer)
- The Tazmanian Devils: "The Tazmanian Devils" (1980 Producer)
- The Tazmanian Devils: "Broadway High Life" (1981 Producer)
- Chris Isaak: Silvertone (1985, Producer)
- Chris Isaak: Chris Isaak (1986, Producer)
- Chris Isaak: Heart Shaped World (1989, Producer)
- Chris Isaak: "Wicked Game" (1991, Producer)
- Chris Isaak: San Francisco Days (1993, Producer)
- Chris Isaak: Forever Blue (1995, Producer)
- Chris Isaak: Baja Sessions (1996, Producer)
- Chris Isaak: Speak of the Devil (1998, Producer)
- Chris Isaak: Best of Chris Isaak (2006, Producer)
- Brian Elliot: Full Mental Nudity (2014, Producer)
