= Pye International Records =

Pye International Records was a record label founded in 1958, as a subsidiary of Pye Records. The company distributed many American labels in the UK, including Chess, King, Colpix, and other labels. It was dissolved in 1979.

There was also an American label of the same name, which was later reorganized in the US as Prelude Records in 1976.

== Appearance ==
The first labels were blue, modelled on the magenta Pye-Nixa (later Pye) label. During its heyday, around 1961–64, it was red and yellow; later on it was pinkish violet, matching the Pye and Piccadilly labels of the time.

== R&B series ==
Around 1964, some records featured the legend "R&B" on the central spindle, to reflect the popularity of rhythm and blues at the time, in the wake of British acts like the Rolling Stones being influenced by blues music. The letters especially featured on records licensed from the Chess and Checker labels: Chuck Berry, Bo Diddley, Howlin' Wolf, Muddy Waters, etc.

== See also ==
- Lists of record labels
- Pye Records
