= Bell Sound Studios =

Recording studio in New York City, United States

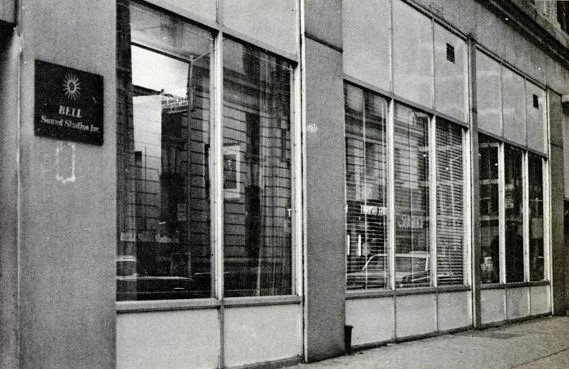
The studios' second iteration, at 237 West 54th Street, Manhattan, c. 1968

Bell Sound Studios was an independent recording studio in New York City from 1950 to 1976. At its height, the studio was the largest independent recording studio in the United States, and the site of recording sessions that produced seminal hits by Jimmie Rodgers, Frankie Lymon & the Teenagers, Dionne Warwick, the McGuire Sisters, the Flamingos, Dion and the Belmonts, Paul Anka, Frankie Avalon, the Drifters and Ben E. King, the Four Seasons, Lesley Gore, the Dixie Cups, the Everly Brothers, Buddy Holly, The Capris, and Kiss.

== History ==
=== Early years ===
Co-founders Allen Weintraub and Dan Cronin were classmates at Brooklyn Technical High School and aspiring radio engineers. In June 1950 with an initial investment of $600 Weintraub and Cronin established the recording studio as Bell Recording Co. in a storefront at 73 Mott Street in New York's Chinatown. The studios were initially used for recording radio airchecks and weddings and bar mitzvahs.

Within a year the studio had outgrown its initial location and was moved to Brooklyn, where it began picking up overflow business from record labels when more established New York studios were fully booked. On March 30, 1953 record producer George Goldner brought doo-wop act the Crows to Bell to record "Gee" with Weintraub engineering. The song became the studio's first hit, reaching number 1 on the R&B chart and 14 on the pop chart.

=== The 1950s ===
Needing a larger studio space to accommodate recording sessions of these small ensembles, Bell moved to West 89th Street in Manhattan. It was at this location that Faye Adams recorded her hit song "Shake a Hand". The song, produced by Al Silver, marked the transition between Gospel and Rhythm & Blues and held the number one position on the U.S. Billboard R&B chart for nine weeks. In November 1955, George Goldner was back with Frankie Lymon & the Teenagers to record "Why do Fools Fall in Love". The single reached number 1 on the R&B chart and number 6 on the pop chart, and increased the studio's notoriety. In 1955, then known as Bell Sound Studios, the company and its nine employees relocated yet again, to the fourth floor of a building at West 46th Street and 8th Avenue in the heart of Midtown Manhattan and near New York's advertising agencies, record labels, other recording studios, and the Brill Building, whose songwriters and producers gravitated to Bell Sound Studios for their sessions. In 1956, Jimmie Rodgers recorded his version of "Honeycomb (song)" at the studio, with the song topping the Billboard Top 100.

By 1957 the company had grown to 17 employees, and again moved, to 237 West 54th Street, where the studios eventually occupied the largest portion of a five-story building. While the major record labels initially used their own recording studios exclusively, even major record labels were utilizing Bell Sound Studios by 1957. On November 13, 1957, Coral Records president Bob Thiele booked the studio for The McGuire Sisters to record "Sugartime" with a 16-piece band. He appreciated Bell's innovative isolation capabilities to record the rhythm as he heard it and was amazed by the unusual clarity of each musical element. The song topped the Most Played chart in February 1958. Buddy Knox recorded his 1957 number 17 hit "Rock Your Little Baby To Sleep" at Bell, and Jimmy Bowen recorded three singles (including "Warm Up to Me Baby") at the studio in May. In April 1957 Dion and the Belmonts entered the studio to record "I Wonder Why" (April 1958) and their hit "A Teenager in Love" (April 1959). The Monotones recorded their doo-wop classic "The Book of Love" at Bell in September 1957. Clint Miller recorded "Bertha Lou" here in November/December 1957. The Chantels arrived at Bell Sound on October 16, 1957, to have Richard Barrett produce their first big hit, "Maybe".

Paul Anka was a regular customer at Bell Sound under the direction of producer Don Costa, beginning in September 1957 with the recording of "I Love You Baby" and "You Are My Destiny". Anka recorded almost exclusively at Bell Sound until 1961, including such hits as "Put Your Head on My Shoulder", "Lonely Boy", and "Puppy Love". Cannonball Adderley recorded at Bell Sound, starting with Cannonball's Sharpshooters in 1958.

Buddy Holly, who normally recorded at Norman Petty's Clovis, New Mexico studio, recorded his rock & roll classic "Rave On" at Bell Sound on January 25, 1958, backed by his band and Petty (on piano). In May of that year, Little Anthony and the Imperials recorded their hit "Tears on My Pillow". That October, George Goldner produced the Flamingos' doo-wop classic "I Only Have Eyes for You" in a three-hour recording session without overdubbing. Also in 1958, Lloyd Price recorded "Stagger Lee" and "Where Were You on our Wedding Day" at the studio, and returned the following year to record "Lady Luck", "I'm Gonna Get Married", and his Don Costa-produced single "Personality", which reached #2 on the pop charts. The Capris recorded "There's a Moon Out Tonight" at the studio in December 1958; the song would become the group's biggest hit in 1961 upon its re-release.

Frankie Avalon recorded two number one hits at Bell Sound in 1959: "Venus" and "Why". Wilbert Harrison recorded his hit single "Kansas City" at Bell on February 25, 1959, accompanied by Ike Turner on the piano, among others. The big hit was created in less than 30 minutes and cost a mere $40 to record. Ronnie Hawkins recorded his eponymous LP at the studio in April 1959, including the single "Forty Days", and in June, manager Harry Balk brought his instrumental band Johnny and the Hurricanes to Bell Sound to record "Red River Rock". Fabian was also in the studio in June, recording Tiger, which would become his biggest hit. In December 1959, Ben E. King and the Drifters recorded "This Magic Moment" and "Save the Last Dance for Me" at the studio in the late 1950s. The latter, released a few months after Ben E. King's departure from the group, became the band's biggest hit. In December 1959, the Everly Brothers' first recording session outside of Nashville produced "Let It Be Me" at the studio.

=== The 1960s ===
After moving from Decca to Warner Brothers, Bill Haley & His Comets went to Bell Sound in January, 1960 and recorded material for their first Warner LP, Bill Haley and His Comets. Paul Anka returned in April of the same year to record "My Home Town". Ben E. King's second solo session at Bell Sound on October 27, 1960, spawned his first solo hit, "Spanish Harlem", and a March 27, 1961 recording session produced his classic song "Stand by Me". Ferrante & Teicher, both Juilliard alumni and faculty, had their two grand pianos hoisted into the studio, where they were recorded with full orchestra for the duo's hit instrumentals "Theme from The Apartment" (July 1960) and "Exodus" (November 1960).

Dion returned to Bell Sound as a solo artist in 1961 and recorded "Runaround Sue", the song for which he would be inducted into the Grammy Hall of Fame in 2002. The Drifters also returned to the studios beginning in 1961 to record "Some Kind of Wonderful", "Please Stay", "Sweets for My Sweet" and "Room Full of Tears". Subsequent Drifters sessions at Bell Sound in the years to follow would produce "Up on The Roof" (June 1962) and "On Broadway" (January 1963).

On July 13, 1961, while performing as a background singer on the Drifters' song "Mexican Divorce", Dionne Warwick was discovered by producer and composer Burt Bacharach, the beginning of one of the most successful teams in popular music history. Warwick recorded her debut solo single, "Don't Make Me Over", at Bell Sound in August 1962, and the singer and her songwriting team returned to record many more hits, including "Walk On By" (1964) and "Do You Know the Way to San Jose" (1967).

In December 1961, Solomon Burke recorded one of his best-known songs, "Cry to Me" at the studio, produced by Bert Berns. In May 1962, Berns was back at Bell Sound assisting Luther Dixon on a recording session with new Wand Records signees the Isley Brothers as they tried, unsuccessfully, to record "Make It Easy on Yourself". In an attempt to salvage the session, Berns suggested the group should record a new version of his song, "Twist and Shout", after the first recording of the song, released by the Top Notes, failed commercially the previous year. The song became the Isley Brothers' first single to reach the Top 20 on the Billboard Hot 100 singles chart.

Another Luther Dixon-produced group, the Shirelles, recorded several hits at Bell Sound, including "Will You Love Me Tomorrow" (November 1960), "Baby It's You" (1961), "Mama Said" (April 1961), and "Soldier Boy" (March 1962). Del Shannon recorded his biggest hit, "Runaway" at the studio in January 1961, and returned to Bell Sound to record "Hats Off to Larry" (May 1961) and "Little Town Flirt" (November, 1962).

Gene Pitney began his studio career at Bell Sound with "(I Wanna) Love My Life Away" (January 1961) and "Every Breath I Take" (August 1961). More ballads followed with "Town Without Pity" (October 1961), "Only Love Can Break a Heart" (September 1962), and "It Hurts to Be in Love" (July 1964).

Other studio customers included the Four Seasons, who recorded their hit "Big Girls Don't Cry" at the studio in October 1962, and Wilson Pickett, who recorded "It's Too Late" there in August 1963. Lesley Gore recorded her hit song "It's My Party" in March 1963, as well as its follow-up, "Judy's Turn to Cry" that May, and "You Don't Own Me" that December. Phil Ramone - himself a studio operator - acted under producer Quincy Jones to engineer Gore's vocal overdubs for the recordings. Other songs recorded at Bell Sound include Garnet Mimms' "Cry Baby" (May 1963), the Dixie Cups' number one hit "Chapel of Love" (May 1964), and "Gloria" by Them with Van Morrison (May 1965). Len Barry had all his hits produced at Bell Sound, including "1-2-3" (June 1965).

In 1965, the McCoys recorded their hit song "Hang On Sloopy" at Bell Sound. The same year, after renewed interest in the band's 1964 regional release of "Hanky Panky", Tommy James, backed by a freshly-recruited quintet that would serve as his new Shondells, re-recorded a new version of the song and its eponymous LP at the studio. Notable songs recorded at the studios in 1966 included the Bobby Hebb song "Sunny" and Mitch Ryder and the Detroit Wheels' song "Devil with a Blue Dress On".

In 1961, the studio hired 15-year recording industry veteran Irv Jerome, who grew the studios' business recording commercials for radio and television, including work for Madison Avenue firms like Ted Bates, J. Walter Thompson, BBD&O, Benton & Bowles, Young & Rubicam, Ogilvy & Mather, and produced ads for Pepsi, Coke, Ford, and Barneys. Bell Sound would eventually be utilized by nearly every Madison Avenue advertising agency, with this business becoming 35-40% of the studio's annual revenue by 1968.

In 1965, when the company expanded into high-speed tape duplication services with its A&B Duplicators, Ltd. subsidiary, Bell Sound managers did not find equipment that offered the features and flexibility the company required, so Bell Sound developed their own tape duplication machines, which the company marketed and sold under the Electro Sound brand beginning in 1966. The studio's research and development team developed an innovative 12-track 2-inch tape recorder that offered higher-quality recording than the 8-track 1-inch and 16-track 2-inch recorders in use at other studios. Early adoption of 12-track 2-inch technology introduced an incompatibility with other studios, as this was a one of a kind device.

In January 1968, co-owner Don Cronin died in a plane crash. In November of that year, faced with rising rent and other financial challenges, Weintraub sold Bell Sound Studios and its affiliates to Viewlex, a Long Island music and entertainment conglomerate that purchased a controlling interest in the Kama Sutra and Buddah Records labels.

=== The 1970s ===
Business at the studio without Cronin and under new ownership began to wane. The Flamin' Groovies recorded their LP Teenage Head in January 1971, and Roberta Flack recorded "Feel Like Makin' Love" at the studio in June 1973. On October 10 of that year, rock band Kiss began recording their debut album, Kiss. The following year, the recording studio began to experience financial difficulties. Bell Sound Recording Studios finally ceased operations in 1976, and the company filed Chapter 11 bankruptcy in 1977.

== Facilities ==
Bell Sound Studios' 237 West 54th Street facilities eventually grew to include 60 employees, three studios, four editing rooms, five mastering rooms, and a film room. It was one of the first studios to allow engineers to specialize in mixing, and could be requested by a client.

Studio A was the largest of Bell's three studios, located on the top floor and capable of recording full orchestras. Studio B was slightly smaller than Studio A, it could accommodate about 20 to 25 musicians and had a small vocal booth. Studio C could accommodate up to ten people and was used for the production of demo recordings, while Studio D was used for quadraphonic and later voice-over recordings. Studio B and C were located next to each other on the second floor, with the mixing and mastering rooms between the two recording rooms.

As Bell Sound's technical director, Cronin designed the first automatic width and depth control for stereo disc mastering, and Bell Sound provided mastering and disc cutting services for songs and albums recorded elsewhere, as it did for Ray Charles' album Modern Sounds in Country and Western Music Volume Two (September 1962).

Cronin also designed an early magnetic tape noise reduction system, as well as the first solid-state professional recording console in the late 1950s, when vacuum tube consoles were the norm.

== Legacy ==
In 1981, The Hit Factory relocated to Bell Sound Studios former location to establish The Hit Factory Broadway, which remained in operation until 2002.

Bell Sound Recording Studios had no legal relationship with the New York independent record label Bell Records founded by Benny Bell in 1945, and is in no way related to Bell Sound Studios in Hollywood, founded by Bill Bell in 1965.
