= The Lovin' Spoonful discography =

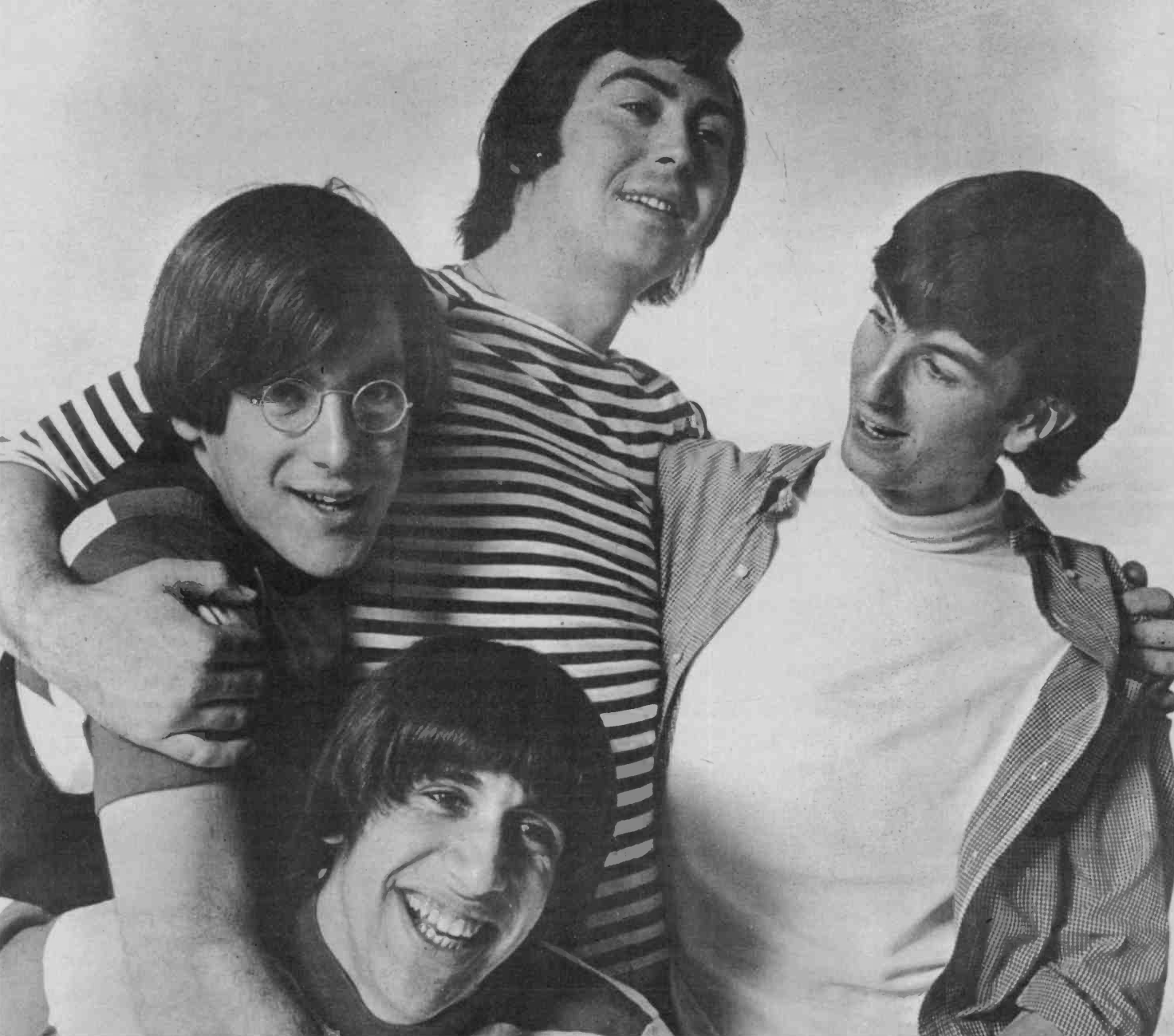
- The Lovin' Spoonful in 1965
- Studio albums: 5
- EPs: 8
- Live albums: 1
- Compilation albums: 21
- Singles: 19
- Soundtrack albums: 2

The Lovin' Spoonful is a Canadian-American folk-rock band which was originally active between 1964 and 1968. During their original tenure, they released five studio albums, two soundtrack albums, four compilation albums, and fourteen singles in the United States. Between October 1965 and January 1967, their first seven singles reached the Top Ten in the United States on Billboard magazine's Hot 100 chart, and the magazine's 1966 end-of-year issue ranked the group as that year's third-best-performing singles artist, after the Beatles and the Rolling Stones. (Note: Three of the Lovin' Spoonful's singles that year – "Daydream", "Did You Ever Have to Make Up Your Mind?" and "Summer in the City" – appeared on Billboard's list of the top records of the year. The only other groups to have at least three singles on the list were the Beach Boys (three), Paul Revere & the Raiders (three) and the Beatles (four).) Though the Spoonful achieved success during the transition to the album era, they and their label remained focused on the singles market; the group's 1966 album Daydream was their only studio album to break the Top Ten of the Billboard Top LPs chart, and its performance was bested only by a 1967 compilation album, The Best of the Lovin' Spoonful, which RIAA certified for gold that year. The Spoonful saw diminished success in 1967, when only two of their singles entered the top twenty in the US. Following further chart disappointments, the group disbanded in 1968. (Note: Joe Butler, Steve Boone and Jerry Yester began touring under the name the Lovin' Spoonful in 1991, a venture opposed by both John Sebastian and Zal Yanovsky. Augmented by a group of touring musicians, the group released a live album, Live at the Hotel Seville, in 1999.)

The Lovin' Spoonful's albums and singles were originally issued by Kama Sutra Records in the United States and by Pye International Records in the United Kingdom. The band was not directly signed to Kama Sutra but was instead signed to Koppelman-Rubin, an entertainment company, which negotiated a deal with the label in June 1965. As part of the arrangement, MGM Records distributed the records, which Kama Sutra released on its label for Koppelman-Rubin. (Note: Around the time of the agreement with Kama Sutra, the Spoonful came to a side-deal with Elektra Records. The deal saw the band record four songs for the label, all of which later appeared on What's Shakin', a 1966 compilation album.) MGM's contract with Kama Sutra expired in 1967, and Kama Sutra's leadership founded Buddah Records (later renamed Buddha), transferring their five-year deal with the Spoonful in the process. The band's new contract ran until 1975 and had their compensation at seven figures. (Note: MGM and Kama Sutra's renegotiated deal added a "key-man clause" which specified that the Spoonful would only exist if Sebastian was a member. After he left the band in 1968 and recorded his debut solo album, MGM initially sought to release the album under the Spoonful's name.)

John Sebastian, the Spoonful's primary songwriter, originally published his compositions with Faithful Virtue Music, a publishing company owned by Charles Koppelman and Don Rubin. In 2023, Sebastian sold the publishing and artist royalties rights for all of his compositions to AMR Songs, an American catalog marketing company.

The Lovin' Spoonful's music has been regularly collected on compilation albums. In the years after the band's breakup, many of their original multi-track master-tapes were lost and presumed destroyed. (Note: Among the lost tapes are eight-track outtakes which were rendered unplayable after they sunk aboard Boone's studio-boat in Baltimore's Inner Harbor in 1977.) The group's earliest CD reissues were instead made from the best available stereo masters, leaving the material sounding substandard when compared to reissues of other 1960s music. In 2000, after the first-generation master-tapes were rediscovered, Buddha issued Greatest Hits, which was the first digital remaster of the band's material. BMG Heritage Records, a reissue division of Sony BMG, issued digital remasters of the band's first four studio albums on CD in 2002 and 2003, along with previously unreleased bonus material.

== Albums ==
=== Studio albums ===
List of studio albums with selected chart positions
Year	Title	Album details		Peak chart positions				
Year	Title	US release	UK release	US	CAN (Note: RPM published its first Top LPs chart on January 2, 1967.)	FIN	NOR (Note: VG-lista published its first album chart on January 1, 1967.)	UK
1965	Do You Believe in Magic	Released: October 23, 1965; Label: Kama Sutra (KLP/KLPS-8050)	Released March 1966; Label: Pye International Records (NPL.28069)	32	×	—	×	—
1966	Daydream	Released: March 1966; Label: Kama Sutra (KLP/KLPS-8051)	Released: April 29, 1966; Label: Pye International Records (NPL.28078)	10	×	9	×	8
1966	Hums of the Lovin' Spoonful	Released: November 1966; Label: Kama Sutra (KLP/KLPS-8054)	Released: January 27, 1967; Label: Kama Sutra (KLP 401)	14	8	—	9	—
1967	Everything Playing	Released: December 6, 1967; Label: Kama Sutra (KLP/KLPS-8061)	Released: April 5, 1968; Label: Kama Sutra (KLP 404)	118	—	—	—	—
1968	Revelation: Revolution '69 (Note: Revelation: Revolution '69 is credited to "The Lovin' Spoonful featuring Joe Butler", but it only includes Butler playing with session musicians. Later authors therefore generally omit the album when listing the band's discography.)	Released: October 7, 1968; Label: Kama Sutra (KLPS-8073)	Released: June 1969; Label: Kama Sutra (620 009)	—	—	—	—	—
"—" denotes releases that did not chart or were not released in that territory. "×" denotes the chart did not exist yet.

=== Soundtrack albums ===
List of soundtrack albums with selected chart positions
Year	Title	Album details		Peak chart positions
Year	Title	US release	UK release	US
1966	What's Up, Tiger Lily?	Released: August 1966; Label: Kama Sutra (KLP/KLPS-8053)	—	126
1967	You're a Big Boy Now	Released: March 1967; Label: Kama Sutra (KLP/KLPS-8058)	Released: May 1967; Label: Kama Sutra (KLP 402)	160
"—" denotes releases that were not released in that territory.

=== Live albums ===
List of live albums
Year	Title	Album details
1999	Live at the Hotel Seville	Released: 1999; Label: Varèse Sarabande (302 065 995 2)

=== Compilation albums ===
List of compilation albums with selected chart positions and certifications
Decade	Title	Album details	Peak chart positions		Certifications (sales thresholds)
Decade	Title	Album details	US	CAN	Certifications (sales thresholds)
1960s	What's Shakin' (Note: What's Shakin' is a compilation of various Elektra performers from the mid-1960s. The Lovin' Spoonful account for four of the 14 tracks.)	Released: May 1966; Label: Elektra (EKL/EKS-4002)	—	—	
1960s	The Best of the Lovin' Spoonful	Released: February 1967; Label: Kama Sutra (KLP/KLPS-8056)	3	3	RIAA: Gold
1960s	The Best of the Lovin' Spoonful Volume Two	Released: March 1968; Label: Kama Sutra (KLP/KLPS-8064)	156	—	
1960s	24 Karat Hits: A Double Dozen of All Time Best Sellers by the Lovin' Spoonful	Released: August 1968; Label: Kama Sutra (KLPS-750-2)	—	—	
1970s	The Very Best of the Lovin' Spoonful	Released: January 1970; Label: Kama Sutra (KSBS 2013)	—	—	
1970s	John Sebastian Song Book Vol.1	Released: January 1970; Label: Kama Sutra (KSBS-2011)	—	—	
1970s	Once Upon a Time	Released: 1971; Label: Kama Sutra (KSBS-2029)	—	—	
1970s	The Best ... Lovin' Spoonful	Released: February 1976; Label: Kama Sutra (KSBS-2608-2)	183	—	
1970s	The File Series	Released: 1977; Label: Pye (FILD-009)	—	—	
1980s	Greatest Hits	Released: 1981; Label: Quality (SV 2077)	—	—	
1980s	Distant Echoes	Released: 1982; Label: Accord (SN-7196)	—	—	
1980s	The EP Collection	Released: May 23, 1988; Label: See for Miles (SEE-229)	—	—	
1980s	The Collection	Released: 1988; Label: Castle Communications (CCSLP-187)	—	—	
1990s	Anthology	Released: January 23, 1990; Label: Rhino (R2-70944)	—	—	
1990s	Summer in the City	Released: 1995; Label: Spectrum (550-736-2)	—	—	
1990s	The Very Best of the Lovin' Spoonful	Released: 1998; Label: Camden (74321 558492)	—	—	
1990s	Collector's Edition	Released: 1999; Label: Platinum (DRC-1471/1472/1473)	—	—	
2000s	Greatest Hits	Released: February 22, 2000; Label: Buddah (BG2-99716)	—	—	
2000s	Platinum & Gold Collection	Released: 2003; Label: Buddah/BMG (82876 55162 2)	—	—	
2000s	Singles A's and B's	Released: 2006; Label: Repertoire (REP-5055)	—	—	
2020s	What a Day for a Daydream: The Complete Recordings	Released: March 27, 2026; Label: Strawberry (CR7JAMBX57)	—	—	
"—" denotes releases that did not chart or were not released in that territory.

=== Year-end rankings ===
List of albums with selected year-end chart rankings
Year	Album	Year-end rankings
Year	Album	US
1966	Daydream	85
1967	The Best of the Lovin' Spoonful	23

== EPs ==
List of UK EPs with selected chart positions
Year	Title (Note: The EP – short for Extended Play, a single-sized record with extra playing time – was a common format in Britain in the 1960s. This is a list of EPs released in the UK, though promotional EPs were also released in the US and other countries.)	EP details	Peak chart positions
Year	Title	EP details	UK
1966	Did You Ever Have to Make Up Your Mind	Released: June 3, 1966; Label: Kama Sutra (KEP 300)	3
1966	Jug Band Music	Released: August 19, 1966; Label: Kama Sutra (KEP 301)	7
1966	Summer in the City	Released: October 1966; Label: Kama Sutra (KEP 302)	—
1967	Day Blues	Released: February 1967; Label: Kama Sutra (KEP 303)	—
1967	Nashville Cats	Released: April 14, 1967; Label: Kama Sutra (KEP 304)	—
1967	Lovin' You	Released: June 1967; Label: Kama Sutra (KEP 305)	—
1967	Something in the Night	Released: October 1967; Label: Kama Sutra (KEP 306)	—
"—" denotes releases that did not chart.

== Singles ==
List of singles, with selected chart positions and certifications
Year	Single details	Peak chart positions									Certifications (sales thresholds)	Album
Year	Single details	US	AUS (Note: Go-Set published the first Australian national chart on October 5, 1966.)	CAN	FIN	GER	NL	NOR	SWE	UK	Certifications (sales thresholds)	Album
1965	"Do You Believe in Magic" b/w "On the Road Again": Released: July 20, 1965 (US), October 1, 1965 (UK); Label: Kama Sutra (KA 201), Pye International Records (7N.25327)	9	—	3	x	x	x	x	x	—		Do You Believe in Magic
1965	"You Didn't Have to Be So Nice" b/w "My Gal" (from Do You Believe In Magic): Released: November 1965 (US), January 14, 1966 (UK); Label: Kama Sutra (KA 205), Pye International Records (7N.25344)	10	—	2	x	x	x	x	x	—		Daydream
1966	"Daydream" b/w "Night Owl Blues" (from Do You Believe in Magic): Released: February 1966 (US), April 1, 1966 (UK); Label: Kama Sutra (KA 208), Pye International Records (7N.25361)	2	—	1	20	30	11	—	1	2		Daydream
1966	"Did You Ever Have to Make Up Your Mind?" b/w "Didn't Want to Have to Do It" (from Daydream): Released: April 1966 (US) (Note: Before the single's US release in April 1966, Quality Records issued it in December 1965 in select Canadian cities to test its potential performance in the American market.); Label: Kama Sutra (KA 209)	2	—	6	26	—	20	2	3	x		Do You Believe in Magic
1966	"Jug Band Music" b/w "Didn't Want to Have to Do It": Released: c. April 1966 (CA) (Note: "Jug Band Music" was released as a single exclusively in Canada. The song debuted on Toronto's CHUM Chart the week ending May 2, 1966, and it debuted on Canada's national chart two weeks later.); Label: Quality (KA 301X)	x	x	2	x	x	x	x	x	x		Daydream
1966	"Baldheaded Lena" b/w "On the Road Again" (from Do You Believe in Magic): Released: c. June 1966 (SE) (Note: "Baldheaded Lena" debuted on the Kvällstoppen chart on June 28, 1966.); Label: Kama Sutra (618 006)	x	x	x	x	x	x	x	1	x		Daydream
1966	"Summer in the City" b/w "Butchie's Tune" (from Daydream): Released: July 4, 1966 (US), July 8, 1966 (UK) (Note: Kama Sutra issued the single in the UK instead backed with "Bald Headed Lena".); Label: Kama Sutra (KA 211, KAS 200)	1	7	1	2	5	2	3	4	8	BPI: Silver; RIAA: Gold	Hums of the Lovin' Spoonful
1966	"Rain on the Roof" b/w "Pow (Theme from 'What's Up, Tiger Lily?')": Released: September 1966 (US), (Note: Later sources identify the release date as October 1966, but the October 7 issue of The Herald Statesman says the record came out "[l]ast week", indicating the week of September 26–30.) October 1966 (UK) (Note: Kama Sutra issued the single in the UK instead backed with "Warm Baby".); Label: Kama Sutra (KA 216, KAS 201)	10	31	12	28	—	13	—	11	—		Hums of the Lovin' Spoonful
1966	"Nashville Cats" b/w "Full Measure": Released: November 1966 (US), December 2, 1966 (UK); Label: Kama Sutra (KA 219, KAS 204)	8; 87 (Note: Though marketed as the single's B-side, "Full Measure" received strong airplay in several markets, especially Los Angeles. The song's regional success helped it reach number 87 on the national chart.)	26	2; 85	38	—	11	7	12	26		Hums of the Lovin' Spoonful
1966	"Good Time Music" b/w "Almost Grown": Released: December 5, 1966 (NL); Label: Disques Vogue (HV 2063)	x	x	x	x	x	—	x	x	x		What's Shakin'
1967	"Don't Bank on It, Baby" b/w "Searchin'": Released: January 3, 1967 (NL); Label: Disques Vogue (HV 2064)	x	x	x	x	x	—	x	x	x		What's Shakin'
1967	"Darling Be Home Soon" b/w "Darlin' Companion" (from Hums of the Lovin' Spoonful): Released: February 1967 (US), February 24, 1967 (UK); Label: Kama Sutra (KA 220, KAS 207)	15	—	8	—	—	16	—	—	44		You're a Big Boy Now
1967	"Six O'Clock" b/w "The Finale" (from You're a Big Boy Now): Released: April 6, 1967 (US), May 27, 1967 (UK); Label: Kama Sutra (KA 225, KAS 208)	18	—	12	—	—	x	—	—	—		Everything Playing
1967	"She Is Still a Mystery" b/w "Only Pretty, What a Pity": Released: September 21, 1967 (US), November 24, 1967 (UK); Label: Kama Sutra (KA 239, KAS 210)	27	—	3	—	x	x	x	x	—		Everything Playing
1967	"Money" b/w "Close Your Eyes": Released: December 1967 (US), February 1968 (UK); Label: Kama Sutra (KA 241, KAS 211)	48	—	28	x	—	x	x	x	—		Everything Playing
1968	"Never Goin' Back" b/w "Forever" (from Everything Playing): Released: June 5, 1968 (US), August 23, 1968 (UK); Label: Kama Sutra (KA 250, KAS 213)	73	—	49	x	—	x	x	x	—		Revelation: Revolution '69
1968	"(Till I) Run with You" b/w "Revelation: Revolution '69": Released: August 20, 1968 (US); Label: Kama Sutra (KA 251)	128 (Note: The song did not enter the Billboard Hot 100 but instead peaked on the Bubbling Under the Hot 100 chart.)	—	—	x	x	x	x	x	x		Revelation: Revolution '69
1969	"Me About You" b/w "Amazing Air": Released: c. January 1969 (US) (Note: Billboard reviewed "Me About You" in its February 1, 1969, issue, and the single debuted on the Bubbling Under the Hot 100 chart that same week. Cash Box magazine reviewed the single in its January 18, 1969, issue, and the single debuted on the magazine's singles chart a week later.); Label: Kama Sutra (KA 255)	91	x	70	x	x	x	x	x	x		Revelation: Revolution '69
1970	"Younger Generation" (Note: The single's face label credits "The Lovin' Spoonful featuring John Sebastian".) b/w "Boredom": Released: 1970 (US); Label: Buddah (KA 505)	—	x	x	x	x	x	x	x	x		John Sebastian Song Book Vol.1
2011	"Alley Oop" (Note: Recorded in August 1965 during the sessions for Do You Believe in Magic, "Alley Oop" was not released until 2002, when Buddha included it as a bonus track on the album's CD remaster. Sundazed Music issued the song in 2011 on a limited edition 7-inch vinyl record for Record Store Day.) b/w "Night Owl Blues" (unedited version): Released: November 25, 2011 (US); Label: Sundazed Music (S 235)	—	x	x	x	x	x	x	x	x		Do You Believe in Magic (2002 CD remaster)
"—" denotes releases that did not chart. "x" denotes single not released in that territory.

=== Year-end rankings ===
List of singles with selected year-end chart rankings
Year	Single	Year-end rankings		
Year	Single	US	BEL (FL)	NL
1965	"Do You Believe in Magic"	89	—	—
1966	"Daydream"	38	—	90
1966	"Did You Ever Have to Make Up Your Mind?"	48	—	—
1966	"Summer in the City"	35	87	19
"—" denotes releases that did not rank.
