= The Very Best of the Lovin' Spoonful =

Greatest hits album by the Lovin' Spoonful
- Released: January 1970
- Length: 30:04
- Label: Kama Sutra

The Lovin' Spoonful chronology
Revelation: Revolution '69 (1968)	The Very Best of the Lovin' Spoonful (1970)	The Best... Lovin' Spoonful (1976)

Professional ratings
Review scores
Source	Rating
Allmusic	4.5/5 stars

The Very Best of the Lovin' Spoonful is a compilation album by the Lovin' Spoonful, containing hits spanning their career through the 1960s, released in 1970.

The cover features clay sculptures of the band, with the band's signature lack of eyes, nose or mouth sculpted by Ollie Alpert and photographed by Bob Bailey. The motive is a clay remake of the cartoon image of the earlier "The Best of the Lovin' Spoonful" album.

== Track listing ==
=== Side one ===
1. "Younger Girl" (John Sebastian) – 2:23 (from Do You Believe in Magic)
2. "Didn't Want to Have to Do It" (John Sebastian) – 2:06 (from Daydream)
3. "Daydream" (John Sebastian) – 2:18 (from Daydream)
4. "You Didn't Have to Be So Nice" (John Sebastian/Steve Boone) – 2:29 (from Daydream)
5. "Did You Ever Have to Make Up Your Mind?" (John Sebastian) – 2:00 (from Do You Believe in Magic)
6. "Do You Believe in Magic?" (John Sebastian) – 2:04 (from Do You Believe in Magic)

=== Side two ===
1. "Summer in the City" (John Sebastian/Mark Sebastian/Steve Boone) – 2:39 (from Hums of the Lovin' Spoonful)
2. "Rain on the Roof" (John Sebastian) – 2:13 (from Hums of the Lovin' Spoonful)
3. "Six O'Clock" (John Sebastian) – 2:38 (from Everything Playing)
4. "Darling Be Home Soon" (John Sebastian) – 3:34 (from You're a Big Boy Now (soundtrack))
5. "Till I Run with You" (Alan Gordon/Gary Bonner) – 1:52 (from Revelation: Revolution '69)
6. "Never Going Back" (John Stewart) – 2:48 (from Revelation: Revolution '69)
