= The Lovin' Spoonful Anthology =

Anthology

Compilation album by the Lovin' Spoonful
- Released: January 23, 1990
- Recorded: 1965–1968
- Genre: Folk rock
- Length: 68:37
- Label: Rhino

The Lovin' Spoonful chronology
The Best... Lovin' Spoonful (1976)	Anthology (1990)	Live at the Hotel Seville (1999)

The Lovin' Spoonful Anthology is a compilation album by the folk rock group the Lovin' Spoonful, released in 1990.

The Lovin' Spoonful Anthology focuses mainly on The Lovin' Spoonful's 1965-1966 releases with a few obscure tracks such as "Pow!" from their What's Up, Tiger Lily? soundtrack and "Good Time Music", an early song found on a label sampler. All the band's biggest hits are included as well as a booklet with comments about the songs from John Sebastian.

== Reception ==
Professional ratings
Review scores
Source	Rating
AllMusic	5/5 stars
MusicHound Rock	5/5

In his Allmusic review, music critic Richie Unterberger wrote "Unquestionably the finest collection of a major band that did much to launch American folk-rock in the mid-'60s. Anthology jams 26 cuts onto a single CD, including all of their hits and some of their strongest album tracks, drawing mostly from their 1965-1966 prime."

== Track listing ==
1. "Good Time Music" (John Sebastian) – 3:06
2. "Do You Believe In Magic" (Sebastian) – 2:04
3. "You Didn't Have to Be So Nice" (Steve Boone, Sebastian) – 2:31
4. "Did You Ever Have to Make Up Your Mind?" (Sebastian) – 1:58
5. "You Baby" (Mann, Phil Spector, Weil) – 2:55
6. "Younger Girl" (Sebastian) – 2:19
7. "Fishin' Blues" Traditional– 2:00
8. "Daydream" (Sebastian) – 2:18
9. "Jug Band Music" (Sebastian) – 2:51
10. "Didn't Want to Have to Do It" (Sebastian) – 2:36
11. "Summer in the City" (Boone, Sebastian, Mark Sebastian) – 2:39
12. "Pow!" (Boone, Joe Butler, Sebastian, Zal Yanovsky) – 2:28
13. "Rain on the Roof" (Sebastian) – 2:11
14. "Nashville Cats" (Sebastian) – 2:34
15. "Full Measure" (Boone, Sebastian) – 2:40
16. "Lovin' You" (Sebastian) – 2:28
17. "Coconut Grove" (Sebastian, Yanovsky) – 2:42
18. "Darling Be Home Soon" (Boone, Sebastian) – 3:31
19. "You're a Big Boy Now" (Boone, Butler, Sebastian) – 2:38
20. "Lonely (Amy's Theme)" (Sebastian) – 3:19
21. "Six O'Clock" (Sebastian) – 2:41
22. "She Is Still a Mystery" (Sebastian) – 3:02
23. "Money" (Sebastian) – 1:54
24. "Younger Generation" (Sebastian) – 2:40
25. "Never Going Back" (John Stewart) – 2:44
26. "Me About You" (Garry Bonner, Alan Gordon) – 3:48

== Personnel ==
According to the album's liner notes:

The Lovin' Spoonful

- John Sebastian – guitars, lead vocals, autoharp, harmonica, Wurlitzer electric piano, Irish harp, clarinet, harmonium, marxophone
- Zal Yanovsky – lead guitars, vocals, lead six-string bass, electric gorgle, Chinese gong
- Steve Boone – bass, pianos, organs
- Joe Butler – drums, percussion, vocals; lead vocals ("You Baby", "Never Going Back" and "Me About You")
- Jerry Yester (replaced Yanovsky for tracks 22–26) – lead guitars, keyboards, vocals, vocal and orchestral arrangements

Additional musicians

- Chip Douglas – bass ("Never Going Back")
- Red Rhodes – pedal steel guitar ("Never Going Back")
- John Stewart – guitar ("Never Going Back")
