= The Best... Lovin' Spoonful =

1976 album by The Lovin' Spoonful

Compilation album by the Lovin' Spoonful
- Released: February 1976
- Length: 55:28
- Label: Kama Sutra

The Lovin' Spoonful chronology
The Very Best of the Lovin' Spoonful (1970)	The Best... Lovin' Spoonful (1976)	The Lovin' Spoonful Anthology (1990)

The Best... Lovin' Spoonful is a compilation album by the Canadian-American folk-rock band the Lovin' Spoonful. Released in February 1976, the double LP includes liner notes written by P. K. Vollmuth.

== Reception ==
Professional ratings
Review scores
Source	Rating
AllMusic (1994 reissue)	4.5/5 stars
The Encyclopedia of Popular Music	4/5 stars

AllMusic's William Ruhlmann called it the "most complete Lovin' Spoonful compilation yet released, and for some time the only one in print in the U.S." Robert Christgau included the album in his "Basic Record Library" of 1950s and 1960s recordings, published in his 1981 book Christgau's Record Guide: Rock Albums of the Seventies.

== Track listing ==
All tracks are written by John Sebastian, except where noted.

Side one

1. "Do You Believe in Magic" – 2:05
2. "Daydream" – 2:18
3. "Summer in the City" (J. Sebastian, Mark Sebastian, Steve Boone) – 2:40
4. "Lovin' You" – 2:27
5. "Rain on the Roof" – 2:11
6. "Coconut Grove" (J. Sebastian, Yanovsky) – 2:41

Side two

1. "Darling Be Home Soon" – 3:36
2. "(Till I) Run With You" (Alan Gordon, Gary Bonner) – 1:54
3. "Younger Generation" – 2:39
4. "Warm Baby" – 2:00
5. "Money" – 1:53
6. "Night Owl Blues" (Joe Butler, Boone, Yanovsky, J. Sebastian) – 3:00

Side three

1. "You Didn't Have to Be So Nice" (J. Sebastian, Boone) – 2:26
2. "Younger Girl" – 2:18
3. "Didn't Want to Have to Do It" – 2:36
4. "4 Eyes" – 2:51
5. "Six O'Clock" – 2:41

Side four

1. "Did You Ever Have to Make Up Your Mind" – 1:58
2. "Never Going Back" (John Stewart) – 2:51
3. "She Is Still a Mystery" – 2:59
4. "Nashville Cats" – 2:34
5. "Jug Band Music" – 2:50

== Charts ==
Weekly chart performance for The Best... Lovin' Spoonful
Chart (1976)	Peak position
US Billboard 200	183

== Sources ==
- Christgau, Robert (1981). "A Basic Record Library: The Fifties and Sixties". Christgau's Record Guide: Rock Albums of the Seventies. Boston: Ticknor & Fields. ISBN 978-0-89919-025-9. Archived from the original on June 6, 2025 – via robertchristgau.com.
