= Jim Yester =

American musician (born 1939)

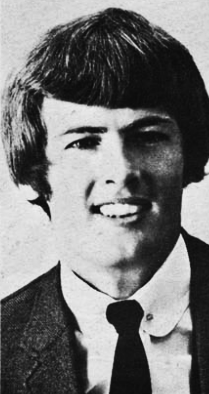
- Yester in 1966
- Born: James Yester; November 24, 1939 (age 86); Birmingham, Alabama, U.S.
- Known for: Being a member of the Association
- Relatives: Jerry Yester (brother)
- Musical career
- Genres: Folk rock, sunshine pop
- Occupation: Musician
- Instruments: Vocals, guitar, piano
- Years active: 1952–present
- Member of: The Association
- Formerly of: Modern Folk Quartet; The Lovin' Spoonful

James Yester (born November 24, 1939) is an American musician. He is a member of the sunshine pop group the Association, who had numerous hits on the Billboard charts during the 1960s, including "Windy", "Cherish", "Never My Love" and "Along Comes Mary", among many others.

Yester was a core member of the Modern Folk Quartet when they reformed in the 1980s. He is the older brother of former Lovin' Spoonful member Jerry Yester, and he played briefly with that band in the 1990s. Since 2007, Yester has remained a member of the Association, co-leading alongside original member Jules Alexander and Del Ramos (brother of late Association member Larry Ramos).

== Early life (1939–1952) ==
Jim Yester was born in Birmingham, Alabama to Lawrence and Martha Yester. Yester's family moved to Burbank, California when he was three because his father wanted to get involved in the film industry. His father was a local Birmingham radio broadcaster, who played the part of a band member in the 1948 film Fort Apache, and was also a freelance piano player and author of numerous books based around the accordion. The first concert Jim attended was a Fats Domino concert at the Olive Recreation Center.

Growing up, Yester attended Notre Dame High School in Sherman Oaks, California and was a member of the Falconry club there. He first learned how to play the harmonica while walking to and from elementary school. Then, later on, Yester learned how to play the piano at the home of a fellow Falconry club member who had a piano in the garage where their meetings would take place; Yester would watch him play the instrument, and then play it himself after his friend finished.

== Early career (1952–1965) ==
He started playing the piano in clubs when he was 13. He attended Los Angeles Valley College studying accounting.

Jim enlisted in the army in 1961 and was based in Germany. He was later discharged in 1964. When in the Army, he met two other troops who put together a comedy trio. After sending a tape to an entertainment director in Germany, the director pulled them out of combat so they could tour around France and Germany, entertaining soldiers:

They sent me to Germany. I was in a 280 millimeter canon outfit for awhile and I requested a transfer because I'd been head of my class in the field I was in. They authorized a field but they didn't have it. So then I wound up in a medium tank battalion and in the same Commo section were two guys. One was a Jazz guitarist from Greenwich Village. The other was kind of a Jackie Mason type guy who had been in a Folk group in college and had put out an album, and we put together a Folk/Comedy trio and sent a tape out to the Entertainment Director in Nuremberg. They freaked and pulled us from our outfit and sent us all over Germany and France, entertaining the troops. So, that was fantastic. We did that for almost a year.

Sometime in the late 1950s/early 1960s in Los Angeles, Jim and his brother Jerry performed as a folk duo called The Yester Brothers and were managed by Martin "Mutt" Cohen, who owned the Unicorn Coffee House. Mutt's brother, Herbie, would later manage the Modern Folk Quartet, a band both brothers would later be affiliated with:

Probably the one that had the most effect on me was at the Hollywood Bowl. Henry Mancini and his orchestra with Peggy Lee, then Mancini and orchestra doing all the Peter Gunn music, followed by the Kingston Trio. My brother Jerry and I had begun singing as a folk duo, and the concert convinced us that was what we wanted to do.

== The Association (1965–) ==
=== 1965–1966 ===
In 1966, Yester was asked to join the group The Association when their original rhythm guitarist Bob Page left two weeks after the band formed:

I'd gotten an audition at the Troubadour and played Wednesday nights at the Ice House. Bob Stane, the owner, pulled me aside and said, ‘Good news, these guys have put together a new group’ – which was The Association, who had only been together for two weeks – ‘and they want you to call them.’ They were looking to replace one of the guys; he was a banjo player with a bit of an attitude. Then, I sang for them, and they sang for me. Jules told me, ‘Come back in three days and you can move in’. So, I moved in, and that was my beginning with the band.

The group rehearsed for six months and were eventually signed to Jubilee Records:

Before we started performing anywhere, we would spend six months of the year just on our act. We rehearsed, wrote, and worked on choreography. To make money during that time, musicians would play on demo sessions for other people. After seeing which roles worked best for each member, Jules ended up playing bass on what would become ‘Along Comes Mary.’ We tried that out one night, and the next day, we put the song in our act. It's a killer song with a great sound.

During their short tenure with Jubilee Records, they recorded their first single "Babe I'm Gonna Leave You" (a song originally recorded by Joan Baez, later popularized by Led Zeppelin) and then recorded "One Too Many Mornings" (originally recorded by Bob Dylan in 1964), which was produced by Valiant's owner, Barry De Vorzon, at Gold Star Studios soon after. After a few months, they were given to Valiant Records.

=== 1966–1969 ===
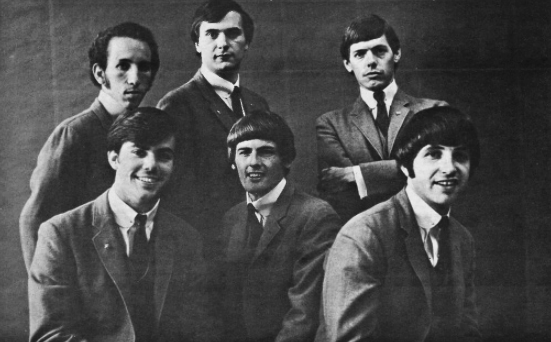
Yester (bottom middle) with The Association in 1966.

Their debut album And Then... Along Comes the Association was released in July. Two of the songs from the album, "Along Comes Mary" and "Cherish" charted on the Billboard Hot 100, with "Cherish" reaching number one. Yester sang lead on "Along Comes Mary", a controversial song reputedly about marijuana. The band managed to convince Valiant to let Curt Boettcher produce the album for them. When the band were starting to garner a following, Yester was sharing a house with members Jules Alexander and Russ Giguere. Yester was one of the group's main songwriters.

The band is known for their harmonies and multiple lead vocalists, with Jim contributing on Tenor vocals, that can be heard on "Cherish".

The group's other hits in the following years included "Windy", "Everything That Touches You", "Never My Love", and "Requiem for the Masses". Windy and Never My Love scored at number one and number two, respectively, on the Billboard Hot 100, and Everything That Touches You charted at number ten.

On Friday, June 16, 1967, the band were the lead-off act at the Monterey International Pop Festival. The band were introduced onto the stage by The Mamas & the Papas member John Phillips (who was also a key-organizer of the event) however, due to them being the first act, the camera crew were still setting up equipment, meaning the first half of the group's performance wasn't filmed, and what set of songs they performed aren't 100% known, but the songs The Machine, Along Comes Mary, and Windy, have surviving footage, performed in that respective order.

As a member of the Association, he has been nominated for a Grammy Award six times, three times each in the 9th and 10th Annual Grammy Awards, both of which were held in 1967 and 1968, respectively.

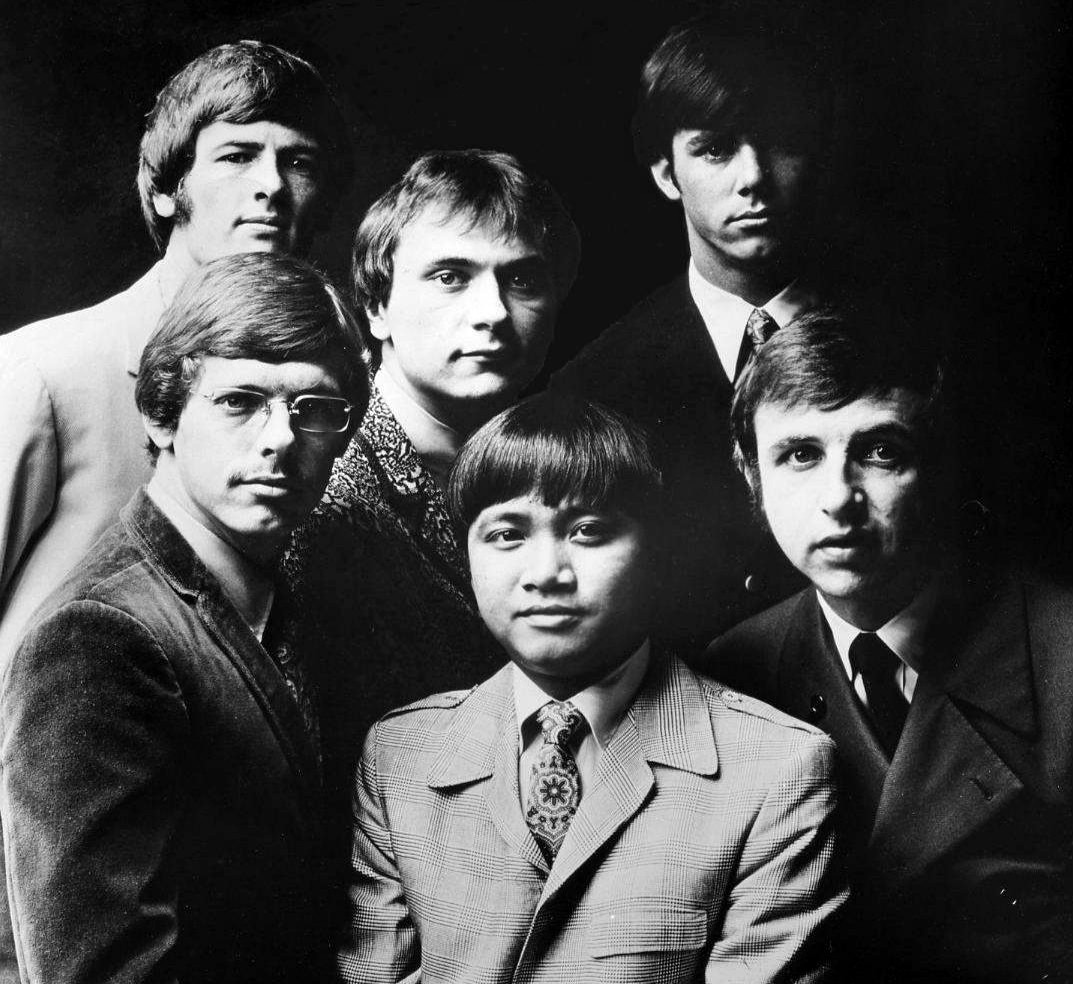
The Association in 1967 (Yester top left)

The Association were regular guests on the variety show The Smothers Brothers Comedy Hour during 1968, and also partook in a fair amount of performances on the Red Skelton Hour.

The band would later appear on many other shows including Top of the Pops and The Ed Sullivan Show. He composed the title song for the movie Goodbye Columbus, which earned the Association a nomination for Best Original Song at the 1969 Golden Globe Awards.

In August 1969, a collection of Poems, penned by the seven members of the Association, were released as the book "Crank Your Spreaders".

=== 1970s–1980s ===
Yester appeared on the band's last two studio albums, Stop Your Motor (1971) and Waterbeds in Trinidad! (1972). Soon after the death of Brian Cole of a heroin overdose, the band was reportedly "in a state of flux, releasing singles intermittently along with sporadic touring", and many members were drifting in and out of the band, and Yester would leave the Association in 1973, however, Jim returned to the band later on that year. In 1975 the band signed with RCA Records where they released two singles, "One Sunday Morning" (produced in Canada by Jack Richardson) and "Sleepy Eyes". An album called The Association Bites Back was to follow but was never released.

During this period, the band was offered a production deal with Mike Curb, who wanted them to record a disco version of the prior hits, "Cherish", "No Fair At All" and an original song which Larry Brown wrote and sang entitled "It's High Time To Get High". The deal did not go through. Yester left the group again in 1976 and shortly after, the band temporarily split up in 1978. A year later, in September 1979, the surviving key members, reunited at the Ambassador Hotel's Coconut Grove nightclub in Los Angeles for an HBO special called Then and Now.

The following year the reunited group also appeared at a charity show hosted in Dallas by Ed McMahon called Ed McMahon and Company that ran on the Showtime cable network in August 1980. These reunions led to the band getting back together again in 1979.

In 1981, the band appeared on American Bandstand, and in 1983, Jim left the Association.

=== 2000s-present ===
In 2003, the Association were inducted into the Vocal Group Hall of Fame, where the then-surviving members performed "Along Comes Mary" and "Windy".

Yester returned to the Association in 2007, and has been touring with founding member Jules Alexander since then. The Association are one of many acts that perform on the Happy Together tour, a tour of famous 1960s pop and folk groups such as The Turtles, Gary Puckett & The Union Gap and The Cowsills.

Three songs by the Association have sold over one million copies and have been certified platinum discs: "Cherish", "Windy", and "Never My Love".

The current lineup of the group consists of Yester (rhythm and lead guitar; 1965–1973, 1974–1977, 1979–1983, 2007–present), Jules Alexander (lead and rhythm guitar; 1965–1967, 1969–1974, 1979–1989, since 2012), Bruce Pictor (drums since 1985), Paul Holland (bass 1988–1999; rhythm and lead guitar since 2014), Del Ramos (brother of Association member Larry Ramos; bass since 1999) and Jordan Cole (son of Association member Brian Cole, keyboard since 1999).

The Band were recipients of the Rock Justice Awards on January 18, 2019, at Village Studios in Los Angeles.

== Modern Folk Quartet (1985–1991) ==
Yester played in the reformed Modern Folk Quartet, from 1985 to 1991, and contributed to the albums;

- Moonlight Serenade (1985)
- Live From Japan (1989)
- Bamboo Saloon (1990)
- MFQ Christmas (1990)
- MFQ Wolfgang (1991)

== The Lovin’ Spoonful (1991–1994) ==
In 1991, after a long-awaited settlement with their record company, Joe Butler and Steve Boone, of the Lovin' Spoonful, decided to start the group up again with Jerry Yester, who had joined the band later on, in 1967. The Lovin' Spoonful are known for hits such as "Do You Believe in Magic", "Summer in the City" and "Darling Be Home Soon". They were joined by Jim, due to other original Spoonful members John Sebastian and Zal Yanovsky declining to participate. After a two-month rehearsal in the Berkshire Mountains, the group started touring. Jim Yester left this new grouping in 1994, and was replaced by guitarist Randy Chance.

== Other works ==
Yester co-wrote the song Raven In A Cage with Lovin' Spoonful member Zal Yanovsky for Yanovsky's 1968 solo album Alive And Well In Argentina.

In 1978, Yester opened for Robin Williams as a solo artist at the Ice House (which by then had slowly shifted from a music bar to a comedy club). In the mid 1980s, he temporarily moved to Hawaii and formed a dance band called Rainbow Connection with his brother Jerry, and Rainbow Rastasan (Rainbow Page).

Jim later joined with Bruce Belland of The Four Preps, and The Diamonds' Dave Somerville, to form YBS, who also bill themselves as the Three Tenors of Rock. YBS toured until Somerville's death in 2015.

On July 28, 2013, Yester guest appeared with the ensemble, the YesterDaze.

Yester still continues to perform in clubs as a solo artist, albeit less often than he did earlier in his career.

== Personal life ==
Yester has two brothers, Ted (older brother) and Jerry (younger brother). Jerry has also played in the Modern Folk Quartet and the Lovin' Spoonful.

Yester currently resides in Galloway Township, New Jersey, after previously living in Hollywood, Los Angeles from 1943 to 1989, and has a daughter. He married his current wife, Kathy, on March 2, 2017.

== Equipment ==
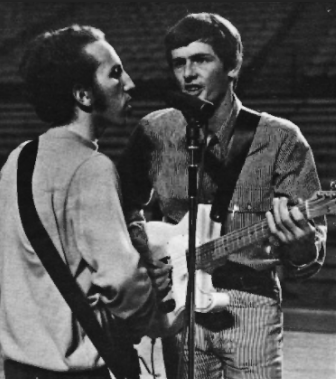
Yester, on right, rehearsing with the Association whilst playing a Fender Telecaster in 1966

Yester has used a variety of guitars during his career. When he appeared on The Andy Williams Show in 1966, he played a Vox Teardrop guitar. He played a Gibson ES-335, Fender Telecaster, and a Fender Stratocaster on The Smothers Brothers Comedy Hour. In his most recent performances, he uses a Fender Stratocaster.

== Bands ==
- Solo (1952–present)
- The Yester Brothers (1950s–1960s)
- The Association (1965–1973, 1974–1977, 1979–1983, 2007–present)
- Modern Folk Quartet (1985–1991)
- The Lovin’ Spoonful (1991–1994)
- YBS (1990s-c. 2015)

== Discography ==
=== The Association ===
==== Albums ====
Title	Year
And Then... Along Comes the Association	1966
Renaissance	1966
Insight Out	1967
Birthday	1968
The Association	1969
Stop Your Motor	1971
Waterbeds in Trinidad!	1972

==== Singles ====
Titles	US	USCashbox	AUS	UK	Certification	Year
"Babe I'm Gonna Leave You" b/w "Baby, Can't You Hear Me Call Your Name"	—	—	—	—		1965
"One Too Many Mornings" b/w "Forty Times"	—	—	—	—		1965
"Along Comes Mary" b/w "Your Own Love"	7	9	—	52		1966
"Cherish" b/w "Don't Blame It on Me" (titled "Don't Blame the Rain" on non-U.S. 45s)	1	1	33	—	US: Gold	1966
"Pandora's Golden Heebie Jeebies" b/w "Standing Still" (from And Then...Along Comes the Association)	35	26	—	—		1966
"No Fair at All" / "Looking Glass"	51 113	53	—	—		1967
"Windy" b/w "Sometime"	1	1	34	53	US: Platinum	1967
"Never My Love" / "Requiem for the Masses"	2 100	1	—	—	US: Platinum	1967
"Everything That Touches You" b/w "We Love Us" (from Insight Out)	10	11	—	—		1968
"Time for Livin'" b/w "Birthday Morning"	39	22	—	23		1968
"Six Man Band" b/w "Like Always" (from Birthday)	47	29	—	—		1968
"The Time It Is Today" b/w "Enter the Young" (from And Then...Along Comes the Association)	—	—	—	—		1969
"Goodbye, Columbus" b/w "The Time It Is Today" (from Birthday)	80	78	—	—		1969
"Under Branches" b/w "Hear in Here" (from Birthday)	117	—	—	—		1969
"Yes, I Will" b/w "I Am Up for Europe"	120	—	—			1970
"Dubuque Blues" b/w "Are You Ready"	—	84	—	—		1970
"Just About the Same" b/w "Look at Me, Look at You" (from The Association)	106	91	—	—		1970
"Along the Way" b/w "Traveler's Guide"	—	—	—	—		1970
"P.F. Sloan" b/w "Traveler's Guide"	—	—	—	—		1971
"Bring Yourself Home" b/w "It's Gotta Be Real"	—	—	—	—		1971
"That's Racin'" b/w "Makes Me Cry" (alternate title for "Funny Kind of Song")	—	—	—	—		1971
"Darlin' Be Home Soon" b/w "Indian Wells Woman"	104	90	—	—		1972
"Come the Fall" b/w "Kicking the Gong Around"	—	—	—	—		1972
"Names, Tags, Numbers and Labels" b/w "Rainbows Bent" (from Waterbeds in Trinidad!)	91	85	—	—		1973
"One Sunday Morning" b/w "Life Is a Carnival"	—	—	—	—		1975
"Sleepy Eyes" b/w "Take Me to the Pilot"	—	—	—	—		1975
"Dreamer" b/w "You Turn the Light On"	66	—	—	—		1981
"Small Town Lovers" b/w "Across the Persian Gulf"	—	—	—	—		1981

=== Modern Folk Quartet ===
==== Albums ====
Title	Year
Moonlight Seranade	1985
Live in Japan	1989
Bamboo Saloon	1990
MFQ Christmas	1990
MFQ Wolfgang	1991

==== Singles ====
Title(s)	Year
Together to Tomorrow / Keepin' the Dream Alive	1990

=== YBS ===
==== Singles ====
Title
Let's Give Them Something to Talk About

== Partial songwriting credits ==
=== The Association ===
Title	Album	Year
Memories of You	Renaissance	1966
Come to Me	Renaissance	1966
No Fair at All	Renaissance	1966
When Love Comes to Me	Insight Out	1967
Rose Petals, Incense and a Kitten	Birthday	1968
Barefoot Gentleman	Birthday	1968
Birthday Morning	Birthday	1968
What Were the Words?	The Association	1969
Goodbye, Columbus	Goodbye, Columbus	1969
Along the Way	Stop Your Motor	1971

=== Solo Artists ===
Title	For	Year	Note
Raven In A Cage	Zal Yanovsky	1968	

== Nominations ==
As a member of the Association, he has been nominated for a Grammy Award six times, three times each in the 9th and 10th Annual Grammy Awards:

=== 9th Annual Grammy Awards (1967) ===
Category	Song	Note
Best Contemporary Group Performance	Cherish	
Best Contemporary Recording	Cherish	
Best Performance By A Vocal Group	Cherish	

=== 10th Annual Grammy Awards (1968) ===
Category	Song/Album	Note
Best Contemporary Group Performance	Windy	
Best Contemporary Album	Insight Out	
Best Performance By A Vocal Group	Never My Love	

== See also ==
- The Association
- List of guitarists
- List of keyboardists
- List of rhythm guitarists
- List of Fender Stratocaster players
- List of lead vocalists
- List of singer-songwriters
