= Jimmy Ryan (musician) =

American musician

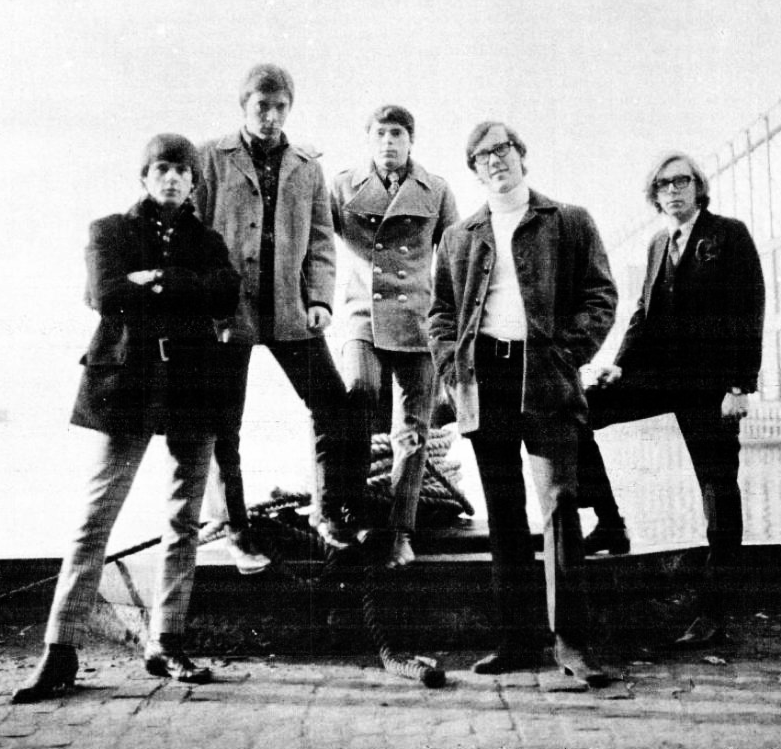
Ryan, second from right, with The Critters in 1967.

James Ryan is an American musician, composer, producer, arranger, and author known for his music career spanning over six decades. He is an original member of the 60s band The Critters, with hits Younger Girl, Mr. Dieingly Sad and Don’t Let The Rain Fall Down on Me.

He has collaborated with artists such as Carly Simon, Paul McCartney, Cat Stevens, Elton John, and Rod Stewart. From the early to mid 2010s, Ryan was a member of The Hit Men, which featured Ryan reuniting with his former Critters bandmate Don Ciccone and members of Ciccone's other band The Four Seasons; when performing Four Seasons material with The Hit Men, Ryan filled the parts originally sung by Frankie Valli.

He has been inducted into the Iowa Rock 'n’ Roll Music Association Hall of Fame receiving the Lifetime Achievement Award. He is also known for composing music for television, including Themes for NBC News, CNBC, News 12 and Gannett. He is also known for CBS Sports 1998 Olympics Opening Theme plus the musical soundtrack for CBS Movie, My Sergei, promotional music composition for Food Network, History Channel, Comedy Central, Showtime, USA Network, Lifetime, PBS, and the Discovery Channel.
