= The Best of the Lovin' Spoonful =

Greatest hits album by the Lovin' Spoonful
- Released: February 1967
- Recorded: June 1965 – March 1966
- Genre: Folk rock
- Length: 29:10
- Label: Kama Sutra
- Producer: Erik Jacobsen

The Lovin' Spoonful chronology
Hums of the Lovin' Spoonful (1966)	The Best of the Lovin' Spoonful (1967)	You're a Big Boy Now (1967)

The Best of the Lovin' Spoonful is the first compilation album by the Canadian-American folk-rock band the Lovin' Spoonful. Released in February 1967, it features songs from the band's first two albums and their single "Summer in the City". It is the band's most successful album release; it peaked at number three in both the U.S. and Canada, and Billboard magazine ranked it at number 23 on its 1967 year-end chart. RIAA certified the album for gold that year, indicating retail sales of US$1 million (equivalent to US$9 million in 2024).

== Reception ==
Professional ratings
Review scores
Source	Rating
AllMusic	4.5/5 stars
MusicHound Rock	3.5/5
New Musical Express	4/5 stars

In his Allmusic review, music critic William Ruhlman wrote "this compilation is an attempt to balance group concerns rather than present their most successful performances. Nevertheless, it picks the strongest material from the group's three previous albums..."

== Track listing ==
All songs written by John Sebastian, except where noted.

Side one

1. "Do You Believe in Magic" – 2:04
2. "Did You Ever Have to Make Up Your Mind?" – 2:00
3. "Butchie's Tune" (Steve Boone) – 2:34
4. "Jug Band Music" – 2:49
5. "Night Owl Blues" (J. Sebastian, Zal Yanovsky, Boone, Joe Butler) – 3:00
6. "You Didn't Have to Be So Nice" (J. Sebastian, Boone) – 2:29

Side two

1. "Daydream" – 2:18
2. "Blues in the Bottle" (traditional, adapt. and arr. by the Lovin' Spoonful, Steve Weber, Peter Stampfel) – 2:10
3. "Didn't Want to Have to Do It" – 2:06
4. "Wild About My Lovin'" (traditional, adapt. and arr. by J. Sebastian) – 2:38
5. "Younger Girl" – 2:23
6. "Summer in the City" (J. Sebastian, Mark Sebastian, Boone) – 2:39

== Charts ==
Weekly chart performance
Chart (1967)	Peak position
Canadian RPM 25 Top LPs	3
U.S. Billboard Top LPs	3
U.S. Cash Box Top 100 Albums	3
U.S. Record World 100 Top LPs	3

Year-end chart performance
Chart (1967)	Ranking
U.S. Billboard Top Records	23
U.S. Cash Box Best Albums	15

== Certifications ==
Certifications for The Best of the Lovin' Spoonful
Region	Certification	Certified units/sales
United States (RIAA)	Gold	500,000^{^}
^{^} Shipments figures based on certification alone.

== Sources ==
- Hinman, Doug (2004). The Kinks: All Day and All of the Night: Day-by-Day Concerts, Recordings and Broadcasts, 1961–1996. San Francisco, California: Backbeat Books. ISBN 978-0-87930-765-3.
