= Live at the Hotel Seville =

Live at the Hotel Seville in Harrison Arkansas

Live album by the Lovin' Spoonful
- Released: November 2, 1999
- Label: Varèse Sarabande

The Lovin' Spoonful chronology
The Lovin' Spoonful Anthology (1990)	Live at the Hotel Seville in Harrison Arkansas (1999)	Greatest Hits (2000)

Live at the Hotel Seville is a live album recorded by the folk rock group, the Lovin' Spoonful at the Hotel Seville in Harrison Arkansas. It was released on November 2, 1999, on the Varèse Sarabande label.

== Musicians ==
- Joe Butler - vocals, guitars, autoharp, percussion
- Jerry Yester - guitars, vocals
- Lena Yester - keyboards, vocals
- Steve Boone - bass
- Mike Arturi - drums

== Track listing ==
1. You Didn't Have to Be So Nice
2. Never Goin' Back
3. Nashville Cats
4. Fishin' Blues
5. Jugband Music
6. Younger Girl
7. Full Measure
8. Didn't Want To Have To Do It
9. Did You Ever Have to Make Up Your Mind?
10. Six O'Clock
11. Daydream
12. Summer in the City
13. Do You Believe In Magic
14. Henry Thomas
15. Don't You Just Know It
