= Mad Movies with the L.A. Connection =

- Created by: Kent Skov
- Composers: Richard Baker and Mary Newland
- Country of origin: United States
- Original language: English
- No. of seasons: 1
- No. of episodes: 26

Production
- Executive producer: Kent Skov
- Running time: 30 minutes
- Production company: Four Star Television

Original release
- Release: 1985 – 1986

Mad Movies with the L.A. Connection is a 1985 syndicated television show produced by the comedy troupe the L.A. Connection. Every episode is a spoof of a classic movie where the video is the original (although edited to fit the show's half-hour format) but all the dialogue is overdubbed with humorous dialogue written and voiced by the L.A. Connection, in a manner similar to Woody Allen's feature-length film What's Up, Tiger Lily?. During one season, 26 half-hour episodes were produced. Before producing the series, the L.A. Connection did live comedy dubbing of films at the Ken Theater in San Diego and the Nuart Theater in Los Angeles.

The original run was syndicated to local stations by Four Star Television during the 1985-1986 television season; it was later seen in reruns on Nick at Nite from 1987 to 1989. The theme was performed by Mary Newland.

== Cast ==
- Bob Buchholz
- Connie Sue Cook
- Steve Pinto
- Stephen Rollman
- Kent Skov
- April Winchell (additional voices)

== Complete episode list ==
Episode #100 *"Cyrano de Bergerac (1950)" - José Ferrer plays the famous poet who becomes a job-hungry egomaniac in this version. Plus, in the Home Movie, an alien invasion.

Episode #101 *"Santa Fe Trail (1940)" - Ron Reagan Jr. (Errol Flynn) has a nightmare that his father (Ronald Reagan) is running against Abraham Lincoln for the Presidency.

Episode #102 *"The Little Princess (1939)" - Shirley Temple is possessed by a doll, and only a song-and-dance exorcism can save her.

Episode #103 *"A Star Is Born (1937)" - Janet Gaynor is an unfortunate little girl who needs a date in this reworking.

Episodes #104 & #105 *"Shock (Pts. 1 & 2) (1946)" - The only two-episode Mad Movie parodies the lust, intrigue and murder of a soap opera... and finds a doctor (Vincent Price) who still makes house calls! Actress Anabel Shaw, who starred in the original film, gives an interview with host Kent Scov.

Episode #106 *"Night of the Living Dead (1968)" - A party with no food or drink becomes a wild free-for-all for Judith O'Dea and Duane Jones. Features a special appearance by Harry Medved, co-creator (with brother Michael) of the Golden Turkey Awards; and a visit to the School of Magic, via the Home Movie.

Episode #107 *"Nothing Sacred (1937)" - A woman (Carole Lombard) hires a detective (Fredric March) to locate her friends---who are over the rainbow; plus, how to spot top enemy agent Alexander Zolkov in the Home Movie.

Episode #108 *"Sherlock Holmes and the Secret Weapon (1943)" - Holmes and Watson (Basil Rathbone, Nigel Bruce) are hired to stop a conspiracy from stealing library books and selling them on the black market; and the fantastic tale of "Super Baby" in the Home Movie.

Episode #109 *"Doll Face (1945)" - A behind-the-scenes look at the world of beauty contests, with Vivian Blaine, Dennis O'Keefe, Perry Como and Carmen Miranda; plus, the Home Movie has the answer for thirsty travelers everywhere: "Beer Beach"!

Episode #110 *"Under California Stars (1948)" - a compulsive gambler (Roy Rogers) cannot control his urges. In addition, the Home Movie tells us about The Giant.

Episode #111 *"My Favorite Brunette (1947)" - In a spoof of this Bob Hope classic, the head of a gangster family receives a death threat. Also, the Home Movie tells the tale of the notorious siblings, "The Buck Brothers".

Episode #112 *"Outpost in Morocco (1949)" - A spy thriller in which the hero pulls the plug on water thieves. Guest appearance by Marie Windsor, who played Cara in the original 1949 film. Also, the Home Movie reveals the story of the Russian athlete, Little Olga.

Episode #113 *"The Inspector General (1949)" - Danny Kaye is a rock star with a military look in this parody; plus, the origin of huge food in the Home Movie.

Episode #114 *"D.O.A. (1950)" - In a spoof of "I Love Lucy," a man (Edmond O'Brien) searches for his missing wife and winds up falling in love with his wife's friend Ethel. Also, the Home Movie examines the story of a family who went from "Rags to Riches".

Episode #115 *"The Stranger (1946)" - A sleazy tabloid editor (Edward G. Robinson) wants to make former hunchback Quasimodo (Orson Welles) the subject of an article in this spoof. Also, the Home Movie takes us on a visit to "Christmas Land".

Episode #116 *"This Is the Army (1943)" - In this spoof of the Irving Berlin musical, President Reagan decides to reenlist in order to supervise things from the inside; plus, the Home Movie, "Future Wives".

Episode #117 *"Beneath the 12-Mile Reef (1953)" - Jack Cousteau (Gilbert Roland) and crew try to stop marauders from stripping the ocean floor of the endangered sea brain. Also: an interview with actress Terry Moore, who starred in the original 1953 film, and the Home Movie, "The Rainmaker".

Episode #118 *"The Perils of Pauline (1947)" - Against her husband's (John Lund) wishes, Pauline (Betty Hutton) runs for mayor in this parody; also, Home Movies examines "Home Entertainment".

Episode #119 *"Decameron Nights (1953)" - The not so "happily-ever-after" part of romance is seen when Cinderella (Joan Fontaine) and her prince (Louis Jourdan) experience marital problems; plus, Home Movies looks at the latest exercise fad, "Baby-Robics".

Episode #120 *"Captain Scarlett (1953)" - No one is safe when Robin Hood, Red Riding Hood and Captain Scarlett (Richard Greene, Leonora Amar, Nedrick Young) join forces to fight tyranny in this parody; plus, the Home Movie, "Oddities II".

Episode #121 *"The Outlaw (1943)" - Billy the Kid, Bat Masterson and Doc Holliday (Jack Buetel, Thomas Mitchell, Walter Huston) rub elbows in this offbeat version of Howard Hughes' classic; plus, the Home Movie, "Un-Electric Cowboy".

Episode #122 *"Zorro's Fighting Legion (1939)" - In this spoof, the masked avenger (Reed Hadley) faces a deadly challenge from a mechanical villain; plus, the Home Movie, "Zombie Kids".

Episode #123 *"The Divorce of Lady X (1938)" - A swingers' magazine provides the setting for this parody, starring Merle Oberon and Laurence Olivier; plus, the Home Movie, "The Fable".

Episode #124 *"Mad Movies Double Feature" - Robbery suspects abound in this double feature including "Dressed to Kill (1946)," with Holmes and Watson in pursuit of midget thieves; and "Daniel Boone (1936)" (George O'Brien) in search of the local hoods who stole his coonskin cap.

Episode #125 *"The Best of Mad Movies" - Host (and L.A. Connection founder) Kent Skov looks back at highlights from the previous episodes, and the gang voice an all new Mad Movie made from rejected bits of the previous films. (final episode)
