= The Critters =

American pop group from New Jersey

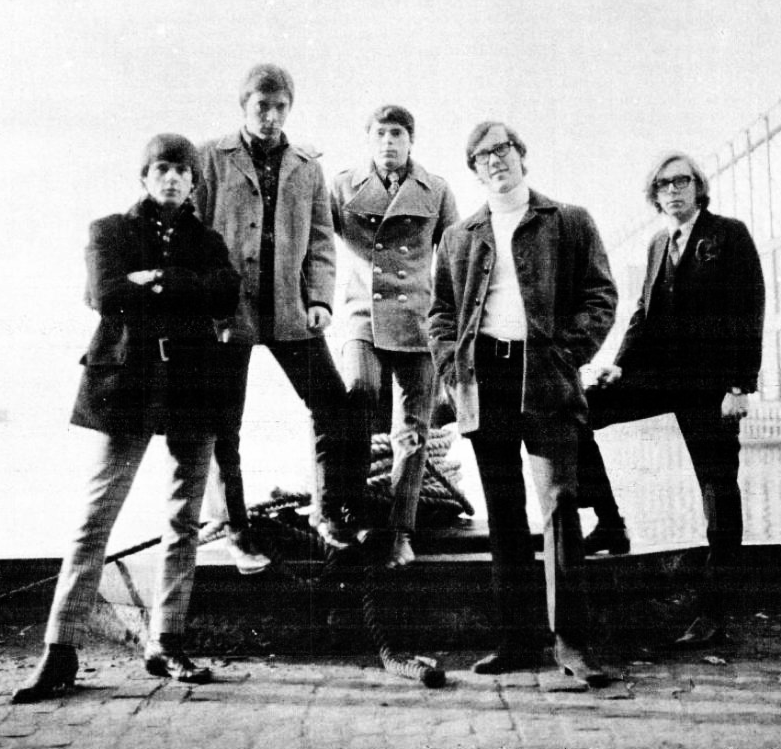
- The Critters in 1967; Left to right: Jeff Pelosi, Ken Gorka, Bob Spinella, Jim Ryan and Chris Darway

Background information
- Origin: Plainfield, New Jersey, U.S.
- Genres: Pop rock
- Years active: 1964–1967; 2007–2013
- Past members: Don Ciccone; Chris Darway; Jack Decker; Ken Gorka; Jeff Pelosi; Bob Podstawski; Jimmy Ryan; Bobby Spinella; Kurt Shanaman

The Critters were an American pop group with several hits in the 1960s, most notably "Mr. Dieingly Sad", a U.S. and Canadian Top 20 hit in 1966.

== Career ==
The group formed in Plainfield, New Jersey, United States, in 1964 when singer-guitarist Don Ciccone (February 28, 1946 – October 8, 2016) went to see the band in which a friend of his, saxophonist Bob Podstawski, was a member. This local group was the Vibratones, comprising Jimmy Ryan (lead guitar), Ken Gorka (bass), Jack Decker (drums), and Chris Darway (keyboards) along with Podstawski. Ciccone was impressed by the group and asked Podstawski if he could arrange an audition with them. The group was taken by Ciccone's playing ability and the fact that he also wrote songs. Ciccone was asked to join with the group renaming themselves "The Critters", in emulation of similar band names like the Animals.

The Critters were originally signed to Musicor Records by Jimmy Radcliffe, who also produced their first release "Georgianna" backed with "I'm Gonna Give" in 1964. They eventually signed with Kapp Records, and in 1965 recorded John Sebastian's song "Younger Girl" for their first release. The song was selected for the band by producer Artie Ripp. However, because Ciccone, Ryan, and Podstawski were then all accepted at Villanova University, the record was not completed until late 1965. "Younger Girl" became a minor pop hit in early 1966, and reached No. 38 in the UK Singles Chart in July that year. It was followed by Ciccone's song "Mr. Dieingly Sad", also produced by Ripp, which reached No. 17 later in the year, and by "Bad Misunderstanding", which reached No. 55 still later in 1966. The group had their final chart hit with "Don't Let the Rain Fall Down on Me" in 1967, at No. 39. By the time "Younger Girl" and "Mr. Dieingly Sad" had their respective chart success, Ciccone had already left the group due primarily to the Vietnam War and his draft status at the time. He had decided to join the U.S. Air Force, in which he would remain for four years, so he would have some choice as to where he would end up. Two other members of the Critters were drafted, and the remaining two members recruited new musicians and kept the Critters going for two more albums. Gorka recruited his friend, Kurt Shanaman from Mountainside, New Jersey, after proposing they get together at "Shades" a soda shop in Westfield, to discuss filling in with the band in the studio and on tour. They mutually agreed after riding in Gorka's 1967 burgundy "427" Corvette.

After recording several singles and one album (Younger Girl), the original band split up when Podstawski and Decker also joined the armed services and Darway left for art college. Ryan and Gorka then attempted to maintain the group with new members (Jeff Pelosi (drums/vocals) and Bob Spinella (keyboards)) for some time, releasing two more albums (Touch 'n Go With The Critters and Critters).

Later, Ryan recorded and toured with Carly Simon before working as a studio guitarist. Ciccone joined the Four Seasons, and he was a member of Frankie Valli and the Four Seasons (1973–81). He played guitar, bass and sang the falsetto sections of the lead vocal in the Four Seasons song "December, 1963 (Oh, What a Night)", and later toured with Tommy James and the Shondells as bassist.

Gorka became a booking agent and co-owner of The Bitter End in Greenwich Village; he died on March 20, 2015, at the age of 68.

Darway went on to form Johnny's Dance Band, a popular group in the Philadelphia area in the late 1970s, followed by the Chet Bolins Band.

Pelosi went on to pursue a songwriting career and landed a publishing agreement with Brother Records owned by The Beach Boys.

In 2007, the Critters re-formed when Ciccone was asked to join the band Skeezix, which included Albert Miller, Lenny Rocco, and Milt Koster. Their repertoire included classic hits from all the bands Ciccone was involved with (including a slightly retitled "Mr. Dieingly Sad"), as well as original and cover material. The band performed mostly on the Treasure Coast of Florida. The Critters recorded a new album, Time Pieces, which includes the updated "Mr. Dieingly Sad" and a new version of "Younger Girl". The band announced their breakup in the summer of 2013.

In 2012, Ciccone and Ryan joined former Four Seasons keyboardist Lee Shapiro and drummer Gerry Polci to form The Hit Men.

Ciccone died from a heart attack on October 8, 2016, aged 70.

== Selective singles discography ==
Year	Title	Label	Peak positions			Album
Year	Title	Label	US	CAN	UK	Album
1964	"Georgianna"	Musicor	—	—	—	Non-album singles
1965	"Children And Flowers"	Kapp	—	—	—	Non-album singles
1966	"Younger Girl"	Kapp	42	—	38	Younger Girl (1966)
1966	"Mr. Dieingly Sad"	Kapp	17	17	—	Younger Girl (1966)
1966	"Bad Misunderstanding"	Kapp	55	75	—	Non-album singles
1967	"Marryin' Kind of Love"	Kapp	111	—	—	Non-album singles
1967	"Don't Let the Rain Fall Down on Me"	Kapp	39	32	—	Non-album singles
1967	"Little Girl"	Kapp	113	—	—	Non-album singles
1967	"No One But You"	Prancer	—	—	—	Non-album singles
1967	"A Moment Of Being With You	Project 3	—	—	—	Non-album singles
1968	"Touch 'N Go"	Project 3	—	—	—	Non-album singles
1968	"Lisa, But Not The Same"	Project 3	—	—	—	Non-album singles
1969	"She Said She Loved Him"	Project 3	—	—	—	Non-album singles
