= What's Up, Tiger Lily? =

1966 film by Woody Allen, Senkichi Taniguchi

- Theatrical re-release poster
- Directed by: Woody Allen; Senkichi Taniguchi
- Written by: Woody Allen; Louise Lasser; Len Maxwell; Julie Bennett; Frank Buxton; Mickey Rose; Bryna Wilson; Hideo Andô
- Conceived by: Ben Shapiro
- Produced by: Henry G. Saperstein; Reuben Bercovitch; Tomoyuki Tanaka; Shin Mortia
- Starring: Woody Allen
- Cinematography: Kazuo Yamada
- Edited by: Richard Krown
- Music by: The Lovin' Spoonful
- Production companies: Benedict Pictures Corporation; Toho
- Distributed by: American International Pictures
- Release date: November 2, 1966
- Running time: 80 minutes
- Countries: United States; Japan
- Language: English
- Budget: ~$400,000

What's Up, Tiger Lily? is a 1966 American comedy film directed by Woody Allen in his feature-length directorial debut.

Allen took footage from a Japanese spy film, International Secret Police: Key of Keys (1965), and overdubbed it with completely original dialogue that had nothing to do with the plot of the original film. He both put in new scenes and rearranged the order of existing scenes, producing a one-hour movie from the 93 minutes of the original film. He completely changed the tone of the film from a James Bond clone into a comedy about the search for the world's best egg salad recipe.

During post-production, Allen's original one-hour television version was expanded without his permission to include additional scenes from International Secret Police: A Barrel of Gunpowder, the third film in the International Secret Police series, and musical numbers by the band the Lovin' Spoonful. The band released a soundtrack album. Louise Lasser, who was married to Allen at the time, served as one of the voice actors for the "new" dialogue soundtrack, as did Mickey Rose, Allen's writing partner on Take the Money and Run (1969) and Bananas (1971). In 2003, Image released the film on DVD, with both the theatrical and television (called "alternate") soundtracks.

== Plot ==
The plot provides the setup for a string of sight gags, puns, jokes based on Asian stereotypes, and general farce. The central plot involves the misadventures of secret agent Phil Moskowitz, hired by the Grand Exalted High Macha of Rashpur ("a nonexistent but real-sounding country") to recover a secret egg salad recipe that was stolen from him. The recipe, in the possession of gangster Shepherd Wong, is also being sought by rival gangster Wing Fat, and Moskowitz, assisted by two female Rashpur agents, temporarily teams up with Wing Fat to steal the recipe from Wong.

The movie has an ending credits scene unrelated to the plot, in which China Lee, a Playboy Playmate and wife of Allen's comic idol Mort Sahl who does not appear elsewhere in the film, does a striptease while Allen (who is also on-screen) explains that he promised he would put her in the film somewhere.

== Cast ==
- Tatsuya Mihashi as Phil Moscowitz, a secret agent and self-described "lovable rogue" (other people call him "amiable zany")
- Akiko Wakabayashi as Suki Yaki, a beautiful woman who has escaped from prison; she seduces Phil and later works alongside him as a spy
- Mie Hama as Teri Yaki, Suki's sister who helps Phil as well (cf. sukiyaki, teriyaki)
- Tadao Nakamaru as Shepherd Wong, an evil gang leader and egg salad addict who has stolen the recipe for the world's greatest egg salad.
- Susumu Kurobe as Wing Fat, an evil gangster who teams up with Phil to steal the recipe from Shepherd Wong, but plans to then sell it back to him.
- Sachio Sakai as Hoodlum
- Hideyo Amamoto as Cobra Man
- Tetsu Nakamura as Foreign Minister
- Osman Yusuf as Gambler
- Kumi Mizuno as Phil's date
- Woody Allen as Himself / Dub Voice / Projectionist
- Julie Bennett as Dub Voice
- Frank Buxton as Dub Voice
- Louise Lasser as Dub Voice
- Len Maxwell as Dub Voice
- Mickey Rose as Dub Voice
- The Lovin' Spoonful as Themselves

Both female leads appeared the following year as legitimate Bond girls in the Japan-based You Only Live Twice.

== Production ==
Producer Henry G. Saperstein had acquired the localization rights to a number of Toho films in a package deal, including International Secret Police: Key of Keys. Rather than localize Key of Keys in a traditional manner, Saperstein came up with the idea of completely re-writing the story and dubbing it as a comic mystery. The film is considered Woody Allen's directorial debut, although Allen distanced himself from it in a 2020 interview.

After the film was dubbed and edited, it was too short for most movie houses to agree to play it, so original footage featuring Allen was shot in New York to pad out the running time. The set was too noisy to record voices properly, so the voices were dubbed on later. Since Allen was unavailable to do the dubbing session for the original footage, his voice was provided by S. Richard Krown, the film's editor.

== Soundtrack album ==
What's Up, Tiger Lily?

Soundtrack album by the Lovin' Spoonful
- Released: August 1966
- Recorded: April 11–12, 1966
- Studios: National, New York City
- Genres: Folk rock; instrumental rock
- Length: 28:57
- Label: Kama Sutra
- Producer: Jack Lewis

The Lovin' Spoonful chronology
What's Shakin' (1966)	What's Up, Tiger Lily? (1966)	Hums of the Lovin' Spoonful (1966)

The soundtrack album to What's Up, Tiger Lily? was released in August 1966. It contains music by the Lovin' Spoonful. The audio engineer at National Recording Studios was Fred Weinberg, who went on to produce and engineer many other films and albums. It was re-released on CD along with You're a Big Boy Now, the Spoonful's soundtrack for the 1966 film by Francis Ford Coppola. It reached No. 126 on the Billboard Pop Albums charts.

=== Track listing ===
All tracks written by John Sebastian, Joe Butler, Steve Boone and Zal Yanovsky, except where noted.

Side one

1. "Introduction to Flick" (Woody Allen, Lenny Maxwell) – 2:03
2. "Pow (Theme From 'What's Up, Tiger Lily?')" (Sebastian, Butler, Boone, Skip Boone, Yanovsky) – 2:28
3. "Gray Prison Blues" – 2:15
4. "Pow Revisited" (Sebastian, Butler, Boone, Yanovsky, Skip Boone) – 2:30
5. "Unconscious Minuet" – 2:05
6. "Fishin' Blues" (trad., arrangement by Sebastian) – 1:58

Side two

1. "Respoken" (Sebastian) – 1:48
2. "Cool Million" – 2:20
3. "Speakin' of Spoken" (Sebastian) – 2:40
4. "Lookin' to Spy" – 2:30
5. "Phil's Love Theme" – 2:15
6. "End Title" – 4:05

=== Chart performance ===
Chart (1966)	Peak position
US Billboard Top LP's	126
US Cash Box Top 100 Albums	91
US Record World 100 Top LPs	49

== Reception ==
The reviews were mixed upon the film's release. Expressing disappointment in the movie, The New York Times stated that "the peppery English sound track wears thin as the action churns around in absolute chaos." Variety wrote, "The production has one premise – deliberately mismatched dialog – which is sustained reasonably well through its brief running time."

Aggregator Rotten Tomatoes reports 81% approval of the film from 26 reviews, with an average rating of 6.9/10.

== See also ==
- List of American films of 1966
- Mad Movies with the L.A. Connection
- Kung Pow! Enter the Fist
- Dead Men Don't Wear Plaid
