= Soon (musical) =

- Music: Joseph M. Kookoolis; Scott Fagan
- Lyrics: Scott Fagan
- Book: Scott Fagan and Joe Kookoolis; Robert Greenwald
- Productions: 1971 Broadway; 1971 Los Angeles

Soon is a rock opera with music by Joseph M. Kookoolis and Scott Fagan, lyrics by Fagan, and a book by Scott Fagan and Joe Kookoolis and Robert Greenwald. It is based on a story by Fagan and Kookoolis.

The story is about a group of young musicians who achieve success in New York City, but pay the price. It was an attack on the record industry, which apparently caused Fagan and Kookoolis to be blacklisted.

== Productions ==
The 1971 Broadway show opened on January 12 after 21 previews at the Ritz Theatre, and closed after three performances on January 13.

The show was musically directed by Louis St. Louis, set design Kert F. Lundell, costume design David Chapman, lighting design Jules Fisher, audio design Jack Shearing, vocal arrangements by Louis and Jacqueline Penn, orchestrations by Howard Wyeth and Jon Huston, additional staging by Gerald Freedman, and choreography by Fred Benjamin. The band included Louis on piano, Richard Apuzzo on guitar and electric guitar, Adam Ippolito on organ and tuba, John Trivers fender bass and guitar, and Tim Case on drums.

The original cast featured Peter Allen (Henry), Dennis Belline (Wilson Wilson), Barry Bostwick (Kelly), Pendleton Brown (Psychedelic Necktie), Angus Cairns (Record Company Executive), Joseph Campbell Butler (Neil), Nell Carter (Sharon), Paul Eichel (Record Company Executive), Scott Fagan (Kelly) Leata Galloway (Faith), Richard Gere (Michael), Marta Heflin (Annie), Del Hinkley (Record Company Executive), Michael Jason (Henry's Friend), Tony Middleton (Songwriter), John C. Nelson (Henry's Friend), Pamela Pentony (Rita), Marion Ramsey (Hope), Vicki Sue Robinson (Charity), Larry Spinelli (Record Company Executive), and Singer Williams (Henry's Friend).

== Reception ==
Martin Brookspan said "The tide of Rock musicals reaches its high water mark in Soon… an inventive, imaginative, brilliantly realized creation." Emory Lewis said "Soon is a hallelujah blessing, glorious music easily the best score of the season… I loved every rocking minute." John Schubeck said "Staggering shots of meaning. Dynamite in so many ways." In The New Yorker, Brendan Gill called the show "a disaster".

== Songs ==
=== Act I ===
- Let the World Begin Again
- In Your Hands
- I See the Light/ Gentle Sighs
- Roll Out the Morning
- Everybody's Running
- Henry Is Where It's At
- Music, Music
- Glad to Know Ya
- Rita Cheeta
- Henry's Dream Theme
- To Touch the Sky
- Everybody's Running (Reprise)
- Marketing, Marketing
- Sweet Henry Loves You
- One More Time
- Straight
- Wait

=== Act II ===
- Faces, Names and Places
- Annie's Thing
- Doing the High
- Soon
- Country Store Living
- What's Gonna Happen to Me
- On the Charts
- Molecules
- So Much That I Know
- Child of Sympathy
- Frustration
- Doing the High (Reprise)
- It Won't Be Long
