= Autosalvage =

American psychedelic rock band

- Origin: New York City, United States
- Genres: Psychedelic rock
- Years active: 1966–1968
- Labels: RCA Victor
- Past members: Tom Danaher; Darius Davenport; Rick Turner; Skip Boone

Autosalvage was an American psychedelic rock band from New York City, who recorded and released one album in 1968.

The band was started in 1966 by folk and bluegrass musician Tom Danaher, joined by multi-instrumentalist Darius Davenport, guitarist Rick Turner, and bassist Skip Boone. All came from musical backgrounds. Danaher, who took lead vocals and played rhythm guitar, had played in folk clubs with Turner, who had also performed with Ian & Sylvia. Boone was the brother of Steve Boone of The Lovin' Spoonful, and Davenport was the son of a member of New York Pro Musica and had a collection of musical instruments. The band was initially known as The Northern Lights, and, when The Lovin' Spoonful were away on tour, rehearsed in a space hired by the latter band.

They opened a show headed by The Mothers of Invention at the Balloon Farm nightclub. Frank Zappa suggested they change their name to Autosalvage — the title of one of their songs — and helped them secure a record deal with RCA Records. They recorded their only album, Autosalvage, at the RCA Studio New York with producer Bob Cullen, and it was released in early 1968. However, sales were poor, and there was relatively little work for them in the New York area. Turner's friend Jesse Colin Young suggested that they move to California, but only Turner was willing to make the move and the band split up.

Turner worked in California with The Youngbloods and The Grateful Dead before joining Alembic Inc and later starting his own business as a luthier for musicians such as Ry Cooder and Lindsey Buckingham. The other band members left the music business.

The Autosalvage album was reissued on vinyl by the Edsel label in 1988. In 2001 UK-based label Acadia Records reissued the recording on CD, with informative historical liner notes included. In 2012 the band had a feature story on NPR’s “Fresh Air," and in 2013 the band played a 40-minute slot at South by Southwest (SXSW).
