= Rick Turner (luthier) =

American builder of guitars and basses (1943–2022)

- Born: Warwick Lancelot Armstrong Turner III; July 30, 1943
- Died: April 17, 2022 (aged 78)
- Occupations: Luthier, musician
- Years active: 1969–2022
- Known for: Alembic Inc
- Website: rickturnerguitars.com

Warwick Lancelot Armstrong "Rick" Turner III, (July 30, 1943 – April 17, 2022) was an American builder of guitars and basses, ukuleles, and other stringed instruments. As a guitar builder, Turner created instruments for rock musicians including Lindsey Buckingham, John Entwistle, and Jesse Colin Young.

== Career ==
Turner grew up from the age of eight in Marblehead, Massachusetts. He started helping to make and repair musical instruments when young, and was given his first guitar at the age of 11. He attended boarding school in Rhode Island before starting at Boston University in 1962, where he started going to folk clubs and coffeehouses, and undertook guitar repairs at a store in Cambridge. He also began playing in a band called Banana and the Bunch, with Lowell "Banana" Levinger and Michael Kane, later of The Youngbloods. In 1964, the three musicians opened a music store in Martha's Vineyard, before Turner was invited to play guitar on tour with Ian & Sylvia. He also played on the duo's 1966 album, Play One More.

After the tour ended, Turner moved to New York City. He was a founding member of the psychedelic band Autosalvage, which released a self-titled album on RCA in 1968. He continued to repair guitars, and after Autosalvage split up moved to Point Reyes, California, in 1968. Turner co-founded Alembic Inc established in 1969, and was involved in the design and construction of the Alembic instruments. He founded Rick Turner Guitars in 1979 and joined Gibson in 1988 where he served as president of Gibson Labs West Coast R&D Division.

Turner left Gibson in 1992 and ran a guitar repair shop at Westwood Music in Los Angeles, where he developed piezo pickup designs, working with Jackson Browne, David Crosby, and others. He later co-founded Highlander Musical Audio, manufacturer of piezo pickups for acoustic guitars.

He continued to design and build guitars for many professional players including Lindsey Buckingham, Ry Cooder, David Lindley, and Andy Summers. He was also a regular columnist for Acoustic Guitar magazine and was a columnist for Bass Player, Frets and Guitar Player magazines. He partnered with Seymour W. Duncan to form D-TAR.

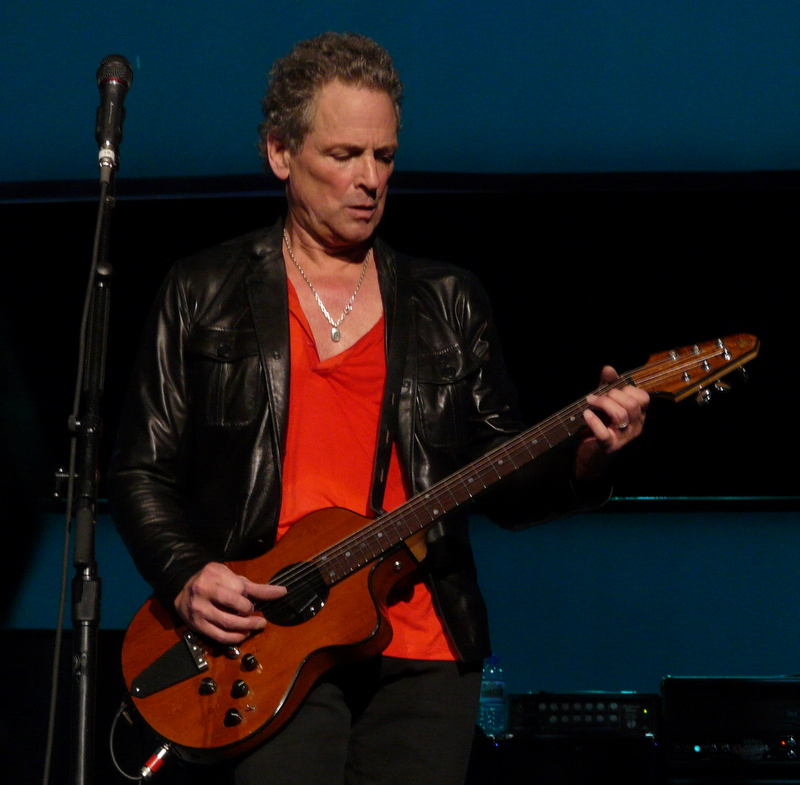
Fleetwood Mac guitarist Lindsey Buckingham playing a Rick Turner guitar

The Turner Model 1 electric was designed by Turner in 1979 for use by Fleetwood Mac guitarist Lindsey Buckingham, who continues to use the Model 1 to this day. The guitar pioneered the use of curved plates on the front and back in order to reduce standing wave hysteresis loss and the use of 18 volt preamps in an attempt to tame the 'quack' sound commonly associated with piezoelectric acoustic guitar pickups.

Turner held the patent on the graphite guitar neck, which he developed in 1976 with Geoff Gould (who then started Modulus Graphite).

Turner taught mandolin-building courses in the US and Australia and was active on a wide range of musical instrument internet forums and social media groups.

Turner died from congestive heart failure and a stroke on April 17, 2022, at the age of 78.
