= Everything Playing =

Studio album by the Lovin' Spoonful
- Released: December 6, 1967
- Studio: Mira Sound, New York City
- Genre: Folk rock
- Length: 32:23
- Label: Kama Sutra
- Producer: Joe Wissert; The Lovin' Spoonful

The Lovin' Spoonful chronology
You're a Big Boy Now (1967)	Everything Playing (1967)	Revelation: Revolution '69 (1968)

Singles from Everything Playing
- 1. "Six O'Clock" Released: April 6, 1967; 2. "She Is Still a Mystery" / "Only Pretty, What a Pity" Released: September 21, 1967; 3. "Money" / "Close Your Eyes" Released: December 1967

Everything Playing is the fourth studio album by the Canadian-American folk-rock band the Lovin' Spoonful, released in December 1967.

== History ==
Everything Playing was the first album featuring guitarist Jerry Yester (replacing Zal Yanovsky who left shortly after recording "Six O'Clock") and the last commercial album as a quartet; principal songwriter and lead singer John Sebastian would leave the group in June 1968 for a solo career. This album also features the only known track to feature bassist Steve Boone on lead vocal: "Priscilla Millionaira".

Three of the songs made the Top 40: "Six O'Clock," "She Is Still a Mystery," (both in the US and Canada) and "Money" (only in Canada). John Sebastian sang "Younger Generation" in his unscheduled appearance at Woodstock, dedicating it to an audience member whose wife or girlfriend had a baby at the festival.

The songs were recorded at Mirasound Studios in Manhattan using a prototype 16-track tape recorder which was custom built for the studio by Ampex. This was one of the earliest recordings to use 16-track technology.

Everything Playing was re-issued on CD in 2003 with three bonus tracks — alternate versions of songs from the original recording.

== Reception ==
Professional ratings
Review scores
Source	Rating
Allmusic	3/5 stars
Rolling Stone	(negative)
Encyclopedia of Popular Music	3/5 stars
MusicHound Rock	3/5
Uncut	4/5 stars

In his Allmusic review, music critic William Ruhlman wrote of the album "When Sebastian wasn't at the mic, the singing could be mediocre, and the group was often all over the map in its attempt at musical sophistication, but the record was saved by Sebastian's writing and singing."

== Track listing ==
All songs by John Sebastian unless otherwise noted.

Side one

1. "She Is Still a Mystery" – 3:00
2. "Priscilla Millionaira" – 2:20
3. "Boredom" – 2:23
4. "Six O'Clock" – 2:38
5. "Forever" (Instrumental by Steve Boone) – 4:24

Side two

1. "Younger Generation" – 2:40
2. "Money" – 2:01
3. "Old Folks" (Joe Butler) – 3:04
4. "Only Pretty, What a Pity" (Butler, Jerry Yester) – 3:04
5. "Try a Little Bit" – 3:04
6. "Close Your Eyes" (Sebastian, Yester) – 2:44

== Personnel ==
- John Sebastian – vocals, guitar, cover art
- Steve Boone – bass, vocals
- Joe Butler – drums, percussion, vocals
- Jerry Yester – guitar, banjo, vocals, keyboards
- Zal Yanovsky – guitar on "Six O'Clock"

== Sources ==
- Boone, Steve; Moss, Tony (2014). Hotter Than a Match Head: My Life on the Run with The Lovin' Spoonful. Toronto: ECW Press. ISBN 978-1-77041-193-7 – via Google Books.
- Ruppli, Michel; Novitsky, Ed, eds. (1998). The MGM Labels: 1961–1982. Westport, Connecticut: Greenwood Publishing Group. ISBN 978-0-313-30779-9 – via Google Books.
