= Revelation: Revolution '69 =

1968 studio album by the Lovin' Spoonful

Studio album by the Lovin' Spoonful featuring Joe Butler
- Released: October 7, 1968
- Genre: Pop
- Length: 32:06
- Label: Kama Sutra
- Producers: Bob Finiz, Chip Douglas

The Lovin' Spoonful chronology
Everything Playing (1967)	Revelation: Revolution '69 (1968)	The Very Best of the Lovin' Spoonful (1970)

Singles from Revelation: Revolution '69
- 1. "Never Goin' Back" Released: June 5, 1968; 2. "(Till I) Run with You" / "Revelation: Revolution '69" Released: August 20, 1968; 3. "Me About You" / "Amazing Air" Released: c. January 1969

Revelation: Revolution '69 is the fifth and final studio album by the Lovin' Spoonful, released on October 7, 1968. Though credited as the Lovin' Spoonful featuring Joe Butler, the album is mostly Butler, the band's drummer, playing with session musicians.

Following John Sebastian's departure from the Lovin' Spoonful in June 1968, the remaining members of the band had little contact with one another. Butler received permission from executives at Kama Sutra Records to record and produce an album under the band's name, which he did without the involvement of either Steve Boone or Jerry Yester. The album did not chart, and it is generally omitted from lists of the Lovin' Spoonful's discography.

== History ==
Revelation: Revolution '69 is the final studio album by the group. It features Joe Butler as lead singer on most tracks, following the departure of former lead vocalist and songwriter John Sebastian. Almost all the songwriting for the album is divided fairly equally amongst three songwriting teams: Garry Bonner and Alan Gordon (notable for their earlier compositions for The Turtles); Ralph Dino and John Sembello; and producer Bob Finiz and Joe Butler. Butler also wrote one song on his own. The album also included "Never Going Back", which was written by John Stewart and had been released in 1968 as a single.

Revelation: Revolution '69 was reissued on CD in 2008, in Japan only, with three bonus tracks—two edited versions of the title track, and the remixed single edit of "Me About You". It was also reissued in 2011 in the UK as part of the box set The Lovin' Spoonful: Original Album Classics. Both reissues include three bonus tracks.

== Composition ==
Revelation: Revolution '69 is primarily a pop album. One of the album's major set-pieces is the seven-minute "War Games", a sound collage that juxtaposes sounds of warfare with the Pledge of Allegiance and the patriotic song "My Country, 'Tis of Thee". One reviewer described it as a mix of "dogs barking, babies crying, guns firing and kids playing". Further exhibiting the album's use of social commentary, the title track comments that "the prize they give to men who kill is a statue in the park." According to one reviewer, Butler uses the song to exhort to all "to wake up in contemporary language".

== Critical reception ==
Professional ratings
Review scores
Source	Rating
AllMusic	2/5 stars
Billboard	4/4 stars
Encyclopedia of Popular Music	1/5 stars
MusicHound Rock	1/5

Reviewing the album for the British music magazine New Musical Express, the critic Richard Greene disparaged the album when compared to the Lovin' Spoonful's previous output. He concluded that the only valuable elements of the LP were the track "Only Yesterday" and "the nude lady on the cover". Don Heckman of Stereo Review praised the recording and sound quality, but panned the music for being unlike "the original Spoonful". He noted that, due to ego problems, rock groups often splinter after a year or two riding "the crest of popularity", with the Lovin' Spoonful being an example. He wrote that "Sebastian's departure, in particular, has diminished the group's performing skills and the quality of its material", and commented that Butler had failed to "put together a group that in any way approaches the light-hearted joie de vivre of the original Spoonful."

Cash Box described the album as "a mixture of pop tunes and social comment", and believed that it "could see appreciable sales activity". In their review, RPM Weekly said the album should bring the Lovin' Spoonful "back into prominence". Record World highlighted Butler for being the "nominal head of the group" since John Sebastian departed for a solo career. The magazine believed "War Games" to be one of the album's "main attractions". Billboard hailed it as one of their four-star albums, one of five popular music LPs to receive the rating that month.

Retrospectively, Gary Mollica of AllMusic gave the album two out of five stars, saying "Just when everybody had written them off after Sebastian's departure, this flawed gem came out of left field," and praising the songs "Never Going Back" and, to a lesser extent, "Run With You" while strongly criticizing the tracks that Joe Butler wrote, especially "War Games." Mojo contributor Dave DiMartino wrote that Revelation: Revolution '69 contained the Lovin' Spoonful's final two singles and "a memorable album sleeve depicting Butler and a woman, both naked, and a lion, running", but believed that Sebastian's absence was "notable".

== Track listing ==
Side one

1. "Amazing Air" (Bonner, Gordon) – 2:50
2. "Never Going Back" (John Stewart) – 2:48
3. "The Prophet" (Finiz, Butler) – 2:45
4. "Only Yesterday" (Dino, Sembello) – 2:43
5. "War Games" (Butler) – 7:02

Side two

1. "(Till I) Run With You" (Gordon, Bonner) – 2:52
2. "Jug of Wine" (Dino, Sembello) – 2:31
3. "Revelation: Revolution '69" (Butler, Finiz) – 2:29
4. "Me About You" (Bonner, Gordon) – 3:48
5. "Words" (Dino, Sembello) – 2:18
