= Mr. Dieingly Sad =

1966 song by the Critters

- US picture sleeve

Single by the Critters

from the album Younger Girl
- B-side: "It Just Won't Be That Way"
- Released: August 1966
- Length: 2:39
- Label: Kapp
- Songwriter: Don Ciccone
- Producer: Artie Ripp

The Critters singles chronology
"Younger Girl" (1966)	"Mr. Dieingly Sad" (1966)	"Bad Misunderstanding" (1966)

"Mr. Dieingly Sad" is a 1966 song by the Critters. It was written by Don Ciccone, who also provides the lead vocals. The song was the second of two singles released from their album Younger Girl, the other being the title track.

"Mr. Dieingly Sad" reached number 17 in both the United States and Canada to become the group's most successful record.

== Chart history ==
Chart (1966)	Peak position
Canada RPM Top Singles	17
U.S. Billboard Hot 100	17
U.S. Cash Box Top 100	14
