= Renaissance (The Association album) =

Studio album by the Association
- Released: November 1966
- Recorded: October 10 – November 3, 1966
- Studios: United Western, Hollywood
- Genres: Folk-rock, psychedelic pop
- Length: 29:18
- Labels: Valiant, Warner Bros.
- Producer: Jerry Yester

The Association chronology
And Then... Along Comes the Association (1966)	Renaissance (1966)	Insight Out (1967)

Singles from Renaissance
- 1. "Pandora's Golden Heebie Jeebies" Released: November 1966; 2. "No Fair at All" Released: Early 1967

Professional ratings
Review scores
Source	Rating
Allmusic	3/5 stars

Renaissance is the second album by the Association. This was their last album recorded for the Valiant Records label, and was reissued by Warner Bros. Records after the company acquired Valiant. The album peaked at #34 on the Billboard Top LPs albums chart.

Although it had no chart toppers like the LPs that came before and after it, two singles reached the Billboard Hot 100 chart. "Pandora's Golden Heebie Jeebies" reached #35 in late 1966 and "No Fair at All" peaked at #51 in early 1967.

The single version of "No Fair at All" featured overdubbed vocals by Jim Yester, while early pressings of the LP featured the same track with re-recorded vocals and no overdubs. This was replaced on later copies with the single version.

In 1967, Warner Bros. absorbed the Valiant label and reissued this album along with the group's first album, And Then...Along Comes The Association. However, unlike the first album's reissue, all known Warner Bros. copies of Renaissance were issued in original, unaltered album covers in which all Valiant identifications were kept intact.

== Track listing ==
Side one

1. "I'm the One" (Russ Giguere) – 2:35 (lead vocal: Giguere)
2. "Memories of You" (Jim Yester) – 2:15 (lead vocal: Yester)
3. "All Is Mine" (Terry Kirkman) – 3:13 (lead vocal: Kirkman)
4. "Pandora's Golden Heebie Jeebies" (Jules Alexander) – 2:45 (lead vocal: Alexander)
5. "Angeline" (Alexander, Kirkman) – 3:10 (lead vocal: Kirkman)
6. "Songs in the Wind" (Ted Bluechel, Jr.) – 2:35 (lead vocal: Bluechel)

Side two

1. "You May Think" (Alexander, Kirkman) – 1:45
2. "Looking Glass" (Alexander) – 2:05 (lead vocal: Giguere)
3. "Come to Me" (Alexander, Yester) – 2:15 (lead vocal: Alexander & Yester)
4. "No Fair at All" (Yester) – 2:35 (lead vocal: Yester)
5. "You Hear Me Call Your Name" (Alexander, Kirkman) – 2:18
6. "Another Time, Another Place" (Alexander) – 1:47 (lead vocal: Giguere)

== Personnel ==
According to the 2011 deluxe expanded mono edition:

=== The Association ===
- Jules Alexander – lead and grunt guitar, koto, lead vocals
- Ted Bluechel, Jr. – drums (pig skins), door slam, percussive afterthoughts (bells, maracas, cash register), lead vocals
- Brian Cole – lower tonal concepts and bass honk, background vocals
- Russ Giguere – guitar, noise and rhythm things, lead vocals
- Terry Kirkman – recorder, flugelhorn, tambourine, piano, and other percussive embellishments, lead vocals
- Jim Yester – guitar, piano, harpsichord, bells, lead vocals

=== Technical ===
- Jerry Yester – producer
- Henry Lewy – engineer
- Peter Whorf Graphics – album design

== Charts ==
Year	Chart	Position
1967	US Billboard Top LPs	34
