= You're a Big Boy Now (album) =

Soundtrack album by the Lovin' Spoonful
- Released: March 1967
- Recorded: October 1966
- Genre: Folk rock
- Length: 26:35
- Label: Kama Sutra
- Producer: Erik Jacobsen

The Lovin' Spoonful chronology
The Best of the Lovin' Spoonful (1967)	You're a Big Boy Now (1967)	Everything Playing (1967)

Singles from You're a Big Boy Now
- 1. "Darling Be Home Soon" Released: February 1967

You're a Big Boy Now is the second soundtrack album by the Canadian-American folk-rock band the Lovin' Spoonful. Released in March 1967, it contains music from the Francis Ford Coppola film of the same name. Composed entirely by Spoonful member John Sebastian, it contains several songs performed by the band, as well as instrumental music from the film score.

It was re-released on CD along with What's Up, Tiger Lily?, the Spoonful's soundtrack for the 1967 Woody Allen film.

== Reception ==
The songs "Darling Be Home Soon" and "You're a Big Boy Now" were released as singles on the Kama Sutra label. Although the album and title-track single were not popular, "Darling Be Home Soon" was a hit, reaching #15 on the U.S. charts and #8 on the Canadian charts, and inspiring cover versions by many other artists.

Professional ratings
Review scores
Source	Rating
AllMusic	3/5 stars
MusicHound Rock	2/5

Music critic William Ruhlmann wrote of the album, "Most of the rest of the score consisted of instrumentals, many augmented by an uncredited orchestra, but Sebastian's title song was also impressive."

== Track listing ==
All songs by John Sebastian.

Side one

1. "You're a Big Boy Now" – 2:28
2. "Lonely (Amy's Theme)" – 3:19
3. "Wash Her Away (From the Discotheque)" – 2:31
4. "Kite Chase" – 1:21
5. "Try and Be Happy" – 1:04
6. "Peep Show Percussion" – 1:19
7. "Girl, Beautiful Girl (Barbara's Theme)" – 2:23

Side two

1. "Darling Be Home Soon" – 3:34
2. "Dixieland Big Boy" – 1:13
3. "Letter to Barbara" – 0:59
4. "Barbara's Theme (From the Discotheque)" – 1:26
5. "Miss Thing's Thang" – 1:02
6. "March" – 2:28
7. "The Finale" – 2:28
