= Younger Girl =

- Danish picture sleeve

Single by the Critters

from the album Younger Girl
- B-side: "Gone for Awhile"
- Released: April 1966
- Genre: Sunshine pop
- Length: 2:27
- Label: Kapp
- Songwriter(s): John Sebastian
- Producer(s): Artie Ripp

The Critters singles chronology
"Younger Girl" (1966)	"Mr. Dieingly Sad" (1966)

Alternative release
- Side A of the US single

"Younger Girl" is a song written by John Sebastian and originally recorded by his band, the Lovin' Spoonful, for their 1965 debut album Do You Believe in Magic. The tune and lyric are based upon "Prison Wall Blues" (1930) by Cannon's Jug Stompers.

Two versions charted in the U.S., both released in 1966. The American pop group the Critters' version (Kapp 752), the title track from their debut LP, reached number 42 on Billboard's Hot 100 and number 21 on the Cash Box Top 100, peaking on both charts on July 9. On the UK Singles Chart, it reached number 38. The song was also covered by the West Coast studio group and surf act The Hondells (Mercury 72563), peaking July 2, at number 52 Billboard and number 38 Cash Box.

Swedish pop group the Jackpots released "Younger Girl" as their debut single in 1966. Backed by "Dancing In the Street", this version competed with the Critters rendition on the Swedish record charts in December 1966. The Jackpots version was outperformed, and peaked at number 13 on Tio i Topp.

== Chart performance ==
The Critters version

Chart (1966)	Peak position
Australia (Kent Music Report)	18
Sweden (Tio i Topp)	10
UK	38
U.S. Billboard Hot 100	42
U.S. Cash Box Top 100	21

The Hondells version

Chart (1966)	Peak position
Canada RPM 100	11
U.S. Billboard Hot 100	52
U.S. Cash Box Top 100	38

The Jackpots version

Chart (1966)	Peak position
Sweden (Tio i Topp)	13
