= Darling Be Home Soon =

- US picture sleeve

Single by the Lovin' Spoonful

from the album You're a Big Boy Now soundtrack
- B-side: "Darlin' Companion"
- Released: February 1967
- Recorded: October 1966
- Genre: Folk rock
- Length: 3:32
- Label: Kama Sutra
- Songwriter: John Sebastian
- Producer: Erik Jacobsen

The Lovin' Spoonful singles chronology
"Nashville Cats" (1966)	"Darling Be Home Soon" (1967)	"Six O'Clock" (1967)

Audio
- "Darling Be Home Soon" on YouTube

"Darling Be Home Soon" is a song written by John Sebastian of the Lovin' Spoonful for the soundtrack of the 1966 Francis Ford Coppola film You're a Big Boy Now. It appeared on the Lovin' Spoonful's 1967 soundtrack album You're a Big Boy Now. Sebastian performed his composition at Woodstock; it was the fourth song out of the five he performed at the 1969 music festival in White Lake, New York.

== Writing and recording ==
Coppola commissioned Sebastian to write music for the film, and for one scene wanted a song with a similar mood and tempo to "Monday, Monday" by the Mamas and the Papas. Sebastian said that he wrote the song as "pleas for a partner to spend a few minutes talking before leaving.... [but] you never knew if the other person was actually there listening or was already gone". Coppola approved the song, and it was recorded by the band but with session musician Billy LaVorgna rather than Joe Butler on drums. The arrangement was by Artie Schroeck. After the recording was completed and the musicians left, the producer, Erik Jacobsen, discovered that an engineer had mistakenly erased Sebastian's vocal track, so he had to re-record it the next day. Sebastian said: "What you hear on the record is me, a half hour after learning that my original vocal track had been erased. You can even hear my voice quiver a little at the end. That was me thinking about the vocal we lost and wanting to kill someone." It has been described as "...one of the most heartfelt songs about being away from a loved one, written from the point of view of a musician on the road writing a letter."

Billboard described the song as a "medium-paced rock ballad given that 'extra special' Lovin' Spoonful treatment" and should be a "smash" on the Billboard Hot 100. The critic Richard Goldstein, one of the earliest champions of the Spoonful, criticized the song as the band's first disappointing single. In his review for The Village Voice, he disparaged the song as a tribute to Bob Dylan which "lacks the master's raunchiness". The Beatles regularly praised the Spoonful in interviews, but when Paul McCartney reviewed the latest singles for Melody Maker in February 1967, he criticized "Darling Be Home Soon" for its instrumentation, which he thought "very ordinary" and "corny". While complimenting Sebastian's vocal, McCartney hypothesized that the film studio pressured the band to keep the song's arrangement "flimsy".

== Personnel ==
According to John Sebastian:

The Lovin' Spoonful

- John Sebastian – vocals, acoustic guitar
- Zal Yanovsky – electric guitar
- Steve Boone – bass guitar

Additional musicians

- Bill LaVorgna – drums
- David "Fathead" Newman – saxophone
- Artie Schroeck – arrangement
- Clark Terry – flügelhorn
- Unidentified session musicians – orchestra

== Charts ==
Weekly chart performance
Chart (1967)	Peak position
Canada Top Singles (RPM)	8
Netherlands (Veronica Top 40)	15
Netherlands (Hilversum 3 Top 30)	16
UK (Disc and Music Echo) (Note: The single debuted at number 34 on Disc and Music Echo's Top 50 chart for the week ending March 25, 1967. In the magazine's next issue, the editors condensed their chart to a Top 30, and the single did not appear on it.)	34
UK (Melody Maker)	45
UK (Record Retailer)	44
US Billboard Hot 100	15
US Cash Box Top 100	15
US Record World 100 Top Pops	11

== Other recordings of the song ==
- 1967 – Bobby Darin, whose version reached number 93 on the US charts and number 17 in Canada.
- 1972 – The Association on their album Waterbeds in Trinidad!, which reached number 104 on the US Billboard Bubbling Under Hot 100, number 90 on the US Cashbox chart, and number 61 in Canada.
- 1993 – The Barra MacNeils on their album Closer to Paradise, number 23 Canadian charts, and Let Loose (1996, number 65 UK as a single, and on the album Rollercoaster).
- 1972 - Slade, on their album Slade Alive!, the first live album by the British rock band Slade. The album was released on 24 March 1972 and reached No. 2 on the UK Albums Chart, remaining in the chart for 58 weeks.
