= Joe Butler =

American musician

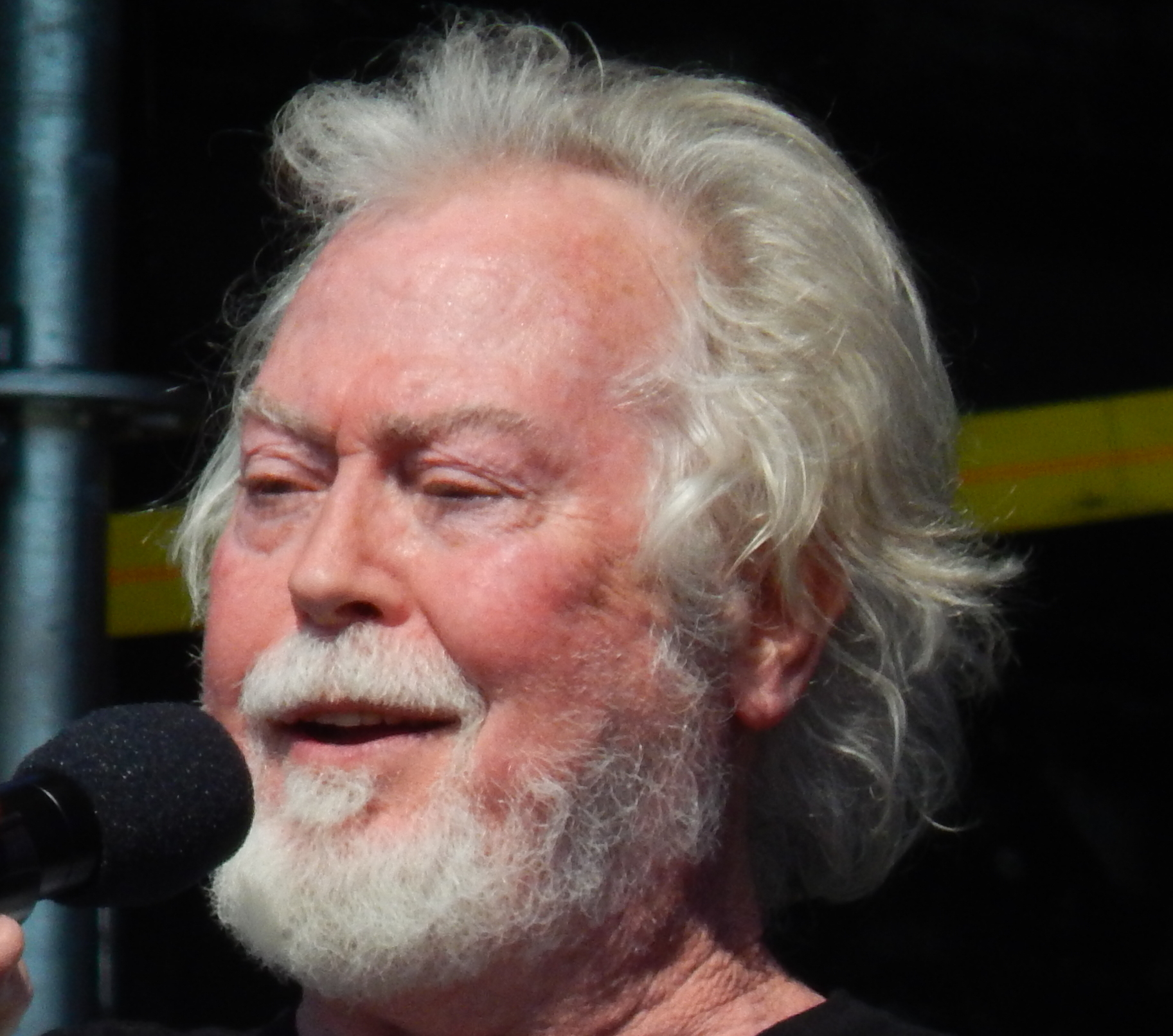
- Butler in 2016
- Born: Joseph Campbell Butler; September 16, 1941 (age 85); Long Island, New York, U.S.
- Occupations: Musician, actor
- Works: Hair, Soon
- Spouse: Kim Ablondi
- Children: Yancy Butler
- Musical career
- Genres: Rock, psychedelic rock, pop
- Instruments: Drums, vocals, autoharp, acoustic guitar, percussion
- Years active: 1964–present
- Member of: The Lovin' Spoonful

Joseph Campbell Butler (born September 16, 1941) is an American drummer, singer and actor. He is best known as a member of folk-rock band The Lovin' Spoonful, where he was drummer and later lead vocalist; the group had seven top 10 hits between 1965 and 1966. Outside of his work in music, he is a theater and television actor best known for the musicals Soon and Hair.

== Early life ==
Joeseph Campbell Butler was born on September 16, 1941, in Long Island, New York. He began playing drums at age 10 and started playing professionally at 13. During his teen years Butler formed several bands that gigged throughout the Northeast.

Butler later joined the Air Force, where he met future Lovin' Spoonful bandmate Steve Boone and his brother Skip. After leaving the military in 1963, Butler, Skip and Steve formed a group called The Kingsmen (not to be confused with another band of the same name), serving as drummer and vocalist. The Kingsmen changed their name to the Sellouts and began playing in New York City.

== Career ==
=== The Lovin' Spoonful ===
In 1964 Butler joined The Lovin' Spoonful, founded by John Sebastian and Zal Yanovsky. Butler replaced original drummer Jan Carl after their first gig at the Night Owl in Greenwich Village. After signing with Kama Sutra Records, the band released its debut album Do You Believe in Magic in 1965. The Lovin' Spoonful's biggest hits are "Do You Believe in Magic", "Summer In The City" and "Darling Be Home Soon". Butler sang lead vocals on "You Baby", "Full Measure", "Never Going Back", "Only Pretty, What A Pity" and "Me About You".

In 1967 Yanovsky left and was replaced by Jerry Yester. The same year, the group released Everything Playing, the first album to feature Yester and last to include Sebastian. Sebastian left the band in 1968, and Butler became lead vocalist for their final album, Revelation: Revolution '69. The album was recorded without Boone or Yester, instead featuring Butler and session musicians. The album performed poorly and after its release, Butler dissolved the Lovin' Spoonful and pursued an acting career.

In 1980 Butler reunited with the original line up of John Sebastian, Zal Yanovsky and Steve Boone, to appear in the movie One-Trick Pony. In 1991, Butler reunited with Steve Boone and Jerry Yester and the band resumed touring. In this incarnation of the band, Butler acted as frontman by singing and playing autoharp, percussion and acoustic guitar. In 2000, the original lineup reunited a final time and was inducted into the Rock and Roll Hall of Fame. In 2006, Butler and the Lovin' Spoonful were inducted into the Vocal Group Hall of Fame .

In 2020, Butler performed at a fundraiser for autism research with John Sebastian and Steve Boone for the first time since their induction into the Rock and Roll Hall of Fame.

=== Acting ===
Butler landed his first major role in the 1971 rock opera Soon, playing the character of Neil. He next replaced James Rado in the lead role of Claude, joining the original Broadway cast of Hair. Butler created the role of Alaska Wolf Joe for the off-Broadway production of the Brecht-Weill social opera the Rise and Fall of the City of Mahagonny. In 2002 Butler appeared on Yancy's show Witchblade. This was Butler's first time acting on TV.

Butler is a founding member of the Circle Theatre Company. Alongside award-winning and renowned director Marshall W. Mason and Pulitzer Prize winning playwright Lanford Wilson, Butler has written and directed numerous theater projects, including a play called Hearts in the City.

== Personal life ==
Butler married theater manager Leslie Vega on September 2, 1967. He later divorced her and married Kim Ablondi. His daughter from his first marriage is actress Yancy Butler, star of the television series Mann & Machine and South Beach, as well as films Hard Target and Drop Zone.
