= Steve Boone =

American bass guitarist (born 1943)

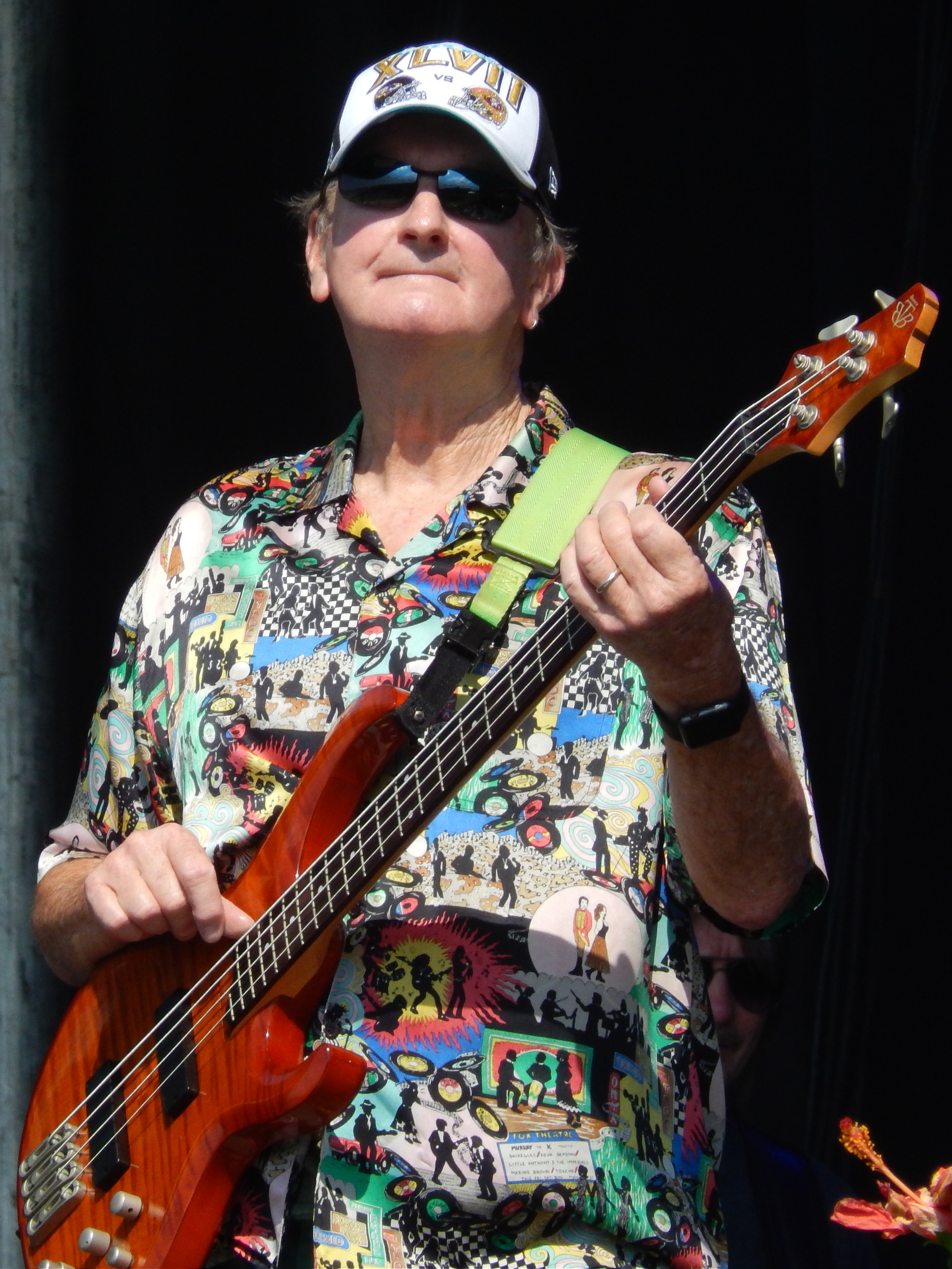
- Boone playing bass onstage in 2016

Background information
- Born: September 23, 1943 (age 82); Camp Lejeune, North Carolina, United States
- Genres: Rock, pop rock
- Occupations: Musician, producer
- Instruments: Bass, vocals, guitar, keyboards
- Years active: 1964–present
- Member of: The Lovin' Spoonful
- Website: https://www.steveboone.net/index.html

John Stephen Boone (born September 23, 1943) is an American bass guitarist and music producer, best known as a member of the American folk-rock group the Lovin' Spoonful. Boone co-wrote two of the groups' biggest hits, "You Didn't Have to Be So Nice" and "Summer in the City". He was the owner of Blue Sea Studios, a recording studio used by Little Feat, Robert Palmer and many other artists.

Boone joined the Lovin' Spoonful in 1964, played bass and keyboards for the band and wrote songs with John Sebastian. He stayed with the band until it broke up in 1969. In 1991 Boone rejoined the Lovin' Spoonful with founding member Joe Butler upon its reformation, and has remained in the band since. Boone was inducted into the Rock and Roll Hall of Fame as a member of the band in 2000, Boone played with the original line up once more, when he was inducted into the Vocal Group Hall of Fame in 2006.

Boone has produced several albums by many artists including Forq, Irish Times and the Oxpetals.

== Early life ==
Boone was born to a military family in Camp Lejeune, the Marine base where his father served during the Second World War, and grew up in North Carolina, St. Augustine, Florida, and Westhampton, New York. His older brother, Skip, was also a musician, who played with Autosalvage.

His mother bought him a Gibson acoustic guitar as a teenager in 1960, after he was injured in a car crash:

I was in a very bad car crash on the last night of my junior year of high school in East Hampton. I was out celebrating with one of my friends and we hitchhiked home. We dropped my friend off at his house, and on the way to my house the driver crashed into a tree. My injuries were so severe that I was going to be laid up on a sofa for at least 18 months where I wouldn’t be able to do any of my normal activities, so my mom bought me a guitar.

While he and his brother Skip were in the Air Force, they met Joe Butler, with whom Steve later performed in the Lovin' Spoonful. The three formed a group called the Kingsmen (not the group of the same name known for "Louie Louie"). Steve was originally the group's rhythm guitarist, but switched to bass after their bass player moved to Louisiana.

== The Lovin' Spoonful ==
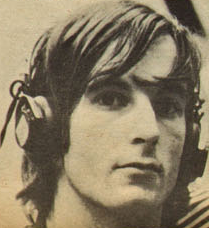
Headshot of Boone in 1967

In Greenwich Village, Manhattan, John Sebastian and Zal Yanovsky formed the Lovin' Spoonful. Boone first met Sebastian and Yanovsky in December 1964:

In December 1964, I was in New York City picking up my motorcycle that I had shipped back from Europe where I had spent the previous 3 months riding around. Once in New York, my brother Skip and band mate Joe Butler suggested I go and meet John Sebastian and Zal Yanovsky at a music club in Greenwich Village. There they proposed that we start a band and get a record deal, and so the story begins of the Lovin' Spoonful.

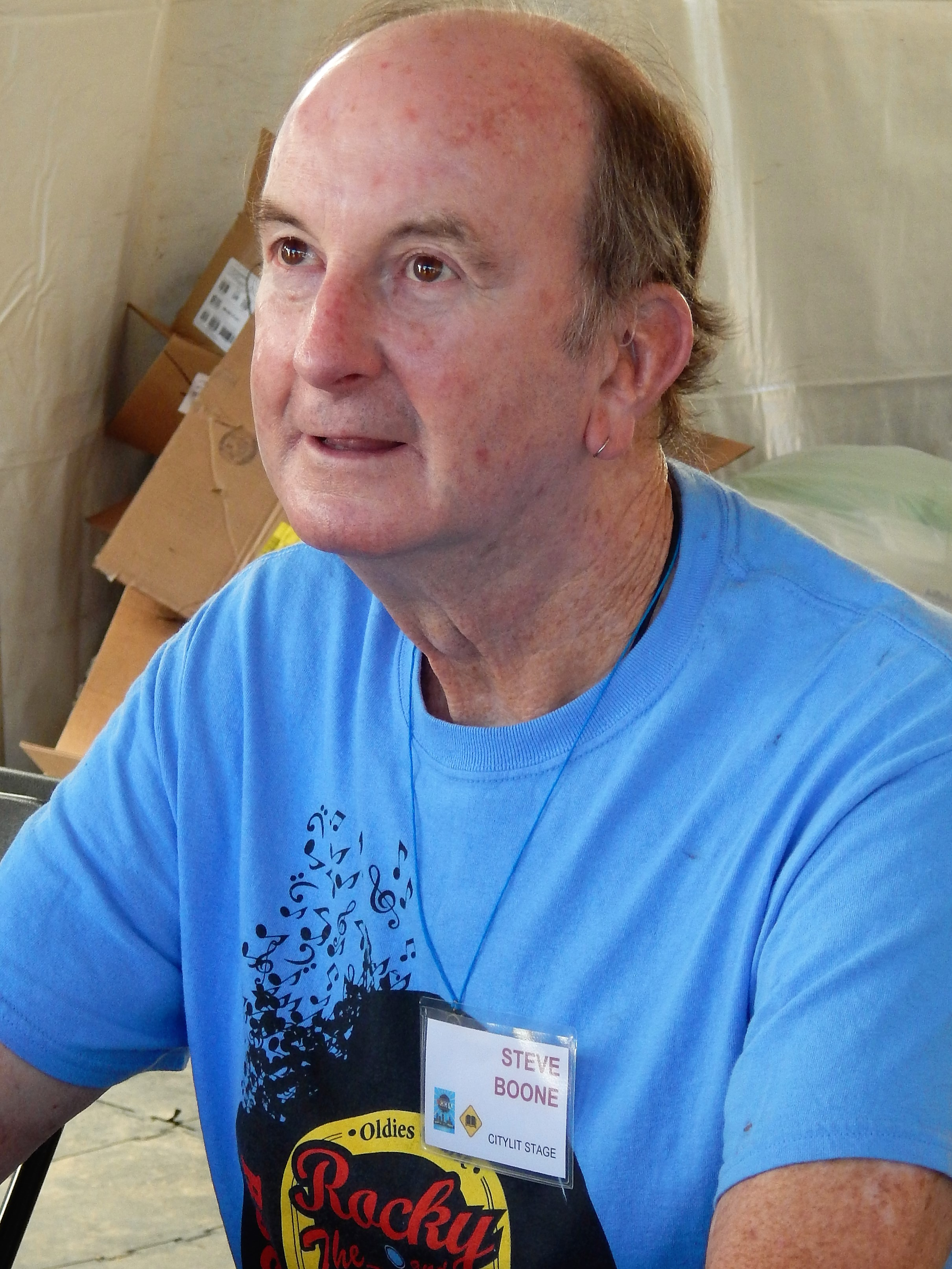
Boone in 2014

Boone and Jan Carl were invited into the group, but Carl was replaced by Joe Butler after only one gig. The group made its first recordings for Elektra Records in early 1965 and agreed in principle to sign a long-term deal with Elektra in exchange for a $10,000 advance. However, Kama Sutra Records had an option to sign the Lovin' Spoonful as recording artists as part of a previously signed production deal, and Kama Sutra exercised the option upon learning of Elektra's intent to sign the band.

The Lovin' Spoonful's hits included "Do You Believe in Magic", "Summer in the City" (the group's only Number 1 single, for three weeks in August 1966), "Daydream", "Did You Ever Have to Make Up Your Mind?", "Darling Be Home Soon", and "You Didn't Have to Be So Nice". Boone co-wrote "You Didn't Have to Be So Nice" (a song that has been cited as an inspiration for the composition of the 1966 song "God Only Knows" by the Beach Boys), as well as "Summer in the City". Steve wrote at least one song on every Spoonful album except the last one, Revelation: Revolution '69.

In 1980, Boone, Sebastian, Yanovsky and Butler reunited to appear in Paul Simon's movie One-Trick Pony. In the early 1990s Boone joined Joe Butler, Jerry Yester and Jim Yester to resume the Lovin' Spoonful's concert touring. As of 2019, Boone and Butler continue touring with Mike Aturi on Drums, Phil Smith on guitar, and Murray Weinstock on keyboards.

Boone was inducted into the Rock and Roll Hall of Fame in 2000 as a member of the Lovin' Spoonful, and played during the ceremony with the other original members for the last time. The group was also inducted into the Vocal Group Hall of Fame in 2006.

Boone wrote the book Hotter Than a Match Head: My Life on the Run with The Lovin’ Spoonful in 2014.

Boone played bass on the vocal group The Cherry Drops’ cover versions of "You Didn't Have to Be So Nice" and "Sweet Lovin’".

== Other works ==
After the Lovin' Spoonful disbanded in 1969, Boone producing an album by the Oxpetals for Mercury Records. That same year he started work on a solo album, but soon scrapped it.

In 1993 he produced the Irish Times' album Live At McGuire's Hill 16, and in 1998 produced the pop rock band Forq's album Forq Chops.

== Blue Seas Studios ==
In 1973, after three years of living on a sailboat, he returned to the United States to visit a friend, who was recording at ITI. While visiting ITI, Boone was asked by studio management if he’d be interested in the facility, to which Boone accepted. The studio recorded works by Robert Palmer, Emmylou Harris and Little Feat, among many other artists.

He sold his boat and moved to Baltimore, Maryland and bought ITI, which he renamed to Blue Seas Studios. His first project was recording Little Feat's Feats Don't Fail Me Now album.

Boone sold the studio sometime later.

== Personal life ==
Sometime in 1970, Boone bought a 56 ft sailboat 'Cygnus' and moved onto it in the Virgin Islands. During his time living on the Virgin Island sailboat, Boone started secretly smuggling marijuana from the Caribbean to the United States, something he would later be arrested for.

Boone moved back to Florida in 1987, and still currently lives there. Steve is married to Lena Boone and lived on an 11 acre farm in Southport, North Carolina. They have since also purchased a second home in Leland, North Carolina.

Boone’s older brother, Skip, later of the band Autosalvage, died in 2015.
