= Tarzana Kid =

Studio album by John Sebastian
- Released: September 9, 1974
- Genre: Pop, rock
- Length: 29:57
- Label: Reprise
- Producer: Erik Jacobsen, John Sebastian

John Sebastian chronology
The Four of Us (1971)	Tarzana Kid (1974)	Welcome Back (1976)

Tarzana Kid is the third studio album by the American singer-songwriter John Sebastian. Released in 1974, the album marked the first collaboration between Sebastian and Erik Jacobsen, the Lovin' Spoonful's original producer, since their falling out in 1967. The album was a commercial failure and did not chart. His next album which featured "Welcome Back" was his last for the Reprise label.

== Reception ==
Professional ratings
Review scores
Source	Rating
Allmusic	2.5/5 stars
Robert Christgau	C−
Encyclopedia of Popular Music	4/5 stars
Mojo	4/5 stars
MusicHound Rock	4/5

In his retrospective Allmusic review, critic William Ruhlmann wrote "while this sounds like a hodgepodge, John Sebastian manages to pull it off with his usual aplomb."

== Reissues ==
Tarzana Kid was reissued on CD in 2007 by Collectors' Choice Music and in 2008 by Rhino Entertainment.

== Track listing ==
All songs written by John Sebastian except where noted.

Side one

1. "Sitting in Limbo" (Jimmy Cliff, Gully Bright) – 3:29
2. "Friends Again" – 2:28
3. "Dixie Chicken" (Lowell George, Fred Martin) – 3:49
4. "Stories We Could Tell" – 3:09
5. "Face of Appalachia" (Lowell George, John Sebastian) – 4:20

Side two

1. "Wildwood Flower" (Traditional) – 1:43
2. "Wild About My Lovin'" – 3:05
3. "Singing the Blues" (Melvin Endsley) – 2:22
4. "Sportin' Life" (Traditional) – 3:09
5. "Harpoon" – 2:23

== Personnel ==
Musicians

- John Sebastian – vocals, guitar, autoharp, banjo, marimba, harmonica, dulcimer
- Lowell George – slide guitar, guitar, harmony vocals
- Jim Gordon – drums
- Kenny Altman – bass
- Milt Holland – drums
- Amos Garrett – guitar
- Russell DaShiell – guitar
- Richie Olson – clarinet
- The Pointer Sisters – backing vocals
- Bobbye Hall – congas
- Jerry McKuen – guitar
- Buddy Emmons – pedal steel guitar
- Emmylou Harris – backing vocals
- Kelly Shanahan – drums
- David Lindley – fiddle
- David Grisman – mandolin
- Ry Cooder – mandolin, slide guitar
- Phil Everly – backing vocals
- Ron Koss – guitar

Production

- Erik Jacobsen – producer
- John Sebastian – producer
- Donn Landee – engineer
- John Boyd – engineer
- Peter Granet – engineer
- Steve Jarvis – engineer
- David Paich – string arrangement
