= Paul Rishell and Annie Raines =

Paul Rishell and Annie Raines are an acoustic, country blues-inspired musical duo. They met in 1993 during the recording of Paul's album Swear to Tell the Truth, and have released four albums as a duo, I Want You To Know, Moving To The Country, Goin' Home, and 2008's live A Night In Woodstock, which was also released in a DVD version containing interviews, guitar lessons, and commentary. Moving to the Country won the Blues Music Award for 'Acoustic Blues Album of the Year' in 2000.

Raines is primarily known for her harmonica playing, but also plays mandolin, zither, and keyboard instruments. Rishell's primary instrument is guitar, and both sing on their recordings.

They have also recorded and performed as members of John Sebastian's J-Band, and appeared on the soundtrack to A Prairie Home Companion. They appeared in the jug band documentary Chasin' Gus' Ghost.

== Separate work ==
Raines played on Susan Tedeschi's first three albums, was a member of the Tarbox Ramblers, and worked with Pinetop Perkins, Louis Myers, and James Cotton among others, and has taught at the Club Passim school of music.

Rishell's debut album was 1990's Blues on a Holiday. In 2008, he released a guitar instructional video disc, Dirt Road Blues, and he has taught at Berklee College of Music.

In 2013, Rishell was nominated for two Blues Music Awards. First in the Acoustic Album category for his album, Talking Guitar, and also for Acoustic Artist.

== Discography ==
- I Want You To Know (1996)
- Moving to the Country (2000)
- Goin' Home (2004)
- A Night In Woodstock (2008)
