= John Sebastian Live =

Live album by John Sebastian
- Released: September 1970
- Recorded: July 1970, Woodstock, New York
- Genres: Folk, rock
- Length: 33:35
- Label: MGM
- Producer: none credited

John Sebastian chronology
John B. Sebastian (1970)	John Sebastian Live (1970)	Cheapo-Cheapo Productions Presents Real Live John Sebastian (1971)

John Sebastian Live is a recording of a concert by the American singer-songwriter John Sebastian. Recorded in July 1970, it was released that September by MGM Records.

The album is noteworthy as it was only available for sale for about two months in 1970, making it a relative rarity in Sebastian's catalog. MGM, for whom Sebastian had recorded (via a distribution arrangement with Kama Sutra Records) as a member of the Lovin' Spoonful during 1965-68, released the album after Sebastian had left MGM/Kama Sutra to sign with Warner Bros. Records' Reprise Records subsidiary as a solo artist. Contending that Sebastian still owed them an album according to the terms of his Lovin' Spoonful contract, MGM released both Sebastian's debut solo album John B. Sebastian and John Sebastian Live during 1970 without authorization from Sebastian or his management. Warner Bros. Records sued MGM for copyright infringement following MGM's release of John B. Sebastian (which Warner/Reprise had already issued in January 1970), ultimately resulting in MGM's pulling their releases of the two Sebastian albums from the market. John Sebastian Live has not been reissued by any record label since it was withdrawn by MGM in late 1970.

Despite its limited release, John Sebastian Live briefly placed on the U.S. Billboard Top LPs chart, peaking at #129.

== Background ==
John Sebastian left the Lovin' Spoonful in early 1968 to pursue a solo career. He recorded his debut album John B. Sebastian under the auspices of the Lovin' Spoonful's label Kama Sutra Records (whose releases were distributed by MGM), and Kama Sutra released the first single taken from the album, "She's a Lady" b/w "The Room Nobody Lives In," in December 1968. Before John B. Sebastian could be released, however, Kama Sutra terminated its distribution agreement with MGM, and temporarily suspended operations. At about this same time in early 1969, the Lovin' Spoonful, whose records were not successful following Sebastian's leaving the band, also disbanded. In response to these events, MGM contacted Sebastian and his manager saying that they wanted to release John B. Sebastian on the MGM label, but rebranded as a Lovin' Spoonful record – a proposal that Sebastian rejected as "incredibly dishonest." With Kama Sutra Records inactive, Sebastian and his management approached Warner Bros./Reprise Records and quickly reached agreement on a five-album commitment, with Sebastian's new label purchasing his Kama Sutra contract and the master tapes to John B. Sebastian as part of the deal. Reprise ultimately released the album in January 1970 (catalog no. RS 6379) .

Shortly after Reprise released John B. Sebastian, MGM released the album on their label as well (catalog no. SE-4654), containing the same songs and sequence but with different artwork. Warner/Reprise quickly sued MGM for copyright infringement over their issuing a recording they no longer had contractual rights to; MGM claimed in response that the Lovin' Spoonful’s owing them an album, plus the marketing support they gave to the Kama Sutra single release of "She's a Lady," gave them the right to release John B. Sebastian despite the artist’s no longer being associated with them. The lawsuit was adjudicated in Warner/Reprise's favor in late 1970, but not before MGM released John Sebastian Live (MGM catalog no. SE-4720) in September 1970. MGM's precise rationale for releasing John Sebastian Live while Warner/Reprise's lawsuit was still in progress was not publicized. A possible explanation for the timing of the album's release, however, might be that, while the courts might have insisted that MGM withdraw their version of John B. Sebastian given Reprise's prior release of that album, the release of John Sebastian Live might be allowed to stand if it was found that Sebastian still owed MGM an album.

Both MGM’s version of John B. Sebastian and John Sebastian Live were ultimately pulled from the marketplace in late 1970 upon settlement of Warner/Reprise’s suit. John Sebastian Live was not reissued, but Sebastian, assisted by producer Paul A. Rothchild and musical director Paul Harris, would quickly record a live album as Sebastian’s second Reprise project (Cheapo-Cheapo Productions Presents Real Live John Sebastian, Reprise catalog no. MS 2036, released March 1971).

== Packaging and content ==
While MGM's packaging of John B. Sebastian featured a gatefold cover including multiple photos and detailed liner notes, John Sebastian Live's packaging was limited; in particular, no producer credit was listed for the album, no venue information or recording dates were provided, and its songwriter credits were incorrect. It is not known whether the album's shoddy packaging was a by-product of its being rushed to market – the album appeared in the marketplace only two months after it was recorded – or if the packaging was intended as an artistic statement, in a manner similar to The Who's Live at Leeds album released about three months earlier. Despite the album's credits omissions, Allmusic cites its recording time frame as July 1970. Sebastian has derisively referred to John Sebastian Live as "The White Album" due to its stark packaging.

The album features Sebastian in solo performance at an outdoor venue that Sebastian has identified as being in Woodstock, New York. Sebastian would subsequently explain that the performance was hastily arranged:

I had a performance [at] what we called the Swamp Festival [in] New Orleans. [My wife] Catherine and I went, and Mountain did it, so I was there with my old pal Felix Pappalardi, and we were having a jolly good time. Somewhere around like eight or nine in the evening, somebody said, 'You know, we've got 300 people in a field in Woodstock.' Somebody, I forget who it was, couldn't do it. 'Could you come and play a set tomorrow morning for these people?' So it involved immediately jumping onto a series of planes, kind of all-night style. This is not how you'd prepare for a live album that you really wanted to represent yourself with ... We go to a little field [...] in Woodstock — I'm not entirely sure where it is, even though I've lived here for over 30 years ... As far as an indication of 'how is Sebastian after you keep him up all night and throw him out on stage and see if he can stay on his feet' — okay, maybe it's pretty good on that level. But that's about the only level it's good, because I would have prepared much more.

Sebastian accompanies himself on electric guitar on all but two of the album's selections. The recording is of professional quality, apparently taken on a direct feed from the show's soundboard, but is marred on some selections by feedback, which Sebastian attributes to "a cheapo-cheapo [...] Fender Champ ... the worst amplifier in life!" Audience members ignite firecrackers during some selections; during one such instance, Sebastian quips "Happy Fourth!", perhaps suggesting the show's approximate performance date.

The album's program features five songs from John B. Sebastian, along with songs that Sebastian performed during his tenure with the Lovin' Spoonful.

== Track listing ==
Although the cover and labels of John Sebastian Live read "all songs written by John Sebastian," only eight of the album's eleven songs are original compositions wholly written by Sebastian. Accurate composer credits are listed below.

=== Side 1 ===
1. "Lovin' You" (Sebastian) – 2:35
2. "You're a Big Boy Now" (Sebastian) – 3:15
3. "She's a Lady" (Sebastian) – 2:06
4. "Magical Connection" (Sebastian) – 2:52
5. "Younger Generation" (Sebastian) – 2:54

=== Side 2 ===
1. "Coconut Grove" (Sebastian, Zal Yanovsky) – 2:02
2. "My Gal" (Traditional, arranged by John Sebastian) – 2:31
3. "Fishin' Blues" (Traditional, arranged by John Sebastian) – 2:41
4. "I Had a Dream" (Sebastian) – 2:54
5. "Red-Eye Express" (Sebastian) – 3:53
6. "Darling Be Home Soon" (Sebastian) – 2:23 (edit; faded out during the song's instrumental bridge)

== Personnel ==
- John Sebastian – vocals, acoustic guitar (on "Lovin' You" and "Darlin' Be Home Soon"), electric guitar (on all other selections), harmonica (on a short passage between "Red-Eye Express" and "Darlin' Be Home Soon")
