= John Sebastian =

American singer-songwriter and musician (born 1944)

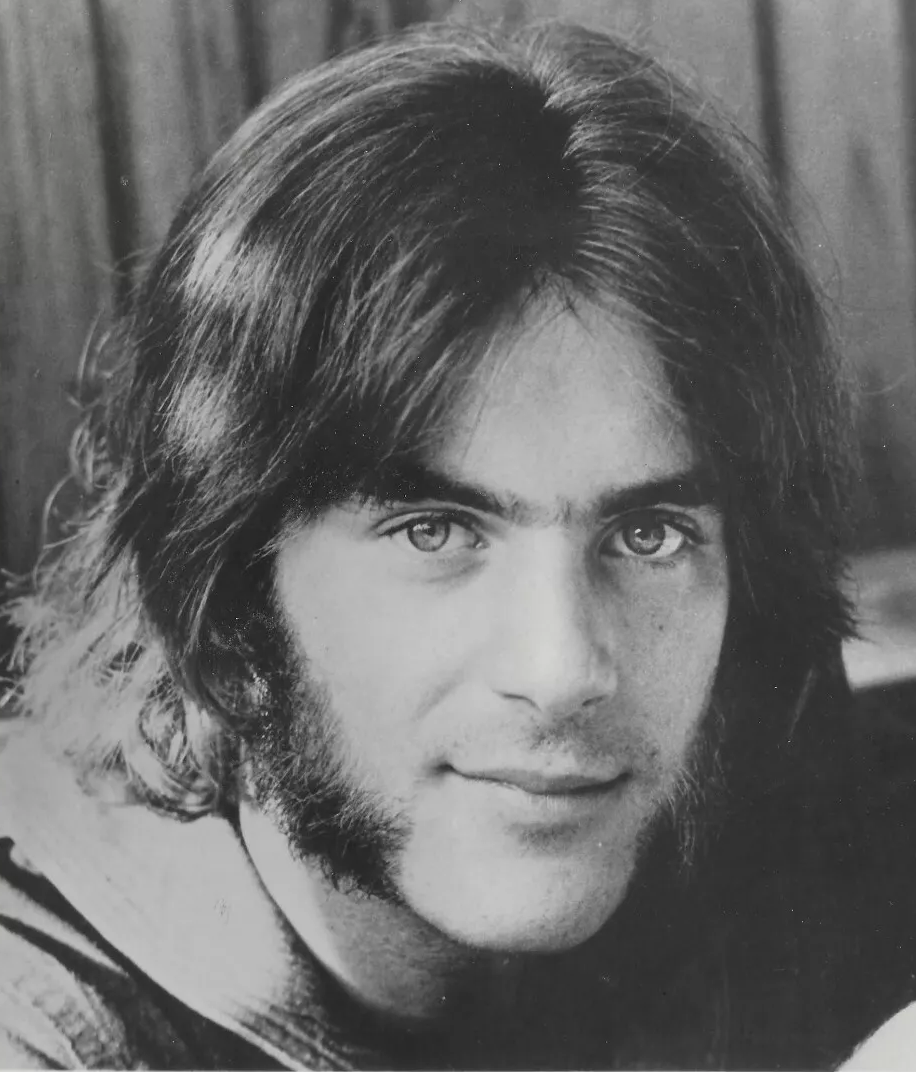
- Sebastian in 1971

Background information
- Also known as: Giovanni Pugliese
- Born: John Benson Sebastian; March 17, 1944 (age 82); New York City, U.S.
- Genres: Rock; pop; folk; blues
- Occupations: Singer; musician; songwriter
- Instruments: Vocals; guitar; harmonica; autoharp
- Years active: 1964–present
- Labels: Kama Sutra; Reprise
- Formerly of: The Lovin' Spoonful; Even Dozen Jug Band; The Mugwumps
- Website: johnbsebastian.com

John Benson Sebastian (born March 17, 1944) is an American singer, songwriter and musician who founded the rock band the Lovin' Spoonful in 1964 with Zal Yanovsky. During his time in the Lovin' Spoonful, Sebastian wrote and sang some of the band's biggest hits such as "Do You Believe in Magic", “Summer in the City”, "Did You Ever Have to Make Up Your Mind", and "Daydream". Sebastian left the Spoonful after the 1968 album Everything Playing to focus on a solo career, releasing John B. Sebastian in 1970.

He made an impromptu appearance at the Woodstock festival in 1969 and scored a U.S. No. 1 hit in 1976 with "Welcome Back", which was used as the theme song on the sitcom Welcome Back, Kotter.

Sebastian was inducted into the Rock and Roll Hall of Fame in 2000 as a member of the Lovin' Spoonful.

== Early life ==
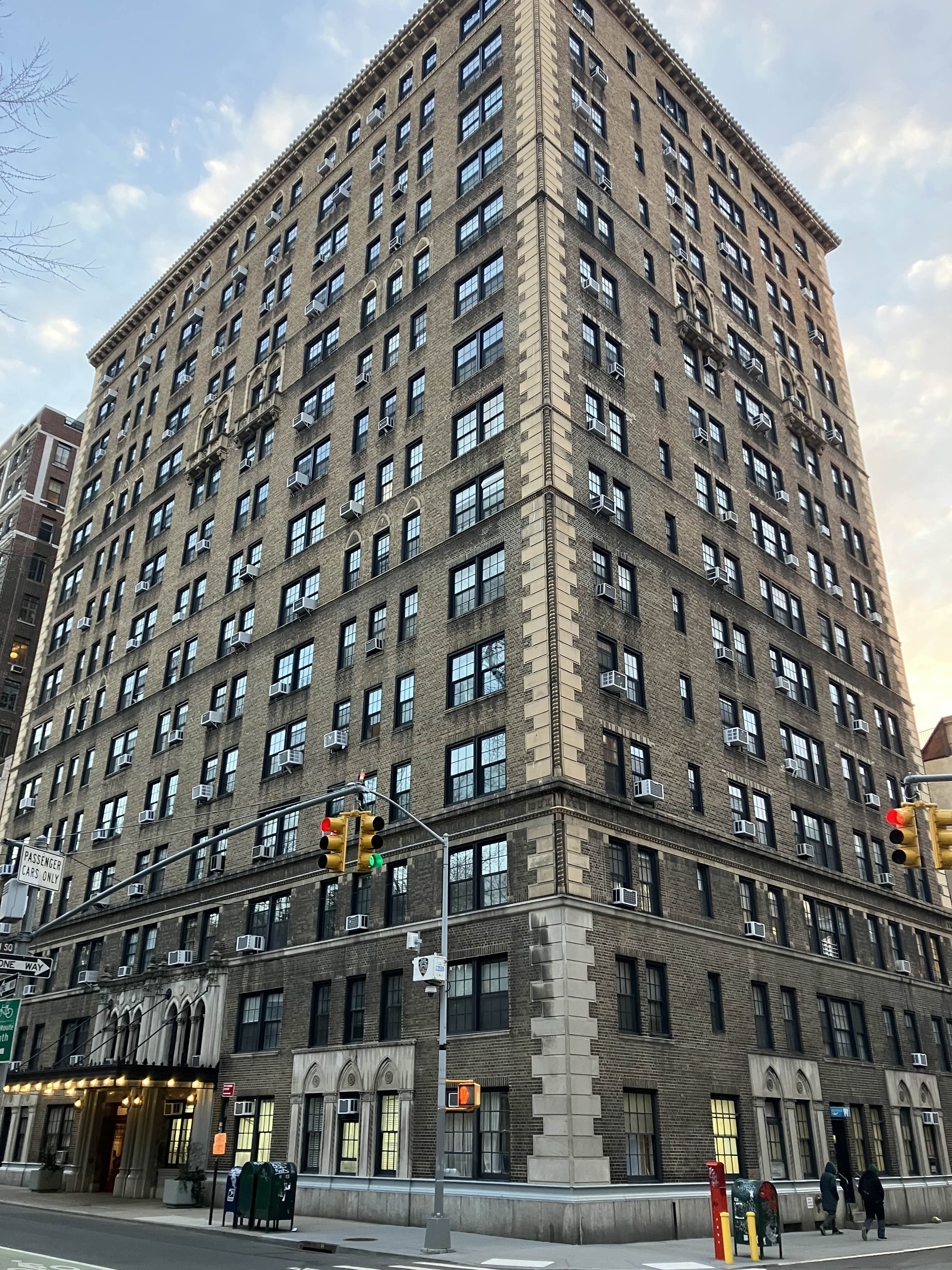
Sebastian grew up at 29 Washington Square West (pictured 2025), an apartment building in Greenwich Village, New York, which overlooks Washington Square Park.

Sebastian was born in New York City and grew up in Little Italy and Greenwich Village. His father, John Sebastian (né John Sebastian Pugliese), was a noted classical harmonica player, and his mother, Jane (born Mary Jane Bishir), was a radio script writer. His godmother was the actress Vivian Vance, who was a close friend of his mother. His godfather and first babysitter was children's book illustrator Garth Williams, a friend of his father. Eleanor Roosevelt was a neighbor who lived across the hall.

Sebastian grew up surrounded by music and musicians, including Burl Ives and Woody Guthrie, and hearing such players as Lead Belly and Mississippi John Hurt in his own neighborhood. He graduated from Blair Academy, a private boarding school in Blairstown, New Jersey, in 1962. He next attended New York University for just over a year, but dropped out as he became more interested in musical pursuits.

== Early career ==
In the early 1960s, Sebastian developed an interest in blues music and in playing harmonica in a blues style, rather than the classical style of his father. Through his father's connections, he met and was influenced by blues musicians Sonny Terry and Lightnin' Hopkins (for whom Sebastian served as "unofficial tour guide and valet" when Hopkins was in New York City). Sebastian became part of the folk and blues scene that was developing in Greenwich Village, which in part later gave rise to folk rock.

In addition to harmonica, Sebastian played guitar and occasionally autoharp. One of Sebastian's first recording gigs was playing guitar and harmonica for Billy Faier's 1964 album The Beast of Billy Faier. He also played on Fred Neil's album Bleecker & MacDougal and Tom Rush's self-titled album in 1965. He played in the Even Dozen Jug Band and in the Mugwumps, which split to form the Lovin' Spoonful and the Mamas & the Papas. Bob Dylan invited him to play bass on his Bringing It All Back Home sessions (though Sebastian's parts, from the first day of the recording session, did not appear on the album) and to join Dylan's new electric touring band, but Sebastian declined in order to concentrate on his own project, the Lovin' Spoonful.

== The Lovin' Spoonful ==
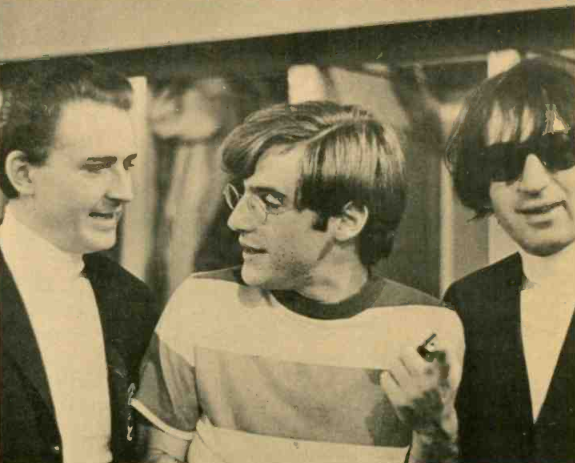
Sebastian in August 1965, flanked by the disc jockeys Reb Foster (left) and B. Mitchel Reed

Sebastian was joined by Zal Yanovsky, Steve Boone, and Joe Butler in the Spoonful, which was named after "The Coffee Blues," a Mississippi John Hurt song. The Lovin' Spoonful, which blended folk-rock and pop with elements of blues, country, and jug band music, became part of the American response to the British Invasion, and was noted for such hits as "Do You Believe in Magic", "Jug Band Music", "You Didn't Have to Be So Nice", "Daydream", "Did You Ever Have to Make Up Your Mind?", "Summer in the City", "Rain on the Roof", "Nashville Cats", "Darling Be Home Soon", and "Six O'Clock".

The band, however, began to implode after a 1966 marijuana bust in San Francisco involving Boone and Yanovsky, a Canadian citizen. Facing deportation, they revealed the name of their dealer to police, which caused a fan backlash and added to the internal tension already created by the diverging interests of the band members. Neither Sebastian nor Butler were involved in the matter, both being away from San Francisco at the time. Yanovsky subsequently left the band and was replaced by Jerry Yester, after which the band's musical style veered away from its previous eclectic blend and became more pop-oriented.

Sebastian would reunite with the band in 1980 and appear in the film One-Trick Pony. He would later be inducted into the Rock and Roll Hall of Fame in 2000, this was the last time Sebastian would play with the original line up.

In 2020 Sebastian reunited with Lovin Spoonful members Joe Butler and Steve Boone.

== Solo career 1960s–1970s ==
=== Broadway musical composer ===
One of Sebastian's first projects after leaving the Spoonful was composing the music and lyrics for a play with music, Jimmy Shine, written by Murray Schisgal. It opened on Broadway in December 1968, with Dustin Hoffman in the title role, and ran until April 1969, for a total of over 150 performances. In the late 1970s and early 1980s, Sebastian wrote a stage musical adaptation of E.B. White's Charlotte's Web in consultation with his godfather Garth Williams, who illustrated White's original book. The proposed musical included 20 songs, some of which Sebastian performed in concert, but the musical was never produced.

=== Woodstock appearance ===
In August 1969, Sebastian made an unscheduled appearance at Woodstock. He traveled to the festival as a spectator, but was asked to appear when the organizers suddenly needed an acoustic performer after a rain break because they couldn't set up amps on stage for Santana until the water was swept off. Sources that have tried to reconstruct the Woodstock running order differ on the exact time and position of Sebastian's unplanned set, with some stating that he played on Saturday, August 16, immediately after Country Joe McDonald; others saying that on that Saturday, Santana followed McDonald and Sebastian appeared after Santana; and still others, including McDonald, recalling that Sebastian actually played on Friday, August 15, at some point after Richie Havens opened the festival.

Sebastian's Woodstock set consisted of three songs from his recorded but not yet released John B. Sebastian album ("How Have You Been", "I Had a Dream", and "Rainbows All Over Your Blues") and two Lovin' Spoonful songs ("Darling Be Home Soon" and "Younger Generation", which he dedicated to a newborn baby at the festival). Documentary remarks by festival organizers indicated that Sebastian was under the influence of marijuana or other psychedelic drugs at the time, hence his spontaneity and casual, unplanned set. Sebastian has confirmed in later interviews that he was a regular marijuana user at the time and had taken acid at Woodstock because he was not scheduled to perform. However, he has also noted that "there was a natural high there [at Woodstock]," and that "[i]n an interview it is the easy thing to say 'yeah, I was really high,' but it was actually a very small part of the event. In fact, I had a small part of some pill that someone gave me before I went on stage, but it wasn't a real acid feeling." Sebastian appeared on the original Woodstock album and in the documentary film. Twenty-five years later, he returned for Woodstock '94, playing harmonica for Crosby, Stills and Nash and appearing with his own band, the J-Band.

In September 1969, a month after Woodstock, Sebastian performed a similar set of solo and Spoonful material at the 1969 Big Sur Folk Festival and was featured in the subsequent documentary Celebration at Big Sur (1971).

=== Major-label solo recordings ===
In January 1970, Sebastian released the first in a series of solo LPs on Reprise Records (a label owned by Warner Bros. Records), his eponymous solo debut, John B. Sebastian, on which he was accompanied by various Los Angeles musicians including Crosby, Stills & Nash. It was Sebastian's highest-charting solo album, reaching No. 20 in the Billboard album charts. In a contract dispute with MGM Records, MGM, without authorization from Sebastian or his management, also released the John B. Sebastian album with a different cover, and a live album, John Sebastian Live; both were later withdrawn from the market. Sebastian's second Reprise album, Cheapo Cheapo Productions Presents Real Live John Sebastian, was hastily recorded in an effort to provide an authorized live album.

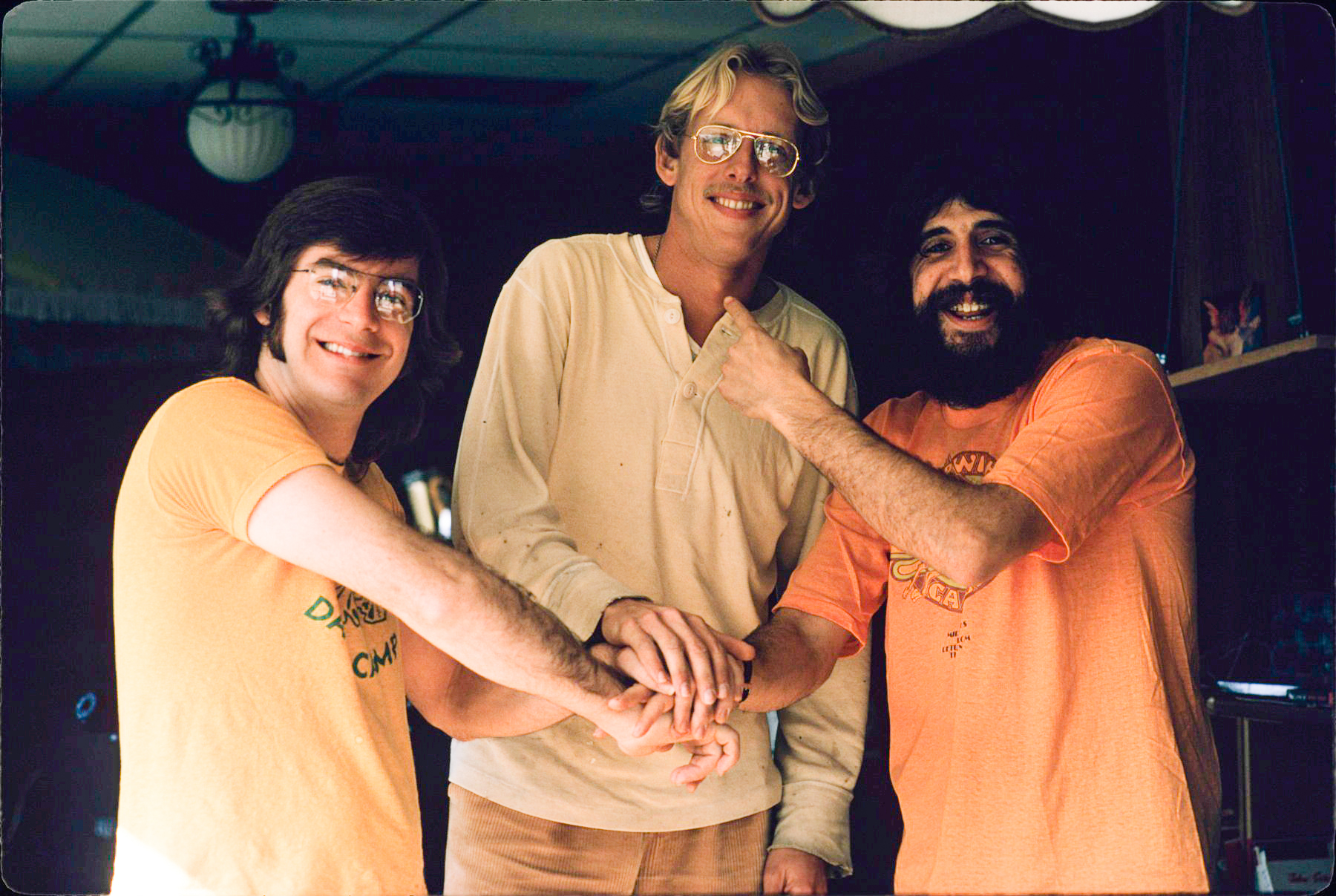
Sebastian in 1974 with Erik Jacobsen (center) and Zal Yanovsky (right)

For his third Reprise album, The Four of Us (1971), Sebastian used a core backing band consisting of keyboardist Paul Harris, drummer Dallas Taylor and bassist Kenny Altman. He considered forming a permanent band with them, but Harris and Taylor chose to join Stephen Stills's band Manassas. In 1972, Sebastian also released a non-LP single, "Give Us a Break" b/w "Music for People Who Don't Speak English", which did not chart. On his next album, Tarzana Kid (1974), Sebastian returned to using a rotating group of well-known recording artists and session musicians, including Lowell George (who also co-wrote, with Sebastian, the album track "Face of Appalachia"), Phil Everly, Emmylou Harris, the Pointer Sisters, David Grisman, Russell DaShiell, Ry Cooder and Buddy Emmons. Sebastian, George and Everly also briefly considered forming a supergroup but abandoned the idea.

Sebastian has stated that his musical career suffered in the early 1970s from being out of step with the trends set by emerging artists such as Alice Cooper, and that he made more money by buying and selling real estate than he did from his music. After Tarzana Kid failed to chart, Sebastian sought a release from his Reprise contract, which required him to make one more album. However, in 1976, Sebastian had an unexpected No. 1 single with "Welcome Back", the theme song to the sitcom Welcome Back, Kotter, causing the label to rush the production of an album, also titled Welcome Back. Despite the "monster hit" status of the song "Welcome Back", Sebastian expressed frustration that Reprise did not do more to promote the associated album, his last for Reprise. His later albums have been released primarily on independent record labels. The song, Sebastian's only top-40 solo hit, found new life 28 years later when a sample from it became the hook for rapper Mase's 2004 hit "Welcome Back".

In 2001, Rhino Entertainment re-released all five of Sebastian's Reprise albums, plus the non-LP "Give Us a Break" single, on CD in a limited-edition box set entitled Faithful Virtue: The Reprise Recordings. The box set also included live recordings of Sebastian's entire Woodstock performance and six previously unreleased songs recorded in mono from a performance at the Winterland Ballroom in San Francisco on October 4, 1969. In 2006, Sebastian's five Reprise albums were reissued as individual CDs by Collectors' Choice Music, with new liner notes by Richie Unterberger.

=== Session work ===
During the 1960s and 1970s, Sebastian guested on a number of recordings by other artists. He played harmonica with the Doors on the song "Roadhouse Blues" (from the album Morrison Hotel), under the pseudonym G. Pugliese to avoid problems with his contract and to avoid association with Jim Morrison, who was then facing trial on charges of lewd behavior after the Miami concert incident. He also appeared on two Doors live albums, playing on "Little Red Rooster" on Alive, She Cried and on seven songs on Live in Detroit. Both albums were later re-released, remastered, and repackaged into one single album, In Concert, and included Morrison's introduction of Sebastian to the stage on the "Little Red Rooster" track.

Sebastian is credited with playing three instruments on the 1970 Gordon Lightfoot album, Sit Down Young Stranger (Reprise RS 6392). He played autoharp on "Saturday Clothes", electric guitar on "Baby It's Allright", and harmonica on "The Pony Man". The album was later retitled If You Could Read My Mind when the song of that name unexpectedly became a major hit.

Sebastian is credited with playing harmonica on Crosby, Stills, Nash & Young's song "Déjà Vu" from the album of the same name. He had previously been asked by Crosby, Stills & Nash to join their group as a fourth member, but turned them down, leading to their association with Neil Young. In 1977 he recorded as part of Artie and Happy Traum's Woodstock Mountain Revue (a.k.a. Woodstock Mountains) folk collaboration for the album More Music from Mud Acres. Other records on which Sebastian appeared include the album Stephen Stills (1970), Timothy Leary's album You Can Be Anyone This Time Around (1970) (on which Sebastian jammed with Jimi Hendrix), and Keith Moon's only solo album, Two Sides of the Moon (1975). He also played the autoharp instrumental break between the second and third verses of Randy VanWarmer's 1979 hit "Just When I Needed You Most".

== Later career ==
Since the 1980s, Sebastian has been active in several music-related areas, not only writing and performing his own material but also performing roots music, developing soundtrack and instructional material, hosting and appearing on television programs, and writing a children's book about a harmonica-playing bear.

=== Live performances ===
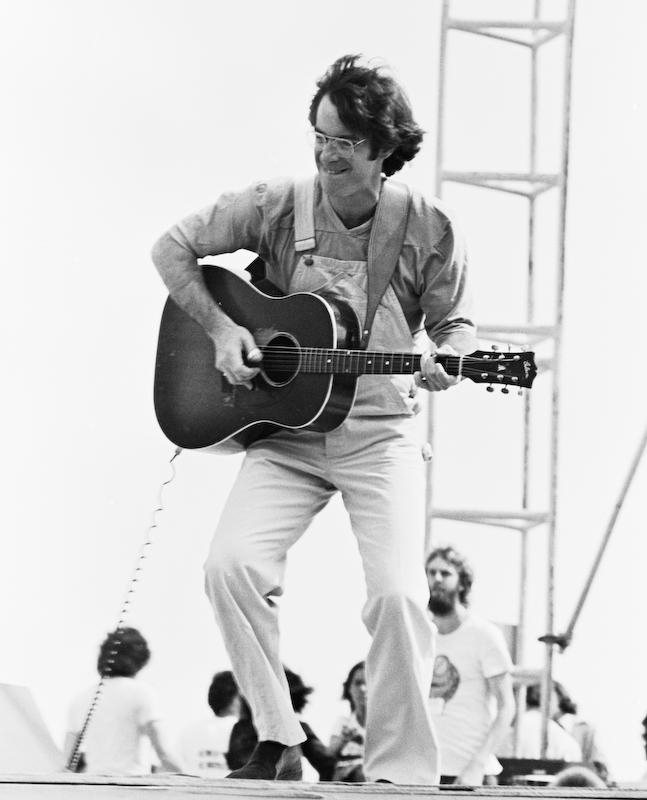
Performing at the Woodstock Reunion 1979 at Parr Meadows in Ridge, New York

Sebastian left the Lovin' Spoonful in 1968 and did not play with any later versions of the band, except for a brief reunion with the other three original members to appear in Paul Simon's 1980 film One-Trick Pony, and again for a single performance at their Rock and Roll Hall of Fame induction ceremony in 2000.

[The Lovin'] Spoonful couldn't compete in 1974 because only two of its members [are] still in music. ... I'm enjoying playing with other musicians and wouldn't trade it for what at best would be propping up [an] old idol for the bucks its memory might evoke.

— John Sebastian, 1974

Sebastian has continued to tour and play live, both solo and with a variety of backing bands. He had a long association with the eclectic rock band NRBQ, dating back to the early 1980s, when he played on NRBQ's album Grooves in Orbit (1983). He has said that NRBQ "to a large extent, picked up where The Lovin' Spoonful left off" because of NRBQ's "wide range of musical styles that they're not only able but accurate at playing," and he expressed appreciation for NRBQ's support during a low point in his career. In turn, Sebastian helped NRBQ by using them on his own Nelvana and Disney Channel soundtrack projects during a period when litigation prevented them from recording. Sebastian has used NRBQ as his own backing band, appeared regularly at their concerts, and recorded frequently with the band members, and NRBQ founding member Terry Adams refers to Sebastian as an "honorary member" of the band. Although he performed Lovin' Spoonful songs solo and with NRBQ (who were themselves promoted in the 1980s as "the new Lovin' Spoonful"), he declined to reunite with several former Spoonful members in 1991.

Throughout the 1990s, Sebastian frequently appeared with the J-Band, a jug band including Fritz Richmond from the Jim Kweskin Jug Band, jug band pioneer Yank Rachell, Jimmy Vivino, and Geoff Muldaur. Sebastian and the J-Band were featured in Chasin' Gus' Ghost (2007), a documentary about the roots and influence of jug band music. The film screened in August 2007 at the San Francisco Jug Band Festival (where Sebastian performed with other musicians featured in the film, including Geoff Muldaur, Maria Muldaur, Jim Kweskin and David Grisman) and made its film festival debut in October 2007 at the Woodstock Film Festival. In the film Sebastian humorously explains (with musical accompaniment) how his song, "Younger Girl", was inspired by Gus Cannon's "Prison Wall Blues."

Sebastian's live performances in the 2000s have included performing as a trio with country blues duo Paul Rishell and Annie Raines in 2002; touring with Maria Muldaur and her Garden of Joy jug band in 2009; and occasional appearances with mandolinist David Grisman, with whom Sebastian played in the Even Dozen Jug Band in the 1960s and more recently collaborated on a CD album release, Satisfied. In 2008 he performed solo, but with Roger McGuinn of the Byrds in Ann Arbor, Michigan. Each would play songs solo, but alternate their sets with each other.

=== Record releases ===
After leaving Reprise, Sebastian continued to occasionally release CD albums through a variety of small labels. Although a number of these releases consisted of compilations or live performances of his older material from the 1960s and 1970s, some, such as Tar Beach (Shanachie, 1993) and Satisfied (with David Grisman) (Acoustic Disc, 2007) have contained significant new recordings. Tar Beach in particular contained eleven previously unreleased songs written or co-written by Sebastian; four songs were composed by the team of Sebastian and songwriter Phil Galdston, with whom Sebastian also collaborated on the score for the Sig Shore-directed feature film The Act (1984). According to Colin Larkin, Sebastian had written many of the songs that appeared on Tar Beach more than a decade prior to the album's release. Two later releases, I Want My Roots (Music Masters, 1996) and Chasin' Gus' Ghost (Hollywood, 2000), focused on Sebastian's work with the J-Band.

=== Soundtrack work ===
Sebastian is a frequent contributor to film and TV soundtracks. In particular, he has written and performed music for a number of children's films and TV productions. He wrote the music and provided the singing voice of "Daniel Mouse" for the Canada-based Nelvana animated television special The Devil and Daniel Mouse (1978) about two mice attempting to succeed in the music business. He supplied music for several more Nelvana productions, including Strawberry Shortcake: Housewarming Surprise (1983), Strawberry Shortcake Meets the Berrykins (1985), The Care Bears Movie (1985), The Care Bears Adventure in Wonderland (1987), and "Care Bear Countdown", the theme song for Nelvana's The Care Bears Family TV series. He also wrote and sang the theme song/narration for Nelvana's TV pilot The Get Along Gang; however, none of it was kept when DIC Entertainment took over the project. He wrote and performed the theme song of the KNBC syndicated children's program That's Cat (1976–1979), and hosted a 1986 Disney Channel family special entitled What a Day for a Daydream.

=== Television presenter ===
Since the 1980s, Sebastian has hosted several television programs about 1960s and 1970s music, including paid programs for compilation sets, a syndicated live music and interview program called Deja View, and a half-hour program called The Golden Age of Rock and Roll, which featured video footage of 1960s bands performing on variety shows. He also hosted a Lovin' Spoonful retrospective broadcast on PBS in March 2007, talking about various Spoonful numbers in between vintage video clips of the band up to the time he left.

=== Children's book author ===
In 1993, Sebastian authored a children's book, JB's Harmonica, illustrated by his godfather Garth Williams, about a young bear whose musical aspirations are overshadowed by the talents of his famous musician father.

=== Instructor at Homespun Tapes ===
Sebastian has released a series of instructional DVDs, CDs, downloads, booklets, and (prior to the use of digital media) analog tapes for learning to play guitar, harmonica, and autoharp, or for learning specific styles or songs. These instructional materials are distributed by Homespun Tapes, a company founded and operated by folk musician Happy Traum. Materials offered with Sebastian as an instructor have included An Easy Guide to Tuning Your Guitar, John Sebastian Teaches Eight Lovin' Spoonful Hits (and "Welcome Back"), John Sebastian Teaches Blues Harmonica, Learn to Play Autoharp, and The Fingerpicking Blues of Mississippi John Hurt: A Spoonful of Classic Songs.

=== Other appearances and activities ===
In November 1992, Sebastian made a cameo appearance on the sitcom Married... with Children (Season 7, Episode 9, "Rock of Ages") as himself, along with other 1960s rock stars Spencer Davis, Richie Havens, Robby Krieger, Mark Lindsay, and Peter Noone.

Sebastian appeared on the Eels' 2005 release, Blinking Lights and Other Revelations.

On January 12, 2014, Sebastian appeared on CBS News Sunday Morning to talk about his career with and without the Lovin' Spoonful, Eric Clapton, and the Martin guitar.

In 2016, Sebastian appeared on Richard Barone's Sorrows & Promises: Greenwich Village in the 1960s album, playing harmonica, autoharp and making a vocal cameo on Barone's cover of the Lovin' Spoonful song "Did You Ever Have to Make Up Your Mind?"

== Influence and legacy ==
Sebastian is a notable songwriter whose work has been covered by many artists, including Elvis Costello ("The Room Nobody Lives In"), Johnny Cash ("Darlin' Companion"), and Del McCoury ("Nashville Cats"). Several songs have also spawned multiple covers, including:

- "Lovin' You" – covered by Dolly Parton, Helen Reddy, and Bobby Darin;
- "Stories We Could Tell" – covered by the Everly Brothers, Tom Petty, and Jimmy Buffett;
- "Darling Be Home Soon" – covered by Joe Cocker, the Association, Slade, Cass Elliot, Bruce Hornsby, Allison Crowe, and others.

Sebastian is also credited with helping to popularize the art of tie-dyeing clothing among music fans and festival goers in the late 1960s, by publicly appearing in outfits that he tie-dyed himself after learning the process from Ann Thomas of Water Baby Dye Works. His tie-dyed yellow patterned denim jacket, which he dyed himself and wore at Woodstock, has been prominently displayed in the Rock and Roll Hall of Fame.

Stories We Could Tell, the title of a novel by British writer Tony Parsons, comes from the Sebastian song of the same name.

== Awards and honors ==
As an original member of the Lovin' Spoonful, Sebastian was inducted into the Rock and Roll Hall of Fame in 2000. He was also inducted into the Songwriters Hall of Fame in 2008.

== Personal life ==
Sebastian has been married three times. His first wife was Jean "Butchie" Webber (later known as Butchie Denver after she married actor Bob Denver). According to Steve Boone, Butchie was an early supporter and friend of the Lovin' Spoonful and secretly married Sebastian in the early 1960s to reduce his chances of being drafted for service in the Vietnam War. The couple divorced in 1966. In May 1966, Sebastian married Loretta "Laurie" Kaye, a waitress at Steve Paul's The Scene who later worked for Hit Parader magazine; they divorced in 1968.

In 1972, Sebastian married Catherine Barnett, a photographer and artist who has designed numerous album covers. The couple have two children, and they have lived together in Woodstock, New York, since 1976.

Since the early 1990s, Sebastian has struggled with throat problems that eventually affected and changed his singing voice, but he has continued to perform and tour.

== Solo discography ==
=== Original studio and live albums ===
Release year	Label/catalog #	Album title	Billboard Album Chart	Format	Notes
1970	Reprise; RS 6379	John B. Sebastian	20	Vinyl (original); Reel (RST-6379-B); CD (reissue)	Early copies of vinyl album contained "tie-dyed" liner notes. Reissued in USA by Collectors' Choice COLC 720 (2006).
1970	MGM; SE-4720	John Sebastian Live	129	Vinyl	Recording of a live outdoor concert in Woodstock, NY in July 1970. Withdrawn from market in 1970, two months after release; at least one bootleg version circulated.
1971	Reprise; MS 2036	Cheapo Cheapo Productions Presents Real Live John Sebastian	75	Vinyl (original); Reel (RST-2036-B); CD (reissue)	Recorded live at four California shows. Reissued in USA by Collectors' Choice COLC 724 (2006).
1971	Reprise; MS 2041	The Four of Us	93	Vinyl (original); Reel (RST-2041-B); CD (reissue)	Reissued in USA by Collectors' Choice COLC 721 (2006).
1974	Reprise; MS 2187	Tarzana Kid	–	Vinyl (original); CD (reissue)	Reissued in USA by Collectors' Choice COLC 722 (2006).
1976	Reprise; MS 2249	Welcome Back	79	Vinyl (original); CD (reissue)	Reissued in USA by Vivid Sound RATCD-4235 (2004), Collectors' Choice COLC 724 (2006), and Rhino Entertainment (2008).
1978	Nelvana; NEL 7802	The Devil and Daniel Mouse: A Nelvana Story Album	–	Vinyl	Contains soundtrack from children's animated TV special, featuring songs written by Sebastian and sung by Sebastian (as "Daniel Mouse") and Laurel Runn (as "Jan Mouse"), with additional narration by Sebastian.
1992	Shanachie; 8006	Tar Beach	–	CD	Studio album consisting of previously unreleased original tracks by Sebastian. Four songs were co-written with Phil Galdston, and the traditional "Mornin' Blues" was arranged by Sebastian.
1996	Music Masters; MMD 65137	John Sebastian and the J-Band: I Want My Roots	–	CD	The J-Band consists of Jimmy Vivino, Fritz Richmond, and James Wormworth, with guests Yank Rachell, Paul Rishell, Annie Raines, Rory Block, John Simon, and Richard Crooks.
1999	Hollywood; HR-62227-2	John Sebastian and the J-Band: Chasin' Gus' Ghost	–	CD	The J-Band consists of Paul Rishell, Annie Raines, Fritz Richmond, and James Wormworth, with guests Jimmy Vivino, Geoff Muldaur, Yank Rachell, John Simon, Jerry Marotta, and Benson Sebastian.
2007	Acoustic Disc; ACD-67	John Sebastian & David Grisman: Satisfied	–	CD	With David Grisman; collection of traditional folk songs and some original songs.
2018	No Songs label	John Sebastian's Short Songs For Shorter People - 1980's Cartoon Tunes	–	CD	Eighteen songs from Sebastian's 1980s career writing songs for cartoons for Canadian Production Company, Nelvanna
2021	Renew Records / BMG	John Sebastian and Arlen Roth Explore the Spoonful Songbook	–	Vinyl, CD, and digital	Thirteen reimagined songs from Sebastian's hit-making band plus "Stories We Could Tell", originally included on 1974's Tarzana Kid; the MonaLisa Twins add guest vocals to four cuts

=== Original U.S. singles ===
Release year	Label/catalog #	Titles (A-side / B-side)	Billboard Top Singles	Cashbox
1968	Kama Sutra KA-254	"She's a Lady/The Room Nobody Lives In"	84	62
1970	Reprise 0902	"Magical Connection/Fa-Fana-Fa"	–	–
1970	Reprise 0918	"What She Thinks About/Red Eye Express"	–	–
1970	MGM 14122	"Rainbows All Over Your Blues/You're a Big Boy Now"	–	–
1971	Reprise 1026	"I Don't Want Nobody Else/Sweet Muse"	–	–
1971	Reprise 1050	"Well, Well, Well/We'll See"	–	–
1972	Reprise 1074	"Give Us a Break/Music for People Who Don't Speak English"	–	–
1976	Reprise 1349	"Welcome Back/Warm Baby"	1	1
1976	Reprise 1355	"Hideaway/One Step Forward, Two Steps Back"	95	–

=== Selected reissues, compilations, and archival live albums ===
Much of Sebastian's material, especially his 1970s Reprise albums and the 1996 King Biscuit Flower Hour live recording, has been reissued and/or repackaged many times; therefore, this table is selective. Sebastian has also released various formats and packages of long-playing instructional materials for Homespun Tapes, which are not included in this table.

Release year	Label/catalog #	Album title	Billboard Album Chart	Format	Notes
1970	MGM; SE-4654	John B. Sebastian	–	Vinyl	Exact same album as Reprise RS 6379, with different cover art. Withdrawn from market in 1970.
1989	Rhino; 70170	The Best of John Sebastian	–	Vinyl, cassette and CD	"Best-of" compilation of selected tracks from Reprise albums John B. Sebastian, The Four of Us, Tarzana Kid, and Welcome Back, plus the non-LP song "Give Us a Break".
1996	King Biscuit Flower Hour; KBFHCD016	John Sebastian Live on the King Biscuit Flower Hour	–	CD (original and reissue); DVD Audio (reissue)	Recording of a live concert in Brookhaven, NY, Sept. 9. 1979. Reissued several times with different running order and/or some tracks omitted as: From the Front Row ... Live! (DVD Audio, Silverline, 2003); John Sebastian Live (CD, EMI-Capitol Special Markets, 2006; not the same as the 1970 MGM vinyl LP of the same name); Nashville Cats (CD, Disky (Netherlands), 2001).
2001	Rhino Handmade; RHM2 7758	Faithful Virtue: The Reprise Recordings	–	CD	Box set containing reissues of all five Reprise albums; bonus tracks consisting of Sebastian's entire 1969 Woodstock set and six tracks recorded live at Winterland in San Francisco on October 4, 1969; 48-page liner notes booklet; and poster. Limited numbered edition of 3000. The box set was reissued in 2014 by Wounded Bird Records without the bonus tracks, booklet and poster.
2001	Hux; HUX024	One Guy, One Guitar	–	CD	Two live sets at Cambridge Folk Festival recorded for BBC Radio 1 on August 2, 1981, and July 29, 1984, featuring Sebastian accompanying himself on acoustic guitar. Includes 12-page booklet.
2007	Raven (Australia); RAEN 249	John Sebastian: Life and Times 1964–1999	–	CD	Compilation mostly containing Lovin' Spoonful material from the band's Kama Sutra releases, but also a few tracks selected from early 1960s Even Dozen Jug Band, Lovin' Spoonful Elektra tracks, Sebastian solo Reprise recordings, and J-Band recordings.
2014	Edsel; EDSG 8039	John B. Sebastian/ The Four of Us/ Tarzana Kid/ Welcome Back	–	CD + DVD	Re-release of the four studio Reprise albums, bundled with DVD of a previously unreleased concert recorded for the BBC on October 16, 1970. Includes 36-page booklet.

=== Contributions to "various artists" albums ===
This table lists songs written or performed by Sebastian that were originally released on — and in many cases, are only available on — compilations or collaborations with various artists, including but not limited to soundtrack albums. Contributions as a guest on albums released under the name of a specific artist or group are not included.

Release year	Label/catalog #	Album title	Format	Contributions (All songs written by Sebastian unless otherwise noted)
1969	Cotillion/Atlantic; SD 3-500	Woodstock: Music from the Original Soundtrack and More (festival film soundtrack)	Vinyl (original); CD (1994 reissue)	Live versions from Woodstock Festival: "I Had a Dream" "Rainbows All Over Your Blues"
1977	Rounder; 3018	Woodstock Mountains: More Music From Mud Acres (collaborative folk project featuring musicians from Woodstock, New York area)	Vinyl	Plays on the following songs: "Bluegrass Boy" (John Herald), "Waiting for a Train" (Jimmie Rodgers), "Morning Blues" (traditional), "Mason Dixon's on the Line" (Pat Alger), "Amazing Grace" (traditional)
1979	Columbia; JC 36292	Skatetown, U.S.A. (soundtrack to film of the same name)	Vinyl	"Roller Girl"
1985	Kid Stuff; DAR-3901 (Vinyl LP); DT 4901 (Cassette)	The Care Bears Movie: Original Soundtrack Album	Vinyl, Cassette	"Nobody Cares Like a Bear" "When You Care, You're Not Afraid to Try" "In a Care Bear Family"
1994	Atlantic; 7567-82618-2 XY	The Best of Woodstock	CD	Live version from Woodstock Festival: "I Had a Dream"
1994	Atlantic; 82636-2	Woodstock: Three Days of Peace and Music	CD (box set)	Live versions from Woodstock Festival: "Rainbows All Over Your Blues" "I Had a Dream"
1999	Shanachie; 6041 (re-released 2002 as St. Clair Entertainment Group 6788)	Song of the Hills: Instrumental Impressions of Appalachian Classics (re-release title: Man of Constant Sorrow: Instrumental Impressions of the American Heartland)	CD	Plays on the following traditional folk songs: "Tom Bigbee Waltz", "When First Unto This Country", "Wagoner's Lad"
2004	Lovenotes —	Tails of the City: Dog Tunes by Murray Weinstock	CD	Performs "Dog Day Afternoon" with Joey Spampinato (song written by Murray Weinstock)
2009	Rhino; 7567-82618-2 XY	Woodstock: 40 Years On: Back to Yasgur's Farm	CD (box set)	Live versions from Woodstock Festival: "How Have You Been" "Rainbows All Over Your Blues" "I Had a Dream"

== Bibliography ==
- Barone, Richard (2022). Music + Revolution: Greenwich Village in the 1960s. Lanham, Maryland: Rowman & Littlefield. ISBN 978-1-4930-6302-4 – via Google Books.
- Unterberger, Richie (2003). Eight Miles High: Folk-Rock's Flight from Haight-Ashbury to Woodstock. San Francisco: Backbeat Books. ISBN 0-87930-743-9.
