= Welcome Back (John Sebastian album) =

Studio album by John Sebastian
- Released: 19 April 1976
- Genres: Pop, rock
- Length: 32:55
- Label: Reprise
- Producers: Steve Barri, John Sebastian

John Sebastian chronology
Tarzana Kid (1974)	Welcome Back (1976)	Tar Beach (1993)

Singles from Welcome Back
- 1. "Welcome Back" Released: March 1976; 2. "Hideaway" Released: 1976

Welcome Back is an album by American singer/songwriter John Sebastian, released in 1976 (see 1976 in music). It reached number 79 on The Billboard 200 chart. Two singles were released from the album with the title song "Welcome Back" reaching number one on the Billboard Hot 100 and Adult Contemporary charts. It also reached number 93 on the Country Singles chart. The second single, "Hideaway" peaked at number 95 on the Billboard Hot 100.

== History ==
Following the commercial failure of his 1974 album Tarzana Kid, Sebastian owed one more record on his contract with Reprise Records. When his theme song for the television series Welcome Back, Kotter became a hit, Reprise wanted an LP to capitalize on the song's success. With his contract fulfilled, Reprise dropped him from the label. It would be seventeen years before Sebastian's next studio album was released.

== Reception ==
Professional ratings
Review scores
Source	Rating
Allmusic	3/5 stars
Encyclopedia of Popular Music	3/5 stars

In his retrospective Allmusic review, critic William Ruhlmann called Welcome Back "…an uneven collection filled out with a near-instrumental ("Let This Be Our Time to Get Along"), a folk-blues song he'd written in the early '60s ("Warm Baby"), and a remake of one of his old Lovin' Spoonful songs ("Didn't Wanna Have to Do It"). The new material tended to be craftsman-like pop songs, the melodies simple and catchy, the lyrics light verse."

== Reissues ==
Welcome Back was reissued on CD in 2004 by Vivid Sound, in 2007 by Collectors' Choice Music and in 2008 by Rhino Entertainment.

== Track listing ==
All songs written by John Sebastian unless otherwise noted.

1. "Hideaway" – 2:55
2. "She's Funny" – 3:34
3. "You Go Your Way and I'll Go Mine" – 2:57
4. "Didn't Wanna Have to Do It" – 3:22
5. "One Step Forward, Two Steps Back" (Sebastian, John Charles Lewis) – 4:36
6. "Welcome Back" – 2:51
7. "I Needed Her Most When I Told Her to Go" – 2:56
8. "A Song a Day in Nashville" – 4:00
9. "Warm Baby" – 2:34
10. "Let This Be Our Time to Get Along" – 3:10

== Personnel ==
- John Sebastian – vocals, electric guitars, acoustic guitars, baritone guitar, harmonica, autoharp, piano phased
- David Hungate – bass guitar
- Richard Bell – acoustic piano, electric piano, clavinet, organ
- Jeff Porcaro – drums

(except on "Welcome Back" which is sung and played by The Stone Warblers)

=== Additional Musicians ===
- Jeff "Skunk" Baxter – pedal steel guitar on "A Song a Day in Nashville"
- Michael Omartian – ARP synthesizer, Marimba
- Reggie Knighton – electric guitar on "I Needed Her Most When I Told Her to Go"
- The Blintzes (Jon Lind, Reggie Knighton) – harmony vocals on ("She's Funny", "You Go Your Way and I'll Go Mine" and "I Needed Her Most When I Told Her to Go" )

=== The Stone Warblers ===
- John Sebastian – lead vocal, electric lead guitar, acoustic guitar, Indian drum, harmonica
- Murray Weinstock – piano
- Ron Koss – electric rhythm guitar
- Ken Altman – bass guitar
- The Stone Warblers (John Sebastian, Murray Weinstock, Ron Koss, Ken Altman) – harmony vocals, handclaps

== Charts ==
Year	Chart	Position
1976	Billboard 200	79
