= B. Mitchel Reed =

American disc jockey (1926–1983)

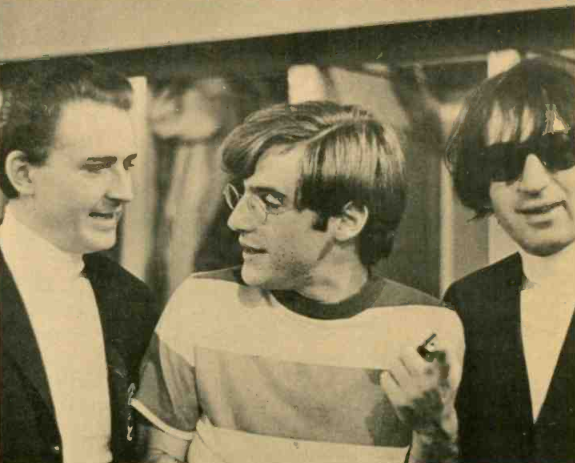
Reed (right) in 1965, with Reb Foster (left) and John Sebastian

B. Mitchel Reed (June 10, 1926 – March 16, 1983) was a successful and popular American disc jockey on both Top 40 and album-oriented rock radio stations, working in New York and Los Angeles during his 25-year career.

The incorrect alternate spelling as B. Mitchell Reed is often used in The Los Angeles Times and elsewhere.

== Career ==
Born Burton Mitchel Goldberg in New York, New York, Reed held a B.S. degree in journalism and an M.A. in political science at the University of Illinois. After serving in the U.S. Air Force, he entered the world of radio while teaching political science at his alma mater.

Reed hosted the all-night Birdland Jazz Show at WOV (AM) in New York in 1956. A year later, he landed a job at AM station KFWB in Los Angeles, playing jazz and calling himself "The Boy on the Couch." On January 2, 1958, KFWB became a pioneering Top 40 station known as "Color Radio/Channel 98," and the DJs were known as "The Seven Swinging Gentlemen." The lineup included Bruce Hayes, Al Jarvis, Joe Yocam, Elliot Field, Bill Ballance, Ted Quillin, and Gene Weed. Reed held the 6-9 P.M. time slot. Under Program Director Chuck Blore, KFWB became the number-one radio station in LA.

He was known as "The Fastest Tongue in the West," for the speed in which he spoke to his audience. He left KFWB for WMCA in his home state of New York on February 7, 1963. He soon became part of a team of disc jockeys known as "The Good Guys," among them Jack Spector, a fellow alum from Boys High School in Brooklyn who had graduated two years ahead of him.

Reed went to London, England in pursuit of a band making headlines in hopes of breaking them in New York. The band was none other than The Beatles. His persistence paid off as it led to advance record pressings and exclusive interviews. This helped usher in "Beatlemania" in early 1964.

By 1965, Reed decided to return to Los Angeles. His last show at WMCA was on March 20 of that year. Thousands of his fans cheered him at the airport upon his departure. Many fans who were thrilled of his return greeted him when he arrived in LA. This ushered in his second stint at KFWB and The Wide Wide Weird World of BMR.

After attending the Monterey Pop Festival in the Summer of Love, June 1967, Reed realized he wanted to go in another direction music-wise. He met with San Francisco-based DJ Tom Donahue over the frustrations of AM radio's music restrictions. Donahue was Program Director for the FM "underground radio" station, KMPX (FM). With no such similar music station in L.A., Reed left KFWB and, with Donahue, founded the new progressive rock (radio format), or "underground radio", at KPPC-FM in Pasadena. In March of 1968, with the release of her debut album, singer-songwriter Joni Mitchell performed on Reed's show. As Barney Hoskyns wrote in Hotel California, "So much did Reed talk her up that her first live dates in town were all sellouts at the Troubadour." Both KMPX and KPPC achieved more success than anticipated due to the popularity of this new AOR (album-oriented rock) programming, which was in defiant opposition to the then current Top 40 AM radio format and its limitations. However, both stations ran into a conflict with their respective owners, thus resulting in a DJ strike, ("strike action"). After the strike ended in June 1968, Donahue persuaded station owner Metromedia to take on the AOR format at KMET (FM)-Los Angeles. In 1968, Reed programmed what would become one of the first 24-hour automated music stations. It would go live in the summer of 1969. He left KMET for one year in 1971 to work at KRLA. He returned to KMET in 1972 where he worked until 1978. Reed then went to work at KLOS from 1979 until 1982. KMET (the "Mighty Met") had a nearly 20-year run as one of L.A.'s top album rock outlets ultimately losing its decades-long ratings war with its cross-town FM rival, KLOS.

In 2014, Reed was inducted into the Rock Radio Hall of Fame in the "Legends of Rock Radio-Programming" category for his work at KPPC and KMET. In 2026, Reed was inducted into the Radio Hall of Fame in the "Legends" category.

== Death ==
In 1978, Reed underwent coronary bypass surgery. He would leave KMET for KLOS (FM) in 1979. His lingering heart condition caught up with him on March 16, 1983. He died in his West Los Angeles home at the age of 56.

== In Popular Culture ==
Reed is featured in Paul Thomas Anderson's Licorice Pizza, played by voice actor Ray Chase.
