= Reb Foster =

American radio DJ and band manager (1936–2019)

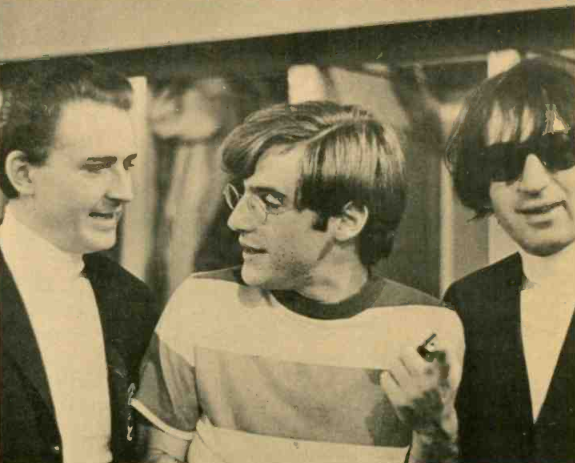
- Foster (left) in 1965, with John Sebastian (center) and B. Mitchel Reed

Background information
- Birth name: James Dennis Bruton
- Occupation(s): Radio personality, band manager, club owner

James Dennis Bruton (March 18, 1936 – August 25, 2019), known as Reb Foster and earlier in his career as Dennis James, was an American radio DJ and band manager.

He was born in Fort Worth, Texas, and after his parents (Harry Bruton, father) split up was raised by his mother (Imotene Hanby) in Amarillo. From the mid-1950s, he worked on radio stations in Dallas, Houston, Cleveland, Denver and Portland, where he was known as Dennis James (eventually forced to change due to the nationally known game show host who also used the pseudonym). After working at KYA in San Francisco, he moved to KRLA in Los Angeles in 1962, and was involved in the Beatles' arrival in the city in August 1964. He had a regular afternoon show, featuring character voices including "Maude Skidmore", and owned the Revelaire Club in Redondo Beach. He worked at KRLA between 1962 and 1969 (with a break between 1965 and 1967, spent at rival KFWB), and again for spells in the 1970s and 1980s. In the 1970s, he also managed bands including the Turtles, Three Dog Night, Everpresent Fullness, and Steppenwolf. Legend has it that the 1964 surf music tune "Mr. Rebel" by Eddie & the Showmen was a tribute to Foster. Foster also acted in episodes of The Adventures of Ozzie and Harriet and The Lucy Show.

He left Los Angeles in 1987 and returned to live in Amarillo. He died on August 25, 2019, aged 83.
