= MonaLisa Twins =

Austrian pop rock band

- Born: Vienna, Austria
- Origin: Austria
- Genres: Rock and roll; pop; folk rock
- Occupation: Singer-songwriters
- Instruments: Guitar; bass; drums; ukulele; cello; harmonica
- Years active: 2007–present
- Members: Mona Wagner; Lisa Wagner
- Website: monalisa-twins.com

MonaLisa Twins are a pop rock band, fronted by twin-sister singer-songwriters Mona Wagner (vocals, rhythm guitar, percussion, harmonica, flute, recorder, accordion) and Lisa Wagner (vocals, lead guitar, ukulele, cello).

== Biography ==
The twins were born in Vienna, Austria on June 16, 1994 and are based in Liverpool, in the United Kingdom. Known for their YouTube covers of songs by the Beatles and other 1960s bands, many of which have been issued on a series of albums, they also release original music, inspired by the 1960s. They have toured with Steve Harley & Cockney Rebel and performed with them at the Glastonbury Festival in 2017, collaborated with American musician John Sebastian, as well as held a two-year residency at the Cavern Club.

Their father, Rudolf Wagner, is the band's producer; he also plays bass, piano, co-writes, and arranges their music, which is recorded in the family's own studio. Rudolf's wife and the twins' stepmother, Michaela Wagner, is the band's manager and assistant. The family lived in a small village in the Groß-Enzersdorf municipality near Vienna until 2014, when they moved to a suburb of Liverpool.

The band typically has a four-person line-up for live concerts, with Mona and Lisa Wagner mostly playing guitars, and some harmonica and ukulele, respectively, on stage, while being backed by different bassists and drummers. In 2012 and 2013, while they were still based in Austria, those musicians were usually Michael Mozeth (bass) and Philipp Wolf (drums). Since 2014, including the two-year residency at the Cavern Club, they have been backed by several local British musicians.

== Musical style and development ==
=== Genres ===
The Twins started interpreting rock and roll hits from the 1960s and 1970s, including some folk songs. Throughout their career, they have created their original songs in the style of rock & roll and rock pop, but also ballads, paired with quality video clips. Both work symbiotically as a team in their audio and video recordings.

=== Influences ===
The MonaLisa Twins have said that the Beatles were a major influence. Their covers repertoire also includes songs by The Lovin' Spoonful, The Beach Boys, Simon & Garfunkel and Peter Gabriel. Their original music draws mainly on 1960s and 1970s rock and pop, with electric guitar featuring prominently in both their covers and original songs.

The Beatles' press officer, Tony Barrow, praised the duo, particularly their vocal harmonies.

== Discography ==
=== Albums ===
- 2007 – MonaLisa & Band, Live in Concert (double CD)
- 2012 – When We're Together (also DVD)
- 2014 – Play Beatles & More
- 2017 – Orange
- 2018 – Play Beatles & More Vol.2
- 2018 – Play Beatles & More Vol.3
- 2019 – Christmas
- 2020 – The Duo Sessions
- 2020 – Live at The Cavern Club (double CD)
- 2022 – Why?
- 2023 – The Duo Sessions II
- 2025 – The Duo Sessions III
- 2026 – Play Beatles & More Vol.4

=== EP ===
- 2008 – California Dreaming
