= John B. Sebastian (album) =

Studio album by John Sebastian
- Released: March 1970
- Recorded: Late 1968
- Genres: Folk, rock
- Length: 31:50
- Label: Reprise
- Producer: Paul A. Rothchild

John Sebastian chronology
John B. Sebastian (1970)	John Sebastian Live (1970)

Alternate cover
- MGM release

John B. Sebastian is the debut album by the American singer-songwriter John Sebastian, previously best known as the co-founder and primary singer-songwriter of the 1960s folk-rock band the Lovin' Spoonful. The album, released in March 1970, includes several songs that would become staples of Sebastian's live performances during the early and mid-1970s. Most notably, the album included "She's a Lady", Sebastian's first solo single (released in December 1968), and an alternate version of "I Had a Dream" which was used to open the soundtrack album of the 1970 documentary film Woodstock. John B. Sebastian also featured support performances by David Crosby, Stephen Stills and Graham Nash several months before that trio agreed to work together as a performing unit.

The album's release was marred by legal controversy, with two record companies, Reprise and MGM, claiming ownership of the recording and simultaneously distributing the album (with different cover artwork as illustrated, but essentially identical content) for several months in 1970. Reprise, with whom Sebastian signed as a solo artist in 1969, ultimately sued MGM, Sebastian's former distributor, for copyright infringement to settle the dispute, with the MGM release of the album subsequently withdrawn from the market. John B. Sebastian would be the artist's most successful solo album, ultimately peaking at No. 20 on the U.S. Billboard pop albums chart.

== History ==
=== 1968: Going solo, recording and first single ===
John Sebastian co-founded the Lovin’ Spoonful in early 1965, following brief (and sometimes simultaneous) tenures with the Even Dozen Jug Band, the Mugwumps, and as a session musician for Elektra Records. He played on the label's 1964 sampler The Blues Project, which also featured Bob Dylan. Signed to the MGM-distributed label Kama Sutra Records, the Lovin' Spoonful enjoyed considerable success during 1965–67, scoring consecutive "top 10" chart hits with its first eight singles. By late 1967, however, the band's popularity had begun to wane, and in early 1968 Sebastian decided to leave the Spoonful to pursue a solo career. He quickly began writing the songs that would comprise John B. Sebastian and making arrangements for recording sessions. Ten new songs were ultimately included in the album, as well as a solo acoustic version of "You're a Big Boy Now," which Sebastian originally wrote and performed with the Lovin' Spoonful in 1966 in support of Francis Ford Coppola's film of the same name, and which also appears in the latter film's soundtrack album (Kama Sutra catalog no. KLP/KLPS 8058).

Sebastian's choice to produce John B. Sebastian was an old friend from his days at Elektra Records, Paul A. Rothchild. Rothchild, previously a longtime Elektra staff producer, had by mid-1968 become well known from his work on the Doors' first three albums, Love's Da Capo, and the Paul Butterfield Blues Band's landmark album East-West. John B. Sebastian would be one of Rothchild's first projects as an independent producer, but as both Rothchild and Sebastian maintained good relationships with Elektra founder Jac Holzman, most of the album's recording sessions would be convened at that label's Los Angeles studios. The album was the first of three Sebastian solo projects Rothchild would produce; Holzman is acknowledged with a "special thanks" credit in John B. Sebastian's liner notes.

In selecting musicians to work with on the album, Sebastian likewise looked to friends from his pre-Lovin' Spoonful days as a New York City session man; he would later be quoted as saying "I wanted this opportunity to play with the same guys I'd been playing with when we were all broke ... Dallas Taylor, Steve Stills, Harvey Brooks, Paul Harris." In particular, Harris' work as a keyboardist and arranger on John B. Sebastian would begin a three-year working relationship between Harris and Sebastian. Other notable musicians of the period, including David Crosby, Graham Nash, Danny Weis and Buzzy Linhart, would also contribute to the sessions.

Recording for John B. Sebastian was completed during the autumn of 1968. By December, Kama Sutra and MGM began planning the album's release, assigning it a catalog number (Kama Sutra no. KLP/KLPS 8069) and commissioning album cover artwork. The album's first single, "She's a Lady" b/w "The Room Nobody Lives In," was also issued in December 1968 (Kama Sutra catalog no. KA-254). The single's release was accompanied by photo advertisements in the music industry trade papers Billboard and Cashbox that called "She's a Lady" the first of "an incredible new series of songs now being written by one of the most creative composers of contemporary rock." The single performed disappointingly despite the advertising campaign, peaking at No. 84 on the Billboard chart.

Sheet music copyright listings for the songs "I Had a Dream" and "Baby, Don't Ya Get Crazy" suggest that those songs may have been considered for release as a second single from the album. However, while additional singles from John B. Sebastian would be issued following the album's eventual release in 1970, these songs were not among them, and no further singles from the album – nor any further John Sebastian material of any kind – would be issued on the Kama Sutra label.

=== 1969: Release delays, label change and Woodstock ===
Two events took place in early 1969 that together would work to delay John B. Sebastian's release: the disbanding of the Lovin' Spoonful, and Kama Sutra Records' terminating its distribution agreement with MGM Records. Neither event was completely unexpected. The Lovin' Spoonful had struggled to maintain a presence on the pop charts after Sebastian left the band, and broke up after their last album Revelation: Revolution '69 (Kama Sutra catalog no. KLP/KLPS 8073), fronted by drummer/vocalist Joe Butler, failed to chart. Kama Sutra's relationship with MGM began deteriorating in mid-1967, when Kama Sutra's owners founded a new label not affiliated with MGM, Buddah Records. The Buddah label developed a strong identity in 1968 through its association with the bubblegum pop music genre, with new artists that might previously have been contracted to Kama Sutra/MGM now being routed to Buddah instead.

Following the above events, MGM Records contacted Sebastian and his manager, Bob Cavallo, to advise them that they now planned to release John B. Sebastian on the MGM label (catalog no. SE-4654). They also made an unexpected request, asking Sebastian to rebrand his album as a Lovin’ Spoonful record. MGM's rationale for the request was twofold: they claimed that the now-defunct Spoonful still owed the label an album under their contract, and thought a new Lovin' Spoonful album featuring Sebastian would be more marketable than a John Sebastian solo album. Having left the Spoonful a year before, Sebastian felt no obligation to cover their contractual commitments, and declined, telling MGM that rebranding his album as a group effort would be "incredibly dishonest" to potential record buyers.

MGM agreed to go forward with releasing John B. Sebastian under Sebastian's name as originally planned, but their behavior disturbed Sebastian and Cavallo, particularly since Sebastian was contracted not to MGM, but to Kama Sutra. As Kama Sutra had suspended operations upon ending their MGM distribution arrangement (temporarily; the label would be re-established as a Buddah Records subsidiary in late 1969), Sebastian and Cavallo began considering options for a new contract with another label. They contacted Mo Ostin, the head of Warner Bros. Records' Reprise Records subsidiary, and quickly reached agreement on a five-album commitment. As part of the deal, Ostin purchased Sebastian's Kama Sutra contract, ultimately receiving (after delays in delivery from MGM) the master tapes to John B. Sebastian in return. Sebastian would later state:

MGM was asking me for more Lovin' Spoonful albums, claiming that I owed them … At that point, Bob Cavallo went to Mo Ostin. They had a very good relationship, and it was Mo's feeling that MGM was asking me for something that wasn't theirs to ask. He said, "Look, I'll buy this contract out." That was really what happened.

As Reprise readied John B. Sebastian for release, Sebastian's solo career received an unanticipated boost through his impromptu appearance at the Woodstock Festival in August 1969. Sebastian would later discuss the circumstances leading to his set at Woodstock in a 1996 interview:

... I went to Woodstock as a member of the audience. I did not show up there with a road manager and a couple of guitars. I showed up with a change of clothes and a toothbrush. It just so happened that because most of my friends were musicians I ended up backstage. [On August 16, the second day of the festival, following a rainstorm] the stage had filled up with water and it was impossible to put electric instruments onstage. At that time [festival master of ceremonies and co-organizer] Chip Monck said to me "Look, we need somebody who can go out there with an acoustic guitar and hold [the audience] while we go out and sweep the water off the stage and let it dry up and you're elected." So, I had to run and borrow a guitar from Timmy Hardin and go on … it was not anything I had planned for. It was just one of those nice accidents and it resulted in my career then taking another step forward. Now, I was the Summer Concert Guy. I played every summer concert there was.

Reprise would subsequently commission new cover art for John B. Sebastian including photographs taken during Sebastian's Woodstock set, and Reprise's sister label Cotillion/Atlantic Records would include two songs from the set also featured in John B. Sebastian, "I Had a Dream" and "Rainbows All Over Your Blues", in their soundtrack album of Michael Wadleigh's documentary film of the festival Woodstock (1970).

=== 1970: Release and "bootlegging" controversy ===
Reprise issued John B. Sebastian in March 1970, over a year after the album was recorded, and about a year after its originally scheduled release on the Kama Sutra label. The album would be Sebastian's most successful release as a solo artist, reaching No. 20 on the Billboard album chart. Despite the album's success, however, Sebastian would for years harbor frustration that the album did not reach the marketplace sooner:

... the important thing was losing that year and a half. Because music, especially our popular music, changes so fast that the shelf life on a style can be six months, and I was very aware of that. It was one of the first [albums] of the sort of singer-songwriter [genre] … but you couldn't realize it by the time the album came out, 'cause so many other guys with the same approach by then had gotten out there.

A further cause of frustration – and potential public confusion – was MGM's releasing its own version of John B. Sebastian shortly after Reprise did (catalog no. SE-4654, the same number issued to the album by MGM in early 1969). MGM's version used the album's originally commissioned cover art, and contained similar liner notes to the Reprise version (with some inaccuracies; in particular, bassist Harvey Brooks's name is consistently misspelled as "Brooke" on the MGM cover). Warner/Reprise would quickly sue MGM for copyright infringement over their issuing a recording they no longer had contractual rights to; MGM claimed in response that the Lovin' Spoonful's owing them an album, plus the marketing support they gave to the Kama Sutra single release of "She's a Lady," gave them the right to release John B. Sebastian despite the artist's no longer being associated with them. The lawsuit was adjudicated in Warner/Reprise's favor in late 1970, but not before MGM released a second, unauthorized album taken from a July 1970 John Sebastian concert performance, John Sebastian Live (MGM catalog no. SE-4720, released September 1970). Both MGM's version of John B. Sebastian and John Sebastian Live were pulled from the marketplace upon settlement of Warner/Reprise's suit; John Sebastian Live has never been reissued, but its release would inspire Sebastian, Paul Rothchild and Paul Harris to record a live album as Sebastian's second Reprise project (Cheapo-Cheapo Productions Presents Real Live John Sebastian, Reprise catalog no. MS 2036, released March 1971).

== Reception and reissues ==
Professional ratings
Review scores
Source	Rating
AllMusic	4/5 stars
Christgau's Record Guide	B
Encyclopedia of Popular Music	4/5 stars
MusicHound Rock	4/5

Writing for AllMusic, critic William Ruhlman would suggest that Sebastian stretched further in the style of his music on John B. Sebastian after leaving the Lovin' Spoonful, noting that "The songs continued Sebastian's trend toward a more personal writing style, many of them containing images of travel that corresponded to his peripatetic lifestyle... the album was an eclectic but low-key introduction to the solo career of a former group member whose band was known for more elaborate productions, and all the more effective for that." Music critic Robert Christgau wrote "Sebastian is as on for this solo debut as he ever was for the Lovin' Spoonful, and when he's on, the hummability quotient of his songs is dizzying – a good half of these imprint themselves upon impact. But just like Spoonful albums used to, this drags in the second half, and I feel vaguely let down."

John B. Sebastian was reissued on CD in 2006 by Collectors' Choice Music.

== Track listing ==
All songs written by John Sebastian, who also provides lead vocals (except on "Fa-Fana-Fa," which is an instrumental) and accompanies himself on guitar, piano and/or harmonium. Musician credits are as per the liner notes to both Reprise's and MGM's releases of the album.

=== Side 1 ===
1. "Red-Eye Express" – 2:57
  - Musicians: Sebastian, Dallas Taylor, Harvey Brooks, Paul Harris, Danny Weis.
2. "She's a Lady" – 1:45
  - Musicians: Sebastian, Stephen Stills, David Crosby, Ray Neopolitan. Strings and wind instruments by Mr. & Mrs. Stanley Beutens and friends.
3. "What She Thinks About" – 3:04
  - Musicians: Sebastian, Graham Nash, Buddy Emmons, Taylor, Harris. Horns by Burt Collins and friends.
4. "Magical Connection" – 2:49
  - Musicians: Sebastian, Buzzy Linhart, Taylor, Neopolitan.
5. "You're a Big Boy Now" – 2:49
  - Musicians: Sebastian.
6. "Rainbows All Over Your Blues" – 2:27
  - Musicians: Sebastian, Emmons, Taylor, Neopolitan.

=== Side 2 ===
1. "How Have You Been" – 4:12
  - Musicians: Sebastian, Taylor, Brooks, Harris.
2. "Baby, Don't Ya Get Crazy" – 3:00
  - Musicians: Sebastian, the Ikettes, Bruce Langhorne, Reinol Andino, Stills, Taylor, Brooks, Harris, Weis.
3. "The Room Nobody Lives In" – 3:13
  - Musicians: Sebastian, Neopolitan.
4. "Fa-Fana-Fa" – 2:48
  - Musicians: Sebastian, Linhart, Taylor, Brooks, Harris, with Jose Cuervo and Yesterday's Horns.
5. "I Had a Dream" – 2:46
  - Musicians: Sebastian, Gayle Levant, Taylor, Harris, Neopolitan. Orchestral arrangement by Paul Harris.

== Personnel ==
- John Sebastian – vocals, guitar, autoharp, harmonica, piano, percussion
- Stephen Stills – guitar, harmony vocals
- David Crosby – guitar, harmony vocals
- Graham Nash – harmony vocals
- Dallas Taylor – drums
- Danny Weis – guitar
- Buddy Emmons – pedal steel guitar, Moog synthesizer
- Paul Harris – organ, keyboards
- Ray Neopolitan – bass
- Reinol Andino – conga
- Harvey Brooks – bass
- Burt Collins – horn
- Jose Cuervo – horn
- The Ikettes – background vocals
- Bruce Langhorne – tambourine
- Gayle Levant – harp
- Buzzy Linhart – vibraphone
- Mr. and Mrs. Stanley Beutens and Friends – flute, lute, viola, recorder

== Production notes ==
- Produced by Paul A. Rothchild
- John Haeny – engineer
- Bruce Botnick – engineer
- Douglas Botnick – engineer
- Edison Youngblood – engineer
- Fritz Richmond – engineer
- Bob Ludwig – mastering
- Henry Diltz – photography
- Catherine Sebastian – artwork
- Doug Bartenfeld – Audio arrangement consultant
- Ed Thrasher – art direction
- Jim Marshall – photography
- Richie Unterberger – reissue liner notes

== Charts ==
Year	Chart	Position
1970	Billboard Pop Albums	20
