= Welcome Back (John Sebastian song) =

- German cover

Single by John Sebastian

from the album Welcome Back
- B-side: "Warm Baby"
- Released: March 1976
- Recorded: 1975
- Genre: Folk rock; blues rock
- Length: 2:51
- Label: Reprise
- Songwriter: John Sebastian
- Producers: Steve Barri, John Sebastian

John Sebastian singles chronology
"She's A Lady" (1969)	"Welcome Back" (1976)	"Hideaway" (1976)

Official audio
- "Welcome Back" on YouTube

"Welcome Back" is the theme song of the 1970s American television sitcom Welcome Back, Kotter. Written and recorded by former Lovin' Spoonful frontman John Sebastian, it reached No. 1 on the Billboard Hot 100 chart for one week in May 1976, after only five weeks on the chart, and also topped the adult contemporary chart (the show itself had become an instant ratings success upon its premiere the previous autumn). It also reached No. 93 on the country chart.

== History ==
TV producer Alan Sacks wanted a Lovin' Spoonful-like theme song for a new ABC sitcom entitled Kotter. He mentioned this to his agent, who happened to also represent John Sebastian. Sebastian was unable to rhyme anything with "Kotter" except "otter," so he chose a different approach. The producers liked the song, and changed the title of the show to reference the song title.

== Chart performance ==
=== Weekly charts ===
Chart (1976)	Peak position
Australia (Kent Music Report)	24
Canadian RPM Top Singles	2
Canadian RPM Adult Contemporary	1
U.S. Billboard Hot 100	1
U.S. Billboard Hot Adult Contemporary Tracks	1
U.S. Billboard Hot Country Singles & Tracks	93
U.S. Cashbox Top 100	1

=== Year-end charts ===
Chart (1976)	Rank
Canada RPM Top Singles	42
U.S. Billboard Hot 100	58
U.S. Billboard Easy Listening	28
U.S. Cash Box	19

== In popular culture ==
The song is featured twice in the Marvel Cinematic Universe (MCU) film Ant-Man and the Wasp: Quantumania (2023). It is first used in an opening montage depicting Scott Lang's (portrayed by Paul Rudd) life following the events of Avengers: Endgame (2019), and it is used again in a similar montage at the end of the film after Lang and his family escape from the Quantum Realm and defeat Kang the Conqueror (portrayed by Jonathan Majors).

== Other versions ==
- Northern California experimental band Mr. Bungle covered the song on January 13, 1992, in back-to-back English and Spanish versions, at The Berkeley Square in Berkeley, California.
- Canadian country music artist Chris Cummings released his version as a single in 2009. It was later included on his 2010 album Give Me Tonight.
- Rapper Lupe Fiasco sampled it for his song "Welcome Back Chilly", rapper Mase for his release "Welcome Back", hip hop group Onyx on their record "Slam Harder", and by rapper AZ for his tune"Once Again".
- Swedish dream pop group jj recorded their rendition in 2009. This version is used in the trailer for the second season of MTV's Scream.
- The song is often used by Atlanta Braves organist Matthew Kaminski for former Braves players when they are at bat for their current team.
- The artist Rumer - for her 2012 album Boys Don't Cry.
- On May 1, 2020, Count Bass D released his take on his Bandcamp site, commenting, "This take is a nod to the light at the end of this Coronavirus tunnel. It's a peaceful piano rendition aimed to help with the stress of these times."
- In season 5 of Scrubs, J.D. leads the group in a rendition of "Welcome Back Coxer" after Dr. Cox takes a hiatus from work.

== See also ==
- List of Hot 100 number-one singles of 1976 (U.S.)
- List of number-one adult contemporary singles of 1976 (U.S.)
