= Society of Mental Awareness =

SOMA, an acronym the Society of Mental Awareness, incorporated as the SOMA Research Association, Ltd, was a London-based research and advocacy organization studying the effects of psychotropic drugs. The organization ran from 1967, ceasing operations in 1970 and eventually closing in 1971. SOMA was known for publishing the full-page advertisement in The Times on the 24th of July, 1967, under the title "The law against marijuana is immoral in principle and unworkable in practice."

The organization was founded by Stephen Abrams, an American scholar of parapsychology and a cannabis rights activist who was an Advanced Student at St Catherine's College, Oxford from 1960 to 1967. Abrams first announced SOMA through the Oxford student newspaper, Cherwell. They date their official foundation date to June 1, 1967.

In a pamphlet published in 1967, SOMA described itself as "an independent foundation supported by distinguished persons in medicine, science, public affairs and the arts, and its objects are to examine without prejudice the scientific, social and moral aspects of psychotropic drug use and methods of altering consciousness in general; to provide factual information on the subject; and to provide services in connexion with social problems arising out of this subject." In that year, their advisory council was made up of Jonathan Aitken, Francis Crick (1962 Nobel Laureate), Ian Dunbar, Francis Huxley, R. D. Laing, M. A. Phillips, and Anthony Storr.

SOMA had five employees, and premises in Fulham and Camden. The organization had active research and medical programs, the latter in collaboration with the doctors at an affiliated NHS surgery in Notting Hill. Ian Dunbar acted as SOMA's Medical Director, Sam Hutt (also known as Country and Western performer, Hank Wangford) was its Medical Correspondent, working alongside Don Aitken, Adam Parker-Rhodes, and Derek Blackburn. Research efforts included compiling a bibliography of cannabis, and the first human experiments with the active principle of cannabis, tetrahydrocannabinol (THC), synthesized in their laboratory.

== The Times advertisement ==
Following the increased public awareness of drug-based offenses after the arrests of Keith Richards and Mick Jagger, on June 1, 1967, John "Hoppy" Hopkins was sentenced to 9 months in prison for cannabis possession. The following day, an emergency meeting was held at the Indica Bookshop at 102 Southampton Row, an offshoot of the Indica Gallery supported by Paul McCartney, during which Abrams suggested bringing the issue into public debate by running the advertisement. Though the Beatles were not present at the Indica meeting, but the bookshop's co-owner, Barry Miles, called McCartney who agreed to finance the ad.

The sixty-five signatories comprised leading names in British society, including Nobel Laureate Francis Crick, novelist Graham Greene, artist David Hockney, Members of Parliament Tom Driberg and Brian Walden, photographer David Bailey, directors Peter Brook and Jonathan Miller, broadcaster David Dimbleby, psychiatrists R. D. Laing, David Cooper, and David Stafford-Clark, the critic Kenneth Tynan, scientist Francis Huxley, activist Tariq Ali, and The Beatles, along with their manager at the time, Brian Epstein.

The layout was designed by Mike McInnerney, who eschewed contemporary psychedelia in favour of a sober appearance more in keeping with The Times' traditional look.

== See also ==
- Counterculture of the 1960s
- Cannabis culture
