= The Rolling Stones' Redlands bust =

Drug bust involving the Rolling Stones

Front cover of the Daily Express (June 30, 1967) describing the incident and trial

In February 1967, two members of the Rolling Stones, the lead singer Mick Jagger and the guitarist Keith Richards, were arrested at Richards' home, Redlands, a country house estate in West Wittering, Sussex for drug possession. The raid had been preceded by a major campaign by the tabloid newspaper the News of the World, which Jagger was suing for libel at the time, and which carried lurid stories regarding Jagger and his girlfriend, Marianne Faithfull. Although convicted—and having spent a night in prison—a publicity campaign by their colleagues in the music industry encouraged popular support and criticism of the decision to prosecute them. Most notably, the traditionally conservative newspaper The Times published an op-ed by William Rees-Mogg asking Who Breaks a Butterfly on a Wheel?, in which he criticised the prosecutions as unfounded and unnecessary.

== Background ==
=== Drugs, the press and the music industry ===
By the late 1960s, drugs were common in the British music industry, and in 1966 the ITV documentary A Boy Called Donovan publicised his use of marijuana to the wider world. Donovan later described how "this was the first time a British television audience had caught a glimpse of the lifestyle of the beatniks and many were shocked". Other outlets did similarly. London Life campaigned against Michael Hollingshead of Harvard University, who researched psychedelic drugs and introduced many well-known individuals, such as Timothy Leary, to LSD. The increased focus of the police on celebrity drug use led, in author Peter Walsh's words, to "an unholy" alliance between the News of the World and Scotland Yard. In 1967 they began a campaign against many bands, including the Who, the Moody Blues and Cream. (Note: Prosecutions—and convictions—for drugs increased between 1965 and 1967, the latter by 50 per cent.) Walsh notes, however, that "for all the column inches devoted to handcuffed rock stars, the amounts seized continued to be trifling". The News of the World was particularly well known for its prurient headlines and exposés, (Note: They had, for example, been recently criticised by Justice Atkinson during the trial of the Moors Murderers, Brady and Hindley, for paying a witness a grand in cash for a story when the paper was aware that he had a vested interested in securing a conviction. Atkinson called this, in his view, "a gross interference with the course of justice". The paper's approach was discussed in parliament and author Adrian Bingham argues that a "single-minded pursuit of a story ... led journalists to disregard ethical considerations".) such as "celebrity scoops and sex scandals", gaining it the nickname of "News of the Screws" on that account. By the late 1960s, argues Bingham, the paper had moved from traditional court reporting towards a more intrusive form of journalism based on the scoop as its centrepiece. Always, says journalist Paul Trynka, "well known for its disapproval and comprehensive coverage of all kinds of sex and sleaze", the paper "fired the opening salvo of the inter-generational war on Sunday 29 January". Under the headline "Pop Stars: The Truth That Will Shock You", they revealed—and sensationalised—details from Pilcher's investigation and arrest of Donovan. Trynka argues that there was an increasing generation gap between musicians and the press, that where traditional performers had once had a symbiotic relationship with the press, by 1967 "The schism between traditional entertainers and the emerging rock aristocracy had become glaringly obvious". (Note: Trynka notes that the News of the World was under pressure for increasingly strong stories after its rival paper, The People, had enjoyed a series of scoops.)

=== The Stones ===
Keith Richards purchased the Redlands estate in 1966 for £20,000 (£325,000 as of 2025) and moved in with Ratbag, his dog. The house was a large thatched cottage, parts of which dated from the 13th century and was rumoured to have once been visited by Anne Boleyn. It had been a Grade II* listed building since 1958.

== Events leading up to the raid ==
In early 1967, Jagger, Richards and Jones began to be hounded by authorities over their recreational drug use, after the News of the World ran a three-part feature entitled "Pop Stars and Drugs: Facts That Will Shock You". The series described alleged LSD parties hosted by the Moody Blues attended by top stars including the Who's Pete Townshend and Cream's Ginger Baker, and alleged admissions of drug use by leading pop musicians. The first article targeted Donovan (who was raided and charged soon after); the second instalment (published on 5 February) targeted the Rolling Stones.

A reporter who contributed to the story spent an evening at the exclusive London club Blaise's, where a member of the Rolling Stones allegedly took several Benzedrine tablets, displayed a piece of hashish and invited his companions back to his flat for a "smoke". The article claimed this was Mick Jagger, but it turned out to be a case of mistaken identity; the reporter had in fact been eavesdropping on Brian Jones. Two days after the article was published Jagger filed a writ for libel against the News of the World. It is likely, suggests Trynka, that by the time the paper published, the event was a month old, having probably taken place in January 1967. (Note: Trynka notes that Jones' girlfriend, Anita Pallenberg, was away at the time filming Mord und Totschlag.) Jones, the paper said, had stated that he no longer did much acid "now the cats have taken it up. It'll just get a dirty name. I remember the first time I took it—it was on tour with Bo Diddley". (Note: This had been on their first tour of Britain in May 1963, organised by Eric Easton, where they backed Diddley and the Everley Brothers. At the time, says Trynka, acid was "virtually unknown" in Britain.) Further, argues Trynka, Jones had been discussing marijuana, but the paper had deliberately misquoted him as acid had been illegal since the Dangerous Drugs Act of 1965 and thus strengthened the newspaper's story as to what rock stars such as the Stones' were assumed to be doing. Trynka suggests that the misidentification of Jagger for Jones may have been accidental, although acknowledges that "insiders like Marianne Faithfull believe that too was cynical and deliberate: as the figurehead of the Stones, Mick's celebrity would help sell more papers". These allegations were particularly important at the time as they could have adversely affected the group's visa status for touring the United States. Jagger also had an alibi, and the paper became concerned that it would face heavy financial damages if the case came to court; Trynka suggests that the paper then set two of its "most aggressive reporters on the case in an attempt to discover culpability on Jagger's part. Members of the group were followed, vans were parked outside their houses at all hours and they believed telephone lines were bugged as they heard clicks and echoes when they made calls. On the evening of Saturday 11 February the paper's news desk received a call: 'it was enormously fortunate', recalled the editor later, 'that it happened to be an informant.'"

== Attendees ==
David Schneiderman, under the alias David Jones, known as the "Acid King" usually carried a briefcase which acted as a mobile drug dispensary. Robert Fraser was an art dealer and nicknamed "Groovy Bob" by Terry Southern on account of the gatherings he organised, which included celebrities such as the Beatles, the Stones, photographer Michael Cooper, designer Christopher Gibbs, Marianne Faithfull, Dennis Hopper, William Burroughs and Kenneth Anger. (Note: Paul McCartney called Fraser "one of the most influential people of the London Sixties scene".) Christopher Gibbs, an antique dealer, was known as the "King of Chelsea" and was a close friend of the band. (Note: Jagger had previously attended one of Gibbs' dinner parties, where he told a fellow attendee "I'm here to learn how to be a gentleman".) Others were photographer, Michael Cooper, who was to design the cover of Their Satanic Majesties Request. The party, says Trynka, was to be a "showdown between the straight world and the alternative world". Brian Jones had planned to attend, but he was still working on the soundtrack for Mord und Totschlag (Degree of Murder). Nicky Kramer, an associate of the band, also attended.

== Redlands party ==
Trynka asserts that one of the intentions of the party was to give Jagger his first acid trip. Schneiderman provided LSD to the house party goers around midday; Jagger was sick at first. They then drove around Sussex, Cooper photographing them as they travelled. In the evening Tony Bramwell—a Beatles' roadie—arrived, and was soon followed by George Harrison and his wife Pattie, although neither stayed long. (Note: Bramwell later explained his presence as being due to his having a girlfriend in Selsey, but apart from that "when I got there, there was just a lot of shit people that I really didn't like. Robert Fraser always got up my nose. So I wasn't there for more than ten minutes before I left".)

== Raid on Redlands ==
Following a tip-off from the News of the World on Sunday 12 February, Detective Sergeant Norman Pilcher led a squad of 18 officers (Note: Stephen Abrams, editor of the International Times, suggested [Scotland Yard] were unwilling to act on the paper's tip, believing that busting Jagger for marijuana possession would only increase its popularity among youth, but they passed the information on to the local force.)—including two female constables in case it became necessary to perform a body search on Faithfull—raided a party at Keith Richards' home, Redlands. No arrests were made at the time, but Jagger, Richards and their friend art dealer Robert Fraser were subsequently charged with drug offences. Andrew Loog Oldham was afraid of being arrested and fled to America. It was believed that Jagger, Richards and Faithfull were coming down from an all-day acid trip. In his autobiography, Richards later described how, "there's a knock on the door, I look out the window, and there's this whole lot of dwarves outside ... I'd never been busted before, and I'm still on acid". The police discovered little sign of illegality: a few roaches, amphetamine pills from Jagger's Italian supplier, and Fraser was found in possession of heroin. It is likely that the pills were Faithfull's but that Jagger claimed them as his own to save her from arrest.

It was also rumoured that the party the police had interrupted was an orgy and that Jagger had been caught eating a Mars bar out of Faithfull's vagina. (Note: Faithfull later said that the fur rug incident had ravaged her personal life: "It destroyed me. To be a male drug addict and to act like that is always enhancing and glamorising. A woman in that situation becomes a slut and a bad mother.") However, it subsequently emerged that the police entered what Faithfull describes as a quiet domestic scene; "How the Mars bar got into the story, I don't know ... It shows you what's in people's minds". The News of the World reported "with particular gusto", says author Fred Goodman, that when the police entered Faithfull had just had a shower and had had to put a fur rug over herself. She later described how, as a side effect of their comedowns, they kept breaking into laughter while the police searched the house, "collecting sticks of incense and miniature bars of hotel soap". The police told Richards that, under the DDA, he was held responsible as the property owner for any drugs discovered, to which Richards said, "I see. They pin it all on me". Meanwhile, Jones had phoned to say he had finished his work on ''Mord'' and was about to drive down; "don't bother", replied Richards, telling him "we've been busted".

=== Paranoia ===
Uncertainty as to the identity of whoever had informed on them—yet certain that someone had—increased Jagger and Richards' paranoia about those surrounding them. The latter suspected his chauffeur, Patrick; Nicky Kramer was beaten up in an effort to make him speak, to no avail. Gibbs calls this "very unpleasant, awful. I'm sure [Kramer] had nothing to do with spilling any beans." By now Schneiderman—the "most likely suspect", argues Trynka—had "disappeared" to California. On the other hand, notes Trynka, some more recent commentators have argued for the informant being Keylock, as he had a brother in the Metropolitan Police. In any case, he says, the fact that the News of the World somehow knew that Harrison had been at the party earlier in the day indicated to the Stones that it was them that the police wanted to catch, not the member of the more family-friendly Beatles.

== Days following the raid ==
=== Internal band problems ===
Goodman describes the situation as "an obvious call to arms" for their manager, Andrew Loog Oldham, noting that "It was his job to devise a strategy, hire the proper legal and public relations firms, and defuse the situation". In the event, Oldham travelled to the United States to avoid possible arrest himself. He believed, suggests Trynka, that having arrested the bandmembers, police would start coming after their management. His business partner Tony Calder later commented, "I never saw a man pack his bags so quickly. He was terrified." As a result, Oldham was mostly out of the country over the next three months: the Stones, says Trynka, "saw this as cowardice". Instead, Allen Klein attended to the publicity surrounding the arrests, coordinating the group's defence, while the band went to Morocco to escape the press. Oldham later explained that "I was already not dealing with a completely full deck, but if you have five policemen in your house, you've got a good reason to think you're going to end up in jail. So I left the country".

The raid also worsened Jagger and Jones' relationship, with the former increasingly blaming the latter for its occurrence. If Jones had not been overheard in Blaise's bragging about his drug usage, Jagger reasoned, the News of the World—and hence the police—would have had nothing to go on. Jagger ignored the fact that it had been Richards who had organised the party originally and who, argues Trynka had chosen to invite unknown outsiders such as Schneiderman into their close-knit group. Gibbs agrees, stating that, in his view, the bust had been "to a degree brought upon themselves by themselves. Obnoxious behaviour at one time or another. It was all in the stars. So there's no point looking for villains".

=== Coverage ===
The headline of the Evening Standard was "Naked Girl at Stone's party". In the immediate aftermath of the raid, the News of the World did not name the celebrities involved, but on 18 March—a couple of days after the group returned from Morocco—the Daily Mirror named Jagger and Richards ahead of their court appearances.

=== Morocco ===
To escape the press, the group decided to take a holiday in Morocco. The trip started in Paris, badly, when they were nearly arrested for attempting to leave their hotel without paying. Driving Richards' blue Bentley was his associate-cum-bodyguard and ex-paratrooper Tom Keylock. On the journey down through France, Jones, who had been chainsmoking, developed a persistent coughing fit that was not only discomforting but also triggered his hypochondria. The atmosphere, says Trynka, "was heavy, loaded with more than just the smoke from the cigs and the spliffs." Trouble followed them to Spain, where a Málaga restaurant refused to accept their Diners Club card leading to Guardia Civil involvement. In Tangier, Jones and Anita Pallenberg broke up, with Pallenberg beginning—or possibly having already begun—a relationship with Richards. As a result, Jagger, Richards and the rest abandoned Jones in the hotel, penniless.

== Charges and sentencing ==
Although Jagger, Richards and Fraser were released the following day, it soon became clear, argues Goodman, that "the government was serious" about sending them to prison. Originally charged at Chichester Magistrates Court on 10 May, Jagger and Richards pled not guilty and availed themselves of their right to a trial by jury. The case was heard at Chichester Crown Court before Judge Leslie Kenneth Allen Block, where they were found guilty. They were remanded to Lewes Prison to await sentencing on 27 July. The subsequent arrest of Richards and Jagger put them on trial before the British courts, whilst also trying them in the court of public opinion. On 29 June 1967, Jagger was sentenced a £200 fine and to three months' imprisonment for possession of four amphetamine tablets. Richards was found guilty of allowing cannabis to be smoked on his property and sentenced to one year in prison and a £500 fine. Both Jagger and Richards were imprisoned at that point: Jagger was taken to Brixton Prison in south London, and Richards to Wormwood Scrubs Prison in west London. Fraser received a year and did not appeal. Both were released on bail the next day pending appeal. They were represented in court by the barrister Michael Havers.

== Trial ==
The first trial – the only one involving a prison sentence – resulted from a February 1967 police raid on Redlands, Richards's Sussex estate, where he and some friends, including Jagger, were spending the weekend. Faithfull recalls the rug she had worn at Redlands being exhibited as evidence. She also thought that "one of the few pleasant things about the whole scaly business was that we got to see Mick and Keith wearing such beautiful clothes": the former wore a green velvet suit with a pink shirt while the latter wore black and grey silk and a white cravat. Faithfull believes that this choice—encouraging an impression of being romantic figures rather than depraved—aided their publicity campaign.

=== Campaign ===
The case was a cause célèbre. Goodman argues that "their eventual saviour" was one of the most surprising elements of the entire episode. On 1 July the traditionally conservative editor of The Times, William Rees-Mogg—inspired by Alexander Pope—wrote an article critical of the sentences, which questioned whether "Mr Jagger received a more severe sentence than would have been thought proper for any purely anonymous young man". In her autobiography, Faithfull says that up until this point, they felt that "a mysterious and menacing enemy pursued us at every turn"; there was a degree of paranoia on account of Jones' bust the day of their release. It was only with the publication of Rees-Mogg's editorial that they began to feel positive about the outcome. The following month the Times carried a full-page advertisement stating that "The law against marijuana is immoral in principle and unworkable in practice", which, comments Barnes, "further outraged the establishment", to the extent that it was discussed in the House of Commons. The advert was signed by, among others, Graham Greene, David Bailey, Jonathan Miller and the Beatles.

On appeal, Richards' sentence was overturned and Jagger's was amended to a conditional discharge (although he ended up spending one night inside London's Brixton Prison). Rees-Mogg "decr[ied] the thinness of the case and the injustice and idiocy of the sentences" and portrayed Jagger's sentence as persecution. Public sentiment against the convictions increased. A month later the appeals court overturned Richards's conviction for lack of evidence, and gave Jagger a conditional discharge. The Who rush-released two Stones' songs—"The Last Time" and "Under My Thumb"—which was intended to be part of a sequence of releasing their material "to keep their work before the public until they are again free to record themselves".

=== Release ===
Richards spent a night in jail and said that other inmates treated him respectfully. As a result, though, suggests Goodman, he "soon turned wryly philosophic. 'The judge managed to turn me into some folk hero overnight', he said. 'I've been playing up to it ever since.'" The day he and Jagger were released, Pilcher arrested Jones and his girlfriend for possession. (Note: Pilcher was notorious for pursuing celebrities on drugs charges, who in turn accused him of framing them or only carrying out raids and arrests to satisfy the tabloid newspapers. He resigned from the force in 1972 having been was charged with conspiracy to pervert the course of justice after it was alleged he had committed perjury.) Klein despatched his colleague, publicist Les Perrin, to bail them out; they all joined Klein for a party at the London Hilton suite to celebrate. Klein became angry, however, when Marianne Faithfull produced some covertly-stored hash: incensed at the trouble he had gone to gain their release, he threw the container out of his window and flushed the drugs down the toilet. Comments Goodman, "'you people are stupid!' he snapped. Marianne just pouted. 'You didn't have to throw it away.'"

== "We Love You" ==
Six months after the arrest of Jagger and Richards, the Stones released the single "We Love You", intended as a message of appreciation to their fans and other musicians for supporting them throughout the controversy. The single featured fellow musicians John Lennon and Paul McCartney on backing vocals and received positive reviews from music critics. It reached No. 8 on the UK charts and No. 50 on the Billboard Hot 100.

A promotional film for the single, directed by Peter Whitehead, depicted a reenactment of the 1895 trial of Oscar Wilde, with Jagger, Richards and Marianne Faithfull portraying Wilde, Marquess of Queensberry, and Lord Alfred Douglas, respectively. It has been suggested that this was a satirical reference to their recent trial.

== Aftermath ==
In December 1967, the band released Their Satanic Majesties Request, which reached number 3 in the UK and number 2 in the US. It drew unfavourable reviews and was widely regarded as a poor imitation of the Beatles' Sgt. Pepper's Lonely Hearts Club Band. Satanic Majesties was recorded while Jagger, Richards, and Jones were awaiting their court cases. The band parted ways with Oldham during the sessions. The split was publicly amicable, but in 2003 Jagger said: "The reason Andrew left was because he thought that we weren't concentrating and that we were being childish. It was not a great moment really—and I would have thought it wasn't a great moment for Andrew either. There were a lot of distractions and you always need someone to focus you at that point, that was Andrew's job." Satanic Majesties became the first album the Rolling Stones produced on their own. Its psychedelic sound was complemented by the cover art, which featured a 3D photo by Michael Cooper, who had also photographed the cover of Sgt. Pepper.

Richards said in 2003, "When we got busted at Redlands, it suddenly made us realize that this was a whole different ball game and that was when the fun stopped. Up until then, it had been as though London existed in a beautiful space where you could do anything you wanted". On the treatment of Richards' chauffeur and the alleged informant, he later added: "As I heard it, he never walked the same again".

The Rolling Stones continued to face legal battles for the next decade. Richards believed that he and Jagger had been "stitched up" by the News of the World and the establishment together, as the former's best defence in the lawsuit from Jagger was that they were all on drugs, which their conviction would imply. Rees-Mogg later commented on the case:

Nobody else would have been sent to prison for what was essentially a sea-sickness tablet. If I had landed at Dover with those pills in my pocket, or even if it was the Archbishop of Canterbury, we would have been given no more than a fine.

Faithfull believes that the trip they took at Redlands strengthened the bond between Jagger and Richards and laid the ground for their subsequent inseparableness. She also considers that it helped mould their image to their advantage.

== Cultural impact ==
Anthony Barnes, writing in the Independent, suggests that "to some it is a defining moment in history, the point at which a moribund establishment started to disintegrate. To others, the Rolling Stones drugs trial was another nail in the coffin of old-fashioned British values." Either way, he says, very publicly "the establishment turn[ed] on itself". It was the first "pop stars and drugs story" of the tabloid press. This image was enhanced by the role of Havers, who has been described as being, at the time, "the most expensive silk in the country and the pinnacle of the establishment". (Note: Havers went on to become Attorney General—a post he occupied longer than any individual since the 18th century—and was elevated to the House of Lords.) Trynka describes the case as "the defining moment of the decade".

In 2004, the BBC reported that HBO had commissioned a 2-hour-long film—provisionally titled Who Breaks a Butterfly on a Wheel?—of the bust and the events that followed. Nigel Havers was lined up to play his father in a script written by Nick Fisher. Ten years later, Newshub reported that the film was "in the works", and that Nigel Havers—who as a child was sworn to secrecy about the case—had a script ready.

== See also ==
- The Lovin' Spoonful's drug bust (1966)
- Trial of Jimi Hendrix (1969)
- Waylon Jennings' 1977 arrest (1977)
