= Redlands, West Wittering =

Farmhouse in West Wittering, Chichester, West Sussex, UK

Redlands
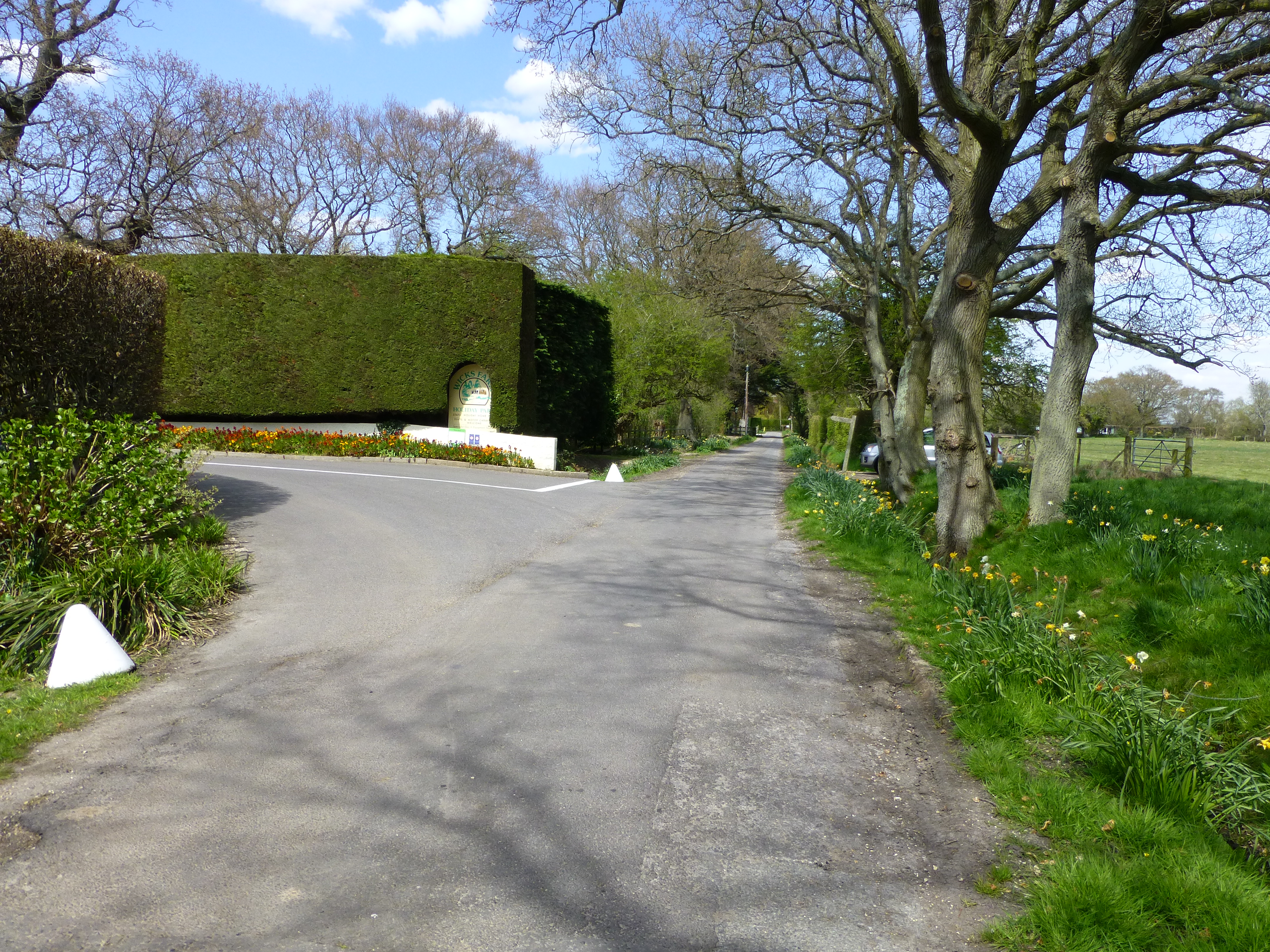
- Redlands Lane, where the Redlands country house is located
- Interactive map of the Redlands area

General information
- Status: Private home
- Type: Country house
- Architectural style: Timber-frame
- Classification: Grade II listed
- Location: Redlands Lane, West Wittering, West Sussex, United Kingdom
- Coordinates: 50.79090°N 0.87013°W
- Year built: 16th century
- Owner: Keith Richards

Technical details
- Material: Brick, flint, thatch
- Floor count: 2

Design and construction
- Known for: The Rolling Stones' Redlands bust

Redlands is a Grade II listed country house estate in West Wittering, West Sussex, England, owned by Rolling Stones guitarist Keith Richards.

In his autobiography, Richards describes purchasing the property in 1966:

We just spoke to each other the minute we saw each other. A thatched house, quite small, surrounded by a moat. I drove up there by mistake...I took a wrong turn and turned into Redlands. This guy walked out, very nice guy, and said, yeah? And I said, oh sorry, we've come to the wrong turning. He said, yes, you want to go Fishbourne way, and he said, are you looking for a house to buy? He was very pukka, an ex-commodore of the Royal Navy. And I said yes.

Redlands was the scene of the notorious February 1967 police raid, the subsequent arrest of Richards and Mick Jagger and prison sentences for Richards, Jagger and art dealer Robert Fraser for drug possession. The house is described in Pevsner as "large, moated, with timber-framed 16th-century centre, and brick and flint wings, all under a thatched roof".
