= Lionel Fraser =

William Lionel Fraser CMG (15 June 1895 – 2 January 1965) was a British banker and self-made millionaire.

== Early life ==
Lionel Fraser was born in London, the second of four children of Scotsman Harry Fraser and Alice Barnard. Harry Fraser was butler to Harry Gordon Selfridge, the founder of the Selfridges department store chain.

Lionel Fraser attended St Mary Abbots higher grade church school in Kensington, London, but he also attended other schools from time to time, as his parents moved around the UK for work. Aged thirteen, Fraser received a scholarship to attend Pitman's School, which was where he received intensive training in French, German, Spanish, as well as in shorthand, typing, and accounts.

== Career ==
In June 1911 at the age of sixteen, Fraser joined Bonn & Co, a small bank specializing in foreign exchange transactions. There he was responsible for correspondence and bookkeeping. Fraser's business career was interrupted when his territorial regiment mobilized on the outbreak of war in 1914. Although commissioned as an officer in 1915, Fraser had to leave his regiment due to an injury suffered in a football match. During the remainder of the war Fraser worked in naval intelligence.

By the time World War II started, Fraser had worked his way up to numerous business leadership roles on a national scale. During the war, he traded foreign currency while serving as an advisor to the UK Treasury. He became a director of Thomas Tilling, Tube Investments and Babcock, and chairman of the merchant bank Herbert Wagg. Other titles included Chelsea Borough Councillor, Trustee of the Tate Gallery, Liveryman of the Fishmongers' Company, and member of White's.

In 1963, he published his memoirs, All to the Good.

== Personal life ==
In 1931, he married Cynthia Elizabeth Walter. They had two sons and a daughter. Both sons went to Eton: the elder Nicholas Fraser, who went on to a very successful career in the City, and the younger, Robert Fraser. As an adult, Robert became known as "Groovy Bob" because he was so well-connected to the leading figures in Swinging London in the 1960s. Their only daughter, Janet, along with her fiancé, Richard Proby (youngest son of Sir Richard Proby, 1st Baronet), was killed in a car accident on 14 March 1958.

Fraser was a devout Christian Scientist. He died on 2 January 1965 of bronchial pneumonia and cancer at his home, 30 Charles Street, London. His memorial service was held on 19 January 1965 at the Church of St Botolph-without-Bishopsgate in the City of London.
