= Clive Barker (artist, born 1940) =

British sculptor and printmaker (born 1940)

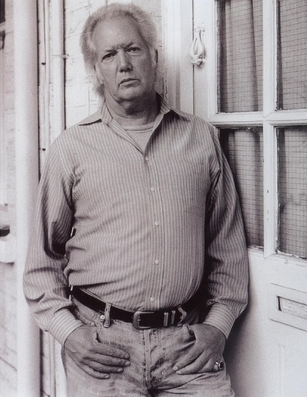
- Born: 1940 (age 85–86); Luton, Bedfordshire, England
- Known for: Sculpture
- Notable work: Splash, 1967; Rio - Homage to Marlon Brando, 1968; Homage to Soutine, 1969; Skull, Gas Mask, 1973; German Head ’42, 1974; Sir Peter Thomas Blake, 1983 Fridge, 1999
- Movement: Pop art, Surrealism

Clive Barker (born 1940) is a British pop artist. His work is present in private and museum collections including the Tate in London, the British Museum in London, the National Portrait Gallery in London, the Victoria and Albert museum in London, the Wolverhampton Art Gallery in Wolverhampton, the Museum für Moderne Kunst in Frankfurt, Städtische Kunsthalle Mannheim, the National Gallery of South Australia in Adelaide, the Berardo Collection Museum in Lisbon, the Philadelphia Museum of Art and the Hirshhorn Museum and Sculpture Garden in Washington, D.C.

== Career ==
Barker was a student at Luton College of Technology and Art from 1957 until he left the course in 1959 and went to work on the assembly line at the Vauxhall Motors car factory in Luton for 18 months. While at Vauxhall, Barker realised the potential of sculptural qualities of industrially-finished objects, particularly in leather and chrome-plated metal. The influence of chrome was a lasting one, leading Barker not only to apply chrome finishes but also to work primarily in polished cast metals for the rest of his life. For nearly five decades, Clive Barker has surprised the art lover with his Pop Art sculptures which bear testimony to his individual story. Barker’s works witness his typical love of disguising reality and play on contrasts, thus introducing an element of ambiguity, a quintessential practice of the Surrealists. By casting a found object, Barker turns the ephemeral into eternity and as such positions himself as an heir to Marcel Duchamp and an inspiration to Jeff Koons' 1980's chromed objects. On occasion Barker has employed the core ideas of Conceptual Art.

His first one-man shows were held at the Robert Fraser Gallery in 1968 and at the Hanover Gallery in 1969. Through the 1970s, Barker's work was exhibited at high-profile galleries in London including Anthony d'Offay and in mainland Europe at Bruno Bischofberger and the Baukunst Galerie. During the past twenty years, Barker had numerous one-man shows at Whitford Fine Art, London. A retrospective exhibition was hosted by Sheffield City Art Galleries and toured the art galleries of Stoke, Eastbourne and Cheltenham in 1981-1982. In 1983 the Imperial War Museum showed the series of 'War Heads', which they had acquired during the 1980s. In 1987, Barker's portraits were shown at the National Portrait Gallery, London.

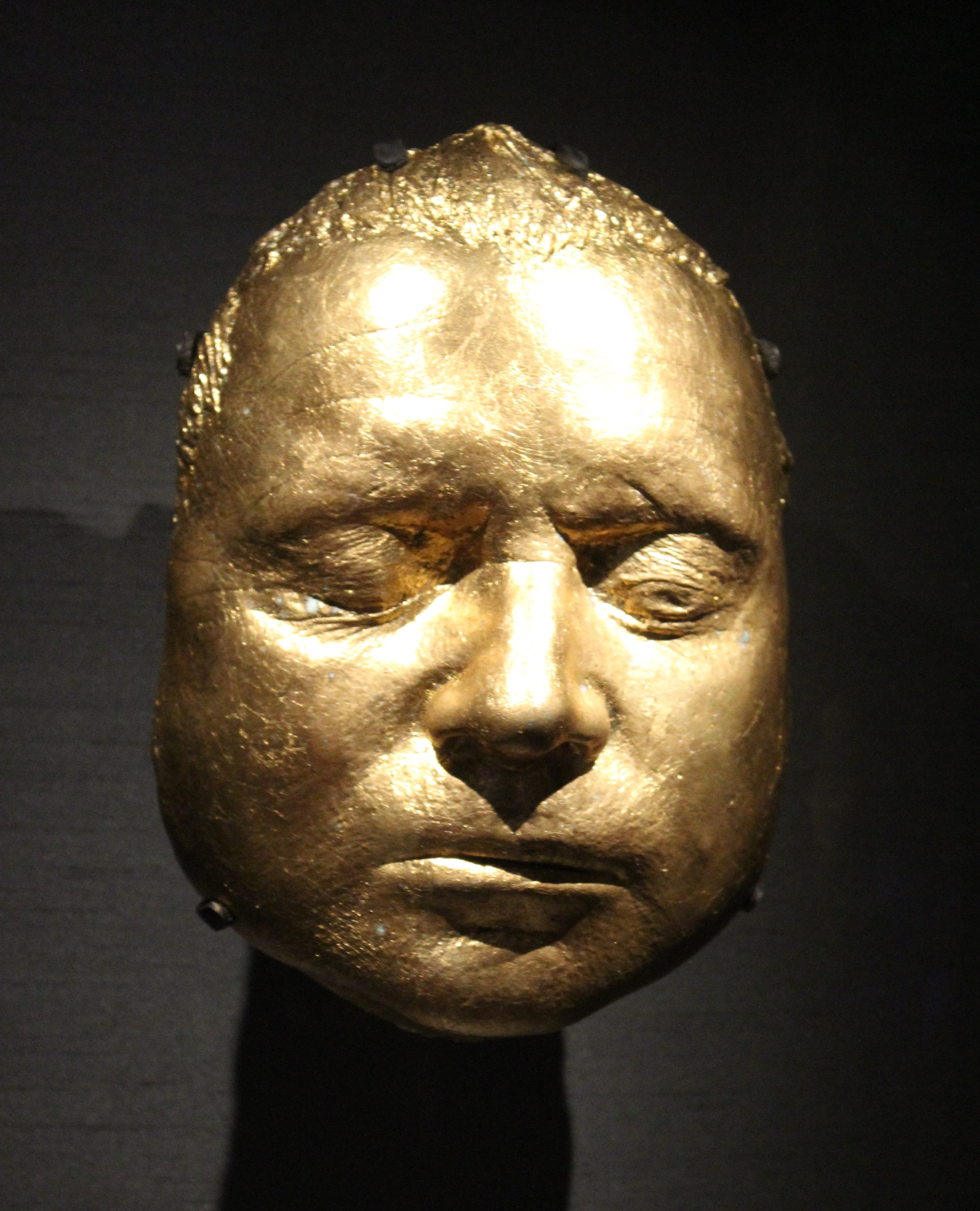
Francis Bacon, a gilt bronze mask by Barker, 1969, National Portrait Gallery, London

Over the years, Barker was included in numerous surveys and international exhibitions of Pop Art, including ‘Pop Art U.S.A – U.K.: American and British Artists of the ‘60s in the ‘80s’, Tokyo (1987); 'Pop Art', Royal Academy of Arts, London (1991); 'Pop Art', Norwich Castle Museum (1997); ‘Les Sixties: Great Britain and France 1962-1973, The Utopian Years’, Brighton Museum and Art Gallery (1997); ‘The Pop ‘60s: Transatlantic Crossing’, Centro Cultural de Belem, Lisbon (1997); 'Pop Art: U.S./U.K. Connections 1956-1966', The Menil Collection, Houston, Texas (2001); 'Pop Art UK, British Pop Art 1956 – 1972', Galleria Civica, Modena (2004); ‘British Pop’, Museo de Bellas Artes, Bilbao (2005-2006); 'Supermarket Pop: Art and Consumerism', Wolverhampton Art Gallery, Wolverhampton (2008); 'Snap, Crackle and Pop', The Lightbox Gallery, Woking (2011); 'International Pop', Walker Art Center, Minneapolis (2015), Dallas Museum of Art (2015-2016) and Philadelphia Museum of Art (2016). In 2017 Wolverhampton Art Gallery hosted a long overdue museum exhibition of Barker's first two decades as a sculptor.

In 2002 a catalogue raisonne of the work dating 1958-2000 was published by Skira.

== Personal life ==
Barker lives in Hampstead. He has two sons, Tad and Ras, from his marriage to artist Rose Bruen.
