= Shepard Sherbell =

American photographer and journalist

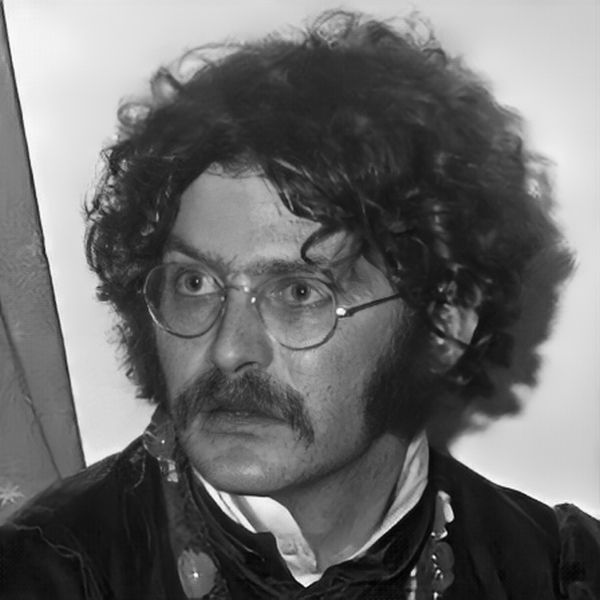
- Sherbell in 1967
- Born: September 12, 1944; Brooklyn, New York City, U.S.
- Died: August 3, 2018 (aged 73)
- Occupations: Photographer; journalist
- Spouse: Diane Wakoski (m. 1965; div. 1967)

Shepard Sherbell (September 12, 1944 – August 3, 2018) was an American photographer and journalist.

== Biography ==
Sherbell was born in Brooklyn. In 1966, while he was a student at Columbia University, he published a poetry magazine, East Side Review. Contributors included LeRoi Jones, Allen Ginsberg, and Norman Mailer. The issue appeared in February 1966. Due to a lack of funding, Sherbell was unable to publish any further issues of the magazine.

In the late 1960s, Sherbell moved to London. He portrayed music groups, including the Beatles, the Rolling Stones, The Who, Badfinger, Deep Purple, Humble Pie and Grand Funk Railroad. He also made individual portraits of musicians, including Jimi Hendrix, Cat Stevens, Rolling Stones guitarist Brian Jones, The Who drummer Keith Moon and The Four Seasons singer Frankie Valli. He also designed numerous record covers and portrayed well-known artists such as Salvador Dalí.

On September 1, 1967, Sherbell traveled to the Netherlands with Brian Jones and photographer Michael Cooper to attend a performance by Maharishi Mahesh Yogi at the Concertgebouw in Amsterdam. Sherbell, Jones and Cooper then followed the Maharishi to Germany, where the Maharishi visited the Academy for Personal Development he had founded in Bremen and held meditation exercises.

In the early 1970s, Sherbell spent some time in California and was involved in the music scene there. In the mid-1970s, Sherbell moved to Washington and worked as a photojournalist. He was the lead photographer for several issues of The Almanac of American Politics magazine and for Democratic and Republican party conventions. Sherbell traveled extensively and reported on various countries, including Grenada, Haiti, Ukraine, Lithuania, Moldova, Libya, Uzbekistan, Afghanistan, and Iran.

From 1991 to 1993, Sherbell lived in Russia and wrote a coffee table book titled Soviets: Pictures from the End of the USSR, which was published by Yale University Press in 2001. At the time of the terrorist attacks on September 11, 2001, Sherbell was living in Manhattan near the World Trade Center. The photographs he took that day were published worldwide.

== Personal life ==
From 1965 to 1967, Sherbell was married to writer Diane Wakoski.

Sherbell died of acute heart failure in 2018 at the age of 73. He had two sisters, was married and divorced twice, and had no children.
