= The Lovin' Spoonful's drug bust =

1966 drug arrest

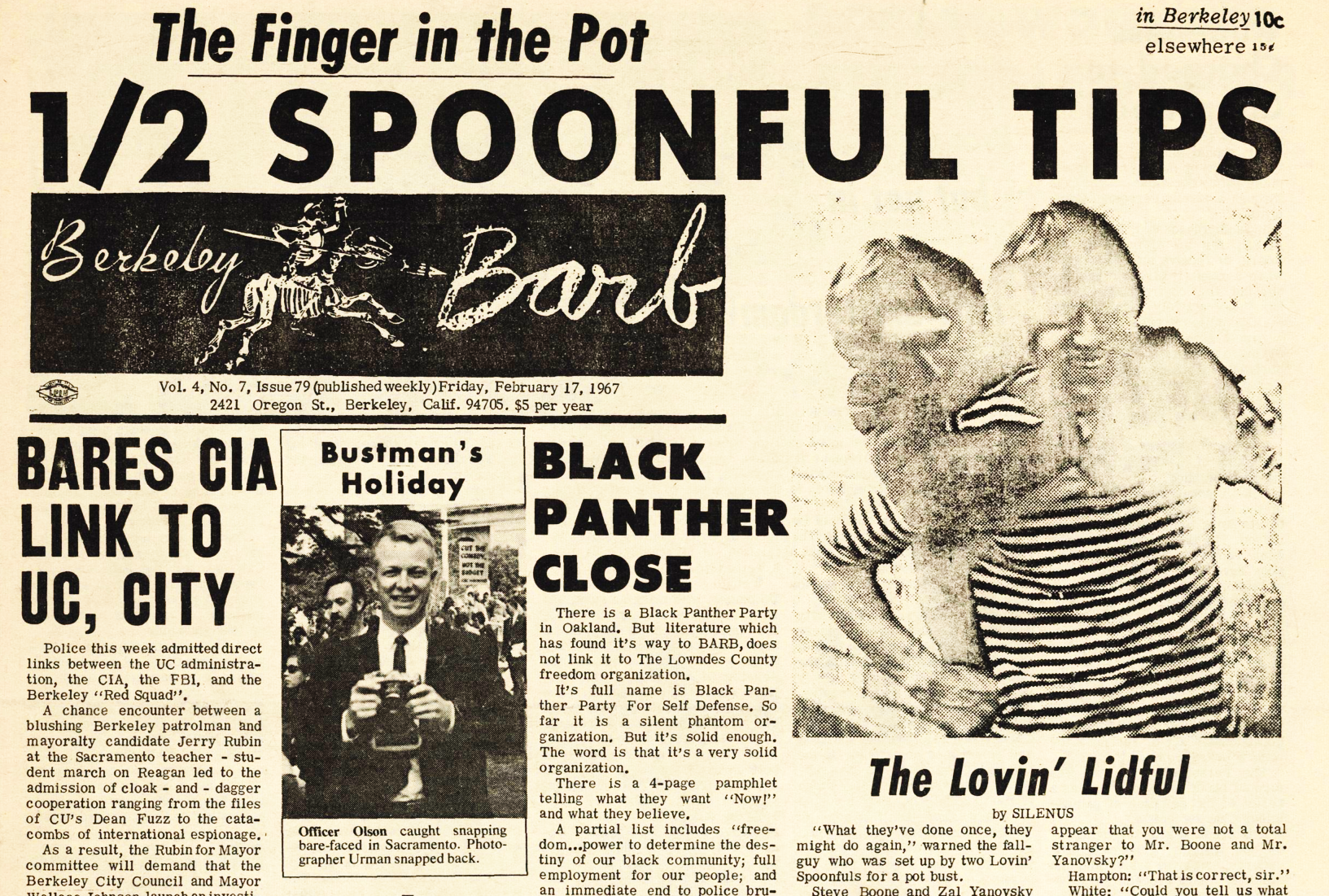
The front page of an underground newspaper, implicating Zal Yanovsky and Steve Boone as informants (Berkeley Barb, February 17, 1967)

In May 1966, Zal Yanovsky and Steve Boone of the Canadian-American folk-rock band the Lovin' Spoonful were arrested in San Francisco, California, for possessing one ounce (28 g) of marijuana. The arrest marked the first time 1960s pop musicians were busted for possessing illegal drugs.

In 1966, the Spoonful were at the height of their success, and Yanovsky, a Canadian, worried that a drug conviction would lead to his deportation and a breakup of the band. To avoid this eventuality, he and Boone cooperated with law enforcement, revealing their source to an undercover agent at a party a week later. Their drug source, Bill Loughborough, was arrested in September 1966. He initiated a campaign to boycott the band, the effectiveness of which is disputed by later commentators. In January 1968, Loughborough was sentenced to three months in county jail followed by three years of probation.

By early 1967, Yanovsky and Boone's cooperation was reported by the West Coast's burgeoning underground rock press, souring the Spoonful's reputation within the counterculture and generating tensions within the band. Amid creative disagreements, Yanovsky's bandmates fired him in May 1967. The band subsequently saw diminished commercial success, and they disbanded in June 1968.

== Background ==
=== California and marijuana ===
In 1913, California became the first US state to prohibit marijuana. Hemp, a type of the drug, had been used in the previous century for medicinal purposes, but marijuana's image in early 20th-century America became increasingly linked with crime and a negative view of Mexican immigrants.

In the 1950s, as recreational use of marijuana became more common, California's state government raised the minimum prison term for possessing it to a minimum of 1–10 years. The new laws punished selling the drug more harshly with a minimum prison term of 5–15 years, including a mandatory three years before parole eligibility. Arrests over the drug in California rose from 140 per year in 1935 to 5,155 in 1960. The 1960s counterculture accelerated its use among California's youth; arrests peaked in 1974 at 103,097, most of them felonies.

=== The Lovin' Spoonful ===
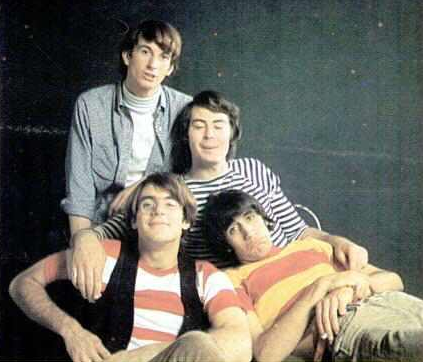
The Lovin' Spoonful in a 1965 promotional photograph; clockwise from top left: Steve Boone, Joe Butler, Zal Yanovsky and John Sebastian

In 1966, the Lovin' Spoonful were one of the most successful pop music groups in the US. (Note: In the band's first year of releasing music, their first four singles reached the Top Ten of Billboard magazine's Hot 100 chart, two of which reached number two. In March 1966, they recorded their fifth single, "Summer in the City", and it became their biggest hit when it topped the US charts that August.) The band, who formed in New York City's Greenwich Village neighborhood in late 1964, mostly consisted of New Yorkers, but their lead guitarist Zal Yanovsky was originally from Toronto, Canada. The band were among the earliest popularizers of folk rock – a popular genre blending folk and rock music which grew from the American folk music revival in Greenwich Village in the early 1960s. By 1966, America's pop-music scene shifted towards West Coast cities like San Francisco and Los Angeles, and other early folk-rock acts, such as the Byrds and the Mamas & the Papas, located themselves there. Amid the transition, the Spoonful remained based in New York City, but their image and sound proved influential in the emerging San Francisco scene, particularly in the city's Haight-Ashbury district, a center of the 1960s counterculture.

The Spoonful visited San Francisco several times in the second half of 1965; they played for two weeks in July and August 1965 at Mother's Nightclub, which then advertised itself as the "world's first psychedelic nightclub", and they appeared for a week in October at the hungry i, one of the most prominent clubs in America's folk-music scene. (Note: The band expressed in one interview that they had been better received in California than anywhere else. Yanovsky reflected years later that the band's first two West Coast appearances were the high points of his time with the band.) On October 24, they headlined a dance party at the Longshoreman's Union Hall in the city's Fisherman's Wharf neighborhood. Organized by the concert-production collective Family Dog Productions, the event combined rock music with light shows and psychedelic drugs, and it was among the earliest events of its kind in San Francisco; Erik Jacobsen, the Spoonful's producer, reflected, "That whole idea of going and listening to music and getting high started there". In attendance at the Longshoreman's show were members of the Grateful Dead, a jug band who were inspired by the Spoonful's performance to similarly "go electric" in their style. (Note: The Grateful Dead held their first recording session with electric instruments ten days later, on November 3. Later that month, they adopted similar clothing to the Spoonful for their first professional photo session.)

== Bust and cooperation ==
In early 1966, the Spoonful toured college campuses across the US. They arrived in San Francisco on May 20, where they were scheduled to play the following evening at the University of California, Berkeley. The day they arrived, Yanovsky and Steve Boone, the band's bassist, attended a party in the city's Pacific Heights neighborhood at the home of Bill Loughborough. (Note: Later sources provide Bill's last name as Love, but contemporary articles refer to him as Loughborough. An article in the Berkeley Barb identifies him as "Bill (Will B. Love) Loughborough".) Loughborough managed the Committee, a San Francisco-based improv comedy group, and he met Boone and Yanovsky through a mutual acquaintance, Larry Hankin. (Note: Hankin was a member of the Committee since its founding in 1963, and he befriended the Spoonful after they saw his stand-up routine in a Greenwich Village coffeehouse. They invited him to serve as an opening act on one of their tours, and he contributed to their 1966 album Hums of the Lovin' Spoonful.) Loughborough sold the pair a "lid" – contemporary West Coast slang for roughly one ounce (28 g) of marijuana. Boone and Yanovsky left the party in their rental car and were pulled over by the police, who searched the vehicle and discovered one ounce of the drug. (Note: Boone admitted in his autobiography that he was driving both high and drunk, but he did not recall speeding or driving unusually. The author Joel Selvin instead writes the pair drew the attention of police after making "an illegal, high-speed U-turn".)

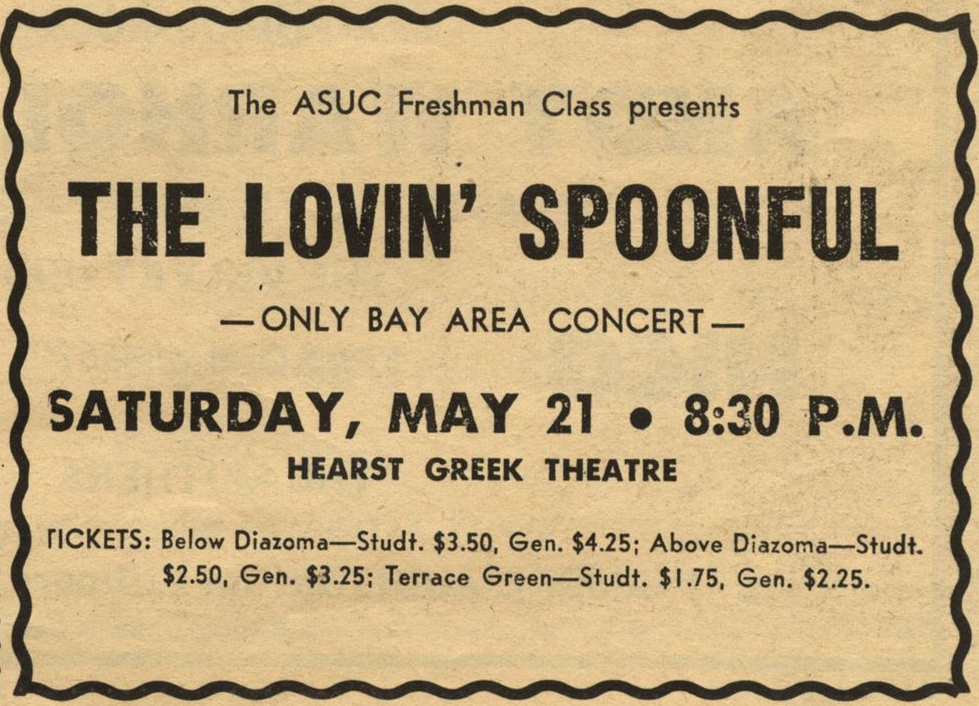
Yanovsky and Boone were bailed out the morning after the bust and performed that night's scheduled show at UC Berkeley (Berkeley Barb ad pictured).

Boone and Yanovsky were arrested and spent the night in jail. Rich Chiaro, the band's road manager, bailed them out the following morning. The band's manager Bob Cavallo and Charles Koppelman, who had signed them to his entertainment company, flew to San Francisco to begin managing the situation. The band's two other members – John Sebastian and Joe Butler – were not immediately informed on the details of the bust; Sebastian was in Los Angeles at the time, and he later recalled only being told it had happened several days later. The band performed as scheduled on the evening of May 21 at UC Berkeley's Greek Theatre, playing for an hour in-front of 5,500 concertgoers. (Note: In an interview held backstage of the show, Yanovsky explained to a journalist that, because he was still a Canadian citizen, he had renewed his six-month working visa three times. He added he hoped to become an American citizen because, "[i]t's just too much bother".)

At a meeting with San Francisco police and the District Attorney, Yanovsky was threatened with deportation to Canada. Yanovsky feared that, if he was deported, he would never be allowed to reenter the US. Melvin Belli, an attorney whom Cavallo and Koppelman hired, expressed to Yanovsky and Boone that they were unlikely to win on the merits of their case and that their only way to avoid charges was to cooperate with authorities. The two initially balked at the idea, but they relented to avoid Yanovsky being deported, something they expected would lead to a breakup of the band.

Yanovsky and Boone cooperated with authorities to name their drug source, directing an undercover operative at a local party on May 25. In exchange, all charges were dropped, their arrest records were expunged, the two did not need to appear in court and there was no publicity related to their arrest.

== Trial and sentencing ==
Police initially arrested Loughborough's girlfriend, Sandy Smith, but she was released without being charged. Loughborough's arrest followed in September 1966, and preliminary hearings for his case began in early December. Around that time, knowledge of Yanovsky and Boone's involvement as informants became more widespread on the West Coast, particularly in San Francisco. In an attempt to quash the story, the band's management offered to pay for Loughborough's defense attorney or to pay for his silence regarding the matter, options which he refused. (Note: Loughborough told the Berkeley Barb that Cavallo sent him US$2500 in one-hundred-dollar bills (equivalent to US$24,000 in 2025).)

Loughborough was convicted on June 5, 1967, on two counts of the sale of marijuana. In January 1968, the Superior Court Judge Joseph Karesh sentenced him to three months in county jail followed by three years of probation. Loughborough's motion for a new trial included affidavits signed by Boone, Yanovsky, Cavallo, Hankin and Smith, all of whom alleged that the prosecution's chief witness, a San Francisco police officer, perjured himself on the witness stand. The judge denied the motion, and Loughborough served his time in jail. Loughborough reflected at the time: "The sentence was much less than I expected ... I got off lightly if you consider the implications".

== Counterculture reaction ==
=== Boycott and picketing attempts ===
By early 1967, the underground press circulated news of the bust and generally criticized Yanovsky and Boone for acting as informants. Excerpts of the court transcript were photocopied and hung in public places across San Francisco. Chester Anderson, a counter-cultural activist from Haight-Ashbury, denounced the Spoonful in a broadside issued through the Communications Company (ComCo), a publishing group he founded. He distributed his leaflet to numerous underground newspapers, including the Berkeley Barb, the Los Angeles Free Press and the East Village Other. Boone remembered the Berkeley Barb being the first to cover the bust; the newspaper placed the story on its front page in February 1967. California radio stations, including those operated by the Pacifica Network, covered the story extensively. (Note: Bill Kerby wrote in August 1967 that he first heard the story "[a]bout six months ago" on a Pacifica station, before he read about it in the Berkeley Barb.)

Loughborough led efforts to boycott the Lovin' Spoonful. In July 1967, he took out a full-page ad in the Los Angeles Free Press which related the story before urging readers to destroy their Spoonful records, skip their concerts and avoid having sex with members of the band. The musician Cyril Jordan recalled hearing that Bill Graham, a prominent concert promoter in the San Francisco area, was asked to blacklist the Spoonful. Some authors suggest the bust and its fallout was the reason for the band's absence from the Monterey International Pop Festival, a music festival held in June 1967 on California's Central Coast. The festival signalled a major geographical shift in America's pop music scene, and the author Jon Savage suggests the band's treatment by the counterculture stemmed from the broader inter-city rivalries between the West and East Coast amid the pop scene's transition.

Attending [their concert tonight], buying the records, or in any way passing the word around about the Spoonful's commercial activities, is supporting THE MAN. And making it possible for the same fucking thing to happen again, everywhere. ... The money taken in from this concert ... is going into the pockets of generals on Death's staff.

— Jim Brodey, Los Angeles Free Press, July 1967

In his autobiography, Boone recalled the Spoonful's West Coast shows being picketed by members of the counterculture, who he says carried signs accusing the band of being "finks" and traitors to the movement. In the same issue of the Free Press as Loughborough's ad, Jim Brodey, a New York-based counterculture writer, encouraged readers to picket the Spoonful's July 28 concert at the Hollywood Bowl, and he called for the opening act, Simon & Garfunkel, to pull out of the show. The concert was nearly sold out and no protest materialized. Reviewing the show for Cash Box magazine, an anonymous reviewer wrote that the Spoonful "never quite clicked with the crowd", whose "response was barely better than perfunctory", but the reviewer determined the concert was probably not representative of the Spoonful and was simply an "off-night" for the band. (Note: Mike Pearce, a Free Press journalist, wrote that KRLA sponsoring the concert put the station "in a less than flattering light". KRLA's program director, John Barrett, responded that he defended the right of people to protest "and to get stoned", but he felt the Spoonful still had a "right to perform".)

=== Defenders ===
The biggest underground cancer in the rock scene this past year has been the Lovin' Spoonful situation. ... "Shove that hot lead up my ass and I'll name everybody," Lenny Bruce once said. That's reality. ... If what Zal and Steve did is a sin, then it is our sin, too. They are victims, just as the man who was fingered is a victim. Just as we are all victims. Do we REALLY want to be selling postcards of the hanging?

— Ralph J. Gleason, Rolling Stone, November 1967

Among the Spoonful's defenders were the California-based music critics Ralph J. Gleason, Bill Kerby and Pete Johnson. Kerby, who wrote for the Free Press, defended the band in the newspaper's August 4 issue, arguing that readers should instead save their vitriol for the "Establishment". In the following week's issue, the newspaper's letters section featured five letters, all of which disparaged the boycott and picketing efforts. Among the letter writers was Johnson, a critic for The Los Angeles Times, who wrote in another piece that week that those angry at the Spoonful had "[violated] the integrity of their ethic" by engaging in "McCarthy-like tactics", rather than in the "philosophy of love, flowers and freedom 'to do your thing.'"

Gleason, a co-founder of the San Francisco-based rock magazine Rolling Stone, wrote a piece regarding the bust in the magazine's second issue, dated November 1967. In his piece, he argued that the reaction against the Spoonful was worse than Yanovsky and Boone's decision to cooperate. He concluded that the band's treatment was "the biggest underground cancer in the rock scene", and he encouraged readers to continue buying the band's records. Sebastian later said he thought Gleason's piece "set things right", but that it was published too late to have been influential. (Note: Some authors, including Gary Pig Gold, suggest that Rolling Stone led the boycott of the Spoonful, but Gleason's piece defending the band was the only coverage the magazine devoted to the situation.)

== Aftermath ==
=== Intra-band tensions, Yanovsky fired ===
Some hippies have dropped the Lovin' Spoonful and some have not ... Of course, losing some friends has hurt them psychologically.

— Erik Jacobsen, June 1967

The public revelations regarding Boone and Yanovsky's cooperation generated tensions within the band. Sebastian and Butler were generally ignorant of the bust's details until the underground press began reporting on it. The pair were enthusiastic about the emerging hippie scene, and Boone writes, "it had to be hard to know they were being associated in the minds of the movement with finks". Some in the hippie movement ceased to be friends with the band. Cass Elliot, a long-time friend of the band and the one who introduced Sebastian and Yanovsky to one another, recalled attendees at the Monterey Pop festival urging her to stop talking with Yanovsky. She dismissed the suggestion as "ridiculous", adding that he remained "one of [her] best friends". Jacobsen suggested the band losing other friendships "hurt them psychologically".

Boone recalled the bust distracting him from his songwriting, leading to disillusionment from Sebastian, who was left to write nearly all of the band's music. In late 1966, while they continued to stress over their situation, Boone and Yanovsky collaborated for the first time on a composition. The pair hoped their resultant song, "The Dance of Pain and Pleasure", could serve as catharsis, but it was poorly received by their bandmates and Erik Jacobsen, and it was never recorded or developed further. (Note: Boone's only songwriting contribution to the Spoonful's 1967 album Everything Playing was "Forever", an instrumental he wrote while reflecting on the bust and Yanovsky's subsequent firing.)

Sebastian remembered that the counterculture's reaction to the bust "shattered" Yanovsky's feelings regarding "the band, [the music, the business], and the generation of love". In the months that followed, Yanovsky began drinking more heavily, and his behavior both on- and off-stage became increasingly erratic. Often disagreeing with the band's creative direction, which was being increasingly dictated by Sebastian, Yanovsky began regularly threatening to quit the band. Boone recalled that the relationship between Sebastian and Yanovsky became stilted due to the latter's tendency towards rebelling rather than communicating his concerns directly. (Note: Yanovsky especially disliked Sebastian's song "Darling Be Home Soon". When the band appeared on The Ed Sullivan Show in January 1967 to promote its release as a single, Yanovsky attached a rubber-toad figurine to his guitar, and he mugged for the camera. The appearance led to laughter from the audience and anger from Sebastian.) Yanovsky remembered tensions culminating after a flight back to New York, when he expressed to Sebastian that "his songwriting [had] really gone down the toilet", and that it was time for him to return to the "'risk element'" which characterized his earlier writing.

In May 1967, Sebastian convened a band meeting in which he issued an ultimatum that he would leave the group unless Yanovsky was fired. In a subsequent group meeting at Sebastian's apartment, the band informed Yanovsky that he had been fired, though he also agreed to continue performing the rest of the band's scheduled dates. He last performed with the Spoonful on June 24, 1967, at the Forest Hills Music Festival in New York. (Note: In an interview held four days after he left the band, Yanovsky agreed with the interviewer's assessment that the Spoonful had done little of note after their tour of England, held in April 1966, a month before the bust.)

=== Diminished commercial success ===
The Lovin' Spoonful saw diminished commercial success in 1967, and they disbanded in June 1968. After Yanovsky's departure, only one of the band's singles entered the American top 40. Richard Goldstein, a music critic who was among band's earliest champions, wrote at the time of Yanovsky's departure that it marked the end of the group "as we knew them". He added that though the band still possessed their "greatest asset" in Sebastian's songwriting, it was Yanovsky who "brought the Spoonful home in living color". The singer Judy Henske – who was married to Yanovsky's replacement in the band, Jerry Yester – offered a similar assessment, saying in retrospect that, "The Lovin' Spoonful without Zalman was nothing".

Later authors sometimes identify the bust as the incident which shortened the Spoonful's career. Boone and the author Hank Bordowitz later said that the counterculture's boycott hurt the band's commercial performance; Bordowitz suggests that the band's loss of "counterculture credibility" effectively ended their commercial viability, an opinion shared by Cyril Jordan, who said the incident "was the first time you saw how much power the underground had", and it "was the end of [the Spoonful]".

The Spoonful has been concentrating on week-end college concerts. They are very popular with non-hip, average college-Joe types, whom, fortunately for the Spoonful's commercial health, outnumber the hippies.

— KRLA Beat, July 1967

The author Richie Unterberger contends that the effects of the boycott have likely been overestimated, since "most of the people who bought Spoonful records were average teenage Americans, not hippies". He instead connects the band's commercial struggles to the expanding popularity of the genre psychedelia, to which folk-rock acts struggled to transition, further contending that their creative struggles likely stemmed from the bust and the resulting "spiralling personal difficulties". In July 1967, Erik Jacobsen said to KRLA Beat, a Southern California music magazine, that the band's popularity had not been noticeably hurt. He added that though there were more hippies on the West Coast, the Spoonful's latest single, "Six O'Clock", had received more airplay there than on the East Coast. (Note: "Six O'Clock" was the Spoonful's second single which failed to enter the US top ten, peaking instead at number 18, but on KRLA Beat's chart it reached number eight.)

== Legacy ==
Numerous jazz musicians were arrested in the 1950s for possessing illegal drugs – typically marijuana or heroin – but Boone and Yanovsky's arrests marked the first time 1960s pop musicians were busted for doing so. (Note: Jazz musicians arrested in the 1950s included Art Pepper, Lester Young, Hampton Hawes, Thelonious Monk and Billie Holiday. The country singer Johnny Cash was arrested in October 1965 for attempting to smuggle amphetamines and sedatives across the Mexico–United States border, but his pills were prescription narcotics and not illicit.) Three weeks later, on June 10, 1966, Donovan became the first British pop star to be arrested for possessing marijuana. In the years that followed, numerous pop musicians were arrested for possessing marijuana or LSD, more often in Britain than in the United States. Boone suggests in retrospect that, owing to the novelty of the situation, the Spoonful's management had no plan in place on how to handle a drug bust.

In the US, the Grateful Dead, Jefferson Airplane and Buffalo Springfield were among the bands whose members were sometimes arrested for possessing drugs. Multiple arrests forced Bruce Palmer, a Canadian member of Buffalo Springfield, to voluntarily depart to Canada in January 1967. (Note: Palmer returned to Buffalo Springfield months later, but, after he was arrested several more times, his bandmates fired him in January 1968. His immigration issues led to difficulties for the group, which disbanded that May.) The Grateful Dead struck a defiant tone to the San Francisco press after two of their members were arrested in Haight-Ashbury in October 1967. The academic Nicholas G. Meriwether writes the reaction was instrumental in establishing the Dead's strong reputation within the counterculture, particularly after the Spoonful's situation had "served as a stark example of the pressure and peril of cooperating with the police".

== See also ==
- The Rolling Stones' Redlands bust (1967)
- Trial of Jimi Hendrix (1969)
- Waylon Jennings' 1977 arrest

== Sources ==
- Boone, Steve; Moss, Tony (2014). Hotter Than a Match Head: My Life on the Run with The Lovin' Spoonful. Toronto: ECW Press. ISBN 978-1-77041-193-7 – via the Internet Archive.
- Bordowitz, Hank (2011). Billy Joel: The Life and Times of an Angry Young Man (Revised and Updated ed.). San Francisco: Backbeat Books. ISBN 978-1-61713-078-6 – via Google Books.
- Bunch, Adam (2017). The Toronto Book of the Dead. Toronto: Dundurn. ISBN 978-1-4597-3806-5 – via the Internet Archive.
- Diken, Dennis (2003). Hums of the Lovin' Spoonful (Liner notes). The Lovin' Spoonful. Kama Sutra. 74465 99732 2.
- Doggett, Peter (2011). You Never Give Me Your Money: The Beatles After the Breakup. New York City: It Books. ISBN 978-0-06-177418-8 – via Google Books.
- Einarson, John; Furay, Richie (2004). For What It's Worth: The Story of Buffalo Springfield (Updated ed.). New York City: Cooper Square Press. ISBN 978-0-8154-1281-6.
- Fletcher, Tony (2009). All Hopped Up and Ready to Go: Music from the Streets of New York 1927–77. New York City: W.W. Norton. ISBN 978-0-393-33483-8 – via the Internet Archive.
- Gould, Jonathan (2007). Can't Buy Me Love: The Beatles, Britain, and America. New York City: Three Rivers Press. ISBN 978-0-307-35337-5 – via the Internet Archive.
- Hankin, Larry (2024). That Guy: A Cautionary Memoir (Print replica ed.). Orlando, Florida: BearManor Media. ISBN 979-8-88771-115-7 – via Amazon Kindle.
- Helander, Brock (1999). The Rockin' 60s: The People Who Made the Music. New York City: Schirmer Books. ISBN 978-0-02-864873-6 – via the Internet Archive.
- Heylin, Clinton (2007). The Act You've Known for All These Years: The Life, and Afterlife, of Sgt. Pepper. Edinburgh: Canongate. ISBN 978-1-84195-955-9 – via the Internet Archive.
- Hitchens, Peter (2012). The War We Never Fought: The British Establishment's Surrender to Drugs. London: Bloomsbury Publishing. ISBN 978-1-4411-7331-7 – via the Internet Archive.
- Hoskyns, Barney (1997). Beneath the Diamond Sky: Haight Ashbury 1965–1970. New York City: Simon & Schuster. ISBN 978-0-684-84180-9 – via the Internet Archive.
- Jackson, Andrew Grant (2015). 1965: The Most Revolutionary Year in Music. New York City: Macmillan Publishers. ISBN 978-1-4668-6497-9 – via the Internet Archive.
- Matijas-Mecca, Christian (2020). Listen to Psychedelic Rock! Exploring a Musical Genre. Santa Barbara: ABC-CLIO. ISBN 978-1-4408-6198-7 – via Google Books.
- May, Kirse Granat (2002). Golden State, Golden Youth: The California Image in Popular Culture, 1955–1966. Chapel Hill: University of North Carolina Press. ISBN 978-0-8078-2695-9 – via the Internet Archive.
- McNally, Dennis (2003). A Long Strange Trip: The Inside History of the Grateful Dead. New York City: Broadway Books. ISBN 978-0-307-41877-7 – via Google Books.
- Miles, Barry (2009). The British Invasion. New York City: Sterling Publishing Company, Inc. ISBN 978-1-4027-6976-4 – via Google Books.
- Myers, Marc (2017). Anatomy of a Song: The Oral History of 45 Iconic Hits That Changed Rock, R&B and Pop. London: Grove Press. ISBN 978-1-61185-959-1 – via the Internet Archive.
- Peck, Abe (1985). Uncovering the Sixties: The Life and Times of the Underground Press. New York City: Pantheon Books. ISBN 978-0-394-52793-2 – via the Internet Archive.
- Pollock, Bruce (1984). When the Music Mattered: Rock in the 1960s. New York City: Holt, Rinehart and Winston. ISBN 0-03-060421-4 – via the Internet Archive.
- Rees, Dafydd; Crampton, Luke (1991). Rock Movers & Shakers. New York City: Billboard Books. ISBN 978-0-8230-7609-3 – via the Internet Archive.
- Rendon, Jim (2012). Super-Charged: How Outlaws, Hippies, and Scientists Reinvented Marijuana. Portland, Oregon: Timber Press. ISBN 978-1-60469-413-0 – via Google Books.
- Savage, Jon (2015). 1966: The Year the Decade Exploded. London: Faber & Faber. ISBN 978-0-571-27762-9 – via the Internet Archive.
- Selvin, Joel (1995). Summer of Love: The Inside Story of LSD, Rock & Roll, Free Love and High Times in the Wild West. New York City: Plume. ISBN 978-0-452-27407-5 – via the Internet Archive.
- Shapiro, Harry; Glebbeek, Caesar (1995). Jimi Hendrix: Electric Gypsy (New and Improved ed.). New York City: St. Martin's Griffin. ISBN 978-0-312-13062-6 – via the Internet Archive.
- Shea, Scott G. (2023). All the Leaves Are Brown: How the Mamas & the Papas Came Together and Broke Apart. Lanham: Rowman & Littlefield. ISBN 978-1-4930-7212-5 – via Google Books.
- Shea, Stuart; Rodriguez, Robert (2007). Fab Four FAQ: Everything Left to Know About the Beatles ... and More!. New York City: Hal Leonard. ISBN 978-1-4234-2138-2 – via the Internet Archive.
- Unterberger, Richie (2002). Turn! Turn! Turn!: The '60s Folk-Rock Revolution. San Francisco: Backbeat Books. ISBN 0-87930-703-X – via the Internet Archive.
- Unterberger, Richie (2003). Eight Miles High: Folk-Rock's Flight from Haight-Ashbury to Woodstock. San Francisco: Backbeat Books. ISBN 0-87930-743-9 – via the Internet Archive.
