= Norman Pilcher =

British police officer (1935–2021)

- Born: 1 June 1935
- Died: 14 March 2021 (aged 85)
- Occupation: Police officer

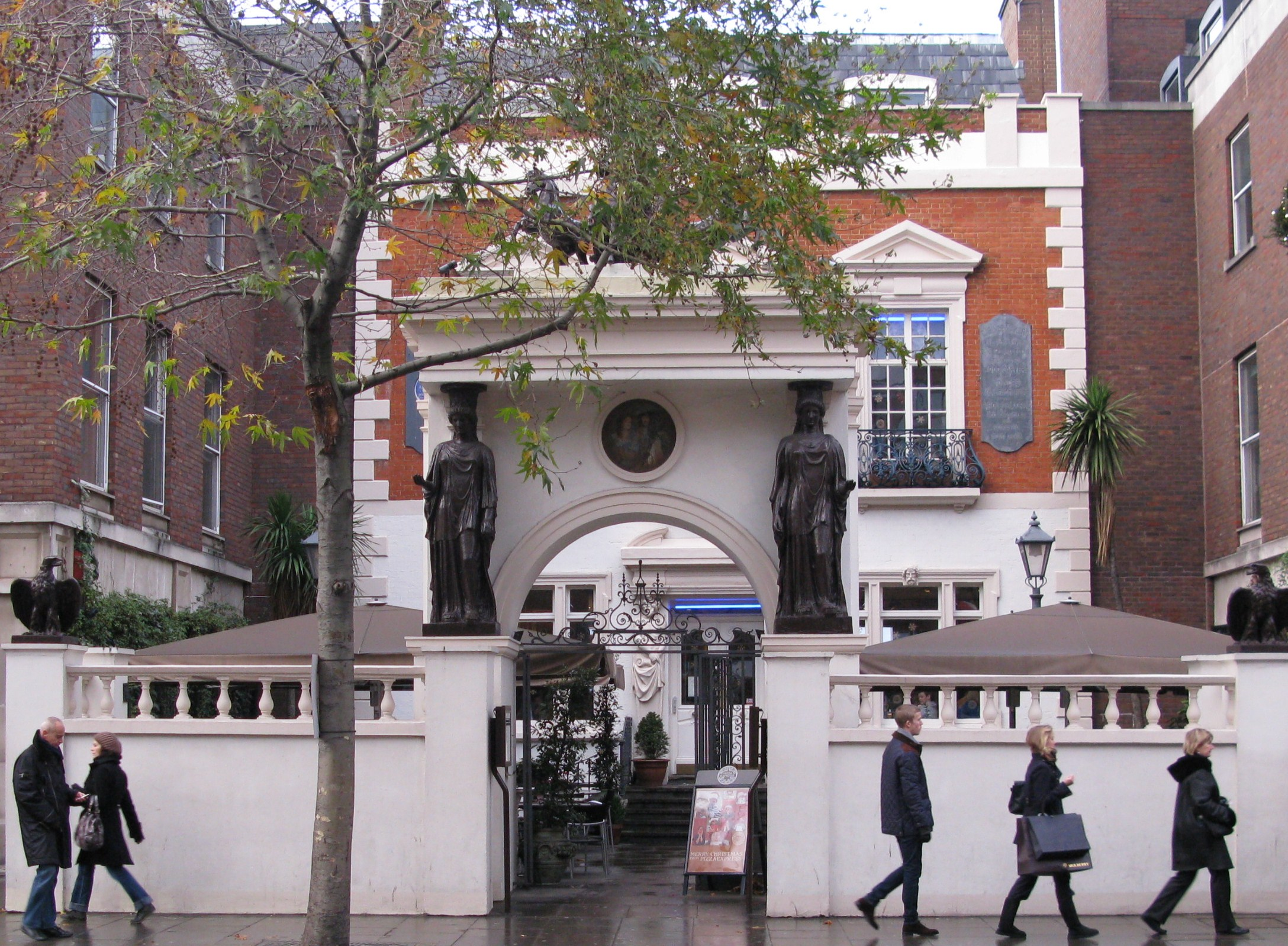
The Pheasantry in 2009

Norman Clement Pilcher (1 June 1935 – 14 March 2021) was a British police officer. After a transfer from the Flying Squad to the Drug Squad in 1967, Norman ("Nobby") Pilcher became notorious for the vigour with which he pinned possession of drugs charges on pop stars and hippies, and for the dubious methods employed in his undercover operations, which included paying off informers with drugs.

Pilcher was born on 1 June 1935. He became notorious for arresting a number of celebrities during the 1960s on drug charges, including Mick Jagger and Keith Richards of the Rolling Stones in February 1967; Brian Jones, also from the Stones; Donovan; and two members of the Beatles, George Harrison and John Lennon. Eric Clapton was nearly arrested at The Pheasantry on drugs charges, but escaped from the rear of the building when Pilcher rang the doorbell to announce "postman, special delivery".

Several celebrities complained that Detective Sergeant Pilcher had framed them, or was only carrying out raids and arrests to satisfy the tabloid newspapers. As is evident from reports in the alternative press and histories of that time, it was widely believed that Pilcher was frequently planting the drugs his victims were convicted of possessing, though this has never been proven.

Pilcher's reputation was damaged in the early 1970s after it was claimed during the drug smuggling trial of Basil Sands, that the defendant (who had been caught red-handed) was innocent, and had been working with the police. After the judge directed the jury to discount any private belief they might have that Pilcher's superior, Victor Kelaher, was at the centre of a drug-smuggling ring, since this was something that should be addressed at a subsequent trial, Sands was convicted and was sentenced to seven years' imprisonment.

On 8 November 1972, Pilcher was charged with conspiracy to pervert the course of justice after it was alleged he had committed perjury. He resigned from the police force before the case came to court. In September 1973 Pilcher was convicted and sentenced to four years' imprisonment, with the judge admonishing the disgraced ex-policeman, "You poisoned the wells of criminal justice, and set about it deliberately."

Pilcher was the subject of the 2003 Primus song "Pilcher's Squad". In The Guardian Alan Travis wrote that it is widely believed that the lyric "Semolina Pilchard" in the Beatles' song "I Am the Walrus" refers to Pilcher. Monty Python lampooned him as "Spiny Norman" in their Piranha Brothers sketch; in another Python sketch, Graham Chapman's police character tells a man that he's under arrest and must come with him to the police station because "I'm charging you with illegal possession of whatever we happen to have down there." In Eric Idle's 1978 Beatles pastiche The Rutles, he was satirised as 'Brian Plant'.

Norman Pilcher's memoirs, entitled Bent Coppers, were released in late September 2020. Pilcher died from cancer on 14 March 2021, at the age of 85. His death was not widely publicised until July 2023.
