= Trial of Jimi Hendrix =

1969 trial

Canadian drug charges and trial of Jimi Hendrix
- Hendrix's booking photos at the time of his arrest in Toronto, May 3, 1969
- Date: May 3, 1969
- Location: Toronto International Airport
- Cause: Heroin and hashish found in luggage
- Verdict: Not guilty

In 1969, the American rock musician Jimi Hendrix, then at the height of his career, was arrested, tried, and acquitted in Canada for drug possession. On May 3, 1969, customs agents at Toronto International Airport detained Hendrix after finding a small amount of what they suspected to be heroin and hashish in his luggage. Four hours later, after a mobile lab confirmed what had been found, he was formally charged with drug possession. Released on $10,000 bail, Hendrix was required to return on May 5 for an arraignment hearing. During a performance at Maple Leaf Gardens later that night, he displayed a jovial attitude, joking with the audience and singing a few lines of mock opera for comedic effect.

At a preliminary hearing on June 19, Judge Robert Taylor set a date for December 8, at which Hendrix would stand trial for two counts of illegal possession of narcotics, for which he faced as many as 20 years in prison. While there was no question as to whether the drugs were in Hendrix's luggage, for the Crown to prove possession they had to show that he knew they were there. In his cross-examination of Canadian customs officials, defense attorney John O'Driscoll raised doubts about whether the narcotics belonged to Hendrix, who had no drug paraphernalia in his luggage or needle tracks on his arms. After a trial that lasted for three days, the jury deliberated for 8 hours before returning a not guilty verdict, acquitting Hendrix of both charges.

The incident proved stressful for Hendrix, and it weighed heavily on his mind during the seven months that he awaited trial. Two weeks after the arrest, he told his friend, the journalist Sharon Lawrence, that his fear of needles discouraged him from using heroin and that associating with "junkies" dependent on heroin had convinced him it was not a drug he wanted to use. Both of Hendrix's Experience bandmates, Mitch Mitchell and Noel Redding, later stated that they had been warned about a planned drug bust the day before flying to Toronto and they believed that drugs had been planted in Hendrix's bag. Although Hendrix was one of the biggest stars in North America at the time, and the world's highest-paid performer, only a couple of Toronto newspapers carried the story. His public relations manager, Michael Goldstein, later revealed that he bribed a member of the Associated Press with a case of liquor in an effort to prevent the story from going out on the news wire.

== Background ==
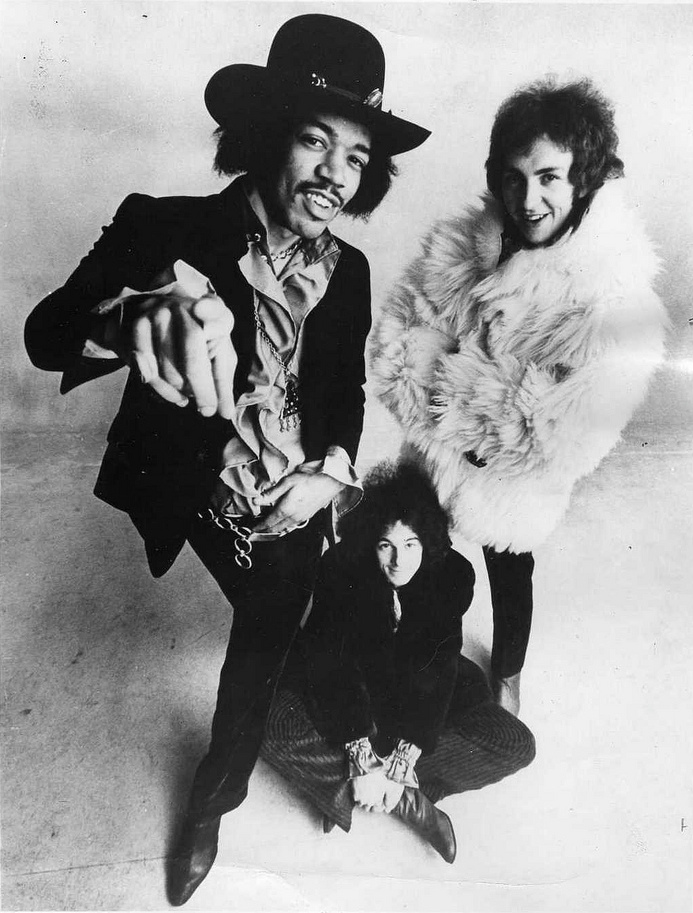
The Jimi Hendrix Experience in 1968, around the time that they were living in Benedict Canyon

In late 1968, the members of the Jimi Hendrix Experience were living in a rented house in Benedict Canyon, Los Angeles. One night, bassist Noel Redding was warned about a pending visit from law enforcement, so he immediately phoned drummer Mitch Mitchell, who was at the nightclub Whisky a Go Go, and asked him to come over to the house so that they could search for and remove any illegal drugs. They found a large assortment of substances in Hendrix's room that had apparently been given to him by fans. Soon afterwards, they were paid a visit by three detectives who told them that they were under police surveillance by officers living in a nearby house.

On May 2, 1969, the Experience performed at Cobo Hall in Detroit. According to Mitchell, while they were getting ready for the show, the band and their entourage were informed about a possible drug bust planned for the following day. The group's road crew warned everyone to take precautions against any potential for drugs to be planted on them. Mitchell responded by wearing a suit without pockets and not wearing any underwear. Tour managers Gerry Stickells and Tony Ruffino expressed their concern to Hendrix and asked him if he had any drugs on him, to which he replied: "No." After arriving in Toronto, he was awoken by concert promoter Ron Terry, who told him: "Whatever you got in that bag, get rid of it." Terry then took him into the plane's bathroom and dumped anything that might be mistaken for illegal drugs into the toilet. Terry commented: "I thought he was clean."

== Arrest, performance, and arraignment ==
After landing at Toronto International Airport on May 3, 1969, Hendrix and Terry were the last to exit the plane. Ruffino was carrying Hendrix's bags, and he placed them on a counter at the customs station. An agent immediately chastised him, shouting: "If that's not yours, keep your hands off it", to which Ruffino replied: "I work for him." The agent repeated the order before asking Hendrix if they were his bags; he confirmed that they were. At 9:30 a.m., authorities detained Hendrix after finding a small amount of what they suspected to be heroin and hashish in his luggage. (Note: According to Mitchell, the band was met at their plane, then escorted to separate rooms where they were searched.) A mobile lab was set up to determine what had been found, and at 1:30 p.m. Metro police detective Harry Midgley arrested him for illegal possession of narcotics. After being booked, fingerprinted, and photographed, he was released on $10,000 bail and required to return on May 5 for an arraignment hearing. (Note: In 2018, the fingerprint card from Hendrix's booking was placed at auction. It was sold on March 15 for $29,248.10, including the buyer's premium.) While they awaited the lab results, Stickells attempted to make contact with Hendrix's manager, Mike Jeffery, who had traveled to Hawaii and was unavailable.

When Stickells expressed concern that the arrest might jeopardize the concert that was scheduled for that night at Maple Leaf Gardens, the booking detective assured them that he would "get it done as quickly" as he could because his children had tickets for the event; he commented: "they'll kill me if I don't get [Hendrix] out." Management at the Gardens pressured the Toronto police department to release him, complaining that the sell-out crowd of 18,000 fans might riot if they canceled the show. He was released by 8 p.m. and escorted to the venue by the police, who remained at the arena throughout the performance. He displayed a jovial attitude during the concert, joking with the audience and singing in a mock operatic style for comedic effect. In light of the arrest, he altered the lyrics to "Red House", singing "soon as I get out of jail, I wanna see her."

Rolling Stone magazine reported that during the arraignment hearing, which lasted for three minutes, the courthouse was filled with young fans who had come to show their support for Hendrix, who "entered wearing a pink shirt open to the waist, an Apache-style headband, a multi-colored scarf around his neck and beads. His manner was dead serious."

== Preliminary hearing ==
On June 19, 1969, Hendrix flew to Toronto for a preliminary hearing. He wore a business suit for the first time since before the formation of the Experience in late 1966. Judge Robert Taylor presided over the hearing, setting a date for December 8, at which Hendrix would stand trial for two counts of possession of heroin and hashish, for which he faced as much as 20 years in prison. More serious potential charges of drug transporting and trafficking, which had been discussed at the time of the arrest, were not filed.

== Second Toronto arrest ==
In preparation for the trial, Hendrix had his hair cut, and he purchased new clothes. One of his defense lawyers, Bob Levine, commented: "I took him to a number of stores that specialized in tailored suits. We found a conservative suit that looked great on him. It was hilarious. He was like a hick, awkwardly fidgeting around and trying to loosen his tie. I didn't care how uncomfortable he was; the suit was perfect."

On December 7, while Hendrix and Levine were travelling by limousine to a New York airport for their flight to Toronto, Levine noticed that Hendrix was putting some personal items into his guitar case. Levine then reminded him that they would be going through customs and that they had better not bring anything inappropriate. He reassured Levine, but as they approached their destination, Levine confronted him: "Jimi, I know you have something in that guitar case. I don't know what it is, and it's not normally my business to interfere, but I know we will be searched at customs." Hendrix insisted that he had nothing to worry about, stating: "Trust me, Bob, no one is going to recognize me", to which he replied: "Recognize you? They will be waiting at customs for you." Soon after their arrival at the Toronto airport, Hendrix was arrested by customs agents who found a capsule of an unknown substance in his guitar case. He spent the night in jail, waiting for it to be tested. Later that day, the Toronto police department dropped the charges when the pill was determined to be a legal medication. (Note: In 2006, Sharon Lawrence wrote that when she asked Hendrix about what he had put in his guitar case he replied: "Something to blot it all out for a while if I get sent away.")

== Trial ==
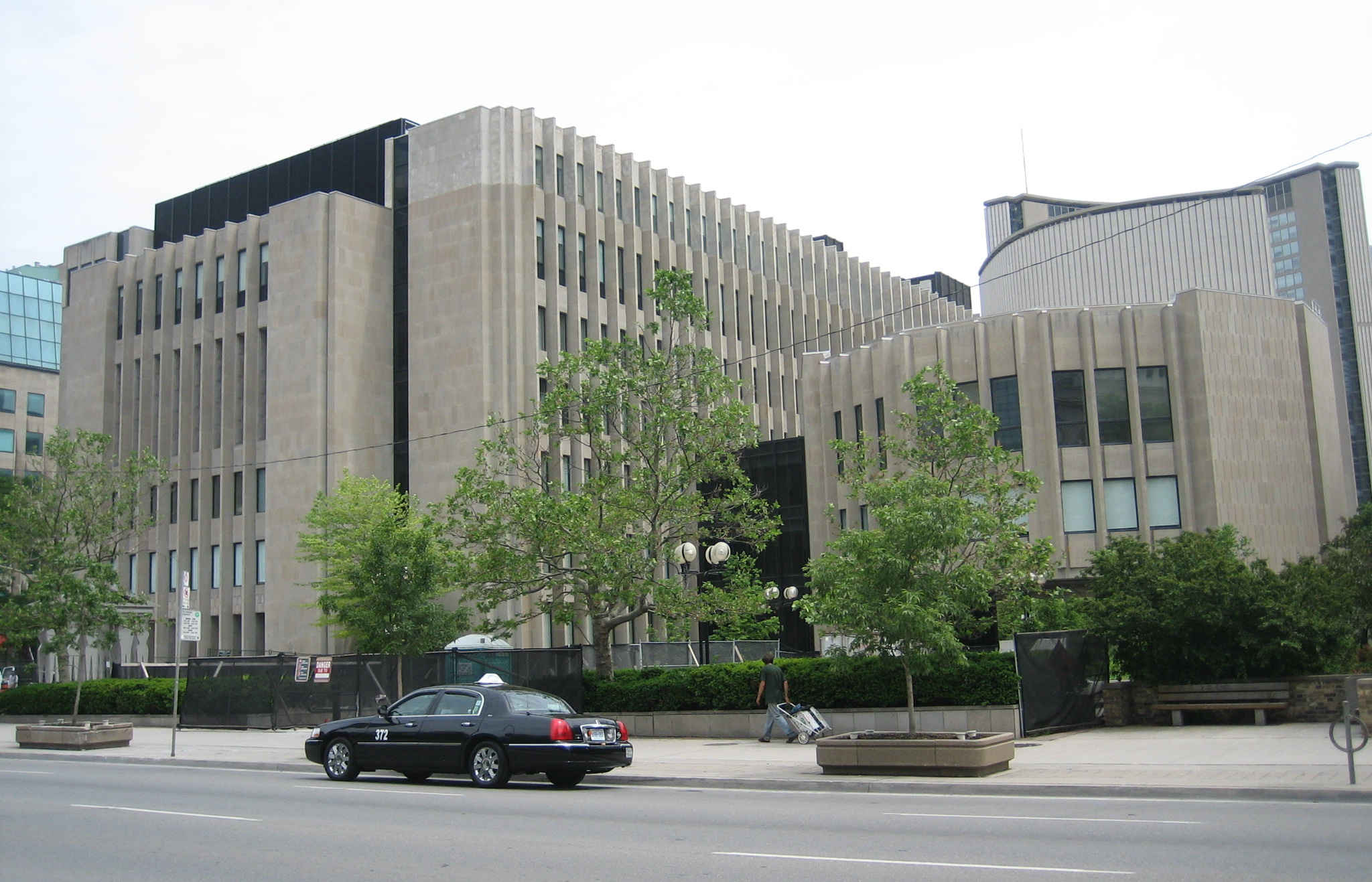
York County Courthouse, Toronto, Ontario, where Hendrix's trial took place

While there was no question as to whether the drugs were in Hendrix's luggage, in order for the Crown to prove possession, they had to show that he knew they were there. Judge Joseph Kelly presided over the trial proceedings, which began on December 8, 1969. Crown counsel John Malone called as witnesses the officers who discovered the drugs and the lab technicians who identified them as heroin; the prosecution rested after three hours of testimony. In his cross-examination of Canadian customs officials, defense attorney John O'Driscoll raised doubts about whether the drugs belonged to Hendrix. Mervin Wilson, the customs agent who discovered the drugs, agreed with O'Driscoll's assertion that Hendrix had drawn attention to himself at the airport by wearing what O'Driscoll described as "obviously mod clothing". Wilson stated that Hendrix had no drug paraphernalia in his luggage, and Constable W. J. Matheson confirmed that Hendrix had no needle tracks on his arms.

The Hendrix defense team did not dispute that the drugs were found in his bag. They instead developed a strategy intended to demonstrate that he was not aware of its contents. Further, they offered substantiated accounts of how common it was for him to receive gifts from fans, which often included drugs. Hendrix was called as the first witness for the defense; he testified that fans showered gifts on him, including teddy bears, scarves, clothing, and jewelry. He explained that while in Beverly Hills, California, a female fan had given him a vial of what he thought was Bromo-Seltzer—a legal medication—which he put in his bag without knowledge of the illegal substances contained therein. Malone countered: "You are charged with a serious offense, and your evidence is you don't really know how it got there, or who put it there", to which Hendrix responded: "Yes." The prosecutor then held up the aluminum tube in which the hashish was found and asked Hendrix to explain what he thought it was; he replied: "A pea shooter", drawing uproarious laughter from the court. When asked about his drug use, he denied that he had ever used heroin or amphetamines, but admitted to smoking cannabis and hashish. He also admitted that he had used cocaine twice and LSD five times. He testified that his cannabis use had declined over the previous year, stating: "I feel I have outgrown it". (Note: Shapiro and Glebbeek state that Hendrix perjured himself regarding his declaration about quitting cannabis.) Hendrix admitted that he had seen people use heroin, but denied any further knowledge of the drug. He testified that he was given some gifts at a fan club meeting for the Beatles that were intended for the English group; when he opened them he found several joints as well as what appeared to be doses of LSD.

The second witness called by the defense was United Press International (UPI) journalist and Hendrix's friend Sharon Lawrence, who testified that she was with Hendrix in California when, after complaining about feeling ill, an unnamed fan gave him something. When Malone suggested that her memory was suspiciously acute, she explained that her training as a reporter prepared her to notice fine details. Hendrix's manager and producer, Chas Chandler, was called next, and he corroborated the defense's assertion that rock stars, particularly Hendrix, would regularly receive gifts from fans and that those gifts often included drugs. In its closing argument, the defense reiterated that in order to be guilty of possession of narcotics, Hendrix had to have knowledge of the illegal drugs. After a trial that had lasted for three days, the jury deliberated for more than eight hours before returning a not guilty verdict, acquitting Hendrix of both charges. Torontoist's Kevin Plummer wrote: "As the all-male jury announced its acquittal, the courtroom—crowded with young people—erupted into applause." (Note: There were approximately 200 people in the courtroom; most of them were fans of Hendrix.) In remarks to reporters after the verdict was announced, Hendrix commented: "Canada has given me the best Christmas present I ever had", while flashing a peace sign.

== Impact on Hendrix ==
The incident proved stressful for Hendrix, and it weighed heavily on his mind while he awaited trial. His limousine driver and a witness to the arrest, Louis Goldblatt, described him as "genuinely dumbfounded by the whole affair." Tour manager Eric Barrett said that he looked "as if there had been a plane crash". Hendrix biographers Harry Shapiro and Caesar Glebbeek described the incident as "a nightmare which ... plagued" him for seven months. According to Redding, "the bust knocked any positive feelings Jimi was holding onto out of him" and that he was in "agonised suspense" from the arrest until the trial. In 2012, Plummer wrote: "The real possibility of prison hung over Hendrix like a spectre ... a threat to his career and the cause of much brooding and rumination." Journalist Charles Shaar Murray asserted that the incident jeopardized what he described as "Hendrix's increasingly fragile peace of mind".

Drugs ... it's a very bad scene ... especially when you get caught with it, you know.

— Hendrix, during a radio interview, May 18, 1969

Two weeks after the arrest, Hendrix told Lawrence: "Whatever I have done ... getting hooked on heroin is not one of them." He explained that his fear of needles discouraged him from using the drug and that having known "junkies" dependent on heroin convinced him that it was not something he should get involved with. Soon after the story of his arrest became public, he drew a connection between the bust and anti-establishment sentiments: "All of that is the establishment fighting back ... Eventually, they will swallow themselves up, but I don't want them to swallow up too many kids as they go along."

According to Shapiro and Glebbeek, in 1969 there was little confidence in the staying power of rock stars; it was assumed that their careers were going to be short, and industry insiders operated under a "take the money and run" mentality. For this reason, they speculated that had Hendrix been convicted, it would have ended his music career. After the trial, his management announced to the British press that they were planning a farewell tour for the Experience. However, the US tour during which the arrest occurred was their last. (Note: The arrest occurred when the Experience were five weeks into a two-month tour of the US and Canada.) The band played their final concert on June 29, at Mile High Stadium in Denver (less than two months before Hendrix's iconic solo performance at Woodstock). There were no new album releases from them during 1969. (Note: Hendrix later referenced the arrest in lyrics he wrote for "Stepping Stone": "flying can't be trusted – got busted". According to author and musicologist David Moskowitz, the Toronto incident influenced some of the lyrics to "Room Full of Mirrors".) Hendrix's management later stated that concert promoters were apprehensive about booking him until after the matter had been resolved.

== Initial suppression of media coverage ==
According to Cross, "By far the most extraordinary aspect of Jimi Hendrix's drug bust in Toronto on May 3, 1969, was how little press it generated." Despite the fact that Hendrix was one of the biggest stars in North America at the time, and the highest-paid performer in the world, only a couple of Toronto newspapers carried the story. Sharon Lawrence was informed of the incident by a London reporter working for UPI who told her that people were speculating that he had been set up. She commented: "There was nothing about the Hendrix arrest in the Los Angeles papers." However, The Canadian Press news agency ran a story on May 4, which The New York Times carried the following day. Four weeks later, Rolling Stone published a sympathetic article written by rock journalists Ben Fong-Torres and Ritchie Yorke that included speculation that Hendrix had been framed.

In January 1970, Rolling Stone asked Hendrix about having testified that he stopped using cannabis; he laughed and replied: "At least, stop it from growing". When pressed, he answered: "I'm too ... wrecked right now." His management was concerned that the incident might provoke cancellations during the concurrent tour, but the story stayed largely unknown until after the tour had ended. His public relations manager, Michael Goldstein, later revealed that he had bribed a member of the Associated Press with a case of liquor to prevent the story from going out on the wire. Goldstein commented: "I knew that a million dollars was riding on that story not getting on UPI and the AP wire ... By his nature, a press agent shouldn't have to determine someone's future."

== Conspiracy theories ==
Wayne Kramer, a guitarist for MC5, suggested that Hendrix had been set up as part of a wide-scale crackdown on rock musicians: "I don't have any doubt in my mind that the right-wing government forces were behind all of that ... There was an effort, a movement, to stop this threat that rock and roll represented." Hendrix was not the only prominent rock musician who found himself in legal trouble during May 1969. On May 16, the US embassy in London revoked John Lennon's visa in response to his 1968 drug conviction, describing him as "an inadmissible immigrant". That same day, Jefferson Airplane bassist Jack Casady was arrested for possession of marijuana, and on May 28, Mick Jagger and Marianne Faithfull were arrested at their London home for marijuana possession. (Note: Members of the Lovin' Spoonful were arrested in May 1966 for possessing marijuana; the incident marked the first time a 1960s pop music act was busted for possessing illegal drugs. Donovan was arrested in 1966 for LSD possession and the Rolling Stones in 1967. In 1968, George Harrison was arrested for drug possession, and soon afterward Eric Clapton and Stephen Stills were too.)

After the arrest in Toronto, the Federal Bureau of Investigation (FBI) opened a file on Hendrix, which grew to seven pages, including documents related to his previous arrests for stealing cars at the age of 19. Yorke and Fong-Torres wrote, "The populace of Toronto are a very conservative lot, and tend to look with suspicion upon anybody who looks and dresses a little different from themselves. Hendrix looks a lot different." Lawrence commented: "The prevailing political attitude in Canada regarding Hendrix was 'We have to make an example of this fuzzy-haired black weirdo'." Shapiro and Glebbeek asserted their suspicion regarding the presence of the Royal Canadian Mounted Police (RCMP), who did not typically make arrests at the airport. They also speculated that Canadian authorities had anticipated a public spectacle, intentionally searching the Hendrix entourage in plain view of people at the airport. (Note: Toronto customs was known to be difficult on rock stars.)

According to author John Hagen, Toronto's then-mayor, William Dennison, was openly antagonistic to the influx of American hippies, draft resisters, and those who supported them who were coming to Canada in large numbers during the height of the Vietnam War. In his 2001 book, Northern Passage: American Vietnam War Resisters in Canada, Hagen wrote: "The mayors of Canada's largest cities used the (War Measures Act) in a backlash against American war resisters." Dennison stated: "a few hippies and deserters are Toronto's only problem." Mayor Jean Drapeau of Montreal asserted that military resisters were part of a "revolutionary conspiracy." Vancouver's mayor, Tom Campbell, commented: "I don't like draft dodgers and I'll do anything within the law that allows me to get rid of them." While all three men supported use of the War Measures Act to harass war resisters and hippies, Campbell was the most aggressive; he told the Toronto Star: "I believe the law should be used against any revolutionary whether he's a US draft dodger or a hippie." According to Hagen, the RCMP and the FBI cooperated in their effort to harass American war resisters during the late 1960s.

Although several people expressed the opinion that Mike Jeffery had set Hendrix up in an effort to control him and create dependency, Shapiro and Glebbeek dispute this theory based on Jeffery's severe risk of significant financial shortfall had Hendrix been convicted. Jeffery's assistant, Trixie Sullivan, speculated that the drugs had been planted by a fan who became disgruntled after Hendrix refused his sexual advance. Both Mitch Mitchell and Noel Redding later wrote in their autobiographies that the entire Hendrix entourage had been warned about a planned drug bust the day before flying to Toronto; both men also stated that they believed the incident had been set up and that the drugs had been planted in Hendrix's bag. According to author Ritchie Unterberger, although Hendrix "took his fair share of drugs", the commonly accepted view is that he did not use heroin regularly and was not an addict; his drug use was typical of his peers, but not excessive. Mitchell wrote: "Contrary to what some people have said, Jimi was never a junkie – that is he was never addicted to any drug, particularly heroin, which he tried once or twice but didn't like."

== See also ==
- The Lovin' Spoonful's drug bust (1966)
- The Rolling Stones' Redlands bust (1967)
- Waylon Jennings' 1977 arrest (1977)

== Bibliography ==
- Black, Johnny (1999). Jimi Hendrix: The Ultimate Experience. Thunder's Mouth Press. ISBN 978-1-56025-240-5.
- Cross, Charles R. (2005). Room Full of Mirrors: A Biography of Jimi Hendrix. Hyperion. ISBN 978-0-7868-8841-2.
- Hagen, John (2001). Northern Passage: American Vietnam War Resisters in Canada. Harvard University Press. ISBN 978-0-674-00471-9.
- Heatley, Michael (2009). Jimi Hendrix Gear: The Guitars, Amps & Effects that Revolutionized Rock 'n' Roll. Voyageur Press. ISBN 978-0-7603-3639-7.
- Lawrence, Sharon (2005). Jimi Hendrix: The Intimate Story of a Betrayed Musical Legend. Harper. ISBN 978-0-06-056301-1.
- Matijas-Mecca, Christian (2020). Listen to Psychedelic Rock! Exploring a Musical Genre. ABC-CLIO. ISBN 978-1-4408-6198-7.
- McDermott, John (1992). Lewisohn, Mark (ed.). Hendrix: Setting the Record Straight. Grand Central. ISBN 978-0-446-39431-4.
- Mitchell, Mitch; Platt, John (1990). Jimi Hendrix: Inside the Experience. St. Martin's Press. ISBN 978-0-312-10098-8.
- Moskowitz, David (2010). The Words and Music of Jimi Hendrix. Praeger. ISBN 978-0-313-37592-7.
- Murray, Charles Shaar (1989). Crosstown Traffic: Jimi Hendrix and the Rock 'n' Roll Revolution (First US ed.). St. Martin's Press. ISBN 978-0-312-04288-2.
- Plummer, Kevin (May 5, 2012). "Historicist: Stone Free – That time Jimi Hendrix mistook heroin for Bromo Seltzer and got arrested in Toronto". The Torontoist. St. Joseph Communications.
- Redding, Noel; Appleby, Carol (1996). Are You Experienced?. Da Capo Press. ISBN 978-0-306-80681-0.
- Roby, Steven (2002). Black Gold: The Lost Archives of Jimi Hendrix. Billboard Books. ISBN 978-0-8230-7854-7.
- Roby, Steven, ed. (2012) [1969]. "The Queen VS. James Marshall Hendrix". Hendrix on Hendrix: Interviews and Encounters with Jimi Hendrix. Chicago Review Press. ISBN 978-1-61374-322-5.
- Shadwick, Keith (2003). Jimi Hendrix: Musician. Backbeat Books. ISBN 978-0-87930-764-6.
- Shapiro, Harry; Glebbeek, Caesar (1995) [1990]. Jimi Hendrix: Electric Gypsy (New and Improved ed.). St. Martin's Press. ISBN 978-0-312-13062-6.
- Unterberger, Richie (2009). The Rough Guide to Jimi Hendrix. Rough Guides. ISBN 978-1-84836-002-0.
- Whitaker, Matthew C. (2011). Icons of Black America: Breaking Barriers and Crossing Boundaries. Vol. 1. Greenwood. ISBN 978-0-313-37642-9.
- Yorke, Annette (January 21, 1970). "Heroine To The Rescue: Jimi Hendrix Is Innocent". Rolling Stone.
- Yorke, Ritchie; Fong-Torres, Ben (1996) [May 31, 1969]. "Hendrix busted in Toronto". In Potash, Chris (ed.). The Jimi Hendrix Companion. Omnibus. ISBN 978-0-7119-6635-2.
