= Michael Cooper (photographer) =

English photographer

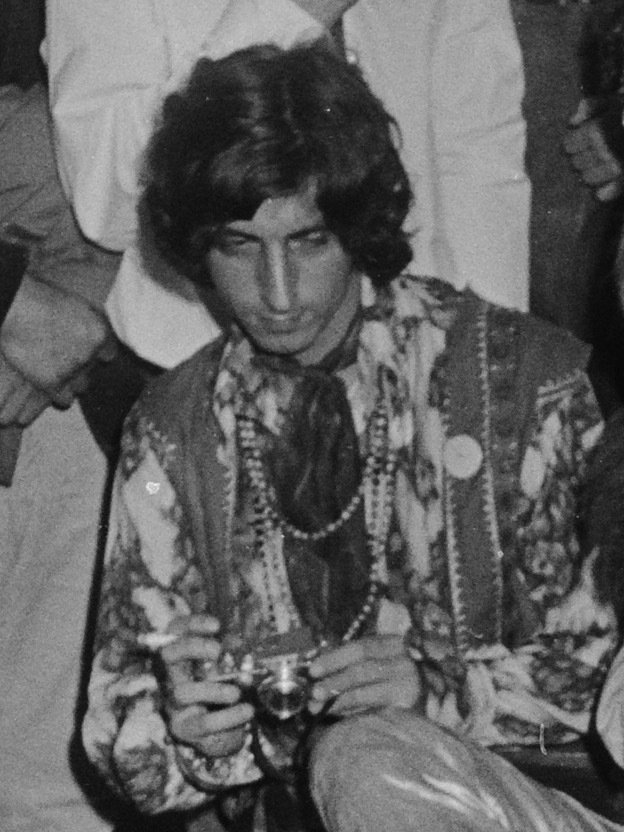
- Cooper in the Concertgebouw on 1 September 1967
- Born: 16 May 1941; Huddersfield, England
- Died: 1973 (aged 31–32)
- Known for: photographs of musicians

Michael Cooper (1941–1973) was a British photographer who is remembered for his photographs of leading rock musicians of the 1960s and early 1970s, most notably the many photos he took of the Rolling Stones from 1963 to 1973.

His best known work is the cover photography for the 1967 LP Sgt. Pepper's Lonely Hearts Club Band by the Beatles. The "Welcome the Rolling Stones, Good Guys" sweatshirt worn by the "little girl" figure on the far right of the photo (actually a cloth figure of Shirley Temple) was provided by Cooper's young son Adam, the product of his marriage to Rose, his muse and model. Cooper also created the cover lenticular for the Rolling Stones 1967 LP Their Satanic Majesties Request.

In 1964 Cooper met London art dealer Robert Fraser, through whom he was introduced to leading figures in music, art and literature, including the Beatles, the Rolling Stones (the rock band he worked most closely with), Marianne Faithfull, Eric Clapton, artists Cecil Beaton, Andy Warhol, Jann Haworth, Stephen Shore, Peter Blake and David Hockney and writers William S. Burroughs, Jean Genet, Terry Southern and Allen Ginsberg.

Cooper was one of those present at Keith Richards' house, "Redlands", in Sussex, when a party being held there was raided by police in the late afternoon of 12 February 1967, leading to drug charges being laid against Richards, Mick Jagger and Robert Fraser.

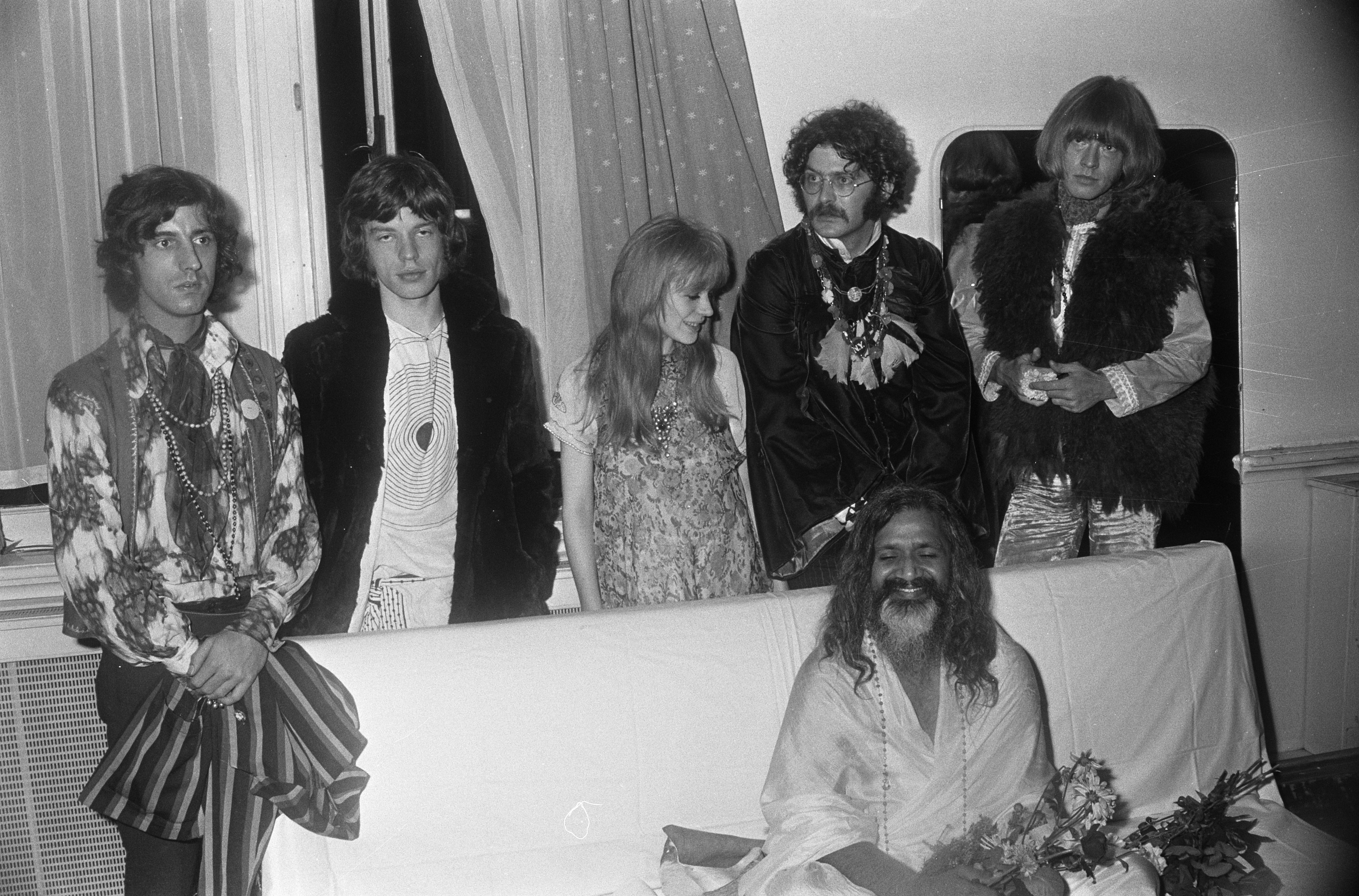
Cooper with Mick Jagger, Marianne Faithfull, Shepard Sherbell, Brian Jones and Maharishi Mahesh Yogi at the Royal Concertgebouw on 1 September 1967

Cooper loaned Terry Southern a copy of Anthony Burgess' A Clockwork Orange in 1967 and they collaborated on the first film adaptation of the novel, which Cooper intended to direct, with Mick Jagger as Alex and the other members of the Rolling Stones as Alex's gang of droogs. The project was eventually shelved and Southern later recommended the book to his friend Stanley Kubrick after Kubrick's planned film on Napoleon was rejected by MGM.

Cooper died by suicide in 1973, caught in a spiral of depression and heroin addiction. He was 31. In a suicide note addressed to his son, Adam, Cooper wrote:

Don't believe the court when they say that I killed myself when the balance of my mind was disturbed. I just live in a disturbed world, and, as the old poem says, "I hear the sound of a different drum." ... I come from what your generation will call the 'Half and Halves'. A generation that made a few changes, but had to experience too many other kinds of changes they had no control over, so some of us were bound to fall by the wayside. I'm one of those.

A lavish book of Cooper's photographs, Blinds and Shutters, edited by Brian Roylance, was published in a limited edition in 1990 by Genesis Publications. A retrospective exhibition of his photography with the same title was held at the Atlas Gallery, London in September–October 2003. Cooper's photographs also feature in the book Michael Cooper: You Are Here – The London Sixties, edited by Robin Muir, and in the book The Early Stones, edited by Perry Richardson.

== Books ==
- Blinds & Shutters: Michael Cooper, Editor: Brian Roylance, Genesis/Hedley, 1990. ISBN 0-904351-37-8
- The Early Stones, Originated and compiled: Perry Richardson, Secker & Warburg, 1993. ISBN 0-436-20137-2
- Michael Cooper: The London Sixties, Editor: Robin Muir, Schirmer/Mosel, 1999. ISBN 978-3888149580
