= Who breaks a butterfly upon a wheel? =

1735 quotation by Alexander Pope

"Who breaks a butterfly upon a wheel?" is a quotation from Alexander Pope's "Epistle to Dr Arbuthnot" of January 1735. It alludes to "breaking on the wheel", a form of torture in which victims had their long bones broken by an iron bar while tied to a Catherine wheel. The quotation is used to suggest someone is "[employing] superabundant effort in the accomplishment of a small matter". The quotation is sometimes misquoted with "on" in place of "upon".

The line appears in a section criticizing the courtier John Hervey, 2nd Baron Hervey, who was close to Queen Caroline and was one of Pope's bitterest enemies. The section also refers to accusations of homosexuality against Hervey. They were originally made in William Pulteney, 1st Earl of Bath's Proper reply to a late scurrilous libel of 1731, which had led to Hervey challenging Pulteney to a duel. Hervey's decade-long clandestine affair with Stephen Fox would eventually contribute to his downfall. Despite Pope's claims, Hervey should not be considered homosexual, as he was known to be bisexual.

== Pope's satire ==
The line "Who breaks a butterfly upon a wheel?" forms line 308 of the "Epistle to Dr Arbuthnot" in which Alexander Pope responded to his physician's word of caution about making satirical attacks on powerful people by sending him a selection of such attacks. It appears in a section on the courtier John Hervey, 2nd Baron Hervey, who was close to Queen Caroline and was one of Pope's bitterest enemies. The section opens as follows:

Let Sporus tremble –"What? that thing of silk,
Sporus, that mere white curd of ass's milk?
Satire or sense, alas! can Sporus feel?
Who breaks a butterfly upon a wheel?
Yet let me flap this bug with gilded wings,
This painted child of dirt that stinks and stings;
Whose buzz the witty and the fair annoys,
Yet wit ne'er tastes, and beauty ne'er enjoys,

"Sporus", a male slave favoured by Emperor Nero, was, according to Suetonius, castrated by the emperor, and subsequently married. Pope here refers to accusations made in Pulteney's Proper reply to a late scurrilous libel of 1731 which led to Hervey challenging Pulteney to a duel. Hervey's decade-long clandestine affair with Stephen Fox would eventually contribute to his downfall. As first published the verse referred to Paris, but was changed to Sporus when republished a few months later.

"What? that thing of silk" uses a metaphor of a silkworm spinning that Pope had already used in The Dunciad to refer to bad poets. "Ass's milk" was at that time a common tonic, and was part of a diet adopted by Hervey. "This painted child" comments on make-up such as rouge used by the handsome Hervey.

Another graphic instance of the usage can be found in An Introduction to Harmony by William Shield (1800), wherein he writes: "Having brought this Introduction to Harmony before that awful Tribunal, the Public, without first submitting it to the inspection of a judicious friend, I shall doubtless merit severe correction from the Critic; but as my attempt has been rather to write a useful Book, than a learned Work, I trust that he will not break a Butterfly upon the wheel for not being able to soar with the wings of an Eagle."

== Modern use ==
William Rees-Mogg, as editor of The Times, used the "on a wheel" version of the quotation as the heading (set in capital letters) for an editorial on 1 July 1967 about the "Redlands" court case, which had resulted in prison sentences for Rolling Stones members Keith Richards and Mick Jagger.

The philosopher Mary Midgley used a variation on the phrase in an article in the journal Philosophy written to counter a review praising The Selfish Gene by Richard Dawkins, where she said that she had "not attended to Dawkins, thinking it unnecessary to break a butterfly upon a wheel."

British rock band The Mission released a single entitled "Butterfly on a Wheel" in 1990, and "Break a Butterfly on a Wheel" is the penultimate track on Similarities, a compilation album by Scottish rock trio Biffy Clyro. The phrase has been used in the lyrics of songs including "Soul Asylum" by The Cult (from the 1989 album Sonic Temple), "Paradise" by Coldplay, and "Falling Down" by Oasis.

== Sources ==
- Moore, Lucy, Amphibious Thing: The Life of Lord Hervey (pub. Viking, 2000)
