= David Stafford-Clark =

English psychiatrist and author

David Stafford-Clark (17 April 1916 – 1999) was a British psychiatrist and author. He was educated at Felsted and Institute of Psychiatry, University of London (now part of King's College London).

== War service ==
Stafford-Clark did war service in charge of Waterbeach hospital, Cambridgeshire at the home of RAF Bomber Command. He was mentioned in dispatches twice as a result of taking part in raids. He worked hard to change the prevalent public opinion that airmen were naturally suave, fearless men; he portrayed them as war-battered men pushed beyond the limits of human exhaustion.

== Career ==
In 1954 he was appointed director and head of psychological medicine at the York Clinic, Guy's Hospital, with a consultancy at the Bethlem Royal and Institute of Psychiatry, Maudsley Hospital until ill-health forced his retirement in 1974.

As a forensic psychiatrist, he testified for the defence in the much-publicized murder trial of Guenther Podola, who sought to evade his trial on the grounds of amnesia, and later in the case of the banned novel Lady Chatterley's Lover by D. H. Lawrence.

He gave a number of lectures such as the Robert Waley Cohen series, on 'Psychology of Prejudice; Christians & Jews' in 1960 and St Andrews University's twelve Gifford lectures in 1976.

== Books ==
His bestselling book Psychiatry To-day (1951) was followed by numerous other titles including Psychology for Students (1964) which had seven reprints; these two named volumes are widely regarded as standard texts for all University psychology courses. He also wrote What Freud really said (1965), another best-seller.

One of his sons, Max Stafford-Clark, is a prominent theatre director and another, Nigel Stafford-Clark, is a triple BAFTA winner.
