= Apocalyptic Riders =

1984 painting by Nabil Kanso

- Year: 1984

Apocalyptic Riders is a diptych executed in 1984 and is part of a series begun in 1980 by Nabil Kanso.

== Description ==
The diptych is oil on 2-piece canvas measuring 2.75 X 4.50 meters (9 X 15 feet). It depicts two horsemen or as one writer describes "Two wild Knights riding toward each other in an explosion swarming the canvas. They represent the Apocalypse Riders who are also the riders of the war in Lebanon, the artist’s native country."

== See also ==
- Apocalyptic Rider
- Apocalypse Series
- 1984 in art
