= The Split of Life =

Series of paintings by Nabil Kanso

Warring Wings
- Artist: Nabil Kanso
- Year: 1984
- Medium: oil on canvas
- Dimensions: 3.65 m × 10.30 m (144 in × 406 in)

The Split of Life is a series of over 80 mural size oil paintings by Nabil Kanso. The paintings span a period from 1974 to 1994, and deal with contemporary and historical issues of war and violence.

== Development and description ==
The subject of war in Kanso’s work began during 1972–1974 in New York when he did a series of paintings and drawings on the Vietnam War. After a brief pause, he started in 1975 the Lebanon war series evoked by the civil war that broke out in his native land. The intersection of the two series reflecting similarity in composition, scale, style and theme provided the framework for a larger series whose underlying theme formed the basis of the Split of Life series in encompassing several other series dealing with war.

The Split of Life series delineates two periods: 1974–1985 and 1986–1994. The works of the first period are characterized by the use of warm colors dominated by red, orange, yellow and black, and the depiction of compositions in which masses of figures occupy the entire surface plane. Among the series in the period are the Vietnam, Lebanon, One-Minute on (Hiroshima and Nagasaki) and Time Suspended in Space on (South Africa) series. The works of the 1986–94 period depict compositions that divide the canvas in two or more sections depicting figures painted in dark blue and black within an enclosure of red and orange surrounded by a white space. Everywhere in the painting there is the dynamics of transformation, rather than static forms of distribution and knowledge. Among the series in this period are the Cluster Matter, Glory and Cruelty, and Living Memory (Auschwitz) series. It is suggested that most of the Split of Life paintings are recessive in the upper center, and somewhat bilaterally symmetrical. This division is often in the form of a face placed against a V form. The violence seems to deploy itself towards that opening so that the center is dominated by a mother of war, a kali-figure.

== Analysis and interpretations ==
In examining the works in the Split of Life series, some studies point to compositional and thematic aspects in conjunction with a set of distinctive concepts, in particular, the human subject, the Gods, the luminous sky, and the concealing self-concealing earth.

The human figures appear as the flesh of humanity, always compelled by the law of regeneration, offering itself willingly to the torments of domination and submission. Human suffering and torment seem to have always existed. They bear the pain and continue to remain in this dreadful state dictated by a delinquent social reality. In the split of Life, they exist in a new and different reality created by the artist imagination on big canvases in which they make their case as condemned beings. Their presence disturbs and troubles us. We find ourselves immersed in their world whose reality becomes our own reality.

The Gods appear immortal but not eternal; each Holy Family presides only over one epoch in the history of men with the Gods. The powers (beyond Good and Evil) into which “Necessity is analyzed have no history; they crush humanity within the eternal circle of helpless reflection and unconscious desire.”

The picture surface occludes the sky, the empty space of the horizon that makes possible light, darkness, and their relations, the horizon as a boundary between sky and earth. the composition covers that space and all its cognitive illusions The explosions of wars wreaking destruction and devastation inflamed and obfuscated the blue sky with dark forms erupting from earth burning fires. The violent scenes disturbs the chromatic gamut of chiaroscuro, light and shadow through which the victims emerge from the canvases with a common sigh of an open injury sustained by social reality. The pictorial layout extends to the edges of the canvases as light or dark with no space. Light emanates from the figures and use the, so light, therefore, is ultimately a force Light, space, sky closely relate to forms of redemption through irony, acceptance of mortality, the story of people, light against darkness.

The earth absorbs the forces that conceal, and conceal themselves in, everything that comes to light. The earth cannot appear by itself; it needs of painting, of the choice of the painter, even as it consumes them. Kanso explores the terror that surrounds the act of choice of self-choice, of painting. The paintings bring out the earthly nightmares that have concealed the serenity of paradise and peace, and transmit a new calling for an awakening.

In discussing artistic tendencies, it is remarked that Kanso breaks with the pictorial traditions of both the East and the West. He gives us instead the Middle, "the chasm of necessity that yawns at the heart of human contingency and universal contingency."

The gap in the middle provided the ground for a total redefinition of painting in a style in which Kanso departed from the pictorial conventions of both the East and West. He presents a view of the world and its forms in terms of its multiplicity and interrelatedness. A world in which the political boundaries are not arbitrarily drawn by the superpowers. In the words of Edward Said "The more one is able to leave one’s cultural home the more one is able to judge it, and the whole world as well, with the spiritual detachment and generosity necessary for true vision. The more easily too, does one assess oneself and alien cultures with the same combination of intimacy and distance."

The question of cultural multiplicity as opposed to cultural dislocation comes into play. Orientalism is a form of cultural dislocation because it imposed a western culture on the “orient” in such a way that what is reflected back by the Orient is not the Oriental culture but instead a colonized culture. Cultural multiplicity on the other hand is maintaining one’s own cultural identity and presenting it with other cultures. It is noted that “Nabil Kanso is the first Middle Eastern artist to surface outside, if not against the framework of colonialism.” He presents a view of the world through the boundary situations of death, love, suffering, and guilt. The organization of these boundary situation, a critic points out, constitutes his poetics, which is "predicated on a profound human kingship with the West and an amazed expectant detachment from it. From this circle he derives his extraordinary power of expression."

== Exhibitions ==
Between 1983 and 1993, a wide range of paintings from various phases of The Split of Life series were exhibited a various art centers in Argentina BrazilMexico, Panama, Korea,Kuwait, Sweden, Switzerland and Venezuela, The exhibitions were the subject of articles, essays, poems, conferences, and peace projects. In Venezuela, installations were featured as part of the Second Ibero-American Symposium held in Caracas in 1987, the International Encounter for Peace in Mérida in 1988. The paintings displayed in different exhibitions were viewed as reflecting a sense of "over-all-ness, of one painting running into another." It is remarked that the magnitude of the paintings place the viewer in the midst of a violent cage. Their synchrony and diachronic cross a still point in which the show is no longer a total of several pieces, but only one painting. Some critics point to a sense of entrapment in which standing in the central space surrounded by Kanso’s 12-foot-high paintings is as close as you get to being in the middle of a fire. "The painted holocaust surrounding us," a reviewer wrote "entrapped us in cage of feeling". "In encountering these paintings", a critic remarked, "it would be impossible to escape. The scenes draw the viewer in witnessing the violent events." “We find ourselves immersed in this violent totality, terrible and incisive, we are trapped." The horrors appear to burst out of the canvases bringing the viewer face to face with scenes reflecting a continuum of war and violence occurring in our time and space.

== 1984-85 series ==
In 1985, Kanso exhibited a series of seven paintings that covered the walls of the gallery at Nexus Contemporary Art Center reflecting in the opinion of one reviewer “a monumental display of neo-expressionist horrors of war.” "The horrors of war in Lebanon" an art critic wrote "have fueled the fires that burn in these very effective paintings," “In the face of horror,” remarked one critic, “there are only two courses: to circumscribe, create a bar, an absolute demarcation, to be “at one” with the confluence and to refuse to overcome it- or to obsess to the point of no return, to create a canvas the size and shape of the original, a one-to-one mapping of the real upon itself, which uses the body of the artist “in a transitive sense” across it. And that is what is occurring in these paintings.” A reviewer thought of the expressions as “a tapestry of souls, struggling, reaching for one another… painted jazz rhythms of naked spirits climbing an interminable Jacob’s ladder in a metaphorical conflagration which repulses and sucks us all in.

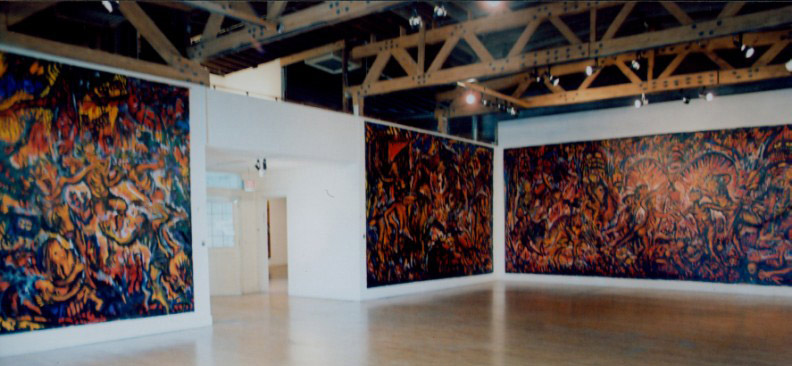
Partial view of the Split of Life installation, 1985

In examining the series of seven paintings executed in 1984-85, art critics point to a variety of themes, in particular, power, death, and sexuality, and the poetics, which organize the themes within the paintings. The interrelatedness of these themes and the composed symbols associated with them provide a framework that lend crucial meaning to the paintings. Doorways, empty centers, and ladders exist in all these paintings. In critical opinion, they carry with them a message of a change or a shift in the modes of power from a system, which controls through repression and reduction, connected to the law of the sovereign, to a positive system which aims to promote and execute life and whose connection is to the social body.

- Warring Wings, 12 X 34 feet (3.65 X 10.50 meters), oil on canvas, 1984 Four central warriors figures pair in a face to face fight wielding two large curved blades shaped like sickle or scythe with sharp arrows pointing in multiple directions. Between then, protrude an enigmatic face with wide-open mouth and teeth. The intersection of the two blades forms two large entwined wings that divide the scene in two sections related to the struggle and filled with constant movement and tension heightening the atmosphere of brutality, oppression, suffering, and violence. “In this painting” an art critic writes, “Kanso explores the multiplicity of power and makes aware of its mobile relations by creating a center with no central figure. Four figures replace the notion of a center of power with the multiplicity of mobile relations. In essence “power is exercised from innumerable points, in the interplay of non-egalitarian and mobile relations.”. The figures around the center appear as “hegemonic symbols” of the mobile relations, where there is power there is resistance” a term developed as a result of American Orientalism. There are four horsemen evenly distributed in front four towers with masklike faces. Some critics contend that these riders represent their accumulated power and wealth i.e. corporations and corporate heads. A spectral figure riding a horse confronts a crucified bearded figure who is being speared at the chest. He seems to be pulling forcefully in a look of rage. This figure alludes to the crucified Christ and symbolizes the vanishing of consensus at the center of power. The heads rising from the forefront symbolize the inconstancies, discontinuities, and elusiveness of power without consensus, which these heads shelter and facilitate through silence and secrecy.
- The Door, 12 X 18 feet, (3.65 X 5.50 meters), oil on canvas, 1985 A dominant figure mounted on a horse in the upper center of the painting seems to oversee the event symbolize authority and power. He rides near a figure standing in front of an open door of flaming hearth. He gestures with outflanked embraced arms and looks toward three headless figures walking towards him. A figure clutching a book seems to watch their pace while awaits their arrival. In critical opinion the headless figures are symbols of the conjunction of legalism and death. The figure in the doorway and the one with a book symbolize the intermediaries who carries out the law by obeying and upholding power.
- Between the Walls, 12 X 10 feet, 3,65 X 3 meters, oil on canvas, 1985 The entire canvas is dripping with blood symbolic of power that spoke through blood: the honor of war, the fear of famine, the triumph of death, the sovereign with his sword, a reality with a symbolic function.” Blood drips over a constructed prison where six terrified weeping children lean at the lower stones of the wall stretching out their hands with pleading gesture. Across the upper part are six bleeding doves trying to fly above the walls that enclose them. A brightly lit wire-barbed doorway with black birds trying to fly in and out fills the center. A ladder twists up the left side of the painting camouflaging the sixth child and connecting it to the sixth bird. Some critics contends that the composition portrays humanity surrounded by towers of powers (walls) and its soul is arrested in flight, despair emanates from the doorway, and everything seems submerged in sanguinity (the law).”
- Naked Ghosts, 12 X 18 feet (3.65 X 5.50 meters), oil on canvas, 1984 A gigantic bird with menacing look swoops down over a turbulent scene expanding with several divisions of varying complexities, tensions, and counter tensions. Figures with outstretched arms in gestures of outrage and rescue emerge from the two upper sides of the painting and dive diagonally toward a scene of abduction, rape, torture, or death. An aggressive and threatening looking tiger roars at two fighting figures with long spear. It is noted that the composition deals with the impotence of the repressive system in relation to the individual symbolized by a figure delineated by man’s turning back on himself: in evidence is an act of cannibalism taking place in the upper right corner of the painting. The relations of death and the mobile forces of power are manifest in forms of reduction and repression symbolized in executions and punishments.
- Masters Rhythm, 12 X 18 feet (3.65 X 5.50 meters), oil on canvas, 1984 A figure plays piano next to a sitting donkey. On the grand piano, a man lying on his back with his arms stretched around a woman on top of him. She leans backward in an ecstatic trance toward a male figure dancing frantically. The pianist symbolizes authority issuing his decrees from a piano. The light from the doorway emanates from the center of a circle of bleeding brains. The heads that flanked the foregrounds in the Door and Warring Wings paintings have metamorphosed from heads with no bodies to bodies with no brains. They dance hysterically on the right side of the canvas unable to unite with their floating brains, as the political processes have rendered them helpless, a role played by the figure of maestro conducting the dancing figures.
- Transgression, 12 X 22 feet ( 3.65 X 6.75 meters), oil on canvas, 1984 The composition divides the scene in three triangular parts dominated by a large central section extending its edges to the upper corners of the canvas. At the center top, two winding ladders entwine in V-shape form alongside two large birds of prey swooping over a scene intensified by divisions, shapes, and symmetry of spatial areas animated by struggling figures in various acts and encounters. According to critical analysis, this painting presents the human body as the most telling vehicle to a new sense of soul, and its transformation from the metaphysical to the communicative level. Kanso focuses on the process of transforming sexual desire into discourse and brings into focus the place of sex within techniques of communication and absence of communication as made explicit in psychoanalysis. The only clothed woman in the paintings is placed in the upper right of the center. She alludes to the Madonna reflecting connotations such as asceticism, confession, and mysticism, all concepts closely related to psychoanalysis as a human technique. Her clothing intensifies the sensuality of the nude figures that surround her. On the left side, the figures of a mother, father, and child are symbols of secular sexuality. Prominently positioned in the foreground is the backside of male figure with wing-shape raised arms and almost invisible bent down head is seen thrusting toward forked legs at the center surrounded by female figures. It is noted by some critics that sensuality and eroticism of the women in the painting reflect aspects that partake of Kali and her femininity embodying the erotic and the presence of the body as revolutionary. Hence the eroticism of these bodies and their revolutionary aspect.
- Falling Shades, 12 X 10 feet (3.65 X 3 meters), oil on canvas, 1985 The composition shows a ladder moving from the center of the light toward the frontal plane and recedes up through a doorway where the lower half of a body is seen disappearing out. The figure appears upside down diving diagonally from the upper left corner toward the center of the picture but does not enter the lighted center. It is suggested by some writers that this figure has reached a new terminal point, one that, considers death not in terms of the individual body and soul, but in terms of a species, which is the Split of Life.” It is remarked by some critics that “man has arrived at a position in the world where he has the power to annihilate himself through his technology and if he fails at this he is faced with annihilation through disease.” In this painting Kanso presented us with a mass of bodies across the bottom looking up –these are not the bodies which reflect murderous splendor of the sovereign, but rather a species considering its fate. How the artist presents the human body is the most telling vehicle to a new sense of soul, and its transformation from the metaphysical to the communicative level.

== See also ==
- Lebanon
- The Vortices of Wrath (Lebanon 1977)
- Vietnam
