= 1980 in art =

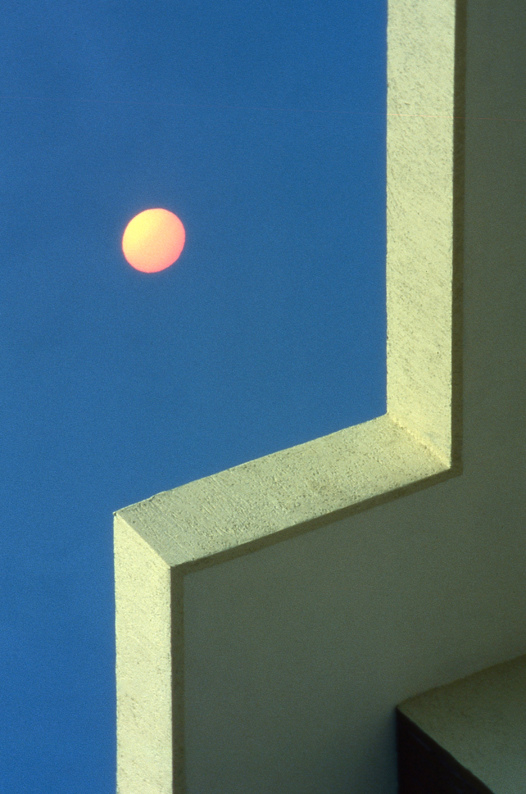
Augusto De Luca

Events from the year 1980 in art.

== Events ==
- January 1 – Gary Larson's single-panel comic The Far Side debuts in the San Francisco Chronicle.
- February 7 – Pink Floyd's The Wall Tour opens at the Los Angeles Memorial Sports Arena.
- May 22–September 16 – Pablo Picasso Retrospective exhibition at the Museum of Modern Art in New York City, the largest and most complete Picasso exhibition ever held in the United States.
- December 8 – Annie Leibovitz photographs John Lennon with Yoko Ono in New York for the cover of Rolling Stone magazine five hours before his murder.
- Robert Hughes presents a series (with accompanying book), The Shock of the New, for BBC Television in the United Kingdom on "art and the century of change".
- Benedikt Taschen opens a comic book store in Cologne which will evolve into the art book publisher Taschen.

== Exhibitions ==
- February 17 until April 6 - "Afro-American Abstraction" (curated by April Kingsley at MoMA PS1 in New York City.

== Works ==
- Basil Blackshaw – Green Landscape
- Arbit Blatas – The Monument of the Holocaust (reliefs, first edition)
- Alan Chung Hung – Gate to the Northwest Passage (sculpture, Vancouver, British Columbia)
- David Inshaw – The River Bank (Ophelia)
- Keith Jellum – Mimir (sculpture, Portland, Oregon)
- Nabil Kanso
  - Apocalyptic Rider
  - Time Suspended in Space (South Africa)
- Peter Kennard – Haywain with Cruise Missiles
- Georgia O'Keeffe – Llama in the Desert
- Bryan Organ – Harold Macmillan, 1st Earl of Stockton
- Howard Post – Moving Cattle
- George Segal – Gay Liberation (sculpture)

== Awards ==
- John Moores Painting Prize - Michael Moon for "Box-room"

== Deaths ==
=== January to June ===
- January 9 – Joy Adamson, Austria-Kenyan painter and conservationist (b. 1910)
- January 18 – Cecil Beaton, English photographer and stage and costume designer (b. 1904)
- January 20 – William Roberts, painter (b. 1904)
- January 26 – Dolly Rudeman, Dutch graphic designer (b. 1902)
- February 4 – Stojan Aralica, Serbian Impressionist painter and academic (b. 1883)
- February 6 – Albert Kotin, Russian-born American Abstract Expressionist artist (b. 1907)
- February 17 – Graham Sutherland, English artist (b. 1903)
- February 22 – Oskar Kokoschka, Austrian artist, poet and playwright (b. 1886)
- March 5 – John Skeaping, English sculptor and equine painter (b. 1901)
- March 18 – Tamara de Lempicka, Polish Art Deco painter (b. 1898)
- April 21
  - Ľudovít Fulla, Slovak painter, graphic artist, illustrator, stage designer and art teacher (b. 1902)
  - Sohrab Sepehri, Persian poet and a painter (b. 1928)
- May 15 – Len Lye, New Zealand-born American kinetic sculptor and filmmaker (b. 1901)
- May 16 – Izis Bidermanas, Lithuanian-born photographer (b. 1911)
- June 7 – Philip Guston, Canadian-born American Abstract Expressionist painter and printmaker (b. 1913)
- June 23 – Clyfford Still, American Abstract Expressionist painter (b. 1904)

=== July to December ===
- July 16 – Robert Brackman, Ukrainian-born American painter and art teacher (b. 1898)
- August 26 – Tex Avery, American animator, cartoonist, and director (b. 1908).
- September 14 – Maxwell Bates, Canadian architect and expressionist painter (b. 1906).
- November 22 – Norah McGuinness, Irish painter and illustrator (b. 1901).
- December 26 – Tony Smith, American sculptor, visual artist and theorist on art (b. 1912).
- December 30 – Patrick Hennessy, Irish painter (b. 1915).

=== Undated ===
- Andrée Bosquet, Belgian painter (born 1900)
- Cicely Hey, English-born artist and model (born 1896)

== See also ==
- 1980 in fine arts of the Soviet Union
