= Jazza =

Jazza may refer to:

- Jazza Dickens, British professional boxer
- Jazza (YouTuber), Josiah Brooks, Australian YouTuber artist
- Big Jazza McClone, a character referred to in the BBC 1987 television serial Tutti Frutti

== See also ==
- JAZA, Japanese Association of Zoos and Aquariums
- JASA (disambiguation)
- Jazz (disambiguation)
- Jazzah, album by Jan Akkerman
