= The Floating Shadows (triptych) =

1986 painting by Nabil Kanso

Floating shadows, triptych, oil on canvas, 2.75 X 7.60 meters (9 X 25 feet), 1986

The Floating Shadows is a triptych made by Nabil Kanso in 1986 on the brutality and suffering inflicted during the Lebanese Civil War. The painting is oil on canvas and measures 2.75 x 7.60 meters (9 X 25 feet). It forms part of the Cluster Paintings series that Kanso began in 1986 and marks the transition to a new approach in his compositional framework. The pictorial layout divides the canvas space into various sections reflecting a cluster of interlinked planes depicting floating figures of predominantly dark-blue set against deep orange ground and demarcated by white grayish areas.

== See also ==
- America 500 Years
- Lebanon (painting)
