= Mimir (sculpture) =

Sculpture in Portland, Oregon, U.S.

- The sculpture in 2021
- Artist: Keith Jellum
- Year: 1980
- Type: Sculpture
- Medium: Bronze; concrete
- Subject: Mímir
- Dimensions: 61 cm × 38 cm × 33 cm (24 in × 15 in × 13 in)
- Condition: "Treatment needed" (1993)
- Location: Portland, Oregon, United States; 45°32′08″N 122°42′24″W
- Owner: City of Portland and Multnomah County Public Art Collection courtesy of the Regional Arts & Culture Council

Mimir is an outdoor bronze and concrete sculpture by Keith Jellum, installed in northwest Portland, Oregon, United States. The 1980 sculpture was commissioned by the Portland Development Commission and Tom Walsh of Tom Walsh Construction, and is part of the City of Portland and Multnomah County Public Art Collection courtesy of the Regional Arts & Culture Council.

== Description and history ==
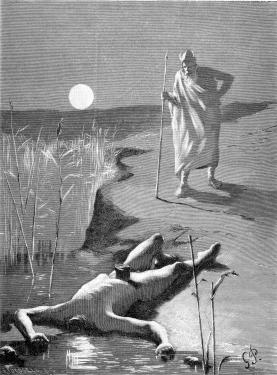
The sculpture is based on Mímir of Norse mythology. Pictured is a 19th-century depiction of Odin discovering Mímir's beheaded body.

Mimir is an 8-foot (2.4 m) bronze and concrete sculpture designed by Portland artist Keith Jellum, whose other works in the city include Electronic Poet (1984) and Transcendence, a fish sculpture above Southpark Seafood at Southwest Salmon Street and Ninth Avenue. Mimir is based on the figure of the same name in Norse mythology, renowned for his knowledge and wisdom, and who is beheaded during the Æsir–Vanir War. Afterward, the god Odin carries around Mímir's head, which serves as an oracle and recites secret knowledge and counsel to him. Jennifer Anderson of the Portland Tribune said the sculpture is a "combination of Norse mythology, gibberish, fish and space creature". In 2007, Jellum recalled of its origin: "I'm not sure where [the image] came from. It's just at the time I was doing a whole lot of drawings, and it just popped out and sort of appealed to me. It's part fish, part space creature."

Mimir was installed at Northwest 27th Avenue between Northwest Upshur and Thurman Streets in 1980, after being commissioned by the Portland Development Commission and Tom Walsh of Tom Walsh Construction. The abstract sculpture measures approximately 24 inches (61 cm) x 15 inches (38 cm) x 13 inches (33 cm), which rests on a concrete and stone base that measures 7 feet (2.1 m) x 30 inches (76 cm) x 30 inches (76 cm). The Smithsonian Institution described the work as follows: "Decorative obelisk with a mask mounted at the top. The mask has a cone-like nose and tusks. It wears a layered breastplate with shoulder pads." The base includes a plaque with no legible text. Anderson described the plaque as "a few lines of illegible chicken scratch as if it's an alien artifact that landed in the middle of the city." Jellum described the hieroglyphic inscription as a "play upon plaques", explaining: "You see all these plaques around and they give all this 'important' information. I thought it was just irrelevant to the piece. I like the idea of putting something up there that didn't have any information on it."

The sculpture's condition was deemed "treatment needed" by Smithsonian's "Save Outdoor Sculpture!" program in October 1993. It is part of the City of Portland and Multnomah County Public Art Collection courtesy of the Regional Arts & Culture Council.

== Reception ==
Anderson of the Portland Tribune contributor called the sculpture a "curiosity" and "whimsical", and said the plaque adds to its mystique.

== See also ==
- 1980 in art
- Norse mythology in popular culture
- Thor (sculpture) by Melvin Schuler (1977), a sculpture in Portland depicting the Norse god Thor
