= Cultural references to Othello =

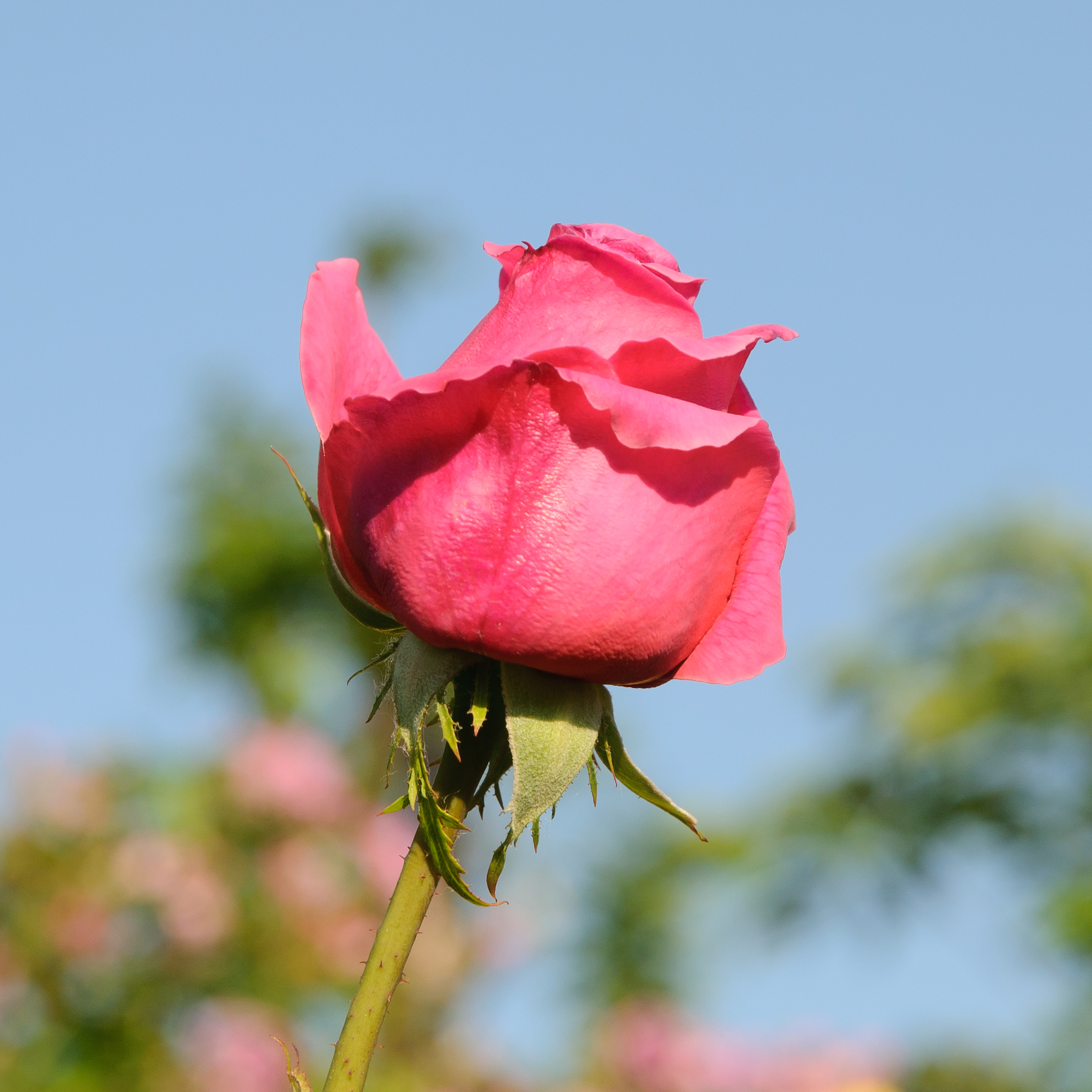
Rosa 'Othello' in the Volksgarten

In addition to its appearance in the theatre, the character of Othello from the tragic play by William Shakespeare has appeared in many examples in art and culture since being authored by Shakespeare in the early 16th century.

== In the visual arts ==
The literary character of Othello and the plot of the play by Shakespeare has been a recurrent theme in painting for several centuries. Selected examples include The Plot depicting Othello and Iago, which was painted in oil by Solomon Alexander Hart in 1855. He also painted a watercolour version, held at the Victoria & Albert Museum in London. Othello was a series of 60 paintings executed in 1985 by Nabil Kanso. It was published in 1996 by NEV Editions.

In 2018, the African American conceptual artist Fred Wilson created the work I saw Othello's visage in his mind in Murano glass and wood, inspired by a line of Desdemona's in Act One of the tragedy.

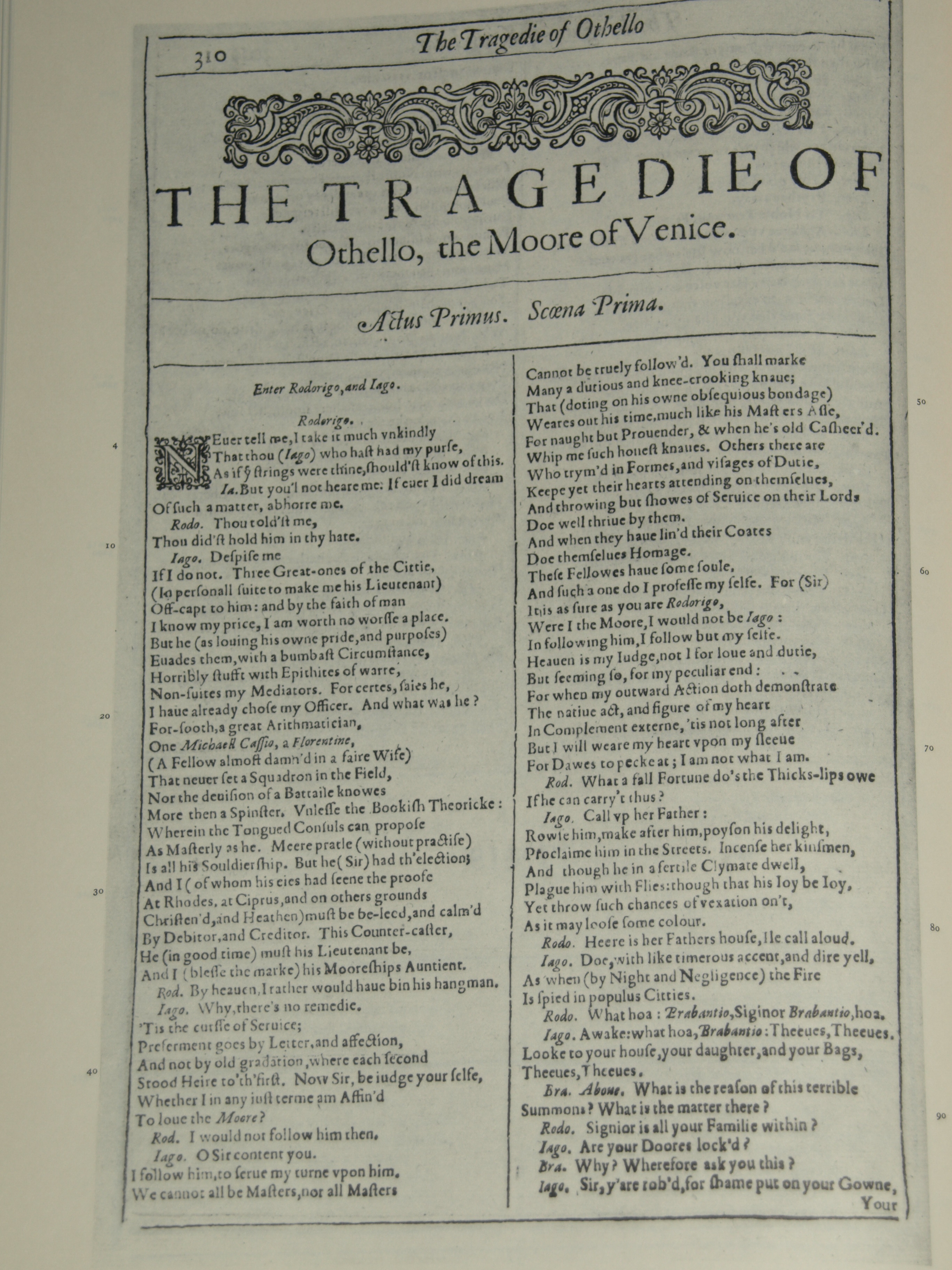
First Folio (1623) title page facsimile

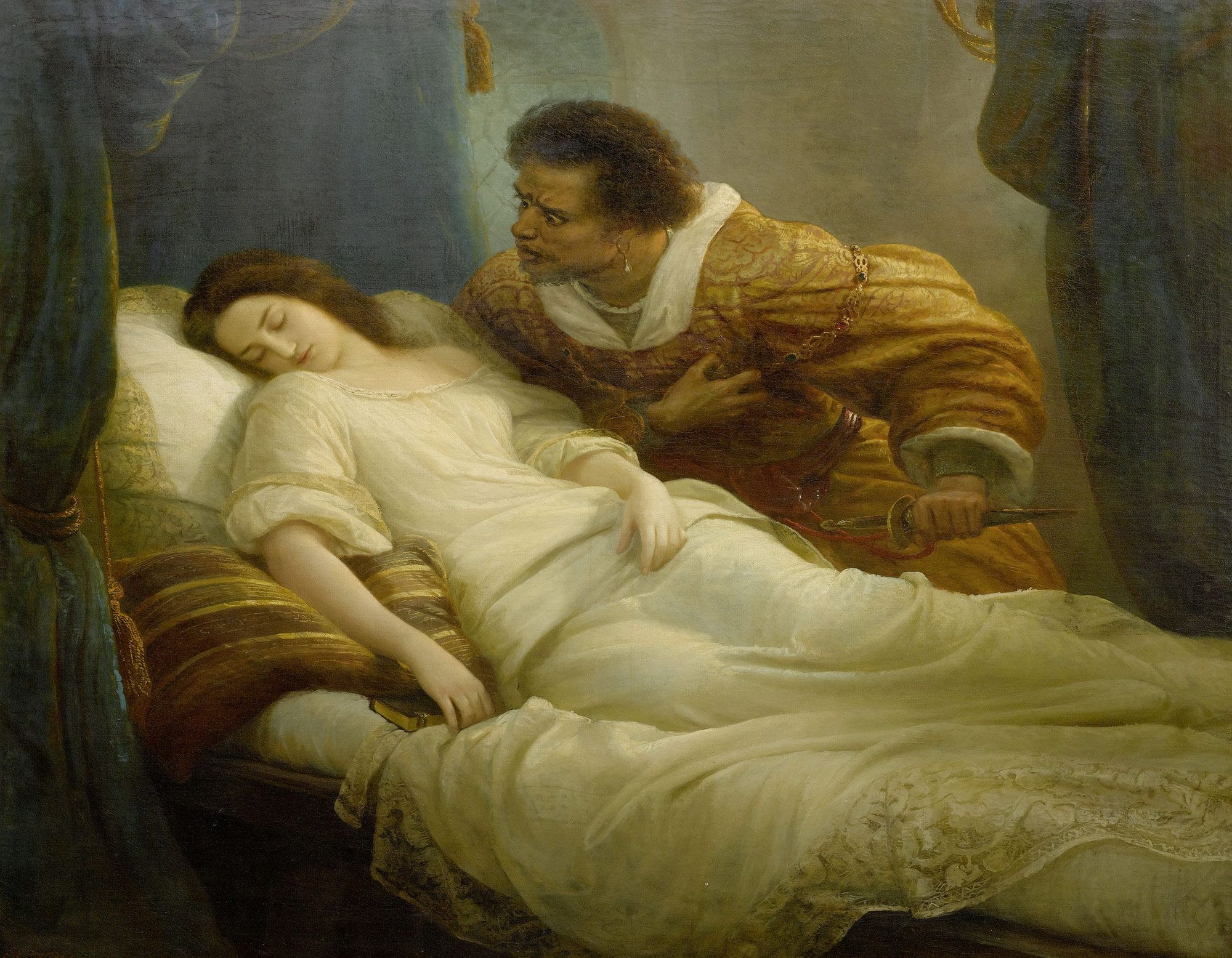
Othello with Desdemona in bed asleep by Christian Köhler (1859)

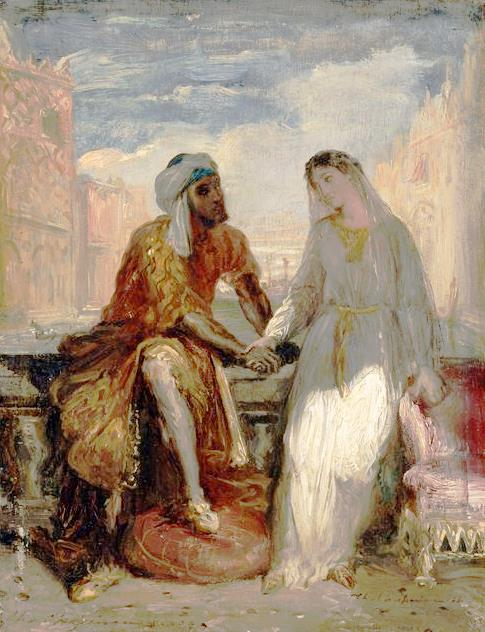
Othello and Desdemona in Venice by Théodore Chassériau (1850)

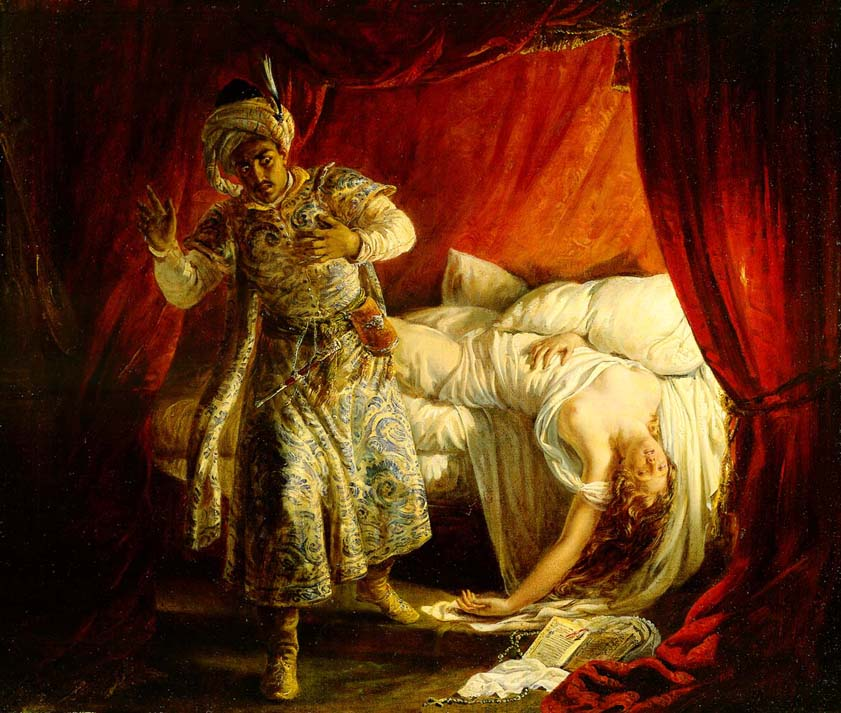
Othello and Desdemona by Alexandre-Marie Colin, 1829

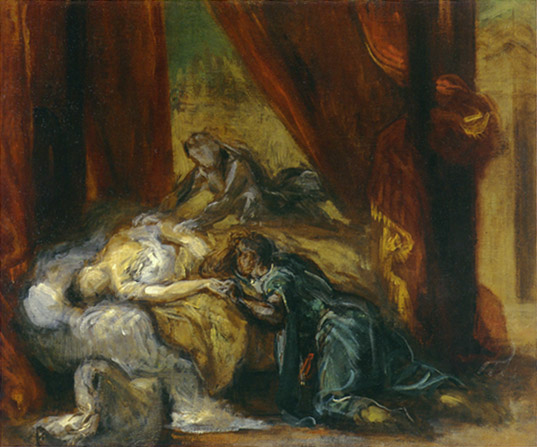
The Death of Desdemona by Eugène Delacroix

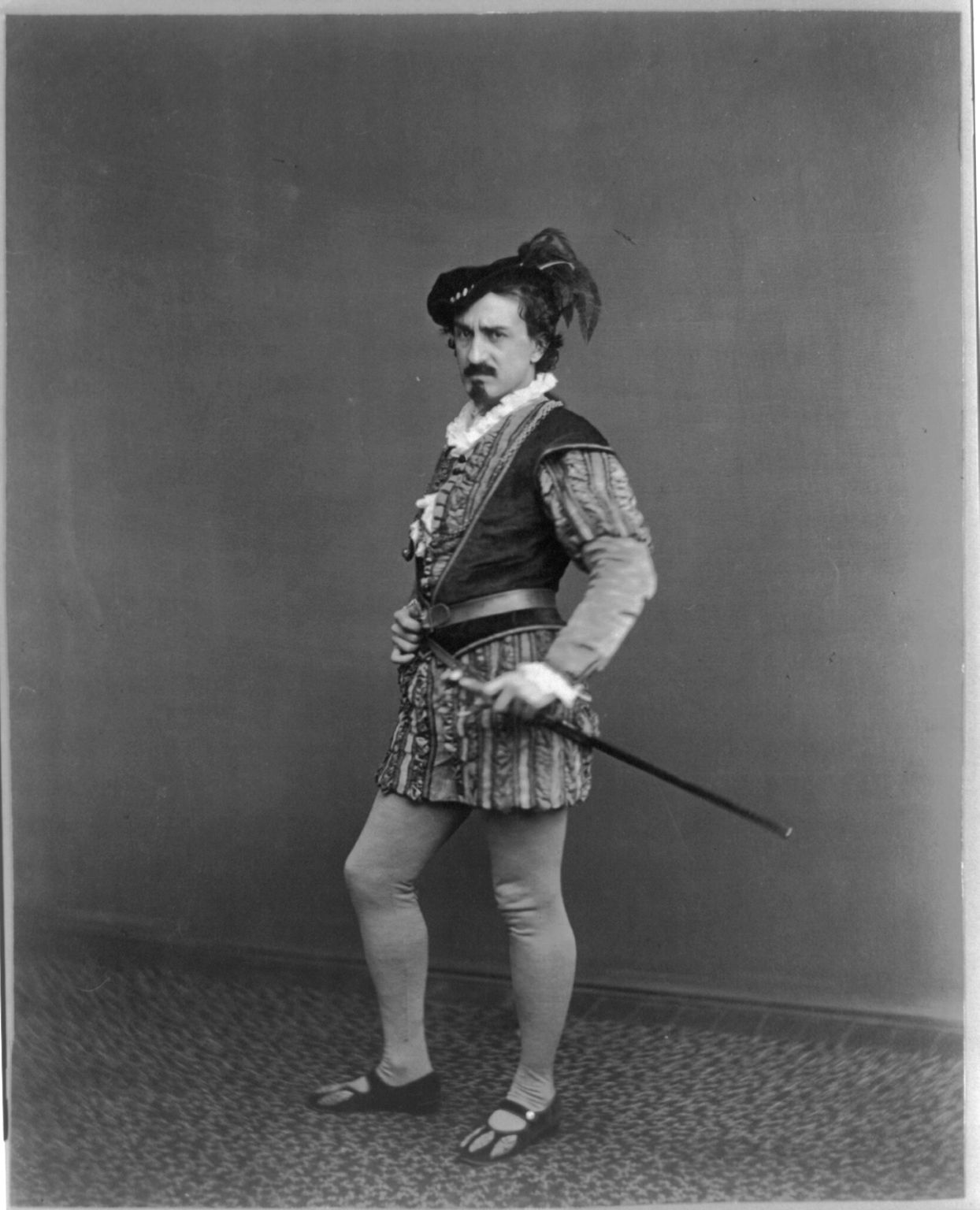
Edwin Booth as Iago, ca. 1870

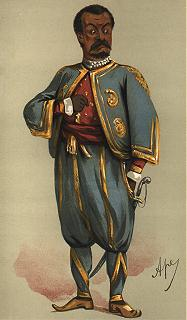
Italian actor Tommaso Salvini as Othello, 1875

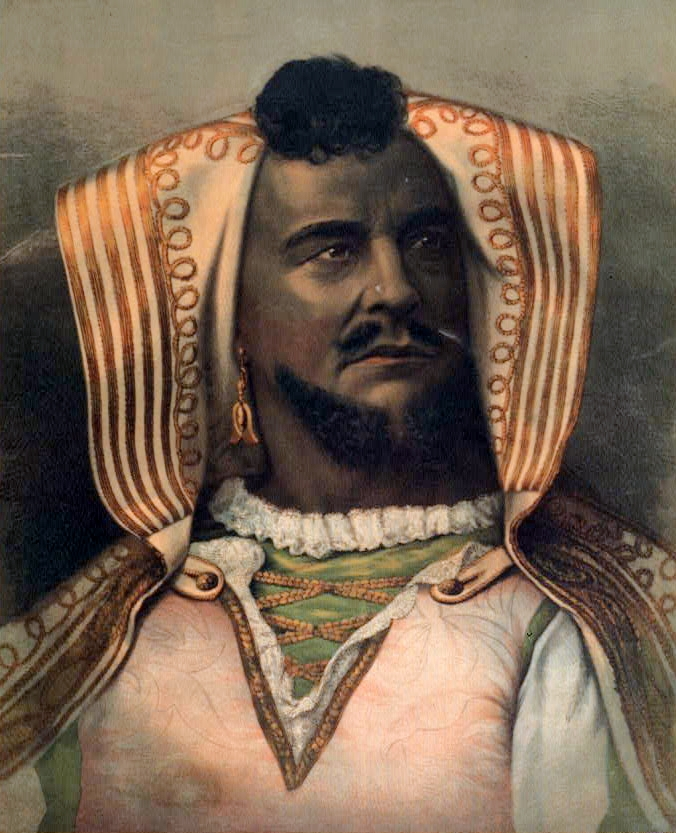
American actor John McCullough as Othello, 1878

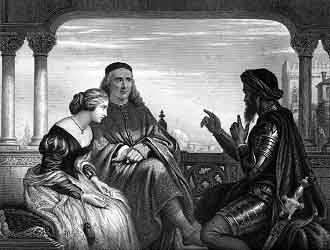
Othello relating his adventures to Desdemona and Brabantio from a steel engraving of a painting by Charles West Cope, 1873

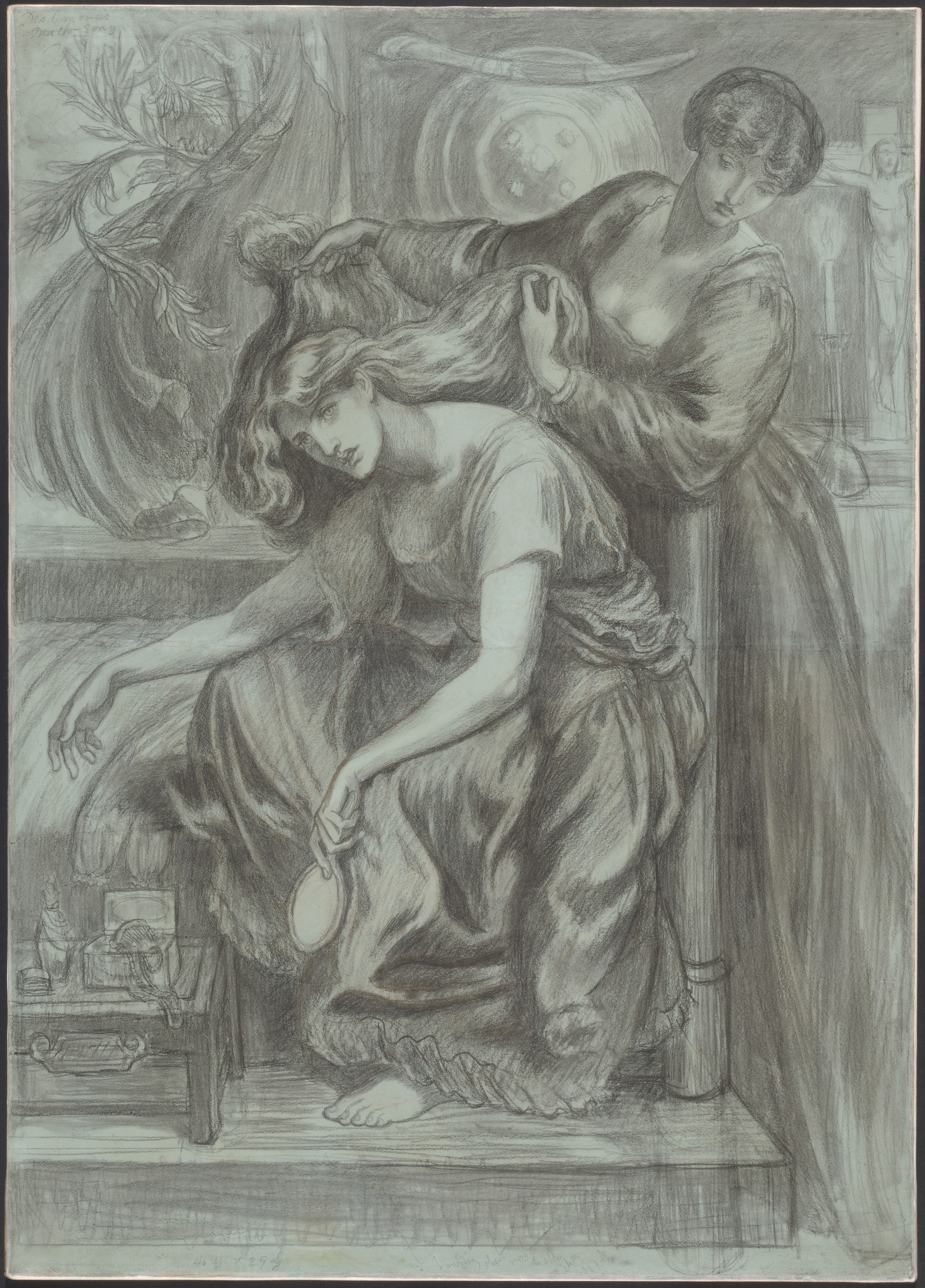
Desdemona's Death Song by Dante Gabriel Rossetti, ca. 1878–1881

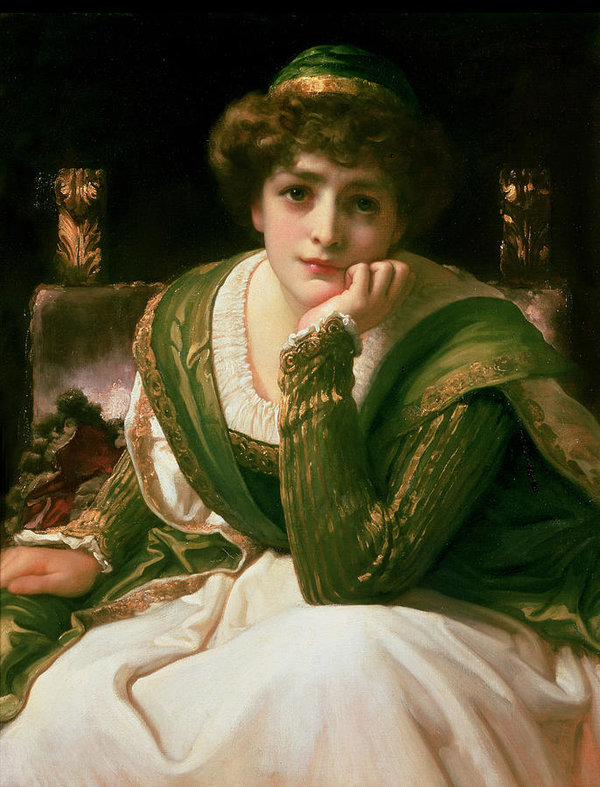
Desdemona by Frederic Leighton, ca. 1888

Petre Otskheli design for Othello, staged by Kote Marjanishvili, 1933

== In opera ==
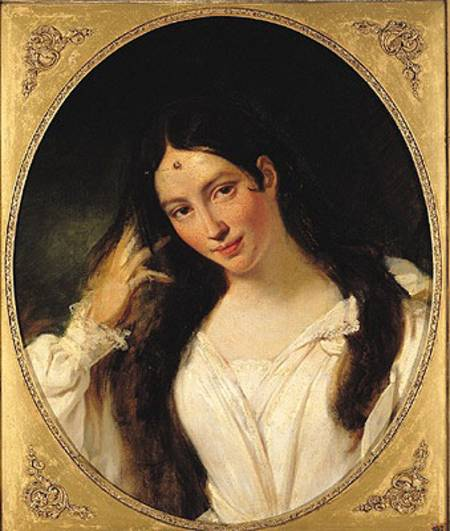
Maria Malibran as Rossini's Desdemona by François Bouchot, 1834

Otello, a four-act opera with an Italian libretto by Francesco Maria Berio di Salsa and music by Gioachino Rossini was first performed at the Teatro del Fondo, Naples, on 4 December 1816. In contrast to Shakespeare's version, di Salsa provided an alternative happy ending to the work, a common practice with drama and opera at one time.

Giuseppe Verdi and Arrigo Boito wrote Otello. Verdi and his librettist dispensed with the first act of the play. Franco Zeffirelli's 1986 film version of Verdi's opera starring Plácido Domingo as Othello was nominated for the BAFTA for foreign language film. However, it did not win the award. According to the Kennedy Center's biographical note on Domingo, Laurence Olivier saw Domingo in Otello and, in a mock-furious voice, told Franco Zeffirelli: "You realise that Domingo plays Othello as well as I do, and he has that voice!"

== In ballet ==
Mexican choreographer José Limón created a 20-minute, four character ballet called The Moor's Pavane to the music of Henry Purcell in 1949. It is a standard in dance companies around the world and notable interpreters of the Moor include Rudolf Nureyev.

The ballet Othello was choreographed by John Neumeier to music by Arvo Pärt, Alfred Schnittke, Naná Vasconcelos et al. and was premiered by the Hamburg Ballet in Hamburg on 27 January 1985, with Gamal Gouda as Othello, Gigi Hyatt as Desdemona, and Max Midinet as Iago. The work remains in the repertoire of the Hamburg Ballet, seeing its 100th performance in 2008.

Another Othello ballet, by Iranian Armenian composer Loris Tjeknavorian, was commissioned by the Northern Ballet company and was shown in London in 1985. The musical score, performed by the London Symphony Orchestra, was recorded by EMI.

In 2002, modern dance choreographer Lar Lubovitch created a full-length ballet in three acts based on the Shakespeare play and Cinthio's tale with a score by Elliot Goldenthal. The work has been staged by the San Francisco Ballet with Desmond Richardson, Yuan Yuan Tan, and Parrish Maynard in the principal roles. The ballet was broadcast on PBS's Great Performances: Dance in America and the program was nominated for an Emmy Award. The ballet is recorded on Kultur video. Othello was first performed in New York City at the Metropolitan Opera House, 23 May 1997, by American Ballet Theatre.

== In film ==
"Othello" (5:05)
The American actor James Earl Jones performs Othello's Act I, scene III monologue from Shakespeare Othello at the White House Evening of Poetry, Music, and the Spoken Word on 12 May 2009.

"Othello"
Audio only version

See also Shakespeare on screen (Othello).

Between 1948 and 1952, Orson Welles directed The Tragedy of Othello: The Moor of Venice (1952), produced as a black-and-white film noir. Rather than focusing on racial disparity, the film plays on a difference between Desdemona and Othello in age, size and personal attractiveness. The film noir colouring of the picture minimised any commentary on Othello's blackness, to the point that the critic F. R. Leavis wrote that the film made no reference to Othello's colour.

Unlike Welles's film, Stuart Burge's Othello (1965), based on John Dexter's National Theatre Company's production, starring Laurence Olivier, brings issues of race to the fore.

Trevor Nunn's 1989 version, filmed at Stratford, cast black opera singer Willard White in the leading role, opposite Ian McKellen's Iago.

The first major screen production casting a black actor as Othello would not come until 1995 with Laurence Fishburne opposite Kenneth Branagh's Iago. It was made during the O. J. Simpson trial and commentators such as Cartmell draw parallels between the two whodunit murder stories, and wondered if the film's release was not a little to do with the publicity surrounding Simpson's drama. A modernised, loose retelling, O, completed in 1999 and released in 2001, featured African-American actor Mekhi Phifer in the lead role, which was renamed from "Othello" to "Odin James" or "O. J.", with the story set in an American high school and revolving around sports rather than warfare.

Malayalam film Kaliyattam is an adapted version of Othello against the backdrop of the Hindu Theyyam performance. In 1998, Suresh Gopi received the National Film Award for Best Actor, and Jayaraj the award for Best Director for their work on the film.

Omkara is a version in Hindi set in Uttar Pradesh, starring Ajay Devgan as Omkara (Othello), Saif Ali Khan as Langda Tyagi (Iago), Kareena Kapoor as Dolly (Desdemona), Vivek Oberoi as Kesu (Cassio), Bipasha Basu as Billo (Bianca) and Konkona Sen Sharma as Indu (Emilia). The film was directed by Vishal Bhardwaj who earlier adapted Shakespeare's Macbeth as Maqbool. All characters in the film share the same letter or sound in their first name as in the original Shakespeare classic. It is one of the few mainstream Indian movies to contain uncensored profanity.

== In other film adaptations ==
- 1909 silent film shot in Venice
- 1909 German directed by, and stars, Franz Porten as Othello, Henny Porten as Desdemona, and Rosa Porten as Emilia.
- 1914 silent film shot in Venice
- 1922 Othello, German, starring Emil Jannings as Othello, Werner Krauss as Iago, and Ica von Lenkeffy as Desdemona
- 1947 Othello forms the backdrop for the 1947 film noir A Double Life in which actor Anthony Johns (Ronald Colman) becomes so immersed in the production, that he takes on the Moor's murderous jealousy in his real life.
- 1952 Othello, United States, directed by, and stars, Orson Welles as Othello, also starring Micheál Mac Liammóir as Iago, Robert Coote as Roderigo, Suzanne Cloutier as Desdemona, Michael Laurence as Cassio, Fay Compton as Emilia and Doris Dowling as Bianca.
- 1956 Othello, USSR, starring Sergei Bondarchuk, Irina Skobtseva, Andrei Popov. Directed by Sergei Yutkevich.
- 1956 Jubal, Western setting
- 1962 All Night Long (British) Othello is Rex, a jazz bandleader. Dave Brubeck and other jazz musicians appear in the film.
- 1965 Othello with Laurence Olivier, Maggie Smith, Frank Finlay, and Joyce Redman
- 1967 Othello-67. Directed by Fyodor Khitruk. A 50-second animated parody made for Montreal's Expo 67.
- 1974 Catch My Soul adapted from Jack Good's rock musical, directed by Patrick McGoohan and starring Richie Havens, Lance LeGault, Season Hubley and Tony Joe White.
- 1982 Othello, the Black Commando written by and starring Max H. Boulois with Tony Curtis as Colonel Iago and Joanna Pettet as Desdemona
- 1986 Otello, adaptation of Verdi's opera of the same name
- 1992 Champakulam Thachan, a Malayalam film.
- 1995 Othello with Kenneth Branagh, Laurence Fishburne, and Irène Jacob. Directed by Oliver Parker.
- 1997 Kaliyattam in Malayalam, a modern update, set in Kerala, starring Suresh Gopi as Othello, which won him the national award for best actor, Lal as Iago, Manju Warrier as Desdemona, directed by Jayaraaj.
- 1997 Othello: Dangerous Desire (alternative title: Othello 2000), a modern hardcore pornographic re-telling directed by Joe D'Amato and starring Sean Michaels.
- 2001 O, a modern update, set in an American high school. Stars Mekhi Phifer as Odin (Othello), Julia Stiles as Desi (Desdemona), and Josh Hartnett as Hugo (Iago).
- 2002 Eloise a modern update, set in Sydney, Australia.
- 2004 Stage Beauty, a romantic period drama, set in the 17th century, on the theme of male and female actors playing women's roles – with the role of Desdemona as the example.
- 2006 Omkara, a Hindi film adaptation of Othello starring Bollywood megastar Ajay Devgan as Omkara (Othello), directed by Vishal Bhardwaj
- 2008 Jarum Halus a modern updated Malaysian version, in English and Malay by Mark Tan.
- 2012 Otel•lo, a free adaptation directed by Hammudi Al-Rahmoun Font.

== On television ==
- 1955 Othello, aired on BBC Television, with Gordon Heath as Othello. A telerecording of the broadcast still exists
- 1981 Othello, part of the BBC's complete works Shakespeare. Starring Anthony Hopkins and Bob Hoskins.
- 1990 Othello (1990) A videotaped version of the last Royal Shakespeare Company production at The Other Place starring Willard White, Ian McKellen, Clive Swift, Michael Grandage, Sean Baker, and Imogen Stubbs. Directed by Trevor Nunn.
- 2001 Othello. British made-for-TV film. A modern-day adaptation in modern English, in which Othello is the first black Commissioner of London's Metropolitan Police. Made for ITV by LWT. Scripted by Andrew Davies. Directed by Geoffrey Sax. Starring Eamonn Walker, Christopher Eccleston and Keeley Hawes.
- 2008 Othello, The Tragedy of The Moor. A two-hour television adaptation starring Carlo Rota in the title role. Director Zaib Shaikh maintains the theatrical feel of the play, while shooting in a studio-controlled environment. Also starring Matthew Deslippe as Iago, Christine Horne as Desdemona, Graham Abbey as Cassio. The adaptation was co-written by Zaib Shaikh and Matthew Edison.
- 2011– An Indian daily soap named "Gunahon ka Devta" aired on Imagine TV was loosely based on Shakespeare's famed Othello
- 2022 Tulsa King starring Sylvester Stalone visually features the book and his character is said to have read it during his incarceration.

== In music ==
- In 1891-2, the Bohemian/Czech composer Antonin Dvořák composed the overture 'Othello', Op 93 (cf Othello)
- In 1914, the Ukrainian-born Sergei Bortkiewicz composed his orchestral Symphonic poem after 'Othello', Op 19.
- In 1963, the Soviet composer Vladimir Yurovsky finished his tragic Symphonic poem for a narrator, choir and orchestra after 'Othello', Op. 58.
- In 1987, Australian singer Paul Kelly wrote a song called "Desdemona", a reference to Othello's love interest.
- Chicago-based hip-hop group Q Brothers created a modern adaptation with Othello being a record producer called "Othello: The Remix."
- In 2014 R&B artist SZA referenced characters from Othello and Shakespeare himself on her song "Childs Play": "Come Desdemona / Othello and tragedies / Shakespearean sorrows".
- In 2016 R&B artist Frank Ocean referenced Othello in his song Nikes "Must be on that white like Othello".
- "Send Them Off!", song by British band Bastille is inspired by both Othello and the classic horror film The Exorcist.
- In 2017 singer-songwriter Harry Styles possibly referenced Act III Scene III in his song "Sweet Creature."

== Graphic novels ==
Othello, an adaptation by Oscar Zárate, Oval Projects Ltd (1985). It was reprinted in 2005 by Can of Worms Press and includes the complete text of the play.

In January 2009, a manga adaptation was published in the United Kingdom, with art by Ryuta Osada. It is part of the Manga Shakespeare series by Richard Appignanesi, and is set in Venice in carnival season.

== Fiction ==
Christopher Moore combines Othello and The Merchant of Venice in his 2014 comic novel The Serpent of Venice, in which he makes Portia (from The Merchant of Venice) and Desdemona (from Othello) sisters. All of the characters come from those two plays with the exception of Pocket, the Fool, who comes from Moore's earlier novel based on King Lear.

The supporting character Iago in Disney franchise Aladdin is named after the antagonist of the play, Iago. I, Iago by Nicole Galland depicts Iago, as the protagonist and explores his potential motivations and history.

The plot of the Portuguese language novel Dom Casmurro by the Brazilian author Machado de Assis, a translator of Othello into Portuguese, is based upon the play. It is generally considered one of the great novels of Brazilian literature.

In 2017, Hogarth (a division of Penguin Random House company) published, as part of the Shakespeare Project, a novel by Tracy Chevalier, New Boy. The characters from Othello are transposed in a Washington D.C. school where eleven-year-old boys and girls re-enact the shakespearian tragedy but in the 1970s.

Mustafa Said, the Sudanese central figure of Tayeb Salih's Arabic language novel Season of Migration to the North (1966) refers to himself as Othello and kills his English wife with Jean Morris with a knife out of jealousy.

== Other ==
- Othello Cake, Danish cake with a Macaron base, cream and chocolate glaze. The cake is named after the play, with the white cream and dark chocolate signifying the relationship between Desdemona and Othello.
