= Yas =

Yas or YAS may refer to:

- Yas (slang), an affirmative in English
- Yas (yacht), a superyacht built in 2011 in Abu Dhabi
- Yas (rapper), Iranian rapper
- Y.A.S., a French electronic music duo formed in 2007
- Yas Island, an island in Abu Dhabi
  - Yas Mall, a mall opened in 2014
  - Yas Hotel or W Abu Dhabi - Yas Island, a hotel built in 2009
- Yorkshire Ambulance Service
- Yorkshire Archaeological Society

== See also ==
- Cyclone Yaas, a North Indian Ocean cyclone in 2021
- Cyclone Yasa, a tropical cyclone in the South Pacific in 2020
- Cyclone Yasi, a tropical cyclone in the Australian region in 2011
- Yaz (disambiguation)
