= Cluster Paintings =

Series of paintings by Nabil Kanso

Widening of the Earth's Vault oil on canvas, 3 X 4.25 meters (10 X 14 feet), 1987

Cluster Paintings are a series of paintings created by Nabil Kanso in 1986–1988. They are characterized by compositions that divide the canvas space into sections reflecting a cluster of irregular shaped planes offering variations of contrasts and viewpoints. These characteristics expanded in later works such as the America and Living Memories series.

== See also ==
- The Floating Shadows
