= Apocalyptic Rider =

1980 painting by Nabil Kanso

- Artist: Nabil Kanso
- Year: 1980
- Medium: oil on canvas
- Dimensions: 200 cm × 265 cm (79 in × 104 in)

Apocalyptic Rider is a painting created by Nabil Kanso in 1980. It is oil on canvas measuring 7 X 9 feet (2 X 2.65 meters), and is part of a series depicting horsemen in compositions dealing with apocalyptic themes.

The painting depicts a scene in which a horseman appears riding forward between two horizontally juxtaposed horses. The "Rider," symbolically representing horseman of the Apocalypse, is shown moving toward a figure falling near a mother holding a child. The composition of the picture is focused on the image formed by the rider and horses in the central plane. Its area, which occupies much of the pictorial space, appears to links the background and foreground, and to reinforce the tense atmosphere generated by the subject matter and the rendering of dense layers of paint applied with broad brushstrokes across the entire surface. The tone reflects a contrast of blue black against red. Some art critics interpreted the work as a metaphor for the wars in Central America and the Middle East. Others suggest that the compositional conception of the figures, colors, symbols and textures give a sense of imminent threat underlining the depicted theme.

== See also ==
- Apocalyptic Riders
- Apocalypse Series
