= Khalil al-Jamal =

First Lebanese commando killed in the Israeli-Palestinian conflict (1951–1968)

Khalil Izz el-Deen al-Jamal (Arabic: خليل عز الدين الجمل; January 21, 1951 – 15 April 1968) was the first Lebanese commando to be killed in action in the Israeli–Palestinian conflict. His death in April 1968 in Jordan, during a skirmish with Israeli forces known as the Battle of Tel Arbaein ("Hill Forty", (تل الاربعين)), resulted in hundreds of Lebanese youth joining the Palestinian fedayeen. His funeral, attended by between 150,000 and 250,000 people, was widely seen as an expression of Lebanese solidarity with the Palestinian cause.

== Biography ==
=== Early life ===
Born on January 21, 1951, to Lebanese parents. His father was Ezz El Din Mohamed Eljamal and his mother was Widad Mustafa Shehab. He completed his elementary in the Modern School in Beirut then attended Al Mokhales evening school (مدرسة "المخلص"المسائية). He used to work during the day and study at night. By virtue of his work with his older brother, Nabil, he was always in the library educating himself, which acquainted himself with the Arab - Israeli conflict.

=== Battle of Tel Arbaein ===
On the evening of 15 April 1968, a Palestinian commando group received a signal from one of the advanced monitoring units that some Israeli tanks and armored vehicles entered the Arab area in the Jordan Valley from "Pardes Abu Vrides". Additionally, a helicopter dropped more than 30 paratroopers in the region. They were under the observation of the Palestinian Al Asefa forces which signaled to their comrades to ambush them at Tell Arbaein (تل الأربعين; Hill 40). Khalil was part of the ambushing unit. The guerrilla group divided themselves into three units then clashed with the Israeli troops from three different sides and caused them 10 casualties. The Israeli forces began to regress, carrying their wounded and dead from the area of engagement. Khalil was among the group that chased the remnants of the Israeli troops as they retreated to their positions until they reached beyond the ceasefire line. While Khalil was protecting the withdrawal of his comrades, he was hit by a rocket-propelled grenade in the shoulder. He refused the help of his comrades to pull him back and preferred to stay in his position to protect their withdrawal where he got hit and died in the battlefield on 15 April 1968.

=== Funeral and significance ===
His funeral, on April 27, 1968, was attended by some 150,000 people. It lasted more than five hours and it is considered to be the largest that Lebanon has ever witnessed by then. His body was transferred from Jordan to Syria then Lebanon, passing through several villages along the way. Schools were closed in his honor, and even in Christian villages such as the Maronite village of Kahaleh, people came out 'to honour the martyr who died for a noble cause.' Despite the sectarian tensions between Lebanon's diverse ethnic groups, this Maronite village publicly mourned al-Jamal while church bells in the village tolled. In Beirut, the Lebanese national forces decided to start the funeral from the Omari Mosque and the coffin was carried to the martyrs cemetery.

Al Jamal's death was significant because of many factors. As the first Lebanese to die in battle with Israel, this ignited the drive of other Lebanese to join the Palestinian struggle, hundreds of whom went to Syria to undergo military training in May 1968. In this way, his death provided a political opening for the Palestinian fedayeen movement in Lebanon. Prime Minister Abdullah al-Yafi, who attended his funeral along with other political leaders such as the head of the Kataeb Pierre Gemayel, awarded al-Jamal a national medal posthumously.

The Lebanese Army also offered military training to Palestinian refugees, and the often hostile Deuxième Bureau, Lebanon's intelligence service, eased restrictions placed on the residents of the Palestinian refugee camps in Lebanon. However, the sympathy for the Palestinians from the government did not last and within a year of al-Jamal's death, under President Charles Helou, the Deuxième Bureau was again charged with maintaining a strict regime within the refugee camps.
