= Transcendence (Jellum) =

Sculpture in Portland, Oregon, U.S.

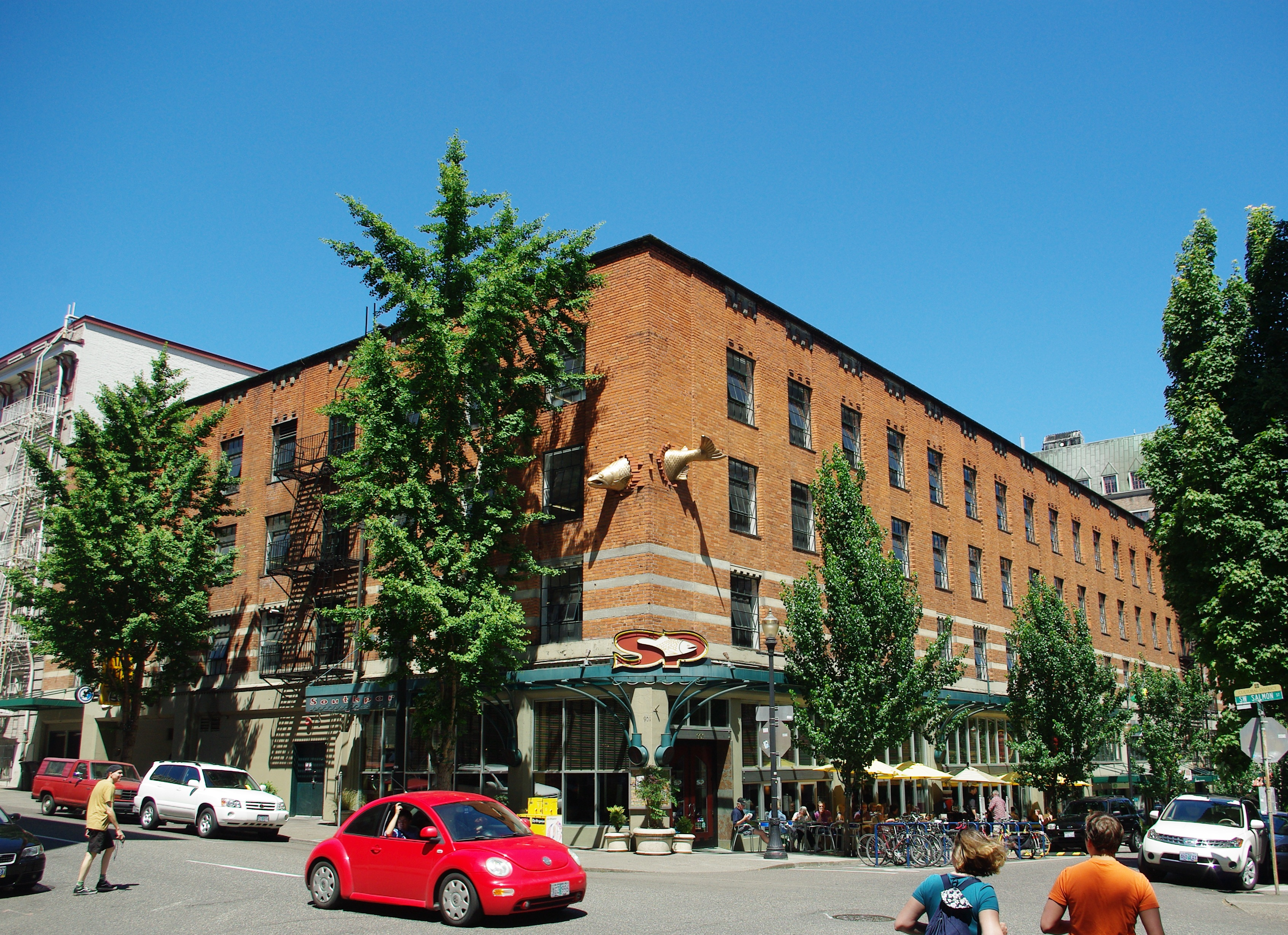
- The sculpture above Southpark Seafood in 2011
- Artist: Keith Jellum
- Type: Sculpture
- Medium: Bronze
- Subject: Fish
- Dimensions: 3.4 m (11 ft)
- Location: Portland, Oregon, United States; 45.51785°N 122.68229°W

Transcendence is an outdoor sculpture by Keith Jellum, located in Portland, Oregon, United States. It depicts a fish flying through the brickwork above Southpark Seafood at the northwestern corner of Southwest Salmon Street and Southwest Park Avenue in Downtown Portland.

The sculpture measures 11 feet (3.4 m) long and is made of hand forged and welded bronze. Seattle Post-Intelligencer said of the sculpture and its relation to the city: "There is much in the way of art there and one cannot get a bad coffee, beer or glass of wine there. People there are friendly and not above being whimsical, perhaps this is why Keith Jellum's installation found a home in Portland?"

== See also ==
- Mimir (sculpture) (1980) and Electronic Poet (1984), other sculptures by Keith Jellum in Portland
