= Jazz (disambiguation) =

Jazz is a style of music and its subgenres.

Jazz may also refer to:

== Computing ==
- Jazz (computer), a development platform used by Microsoft
- Jazz (mobile network operator), a mobile network operator in Pakistan
- Jazztel, a Spanish telecommunications company
- IBM Jazz, a team collaboration platform
- Lotus Jazz, a spreadsheet program for Macintosh

== Literature ==
- Jazz (magazine) or Jazz & Pop, a 1962–1972 magazine
- Jazz (manga), a Japanese comic book
- Jazz (novel), a 1992 novel by Toni Morrison
- Jazz (Henri Matisse), a book of prints based on cut-outs by Henri Matisse
- Jazz (picture book), a 2006 children's book by Walter Dean Myers, illustrated by Christopher Myers
- Jazz Magazine, a French magazine about jazz, founded 1954

== Music ==
- Jazz, Ltd., a Dixieland jazz band, nightclub, and record label in Chicago
- Jazz (singer), member of Black Buddafly
- Jazz (Casey Abrams album), (2019)
- Jazz (Ry Cooder album) (1978)
- Jazz (John Handy album) (1962)
- Jazz (Queen album) (1978)
- Jazz (Wallace Roney album) (2007)
- Jazz (Tenacious D EP) (2012)
- "Jazz (We've Got)", a song by A Tribe Called Quest from The Low End Theory

== Sports ==
- Jazz (wrestler) or Carlene Begnaud (born 1972), professional wrestler
- Utah Jazz, NBA basketball team in Salt Lake City, Utah
- FC Jazz, a Finnish association football team

== Radio stations ==
- ABC Jazz, an Australian radio station
- NPO Soul & Jazz, a Dutch radio station

== People with the name ==
- Jazz Carlin (born 1990), Welsh competitive swimmer
- Jazz Cartier (born 1993), Canadian rapper
- Jazz Chisholm Jr. (born 1998), Bahamian baseball player
- Jazz Gillum (1904–1966), American blues harmonica player
- Jazz Guignard (active 1930s), Haitian jazz musician
- Jazz Janewattananond (born 1995), Thai professional golfer
- Jazz Jennings (born 2000), American LGBTQ rights activist
- Jazz Ocampo (born 1997), Filipina actress and model
- Jazz Raycole (born 1988), American actress and dancer
- Jazz Richards (born 1991), Welsh footballer
- Jazz Summers (1944–2015), British music manager
- Jazz Tevaga (born 1995), New Zealand rugby league player

=== Fictional ===
- Jazz Curtis, a character from Home and Away
- Jazz Fenton, an animated character from Nickelodeon's Danny Phantom
- Jazz Turner, British paralympic sailor

== Other uses ==
- Jazz Aviation, an airline in Canada
- Jazz (apple)
- Jazz (design), a design introduced on disposable cups in 1992
- Jazz (Kanso series), a 1979 series of paintings by Nabil Kanso
- Jazz (Italian EMU), Italian Electric multiple units (EMU) used for commuter regional trains
- Jazz (miniseries), a 2001 documentary produced by Ken Burns for PBS
- Jazz (perfume), a fragrance by Yves Saint Laurent
- Jazz (soft drink), a soda product from Pepsi-Cola
- Jazz (Transformers), a robot superhero character
- Jazz (word), etymology and usage
- Honda Jazz or Honda Fit, a hatchback

== See also ==
- Jahss, Boxer's fracture
- Jazz dance
- Larry "Jazz" Anthony (born 1977), American R&B singer
- The homophone Yaz
