= Kuwait (disambiguation) =

Kuwait is a country in West Asia.

Kuwait may also refer to:

== Defunct states ==
- Kuwait Governorate, 1990–1991, a post-annexation Iraqi province in Kuwait
  - Republic of Kuwait, the brief prior 1990 puppet state of Iraq
- Qu'aiti, 1858–1967, a sultanate in southern Arabia
- Sheikhdom of Kuwait, 1752–1961, the predecessor of Kuwait

== Other uses ==
- Kuwait (Kanso series), 1990–1991, by American painter Nabil Kanso
- Kuwait SC, an association football club (formed 1960)
- Kuwait SC (basketball)

== See also ==
- Kuwait City, capital of Kuwait
- Kuwaiti (disambiguation)
