= Thor (sculpture) =

Sculpture by Melvin Schuler in Portland, Oregon, U.S.

- The sculpture in 2015
- Artist: Melvin Schuler
- Year: 1977
- Type: Sculpture
- Medium: Copper; redwood
- Subject: Thor
- Location: Portland, Oregon, United States; 45°31′04″N 122°40′45″W

Thor is an outdoor 1977 copper and redwood sculpture by American artist Melvin Schuler, located on the Transit Mall of downtown Portland, Oregon.

== Description and history ==
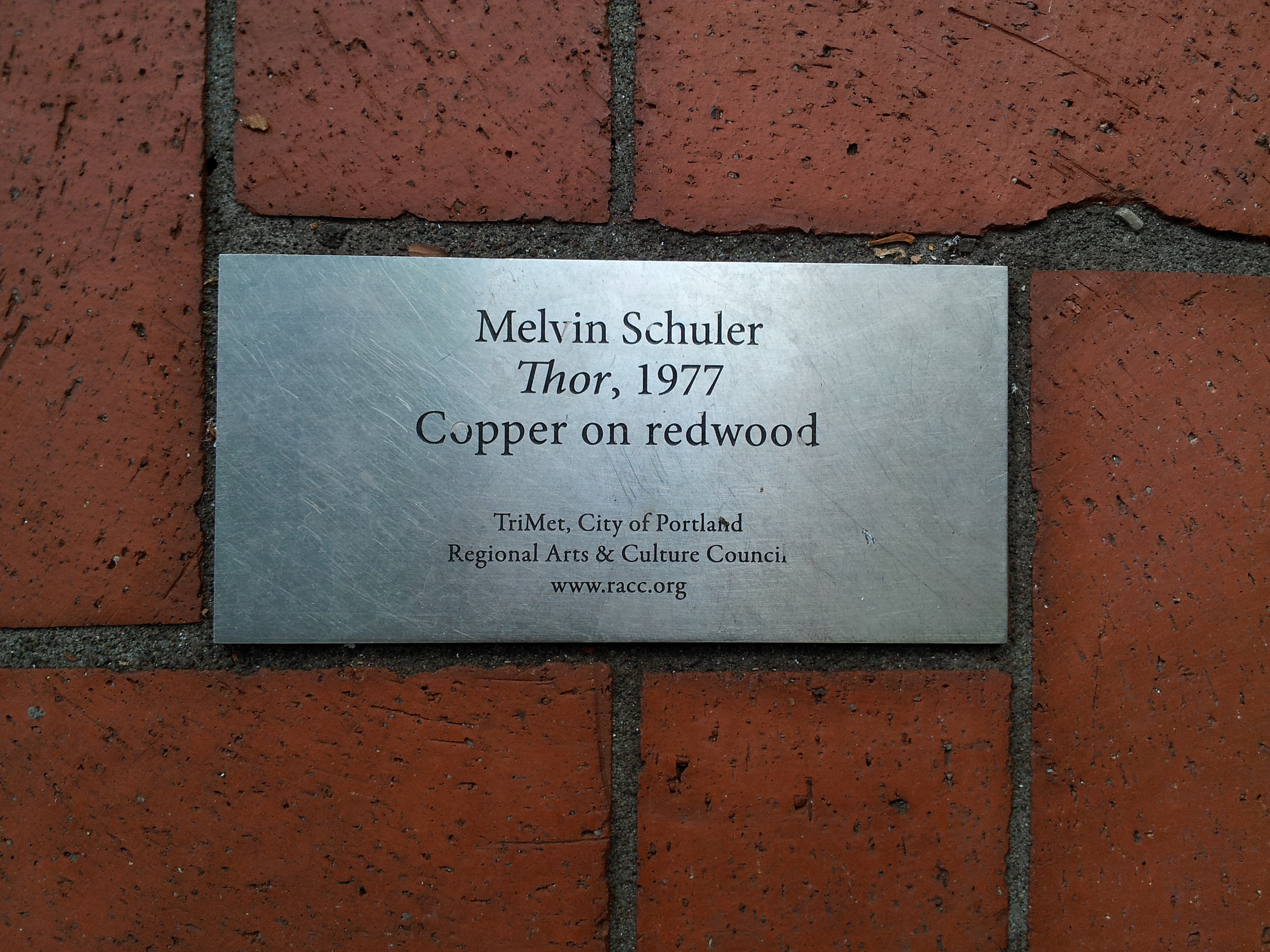
Plaque for the sculpture: Melvin Schuler Thor, 1977 Copper on redwood TriMet, City of Portland Regional Arts & Culture Council www.racc.org

Thor is an abstract outdoor sculpture depicting Thor, the hammer-wielding god of thunder in Norse mythology. Located at the intersection of Southwest 6th Avenue and Southwest Taylor Street in the Portland Transit Mall, the copper on redwood sculpture was completed in 1977, funded by TriMet and the United States Department of Transportation. It measures 7 feet (2.1 m) x 4 feet (1.2 m) x 4 feet (1.2 m). According to the Regional Arts & Culture Council, the agency which administers Thor, "This piece served as a excellent example of Schuler's work, which is characterized by large cubic and angular sculptures achieved by hammering copper onto carved redwood. This process creates a unique and recognizable finish to his sculptures." The sculpture was previously located at Southwest 5th between Washington and Alder.

== See also ==
- 1977 in art
- Mimir (sculpture) by Keith Jellum (1980), a sculpture in Portland depicting the Norse god Mímir
- Norse mythology in popular culture
