= Living Memory (paintings) =

Series of paintings by Nabil Kanso

Extinguishing the Sun, the Moon and the Stars, diptych, oil on canvas, 3.65 X 6 meters (12 X 20 feet), 1993

Living Memory is the title of a series of 9 mural-size paintings on the Holocaust painted by Nabil Kanso in 1980, 1990 and 1993–94.

== Works in the series ==
- Roll-Call at the Black Wall, oil on canvas, 3 X 4.87 meters (10 X 16 feet), 1980
- The Flow of Pain, oil on canvas, 3.65 X 5.50 meters (12 X 18 Feet), 1990
- Extinguishing the Light (1), oil on canvas, 3.65 X 3 meters (12 X 10 feet), 1993–94
- Extinguishing the Light (2), oil on canvas, 3.65 X 3 meters (12 X 10 feet), 1993–94
- The Gasping Flame (1), oil on canvas, 3.65 X 3 meters (12 X 10 feet), 1993–94
- The Gasping Flame (2), oil on canvas, 3.65 X 3 meters (12 X 10 feet), 1993–94
- Cries and Silence (1), oil on canvas, 3.65 X 3 meters (12 X 10 feet), 1993–94
- Cries and Silence, (2), oil on canvas, 3.65 X 3 meters (12 X 10 feet), 1993–94
- Living Memory, oil on canvas, 3.65 X 5.50 meters (12 X 18 feet), 1993–94

== See also ==
- The Floating Shadows (triptych)
- Cluster Paintings
