= Southpark Seafood =

Seafood restaurant in Portland, Oregon, U.S.

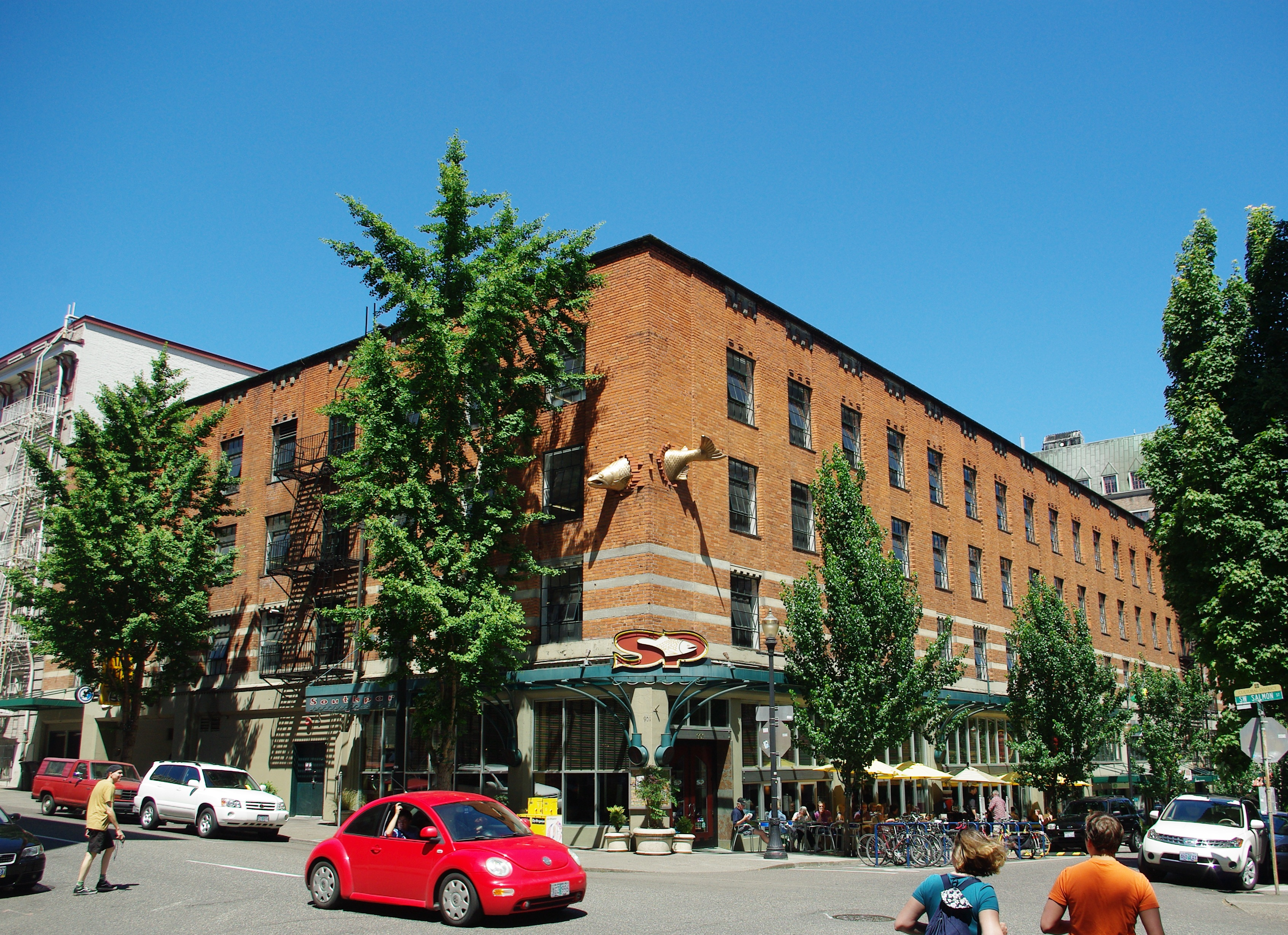
- The restaurant's exterior in 2011
- Interactive map of Southpark Seafood

Restaurant information
- Food type: Seafood
- Location: 901 Southwest Salmon Street, Portland, Oregon, 97205, United States
- Coordinates: 45.5181°N 122.6824°W
- Website: southparkseafood.com

Southpark Seafood is a seafood restaurant in Portland, Oregon, United States.

== Description ==
Southpark Seafood serves seafood in downtown Portland. The menu includes oysters on the half shell.

Keith Jellum's bronze sculpture of a fish, Transcendence, is installed on the restaurant's exterior.

== History ==
The restaurant began a series of remodels in 2016. Additionally, the business launched an oyster bar and virtual farm-to-table tours. Christopher Robertson became executive chef in 2017.

The restaurant participated in Portland's Dumpling Week in 2026.

== Reception ==
Carrie Uffindell included Southpark in Eater Portland's 2019 list of "Primo Kid-Friendly Restaurants in Portland". The website's Jenni Moore included the business in a 2021 list of "12 Stellar Portland Seafood Restaurants". Southpark was also included in Eater Portland's 2022 overview of "Where to Eat and Drink in Downtown Portland". Katherine Chew Hamilton and Brooke Jackson-Glidden included Southpark in the website's 2025 list of the city's best restaurants and food cart pods for large groups.

== See also ==
- List of seafood restaurants
