= Vietnam (Kanso) =

1974 painting by Nabil Kanso

- Artist: Nabil Kanso
- Year: 1974
- Medium: oil on canvas
- Dimensions: 3.65 m × 7.30 m (12.0 ft × 24.0 ft)

Vietnam is a mural-size painting made by Nabil Kanso in 1974 in response to the Vietnam War. It is done in oil on canvas measuring 3.65 by 7.30 meters (12.0 by 24.0 ft).

== See also ==
- The Split of Life
