= Leaves from the Theatre of War =

Series of drawings by Nabil Kanso

Leaves from the Theatre of War: Stage setting, pen and ink, 43 X 36 cm (17 X 14 inches), 1989

Leaves from the Theatre of War is the title of a series of 250 ink drawings by Nabil Kanso. The series depicts a long sequence of wide-ranging images reflecting satiric tonality and expressions on war and the human tragicomedy. The works were done at various intervals between 1980 and 1992.
