= Faust (paintings) =

Series of paintings by Nabil Kanso

- Faust: Encounter with Margaret mixed mediums on paperboard 40X30in (102X76cm), 1976
- Artist: Nabil Kanso
- Completion date: 1976-1979
- Subject: Goethe's Faust Part One and Part Two

Faust is a series of approximately 100 paintings created between 1976 and 1979 by Nabil Kanso. The paintings depict figural compositions in a sequence of scenes whose subjects are loosely based on Goethe's 1808 play Faust Part One and Part Two.

In dealing with the human drama, the paintings in the series embody imagery reflecting various aspects of the entanglement of the relationship between three primary figures that may visually represent Faust, the old scholar who pledges his soul to the devil in exchange for youth and love, Mephistopheles, the Devil's representative who provides Faust with his needs, and Margaret (Gretchen), the young woman who is "seduced and made unhappy by the evildoer."

== Style ==
The Faust paintings are characterized by intense imagery rendered with a combination of dripping paint, aggressive brushstrokes, and applying several layers of black, orange, red, and yellow colors forming agitated areas around the figures. Light seems to emerge through broken and impenetrable bars that traverse from one image to another appear to intensify the space occupied by the figures and the areas of light and dark.

The relationship between the figures reveals images of tensions, pathos, and sexuality. In dealing with Faust as a subject for painting, the works "make no attempt to narrate the tales that inspired them, but dive into an exploration of the emotions of the characters."

== Paintings ==
The series comprises about 70 oils on canvas ranging in size from 58 by 48 inches (150 cm × 120 cm) and 72 by 60 inches (180 cm × 150 cm) to 74 by 128 inches (190 cm × 330 cm), and 30 mixed mediums on paperboard measuring 30 by 40 inches (76 cm × 102 cm) executed in three phases during a three-year period of the late 1970s. The paintings are sequentially grouped under 22 headings forming 12 sections:

1. Faust and the Earth Spirit: A sequence of paintings with agitated rhythm and tangled webs of black paint over layers of red and yellow colors depicting scenes of dim enclosures and various gothic settings that provide the ground for the appearance of figures representing Faust, Mephistopheles, and various characters, metamorphosis, and symbols of the earth-spirit and macrocosm.
2. Auerbach's Cellar: Compositions with scenes depicting two males figures with dual characteristics reflecting Faust and Mephistopheles among revelers in a tavern and at the Witch's Kitchen.
3. Street : Street scenes with triangular figures representing Faust and Mephistopheles encountering Margaret.
4. Garden: Images of Margaret in her room before a mirror holding pieces of jewelry, and situated with other figures. Subsequent garden scenes of dancing, promenading and embracing figures, and flora of daisies alluding to Margaret's vow of love as she plucks a daisy pulling out the petals one by one "Loves me -not- loves me."
5. Cave and Well: The paintings depict scenes of two figures representing Faust and Mephistopheles confronting each other in a face to face struggle and fight in a cave setting as a metaphor for an underground enclave of a hideout space. The pictures are followed by scenes of Margaret at the well bathing her limbs and surrounded by a swirl of figures, flowers, jugs, and water alluding to elements of embryology.
6. Evening and Night: The Evening pictures depict amorous figures in an interior. They are followed by street night scenes reflecting the killing of Margaret's brother Valentine.
7. Cathedral: The paintings depict various scenes of confrontation, child birth and abandonment in compositions involving several moving and gesturing figures conveying a sense of tension and contrast between the figure representing Margaret and the various figures surrounding her with gestures of accusation and condemnation.
8. Walpurgis Night: large canvases depicting bacchanalia and orgiastic scenes reflecting the wild and festive ceremonies at the Harz mountains. The Walpurgis Night and Walpurgis Night Dream paintings make reference to Goethe's poem containing the exchange between Faust, Mephistopheles and the naked witches in a scene depicting the dancing couples against a background of tree trunks forming a wide open space penetrated by a spanned-wing bird.
9. Dungeon: The images reveal two riders storming along on black horses, and scenes of the two entering a dungeon reflecting the prison where Margaret and her child are held. Subsequent scenes show the entanglement of the trio in a variety of situations.
10. Dreaming of Helen: The paintings portray Helen's world in scenes that depart from the actual subject of the literary source, and veer toward mythological themes in compositions characterized by vigorously expressed imagery of turbulent figures and various metaphors.
11. Deep Region: various compositions depicting lovers and scenes reflecting Mephistopheles lustful and seductive encounter with the angels.
12. Twilight: the paintings depict scenes focusing on a fallen, despairing, and dying figure. Darkness and Light is the title of a large canvas measuring 168X249cm depicting a death scene in which four female figures surround a dying male figure with one hand raised upwards toward a moon floating around a series of whirling circular forms holding within dark contours several recurring faces metaphorically representing those of Margaret.
