= The Vortices of Wrath (Lebanon 1977) =

1977 painting by Nabil Kanso

The Vortices of Wrath: Lebanon 1977
- Artist: Nabil Kanso
- Year: 1977
- Medium: oil on canvas
- Dimensions: 3 m × 7.60 m (120 in × 299 in)

The Vortices of Wrath (Lebanon 1977) is a triptych painted by Nabil Kanso in 1977. It is part of the Lebanon series began in 1975 in response to the Lebanese Civil War. The triptych is done in oil on canvas measuring 3 by 7.60 meters (9.8 ft × 24.9 ft). The center is 3 by 3 meters (9.8 ft × 9.8 ft) and each side 2.75 by 2.30 meters (9.0 ft × 7.5 ft).

== Description ==
The triptych reflects aggressive use of brushstrokes and intense rendering of relationships of color, form and structure in conveying the atmosphere and mood of the subject matter. Menacing and terrified figures seem to “burst out of the canvas to reveal the inner realities of war”.

The central painting focuses a goddess-like figure with multiple sets of arms and legs suspended in chains and barbed wire. Thick black lines dominate Kanso's work and the presence of chains and barbed wire are common as well. The goddess figure is pulled apart by demons who appear hungry and bloodthirsty. These villainous figures resemble zombies, but not like Russo and Romero's portrayal in their 1990 film Night of the Living Dead where a mindless force compels corpses to feed like mindless puppets. Rather, these zombies appear malicious and precise with their tortures. It is suggested by some art critics that the depicted woman "personifies Lebanon being torn apart from all directions by the forces of terror". She is turned upside down and surrounded by chaotic mess of menacing figures, barbs, chains, and specters of death extending their devastation to the entire space of the canvas. At the bottom of the central panel, a figure with outreached arms envelopes the entire scene, as if to embrace all of the players in light.

The left panels depicts two skeletons with long spines made of the redundant thick black lines, framing the section. They laugh, mockingly. An infant's head, wailing in sadness, serves as a backdrop, constantly reminding us of the loss of Lebanon's youth. A demonic figure reminiscent of St. Michael the Archangel floats above the victim, stabbing it with a long spear. The victim mirrors his assailant, yellow, gaunt, and sporting an identical weapon. Below the jaundiced loser of the battle is a child, weeping and shielding itself from the vision. In one sense of the scene, we witness brother fighting against brother. They could be twins. But the resemblance of the Christian Church represented more likely refers to the Shatila Massacre.

The concept of travesties committed against families as their homes were razed (and experience Kanso understood first-hand) is analyzed in the right-hand panel. The hope for the future of a war-torn country is devoured in the form of a central figure dangling an infant and a child above a ritualistic circle of flames and dancing bodies. The victims serve as sacrificial lambs to the causes of each side of the war when we see a demon eating more children in the bottom left corner. There is form of a weeping mother presiding over the disconcerting scene. Across from the maternal figure, Kanso depicts a forest in rare form, using green. The artist rarely used the verdant color which makes the timberland rather significant. It implicates the alarming impact that the fires and bombs had on the delicate environment of Lebanon.

== See also ==
- Lebanon (painting)
- The Split of Life
- 1977 in art
