= Dreamvision (paintings) =

Series of paintings by Nabil Kanso

DreamVision
- Artist: Nabil Kanso
- Year: 1980-81
- Medium: oil on canvas
- Dimensions: 200 cm × 175 cm (79 in × 69 in)

Dreamvision (paintings) is a series of 28 oil paintings made by Nabil Kanso in 1980–81. The subjects of the works in the series are two figures of a man and woman whose characters and relations are reinforced by figurative allusions to their surroundings.
