= Yaz =

Yaz may refer to:

== People ==
- Yazmith Bataz (born 1972), Mexican sprinter
- Yaz Mubarakai (born 1975), Australian politician
- Carl Yastrzemski (born 1939), American Hall-of-Fame baseball player
- Mike Yastrzemski (born 1990), American professional baseball player, grandson of Carl

== Other uses ==
- Yaz culture, an early Iron Age culture of Bactria and Margiana, c. 1500-1100 BC
- Yaz-class river patrol craft, Russian Coast Guard vessels
- YAZ, IATA code for Tofino Airport in Tofino, British Columbia, Canada
- yaz, ISO 639-3 code for the Yakö language, spoken by the Yakö people of Nigeria
- Yazoo, an English synth-pop band billed as "Yaz" in the United States
- Yaz Pistachio, a female character from the comic strip Bloom County
- Yaz (drug), a brand name of the birth control pill ethinylestradiol/drospirenone
- YAZ, a programmer toolkit for development of Z39.50 clients and servers
- The Yaroslavl Motor Plant, formerly abbreviated ЯАЗ ("YAZ")

== See also ==
- Yazz (born 1960), pseudonym used by English singer Yasmin Evans
- Yaz Khan, a Doctor Who companion portrayed by Mandip Gill
- Yazz The Greatest, a stage name of American actor and rapper Bryshere Y. Gray
- The homophone Jazz (disambiguation)
