= JASA =

Jasa is a municipality in Spain.

See also Jasa Veremalua (born 1988), Fijian rugby union player for the Tel Aviv Heat

JASA may stand for:

- Japan–America Security Alliance, signed in 1951
- Journal of the Acoustical Society of America
- Journal of the American Statistical Association
- Jose Abad Santos Avenue, a major road, designated as National Route 3 (N3) in the Philippines.
- Perspectives on Science and Christian Faith, subtitled "Journal of the American Scientific Affiliation"
- Special Affairs Department (Malay: Jabatan Hal Ehwal Khas, JASA), a defunct government department in Malaysia.

== See also ==
- Jassa, a genus of crustaceans
