= Hiroshima Nagasaki One-Minute =

Series of paintings by Nabil Kanso

Hiroshima 49 Seconds
- Artist: Nabil Kanso
- Year: 1978
- Medium: oil on canvas
- Dimensions: 3 m × 5 m (120 in × 200 in)

Hiroshima Nagasaki One-Minute is the subject of two mural-scale paintings made by Nabil Kanso in 1978–79. One is titled 49-Second (Hiroshima) done in oil on canvas measuring 3 by 5.50 meters (9.8 ft × 18.0 ft), the other 11-Seconds (Nagasaki) oil-on-canvas triptych measuring 3 by 4.60 meters (9.8 ft × 15.1 ft) center, and 2.75 by 1.32 meters (9.0 ft × 4.3 ft) each side.
