= Jazz Turner =

British paralympic sailor (born 1998)

Jazz Turner (born 8 July, 1998) is a paralympic sailor and wheelchair user who competes in the Hansa 303, and the RS Venture Connect SCS classes. In 2025 she created Project Fear in which she set out to circumnavigate the British Isles and Ireland solo and unsupported on 2 June 2025 and succeeded on 30 June 2025.

Turner sailed her 8.25 m (27.1 ft) Albin Vega yacht named the Fear, which had been specially adapted to suit her needs. The Fear is named after Turner's 'Project Fear', the name derived from the phrase "Face everything and rise." Turner has Ehlers–Danlos syndrome, diagnosed when she was 18. Her condition is stated to be terminal. Project Fear was also a fundraising exercise, Turner exceeded her initial £30,000 target, raising over £50,000 as she returned to Brighton Marina. The project raised the money for Newhaven and Seaford Sailing club's RYA Sailability group.

Prior to Turner's record setting voyage round the UK, her international sailing track record included winning the 2024 Swiss Cup in the two handed RS Venture Connect SCS class, and winning silver (2023) and bronze (2024) in the 'inclusive' category in the RS Venture Connect SCS World championships.

In February 2026 Turner was awarded the Yachtsman of the Year award for 2025 by the Yachting Journalist Association, presented at the Royal Yachting Association Dinghy and Watersports Show.
