= Othello (paintings) =

Painting series by Nabil Kanso

Othello: My Warrior, oil on canvas, 96X120 inches (244X305cm), 1985

Othello is a series of paintings executed in 1985 by Nabil Kanso. The subjects of the paintings are loosely based on Shakespeare’s tragedy Othello. The series comprises 60 paintings dealing with themes of love, race, jealousy, betrayal, and evil. They depict scenes embodying compositions of figural and metaphorical imagery that may be seen as visually reflecting the intimate and dramatic relationship between Othello and Desdemona, and the tense and uneasy relation that passes between and through Othello, Desdemona and Iago.

== Description ==
The Othello paintings depict a sequence of figural images with oil and acrylic on canvases and paperboards ranging in size from 30×40 inches (102×76 cm) to 120×216 inches (300×550 cm). The overtones are often conveyed with wide-rugged brushstrokes of black against a red background with areas of orange and yellow, and with figures and shapes of animals, humans, hooded faces, and monsters. It is pointed out that in the painting surface of the works on paper, "the brushstrokes seem even more aggressive, often giving the figures the immediacy of gesture sketches."

The physical substance of the paintings reflects a process of forming imagery that may correspond in form, texture, tone, and color to the subject it represents. The intense colors and violent movement of the brush seem to add emphasis to the nature of the subject. The embraces of the figures representing Othello and Desdemona are viewed by some as scenes that move "from tender and loving to confusion and rage." When the Othello were exhibited at the gallery space of a theater in Atlanta in 1985, the paintings were considered “too provocative” and were taken down the day after the exhibit had been hung.

The paintings in the series are divided almost equally in two parts. The first part consists of works often depicting compositions of naked human figures encountered in intimate situations heightened by the contrast of light and dark, and various sexual metaphors.

The second part contains about thirty canvases dealing with themes of intrigue, suspicion, and killing making direct references to the characters Iago, Othello, and Desdemona in Shakespeare’s tragedy. They reveal images of aggressiveness, intensity, and violence with webs of turbulent rhythm, whirling forms, and allegorical concepts as a means of conjuring imagery with layers of meanings and symbols that may visually reinterpret the intensity of events leading to Othello killing of Desdemona.
