= Lebanon (painting) =

1983 painting by Nabil Kanso

- Artist: Nabil Kanso
- Year: 1983
- Medium: oil on canvas
- Dimensions: 3 m × 8.50 m (120 in × 335 in)

Lebanon is a mural size painting by Nabil Kanso depicting the Lebanese Civil War in a scene invoking the spirit and character of the people in the midst of horror and violence gripping the country. Amid the scene of chaos and devastation, two central figures reach across toward each other symbolically to represent the appeal for unity in defiance of the forces of division, destruction, and terror.

== Description ==
Painted in oil on linen and completed in 1983, the painting Lebanon measures 28 feet (8.5 meters) long by 10 feet (3.0 meters) tall. Its composition delineates three sections. At the center, two leaping female figures reach toward each other, almost touching. They are within grasp of a tiny pearl of white green light at the center of the canvas. In the foreground plane forming the base of the two converging figures, an appealing mother carrying a child appears bursting out from a torched pyramidal structure serving to balance and heighten the overall impact of the central scene.

To the right side of the canvas stands a woman with her arms outstretched upward against an ascending perspective of a scene of devastation and destruction with scorched buildings and the gushing of human and animal suffering. They are presented as metaphors for the destruction besetting Lebanon and its capital city Beirut. The right foreground is occupied by two lamenting women with hands over their heads and one covering the eyes of a child.

The left section of the painting draws focus on the figure of what appears like a Druze sheikh steering out from the picture plane with a desperate calling. He is flanked on his left by a roaring horse and in front of him lies a fallen maiden wrapped with the flag of Lebanon behind protruding dark fists shaped like crawling tentacles. Above him, a wingspan bird covering a half-hid sun hovers over the contour of trees projecting flames that encircle infants floating around the arc of wide arms flung by a pleading figure underneath.

=== Background ===
During the Lebanese Civil War which broke out in 1975 and raged for 15 years with unabated violence killing more than 100,000 with many more injured and destitute, Kanso had made several trips to his native war-torn land. Throughout the period of the conflict, he executed a wide range of major paintings on the Lebanon war whose portrayal and theme evolved to universal expressions on human brutality and suffering. The paintings constitute a major part of The Split of Life interrelated series comprising works dealing with contemporary themes of war realized on large scale format. Among the works in the Split of Life are the series Vietnam (1974), Lebanon (1975–1990), One Minute: Hiroshima and Nagasaki (1978–79), South Africa (1979–80), America 500 Years (1989–91), Living Memory(1992–94).

In subject matter and technique, Lebanon 1983 painting reflects Kanso's expressionist figural style in the use of broad brush strokes with intense colors and symbols conveying his socio political ideas. The character and composition of the painting reflect Kanso's elaborate rendering of large groups of figures as part of a continuum of victims of violence painted on large scale canvases depicting grim scenes with aggressive and apocalyptic imagery aimed at engaging the viewer and bringing attention to the horror and devastation of war. The work makes reference to a number of 19th and 20th paintings rooted in expressionist, romantic, and symbolist works such as those Goya, Géricault, Delacroix, Munch, Picasso, and Orozco.

== See also ==
- The Split of Life
- The Vortices of Wrath (Lebanon 1977)
- Lebanon Summer 1982
