= Electronic Poet =

Sculpture in Portland, Oregon

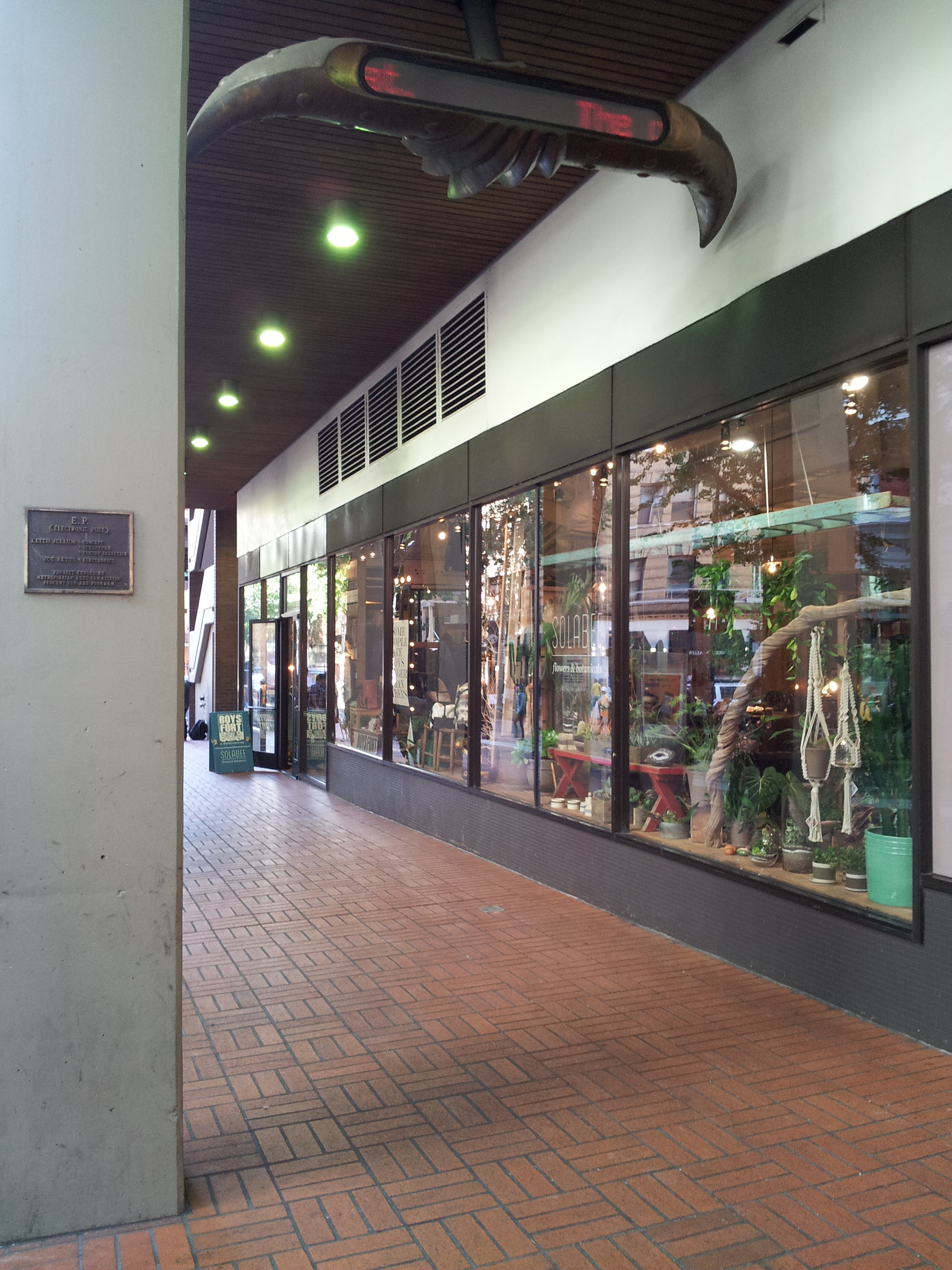
- The sculpture in 2014
- Artist: Keith Jellum
- Year: 1984
- Type: Sculpture
- Medium: Bronze, LED light board
- Dimensions: 0.25 m × 1.3 m × 0.51 m (10 in × 52 in × 20 in)
- Location: Portland, Oregon, United States; 45°31′11″N 122°40′54″W
- Owner: Parking garage at Southwest 10th and Yamhill; City of Portland and Multnomah County Public Art Collection courtesy of the Regional Arts & Culture Council

Electronic Poet, also known as E.P. (Electronic Poet), is an outdoor 1984 sculpture by Keith Jellum, located above the sidewalk on Southwest Morrison Street, between 9th and 10th Avenues in downtown Portland, Oregon. The abstract piece is made of bronze and an LED light board which displays poems programmed in a loop. It is administered by the Regional Arts & Culture Council.

== Description ==
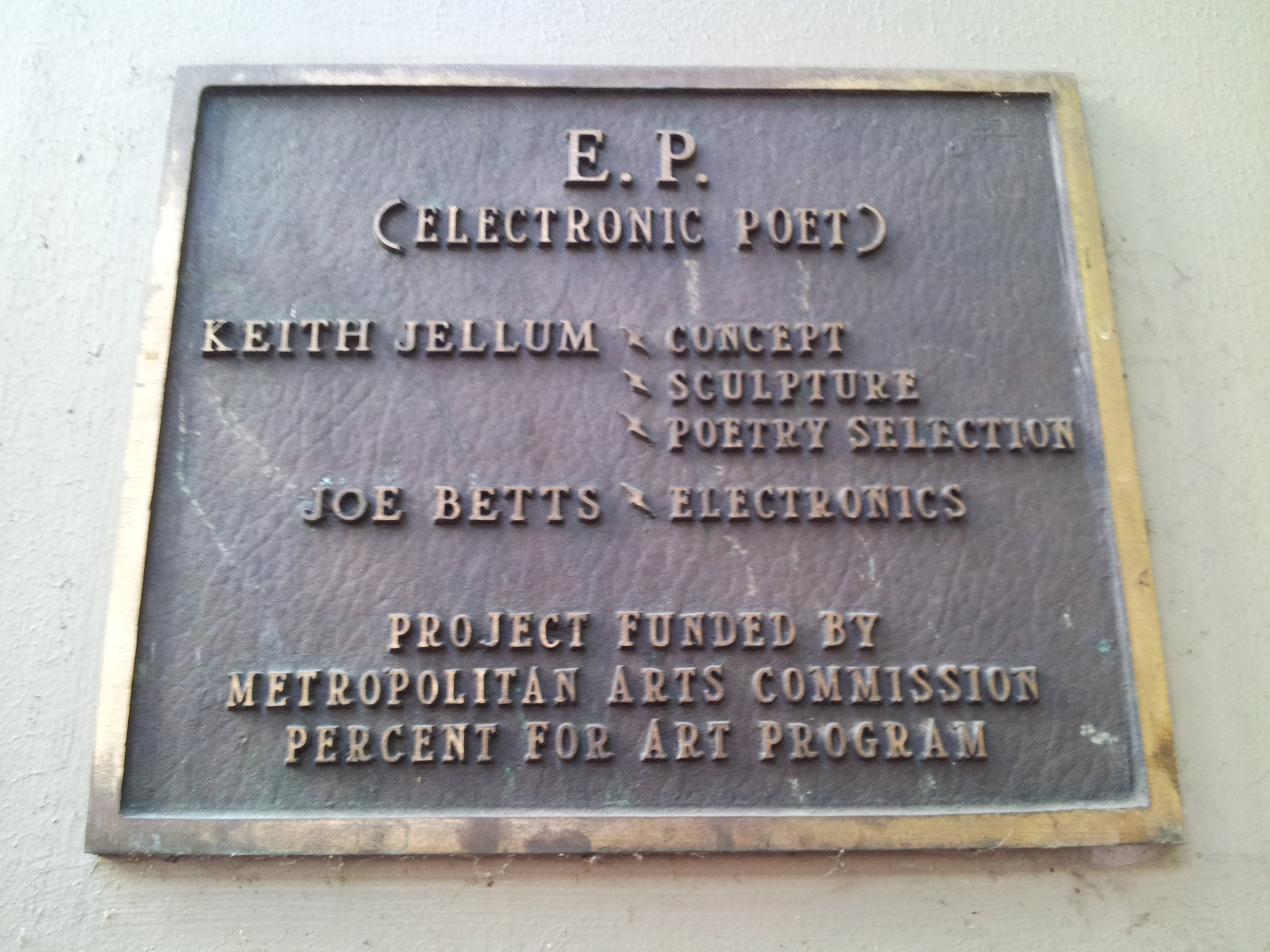
Plaque for the sculpture

The sculpture measures 10 inches (0.25 m) x 52 inches (1.3 m) x 20 inches (0.51 m) and is made of bronze and an LED light board. It displays curated collections of poems programmed in an "evolving" loop, intended to be rotated every six months. Selections of Jellum's favorite poems from around the world have featured American poets born before 1990, European, Native American and Northwestern poets, and Oregon place names, among others. The artist wanted to create "opportunities for moments of reflection within the urban landscape".

The Smithsonian Institution categorizes the sculpture as abstract. Smithsonian lists the parking garage at the intersection of Southwest 10th and Yamhill as the work's owner, while 'cultureNOW' says it is part of the City of Portland and Multnomah County Public Art Collection courtesy of the Regional Arts & Culture Council. Electronic Poet was funded by the city's Percent for Art program and is administered by the Regional Arts & Culture Council.

== Reception ==
"Dr. Know" (Marty Smith) of Willamette Week emphasized that the sculpture does not compose the text it displays and said its six-month rotation schedule "does not appear to be religiously observed". Of the work's introduction, in the form of the text "I am E.P." being displayed approximately every ten minutes, Smith hypothesized: "Since E.T. the Extra-Terrestrial came out in 1982, possibly the Poet’s name was a play on the then-recent sci-fi blockbuster about another technologically advanced being with a wide, flat head. Possibly, but I hope not." The sculpture has been included in walking tours of Portland.

== See also ==
- 1984 in art
- Digital art
- Digital poetry
- Electronic literature
