= Time Suspended in Space (South Africa) =

1980 painting by Nabil Kanso

- Artist: Nabil Kanso
- Year: 1980

Time Suspended in Space is the title of a mural-size painting on apartheid in South Africa painted by Nabil Kanso in 1980. It is oil on canvas measuring 3.65 X 5.50 meters (12 X 18 feet).
