= Apocalypse Series (Kanso) =

Painting series by Nabil Kanso

Apocalypse: Beams of Light, mixed media on paper, 188×114 cm (74×45 inches), 1984

The Apocalypse Series encompasses 125 works consisting of 75 paintings and 50 drawings created between 1982 and 1984 by Nabil Kanso. The subjects of the works in the series are based on the Revelation of Saint John the Evangelist. The colors of this painting are somber, suggesting richness and heaviness, while the repetitive geometry of the shapes suggest apocalyptic inevitability. In Peran Erminy's article, The Apocalyptic Paintings of Nabil Kanso, he clearly states that Kanso's paintings portray our world today. He states that our world is constantly surrounded by violence and people feel vulnerable. The aggression one has can ultimately lead to a break out in war where the world will be doomed. Kanso's paintings reflect the path we are taking as a world. People today are quick to act upon threats leading us into a world that is ruled by war. This will be the hell on earth made by none other than human beings themselves. Kanso has a strong, intense effect on his audience's feelings and emotions. Kanso's work is dark and sometimes frightening, conveying how it is relevant to the scary obstacles of today's world. Our society seems to be stuck on depressing violence and aggression and if continued on this path, will only continue to result in tragic wars.

== Painter ==
Apocalyptic Painter, Nabil Kanso was born in Lebanon. In recent years, the city was in a civil war that led to destruction and human suffering, however he had fond memories of his childhood. In the other hand, in 1958, during the civil war schools were forced to shut down. There wasn't much to do’ Kanso occupied his time making sketches that captured his interest. Kanso's first contact with art was images of angels painted in high ceilings, Mexican art works and other artists from East and West. While witnessing a shooting, is when Kanso had desire to move to America. After five years he moved to New York and enrolled himself in NYU to study Arts and Philosophy. In 1971, Kanso had his first solo in 76th Street Gallery. In spite of this many years later his apocalyptic series of paintings would end up in storage.
