= America 500 Years =

1988–1991 paintings by Nabil Kanso

Birth 1776, oil on linen, 3.65 by 5.50 meters (12.0 ft × 18.0 ft), 1989–1991

America 500 Years is the title of a series of paintings created in 1988–1991 by Nabil Kanso in commemoration of the 500th anniversary of the discovery of America. The works in the series base their subjects on historical events in the Americas over the course of five centuries.

== Description ==
America 500 Years series of paintings comprise a wide range of works including 9 mural-scale paintings executed in oil applied in rhythmic succession of vigorous brushwork infusing patterns and textures of varying density with intense tones of predominantly blue-black figures set against a combination of orange, red, and yellow ground. The compositions divide the canvas space into distinct sections within a planar layout constituting the basis for constructing a scene of separate parts offering variations of viewpoints in their contrast between subject matter and technique. The pictorial organization conveys a volumetric presence of highly condensed images in juxtaposed planes expanding their irregular shaped boundaries near the top of the canvas. The relation between them is important for an overall understanding of the picture and its meaning.

== Paintings in the series ==
1 – Discovery measuring 3.65 meters (12.0 feet) tall and 4.50 meters (14.8 feet) wide depicts the first landing of Christopher Columbus in the New World in a scene divided in two parts corresponding to two worlds, one posed by the arrival of Columbus, the other inhabited by natives. At the forefront of the right section stands a figure representing Columbus with a fierce look resting one hand on his sword, the other raising the cross. A silhouetted figure rises behind him with one arm raised and one stretched toward two sails above an assemblage of figures and objects that include a rearing horse, a figure in body armor, a mariner's compass, gunpowder and cannons alluding to some of the equipments and instruments brought by Columbus. The left part depicts an eagle and a group of figures that may represent the Taíno or Arawak natives, referred by Columbus as Indians.

2 – Encounter 3.65 by 5.50 meters (12.0 ft × 18.0 ft) depicts a scene reflecting the encounter between Hernán Cortés, the Spanish conquistador and Montezuma, ruler of the Aztec Empire. The scene entails two sections separated by a V-shaped space formed by the intersecting fall of a figure warrior and an eagle as a metaphor for the Aztec fallen eagle. The right plane shows a dominant figure personating Cortés with a steering look reaching for his sword drawn over two struggling figures. He leans backward upon a female figure representing his interpreter and mistress known as la Malinche. The upper area shows a screaming figure with wide-flung arms arching a wild-looking horse above the figures of a priest and a soldier. The left section depicts a figure representing Montezuma holding a flower necklace. His posture orients a triangular shaped plane fitted with a group of figures, a Serpent and objects with symbolic forms.

3 – Covenant 3.65 by 5.50 meters (12.0 ft × 18.0 ft) depicts a scene based on the subject of the arrival in America of the early settlers known as the Pilgrims who wrote the governing Compact aboard the Mayflower ship that landed at Plymouth. The painting's two sections are parted at the top center by a red-yellow sun amid a whirlwind of pendulous shaped forms extending themselves over the entire picture surface. At the top right side, dripping lines around the sun seem to give shape to the sail of a ship and overlap three joined figures that may refer to the signatories of the Covenant. Below them are thrusting figures reflecting natives appear with offerings such as plants and staples. The lower forefront shows a clergyman above a female figure leaning backward and holding in her hand a torched broom in flame alluding to the Salem witch trials.

4 – Birth 1776 (3.65 × 5.50 meters) depicts a scene on the American Revolution and Independence in a composition that divides the canvas in two parts linked at the center by a massive tree extending its branches in all directions scattering a wild assortment of shapes suggesting "organic cells that seem to subdivide and float around the figures." A fearless eagle sits at the top against a background of red and white stripes reflecting the American flag in a space dotted with stars and an image of the Liberty Bell. The area along the sides of the tree trunk shows the faces of George Washington and Thomas Jefferson. The left and right sections are linked by the tree trunk in establishing a unified base line projecting forms of muskets and rifles.<

5 – Branching (3.65 × 5.50 meters), continues the motif of the tree in Birth 1776 with a tripartite scene on the war of liberation and independence in Latin America depicting a "ponderous tree-trunk that builds a pathway" throughout the picture. The structured planes are surrounded by light bluish space containing forms reflecting the faces of Simón Bolívar, José de San Martín, Antonio Sucre, Francisco de Miranda, Miguel Hidalgo, and José Morelos.

6 – Chains Under a Blinding Sun (3 × 5.50 meters) is based on the subject of slavery depicting a three-part scene reflecting dark blue figures within a compressed space of deep yellow planes under a partial view of a hazy sun. Long pendulous shapes with circumventing rings emerge from both sides and converge at the center with dripping lines over chained and struggling figures and symbols of enslavement, hanging, lynching, and torture.

7 – Bleeding Eagles (3 × 5.50 meters) bases its subject on Native Americans with a scene imparting various allusions, symbolism and contrasting elements. The composition sets intense dark blue figures inside two fire-red rectangular planes whose upper parts recede outward creating a wide V-shaped central section dominated by two fighting eagles. They span their wings in a crisscross formation scattering flying feathers over a grey-white space defined by bluish flowing forms outlining drawn faces of native chiefs Pontiac, Joseph, Cochise, Crazy Horse, Black Hawk, Red Cloud, and Sitting Bull. Above the chiefs' heads and across the upper plane, sweeping shapes of red strips with black-blue contours fuse with flowing lines of varying densities. They appear dripping over the entire image highlighting the movement and tension of the scene.

8 – North-South Split (3.65 × 5.50) meters deals with the subject of the American Civil War in a scene composed in three sections demarcated at the edges by a white-bluish space that seems to widen around the upper middle part with floating forms outlining on one side the face of Abraham Lincoln, and on the other, the faces of Robert E Lee and Stonewall Jackson. Their heads are turned toward the central image showing a female figure diving over a child falling between two opposing figures that personify the fighting between the Confederate and Union armies. The right side plane is occupied by dark-blue figures surrounded by circular forms of chains breaking and loosening within the organism of a compressed space. The left side shows figures, elements, and symbols reflecting some events that may allude to the Mexican–American War.

9 – Glimmering Dawn (3.65 × 5.50 meters) depicts a three-part composition with an atmospheric evocation of the twentieth century. It is suggested that "the attitudes and motions of the figures and forms appear defined by webs of fire-lit strings" descending from different directions with a focus at the top of the central section occupied by an umbrella shaped sphere conjuring the threat of an atomic explosion. White-blue strips flowing with figure forms surround the three sections.

== See also ==
- The Split of Life
