= Keith Jellum =

American artist (1939–2026)

- Born: February 15, 1939
- Died: April 19, 2026 (aged 87); Newberg, Oregon, U.S.
- Known for: Metal sculptures and weathervanes
- Notable work: Windship (1980)
- Style: Metallic art

Keith Jellum (February 15, 1939 – April 19, 2026) was an American artist based in Portland, Oregon.

== Works ==
- Mimir (1980)
- Electronic Poet (1984)
- Transcendence
