= Nabil Kanso =

American painter (1940–2019)

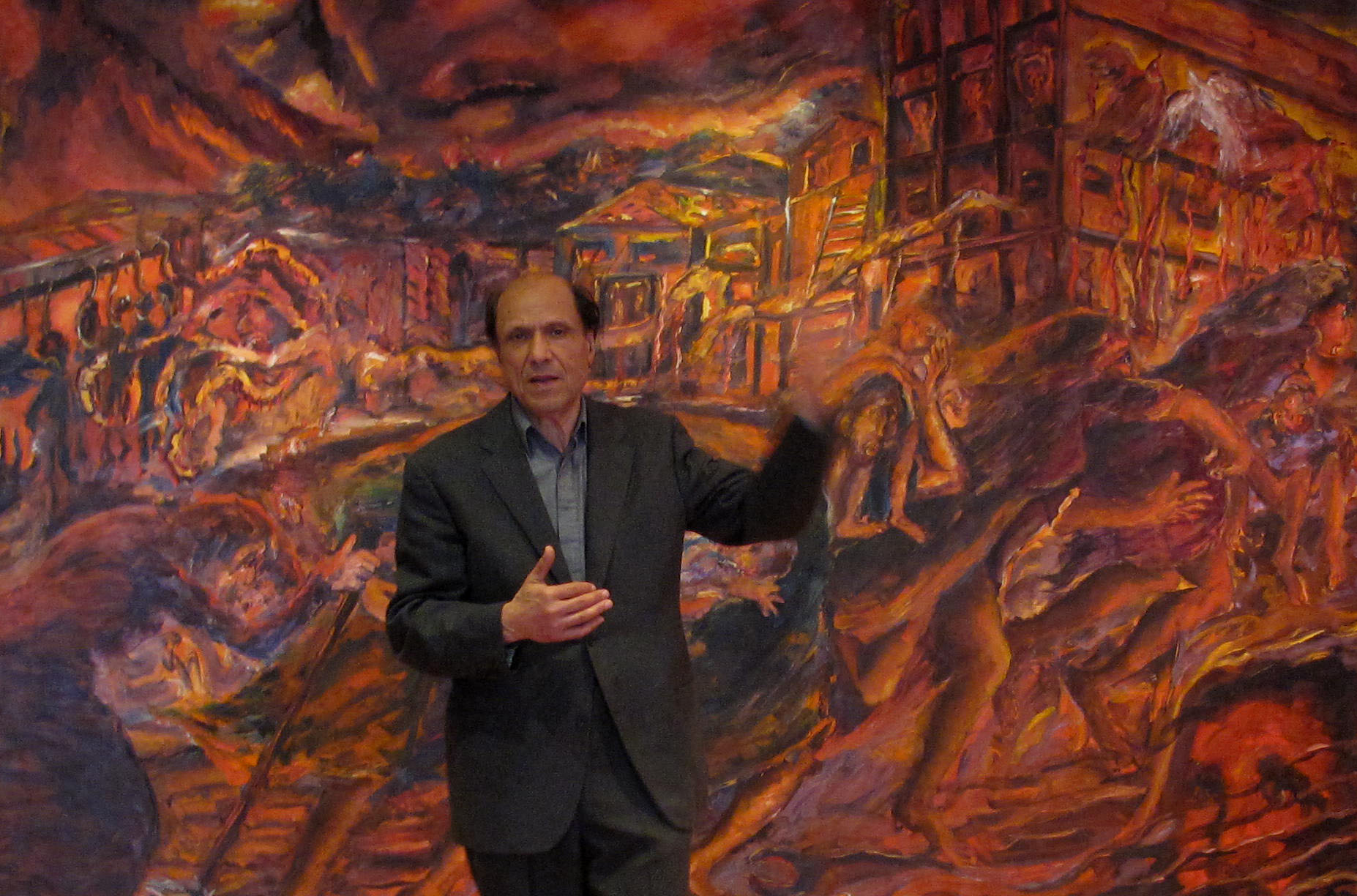
- Nabil Kanso
- Born: September 26, 1940; Beirut, Lebanon
- Died: 2019 (age 79); Atlanta, Georgia
- Education: New York University
- Known for: Painting
- Notable work: The Split of Life, Lebanon, America 500 Years, Faust
- Movement: Neo-expressionism, postmodernism

Nabil Kanso (September 26, 1940 – 2019) was a Lebanese-American painter. Kanso began his career in New York in 1968 during the start of the neo-expressionist movement. His works dealt with contemporary, historical and literary themes, and were marked by figurative imagery executed with spontaneous and vigorous handling of the paint and often done on large-scale formats. They reflected movement and tension embodying intense colors and symbolic forms addressing social, political, and war issues. The Vietnam War and the Lebanese Civil War profoundly affected the development and scope of his themes dealing with violence and war. His long-running Split of Life series encompassed an extensive range of enormous paintings depicting scenes of human brutality and suffering.

== Life and work ==
=== Early life ===
Nabil Kanso was born in Beirut, Lebanon on September 26, 1940, the sixth of eight children to parents Melhem Kanso and Munira Saab. His father was a successful linen merchant from Mukhtara. In 1958, a political crisis in Lebanon forced his school to close, and Kanso left the country. He attended Regent Street Polytechnic, and after graduation, moved to New York City. In 1966, he enrolled at New York University where he studied art history, philosophy and political science, receiving a B.A. in 1970 and an M.A. in 1971. He began painting in 1967.

=== 1970–1979 ===
In 1971, Kanso held his first one-man show at the 76th Street Gallery exhibiting 80 paintings and drawings in pastel, oil, and watercolor, with subjects including tropical landscapes, figures, and nude fantasies. Between 1971 and the end of 1972 he held a series of solo shows at the gallery. Although the exhibitions drew attention and reviews, the gallery went out of business in 1974, and many of Kanso's works from the period were placed in storage and eventually sold off or destroyed.

Between 1974 and 1979, Kanso took studios in different locations in the Carolinas, Atlanta, and New Orleans producing a large number of paintings. Among the works of this period are the series Vietnam (1974), Lebanon, which he began in 1975, at the outbreak of the Lebanese Civil War, One-Minute (1978–79) on Hiroshima and Nagasaki, the Jazz suite (1978–79) on jazz music, and Faust (1976–79) comprising over 100 paintings on Goethe's drama.

=== 1980–2007 ===
In 1980, Kanso established a studio in Atlanta and held several exhibitions. In 1984, he went to Venezuela where his works were shown in Maracaibo (1985), Caracas (1987), and Mérida (1987–88). Kanso displayed his works by covering the entire walls of the exhibition space with his paintings, which he called "the moving murals. The installation surrounding the viewer aims to convey the intensity between the reality of the subject matter and the actuality of painting, and reflect the artist's engagement with the canvases whose contents represent his visual life and relationship to conflicting Eastern and Western cultures and traditions.

Among the works of this period are the series South Africa (1980), Apocalyptic Riders (1980), DreamVision (1980–81), Lebanon (1982–83), Apocalypse (1984), Warring Wings (1984–85), Othello (1985), the Cluster Paintings (1986–1988), Leaves from the Theatre of War (1980s), The Dance of Salome (1988 and 1995), America 500 Years (1989–1991), Kuwait 1990–91, Living Memory (1993–94), Bosnia (1995–96), Portraits (1997–1999), Iraq (2004–2006).

=== Lebanese Civil War and Kanso ===
Critics have connected apocalyptic themes in Kanso's work to the Lebanese Civil War.

His Kuwait paintings show women suffering by losing a child becoming victims of war. "The victims," an art critic writes, "are the newborn torn out of wombs or clinging to mothers fleeing natural catastrophes or political disasters." It is noted by some critics that motherhood is important with Kanso's women; you see mothers at the moment of birth and in death holding children in their arms. The bars that recur from one work to another are sometimes placed at the opening of the woman's womb. The children suffer with their mothers as fire, storms, or ice intensifies the human situation. People of different religions are united in suffering and passion in these works of art. The noted lack of greens in Kanso's art marks his criticism of destruction of the environment. Nothing can grow during war. Flesh and blood appears to be everywhere. Water is for drowning, or for freezing. Icicles look like hairy insect legs or barbed wire. The rarely discerned sky sometimes reveals a glimpse of the forefathers like pale blue ghosts look down at their descendants.

=== War and apocalyptic themes ===
War and apocalyptic themes are central focus of Kanso's works since the early seventies. They provide the primary basis for his large-scale paintings responding to war and depicting apocalyptic visions. "Over the course of his career," an art critic writes, "Kanso created an extraordinary body of work dealing with war and apocalyptic themes that open up the visions of apocalyptic art." In dealing with horrors of war," another critic writes, "Kanso creates enormous paintings that serve as powerful weapons in fighting war." "Kanso declares war on war," reads a headline article on his Gulf War exhibition in Kuwait. The paintings show the whole gamut of human suffering and pain. The tortured language itself makes his work a universal manifestation of solidarity and protest against the proliferation of war. The canvases reveal a world permeated by a chain of chaos and violence in a hellish environment from which people are desperately trying to escape in order to survive. They find themselves immersed in an incisive and violent totality in which they are trapped.

The emotionally steering images draw the interest and involvement of the public in witnessing the violent events in scenes filled with pathos and tensions that reach extreme intensity. The depicted horror, one critic notes, present a form of interiority as for example in the interior of Afghanistan, Lebanon, Nicaragua, El Salvador, Vietnam. A total war, a pure war, one in which destruction is rallied to the absolute in conjunction with the corporeal and everything "else" is relegated to the status of target or cipher, a demarcation of the site of a bullet, bomb, or rocket. Hell is nothing but what it is. His paintings transmit images of the palpable reality of a world where pain, suffering, brutality, and destruction are everywhere. "They provide," a critics notes "a powerful indictment and denunciation of wars in the Middle East and Central America. Hence the mural-scale format enveloping an enormous space in projecting harrowing images as a consequence of war."

He expresses a juncture between his supercharged psyche and our anxiety and fear, provoking the explosion we see and feel in his paintings. "The intensity of the portrayed scenes heightens the atmosphere of fear and oppression", one critic remarks, "and awakens us or at least gives our dream an authentic vision of the final disaster." They open a window through which we contemplate and ponder on our precarious existence, beginning with the most intransigent and total fact of contemporary fear: total extinction. "They reveal, the never-ending darkness existing in an ephemeral glare right before bursting. The power of weapons is a terrible and absurd reality which mutates the space of human warmth." "The very idea of the possible destruction of the planet by nuclear war has totally changed our view of the world," observed Octavio Paz. "Meanwhile," a critic notes, "the world debates on perpetual small wars undermining the planet with ongoing disasters. The destruction and devastation of war are shown to us in the images of Nabil Kanso who Venezuelans came to know him as the Painter of the Apocalypse." He faithfully expresses orphanage, rage and the importance of living. "His mural paintings," a critic observed, "stand as a tribunal in interpreting and transmitting the voices that burst out of the canvases in a massive force, and plunge into an apocalyptic storm."

=== Kanso's style ===
In carrying out his work Nabil Kanso appears calm and quiet. But the light of fire in the paintings look like nightmares which he has to work through, often spending several months on one painting. Kanso's mural-scale paintings have been compared to Goya's 'Horror of War' and Picasso's Guernica. One critic wrote, "To stand in the central space surrounded by Nabil Kanso's 12-foot-high paintings is as close as you get to being in the middle of a fire. Using lurid oranges, yellows and reds, Kanso fills every inch of canvas with visions of violence and human suffering that rival medieval descriptions of Hell." Another wrote, "One painting went the entire length of the room, maybe 30 feet. I felt like a coward. It was almost impossible to look at the power and extravagance of these scenes, so I turned instead and looked at the faces of the other onlookers. In their faces were the reflections of the painted holocaust around us. I turned again to the painting which now entrapped is in a cage of feeling." Some critics have noted that "Kanso's highly expressive personal style evokes experiences and visions that reveal the inner essence of a reality lying beyond its external aspects". A view of a troubled world is portrayed in compositions whose imageries carry the art towards issues of human concern. They record intense, harrowing images of haunting themes voicing universal expressions on human brutality and suffering. In the opinion of some art critics "Kanso strong colors and powerful brushstrokes blend with the subject matter: world chaos." It is further noted that the battle against large formats cannot be won but with a strong determination and an absolute mastery of technique. These are inseparable and preconceived. The dynamic handling of the pictorial layout has a total identification with Kanso's topical matter. His powerful themes could in no way be handled with softer and milder style designed to make them palatable. By way of parallelism, Kanso's work is a harmony of style and subject matter.

=== The Split of Life paintings ===
Main article The Split of Life

The Split of life paintings comprise approximately 80 mural-size paintings executed between 1974 and 1994, and were the main focus of Kanso's work during the 15-year Lebanese Civil War that broke out in 1975. The works are characterized by the consistency and relatedness of their subjects and themes dealing with violence and war. In emphasizing the issues and bringing attention to the destruction, devastation, and suffering resulting from perpetual wars, Kanso took his paintings to various places in extensive exhibitions that traveled widely, particularly in Venezuela and Latin America.

The exhibition of works related by subject and theme projected a sense of overall-ness, a sense of one painting running into another. A reviewer of an exhibition in Maracaibo featuring works from 1976 to 1984, wrote "The synchrony and diachrony of the works cross a still point in which the show is no longer a total of 27 paintings, but only one." A critic viewed the works linkage at an exhibition in Atlanta as "a net, a polyvalence of economic, cultural, political, and sexual discourse." The net is not just a formal manipulation to tie the divergent contents of the paintings together, but "a very real device that grew out of the complex discourse of the paintings and ultimately from the poetics of the painter." At a 10-year survey in Caracas a critic wrote "the installation of Kanso monumental paintings projects an immense space charged with a high level of intensity closely connected to the tension and anxiety that we face in the world today. His apocalyptic paintings offers us a voyage to the hells of our time."

=== Studios ===
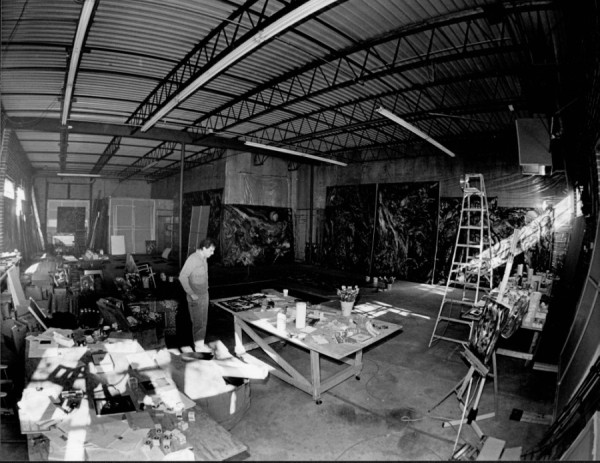
Kanso's studio, 1984

An art critic visiting Kanso's studio observed "canvasses rolled up in great numbers like mummies," and noted the connection between the linen cloth in Egyptian wraps and Kanso's own life. His father founded a linen cloth business in Mexico. Another critic wrote "walking around was like taking a tour of Dante's Inferno. With agitated brushstrokes and lurid oranges, Kanso has produced a roomful of frightening images reminiscent of late Goya's mural, all the more menacing because they are over 7 feet tall". A reviewer remarked "Startled is a weak word to describe my reaction. Every wall covered with paintings that reached the ceilings. In some places, the paintings were leaning against each other several deep. Others, lots, rolled up on the floor. It was hard to believe one man had done all of this. It wasn't just that the paintings were large but their content was brilliantly focused, it came from a seeming struggle going on in a landscape that appeared biblical."

=== Books ===
- The Split of Life: Paintings 1974-1994, NEV Editions, 1996, ISBN 1888536217
- Faust: Paintings 1976-1979, NEV Editions, 1997, ISBN 1888536152
- Othello 1985, NEV Editions, 1997, ISBN 1888536195

== See also ==
- List of Druze
