= Francis Hetling =

Fictitious Victorian photographer

'Francis Hetling' is a fictitious British pioneer of early Victorian photography, under whose name artist Graham Ovenden and photographer Howard Grey created images in the style of 19th-century photography. Some of these photographs were included in a 1974 exhibition at London's National Portrait Gallery and some images were sold.

In 1980, Ovenden and Grey were prosecuted on charges of conspiracy. The trial revealed that both were involved in the appearance of the Hetling photographs. Grey was responsible for the technical side of creating the photographs, while Ovenden gave them the appearance of early Victorian calotypes. Ovenden stated in court that the purpose was not to obtain a large sum of money, but to show the true calibre of those in the art business, who declare themselves experts without knowing anything, and those who profit by converting aesthetic values into financial values. Grey and Ovenden were acquitted by a jury. The trial was reported in the British media and has been analysed in academic and popular works on art forgery.

During the trial, the press reported that mothers of the models had expressed dissatisfaction with the way they had been posed by Grey during the photo shoot. In 2013, Ovenden was found guilty of charges of indecency with a child and a charge of indecent assault against a child.

== Hetling's photographs in the National Portrait Gallery exhibition ==
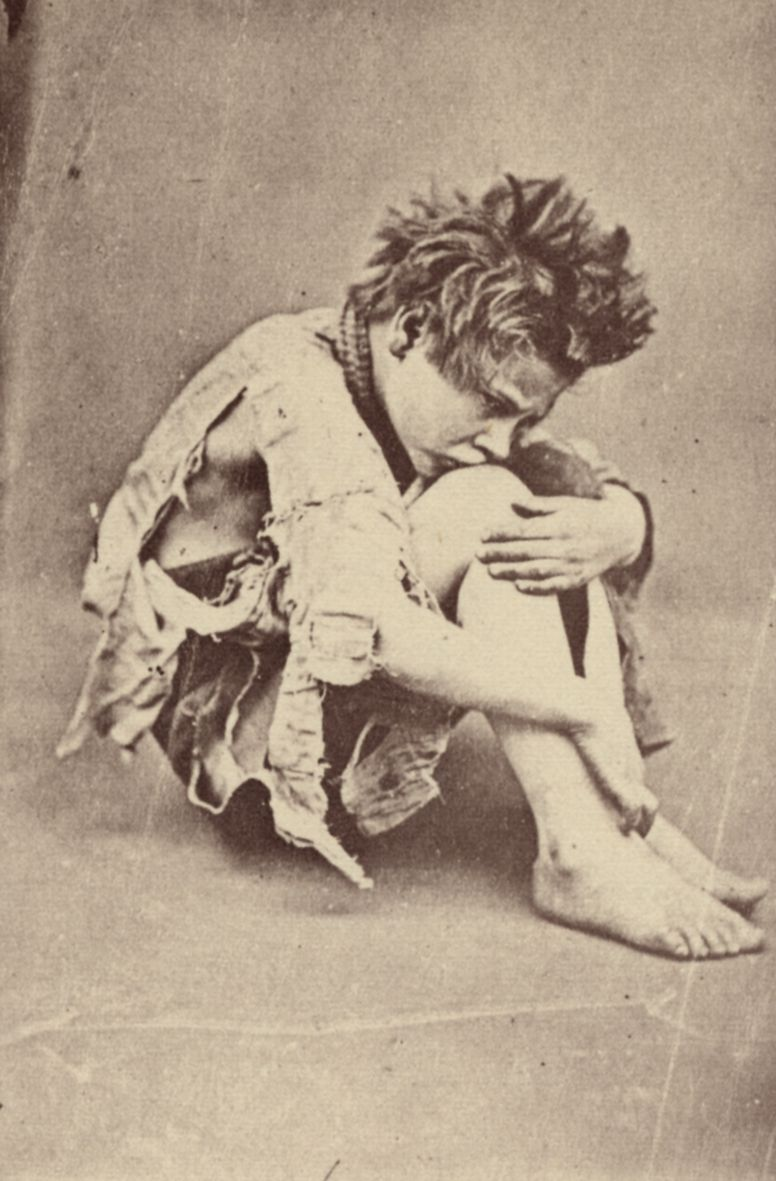
This photograph "Lost" (1871) was used on the poster for the 1974 exhibition The Camera and Dr Barnardo at the National Portrait Gallery and on the cover of the accompanying booklet

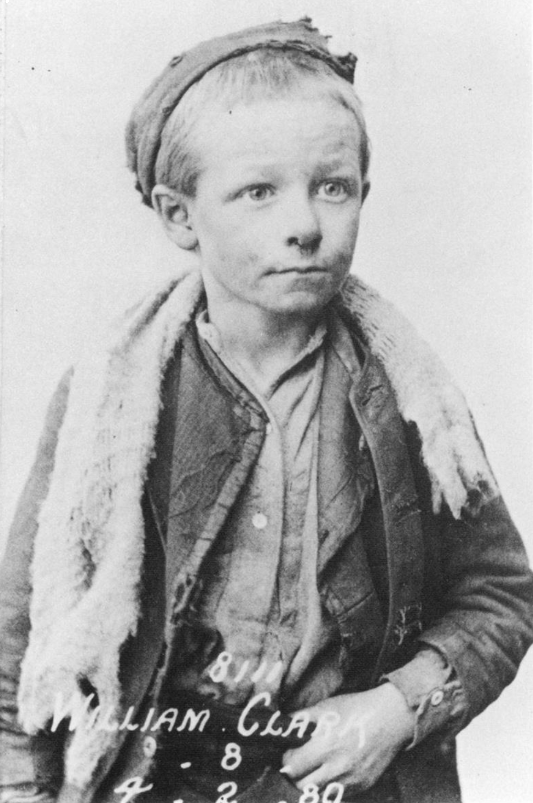
William Clark — the boy from Dr Barnardo's orphanage (c. 1880) from a National Portrait Gallery exhibition

In July 1974, the National Portrait Gallery in London held an exhibition titled The Camera and Dr Barnardo. The exhibition at the NPG's Carlton House Terrace site (Note: In 1971 the National Portrait Gallery, whose main site is by Trafalgar Square, took over the lower part of 13-15, Carlton House Terrace, using the space as storage and for temporary exhibitions from 1974 to 1980.) mostly consisted of photographs of orphans from Dr Barnardo's Homes, orphanages for street children. A total of 59,384 children passed through these orphanages from the time Thomas John Barnardo founded his first orphanage in 1867 until his death in 1905, and another 250,000 children were helped by him. Around 1870, Barnardo hired a professional photographer to take pictures of every child admitted to his orphanages. The photographs were kept in the orphanage albums and in the child's medical history. The National Portrait Gallery selected about 3,000 for the exhibition of the approximately 55,000 images taken between 1870 and 1905. The exhibition also included other examples of documentary photographs made in the same period, including the work of Thomas Annan and John Thomson; these were intended to provide a context for the fight against poverty in the Victorian era. (Note: Due to the large number of photographs presented in the exhibition, the organisers did not publish a full catalogue, only a 40-page booklet containing two articles and several photographs representing different sections of the exhibition.)

Seven photographs of Victorian street children taken by the previously unknown photographer Francis Hetling were exhibited. They showed eleven-year-old girls dressed in rags and photographed, as the newspapers put it, "under the railway arches at King's Cross". (Note: Marie-Anne and Mace Wenninger, in their book Secrets of [Art] Buying. Photography, published in 1992, claimed that Hetling's photographs depicted Victorian prostitutes.)

Joe Nickell, a professor at the University of Kentucky, argued in his book Camera Clues: A Handbook for Photographic Investigation, that for every photograph from Hetling's remarkable series of images of street children and underage prostitutes in Victorian London in the exhibition, there were some of the photographer's "alleged 'diary' captions". In fact, the owner, artist and expert on Victorian photography Graham Ovenden submitted the images to the National Portrait Gallery exhibition, telling their representatives that Francis Hetling had photographed "poor Victorian street children in the north of England". The names Ovenden gave them were allegedly taken from Hetling's diaries, which he claimed to have seen in person. Esther Inglis-Arkell, in an article on the Gizmodo website, reconstructed the photographer's activities somewhat differently: Hetling was an amateur photographer and kept a personal journal while shooting. He travelled around London photographing orphans at Barnardo's orphanages. She found that although street children were fashionable subjects for photographs in the second half of the 19th century, Victorian Britons liked staged images of street children. Often, children from wealthy families were dressed in fake rags by photographers and photographed in the countryside.

Exhibition organisers claimed that Hetling's photographs dated back to the 1840s. These photographs caused a stir among collectors because most images from this early period in the history of photography depicted members of the wealthy classes. Images of the urban poor were virtually unknown in these early years. Hetling's photographs, on the other hand, seemed to depict the poverty and squalor of street children in the early Victorian era. They looked old and were made in brown tones, like other photographs of the time made using the then-popular process of calotype (the earliest process of negative printing on paper, popular from 1840 to 1851). Despite claims that these photographs were over a hundred years old, the paper had survived remarkably well. Art critics have noted realism and immediacy in Hetling's photographs, and a sophistication of vision that few thought possible at so early a date. Art historian Valerie Lloyd of the National Portrait Gallery also admired the photographs, but viewed them with suspicion.

In 1975, in his book The Invented Eye: Masterpieces of Photography 1839–1914, English art critic and photographic historian Edward Lucie-Smith ranked Hetling's work among the finest of the pre-World War I period and even included a brief profile of the Victorian master:

Francis Hetling (b. 1799 – d.?). Hetling made his first photographs in 1844. His work has been carefully catalogued and indexed since 1846. He used primarily, but not exclusively, the calotype process.

== Disclosure ==
=== Disclosure versions and forgers' identities ===
In 1978, a scandal erupted. In November of that year, the British newspaper The Sunday Times published an article by its columnist Magnus Linklater in connection with the four-year-old exhibition. In December of the same year, it was reprinted in full by the American newspaper The Washington Post. As it turned out, even then a woman recognised a child she knew in one of the photographs on display, allegedly taken by Hetling in the 19th century. The author of an article in the 16-volume The Encyclopedia of Collectibles, Harvey Zucker, stated that "the so-called waif was recognised by a friend of her mother's as a living 11-year-old from the suburbs". There are articles in which the author tries to avoid specificity in describing the event: "someone recognised the young girl who had been the model". In contrast, the Daily Mirror of 20 November 1978 gave the name of the identified girl and where she lived — Joanna Sheffield from Twickenham and used her photograph on its front page. It noted that the children in Hetling's photographs were shown in erotic poses. The photographs of Sheffield dressed in rags were taken when she was only eleven years old. (Note: The same name was mentioned by the Washington Post and much later in the story of the identification of the child in the photograph (in his version, the daughter of a friend of the visitor's friend) by Joe Nickell. He added that the girl was a professional model at a young age. Paul Craddock confirmed the age and professionalism of the young model.) The English barrister, playwright, screenwriter and author John Mortimer told the story in a slightly different version and in relation to a different photograph. According to him, the mother herself visited the National Portrait Gallery, and she recognised in the standing dirty, barefoot and trembling on the doorway of a Victorian slum house child her own daughter, whom she had taken to school that morning in Battersea. Art historian Paul Crane recognised this model as a visitor to the exhibition. Art historian Paul Craddock wrote, that some visitors to the exhibition recognised the model, while others found the photographs "'wrong': the lighting and tonality were unconvincing, and the faces looked 'modern'." The visitor(s) did not inform the exhibition organisers that they had identified children they knew in the photographs on display. The Times reported that three mothers of the models expressed dissatisfaction with the way the children posed for Grey during the photo shoot.

It was later revealed that Hetling's work, and Hetling himself, were an elaborate and successful hoax made by two friends: the artist Graham Ovenden and the photographer Howard Grey. Grey had become noted for a portfolio of images of the last arrival of West Indian migrants at London's Waterloo Station before the Commonwealth Immigrants Act came into force in 1962. Since 1963, Grey was involved in various fashion and television advertising projects.

By 1974 Ovenden had become known for his pictorial portraits of young girls, and from the 1950s (while still in his teens) he began to create and publish his own photographs on the subject. In 1973, Ovenden published a book on the work of two pioneers of Scottish photography, David Octavius Hill and Robert Adamson. He was one of the first art historians to draw attention to the work of Victorian photographer Clementina Hawarden. In 1974, Ovenden dedicated a book to her, published simultaneously in London and New York. Other books published by Ovenden in 1974 included Victorian Children (co-authored with Robert Melville, 1972). During this period, Ovenden was active in group exhibitions, including Alice at the Victor Waddington Gallery in London (1970). He also showed his work in solo exhibitions, including the Piccadilly Gallery in London, where he exhibited regularly from 1970.

The end of the hoax was described by Dino Brugioni, intelligence analyst and former chief of information for the U.S. CIA's National Photographic Interpretation Center, in a 1999 book on photographic forgery. He claimed that the forgery was confirmed by detailed paper analysis of the photographs. It was from the story of Francis Hetling's exposé that Brugioni formulated his seven principles for analysing photographic paper.

Referring to Stuart Bennett's book How to Buy Photographs (1987), (Note: The artist, researcher and lecturer at Edinburgh College of Art, University of Edinburgh, Stuart Bennett, dedicated an excerpt to Hetling in his book How to Buy Photographs, published in 1987 in the Christie's Guides for Collectors series.) gallery owner and art historian Marie-Anne and her husband, watercolourist, printmaker, and sculptor Mace Wenninger, presented another way to expose the forgers: The paper used to print the images was genuine 1835 sheets with production watermarks (Joe Nickell also wrote about this), impregnated with the chemicals used to make calotypes, thus fooling anyone who saw the prints at the National Portrait Gallery. (Note: Unlike the Wenningers, who recounted his book, Bennett hesitated to answer the question of whether the paper prints were actually made from Gray's negatives, or whether Ovenden had the negatives in his hands. He wrote, "...there is no reason why Ovenden's 'Hetlings' could not have been printed from a small negative using an enlarger". Gray denied giving the negatives to Ovenden.) Bennett wrote that once the paper has been impregnated with the appropriate chemicals needed to make a calotype, there is little that can be done to prove a chemical forgery. The only means of proof was the exhaustive comparative analysis to identify trace elements present in Victorian chemicals but absent in modern ones. What led to the discovery of the forgery in this version, however, was that street children like those in Hetling's photographs could not pose with their hands raised in front of their faces while their clothes fluttered, since a calotype took at least two to three minutes to produce a negative on a glass plate.

=== Reconstruction attempts and the extent of Grey and Ovenden's responsibility ===
Isabelle Anscombe, a researcher in the history of photography, described in detail the process of making the photograph mentioned by Zucker. She wrote that one of the forgers (Anscombe does not name names in this fragment) who created the above photograph cut out a fragment from the negative of a modern, but in the style and realities of everyday life, early Victorian photography (which was not authorised by its author). The photograph originally showed a carelessly dressed, barefoot girl with long, dishevelled hair rolling a cart out of the depths of the interior of the photograph. Beside her was a brick wall that ran along the right side of the photograph. The forger enlarged the obtained part of the original photograph (at the bottom there is still an almost unrecognisable fragment of the one-wheeled wooden barrow pushed by the figure in the original photograph — the girl's hands are on it), then photographed it again, working on the original background. He then printed the photograph by calotype on "19th century paper" (this contradicts Dino Brugioni's claim). The forger then retouched the print and added false data with the initials of "the invented Victorian photographer Francis Hetling".

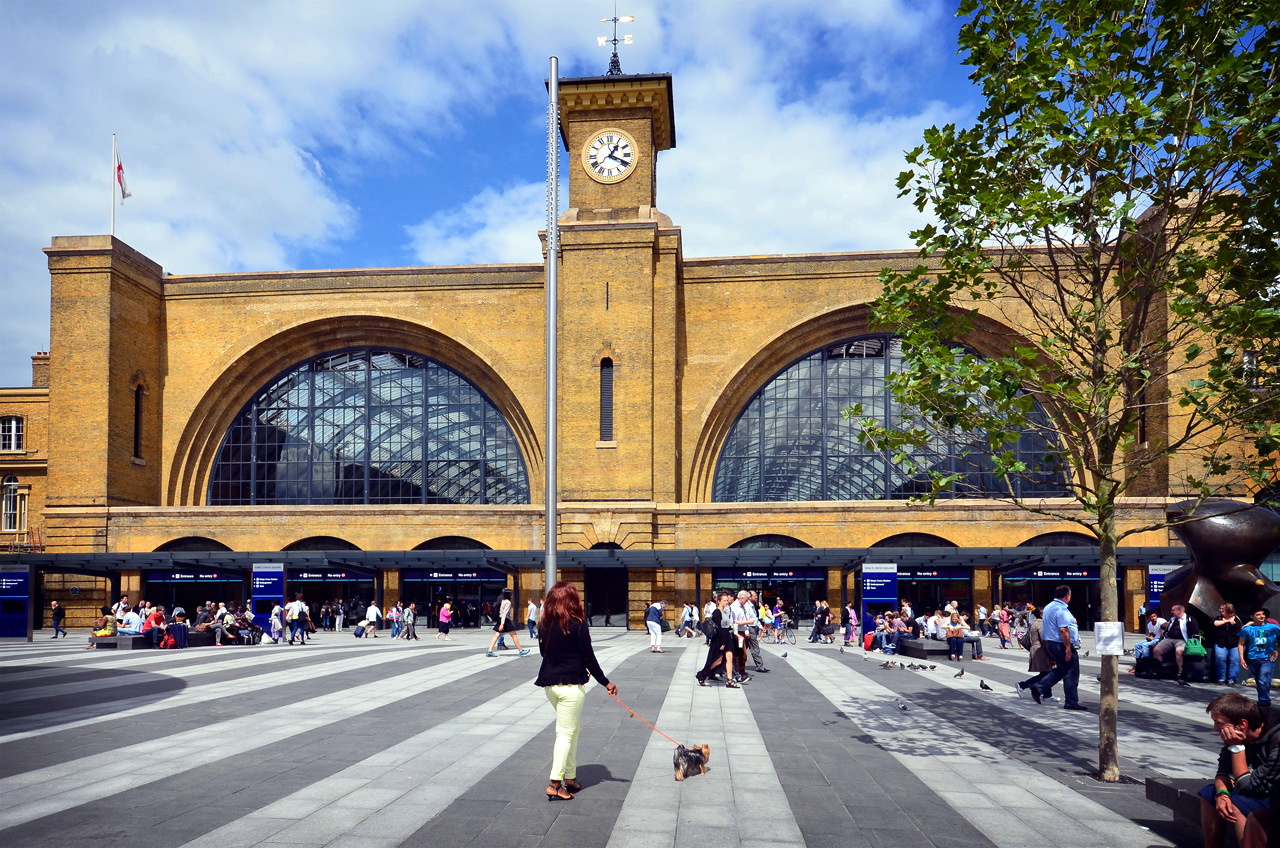
London's King's Cross station is the setting for the Hetling photographs

Art historians have concluded that both participants of the hoax were involved in the appearance of Hetling's photographs. Grey was responsible for the technical side of creating the photographs. He took the first photographs in early 1974, using child models who posed for him near King's Cross Station in London. Life magazine art critic Mary Steinbauer cited another London railway station, St Pancras, as the location for the photographs. In her article, she also cited images taken by Grey in the course of his work: Joanna Sheffield standing embarrassed in front of the carriage; pressed against the door of a brick house, her face covered; the photographer correcting the girl's clothes. Grey appreciated the booming market for Victorian-era photographs and set out to make pictures in this style. According to Steinbauer's version, the photographer made them in order to demonstrate his skills in the pseudo-Victorian style, and in all made more than a dozen black-and-white prints were made. Grey gave them to Graham Ovenden, an artist and collector of Victorian photography who had published several books on the history of photography.

John Mortimer, who defended Ovenden at the trial, had a slightly different view and interpretation of the sequence of events. He wrote in his autobiographical book Murderers and Other Friends: Another Part of Life, that Howard Grey had once photographed a child in such a way as to portray her as a Victorian slum dweller. In fact, the girl wore an old T-shirt, Grey had her rub dirt on her face and body, and she posed in front of a chimney on the roof of his studio. The photographer paid the young model £35 for the session. Ovenden later claimed that when he visited a friend, he found Grey in a depressed mood because of what he perceived to be the unsuccessful outcome of this photo shoot. The artist, he said, wanted to cheer the photographer up and prove that his work was not inferior in artistic merit to Victorian pictures.

There is another interpretation of what happened. According to the Washington Post and Stuart Bennett's version (echoed by Nickell and Craddock), Grey created several Victorian photographs of children to include in his portfolio. He gave some of the pictures he took to Ovenden, who was known to him as an avid collector of Victorian photographs.

Ovenden, without Grey's knowledge, manipulated the photographs given to him to look like calotypes made with pre-1860 technology. The "Francis Hetling's photographs" have been examined by photography experts at respected centres such as the National Portrait Gallery and Sotheby's auction house and have been found to be authentic. The anonymous author of a lengthy article in MD magazine wrote, that the photographs were not only convincing, but scientifically sound. Even chemical tests of the photographs failed to reveal any tampering. Ovenden then loaned them to the National Portrait Gallery for exhibition, stating that, based on existing expert evidence, they were genuine Victorian works.

Ovenden agreed to give art collector Erich Sommer some of Hetling's photographs in his possession at his request, but did not take money for them directly. Instead, he asked the dealer to buy some of his own work at whatever price he was willing to pay for the photographs. Among the defrauded art dealers was Harry Lunn of Washington, D.C., who in 1974 paid a British collector (not Ovenden personally) $2,400 for nine portraits of Joanna Sheffield in what he himself called a normal two-bit commercial transaction, claiming that in those days, unknown Victorian photographers' works were being found every week, and it would have been much harder to forge Talbot's or Cameron's [pictures]..."

When the hoax was exposed, Grey claimed that so called "Hetling's photographs" were a hoax. He admitted that he had made black and white prints and given them to Ovenden two months before the 1974 exhibition. He claimed not to know (he even claimed that the news of Ovenden's forgery came as a shock to him) that they had been sepia-toned to pass as 19th-century calotypes. According to him, the pictures had been included in the exhibition without his consent. When asked by the Daily Mirror about the eroticism of the pictures he had taken, he replied that he hated pornography. Grey went to Scotland Yard on his own initiative to give evidence to the Metropolitan Police's Art and Antiques Unit. (Note: That it was this unit that handled the case is also confirmed by the Year Book for 1980.) Ovenden could not even be contacted by the Daily Mirror as his home phone was out of order.

The Hetling story was on the front page of the Daily Mirror on 20 November 1978 beside a report on the Jonestown massacre in Guyana linked to the Peoples Temple sect.

== Prosecution ==
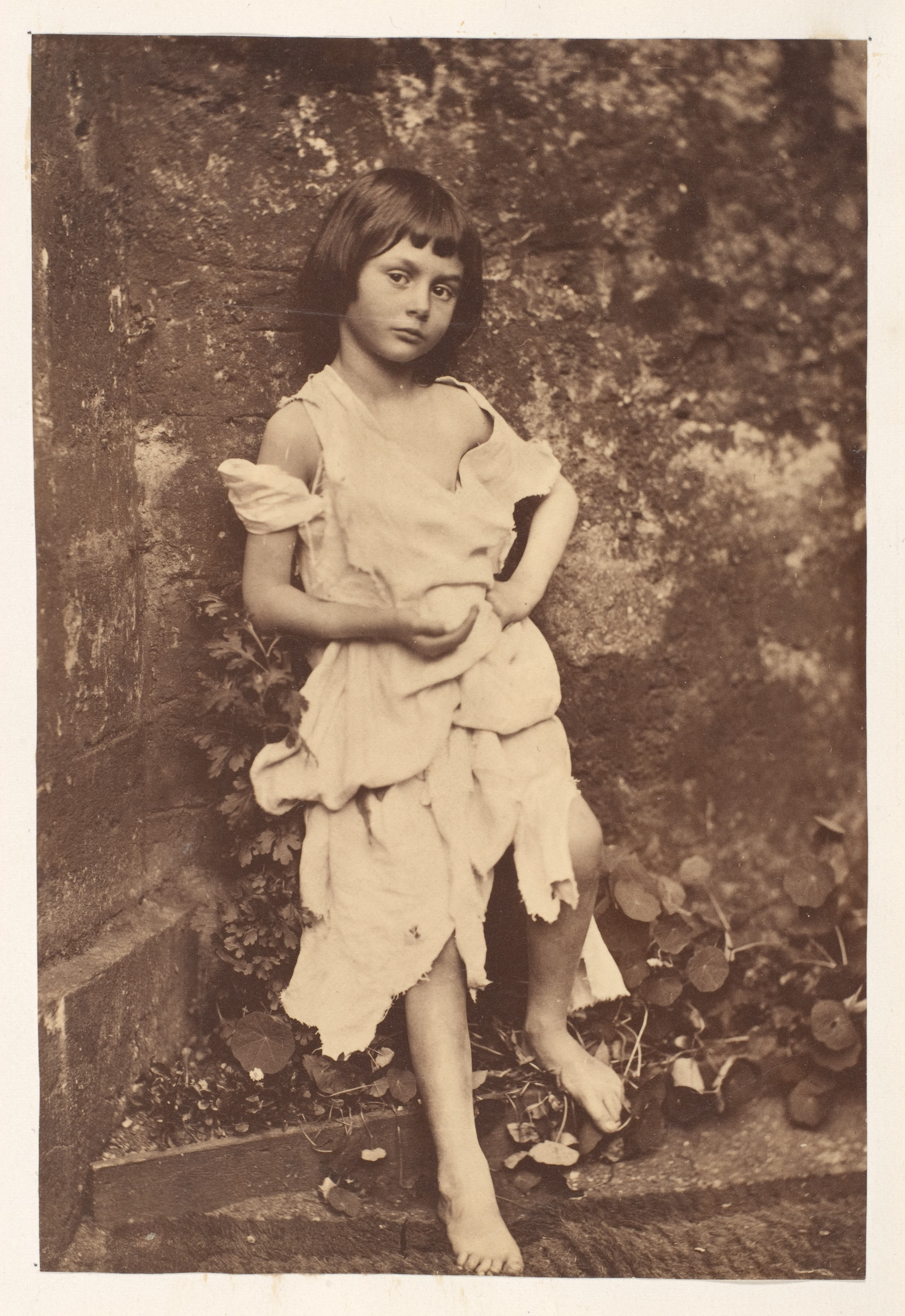
Charles Lutwidge Dodgson (Lewis Carroll). Alice Liddell as The Beggar Maid (staged photograph 1858 or 1859)

The complainant in the case of Francis Hetling's appearance and the forgery of images allegedly created by him was Erich Sommer, an art collector from Barnet. Alarmed by rumours about "his 'delightful' acquisitions", Sommer hired a researcher to track down Hetling and then contacted Scotland Yard. In court, he demanded compensation of £1,140, which he claimed he had paid to Ovenden for 19 photographs taken by a photographer who never existed. Some media have claimed that there were only ten photographs. The situation with the number of photographs is clarified by an article in The Times, which reported that in 1974 Sommer bought the first batch of 10 photographs from Hetling for £600, and that he bought a total of £1,140 worth of images from this collection. The official wording of the lawsuit was that Grey and Ovenden conspired between 1974 and 1978 to obtain private property by deception. Michael Kalisher, for the prosecution, stated that the forgery became apparent to Sommer when an article about the fake Victorian photographs appeared in The Sunday Times in November 1978.

The prosecution also alleged that Ovenden and Sommer once entered into an agreement whereby the artist would advise the collector and provide works for his collection for a commission. They also agreed to cooperate in the contract of photographs sale. John Mortimer, who defended Ovenden at the trial, said no such agreement was ever signed. A cheque written by Sommer in June 1974 for £1,140 was not for the purchase of Hetling's photographs, but for the purchase of Ovenden's own work. Howard Grey (then aged 38) and Graham Ovenden (aged 39) pleaded not guilty.

At a trial at the Old Bailey, London, in 1980, Ovenden did not deny making salt prints from photographs taken by Grey, and stated that he had conjured up Francis Hetling's name from nowhere. The purpose of the hoax, he said, was not to make money, but to show the true level of those in the art business, those who proclaim themselves experts without knowing anything, [and] those who profit by turning aesthetic values into financial values. The forger also stated that he wanted to demonstrate the art world's indifference to contemporary talent. Ovenden claimed: "...that living photography is a fine thing, not only when it entails age".

The defence at the trial insisted that Ovenden was such a prominent figure in art that the photographs would have been far more valuable if he had declared himself the author than if they had been the work of Hetling, a little-known Victorian. The defence also insisted that art works should not be treated in the same way as frozen carrots. The artist Peter Blake, a friend of Ovenden's, was present in the courtroom throughout the trial. Mortimer recounts in his book a curious episode in the trial: one of Hetling's works turned out not to be a photograph at all, but an incredibly realistic drawing of Ovenden himself. When the judge heard this from the artist, he expressed his doubts. Ovenden then painted another similar drawing to allay the judge's suspicions. Mortimer added that sometimes Ovenden would make a drawing and then photograph it.

John Mortimer characterised Ovenden during the trial as "small, bearded, blessed with every talent except modesty". Periodically, the artist would declare with a smile: "Great men humble themselves" or "Great men sometimes do things like that". The judge, Charles Lawson, was a "thoroughly decent judge", with "a ramrod straight back", a skin colour of "old claret", a "ready smile", and "a considerable amount of common sense". Nevertheless, he had little competence in matters of art. Several times he lost the thread of his arguments on aesthetic problems, and "the shorthand writer became too confused to continue her note of the evidence". During one session, the prosecutor showed a photograph by Charles Lutwidge Dodgson (Lewis Carroll), who was known in his lifetime as an outstanding photographer of children. Ovenden agreed that it was a valuable work of art. But when the prosecutor argued that Hetling's photographs had no value, Ovenden told him he was dead wrong. It was already known that when Hetling's photographs became known as Ovenden's work, the price for them rose higher than the art dealer had paid for them.

Charles Lawson described the trial as "one of the most interesting and unusual in his entire trial practice and in his entire career". The jury, according to Mortimer, was in a state of utter confusion at the time of the verdict. Counsel's closing argument was generally met with an explosion of prolonged hilarity in the courtroom. Grey and Ovenden were acquitted of the charge of "conspiracy to defraud". (Note: The only successful prosecution similar to this one that Mary Steinbauer could recall as of August 1981 involved a fraudster named George Shaw who was sentenced to prison in 1979 for selling five fake daguerreotypes to the North Western Museum of Science and Industry in Manchester for £1,000.) In evaluating this verdict, Mortimer argued that Ovenden had led the unsuspecting judge and jury away from the simple facts of fraud and theft to the aesthetics fields.

In the Encyclopedia of Collectibles the hoax was interpreted in the following way:

The pictures apparently were made as a joke that got out of hand. "The idea was to go the whole hog and produce a book of photographs by Hetling, than to have a great exposé at the end of it", claimed one of those involved. "My only regret about this whole caboodle is that we didn't in the end produce the book. It would have been beautiful".

Joanna Sheffield and two other named child models, the youngest 15, were photographed for page 3 of the Daily Express on 12 November 1980, described as "'waifs who were stars in court case".

As a result of the press coverage, prices for Hetling's works rose sharply, approaching £50,000. They had attracted the interest of Britain's oldest art dealer, P. & D. Colnaghi & Co. but Colnaghi declined to include them in a sale without further evidence of Hetling's existence.

== 1981 Victorian photographs ==
After the trial, The Connoisseur commissioned two more stylised photographs from Howard Grey in 1981 (Stuart Bennett wrote of three: two portraits of women and a "still life"). Grey's model this time was Isabelle Anscombe, author of a recent article in The Connoisseur about Francis Hetling. The magazine undertook this commission to demonstrate that it was possible to make new photographs that were physically indistinguishable from 19th-century originals, to show them to connoisseurs, and thus to challenge the foundations of the Victorian photographic market. The headdress in which Anscombe appears in the photographs appeared 20 years after the alleged date of the photograph.

A middle-aged woman announced at a public event at the Victoria and Albert Museum that she had found vintage photographs in the attic of her house. Grey's images were mixed with authentic photographs from the 1860s and 1870s, taken in the photographic workshop of Francis Frith & Co. The museum expert to whom they were given was convinced of their authenticity and judged them to be amateur photographs from the 1850s. The hoax was publicised by its organisers in the press and on television. At the Museum's request, Grey subsequently provided the Museum with a photograph of the Hetling, as well as a step-by-step account of how he took the photos for The Connoisseur. Grey used a modern Rolleiflex SL66 camera with a telephoto lens and black-and-white film from Ilford.

Stuart Bennett has reported extensively on the reactions of experts to the arrival of Grey's new photographs. According to The Times, the Victoria and Albert Museum said the photos "will be a welcome addition to its collection," while the National Portrait Gallery "expressed regret at not recognising the 'aristocratic features of the woman' in the portrait." Christie's South Kensington auction house estimated the photographs at $840 to $1,260, while another auction house, Sotheby's Belgravia, valued them at $63 to $110. The latter said they would be worth more if experts could identify the photographer. The London art dealer suggested that they were salt paper prints from a glass negative, which he thought dated from 1855 to 1857. He offered $330 for the two portraits. Mary Steinbauer reported that Grey's three photographs were shown to staff at the National Portrait Gallery, the Victoria and Albert Museum, Sotheby's and Christie's, and to dealer Robert Hershkowitz. No one thought the pictures were fakes; estimates of their value, according to Steinbauer, ranged from $80 to $600.

As of 2025, Grey's photograph of Isabelle Anscombe remains in the collection of the Victoria and Albert Museum. It is catalogued as Girl in a Cemetery). Salted paper print from a negative, 1981. Signed in ink on the frame, G. M. W. Inv. V & A Ph. 310-1981. Donated by the photographer in 1981". The museum's collection also includes another of Grey's photographs of foliage (foliage, V & A Ph. 313-1981) in Victorian technique and style, as well as a photograph of girls taken by Ovenden in 1974 (V & A Ph. 314-1981).

== 'Francis Hetling' photographs' features ==
External image
- | "Frances Hetling". Girl covering her face with her hand, 1974 (1840s are indicated in the exhibition)

Even as the forgery scandal unfolded, experts pointed out details that should have raised doubts at the time. The writhing girl in one of the photographs would have had to hold that pose for several minutes if it had been taken with a camera from the 1840s. This seemed physically impossible to experts. It was also noted that the girl in another photograph by Hetling looked oddly plump for a tramp. A photograph of a child hysterically covering her face with her hand has a strong effect on the viewer. He forgets that this girl, too, had to remain in this position for several minutes under the conditions of early photography. Anscombe also pointed out that our empathy with the child's terror in this photograph comes from the modern notion of camera intrusiveness, but there were no paparazzi in the 1840s. For these reasons, in her opinion, an expert trying to distinguish an original from a forgery should be wary of basing his conclusion on the emotional persuasiveness of the image ("photography is compelling because it claims a reality which is denied to all other arts") and must "rely mainly on a scientific understanding of photography". Stuart Bennett pointed out a number of minor errors made by the authors of the forgery, none of which alone could prove the forgery, but all of which together were convincing evidence of it:

One look [on the teenage prostitute in the picture] should ring alarm bells in the viewer's mind. Why does the girl have her hand over her face? Out of shame for her depraved life and to protect her identity from the camera? But the notion of the intrusive photographer is a modern one, unknown to early photography, and this apparent modernity in the ‘Hetling’ leads by deduction to even more conclusive doubts of its authenticity. Part of the photograph’s impact derives from the appearance of the little girl’s flinging her hands up as if to protect herself, but to get this effect in an 1840s or 50s calotype the pose would have to be held for at least two or three minutes, quite an improbable feat for a young street urchin. A closer look at this photograph also reveals a too-great resolution of detail for an 1840s calotype, while I for one am now suspicious of a too-rich ‘purplypink’ colour in calotypes, though on neither of these features would one be likely to brood unless suspicions had already been aroused.

Based on these considerations, Bennett recommended that in such cases the expert should follow his instincts, trace the origin of the photographs, analyse the accompanying documentation, and determine the method of making the photograph by comparing it to that of the time. He wrote at the end of the account of the forgery in his book, that the discovery in 1978 that the National Portrait Gallery was exhibiting Hetling forgeries was not based on the photographs themselves, but on the fact that one of the models was recognised by a family friend as being alive, well-fed and living in prosperity in Twickenham.

Mary Steinbauer had a different take on what Bennett saw as the forgers' mistakes. From her perspective, each of these "Hetling" photographs gives the viewer a hint that something is wrong with the photographs and that the girl is not what she appears to be at first glance. In one photograph, for example, the girl (standing barefoot in the doorway of a brick house in front of a closed single door, her left shoulder leaning against the wall and her shawl clutched across her chest) is wearing a ring, an impossibility for a Victorian street girl. She judges the "mistakes" in the other two photographs similarly. Brian Coe, curator of the George Eastman Museum, noted many such questionable elements and testified at the trial, that if these photographs were real, we would have to rewrite the history of photography.

Based on the Hetling photographs, Steinbauer proposed her own methods for identifying forgeries: analysing the lighting, focus, and reference marks on the negative, and using knowledge of the style of the period and the historical details that correspond to it.

In the end, experts recognised that the "Francis Hetling" case demonstrated the ease with which old photographs can be faked: "There is no historical photographic process that cannot be duplicated today", argued Isabelle Anscombe. The Hetling case undermined confidence in investing in the collection of old photographs.

== Aftermath ==
In 2013, Ovenden was found guilty of six charges of indecency with a child and one charge of indecent assault against a child; some of the charges involved claims that he abused children while they were posing for his pictures and related to incidents between 1972 and 1985.

== Hetling's work in pop culture ==
In 1993 British gothic rock music group Rosetta Stone released a compilation of their early work entitled Foundation Stones in the United States in conjunction with the American label Cleopatra Records. On the CD cover, between the band name at the top and the album title at the bottom, is one of the photographs exhibited in the 1974 The Camera and Dr Barnardo exhibition under the name of Francis Hetling, depicting a weeping girl with her left hand covering her face from others and her right hand holding the rags she is wearing. Behind her back is a brick wall, but to the right of her figure darkness opens up.

== Bibliography ==
=== Research works and non-fiction ===
- Anscombe, I. (1981). "Daylight Robbery? Exposing the shady side of 'Victorian' photography". The Connoisseur. No. May (vol. 207, no. 831). pp. 49–51. ISSN 0010-6275.
- Bennett, S. (1987). How to Buy Photographs. Christie's Collectors Guides. Oxford: Phaidon. p. 159. ISBN 978-0-7148-8036-5.
- Brugioni, D. A. (1999). "Spotting Fakes". Photo Fakery: the History and Technique of Photographic Deception and Manipulation. Dulles, Virginia: Brassey's. pp. 61–140. ISBN 978-1-5748-8166-0.
- Craddock, P. T. (1990). "7. Faking in the 20th century". Fake? The Art of Deception ed. Jones M. The Trustees of the British Museum. Berkeley, Los Angeles: University of California Press. pp. 235–246.
- Duthy, R. (1984). Investor's File. The market for nineteenth-century photography expands. The World as it was. The Connoisseur. pp. 110–114. ISSN 0010-6275.
- Haberstich, D. (1977). «Pictures: The Hill-Adamson Calotypes» David Bruce. «Hill and Adamson Photographs» Graham Ovenden. Vol. 10. Leonardo. p. 171.
- Hacking, J. (2018). "Francis Hetling". Photography and the Art Market. Handbooks in International Art Business. London: Lund Humphries. pp. 48–49. ISBN 978-1-8482-2148-2.
- "Graham Ovenden". Benezit Dictionary of British Graphic Artists and Illustrators. Oxford (USA): Oxford University Press. 2012. pp. 178–179. ISBN 978-0199-9230-52.
- Lloyd, V. (1974). The Camera and Dr. Barnardo. London: The National Portrait Gallery. pp. 10–16. ISBN 978-0-9040-1712-0.
- Lucie-Smith, Edward (1975). "Francis Hetling". The Invented Eye: Masterpieces of Photography, 1839–1914. New York: Paddington Press. p. 83. ISBN 978-0-8467-0040-1.
- Marchant, James (1901). "Barnardo, Thomas John". The Dictionary of National Biography. Second Supplement in Three Volumes. London: Oxford University Press. pp. 99–100.
- Mortimer, J. (1994). Murderers and Other Friends: Another Part of Life. New York: Viking. p. 260. ISBN 0-6708-4902-2.
- Nickell, J. (1994). "Historical Photo Mysteries. Originals, Copies, and Fakes". Camera Clues: A Handbook for Photographic Investigation. Lexington, Kentucky: University Press of Kentucky. pp. 30–53. ISBN 0-8131-9124-6.
- Ovenden, H. (1974). Clementina, Lady Hawarden. London, New York: Academy Editions, St. Martin’s Press. p. 112. ISBN 978-0-8567-0199-3.
- Ovenden, H. (1973). Hill and Adamson Photographs. Introduction by Marina Henderson. London, New York: Academy Editions, St. Martin's Press.
- Ovenden G., Melville R. (1972). Victorian Children. London, New York: Academy Editions, St. Martin's Press. p. 72. ISBN 978-0-9026-2063-6.
- Wagner, G. (1974). A Man of Tender Violence // The Camera and Dr. Barnardo. London: The National Portrait Gallery. pp. 3–9. ISBN 978-0-9040-1712-0.
- Wenniger M. A., Wenniger M. (1992). "10. Cautionary and Guiding Remarks for Collectors". Secrets of buying art. Photography. Cincinnati, Ohio: Betterway Books. pp. 149–154. ISBN 1-5587-0250-4.
- Zucker, H. (1978). Photographs // The Encyclopedia of collectibles (16 Volume Set) by Andrea DiNoto (Editor). Chicago, Illinois: Time-Life Books. pp. 16–31. ISBN 0-8094-2763-X.

=== Media ===
- Trachtenberg, Alan (Summer 1975). "The Camera and Dr. Barnardo". Aperture. pp. 68–75. ISSN 0003-6420.
- "Photography as art: A Burgeoning Market for Collectors". MD. Vol. 25, no. 9. September 1981. pp. 80–89.
- Gibb, F. (30 October 1980). "Faked photographs taken in 1970s". The Times. p. 5. ISSN 0140-0460.
- Fallows, George (20 November 1978). "Fake Pictures Probe". Daily Mirror. p. 1. ISSN 0307-0204.
- "It's Not What You See". Freedom. Vol. 40, no. 12. 30 June 1979. pp. 10, 16.
- Linklater, M. (10 December 1978). "Faking Out the Collectors". The Washington Post. ISSN 0190-8286.
- Famighetti, Robert, ed. (1979). "Fake photos". 1980 Year Book: Covering the Year 1979. New York: Macmillan Educational Corporation. p. 446.
- Steinbauer, Mary (August 1981). "Camera at Work: the puzzling case of the faked photographs". Life. pp. 10–14. ISSN 0024-3019.
