= Wellow (Somerset) railway station =

Former railway station in England

Coordinates: 51.3214°N 2.3760°W

Wellow
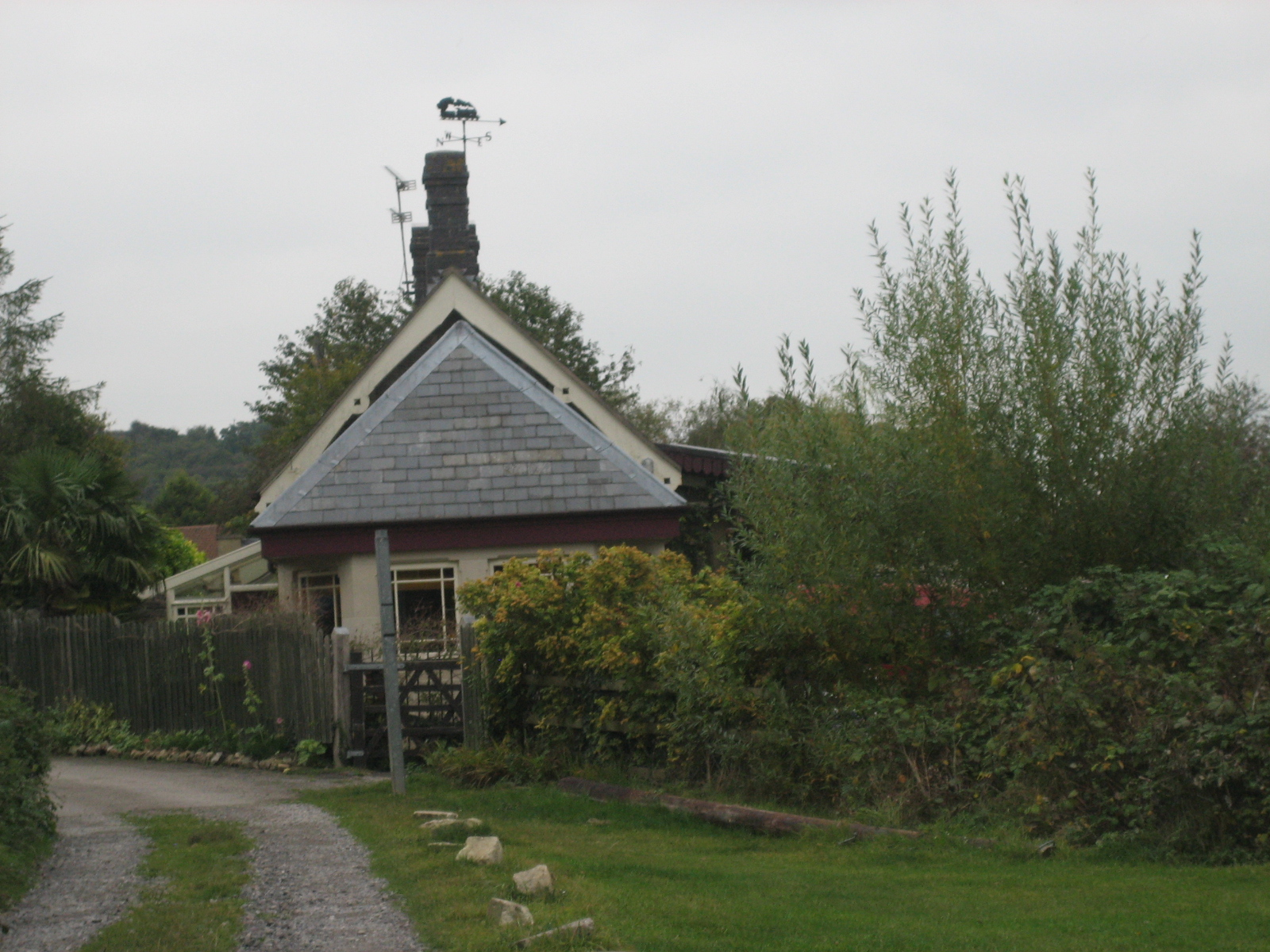
- Wellow station, in private residential use, September 2007

General information
- Location: Wellow, Bath and North East Somerset, Somerset; England
- Grid reference: ST739581
- Platforms: 2

Other information
- Status: Disused

History
- Pre-grouping: Somerset and Dorset Railway
- Post-grouping: SR and LMSR; Western Region of British Railways

Key dates
- 20 July 1874: Station opened
- 7 March 1966: Station closed
Location

Wellow railway station was a station on the Somerset and Dorset Joint Railway at Wellow in the county of Somerset in England. Opened on 20 July 1874, the station consisted of two platforms, a goods yard and sidings, controlled from an 18 lever signal box.

The station closed to goods in 1963: passenger services were withdrawn when the SDJR closed on 7 March 1966.

== The site today ==
The station building was converted into a house by the artist Peter Blake and his then wife Jann Haworth, in the mid-1970s, during their Brotherhood of Ruralists period. The signalbox at the northern end of the down platform has also been converted for residential use. The station's canopy is still visible from nearby green space where the rail track ran south of the station. The house sports a weather vane with a steam engine finial.

Preceding station	Disused railways	Following station
Shoscombe and Single Hill Halt; Line and station closed	Somerset & Dorset Joint Railway; LSWR and Midland Railways	Midford; Line and station closed
