= Graham Ovenden =

English painter, photographer and writer (1943–2022)

- Born: Graham Stuart Ovenden; 11 February 1943; Alresford, Hampshire, England
- Died: 9 December 2022 (aged 79)
- Occupations: Painter; photographer; writer
- Spouse: Ann Dinah Gilmore (m. 1973, divorced)

Graham Stuart Ovenden (11 February 1943 – 9 December 2022) was an English painter, fine art photographer and writer.

Some of Ovenden's art has been investigated as possible child pornography by American and British authorities, and in 2009 he was prosecuted in the UK on a charge of creating indecent images, but he was not convicted. In 2013, Ovenden was found guilty of six charges of indecency with a child and one charge of indecent assault against a child, and on 9 October 2013 he was jailed for two years and three months by the Court of Appeal. Following his conviction, some galleries removed images of his work from display. In 2015, a judge ordered that Ovenden's personal collection of paintings and photographs be destroyed.

== Life ==
Graham Stuart Ovenden was born in New Alresford, Hampshire, on 11 February 1943, into a Fabian household, attended Itchen Grammar School (1954–59) and was taught music privately by Albert Ketèlbey. He was a student at the Royal College of Music, before taking up painting around 1962. Ovenden was tutored by Lord David Cecil and John Betjeman. He attended the Southampton School of Art, and graduated from the Royal College of Art in 1968. One of his most important teachers was James Sellars, an expert on Samuel Palmer.

Ovenden moved to Cornwall from Richmond upon Thames in 1973 with painter Annie Ovenden and their family. He bought a cottage on Bodmin Moor with 22 acres of land and began constructing "Barley Splatt", a neo-Gothic building. The style is eclectic and has been influenced by John Betjeman and Frank Lloyd Wright; some features are influenced by World War II aeroplane engines and tin mine chimneys. All the building was done by Ovenden himself, and by 1988 the house was about half-finished. It was put on the market as an unfinished project in 2008 and sold.

Ovenden was a founder of the Brotherhood of Ruralists in 1975, along with Graham Arnold, Ann Arnold, Peter Blake, David Inshaw, Annie Ovenden, and Jann Haworth. The Brotherhood is no longer extant although in 2005 it had a major London exhibition at the Leicester Galleries. They were given the name "Brotherhood of Ruralists" by the writer Laurie Lee. His estranged wife is the artist Annie Ovenden. Their daughter, Emily, was a singer with the Mediæval Bæbes and Pythia, an author, and is now a publican and Church of England priest. Graham Ovenden died on 9 December 2022 at the age of 79.

== Work ==
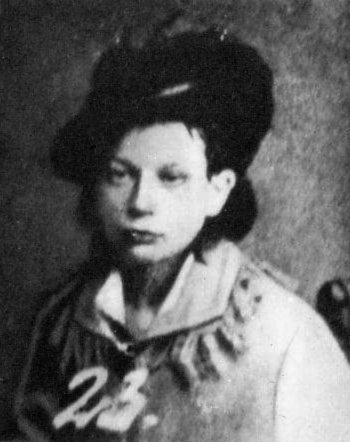
Photo taken from Victorian Children, London 1972 (Graham Ovenden and Robert Melville)

Ovenden was an artist, photographer, photo historian and collector of Victorian photography. His nude and semi-nude photographic portraits of young girls were published in the book States of Grace (Ophelia Editions, 1992). His photographs of the children's street culture in London taken in the late 1950s and early 1960s when Ovenden was a teenager have been published in Childhood Streets (Ophelia Editions, 1998) and in many catalogues issued by galleries and museums.

Aspects of Lolita (Academy Editions, 1976) contains prints inspired by Vladimir Nabokov's novel, Lolita. A general monograph of his paintings, drawings, prints, and photographs, entitled Graham Ovenden, was published by Academy Editions/St. Martin's Press in 1987.

Other publications containing his work include David Bailey, The Naked Eye. Great Photographers of the Nude (AMPHOTO, 1987); Emily Brontë, Sturmhöhe (illustrations by Ovenden) (Carl Bertelsmann, 1981); Charles Causley, A Tribute from the Artist (Exeter University, 1987); Robert Melville, Erotic Art of the West (G.P. Putnam's Sons, 1973); David Inshaw, Graham Ovenden, Martin Axon: Photographs 1957–1981 (Plymouth Arts Centre Touring Exhibition Catalogue); Graham Ovenden Photographs (Olympus Gallery, 1984); Bradley Smith, Erotic Art of the Masters: The 18th, 19th & 20th Centuries (Mayflower Books, 1980) and Bradley Smith, 20th Century Masters of Erotic Art (Fleetbooks, 1980).

Ovenden's work has also been featured on the covers of record albums (Malice in Wonderland by Paice Ashton Lord) and books, notably the Arden Shakespeare series, Sleep Pale Sister by Joanne Harris, and A. N. Wilson's Dream Children. His work is in numerous collections, including the Victoria and Albert Museum, The Tate, and the Metropolitan Museum of Art, New York.

As an authority on Victorian photography and illustration, Ovenden edited Pre-Raphaelite Photography (1972); Victorian Children (1972); Victorian Erotic Photography (1973); A Victorian Album – Julia Margaret Cameron and Her Circle (1975); Alphonse Mucha Photographs (1974); Clementina Lady Hawarden (1974); Hill & Adamson Photographs (1973); Lewis Carroll (1984); Nymphets and Fairies (1976) and Illustrators of Alice (1972). Writings by Ovenden on art and photography include Ruralism and the New Romanticism (Art & Design, 1988); On David Inshaw (Architectural Design, 1984); The Pre-Raphaelites (Architectural Design, 1984); The Black and White Art of Arthur Hughes (The Green Book, 1981); A Liddell Family Album (The Hillingdon Press, 1973); and Jane and Elizabeth, a selection of images of Jane Morris and Elizabeth Siddal (Hillingdon Press, 1972).

In addition, he curated numerous exhibitions, many featuring his extensive collection of antiquarian photographs, including the 1993/4 exhibition Recording Angels, The Work of Lewis Wickes Hine.

Ovenden and his work have been the subject of broadcasts and films, including Lolita Unclothed for the series World without Walls (ITV, Channel 4, 1993), Stop the Week (BBC Radio 4, 1989), Curious Houses with Lucinda Lambton (BBC TV, 1987), Bats in the Belfry – Home Sweet Home (ITV, 1987), Robinson Country: The Painter (ITV, 1987), Figures in a Landscape: The Brotherhood of Ruralists (BBC Radio 3, 1983), and Summer with the Ruralists, a film produced and directed by John Read for the BBC (1978–79). In 2000, the British Library funded a formal interview with Ovenden as part of its Oral History of British Photography series.

== Legal issues ==
=== Fraud charge ===
In 1980, Ovenden was prosecuted but found not guilty of fraud pertaining to his involvement in the production of hoax calotypes, purportedly images of Victorian street children by a photographer "Francis Hetling". The images were actually taken by Ovenden's friend Howard Grey and re-photographed and printed by Ovenden. Some of the images had been shown at the National Portrait Gallery.

=== States of Grace ===
Mostly, however, Ovenden's work has been controversial for its depiction of nude prepubescent girls. In 1991, as States of Grace was being published, a set of proofs and a photograph for the book were seized by U.S. Customs and held for over seven months. In February 1992, the U.S. Department of Justice claimed that the work depicted "sexually explicit conduct" and therefore was illegal to import, sell, or own. During a court hearing one month later in the United States District Court, Eastern District of New York, a federal prosecutor identified page 54 as containing the sole offending image in the book. This was a substantial retreat from the government's initial position that the book contained numerous images which theoretically could be found illegal.

A hearing before Magistrate Zachary Carter was held on 28 May 1992, attended by the subject depicted in the allegedly offending image, then 18 years of age, and eminent photo-historian and critic, A. D. Coleman. Both witnesses were prepared to testify and proffered written statements. The subject of the image on page 54 said:

I have known Graham Ovenden as a family friend for fourteen years – since I was four years old. I have modeled for Graham on numerous occasions – in fact, too numerous to count – for both his photographs and paintings. I have modeled for him both clothed and fully nude, both alone and with other children...The portrait which the United States has charged as indecent is a portrait of me as I was eight years ago. I am not acting in a sexual way in the picture, and Graham never asked me to act sexual or treated me as a sexual object. The accusation that the image is "obscene" is to me an accusation that I am 'obscene,' something to which I take offense.

A. D. Coleman's prepared statement noted the many artistic qualities of the image which were inconsistent with their being labelled "lascivious". Representatives of the American Civil Liberties Union's ACLU Foundation Arts Censorship Project were also in court to offer their brief, which was joined by artists, art critics, administrators, and organisations, in opposition to the government's attempt to censor States of Grace. As to the image on page 54, the ACLU brief stated: "[W]hether viewed individually or as part of the entire book, Ovenden's portrait appears plainly to be a photograph with genuine artistic, not pornographic, intentions, and thus a constitutionally-protected work of art."

Ovenden himself attested in writing as follows: "Symbolically speaking, we are dealing with feelings of the heart and the human yearning for Edenic simplicity – a state of grace, as it were, where there is neither sin nor corruption. The apple has yet to be eaten. The subject of course symbolizes this state in the photograph. At the same time, we see that the attainment of Eden is no easy task: the vulnerability of the child suggests or rather confirms the fragility of Eden as well as its fleeting nature in the face of the concerns of the adult world and the demands of modernity."

Ultimately, no testimony was required at the 28 May 1992 hearing. In the face of the subject's account of her experience of being photographed by Ovenden, the statements proffered by Ovenden and Coleman, and the support of the ACLU and others, the government acknowledged defeat and returned the photograph and the proofs. Two months later the book was imported into the United States.

On 21 May 1998, censors in New Zealand classified States of Grace as UNRESTRICTED, meaning that it was deemed suitable for all audiences. A document containing the classification, Classified books from 1963 to 31 July 2009 is available online from the New Zealand Office of Film & Literature Classification.

On 5 May 2000, the San Diego Public Library announced that it did not consider States of Grace (as well as David Hamilton's Twenty Five Years of an Artist) to contain child pornography and stated that both Ovenden and Hamilton are "contemporary and historically important photographers" whose work is "culturally and artistically significant" and "within the library's collection-development guidelines". The determination was made in response to a ruling by a San Diego Superior Court judge that a man had photocopied images from those books "not for art's sake but for sexual purposes." In late October 2009, British customs permitted entry of Ovenden's book, States of Grace, sent to a customer who purchased it at auction in the United States on eBay. The auction price was $350.00.

=== Confiscation and return of images ===
A year later, in England, some of Ovenden's photographs were confiscated by the Obscene Publications Squad from Scotland Yard but returned after a campaign by Lord Hutchinson, and fellow artists Sir Hugh Casson and David Hockney. Ovenden's work Five Girls and 29 other images in the permanent collection of the Tate Gallery were accessible online until October 2009, after which they were removed following the scandal that erupted over a photograph of Brooke Shields as part of the Tate Modern's 2009 Pop Life exhibit.

=== 2009 prosecution and failure of case ===
In 2009 Ovenden was charged with 16 counts of creating "indecent" photographs or pseudo-photographs (i.e., artistic renderings which appear to be photographs) of children and two counts of possessing 121 "indecent" photographs or pseudo-photographs of children. The 121 images are all versions or stages of the 16 works and had been deleted from Ovenden's computer at the time his home was raided in 2006. The images were subsequently undeleted by police. The prosecution argued that these images are "indecent" and that there can be no defence of creating or possessing "indecent" photographs or pseudo-photographs for artistic purposes. The defence argued that the works 121 images were temporary stages toward the creation of the 16 works, that those works constitute art, and in no event were any of the works created with criminal intent. The prosecution did not allege that the images at issue depict any actual children.

On 22 October 2009, after less than two days of trial, the jury was discharged and a new trial date set. On 9 April 2010, after a five-minute hearing, the case was thrown out by the judge, for two key prosecution witnesses – police officers who had searched his home three-and-a-half years earlier – failed to appear in court. The police declined to comment, and the CPS refused to disclose how much the investigation had cost the taxpayer. Graham Ovenden described the police as "totally and utterly transfixed by childhood sexuality" and himself as "a controversial figure, and at the moment, a very angry old man". The prosecution declined to launch an appeal.

=== 2013 charges, prosecution, and conviction ===
On 19 April 2010, the Western Morning News said the Child Abuse Investigation Team of the Metropolitan Police, the force which had carried out the three-and-a-half-year investigation for the trial, was investigating Ovenden over allegations of child sex abuse. Ovenden said such allegations had been made at the start of the previous investigation and dropped and that "the Metropolitan Police are being very vindictive about this."

In March 2013, Ovenden went on trial at Truro Crown Court, accused with nine charges of indecency with a child and indecent assault on victims aged between six and 14. He denied the claims. On 2 April, Ovenden was found guilty of six charges of indecency with a child and one charge of indecent assault against a child. The charges came from adults who claimed they had been abused by Ovenden as children. Some of them involved claims that he abused children while they were posing for his pictures. The abuse charges related to incidents between 1972 and 1985. Ovenden was sentenced to 12 months imprisonment, suspended for two years.

On 9 October 2013 the Appeal Court increased his sentence to an immediate prison term of 27 months.

Following his conviction, the Victoria and Albert Museum removed half of their 14 Ovenden images from its website, and the Tate removed 34 of his images from its online collection, although it later reinstated images of three abstract landscapes. In 2015, District Judge Elizabeth Roscoe ordered that Ovenden's personal collection of paintings and photographs created by him and others be destroyed, stating: "I have very little doubt that sexual gratification is at the very least part of Mr Ovenden’s reasons for making these images." Ovenden responded to the press: "I am a famous artist. I am an equally famous photographer, and they are destroying material which has been in the public domain for over 40 years."

== See also ==
- Child sexual abuse in the United Kingdom
- Francis Hetling
