= David Inshaw =

British painter

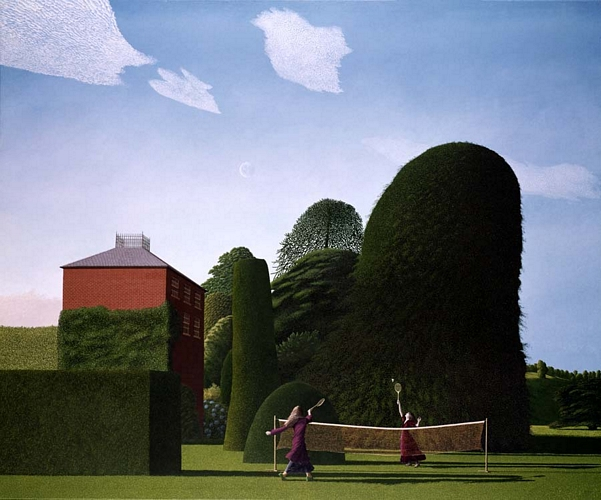
The Badminton Game, 1972-73, by David Inshaw (details).

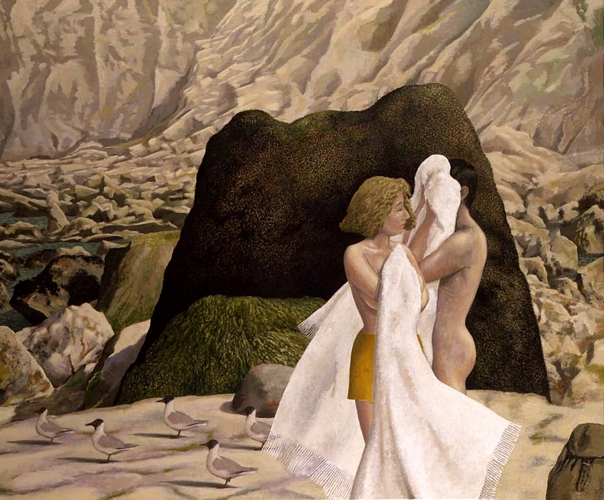
The Rucksack (Anticipation), 1994-95, by David Inshaw (details).

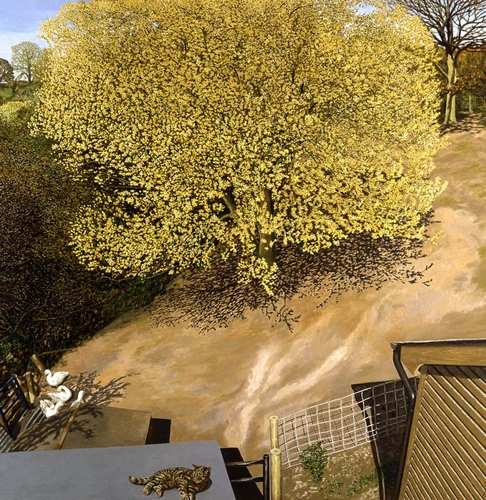
Pussy Willow, 1998-2004, by David Inshaw (details).

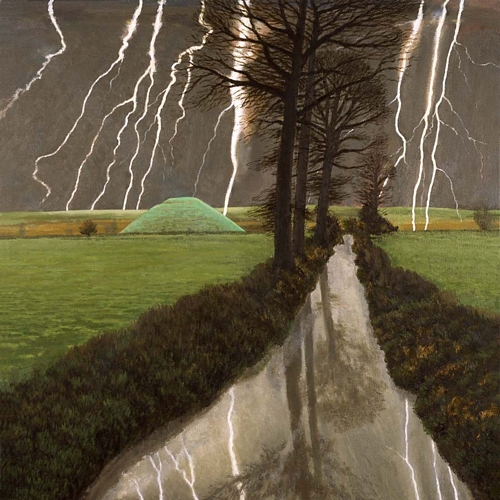
Storm over Silbury Hill, 2008, by David Inshaw (details).

David Inshaw (born 21 March 1943 in Wednesfield, Staffordshire, England) is a British artist who sprang to public attention in 1973 when his painting The Badminton Game was exhibited at the ICA Summer Studio exhibition in London. The painting was subsequently acquired by the Tate Gallery and is one of several paintings from the 1970s that won him critical acclaim and a wide audience. Others include The Raven, Our days were a joy and our paths through flowers, She did not turn, The Cricket Game, Presentiment and The River Bank (Ophelia).

== Career ==
David Inshaw studied at Beckenham School of Art in 1959–63 and the Royal Academy Schools in 1963-66. A teaching post at the West of England College of Art, Bristol, in 1966–75 was followed by a two-year fellowship in Creative Art at Trinity College, Cambridge, in 1975–77. Inshaw moved to Devizes, Wiltshire, in 1971 and formed the Broadheath Brotherhood with Graham and Ann Arnold in 1972. The three artists were joined by Peter Blake, Jann Haworth, and Graham and Annie Ovenden in 1975, when the group was renamed the Brotherhood of Ruralists. The Ruralists exhibited together for the first time at the Royal Academy Summer Exhibition in 1976, and Inshaw left the group seven years later, in 1983. He moved to Clyro near Hay-on-Wye in 1989 but returned to Devizes in 1995 and has lived there since.

Inshaw's paintings are held in many private and public collections, including the Arts Council of Great Britain, Bristol City Museum and Art Gallery, the British Council, the Royal West of England Academy, Tate Britain and Wiltshire Museum.

A major book on Inshaw's life and work was published in 2010, the David Inshaw website and on-line gallery was launched in 2011, and Inshaw was made an honorary Doctor of Letters by Durham University in 2012. An exhibition of new paintings and The Badminton Game (on loan from Tate Britain) was held at the Fine Art Society, London, in 2013 with a second exhibition in 2015 to coincide with an updated edition of Andrew Lambirth's book on the artist. Bonjour Mr Inshaw is a collection of poetry inspired by Inshaw's art written by Peter Robinson and illustrated with David Inshaw's works.

== Selected exhibitions ==
- 1966: Young Contemporaries. RBA Galleries, London.
- 1969: David Inshaw. Arnolfini Gallery, Bristol.
- 1972: David Inshaw: Recent Paintings and Prints. Arnolfini Gallery, Bristol.
- 1973: Summer Studio. Institute of Contemporary Arts, London.
- 1975: David Inshaw: Paintings, Collages, Pastels and Drawings. Waddington Galleries, London.
- 1976: The Brotherhood of Ruralists. Royal Academy Summer Exhibition, London.
- 1977: David Inshaw: Paintings and Drawings. Trinity College, Cambridge.
- 1978: David Inshaw. Brighton Museum & Art Gallery, Sussex.
- 1980: David Inshaw. Waddington Galleries, London.
- 1983: The Definitive Nude. Tate Gallery, London.
- 1984: David Inshaw. Waddington Galleries, London.
- 1987: David Inshaw. Nishimura Gallery, Tokyo, Japan.
- 1989: David Inshaw. Waddington Galleries, London.
- 1995: David Inshaw: Recent Paintings and Drawings. Theo Waddington Fine Art, London.
- 1996: David Inshaw. Annandale Gallery, Sydney, Australia.
- 1998: David Inshaw: Recent Paintings. Theo Waddington Fine Art, London.
- 2003: Friends and Influences. Royal West of England Academy, Bristol.
- 2004: Art of the Garden. Tate Britain, London.
- 2004: David Inshaw: Moments of Vision (Between Fantasy and Reality). Agnew's, London.
- 2005: David Inshaw: Paintings from 1965 to 2005. Narborough Hall, Norfolk.
- 2007: David Inshaw: West Bay Beatitudes. Sladers Yard, West Bay, Dorset.
- 2008: David Inshaw: Between Dreaming and Waking. The Millinery Works, London.
- 2013: Paintings by David Inshaw. The Fine Art Society, London.
- 2013: David Inshaw: Recent Paintings. Sladers Yard, West Bay, Dorset.
- 2015: David Inshaw: New Paintings. The Fine Art Society, London.
- 2019: David Inshaw: Looking Back, Looking Forward. The Saatchi Gallery, London.
- 2019: David Inshaw: A Vision of Landscape. The Redfern Gallery, London.

== Filmography ==
- 1974: Private Landscapes, a BBC documentary produced by John Carlaw and directed by Keith Shearer.
- 1977: Summer with the Brotherhood, a BBC documentary produced and directed by John Read.
- 1984: Between Dreaming and Waking, a film for the BBC's Arena series directed by Geoffrey Haydon.
- 2005: The Mystical West, episode six of the BBC series A Picture of Britain, presented by David Dimbleby.
- 2011: Hidden Paintings of the West, a BBC documentary about The Badminton Game, presented by Laurence Llewelyn-Bowen.
