= Graham Arnold (artist) =

English contemporary fine artist (1932–2019)

Graham Arnold (1932 – 19 March 2019) was an English contemporary fine artist, working primarily in oil and mixed media.

Arnold, along with his wife and fellow artist Ann Arnold, was a founder member of the Brotherhood of Ruralists, with Sir Peter Blake, David Inshaw, Jann Haworth, Graham Ovenden and Annie Ovenden.

Arnold's work contains a combination of realistic and surrealist elements. Subjects often include still life and landscapes. Themes such as Lewis Carroll's Alice In Wonderland and Ophelia inspired his work and that of the Brotherhood as a whole.

Arnold's paintings are held in a number of public collections, including the Royal Academy of Arts, Victoria and Albert Museum, Museum of New Zealand Te Papa Tongarewa and the British Museum.
