= Ann Arnold =

British painter (1936–2015)

- Ann Arnold in 2003
- Born: Ann Telfer; 4 January 1936; Newcastle-upon-Tyne, United Kingdom
- Died: 28 December 2015 (aged 79)
- Known for: Painting
- Movement: Ruralist
- Spouse: Graham Arnold (m. 1961)

Ann Arnold née Telfer, (4 January 1936 – 28 December 2015) was an English fine art and figurative artist and a member of the Brotherhood of Ruralists.

Ann Arnold was born in Newcastle-upon-Tyne, and studied at Epsom School of Art (1956–1959). Her father, Edmund Telfer, was a naval architect. From 1959 to 1969 Arnold worked as an art therapist, and founded the Association of Art Therapists. She married fellow artist Graham Arnold in 1961. She was a founder member of the Brotherhood of Ruralists in 1976 with him, Sir Peter Blake, David Inshaw, Graham Ovenden, Annie Ovenden and Jann Haworth. Both Anne and Graham were based in Devizes, Wiltshire for a number of years after 1975, before settling in the Redlake Valley of southern Shropshire.

Arnold mainly worked in oil on canvas and watercolour. In 1981 she illustrated Claire's Countryside and also designed covers for editions of the Arden Shakespeare series.

She was an Academician of the South West Academy of Fine and Applied Art.

She died on 28 December 2015, and interred at St Mary's Church in Chapel Lawn, Shropshire.
