= Annie Ovenden =

British painter

Ann Dinah Ovenden (née Gilmore, born 1945) is an English fine artist and a founder member of the Brotherhood of Ruralists. She is a figurative artist.

== Biography ==
Ovenden was born in 1945 in Amersham, Buckinghamshire. Ovenden was educated at the Royal Wanstead School and from 1961, studied at High Wycombe School of Art. She worked as a graphic designer and painter in London, before moving to Cornwall with her then-husband Graham Ovenden in 1973.

In 1975, she was a founding member of the Brotherhood of Ruralists with Graham Ovenden, Peter Blake, David Inshaw, Ann Arnold and her husband Graham Arnold, and Jann Haworth. She has been elected to the St Ives Society of Artists.

Ovenden's paintings have a Romantic rural theme, for example painting portraits of inhabitants of a small Cornwall village. She has had solo exhibitions in Ludlow (1990) and Liskeard (2001). She has designed theatre sets and props, including for London's Hampstead Garden Opera.
