= The First Real Target? =

Painting by Peter Blake

The First Real Target? is a painting by British pop artist Peter Blake. It was completed in 1961.

The painting is now displayed at the Tate Gallery in London.

== Painting ==
It is said that the work was inspired by target paintings by pop artist Jasper Johns, which he completed in the 1950s.

A familiar object was reproduced on canvas and was said to be the inspiration of many artists in the early 1960s, such as Blake and also Warhol.

Blake bought an archery target from his local sports shop, which he used as a prop to complete the painting.
