= The River Bank (Ophelia) =

1980 painting by David Inshaw

The River Bank (Ophelia), David Inshaw, 140 cm × 120 cm (55 in × 47 in), Victoria Art Gallery

The River Bank (Ophelia) is a 1980 oil-on-canvas painting by the English painter David Inshaw. The subject is from William Shakespeare's play Hamlet. It was made for a joint exhibition of the Brotherhood of Ruralists, where each artist made his own interpretation of the subject. Since 2015 it belongs to the Victoria Art Gallery in Bath, Somerset.

== Description ==
The painting depicts an English garden. In the foreground is a river, in which a drowned woman lies. Another woman is running away, holding her red, broad-brimmed hat with both hands.

== Themes ==
The Victoria Art Gallery writes: "In The River Bank we see the contrast between the carefully ordered world of the enclosed garden and the untamed wildness of the river bank, between reason and the madness that overcame Ophelia, this tragic Shakespearean character."

Sujata Iyengar, professor of English at the University of Georgia, wrote in the 2016 book Rethinking Feminism in Early Modern Studies: "The postmodern hyperrealistic style, with vivid colors and granular detail on, for example, the petals of an iris, clongates and twists the women's bodies, the clothing of the drowned girl, and the shapes of greenery in a way that makes it hard for us to know whether we are seeing Gertrude (or a ladies' maid) discovering Ophelia's corpse, or Ophelia herself in both past and present, both contemplating suicide and achieving it."

== Provenance ==
The painting was made for a joint exhibition of the Brotherhood of Ruralists, of which Inshaw was a founding member. The character Ophelia from William Shakespeare's Hamlet was the common theme for the entire exhibition.

It was bought by a private collector in October 1980. It was sold on 9 December 2015 as part of Christie's auction Modern British & Irish Art (Sale 10443). It was acquired by the Victoria Art Gallery with support from the ACE/V&A Purchase Grant Fund and the Friends of the Victoria Art Gallery.
