= RSRCHXchange =

British FinTech company

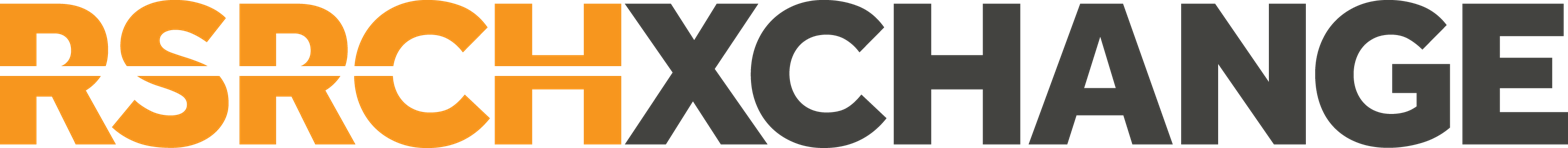
- Trade name: RSRCHXchange
- Industry: Financial Technology
- Founded: 2014; 12 years ago in London, England
- Services: Institutional Financial Research
- Website: www.rsrchxchange.com

Research Exchange Ltd is a FinTech company servicing the global asset management industry operating under the trading name RSRCHXchange. Its platform, RSRCHX, is an online marketplace for unbundled financial research. RSRCHX provides asset management firms with a cloud-based repository of reports. Launched in September 2015, RSRCHX incorporates elasticsearch, compliance checks and Commission Sharing Agreement (CSA) and credit card payment administration. RSRCHXchange is one of a number of FinTech start-ups offering products which relate to MiFID II (Markets in Financial Instruments Directive), the European Union financial reforms intended as a response to the financial crisis to improve the functioning of financial markets and enhance investor protection. RSRCHXchange's technology differs from other financial services vendors because its research catalogue is not dependent on RIXML, the industry-developed language for tagging documents. RSRCHXchange specialises in research unbundling, one of the most contentious topics of the regulation.

== Research unbundling ==
Globally $20bn a year is spent on research by asset managers and in the UK alone, the FCA estimates $4.5bn is spent on research. Investment banks being the predominant supplier of external research to most investment managers. This effective oligopoly is the result of bundled commission rates where all services, including research, are paid for at the point of trading exclusively to the executing counterparty. Therefore, the investment banks who enjoy the largest trading volumes have also captured a dominant share of research payments.

The UK FCA (Financial Conduct Authority) and ESMA (European Securities and Markets Authority) have been debating reforms to the economic structure of investment research for a decade. The dot com boom of 2000 made it abundantly clear to regulators that equity research, investors, fund managers and public companies were too heavily interdependent. The US responded by imposing restrictions on sell side analyst activities, while the UK placed the responsibility on the buy side through the Myners Report (2001), which recommended changes in commission and investment research payments – effectively unbundling. The FCA has consistently argued that unbundling research from dealing commissions would drive both price efficiency and market transparency and at the same time enhance competition.

In 2006, the introduction of commission sharing agreements (CSAs), which enabled fund managers for the first time to instruct their broker to pay away commissions to other research entities, was a further crucial step towards research unbundling. Given the UK market's global significance, and the international nature of the brokerage market, this approach has gained traction internationally beyond the UK and represents a significant change in the market for investment research.

MiFID II has the potential to be the most significant catalyst for change in the market for investment research in decades. Crucially, the implementation of MiFID II, which is currently scheduled for January 2018, will require all sell side research to be individually priced and thus effect full price transparency. Investment firms will be required to set and assess research budgets and MiFID II states that that payment must be direct, out of the firm's own resources, without any undue delay. Full unbundling will finally be achieved as fund management firms will be required to create research payment accounts (RPAs) based on a pre-set budget independent of trading activity. This has met with heavy criticism and lobbying from a number of industry organisations. The MiFID II text also includes further demands of buy side firms which will require buyers and sellers to review and revise the research procurement process. The FCA has already issued a statement of “support” for ESMA's new policies for investment research and advising asset management firms to start making changes now to prepare themselves for the inevitable regulatory change. While MiFID II's scope is pan-European only, the regulator recognises that its proposed changes may resonate on a global scale as asset managers are likely to adopt a common system across their global businesses.

== Commission sharing agreement ==
Commission sharing agreements (CSA) allow asset management firms to pay out a portion of commissions to research providers instead of the executing broker retaining the entire commission, Commission Sharing Agreements (CSAs) have expanded the content available to investment managers. CSAs have gained traction as a tool giving asset managers greater control over their research payments and enabling them to expand their range of research providers to include independent research providers (IRPs).

CSA penetration rates vary significantly across Europe but are highest in the UK, recently reaching 70%. In the US, the use of Client Commission Arrangements (CSA equivalent) is well-entrenched and these two geographies have leading IRP presence. There are estimates of between 2,000 and 6,000 IRPs. Research has shown that the introduction of CSAs has enabled fund managers to access a broader range of research, providing more valuable inputs to their investment process and thus benefiting the end investor.
