= Commission sharing agreement =

A commission sharing agreement (CSA), or in the United States also known as a client commission agreement (CCA), is a type of soft dollar arrangement that allows money managers to separately pay the executing broker for trade execution and ask that broker to allocate a portion of the commission directly to an independent research provider. CSAs consist of a percentage of execution fees, that are directed to pay for research reports from sell-side banks. The form of a CSA can be as short as one page. One of the disadvantages of CSAs is the counterparty risk, that the broker becomes as the cash is held on the broker's balance sheet and not in a segregated client account. Moves included in MiFID II such as the creation of Research Payment Accounts (RPAs) aim to address this issue.

== Regulatory framework ==
In the United States, client commission arrangements are generally structured to comply with Section 28(e) of the Securities Exchange Act of 1934, which provides a "safe harbor" for money managers to use client brokerage commissions to obtain research and brokerage services under certain conditions.

Moves included in MiFID II such as the creation of separate payment arrangements aim to address the issues with bundled research and execution payments. Under MiFID II, portfolio managers and investment firms must separate the costs of execution services and third-party research unless they use specific research payment mechanisms agreed with clients. This unbundling requirement was intended to improve transparency and reduce potential conflicts of interest arising from traditional commission arrangements, such as CSAs. Portfolio managers may pay for research either from their own resources or by using a specified research payment account funded with client money and based on a pre-set research budget that is annually assessed and disclosed to clients.
