= Shoscombe and Single Hill Halt railway station =

Former railway station in England

Coordinates: 51°18′N 2°24′W

Shoscombe & Single Hill Halt
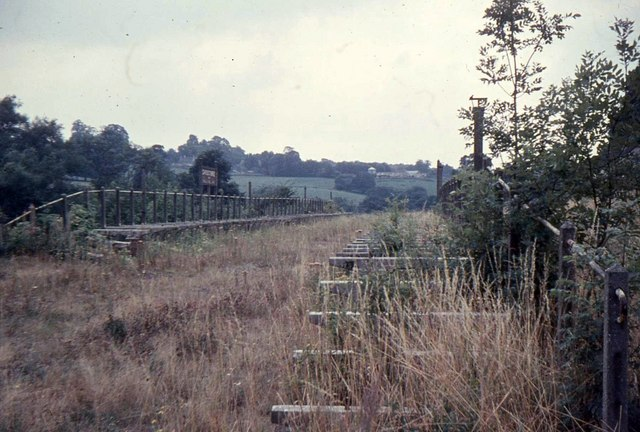
- Remains of the Halt in 1967

General information
- Location: Shoscombe, Bath and North East Somerset; England
- Grid reference: ST720561
- Platforms: 2

Other information
- Status: Disused

History
- Post-grouping: SR and LMSR; Western Region of British Railways

Key dates
- 23 September 1929: Opened
- 7 March 1966: Closed
Location

Shoscombe & Single Hill Halt was a small railway station on the Somerset and Dorset Joint Railway serving small villages between Wellow and Radstock, about seven miles south of Bath.

The station was the last to open on the Somerset and Dorset main line, with services beginning on 23 September 1929. It closed with the rest of the line on 7 March 1966 under the Beeching Axe.

The station, sited in the hamlet of Single Hill, consisted of two bare concrete platforms, with ornate oil lamps but without buildings. A small building containing a booking office and a waiting room was provided on the footpath leading to the station.

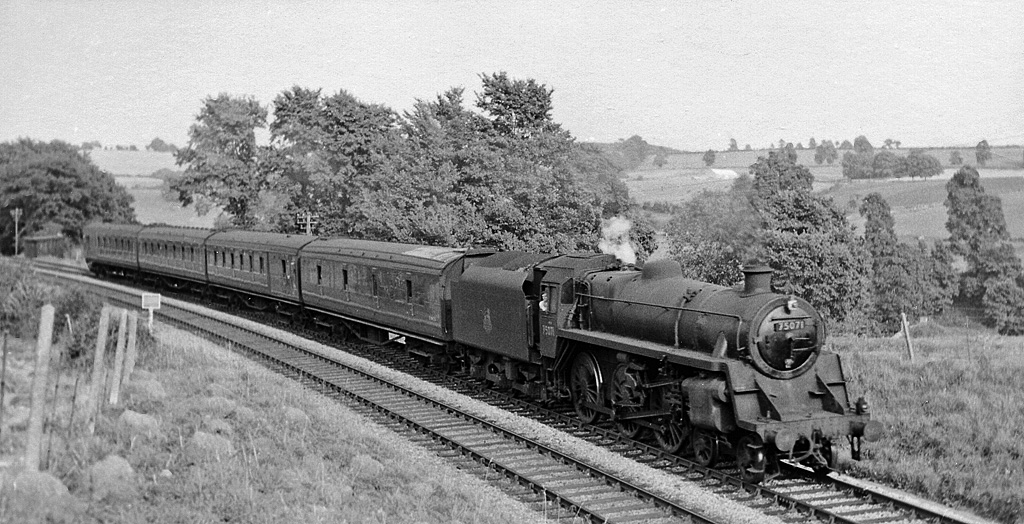
Somerset & Dorset train in 1959

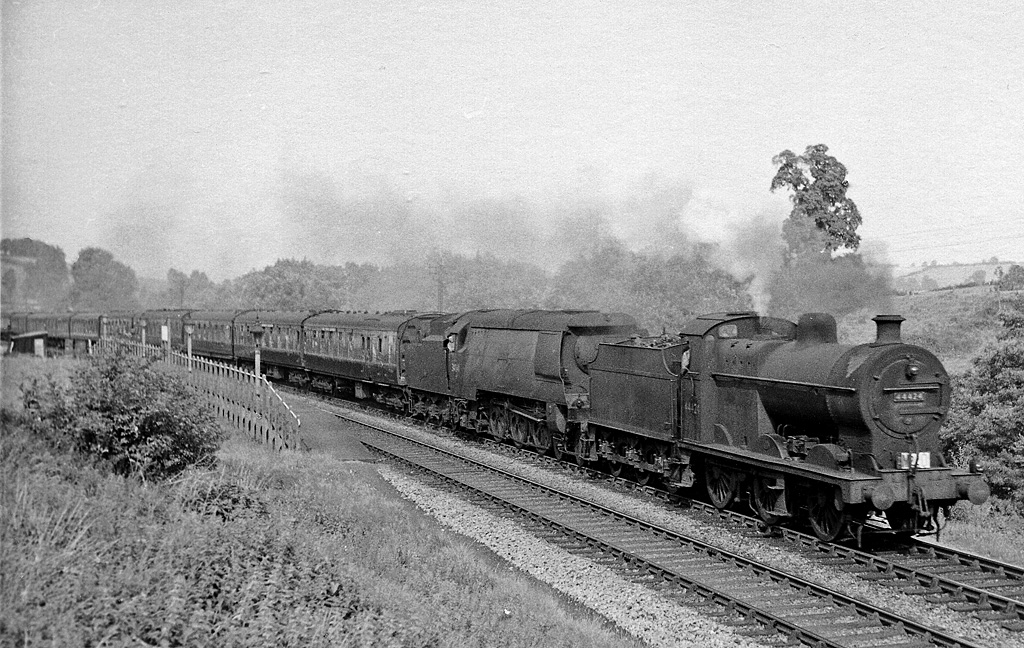
Southbound Pines Express passing Shoscombe & Single Hill Halt in 1959

Preceding station	Disused railways	Following station
Radstock North; Line and station closed	Somerset & Dorset Joint Railway; SR and LMSRs	Wellow; Line and station closed
