= On-target earnings =

Type of salary based on employee performance

"On-track" or "on-target" earnings (OTE) is a term often seen in job advertisements, especially for sales personnel. It is the expected total pay, if performance matches the expected targets. Actual pay may be higher or lower. The typical pay structure may be composed of a basic salary with an additional amount of commission, known together as a "package". The package usually involves a contract between the company and the salesperson that ensures a specific commission percentage, fixed lump sum payment, or a combination of both, provided that the salesperson hits specified sales targets. While all commission plans are unique, often exceeding sales targets results in higher commission rates on sales beyond target for a specific period. Alternatively, on target earnings can refer to an executive pay schedule contingent upon the achievement of specified goals.
