= John Howlin =

Canadian painter

John Howlin (1941–2006) was a British-born painter, print-maker and sculptor.

I'll remember April no. 1, by John Howlin, acrylic on canvas, 60 x 72 inches, 1962.

Howlin studied at Hammersmith School of Art 1957–1959 and taught at Ealing School of Art, and moved to Toronto, Canada in 1969. Later lived in France.

In 1963 British art dealer John Kasmin (1934-) and art patron Sheridan Dufferin (5th Marquess of Dufferin and Ava (1938–1988)) opened their art gallery at 118 New Bond Street. They represented Howlin who was given a solo exhibition in 1965.

One of his first major exhibitions was a group show in June 1963 at the Whitechapel Art Gallery in London, alongside David Hockney (1937-), Ian Stephenson (1934–2000) and Howard Hodgkin (1932–2017). Vogue magazine in August 1963 enjoyed this exhibition and hailed them as 'The impact Makers – Edward Lucie-Smith reviews an exhibition at the Whitechapel Gallery – four artists making an impact on British art – Includes a full page full colour picture of David Hockney, John Howlin, Ian Stephenson, and Howard Hodgkin'.

In Canada he exhibited at the Ruby-Fiorino Gallery (Queen Street West in Toronto) which was allied to an artist's co-operative called Workscene.

Howlin's work was somewhat influenced by Victor Vasarely (1906–1997) and his use of emulsion, shapes, colour and dots looks forward to that of Sarah Morris, Damien Hirst and Gary Hume.

== Some exhibitions ==
- British Painting in the Sixties : 1–30 June 1963, group show. An Exhibition Organized by the Contemporary Arts Society.

David Hockney, John Howlin, Ian Stephenson, and Howard Hodgkin.

- 4 Young Artists 1963. Jann Haworth (1942-), Brian Mills (1941-), John Pearson (1940-), and John Howlin. Institute of Contemporary Arts. London. 18 September-19 October 1963.
- Lisson Gallery: John Howlin: Recent Prints. 21 May – 8 June 1968.
- John Howlin. Paintings and Graphics 1975/1976. Art Gallery of York University, 10–28 March 1976. Art Gallery of York University., Ontario, 1976;
- An exhibition circa 1982 at Ruby-Fiorino Gallery, Toronto;
- John Howlin 5–22 April 1989, Ruby-Fiorino Gallery, Toronto;
- John Howlin, Œuvres récentes, DU 5 JUIN 1992 AU 5 JUILLET 1992, at AMAC (Association Mouvement d'Art Contemporain), Chamalières, France.

== Some works ==
- I'll remember April no 1, acrylic on canvas, 60 by 72 inches (150 by 180 centimetres), 1962. Gift from the Contemporary Art Society, 1976, to the Norfolk Museums Service;
- Staten, 1962, gift from the Contemporary Art Society, 1976, acrylic on canvas, 168 x 168 cm, Doncaster Museum and Art Gallery;
- Untitled, 1964, oil paint and plastic emulsion, 58 cm x 51 cm;
- Tedesco, 1962–1965, Colchester and Ipswich Museums Service: Ipswich Borough Council Collection, 169 x 169 cm, acrylic on canvas, gift from the Contemporary Art Society;
- Sangaree, purchased for the Electrical Engineering and Electronics Building, University of Liverpool, 1965, 183 x 168 cm, acrylic on canvas;
- Appian I, 40 x 30 inches, acrylic and emulsion on canvas, with Kasmin Ltd, June 1965.
- Appian II, 102 x 77 cm, acrylic on canvas, Kasmin Ltd, July 1965;
- Plaza, 1965, 102 x 77 cm, acrylic on canvas;
- Gaul, 1965. Exhibited at Kasmin Gallery (Kasmin Limited, 1965) and Southampton Art Gallery (1975). Signed on back. 53 by 53 inches.
- Tezuma II, 1965, transferred and accessioned by the Museum of Croydon, 1992, Croydon Art Collection, 129 x 77 cm, acrylic emulsion on canvas;
- Aeolian, 3/1967, acrylic emulsion on canvas, 78 by 72 inches (200 by 180 centimetres), Southampton Art Gallery, purchased with Corporation funds with 50% grant from the Gulbenkian Foundation;
- Aragon IV, 40 x 30 inches, acrylic emulsion on canvas, Kasmin Gallery;
- Scotia 1965, 72 x 72 inches, acrylic on canvas, Kasmin Gallery;
- Brandenburg, 1970, Arts Council Collection, 198.1 x 241.3 cm, acrylic on canvas, purchased from the artist, 1970;
- Heroic Geometry #16, acrylic on canvas, 51" x 36" 1980;
- Ellington's A, acrylic on canvas, on verso signed, titled and dated 1982, 67 in × 90 in (170 cm × 230 cm), Heffel, Calgary/Vancouver, Lot 325, July 2016, $2,500 CAD ($3,125 inclusive). Provenance: Ruby-Fiorino Gallery, Toronto;
- Crazy Cotillion, acrylic on canvas, 41' x 53' (framed) 1983;
- Little Devil (Petit Diable), wood-cut and acrylic, 16" x 16" 1985;
- You Must Realize, mixed media on canvas, 1990, 134 cm x 100 cm;
- History Lesson, acrylic on canvas, 52" x 38' 1990;
- P'Tit Kamikazi, mixed media on canvas, 1992, 93 cm x 76 cm
- When Your Heart's on Fire, mixed media on canvas, 134 cm x 100 cm
- Conjunction #1, acrylic on canvas, 48" x 30";
- Sing the Song, 134 cm x100cm, circa 1989, sold at Plymouth Auction Rooms, 29 April 2015, lot 414;
- Mile Stone #1 #2, wood-cut and acrylic, 60" x 11" 4" 1996
- Par Avion, acrylic on canvas, 38" x 52";

- A set of four untitled prints in the V & A, 1965. Acquired from Kasmin Ltd., London in 1969. 1/10, 30.25 in x 22 1/8 in;
- Now and Then, Silkscreen on paper 29" x 43" (framed) 1975
- How and Why, Silkscreen on Paper 29" x 43" (framed) 1975
- Circoux #1, Silkscreen on paper 1976
- Circoux #2, Silkscreen on paper 1976

== Literature ==
- Vogue, August 1963, The impact Makers – Edward Lucie Smith reviews an exhibition at the Whitechapel Gallery – four artists making an impact on British art, featuring a photo by Peter Rand (1940-) (Vogue ©The Condé Nast Publications Ltd.);
- 'John Howlin recent paintings', published by Kasmin Ltd., London, 1965. Single sheet, folded into 4 pages, 6 illustrations, and brief exhibition chronology.
- 4 Young Artists 1963. Jann Haworth (1942-), Brian Mills (1941-), John Pearson (1940-), John Howlin.

Institute of Contemporary Arts. London.18 September-19 October 1963.

- Lisson Gallery: John Howlin: Recent Prints. 21 May – 8 June 1968.
- John Howlin. Paintings and Graphics 1975/1976. Art Gallery of York University, 10–28 March 1976. Art Gallery of York University., Ontario, 1976;
- 'JOHN HOWLIN' – April 1992, PRÉSENTATION, Association Mouvement d'Art Contemporain, 3, avenue de Fontmaure, 63400 Chamalières, France;
- John HOWLIN – Œuvres récentes, 40 pages – Broché – 22 x 22 cm, 1992, AMAC (Association Mouvement d'Art Contemporain), Chamalières, France;
- Assembled by Philip, Toronto. Philip Walker's collection of Howlin's works (http://www.assembledbyphilip.com/john-howlin/);
- AMAC website – (http://www.amac-chamalieres.com/artiste/howlin)
- Mister Anchovy's blog, John Howlin RIP, Saturday, 4 November 2006: (http://misteranchovy.blogspot.co.uk/2006/11/john-howlin-rip.html).
