= Commission (remuneration) =

Form of variable-pay remuneration for services rendered or products sold

A commission is a form of variable-pay remuneration for services rendered or products sold. Commissions are a common way to motivate and reward salespeople. Commissions can also be designed to encourage specific sales behaviors. For example, commissions may be reduced when granting large discounts. Or commissions may be increased when selling certain products the organization wants to promote. Commissions are usually implemented within the framework of a sales incentive program, which can include one or multiple commission plans (each typically based on a combination of territory, position, or products).

Payments are often calculated using a percentage of revenue, a way for firms to solve the principal–agent problem by attempting to realign employees' interests with those of the firm. However, models other than percentages are possible, such as profit-based approaches, or bonus-based approaches. Commissions allow sales personnel to be paid (in part or entirely) based on products or services sold, rather than just hourly or based on attempted sales. Although many types of commission systems exist, a common methodology to manage total spend is known as on-target earnings. On-target earnings represent a salesperson's base pay, plus expected commissions (assuming the salesperson meets a quota). On-target earnings help salespersons estimate their expected total compensation, should they meet company-specified goals.

One of the most common means of attempting to align principal and agent interests is to design incentives tracking agent performance. There is a high degree of variability in terms of types of compensation plans, such as fixed salary, straight commissions, or a combination of both. Often, commissions are awarded for reaching a sales goal called a quota. Also, commission structures can include multiple levels of attainments, each with a different threshold and associated rewards.

A commission structure can apply to employees or independent contractors. Industries where commissions are common include car sales, property sales, insurance broking, and most sales jobs. In the United States, a real estate broker who successfully sells a property might collect a commission of 6% of the sale price.

== Legal implications ==
In a case from the 19th century that is still referred to today, Murray v. Beard, 7 N.E. 553, 554-55 (N.Y. 1886), the New York Court of Appeals held that under New York's faithless servant doctrine a disloyal broker could not recover commissions from his employer, holding that "An agent is held to uberrima fides in his dealings with his principal; and if he acts adversely to his employer in any part of the transaction ... it amounts to such a fraud upon the principal, as to forfeit any right to compensation for services."

In 2011, California Governor Jerry Brown signed into law AB 1396 amending the California Labor Code requiring all employers who pay commissions to enter into written contracts with their employees regarding how commissions will be earned, computed and paid. The new law, effective on January 1, 2013, further states that commission excludes "short-term productivity bonuses such as those paid to retail clerks" and "bonus and profit-sharing plans, unless there has been an offer by the employer to pay a fixed percentage of sales or profits as compensation for work to be performed".

== Trail commission ==
Trail commission (TC) is commission paid by investment management companies to financial advisers. It is generally around 0.1% to 0.9% p.a. of the value invested by a client.

If an investment is made directly through a financial adviser, TC is generally kept by the adviser.

A financial adviser should act purely in the investors' best interests. However, it is possible that the financial adviser may direct the investment towards funds that are most profitable in terms of TC. Supporters of the directing of investments into funds benefiting the financial adviser claim that it encourages the adviser to maintain the value of the portfolio, thus aligning their interests with those of their clients. Detractors suggest that investors are usually unaware of the practice and that it is ineffective as an incentive.

Following the Retail Distribution Review in the United Kingdom, trail commission is banned on sales of new investment products as of April 6, 2014 and will required to be completely phased out by April 6, 2016.

== UK ==
In the financial services industry in the UK, rules set out in the Retail Distribution Review of December 31, 2012 mean that an independent financial adviser cannot take commission in the management of their client's wealth. As set out by the Financial Conduct Authority, advisers must now agree an upfront charging structure in advance to a client before advice is given.

For customers who do not want to pay a separate upfront fee, there is an option to have payment of the charges deducted from the investment held by the product provider. These new measures have been applauded by many, particularly in the financial services industry. This has led to changes in the direct to consumer, non-advised sector, with some companies now charging upfront fees to customers for financial products rather than taking commission on policies and investments.

== See also ==
- Soft dollar
- Kickback (dealing with illegal commission)
