= Brotherhood of Ruralists =

Group of British artists

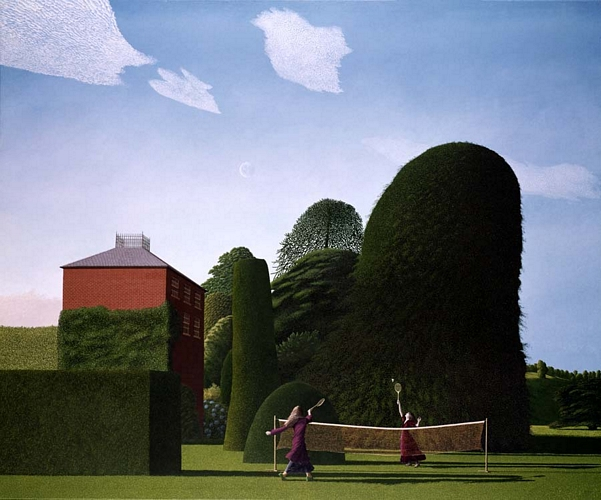
The Badminton Game by David Inshaw, typical of the work of the Brotherhood

The Brotherhood of Ruralists is a British art group founded in 1975 in Wellow, Somerset, to paint nature. Their work is figurative with a strong adherence to 'traditional' skills. Painting in oil and watercolour predominate, with mixed media assemblage, printmaking, ink and pencil drawing also being common. It has been described as "a kind of late twentieth-century reinvention of William Morris's arcadian craft guilds."

== Origins ==
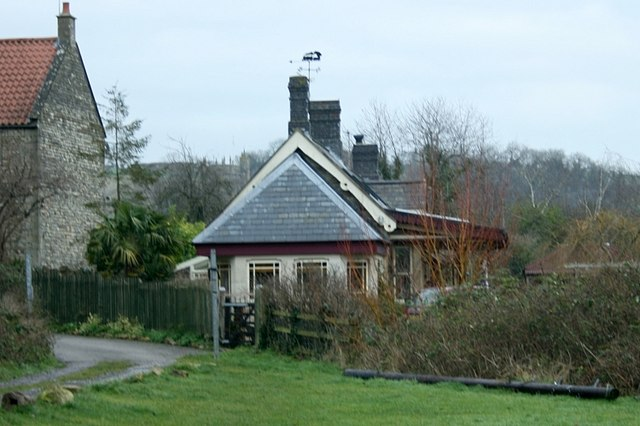
The converted Wellow railway station in 2007

The group was founded when Peter Blake and his then wife Jann Haworth moved to Wellow, having obtained permission to convert the disused Wellow railway station into a house. Other founding members were David Inshaw and two other couples: Ann Arnold and Graham Arnold, and Annie Ovenden and Graham Ovenden. The name "Brotherhood of Ruralists" was suggested by author Laurie Lee, a supporter of the group. Some members were never happy with "brotherhood", since it implied an all-male membership.

According to Peter Blake, it was formed,

in opposition to the scholarly nature of contemporary art which believed that paintings were only really valid if they addressed social questions. Our aims are the continuation of a certain kind of English painting. We admire Samuel Palmer, Stanley Spencer, Thomas Hardy, Elgar, cricket, the English landscape and the Pre-Raphaelites.

The group define a "ruralist" as "someone who is from the city who moves to the country". The Brotherhood came to wide public attention following a BBC TV documentary, Summer with the Brotherhood, which was broadcast in 1977.

== Style ==
Unlike the Pre-Raphaelite Brotherhood, the group did not promote (nor adhere to) a manifesto. Each artist's own techniques and work remains diverse with a common evocation of a mystical response to the observance of nature and rural life. Some of their output is intensely personal and sometimes surrealist in arrangement. Nevertheless, they expressed a common dissatisfaction with abstraction and radical avant-gardism in art. Ovenden expressed distaste for the abstract New York School, which he described as "at best decorative and at worst little different from ... neurotic daubings."

In turn, supporters of avant-garde art condemned their work as sentimental and nostalgic. Critic Tom Lubbock objected that "they didn't see that their imagination of mystical, deep, England had already been fully colonised by commercial imagery. Their pristine visions of an unfallen world came straight from a pretty advert for soap or air-freshener."

== Later history ==
The group's work was very widely disseminated when the Arden Shakespeare commissioned illustrations from its members depicting characters from Shakespeare, to be used on the cover of the Arden editions of each of Shakespeare's plays.

After six years the group lost some of its members. By 1984 David Inshaw, Jann Haworth and Peter Blake had left. The remaining four members continued the group, sometimes joined by Blake. They maintain an exhibitions programme both in the West Country and London, and are members of the Arts Club. They were guest artists at the Stuckists Real Turner Prize Show 2000.

Recent exhibitions have included work by both present and past members.
