= Jann Haworth =

British-American pop artist (born 1942)

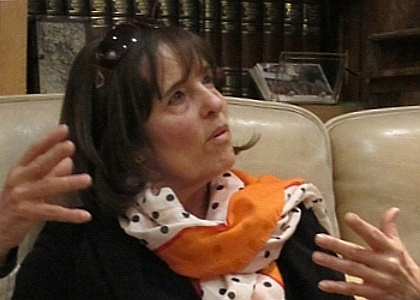
Haworth in 2012

Jann Haworth (born 1942) is a British-American pop artist. A pioneer of soft sculpture, she is best known as the co-creator of the Beatles' 1967 Sgt. Pepper's Lonely Hearts Club Band album cover. Haworth is also an advocate for feminist rights especially for the representation of women in the art world.

== Life and work ==
=== Early years ===
Haworth was born in 1942 and raised in Hollywood, California. Her mother Miriam Haworth was a distinguished ceramist, printmaker, and painter. Her father, Ted Haworth, was an Academy Award-winning art director. Since Haworth was surrounded by artistic talent from a young age, she describes the experience as having a strong influential impact on the development of her artistic goals and the presentations of her artworks-whether they were installation pieces or two dimensional:

My mother taught me how to sew. I was eight when I made my first petticoat, and from that point on I made dolls, their clothing and almost everything I wore. My father was a Hollywood production designer. I shadowed him on the sets. This influenced my work in the 1960s. I thought of the installations that I did as film sets. The concept of the stand-in, the fake, the dummy, the latex model as surrogates for the real, came from being with my father. —Jann Haworth

After years of experimental artwork as a young artist, Jann Haworth took her talents to the University of California, Los Angeles in 1959.

=== 1960s ===
After two years at UCLA, she moved in 1961 to London, England, where she studied art history at the Courtauld Institute of Art and studio art at the Slade School of Fine Art. Haworth reveled in being a rebellious woman artist within a conservative, male-dominated institution like the Slade.

I liked the Slade’s fustiness; it was another thing to push against...The assumption was that, as one tutor put it, "the girls were there to keep the boys happy". He prefaced that by saying "it wasn’t necessary for them to look at the portfolios of the female students…they just needed to look at their photos". From that point, it was head-on competition with the male students. I was annoyed enough, and American enough, to take that on. I was determined to better them, and that’s one of the reasons for the partly sarcastic choice of cloth, latex and sequins as media. It was a female language to which the male students didn’t have access. —Jann Haworth

Haworth began experimenting with sewn and stuffed soft sculptures. She made still life items (flowers, doughnuts) and progressed to her "Old Lady" doll and other life-sized figures. Her work often contained specific references to American culture and to Hollywood in particular, as in her dummies of Mae West, Shirley Temple and W. C. Fields.

Haworth soon became a leading figure of the British Pop Art movement, and joined Pauline Boty as one of its only female practitioners in London. Her first major exhibition was at the Institute of Contemporary Arts in 1963, where she was selected to participate in 4 Young Artists (18 September – 19 October 1963) alongside British artists John Howlin, Brian Mills, and John Pearson. Three shows at the Robert Fraser Gallery in London followed, two of which were solo exhibitions. Her work was seen in Amsterdam and Milan and also was featured in the Hayward Gallery's landmark exhibition of Pop Art in 1968. That same year, she and her then-husband, Pop artist Peter Blake, won a Grammy for their album cover design of the Beatles' Sgt. Pepper's Lonely Hearts Club Band.

==== Sgt. Pepper's Lonely Hearts Club Band ====
Gallery owner Robert Fraser suggested to the Beatles that they commission Blake and Haworth to design the cover for Sgt. Pepper's Lonely Hearts Club Band. The original concept was to have the Beatles dressed in their new "Northern brass band" uniforms appearing at an official ceremony in a park. For the crowd gathered at this imaginary event, John Lennon, Paul McCartney, and George Harrison, as well as Haworth, Blake, and Fraser, listed of characters they wanted in attendance. Blake and Haworth then pasted life-size, black-and-white photographs of all the approved characters onto hardboard, which Haworth hand-tinted. Haworth added several cloth dummies to the assembly, including one of her "Old Lady" figures and a Shirley Temple doll who wears a "Welcome The Rolling Stones" sweater. Inspired by the municipal flower-clock in Hammersmith, West London, Haworth also came up with the idea of writing out the name of the band in civic flower-bed lettering.

=== 1970s to today ===
In the 1970s, she and Blake were members of the Brotherhood of Ruralists, a group of artists that also included Ann and Graham Arnold, Annie and Graham Ovenden, and David Inshaw. In 1979 she founded and ran The Looking Glass School near Bath, Somerset, an arts-and-crafts primary and middle school. In the same year, she separated from Blake and commenced living with her present husband, the writer Richard Severy. During the subsequent two decades, her artistic career took second place to her commitment to raising a young family (two daughters, three stepdaughters, and a son). Still, she found time to illustrate (as Karen Haworth) six of Severy's books: Mystery Pig (1983), Unicorn Trap (1984), Rat's Castle (1985), High Jinks (1986), Burners and Breakers (1987), and Sea Change (1987). She also created five covers for the 1981 Methuen Arden Shakespeare editions of Richard III, Macbeth, Twelfth Night, Henry the Fifth, and Coriolanus. Haworth also authored three "how-to" art books for children: Paint (1993), Collage (1994), and Painting and Sticking (with Miriam Haworth, 1995).

After mounting two solo exhibitions at Gimpel fils, London, in the mid-1990s, Haworth won a fellowship in 1997 to study American quilt-making. She returned to the United States and took up residence in Sundance, Utah, where she founded the Art Shack Studios and Glass Recycling Works, and co-founded the Sundance Mountain Charter School (now the Soldier Hollow Charter School). Since then, her career has exhibited in solo exhibitions at the Mayor Gallery, London (2006), Wolverhampton Art Gallery (2007), and Galerie du Centre, Paris (2008). She also has been represented in numerous Pop art retrospectives, including "Pop Art UK" (Modena, 2004), "Pop Art and the 60s: This Was Tomorrow" (London, 2004), "Pop Art! 1956-1968" (Rome, 2007), and "Seductive Subversion: Women Pop Artists, 1958-1968" (Philadelphia, 2009).

==== SLC PEPPER ====
In 2004, Haworth began work on SLC PEPPER, a 50-feet × 30-feet civic wall mural in downtown Salt Lake City, Utah, representing an updated version of the Sgt. Pepper's Lonely Hearts Club Band album cover. Haworth said "The original album cover, famous though it is, is an icon ready for the iconoclast. We will be turning the original inside out... ethnic and gender balancing, and evaluating for contemporary relevance." Together with over thirty local, national, and international artists of all ages, Haworth created a set of "heroes and heroines of the 21st century" in stencil graffiti, replacing each of the personalities depicted in the original. Only the Beatles' jackets remain as metal cut-outs with head and hand holes so that visitors may "become part of the piece" by taking souvenir photos. The first phase of the mural's construction was completed in 2005. SLC PEPPER remains an ongoing arts project, where local artists will continue to add to its design.

== Selected exhibitions ==
=== Solo exhibitions ===
- 1966 Robert Fraser Gallery, London
- 1966 Gallerie 20, Amsterdam
- 1968 Studio Marconi, Milan
- 1969 Robert Fraser Gallery, London
- 1971 "New Sculpture by Jann Haworth" Sidney Janis Gallery, New York City
- 1972 Arnolfini, Bristol
- 1974 Waddington Galleries, London
- 1993, 1995 Gimpel fils, London
- 2000 Sundance Screening Room, Utah
- 2006 "Jann Haworth: Artist's Cut" - Mayor Gallery, London
- 2008 "Jann Haworth" - Galerie du Centre, Paris
- 2009 "POP Jann Haworth" - Wolverhampton Art Gallery, UK
- 2017 "Never The Less" Emmanuel Art Gallery at the University of Colorado Denver - Denver, Colorado
- 2019-20 "Jann Haworth: Close Up" Pallant House Gallery, Chichester

=== Group exhibitions ===
- 1963 "Four Young Artists" - Institute of Contemporary Arts, London
- 1963 "Young Contemporaries" - RBA Galleries, London
- 1968 "Works from 1956 to 1967" - Robert Fraser Gallery, London
- 1968 "Pop Art" - Hayward Gallery, London
- 1970 "Figures/Environments" - Walker Art Center, Minneapolis [traveling exhibition]
- 1972 "Sharp-Focus Realism by 28 Painters and Sculptors" - Sidney Janis Gallery, New York City
- 1994 "Worlds in a Box: Cornell, Fluxus, Herms, LeWitt, Samara" - Whitechapel Gallery, London
- 2004 "Pop Art UK: British Pop Art, 1958-1972" - Galleria Civica di Modena, Italy
- 2004 "Art and the 60s: This Was Tomorrow" - Tate Britain, London
- 2005 "British Pop" - Museo de Bellas Artes de Bilbao, Spain
- 2007 "Pop Art! 1956-1968" - Scuderie del Quirinale, Rome
- 2010 "Seductive Subversion: Women Pop Artists, 1958-1968" - University of the Arts, Philadelphia [traveling exhibition]
- 2013 "Work to Do: Trent Alvey, Pam Bowman, Jann Haworth, Amy Jorgensen" - Brigham Young University Museum of Art, Utah

== Public collections ==
- Arts Council of Great Britain
- Hirshhorn Museum and Sculpture Garden, Washington DC
- Walker Art Center, Minneapolis, MN
- Museum Folkwang, Essen, Germany
- São Paulo Museum of Modern Art, Brazil
- Sintra Museum of Modern Art-Berardo Collection, Portugal
- Pallant House Gallery, West Sussex, England
- Wolverhampton Art Gallery, Wolverhampton, England
- Utah Museum of Fine Arts, Salt Lake City, Utah

== Awards ==
- 1967 Edinburgh 400 Prize winner
- 1968 Grammy Award - Best Album Cover, Graphic Arts, shared with Peter Blake for Sgt. Pepper's Lonely Hearts Club Band
- 1997 Churchill Fellowship specially designated Robert Fraser Award

== Bibliography ==
Books

- Image as Language, Christopher Finch (1969, Pelican)
- Goodbye Baby and Amen by David Bailey and Peter Evans (1969, Coward-McCann Inc. New York), p 44
- Pop Art Re-defined by John Russell and Suzi Gablik (1969, Frederick A Praeger Inc. New York), plates 11, 43 and 126
- Pop Art: An Illustrated Dictionary by Jose Pierre (1977, Eyre Methuen).
- The Brotherhood of Ruralists, Nicholas Isherwood (1981, Lund Humphries, London) pp 42, 49-50 and 65
- Pop Art, Tilman Osterwold (1989, Cosmo Press, Cologne) p 42
- Pop Art, A Continuing History, Marco Livingstone (1990, Thames and Hudson, London) pp 166, 168-9, 257-8, 236-238
- Blinds and Shutters, Michael Cooper and Bryan Roylance (1990, Genesis, Guildford, England) pp 53, 55, 58, 114, 188, 238-9, 262-3 and 267
- Walker Art Center – Painting and Sculpture from the Collection Martin L Friedman (1990, Rizzoli International Publications)
- Summer of Love, George Martin (1994, Macmillan, London)
- Small Histories : Studies of Western Art, N.P. James (CV Publications, 2007)

Exhibition catalogues

- Sharp Focus Realism (Sidney Janis Gallery, New York, 1972), p 13
- The Pop 60's: Transatlantic Crossing (Centro Cultural de Belem, Portugal, 1997), pp 156–7
- Pop Art UK 1956-72 (Galleria Civica di Modena, Italy, 2004), pp 102 and 179, plates 103 and 105
- Art and the Sixties: This was Tomorrow (Tate Britain, 2004), pp 13, 25, 137 and plate 24
- British Pop (Museo de Bellas Artes, Bilbao, Spain, 2005), pp 422 and 466, plates 163, 167 and 171
- Artist's Cut: Jann Haworth (Mayor Gallery, London, 2006)
- Pop Art! 1956-1968 (Scuderie del Quirinale, Rome, 2007), pp 140 and 291, plate 32
- POP Jann Haworth (Wolverhampton Art Gallery, Wolverhampton, 2009)
