= Howard Grey =

British photographer

- Born: 1942 (age 83–84)
- Education: Douglas High School for Boys, Isle of Man (1953–1958); Leicester School of Art (1958–1959); Ealing School Of Photography (1959 -1961)
- Spouse: Isabelle Anscombe (m. 1982) Margaret "Mog" Scott-Stewart (m. 2009)
- Children: Camilla X. Grey (b.1984)
- Parents: Abraham Graber "Alf Grey" (1904–1999) (father); Hetty Cogan (1909–1994) (mother)
- Relatives: Alma Cogan (Singer) 1932–1966
- Website: howardgrey.com

Howard Grey (born May 24,1942) is a British photographer. He is known for his photographs of the arrival of the last West Indian migrants at Waterloo Station, London, before the Commonwealth Immigrants Act 1962 came into force.

== Life and work ==
Grey was born in Slough. His father, Alf Grey, was a studio portrait and seaside holiday photographer who gave Howard, then aged six, a Zeiss Ikon Baby Box camera. Grey studied photography at Leicester College of Art (1957–1958), and Ealing School of Photography, London (1958–1960), then worked as an assistant photographer at Woburn Studios. He set up a studio in Knightsbridge, London, and worked as a commercial photographer on fashion and TV commercial assignments between 1963 and 1969 in the UK and elsewhere. In the 1980s he created stock photographs for Getty Images.

From January 1962 to November 1969, Grey was working out of Ewart & Company, a television commercial company at 48 Glebe Place in London's Chelsea. Here Grey was employed as an occasional assistant in what was Europe's first production company to devote themselves exclusively to making TV commercials. To further his ambition of becoming a freelance advertising and editorial photographer, in 1969 he purchased his own studio at 1 Studio Place, London SW1. Soon he was working as a stills photographer alongside art directors with advertising agencies, where he collaborated with above-the-line photography.

In the middle 1960s, Grey worked with author and journalist Paul Foot on several investigative works that required photography. One in particular, was when apparent new evidence in the 1962 A6 murder trial had come to light soon after James Hanratty, the convicted murderer of scientist Michael Gregsten, had been executed for the crime. Grey's task was to secretly photograph a character over a period of many months who, according to Foot, was just as likely to have committed the murder as was Hanratty.

In May 1962 Grey took photographs of the arrival of the last West Indian migrants at Waterloo Station, London, before the Commonwealth Immigrants Act 1962 came into force. They were exhibited in London in 2018.

Throughout the 1970s, Grey's experience with the Rolleiflex SL66 medium-format camera attracted the attention of the Rank and Carlton Tower Hotel Groups. For them he frequently achieved through-focus photography of bedrooms and banqueting facilities that, until then, was viable only with bulky studio plate cameras.

In 1974 Academy Editions, London, commissioned Philippe Garner with Grey, to author a seminal book on the decorative arts of Émile Gallé.

In 1976, inspired by a small paper-back book on Bloomsbury by Quentin Bell, Grey spent a day photographing Post Impressionist artist Duncan Grant at the artist's home and studio near Lewes in Sussex. Stunned by Grant and his home's decoration and history, Grey envisaged an illustrated book on the Bloomsbury artists and their world; with author and art and crafts historian Isabelle Anscombe as its writer, Thames & Hudson published Omega & After – Bloomsbury and the Decorative Arts in 1981.

For Weidenfeld & Nicolson, Grey travelled to Philadelphia with the lead singer of The Three Degrees, Sheila Ferguson, to supply all photography for her recipe book Soul Food – Classic Cuisine From The Deep South.

In 1982, Howard Grey co-founded a small production unit called Midnight Television. With producer John Clark, they made the first of a series of bawdy one-hour TV entertainment shows primarily aimed at North Sea Oil-rig workers, and at a time before satellite TV had become readily available. After sales of almost a thousand VHS tapes to the general public, the unit ceased production when the National Union of Mineworkers Pension Fund took control of the unit's distribution company.

In 2023, The Royal Mint introduced a special edition of a 50 pence coin to commemorate the 75th anniversary of the first arrivals of West Indian immigrants to the UK. Later to be known as the Windrush Generation. The presentation package for this issue included a photograph from the photographer's Windrush 1962 series.

== Publications ==
- Howard Grey – 2500 Weekends Ago. Self-published / Blurb, 2014. The Victorians By The Sea. Academy Editions 1973 Howard Grey and Graham Stewart.
- Island. The Store; The Spaces, 2018. By Caruso St John and Marcus Taylor. Includes two short stories by Sam Selvon and photographs by Grey following the Windrush generation and their arrival in London; poetry by Kae Tempest, photographs by Hélène Binet, a contribution by John Akomfrah, a visual essay by the architectural firm Caruso St John, and an essay by Penelope Curtis and other artists who explore the notion of floods such as Dominique Gonzalez-Foerster. Alongside these are found texts by William Shakespeare.

== Exhibitions ==
- In A Different Light, New Acquisitions, Autograph ABP, Rivington Place, London, 2017. Curated by Renée Mussai with Cherelle Sappleton. Group exhibition.
- Black Cultural Archives, Brixton, London, 2018. Solo exhibition.

== Collections ==
- Victoria and Albert Museum, London: salted paper prints

== See also ==
- Francis Hetling
