= The Badminton Game =

1973 painting by David Inshaw

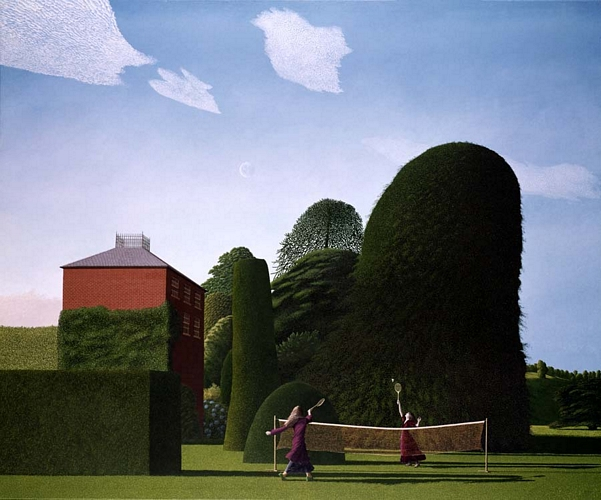
- Artist: David Inshaw
- Year: 1972–1973
- Medium: oil on canvas
- Dimensions: 152.4 cm × 183.5 cm (60.0 in × 72.2 in)
- Location: Tate; London

The Badminton Game is a painting of 1973 by the English painter David Inshaw. It was inspired by the gardens of Devizes and the landscape of Wiltshire. Inshaw has described how the place gave him a feeling of "mystery and wonder". He wrote about the painting: "my main aim was to produce a picture that held a moment in time, but unlike a photograph, which only records an event. I thought a painting could give a more universal, deeper meaning to that moment by composing one instant from lots of different unrelated moments." Its original title was a line from Thomas Hardy's poem "She, to Him": Remembering mine the loss is, not the blame.

The painting was exhibited at the ICA Summer Studio exhibition in London. It has been in the collection of the Tate since 1980. According to The Guardian, it is "one of the most enduringly popular images in the museum's collection". As of 2017, it was not on display.

In 2011 The Badminton Game was the subject of an episode in the BBC series Hidden Paintings of the West.
