= Soft dollar =

The term soft dollars refers to a Wall Street practice, especially in the asset management and securities industries, and means the benefits provided to an asset manager by a broker-dealer as a result of commissions generated from a financial transaction executed by the broker-dealer for client accounts or funds managed by the asset manager. In a soft dollar arrangement, the investment manager directs commissions generated by a client's or fund's transactions to a broker-dealer or other trading venue. Soft dollars, in contrast to hard dollars (actual cash) which have to be reported, are incorporated into brokerage fees and paid expenses, which may not be reported separately (partly due to the difficulty in their valuation). Most investment managers follow the limitations detailed in Section 28(e) of the Securities Exchange Act of 1934. In particular, if soft dollar arrangements are entered into with respect to registered investment companies and pension plans (ERISA and public plans), compliance with Section 28(e) is generally required. However, hedge funds, which are generally not registered, may not be subject to the limitations of Section 28(e) and, thus, in some cases, the fund's commissions may be used for the adviser's benefit. In situations where fund commissions are used outside of the Section 28(e) safe harbor, full and comprehensive disclosure must be provided to fund investors.

== Background and history ==
In the brokerage business, soft dollars have been in use for many years. Prior to May 1, 1975 sometimes referred to as "May Day" all brokerage firms used a fixed price commission schedule published by the New York Stock Exchange; the schedule was a matrix listing the number of shares in the trade on one axis, the stock's price per share on the other axis, and the corresponding commission charge in the cells of the matrix. Because broker/dealers traditionally were required to charge a fixed commission and could not compete by lowering the commission for a trade, they soon began to compete by providing additional services to their institutional clients. In the industry this became known as "bundling" services with commissions.

In the early 1970s, the U.S. government investigated the brokerage industry's pricing practices. They concluded the industry was engaged in price fixing. The government told the brokerage industry that, as of May 1, 1975 it would be required to "fully negotiate" brokerage commissions with each client for each trade. As the May 1, 1975 deadline approached the brokerage industry went through several changes in an attempt to restructure itself so it could offer services and negotiate the price of each service separately. In the industry this process was known as "unbundling". The end of fixed commissions opened the way for discount brokerage. At the same time, the brokerage industry lobbied Congress to allow it to continue to include the cost of investment research given to institutional clients as part of the fully negotiated commission. Shortly after May 1, 1975 Congress passed an amendment to Section 28 of the Securities Exchange Act of 1934. Section 28(e) provides a "safe harbor" for any fiduciary that "pays up" from its fully negotiated commission rate to receive qualifying research or brokerage services from its broker(s).

The Securities and Exchange Commission is responsible for interpreting and enforcing Section 28(e). In Section 28(e) the definition of qualifying services is detailed and explicit, but Section 28(e) is not a rule it is just a "safe harbor". The use of client commissions to pay for services which are not within the safe harbor of Section 28(e) is not within the safe harbor. A fiduciary who "pays up" in client commissions to receive non-qualifying services must be able to defend this practice under applicable law. For pension plans subject to ERISA, a fiduciary can use client assets only for the exclusive benefit of clients and cannot use the client assets for the fiduciary's benefit. Most public pension plans have similar prohibitions. For registered investment companies (such as mutual funds), Section 17(e)(1) of the Investment Company Act of 1940 generally prohibits a fund affiliate—such as the fund adviser—receiving compensation when purchasing or selling property for a registered fund. As a result, for all practical purposes, brokerage arrangements for pension plans and registered investment companies must come within the Section 28(e) safe harbor or run afoul of these restrictions.

Statistical studies over several recent years and large populations of institutional trade data have revealed that the cost of executing and clearing institutional trades is between 1.25 and 1.65 cents per share. Most institutional advisors pay between 3 and 5 cents per share commissions to their brokers. Many of these institutional fiduciaries provide no disclosure of what "services" they are receiving for the excess over their fully negotiated commission rate. In bundled full service brokerage arrangements this lack of disclosure is particularly problematic because it makes it difficult to apply Section 28(e) tests and measure Section 28(e) compliance.

David Swensen, manager of the Yale University endowment, was highly critical of soft dollar arrangements. Swensen wrote,

"Beneath the open, honest discussion concerning marketable equity fee arrangements lie hidden soft dollar payments, representing old-fashioned kickbacks designed to increase investment advisor cash flow at the direct expense of investor clients... Paying inflated commissions to trade securities, for whatever purpose, reduces investment returns. The reduction in return comes straight from the investor’s pocket. The benefit, in the form of goods and services, accrues directly to the fund manager. Because the costs of soft-dollar goods and services would otherwise have come from the fund’s management fee, soft dollars represent nothing other than a well-disguised increase in management fees. Wall Street benefits at the investor’s expense... Why do market participants tolerate the inefficiencies involved in paying inflated prices for trading securities and then receiving rebates in the form of goods and services? The answer lies in the lack of transparency of the process, which allows money managers to profit in an opaque manner. Were the soft-dollar charges as transparent as the highly visible management fees, the investment management industry would have no use for soft dollars... One of the most outrageous 'legitimate' uses of soft dollars involves payoffs made by investment advisors to consulting firms... Soft-dollar activity flies in the face of reasonable governance. Investment advisors employ soft dollars to pay off consulting firms and increase investment management revenues, relying on the technique’s opacity to hide from view. Fund managers incur frictional costs to pursue initiatives with directed commissions for which “hard” dollars are unavailable, frustrating the intentions of fund fiduciaries. Soft dollars and directed brokerage, the slimy underbelly of the brokerage world, ought to be banned."

Swensen described several attempts to reform the soft dollar system. Arthur Levitt, SEC chairman from 1993 to 2001, wrote in 1995: “Soft-dollar arrangements can create substantial conflicts of interest between an advisor and its clients. For example, advisors may cause their clients to pay excessive commission rates, or may overtrade their clients’ accounts simply to satisfy soft-dollar obligations. Soft-dollar arrangements may also result in inferior executions when advisors direct trades to the wrong broker to satisfy a soft-dollar obligation." A February 1995 proposal by the SEC to require managers to disclose soft dollar arrangements was not implemented. Another review in 1998 did not lead to reform. Christopher Cox, SEC chairman from 2005 to 2009, argued in May 1997 for reform or repeal of the "safe harbor" regulations.

In 2018, the European Union banned Soft Dollar payments for research, as part of Mifid II.

== Examples ==
Lets assume that ABC Capital needs ongoing access to the daily closing prices of certain securities, and receives this data from XYZ Database Services, a subsidiary of XYZ Brokerage. If an outsider would pay $12,000 per year (paid in hard cash), yet ABC directs his broker to reduce his commissions that would have been charged to XYZ, then XYZ receives $12,000. "The only one who is out any real money is the broker."

An example of illegal use of undisclosed soft dollars might be when a mutual fund manager pays commissions to a broker-dealer and in return the broker-dealer provides furniture for the fund adviser's use. Likewise, the adviser to a registered mutual fund cannot send brokerage to a wire-house for providing "shelf space" and marketing favoritism for the family of funds. Such brokerage arrangements, where favors are traded in exchange for institutional clients' excess commissions have been criticized by securities regulators. Full-service brokerage bundled commission arrangements involving the exchange of brokerage firms' undisclosed proprietary services provided for institutional clients' brokerage commissions (paid in excess of a fully negotiated execution-only commission rate) can create conflicts of interest. The lack of transparency in these full-service brokerage arrangements may shield abuses from immediate detection.

In soft dollar arrangements, the brokerage commissions are generally higher than they would be for an "execution only" trading relationship, and over time investment performance may suffer by the higher commission cost. Because institutional funds can trade a significant number of shares every day, the soft dollars add up quickly. Over time, investment performance may deteriorate if the soft dollars are not used to purchase research that enhances performance. However, many believe that as long as full disclosure is made, clients will gravitate to managers that use an appropriate mix of soft dollar and other arrangements.

In the US, although soft dollar transactions have incurred a lot of scrutiny lately, the practice is still allowed.

== Similar terminology ==
In Australia, soft dollars are not illegal although they are discouraged and must be disclosed in plain language terms to clients. Many other jurisdictions also regulate soft dollars—sometime called "soft commissions," including the United Kingdom, Canada, Hong Kong, Singapore, Ireland, and France.

In 1977, the New York Times used a headline Soft Dollars and Hard Economics to refer to a situation it described as a "declining dollar."
