= Peter Blake (artist) =

English artist (born 1932)

Sir Peter Blake CBE RDI RA
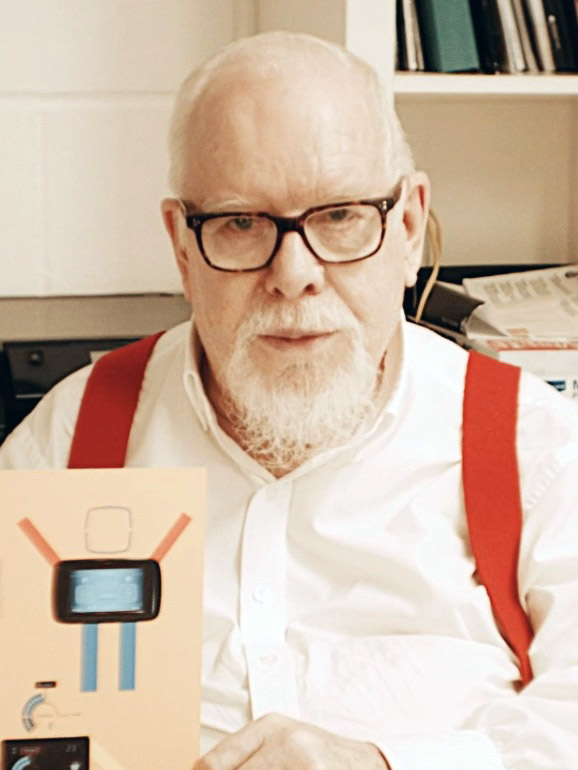
- Blake in 2016
- Born: Peter Thomas Blake; 25 June 1932 (age 94); Dartford, Kent, England
- Education: Royal College of Art
- Occupation: Artist
- Known for: Painting, printmaking, collage
- Notable work: Self-Portrait with Badges, 1961
- Movement: Pop art
- Spouses: Jann Haworth (m. 1963; div. 1979); Chrissy Wilson (m. 1987)
- Children: 3

Sir Peter Thomas Blake CBE RDI RA (born 25 June 1932) is an English pop artist. He co-created the sleeve design for the Beatles' 1967 album Sgt. Pepper's Lonely Hearts Club Band. His other works include the covers for two of the Who's albums, the cover of the Band Aid single "Do They Know It's Christmas?", and the Live Aid concert poster. Blake also designed the 2012 Brit Award statuette.

Blake is a prominent figure in the pop art movement. Central to his paintings is his interest in images from popular culture, which have infused his collages. In 2002 he was knighted at Buckingham Palace for his services to art.

== Early life ==
Peter Blake was born in Dartford, Kent, on 25 June 1932. He was educated at the Gravesend Technical College school of art, and the Royal College of Art.

== Career ==
From the late 1950s, Blake's paintings included imagery from advertisements, music hall entertainment, and wrestlers, often including collaged elements. Blake was included in group exhibitions at the Institute of Contemporary Arts. In the "Young Contemporaries" exhibition of 1961 in which he exhibited alongside David Hockney and R. B. Kitaj, he was first identified with the emerging British Pop Art movement. Blake won the (1961) John Moores junior award for Self Portrait with Badges. He came to wider public attention when, along with Pauline Boty, Derek Boshier and Peter Phillips, he featured in Ken Russell's Monitor film on pop art, Pop Goes the Easel, broadcast on BBC television in 1962. From 1963, Blake was represented by Robert Fraser placing him at the centre of Swinging London and bringing him into contact with leading figures of popular culture. Blake had his first solo exhibition with Robert Fraser Gallery in 1965 and appeared on the front cover of LIFE International in a photograph by Lord Snowdon. Blake was given the final exhibition held at Robert Fraser Gallery which closed in 1969. The same year, Blake had his first exhibition with Waddington Galleries, owned by Leslie Waddington who became his lifelong supporter and representative. In 1999, Blake painted Leslie Waddington with Portrait of a Young Man by Hans Memling.

Blake participated in Prince Edward's charity television special The Grand Knockout Tournament in 1987.

== Work ==
On the Balcony, 1955–1957, Tate Gallery

The First Real Target, 1961, Tate Gallery

On the Balcony (1955–1957) is a significant early work which remains an iconic piece of British Pop Art, showing Blake's interest in combining images from pop culture with fine art. The work, which appears to be a collage but is wholly painted, shows, among other things, a boy on the left of the composition holding Édouard Manet's The Balcony, badges and magazines. It was inspired by a painting by Honoré Sharrer depicting workers holding famous paintings, Workers and Paintings. At the "Pop Art in Changing Britain" exhibit and as reported by The Telegraph on 21 February 2018, his Girls with Their Hero, a 1959 painting of facets of Elvis Presley was said to have "fashioned a highly personal form of Pop Art, infused by nostalgia for Victoriana and a long-lost world of native pastimes". Blake has referred to the work of other artists many times. His Captain Webb Matchbox, based on a Bryant & May matchbox design featuring the first man to swim the Channel unaided, is another of his early works in the pop art movement. Another example, The First Real Target (1961) a standard archery target with the title written across the top is a play on paintings of targets by Kenneth Noland and Jasper Johns.

Blake has been commissioned to create many album sleeves. He designed the sleeve for Sgt. Pepper's Lonely Hearts Club Band with his wife Jann Haworth, the American-born artist whom he married in 1963 and divorced in 1979. The Sgt. Pepper sleeve won Blake and Haworth a Grammy Award for Best Album Cover, Graphic Arts and has become one of the most iconic and imitated pieces of album artwork. Producing the collage necessitated the construction of a set with cut-out photographs and objects, such as flowers, centred on a drum (sold in auction in 2008) with the title of the album. Blake has subsequently complained about the one-off fee he received for the design (£200), with no subsequent royalties. Blake made sleeves for the Band Aid single, "Do They Know It's Christmas?" (1984), Paul Weller's Stanley Road (1995) and the Ian Dury tribute album Brand New Boots and Panties (2001; Blake was Dury's tutor at Walthamstow School of Art in the early 60s). He designed the sleeves for Pentangle's Sweet Child, The Who's Face Dances (1981), which features portraits of the band by a number of artists, and 38 years later, The Who's WHO (2019).

In 1968, commissioned by Dodo Editions, Blake made Babe Rainbow, a screen-print on tinplate, in an edition of 10,000, which sold for £1 each.

In 1969, Blake left London to live near Bath. His work changed direction to feature scenes based on English Folklore and characters from Shakespeare. In the early 1970s, he made a set of watercolour paintings to illustrate Lewis Carroll's Through the Looking-Glass using a young artist, Celia Wanless, as the model for Alice and in 1975 he was a founder of the Brotherhood of Ruralists. Blake moved back to London in 1979 and his work returned to earlier popular culture references.

In 1990 and 1991, Blake painted the artwork to Eric Clapton's 1991 million-selling live album 24 Nights. A scrapbook featuring all of Blake's drawing was later released. In January 1992, Blake appeared on BBC2's acclaimed Arena Masters of the Canvas documentary and painted the portrait of the wrestler Kendo Nagasaki.

In June 2006, as The Who returned to play Leeds University 36 years after recording their seminal Live at Leeds album in 1970, Blake unveiled a Live at Leeds 2 artwork to commemorate the event. The artist and The Who's Pete Townshend signed an edition which will join the gallery's collection. More recently, Blake has created artist's editions for the opening of the Pallant House Gallery which houses collections of his most famous paintings. The works are homages to his earlier work on the Stanley Road album cover and Babe Rainbow prints. He designed a series of deck chairs.

In 2006, Blake designed the cover for Oasis greatest hits album Stop the Clocks. According to Blake, he chose all of the objects in the picture at random, but the sleeves of Sgt. Pepper's and Definitely Maybe were in the back of his mind. He claims, "It's using the mystery of Definitely Maybe and running away with it." Familiar cultural icons which can be seen on the cover include Dorothy from Wizard of Oz, Michael Caine (replacing the original image of Marilyn Monroe, which could not be used for legal reasons) and the seven dwarfs from Snow White and the Seven Dwarfs. Blake revealed that the final cover wasn't the original which featured an image of the shop 'Granny Takes a Trip' on the Kings Road in Chelsea, London.

Blake created an updated version of Sgt. Pepper—with famous figures from Liverpool history—for the campaign for Liverpool to become European Capital of Culture in 2008, and created a series of prints to celebrate Liverpool's status. In 2008, Blake painted a pig for the public art event King Bladud's Pigs in Bath in the city of Bath.

A fan of Chelsea Football Club, Blake designed a collage to promote the team's home kit in 2010. He also designed a shopping bag for the Lucky Brand Jeans company for the holiday season.

As part of 'The Big Egg Hunt' February 2012 Sir Peter Blake designed an egg on behalf of Dorchester Collection. Blake created the carpet which runs through the Supreme Court of the United Kingdom's Middlesex Guildhall building.

As he approached his 80th birthday, Blake undertook a project to recreate the Sgt. Pepper album cover with images of British cultural icons of his life that he most admires. He stated: "I had a very long list of people who I wanted to go in but couldn't fit everyone in – I think that shows how strong British culture and its legacy of the last six decades is." The new version was created for a special birthday celebration of Blake's life at fashion designer Wayne Hemingway's Vintage festival at Boughton House, Northamptonshire in July 2012.

An exhibition was held at Pallant House Gallery in Chichester to celebrate the artist's long associations with music called Peter Blake and Pop Music (23 June to 7 October 2012). In 2014, he exhibited his illustrations inspired by Under Milk Wood at National Museum Cardiff. In 2016, Blake designed the artwork for Eric Clapton's studio album I Still Do.

In March 2020, Blake's poster London Stands Together was distributed in every copy of London's Evening Standard newspaper.

== Honours ==
Blake became a Royal Academician in 1981. He was appointed Commander of the Order of the British Empire in the 1983 Birthday Honours and Knight Bachelor in the 2002 Birthday Honours for his services to art. Blake was knighted by Prince Charles (now King Charles) in an investiture ceremony at Buckingham Palace. Retrospectives of Blake's work were held at the Tate in 1983 and Tate Liverpool in 2008. In February 2005, the Sir Peter Blake Music Art Gallery, located in the School of Music, University of Leeds, was opened by the artist. The permanent exhibition features 20 examples of Blake's album sleeve art, including the only public showing of a signed print of his Sgt. Pepper's artwork.

In March 2011, Blake was awarded an honorary DMus from the University of Leeds, and marked by the public unveiling of his artwork for the Boogie For Stu album. On 18 July 2011, Blake was awarded an honorary degree for Doctor of Art from Nottingham Trent University. In 2014 he was made an honorary academician at the Royal West of England Academy, Bristol.

== Solo exhibitions ==
- 1962 Portal Gallery, London
- 1965 Robert Fraser Gallery, London
- 1977 Waddington and Tooth Galleries, London
- 1983 Tate Gallery, London
- 1987 Watermans Art Centre, Brentford and Turnpike Gallery, Leigh
- 1996 Now We Are 64: Peter Blake at the National Gallery, The National Gallery, London
- 2000 Peter Blake: About Collage, Tate Liverpool
- 2005 1 to 10 (Collages, Constructions, Drawings & Sculpture) & The Marcel Duchamp Paintings, Waddington Galleries, London
- 2007 Peter Blake: A Retrospective, Tate Liverpool and Museo de Bellas Artes de Bilbao, Spain
- 2011 Peter Blake: A Museum for Myself, Holburne Museum, Bath
- 2013 Llareggub: Peter Blake Illustrates Dylan Thomas's Under Milk Wood, National Museum, Cardiff
- 2015 Peter Blake: Portraits and People, Waddington Custot Galleries, London
- 2018 Peter Blake: A Life in Drawings and Watercolours, Waddington Custot, London
- 2019 Peter Blake: The Artist's Studio, Garth Greenan Gallery, New York
- 2021 Peter Blake: Time Traveller, Waddington Custot, London

== Personal life ==
Blake was married to the American-born artist Jann Haworth from 1963 to 1979, and they had two daughters together, Liberty and Daisy. In 1980, Blake met fellow artist Chrissy Wilson, they married in 1987, and have a daughter, Rose.

Blake has lived in Chiswick, London, since 1967. His "vast" studio there is a former ironmonger's warehouse.

== Bibliography ==
- 1983: Peter Blake by Michael Compton, Nicholas Usherwood and Robert Melville (art critic) (Tate Gallery)
- 1986: Peter Blake by Marina Vaizey (Weidenfeld & Nicolson)
- 1991: 24 Nights by Eric Clapton – scrapbook by Peter Blake (Genesis Publications)
- 2000: Peter Blake: About Collage by Lewis Biggs, Natalie Rudd and Dawn Ades (Tate Liverpool)
- 2003: Peter Blake by Natalie Rudd (Tate Publishing)
- 2009: That Lucky Old Sun by Brian Wilson – 12 limited edition prints by Peter Blake (Genesis Publications)
- 2009: Peter Blake: One Man Show by Marco Livingstone (Lund Humphries)
- 2011: A Museum for Myself by Peter Blake – Published by Holburne Museum to accompany an exhibition held from 14 May to 4 September 2011
- 2021: Peter Blake: Collage by Patrick Elliott and Natalie Rudd, foreword by David Hockney (Thames & Hudson / Waddington Custot)

== See also ==
- Middlesex Guildhall
- Sgt. Pepper's Lonely Hearts Club Band
- What Do Artists Do All Day?
