= One Fierce Beer Coaster =

1996 studio album by Bloodhound Gang

Studio album by Bloodhound Gang
- Released: December 3, 1996
- Recorded: March–June 1996
- Genres: Alternative rock; rap rock; funk metal
- Length: 63:57
- Labels: Republic; Cheese Factory; Geffen
- Producer: Jimmy Pop

Bloodhound Gang chronology
Use Your Fingers (1995)	One Fierce Beer Coaster (1996)	Hooray for Boobies (1999)

Singles from One Firece Beer Coaster
- 1. "Fire Water Burn" Released: February 9, 1997; 2. "I Wish I Was Queer So I Could Get Chicks" Released: June 8, 1997; 3. "Why's Everybody Always Pickin' on Me?" Released: December 7, 1997

One Fierce Beer Coaster is the second studio album by American band Bloodhound Gang, released on December 3, 1996. Produced by Jimmy Pop, it was the band's first release on Geffen Records, and the first to feature "Evil" Jared Hasselhoff on bass guitar, and DJ Q-Ball on the turntables. The music of One Fierce Beer Coaster encompasses a number of genres, and its lyrics are rife with toilet humor.

One Fierce Beer Coaster was initially released by the independent label Republic Records before being re-released by Geffen Records due to underground popularity. The album has received mixed to moderately favorable reviews. Three singles were released from the album, including "Fire Water Burn", "I Wish I Was Queer So I Could Get Chicks", and "Why's Everybody Always Pickin' on Me?" The first single, "Fire Water Burn", was a modern rock hit, landing on nine national charts.

== Background and development ==
The Bloodhound Gang began as a small alternative band from King of Prussia, Pennsylvania. The band took its name from "The Bloodhound Gang", a segment on the 1980s PBS kids' show 3-2-1 Contact that featured three young detectives solving mysteries and fighting crime. The band comprised Jimmy Pop, Daddy Long Legs, M.S.G., Lupus Thunder, and Skip O'Pot2Mus. In April 1994, the band released their second demo tape, The Original Motion Picture Soundtrack to Hitler's Handicapped Helpers (1994). This earned the band a record deal with Cheese Factory Records, which was later renamed Republic Records. Later that year, the Bloodhound Gang released their first EP, Dingleberry Haze (1994).

In March 1995, the group signed to Columbia Records and released their first full-length album, titled Use Your Fingers (1995), but they were subsequently dropped by the label. At this time, Daddy Long Legs and M.S.G., who were angry with Columbia Records, left the band to form another rap group, Wolfpac. Bass player Evil Jared Hasselhoff, drummer Spanky G, and turntablist D.J. Q-Ball joined Bloodhound Gang as replacements. In addition, Skip O'Pot2Mus eventually left to pursue a career outside of the music industry.

== Music ==
The Bloodhound Gang entered Dome Sound/Ultra Psyche Studios with engineer Rich Gavalis in March 1996 to record One Fierce Beer Coaster. All of the songs were produced by Jimmy Pop, who also mixed most of the musical tracks on his personal Macintosh. The album was later mastered by Joe Palmaccio at Sterling Sound Studios in New York City.

=== Style ===
"Fire Water Burn" (sample)
"Fire Water Burn," from the group's 1996 album One Fierce Beer Coaster.

While the album's predecessor, Use Your Fingers, was written and recorded in a more hip-hop-oriented style, featuring distinct rap beats, One Fierce Beer Coaster featured a more alternative-oriented sound. Stephen Thomas Erlewine of AllMusic described the Bloodhound Gang's sound as, "smarmy, smirky alternative funk-metal, complete with junk culture references and "ironic" musical allusions." Former Bloodhound Gang guitarist Lupus Thunder credits Weezer as an inspiration for "Fire Water Burn" and Lemonade and Brownies-era Sugar Ray for "Kiss Me Where It Smells Funny."

When working on the album, Jimmy Pop used the standard hip-hop technique of sampling. The chorus for "Fire Water Burn", for instance, is taken from "The Roof Is on Fire" by Rock Master Scott & the Dynamic Three Likewise, "Why's Everybody Always Pickin' on Me?" is built around a re-recorded sample of "Spooky", by Mike Sharpe as performed by Classics IV and also features a small lift from the Bill Cosby track "Greasy Kid Stuff." Finally, the track "Your Only Friends Are Make Believe" features a chorus melody lifted from the Duran Duran song "Hungry Like the Wolf", and "Lift Your Head Up High (And Blow Your Brains Out)" is built around a sample from "Get Up and Boogie" by the Silver Convention.

=== Lyricism ===
The lyrics for One Fierce Beer Coaster use over-the-top parody and toilet humor as means for comedy. For instance, the album opener, "Kiss Me Where It Smells Funny", is a song about cunnilingus, and it was written by Jimmy Pop about his then-girlfriend. The band's next two albums would each have one song about said girlfriend: "Three Point One Four" and "No Hard Feelings”. "Lift Your Head Up High (And Blow Your Brains Out)" is a dark satire in which the singer encourages the listener to die by suicide. Three minutes into the song, Jimmy Pop says, "Rewind and let me reverse it backwards like Judas Priest first did." Immediately after this, a four-second segment of backwards vocals repeats four times. When played in reverse, this segment says, "Devil shall wake up and eat Chef Boyardee Beefaroni."

The album's best-known single, "Fire Water Burn", is a pop culture-laden track in which Pop alternates between self-deprecation and braggadocio. "I Wish I Was Queer So I Could Get Chicks" plays on the stereotype that that women only like gay men because they are ostensibly better looking and more sensitive than straight men. "Why's Everybody Always Pickin' on Me?" is mainly about how Jimmy Pop was constantly picked on in high school and has since developed an intense fear of being ridiculed.

The album also includes a cover of Run-DMC's "It's Tricky" and "Boom", which features an appearance by Vanilla Ice.

== Release and promotion ==
"[Maverick] really wanted to sign the band in the worst possible way, even to the point where I had to tell Madonna that I couldn’t put her on the phone with Jimmy Pop."

— Brett Alperowitz

One Fierce Beer Coaster was originally released on Republic Records, which, under its earlier name, Cheese Factory Records, had previously released material by the band. As word-of-mouth praise for the album spread, however, Geffen Records signed the band after two months.

The original release contained a song called "Yellow Fever", which was about having sex with Asian women, as well as a hidden track on track number 69 on the original release. It consisted of an audio collage featuring Howard Stern talking about peanut butter, a televangelist, a news broadcast on the disease lupus (a reference to Lüpüs Thünder), a phone call from a drunk friend of Jimmy's, and other assorted oddities. The Geffen re-release omitted this track, although both it and "Yellow Fever" were later released on an EP called One Censored Beer Coaster.

"Fire Water Burn" played a major role in the slow build of interest that ultimately led to the band's mainstream breakthrough. Because the band could not afford financially solvent national tours, they promoted themselves by sending their music to alternative rock-based radio stations across the country. Eventually, an intern brought the band to the attention of the music director of 107.7 The End in Seattle. The director, liking what he heard, played "Fire Water Burn" on his Friday night show. After airing, the station was flooded with phone calls asking about the song and the band and the director passed the song onto the music director at KROQ-FM in Los Angeles. This snowball effect eventually overwhelmed the band with demands for their new record. After hearing of the underground success One Fierce Beer Coaster was receiving, many record labels began courting the band. According to manager Brett Alperowitz in an interview with HitQuarters, Madonna's label Maverick "really wanted to sign the band in the worst possible way, even to the point where I had to tell Madonna that I couldn’t put her on the phone with Jimmy Pop." The band eventually signed a record deal with Geffen Records.

=== Omission of "Yellow Fever" ===
When Geffen Records re-released the album, the label refused to release the song "Yellow Fever" because of its racial lyrical content. As such, the song was removed from Geffen pressings of the album. In response, Jimmy Pop told Yahoo! Launch that his band's music and lyrics were simply meant to be humorous:

I think on the first record there's stuff that [offended people]… Really we're not trying to shock anybody, we're just saying things that we laugh at," he explained. "That was always the idea. The same things that we talk about on the bus are the same things we put on our records. On the first record we had lyrics like, 'There's little children unattended, let me get some poison candy,' which to me, that isn't very good.

In 2000, the song was the subject of further controversy when students at the University of Maryland, including members of the ECAASU and the LGBT Alliance, demanded the band be removed from a concert lineup.

== Touring ==
The band toured throughout 1997 to support the album. During August 1997, they performed at that year's edition of the BIzarre-Festival in Germany, which also featured artists such as Beck, Bush, Faith No More, Foo Fighters, Marilyn Manson, Rammstein, Rollins Band, Silverchair, and Veruca Salt. During their performance at the Bizarre Festival, they covered "The Sweater Song" by Weezer and "Firestarter" by The Prodigy. In September 1997, they performed at that year's edition of The End of Summer Weenie Roast. It took place at the Blockbuster Pavilion in Charlotte, North Carolina, and also featured Cowboy Mouth, Faith No More, K's Choice, Our Lady Peace, Seven Mary Three, and The Nixons. Later that month, they performed at the GrudgeFest festival in Australia, playing alongside Bush, Grinspoon and Veruca Salt. Other artists that the Bloodhound Gang shared bills with in 1997 include Goldfinger, Guano Apes, Iggy Pop, Linda Perry, Nerf Herder, the Reverend Horton Heat, Sevendust, Slipknot, Sugar Ray and Weezer.

== Reception ==
=== Critical reception ===
Professional ratings
Review scores
Source	Rating
AllMusic	3/5 stars
NME	1/10
Robert Christgau	(2-star Honorable Mention)
The Rolling Stone Album Guide	3/5 stars
Spin	5/10

One Fierce Beer Coaster has received mixed reviews. In a three-out-of-five star review, AllMusic critic Stephen Thomas Erlewine wrote that, "One Fierce Beer Coaster was picked up by DGC about two months after its release [...] And, listening to the single, "Fire Water Burn," it's possible to hear why." However, Erlewine also wrote that "what really sinks the album is the revolting, sophomoric humor that passes for lyrics." In his review of the lead single "Fire Water Burn", Entertainment Weekly reviewer Matt Diehl referred to the band's music as "mumbling hip-hop slang with self-conscious Caucasian stiffness." Robert Christgau awarded the album two stars and identified it as an "honorable mention" (i.e., a "likable effort consumers attuned to [the record's] overriding aesthetic or individual vision may well enjoy"), writing that the album was "fighting for [the band's] right to show you their underpants".

=== Chart performance ===
On January 18, 1997, One Fierce Beer Coaster debuted on the Billboard 200 at number 132; it peaked at number 57 less than a month later. On October 16, 1998, the album was certified gold by the Recording Industry Association of America (RIAA), meaning that it had shipped 500,000 copies in the United States.

== Track listing ==
All tracks are written by Jimmy Pop except when noted.

Republic Records version
No.	Title	Writer(s)	Length
1.	"Kiss Me Where It Smells Funny"	Jimmy Pop, Lupus Thunder	3:08
2.	"Lift Your Head Up High (And Blow Your Brains Out)"		4:58
3.	"Fire Water Burn"	Jimmy Pop, Rock Master Scott & the Dynamic Three	4:54
4.	"Yellow Fever"		4:42
5.	"I Wish I Was Queer So I Could Get Chicks"		3:49
6.	"Why's Everybody Always Pickin' on Me?"	Jimmy Pop, Mike Sharpe, Harry Middlebrooks	3:22
7.	"It's Tricky" (Run-DMC cover)	Joseph Simmons, Darryl McDaniels	2:37
8.	"Asleep at the Wheel"		4:05
9.	"Shut Up"	Jimmy Pop, Colin Hay, Ron Strykert	3:15
10.	"Your Only Friends Are Make Believe"	Jimmy Pop, Duran Duran	7:02
11.	"Boom" (featuring Vanilla Ice)	Jimmy Pop, Vanilla Ice	4:06
12.	"Going Nowhere Slow"	Jimmy Pop, Lupus Thunder	4:22
13.	"Reflections of Remoh"		0:53
69.	"Hidden track"		8:00
Total length:			63:57 (With silence)

Geffen Records version
No.	Title	Writer(s)	Length
1.	"Kiss Me Where It Smells Funny"	Jimmy Pop, Lupus Thunder	3:08
2.	"Lift Your Head Up High (And Blow Your Brains Out)"		4:58
3.	"Fire Water Burn"	Jimmy Pop, Rock Master Scott & the Dynamic Three	4:54
4.	"I Wish I Was Queer So I Could Get Chicks"		3:49
5.	"Why's Everybody Always Pickin' on Me?"	Jimmy Pop, Mike Sharpe, Harry Middlebrooks	3:22
6.	"It's Tricky" (Run-DMC cover)	Joseph Simmons, Darryl McDaniels	2:37
7.	"Asleep at the Wheel"		4:05
8.	"Shut Up"		3:15
9.	"Your Only Friends Are Make Believe"	Jimmy Pop, Duran Duran	7:02
10.	"Boom" (featuring Vanilla Ice)	Jimmy Pop, Vanilla Ice	4:06
11.	"Going Nowhere Slow"	Jimmy Pop, Lupus Thunder	4:22
12.	"Reflections of Remoh"		0:53
Total length:			46:15

European version bonus tracks
No.	Title	Note(s)	Length
13.	"Fire Water Burn" (Donkey version)	Censored version of "Fire Water Burn"	4:10
14.	"Fire Water Burn" (Jim Makin' Jamaican mix)	Remix	5:00
Total length:			55:25

== Personnel ==
Adapted from the album booklet.

Band members

- Jimmy Pop – lead vocals, guitar, samples, production
- Lüpüs Thünder – backing vocals, guitar
- Spanky G – drums
- Evil Jared – bass
- DJ Q-Ball – backing vocals, turntables, keys, programming

Guest musicians

- Rob Van Winkle – guest vocals on "Boom"

Production

- Avery Lipman – executive producer
- Monte Lipman – executive producer
- Joseph M. Palmaccio – mastering
- Rich Gavalis – engineer, editing, mixing

== Charts and certifications ==
=== Weekly charts ===
Weekly chart performance for One Fierce Beer Coaster
Chart (1997–2000)	Peak position
Australian Albums (ARIA)	71
Austrian Albums (Ö3 Austria)	11
Canadian Metal Albums (Nielsen Soundscan)	25
Europe (European Top 100 Albums)	53
Dutch Albums (Album Top 100)	18
German Albums (Offizielle Top 100)	14
New Zealand Albums (RMNZ)	3
Swedish Albums (Sverigetopplistan)	20
US Billboard 200	57
US Heatseekers Albums (Billboard)	2

=== Year-end charts ===
Year-end chart performance for One Fierce Beer Coaster
Chart (1997)	Position
New Zealand Albums (RMNZ)	21
Chart (1999)	Position
German Albums (Offizielle Top 100)	44

=== Certifications ===
Certifications for One Fierce Beer Coaster
Region	Certification	Certified units/sales
New Zealand (RMNZ)	Platinum	15,000^{^}
United States (RIAA)	Gold	500,000^{^}
^{^} Shipments figures based on certification alone.

=== Singles ===
Chart performance of singles from One Fierce Beer Coaster
Year	Song	Peak positions							
Year	Song	US Mod	US Main	AUS	NLD	NOR	NZL	SWE	UK
1997	"Fire Water Burn"	18	28	13	7	2	6	6	—
1997	"I Wish I Was Queer So I Could Get Chicks"	—	—	—	—	—	32	—	—
1997	"Why's Everybody Always Pickin' on Me?"	—	—	64	85	—	7	—	56
