= Hooray for Boobies =

Studio album by The Bloodhound Gang
- Released: October 4, 1999
- Studio: Powerhouse Multimedia Studios (Los Angeles)
- Genres: Comedy rock; rap rock
- Length: 60:23
- Labels: Geffen; Republic; Jimmy Franks
- Producers: Jimmy Pop; Richard Gavalis

The Bloodhound Gang chronology
One Fierce Beer Coaster (1996)	Hooray for Boobies (1999)	Hefty Fine (2005)

Singles from Hooray for Boobies
- 1. "Along Comes Mary" Released: May 24, 1999; 2. "The Bad Touch" Released: September 3, 1999; 3. "The Ballad of Chasey Lain" Released: February 14, 2000; 4. "Mope" Released: July 4, 2000; 5. "The Inevitable Return of the Great White Dope" Released: October 16, 2000

Hooray for Boobies is the third studio album by American rock band The Bloodhound Gang. It was released on October 4, 1999, in the United Kingdom and on February 29, 2000, in the United States. Produced by Jimmy Pop and Richard Gavalis, it is the band's second release with Geffen Records after One Fierce Beer Coaster (1996). This was the second and last album to feature drummer Spanky G, who left the band to finish his studies.

The album was a commercial success that generated favorable reviews and brought The Bloodhound Gang into the mainstream consciousness. In the US, it peaked at number 14 on the Billboard 200 chart. It reached number one in Austria and Germany.

Five singles were released from the album: "Along Comes Mary", "The Bad Touch", "The Ballad of Chasey Lain", "Mope", and "The Inevitable Return of the Great White Dope". "The Bad Touch" was listed on 14 charts worldwide, and reached number one on five of them.

== Background and development ==
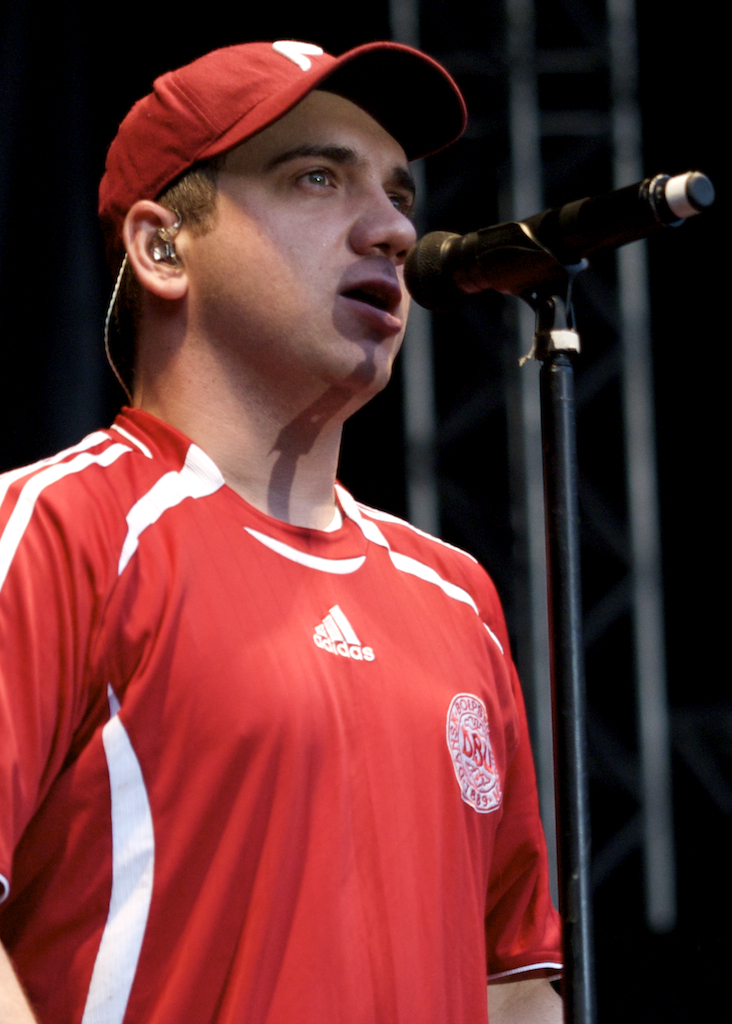
Jimmy Pop, frontman for The Bloodhound Gang

In March 1995, The Bloodhound Gang signed a record deal with Columbia Records and released their debut studio album, Use Your Fingers, that July, but were subsequently dropped by the label. After adjusting its lineup, the group began working on their second album, One Fierce Beer Coaster.

Released on December 3, 1996, it eventually sold over 500,000 copies in the US. The album's first single, "Fire Water Burn", played a major role in the slow build of interest that ultimately led to the band's mainstream breakthrough. Geffen Records signed the band within two months as word-of-mouth praise for the album spread.

== Music ==
=== Style ===
"The Bad Touch" (sample)
"The Bad Touch", from the group's 1999 album Hooray for Boobies.

The album, reminiscent of the band's first album, features various skits in between songs. The first of these skits, entitled "Mama's Boy" is an impromptu phone conversation between Jimmy Pop and his mother. "R.S.V.P." features a short monologue from Vivid pornstar Chasey Lain. "That Cough Came With a Prize" is 15 seconds of coughing. "This Is Stupid" is an arbitrary track performed by the vocal duo who feature in "Right Turn Clyde." Finally, "The Ten Coolest Things About New Jersey" is simply ten seconds of silence. According to the liner notes, Jimmy Pop had to explain the track to band member DJ Q-Ball.

=== Lyricism ===
"A Lap Dance Is So Much Better When the Stripper Is Crying" is a parody of the narrative of Red Sovine's "trucker songs".

== Release and promotion ==
"Right Turn Clyde" features a chorus parodying Pink Floyd's hit single "Another Brick in the Wall Part II"; "All in all you're just another dick with no balls." Because of the issue, the album was delayed in the US. It was eventually resolved and the album was finally released in the US. In Europe, the album was initially released without the song or "Take the Long Way Home", thus containing only 45 CD tracks. Later pressings featured the complete track list. The two tracks were first released on a European CD single of "The Ballad of Chasey Lain" in 2000, prior to the reissue. The original version of "Take the Long Way Home", containing samples of someone saying "May I have your attention please? May I have your attention please?" before the verses and "That's enough. I said that's enough!" at the end of the song, can be heard on the 1999 acetate CD and a 2016 CD reissue of the album. Australian editions of the album only ever contained 45 tracks – the album was never reissued there with the complete track list, however in recent years, US imports with the complete track list have been available for sale in Australian shops.

A "clean" version of the CD was released titled simply Hooray. It featured an alternative cover image of a cow's udder.

The track "The Inevitable Return of the Great White Dope" appeared on the Scary Movie soundtrack.

The track "Magna Cum Nada" appeared in the movie Loser.

A double vinyl version of the album, with the American track listing, was released in 2000 and is currently out of print. A new single vinyl release, on blue vinyl and with the original European track list, was released on July 22, 2016. Neither vinyl release includes the hidden track. A third reissue was announced for February 28, 2020, as a double album, with "Take the Long Way Home" and "Right Turn Clyde", on transparent vinyl. In October 2024, a 25th-anniversary vinyl release was announced, featuring several remixes as bonus tracks.

== Reception ==
=== Critical response ===
Professional ratings
Review scores
Source	Rating
AllMusic	3.5/5 stars
Christgau's Consumer Guide	(dud)
Entertainment Weekly	C
Now	2/5 stars
PopMatters	7/10
Q	2/5 stars
The Rolling Stone Album Guide	2/5 stars
Spin	2/10

Hooray for Boobies received generally positive reviews. Many reviewers complimented the album's duncical, but ultimately enjoyable, humor. AllMusic reviewer Stephen Thomas Erlewine wrote, "on one hand, it's easy to hate the Bloodhound Gang. [...] On the other hand, you almost have to admire the lengths that they go to be, well, defiantly stupid." Many reviewers also complimented the album's eccentric plunderphonic-esque approach to music. PopMatters reviewer Patrick Schabe compared the Bloodhound Gang to Beck, saying, "if anomalous characterization, synthesis, and a popular culture repertoire make Beck the big brother of postmodern music, then surely he's part of a family? If so, then perhaps the Bloodhound Gang are the snotty, juvenile, teenage brother in that family."

Not all reviews were complimentary. Many critics criticized the band for its heavy use of outdated music and its toilet- and sex-based humor. Entertainment Weekly writer Doug Brod decried the album, saying "on Hooray for Boobies these knuckleheads tap into '80s-style metal and New Orderish dance-wave to back their dumbbell odes to oral sex, porn stars, revenge, and – did I mention oral sex?"

=== Commercial performance ===
Hooray for Boobies debuted on the Billboard 200 at number 19 on March 18, 2000. Four weeks later, on April 15, the album peaked at number 14, selling 85,924 copies. 24 weeks later, the album slipped to number 199, and fell out of the chart a week later, having spent a total of 29 weeks there. On May 17, 2000, it was certified both gold and platinum by the Recording Industry Association of America (RIAA) on the same day.

== Track listing ==
All tracks are written by Jimmy Pop, except where noted.

No.	Title	Length
1.	"I Hope You Die"	3:41
2.	"The Inevitable Return of the Great White Dope"	4:02
3.	"Mama's Boy"	0:34
4.	"Three Point One Four"	3:55
5.	"Mope" (writers: Jimmy Pop, Falco, Bolland & Bolland, Frankie Goes to Hollywood, Metallica, Shigeichi Ishimura, Toshio Kai, David X. Cohen)	4:36
6.	"Yummy Down on This" (writers: Jimmy Pop, Lüpüs Thünder, Darrin "Dangerous" Pfeiffer)	3:49
7.	"The Ballad of Chasey Lain"	2:21
8.	"R.S.V.P."	0:15
9.	"Magna Cum Nada"	4:00
10.	"The Bad Touch"	4:20
11.	"That Cough Came with a Prize"	0:14
12.	"Take the Long Way Home"	3:07
13.	"Hell Yeah"	5:02
14.	"Right Turn Clyde" (writers: Jimmy Pop, Roger Waters)	5:24
15.	"This Is Stupid"	0:10
16.	"A Lap Dance Is So Much Better When the Stripper Is Crying"	5:37
17.	"The Ten Coolest Things About New Jersey"	0:10
18.	"Along Comes Mary" (writer: Tandyn Almer)	3:25
47.	"Studio Bullshit" (hidden track)	3:37
Total length:		60:49

Notes

- The CD release shows 47 tracks; tracks 19-46 are blank, and track 47 is a hidden track of outtakes.
- "Take the Long Way Home" and "Right Turn Clyde" do not appear on the European or Australian releases of the album.

== Personnel ==
Band members

- Jimmy Pop – Lead Vocals, Guitar, Keyboards, Sampling, Production
- Lüpüs Thünder – Guitar, Programming
- Spanky G – Drums
- Evil Jared – Bass
- DJ Q-Ball – Vocals, co-lead vocals (track 5), turntables, Keyboards, Programming

Other personnel

- Rich Gavalis – engineer, editing, mixing, assist producer
- Derron Nuhfer – saxophone on Track 12
- Tavis Werts – trumpet on Track 12
- Rich Balling – trombone on Track 12
- Darrin "Dangerous" Pfeiffer – Drums (Track 6)
- Parry Gripp – Vocals (Track 1)
- Chasey Lain – Vocals

Production

- Avery Lipman – executive producer
- Monte Lipman – executive producer
- Joseph M. Palmaccio – mastering

== Charts ==
=== Weekly charts ===
Chart (1999–2000)	Peak position
Australian Albums (ARIA)	38
Austrian Albums (Ö3 Austria)	1
Belgian Albums (Ultratop Flanders)	22
Canadian Albums (Billboard)	6
Dutch Albums (Album Top 100)	58
European Albums (Music & Media)	5
Finnish Albums (Suomen virallinen lista)	3
German Albums (Offizielle Top 100)	1
Hungarian Albums (MAHASZ)	26
Irish Albums (IRMA)	57
New Zealand Albums (RMNZ)	5
Norwegian Albums (VG-lista)	16
Scottish Albums (Official Charts)	33
Swedish Albums (Sverigetopplistan)	19
Swiss Albums (Schweizer Hitparade)	2
UK Albums (Official Charts)	37
US Billboard 200	14

=== Year-end charts ===
Chart (1999)	Position
Austrian Albums (Ö3 Austria)	16
German Albums (Offizielle Top 100)	13

Chart (2000)	Position
Austrian Albums (Ö3 Austria)	27
Belgian Albums (Ultratop Flanders)	58
Canadian Albums (Nielsen SoundScan)	53
German Albums (Offizielle Top 100)	24
Swiss Albums (Schweizer Hitparade)	72
US Billboard 200	74

== Certifications ==
Region	Certification	Certified units/sales
Australia (ARIA)	Gold	35,000^{^}
Austria (IFPI Austria)	Platinum	50,000^{*}
Canada (Music Canada)	Platinum	100,000^{^}
Finland (Musiikkituottajat)	Gold	21,153
Germany (BVMI)	5× Gold	750,000^{‡}
New Zealand (RMNZ)	Gold	7,500^{^}
Poland (ZPAV)	Gold	50,000^{*}
Sweden (GLF)	Gold	40,000^{^}
Switzerland (IFPI Switzerland)	Platinum	50,000^{^}
United Kingdom (BPI)	Gold	100,000^{*}
United States (RIAA)	Platinum	1,000,000^{^}
Summaries
Europe (IFPI)	Platinum	1,000,000^{*}
^{*} Sales figures based on certification alone.^{^} Shipments figures based on certification alone.^{‡} Sales+streaming figures based on certification alone.
