= Why's Everybody Always Pickin' on Me? =

Single by Bloodhound Gang

from the album One Fierce Beer Coaster
- Released: December 7, 1997
- Recorded: 1996
- Length: 3:22
- Label: Jimmy Franks; Republic; Geffen
- Songwriter: Jimmy Pop
- Producer: Jimmy Pop

Bloodhound Gang singles chronology
"I Wish I Was Queer So I Could Get Chicks" (1997)	"Why's Everybody Always Pickin' on Me?" (1997)	"Along Comes Mary" (1999)

Music video
- "Why's Everybody Always Pickin' On Me?" on YouTube

"Why's Everybody Always Pickin' on Me?" is the third single off the Bloodhound Gang's second album One Fierce Beer Coaster. The song interpolates "Spooky" by Classics IV and samples "Never Let Me Down Again" by Depeche Mode. It also samples "Stormy" by Gabor Szabo. The title is borrowed from the classic 1959 song "Charlie Brown" performed by The Coasters, in which a school troublemaker complains about being picked upon when his schemes backfire.

== Music video ==
The music video starts out with Jimmy Pop in a psychiatrist's office. The doctor (whose name is Scott P. Nussenvy, a tongue-in-cheek reference to penis envy) proceeds to take Jimmy over to the couch and hypnotize him, in which Jimmy goes back over his horrible experience in high school and we see why he is the paranoid gelotophobic he is today.

There are many tongue-in-cheek references to sex and drug use over the course of the video (they attend Wannagett High School, the homecoming queen is named Ivana Getchuharde, and the school's team is the Wannagett Beavers).

The video shows Jimmy Pop's desperate attempts at trying to gain a little popularity, that fail miserably. He spends the whole of the video being picked on mainly by the other members of the band, until the bridge of the song where it is assumed that Jimmy has caused some sort of harm to, or possibly even killed the people who picked on him.

After the bridge, we see the other four members of the band come into the psychiatrist's office, put Jimmy Pop in a straitjacket, put him in a wheelchair and throw him down the stairs. Jimmy has the last laugh: as the video freeze-frames the screen reads, "Jimmy's former classmates all suffered from hemorrhoids. Luckily for them, Jimmy went on to become a successful proctologist."

The video then fades to black, showing an "all persons fictitious" disclaimer ending with "...except the drummer from Def Leppard", who is referenced in the bridge.

== Charts ==
=== Weekly charts ===
Weekly chart performance for "Why's Everybody Always Pickin' on Me?"
Chart (1997)	Peak position
Australia (ARIA)	64
Iceland (Íslenski Listinn Topp 40)	2
Netherlands (Single Top 100)	85
New Zealand (Recorded Music NZ)	7
UK Singles (Official Charts)	56

=== Year-end charts ===
Year-end chart performance for "Why's Everybody Always Pickin' on Me?"
Chart (1997)	Position
Iceland (Íslenski Listinn Topp 40)	47
