= Avery Lipman =

American music industry executive

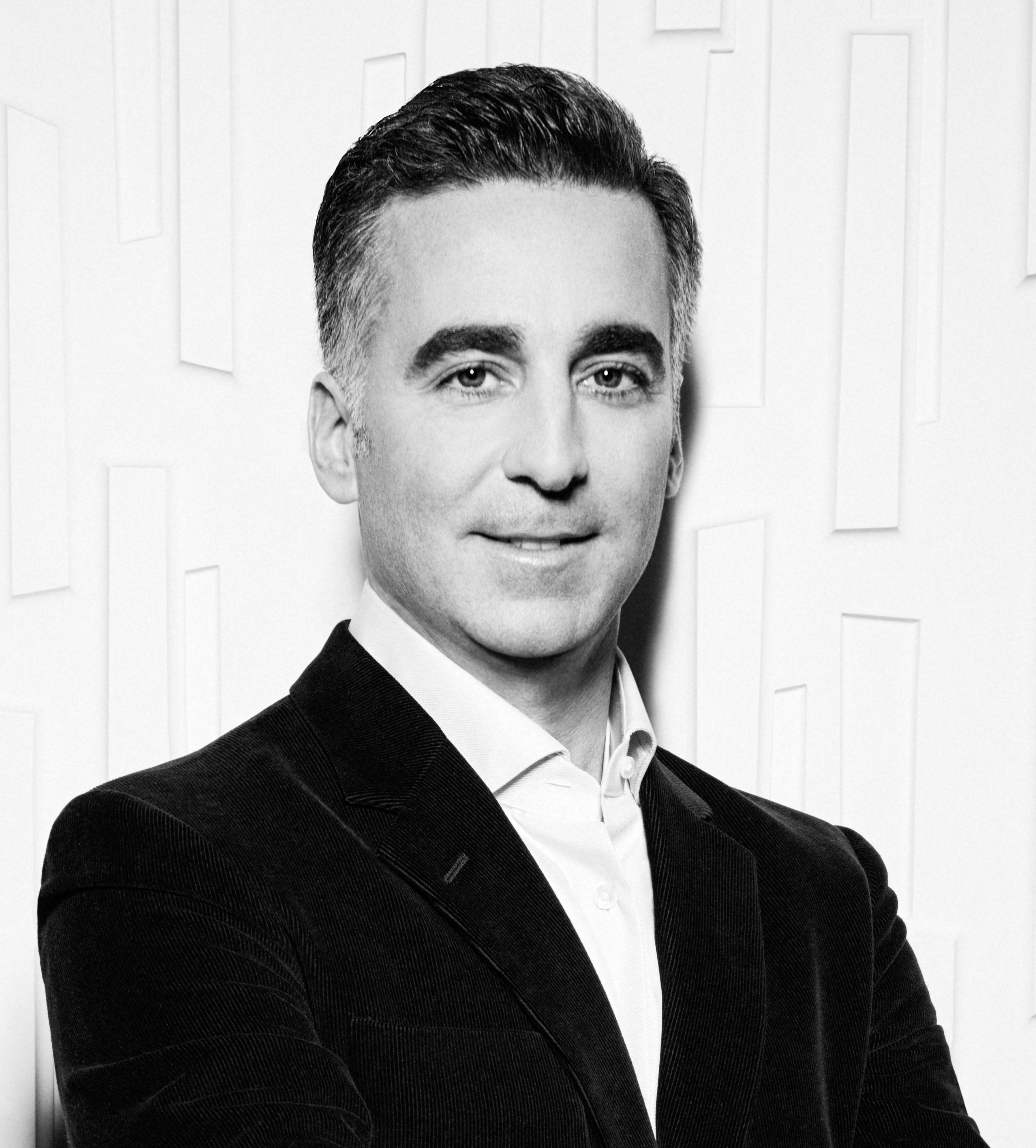
- Lipman in 2017
- Education: University at Albany
- Occupation: Music industry executive
- Years active: 1986–present
- Employer: Universal Music Group
- Known for: Co-Founder of Republic Records
- Title: President and COO
- Relatives: Monte Lipman

Avery Lipman is an American music industry executive. He is the co-founder and current President and COO of Republic Records. Over the course of his career, he had been involved with numerous acts including 3 Doors Down, Ariana Grande, BENEE, Godsmack, Jack Johnson, Julia Michaels, The Naked and Famous, Blue October, Post Malone, Phantogram and numerous others. He is the brother of fellow Republic co-founder and executive, Monte Lipman.

== Early life and education ==
Avery Lipman grew up partially in Montclair, New Jersey. He is of Jewish heritage. During their youth, the Lipman family encountered significant financial difficulties, which led them to rely on government assistance and food stamps. He attended Montclair High School where he played on the school's football and baseball teams and graduated in 1984. He then attended the University at Albany where he graduated with a bachelor's degree in English in 1988.

== Career ==
One of Lipman's first jobs after college was as Clive Davis' assistant at Arista Records. He parlayed that into a job at Sony Music International as the director of business administration in 1991. In 1995, he and his older brother, Monte Lipman, founded the independent label, Republic Records. The first act signed by the Lipmans was Bloodhound Gang whose record "Fire Water Burn" was picked up by the Los Angeles radio station, KROQ.

The brothers followed that by signing Chumbawamba to Republic after listening to the band's album Tubthumper just one time. That album sold over 10 million copies worldwide. It was also the first Republic album to be distributed by Universal Records after the Lipmans signed a joint venture to make Republic an imprint of Universal. Both the Lipmans have been associated with Universal Music in one way or another since that point. Other acts Lipman helped sign in Republic's early years included 3 Doors Down, Godsmack, Blue October, and numerous others.

In January 2000, Universal Music Group outright acquired Republic Records. As a result, Lipman was named the senior vice president of Republic after having been the label's general manager for several years. In January 2001, he was named the President of Republic Records. In 2006, corporate restructuring saw Universal Records merge with Republic, creating Universal Republic Records. Lipman became a senior vice president of the new combined label. In January 2008, Lipman was named co-president and COO of Universal Republic with his brother Monte (who also held the title of CEO). At the time, the label's acts included Amy Winehouse, Jack Johnson, Blue October, Colbie Caillat, Hinder, Damian Marley, India Arie, and others.

In the ensuing years, Lipman helped foster joint ventures with Big Machine Records and Cash Money Records (among others) to bring artists like Taylor Swift, The Band Perry, Lil Wayne, Drake, and Nicki Minaj under the Republic fold. In February 2013, Universal Music Group signed both Avery and Monte Lipman to long-term contracts, giving Avery the title of sole president and COO of Republic. By that point, the label's roster had expanded to include The Weeknd, Gotye, and PSY, among others. The label officially returned to its original Republic moniker around that time. Ariana Grande was signed to the label later that year.

The success of releases from Ariana Grande, Taylor Swift, Florence + the Machine, and others led to Republic being the number one label in market share in 2014. The following year, it was Billboard's "Top Label", "Top Hot 100 Label", and "Top R&B/Hip-Hop Label", among other plaudits. In 2017, Republic had two of Billboard's top 10 most-streamed songs in "Despacito" by Luis Fonsi and Daddy Yankee and "Congratulations" by Post Malone. In November 2018, Lipman helped officially bring Taylor Swift to Republic. Swift had previously released music through a partnership with Republic and Big Machine Records.

== Philanthropy ==
Lipman is involved in numerous philanthropic endeavors. He sits on the board of the T.J. Martell Foundation, which honored him and his brother with the Humanitarian of the Year Award in 2010. He and his brother were collectively honored as the "Music Visionaries of the Year" by the UJA-Federation of New York for their contributions to the organization. In 2017, Lipman was given the Multiple Myeloma Research Foundation's "Spirit of Hope Award" for his contributions to that organization. Lipman has also noted that he is involved with the organization, Hope for Heroism, which assists Israeli soldiers who were wounded in combat.
