= MMRC =

MMRC may refer to:

- Multiple Myeloma Research Consortium
- MacLehose Medical Rehabilitation Centre, a rehabilitation hospital in Sandy Bay, Hong Kong
