= Mope =

Single by Bloodhound Gang

from the album Hooray for Boobies
- Released: September 5, 2000
- Recorded: 1999
- Genre: Rap rock; comedy hip-hop
- Length: 4:36
- Label: Jimmy Franks; Geffen
- Songwriters: James Franks; Johann Hölzel; Rob Bolland; Ferdi Bolland; Peter Gill; Holly Johnson; Brian Nash; Mark O'Toole; James Hetfield; Lars Ulrich; Cliff Burton; Shigeichi Ishimura; Toshio Kai; David X. Cohen

Bloodhound Gang singles chronology
"The Ballad of Chasey Lain" (2000)	"Mope" (2000)	"The Inevitable Return of the Great White Dope" (2000)

Music video
- "Mope" on YouTube

"Mope" is a song by American comedy rock band the Bloodhound Gang, released in September 2000 as the fourth single from their third studio album Hooray for Boobies. The song contains numerous samples such as "Rock Me Amadeus" by Falco, "Relax" by Frankie Goes to Hollywood, "For Whom the Bell Tolls" by Metallica, the Pac-Man theme song, and Homer Simpson shouting "holy macaroni" from the "Treehouse of Horror VI" episode of The Simpsons. A music video for the single was released in June 2000.

== Single track listing ==
1. "Mope" (The Bloodhound Gang Mix)
2. "Mope" (The Pet Shop Boys 7" Remix)
3. "Mope" (The Swamp Remix)
4. "Fire Water Burn" (The Bloodhound Gang Remix)

The single also includes the "Cousin Mike" version of the music video for "The Ballad of Chasey Lain", and has track 6 listed as "Tic Tac Toe – Remus Pops Jefferson Game" which is a tic-tac-toe board design on the CD itself, with the center hole representing the first move. In the liner notes, the listener is encouraged to post the CD to Remus Pops Jefferson if they have no-one to play with, and a postal address is included.

== Charts ==
Chart (2000)	Peak position
Belgium (Ultratop 50 Flanders)	49
Germany (GfK)	34
Sweden (Sverigetopplistan)	56
Switzerland (Schweizer Hitparade)	77
