= I Wish I Was Queer So I Could Get Chicks =

1997 single by Bloodhound Gang

Single by Bloodhound Gang

from the album One Fierce Beer Coaster
- Released: 1997
- Length: 3:49
- Label: Jimmy Franks; Republic; Geffen
- Songwriter(s): Jimmy Pop
- Producer(s): Jimmy Pop

Bloodhound Gang singles chronology
"Fire Water Burn" (1997)	"I Wish I Was Queer So I Could Get Chicks" (1997)	"Why's Everybody Always Pickin' on Me?" (1997)

"I Wish I Was Queer So I Could Get Chicks" is the second single from American rap rock band Bloodhound Gang's second studio album, One Fierce Beer Coaster (1996). Released as a single in 1997, the song charted in New Zealand, reaching number 32 that October. An alternate version was recorded as a B-side, featuring a crooning vocal over Nashville country/lounge backing.

== Content ==
The satirical song is entirely about the belief that girls only like gay men. The lyrics reference the stereotype that gay men are often better looking and more sensitive than heterosexual men, enjoy the band Depeche Mode and avant garde ballet, and how Jimmy Pop, the band's singer, wishes that he could be a homosexual to be more successful with women.

== Reception ==
Writing in the LGBT magazine The Advocate, Barry Walters described the song as "annoying" but admitted the band's stereotypes of homosexuals were somewhat accurate, "especially the Depeche Mode part". Passing mention in The Rolling Stone Album Guide cited the song as an example of the band's "easy to offend" lyrics, while The Encyclopedia of Popular Music described it as an example of the band's "school boy level of humour".

== Music video ==
The music video starts out with Jimmy Pop, who is playing a gay talk-show host named Dirk Ramrod, and his co-host, Lewis, who is played by bassist Evil Jared Hasselhoff discussing their special guest for the day, Lupus Thunder and DJ Q-Ball from Bloodhound Gang. The video then becomes a montage of some of Dirk and Lewis's (Jimmy and Jared's) favorite (nastiest) moments off the show, leaving DJ Q-Ball and Lupus disgusted and slightly amused until the video ends with Jimmy Pop and Evil Jared saying, "Come again, if ya got the balls!"

== Charts ==
Weekly chart performance for "I Wish I Was Queer So I Could Get Chicks"
Chart (1997)	Peak position
New Zealand (Recorded Music NZ)	32
