= The Bad Touch =

1999 single by Bloodhound Gang

- The explicit cover of "The Bad Touch"

Single by Bloodhound Gang

from the album Hooray for Boobies
- B-side: "Along Comes Mary"
- Released: September 3, 1999
- Genre: Euro disco; dance-pop; synth-pop; rap rock
- Length: 4:20
- Label: Jimmy Franks; Geffen
- Songwriter: Jimmy Pop
- Producer: Jimmy Pop

Bloodhound Gang singles chronology
"Along Comes Mary" (1999)	"The Bad Touch" (1999)	"The Ballad of Chasey Lain" (2000)

Music video
- "The Bad Touch" on YouTube

Audio sample
- file; help

"The Bad Touch" is a song by American alternative rock band Bloodhound Gang. It was released in September 1999 as the second single from their third studio album, Hooray for Boobies, which was released the following year in the United States and United Kingdom. In most territories, the song was released as the first single from the album, as "Along Comes Mary" was issued only in German-speaking Europe.

"The Bad Touch" became a hit in Europe throughout late 1999 and early 2000, reaching number one in Flanders, Germany, Ireland, Italy, Norway, Scotland, Spain, and Sweden. Outside Europe, the song peaked at number five in Australia, number four in New Zealand, number nine in Canada, and number 52 in the United States. In Ireland, the song won a Meteor Music Award for Best Selling International Single – Group. The song was remixed by many artists, including God Lives Underwater, KMFDM, and Eiffel 65.

== Music video ==
The song's video features the band dressed in "MonkeyRat" costumes with oversized ears, in numerous locations in Paris, including the Place de l'Estrapade, Avenue de Saxe, and Champ de Mars; the Eiffel Tower is visible in many shots. During the video, the band uses blowguns to shoot tranquilizer darts into the buttocks of four passing young women, then carry them away. They then use a fishing rod to dangle a croissant in front of a group of chefs, enticing them to follow. The band members dance around for a few seconds and then lure three chefs into following them. The band members swallow several mealworms before finding two effeminate gay men in a café, who are then beaten over the head with baguettes and knocked unconscious. A mime artist played by actor Jordan Prentice is captured in a net then thrown into a cage with the four women, three chefs and gay couple in a parody of animal-collectors capturing frightened specimens. The band leap around the cage, taunting their captives. As the song draws to an end, the prisoners are released and all dance together in formation in the street. The mime artist escapes and is run over by a speeding Renault 5 car driven by Lüpüs Thünder.

The uncensored version of the video shows the band playing with and eating a brown semi-liquid food, with the implication it is diarrhea, and a beginning which features them feigning sex in a doggy-style position rather than dancing as in the clean version. The violent capture of the gay couple is also missing from some versions.

=== Controversy ===
A scene in the video featuring a pair of gay men, who share french fries and are subsequently beaten by the band members with baguettes, was cut after it premiered. GLAAD complained about the scene to MTV stating "a gay-bashing scene in any context in today's climate is not acceptable". MTV reviewed the video and suggested to Geffen Records that the scene be cut; Geffen complied and released an edited version of the video. Lead singer Jimmy Pop commented: "I would give any gay man two tickets to the Andrew Lloyd Webber musical of his choice if he could describe exactly who's going to become violent based on that scene."

== Track listings ==
US 12-inch single

A1. "The Bad Touch" (The Bloodhound Gang mix)
A2. "The Bad Touch" (The Eiffel 65 mix)
A3. "The Bad Touch" (The God Lives Underwater mix)
B1. "The Bad Touch" (The Rollergirl mix)
B2. "The Bad Touch" (The K.M.F.D.M. mix)
B3. "The Bad Touch" (The Bully mix)

European CD single

1. "The Bad Touch" (LP version) – 4:23
2. "Along Comes Mary" (The Bloodhound Gang mix) – 3:20

European 12-inch single

A1. "The Bad Touch" (Eiffel 65 extended mix) – 4:28
A2. "The Bad Touch" (12-inch Rollerbabe mix) – 5:59
B1. "The Bad Touch" (album version) – 4:19
B2. "The Bad Touch" (12-inch instrumental Rollerboogie mix) – 5:55

European and Australian maxi-CD single

1. "The Bad Touch" (LP version) – 4:23
2. "The Bad Touch" (The God Lives Underwater mix) – 4:26
3. "The Bad Touch" (The K.M.F.D.M. mix) – 4:19
4. "Along Comes Mary" (The Bloodhound Gang mix) – 3:19
5. "Kiss Me Where It Smells Funny" (video) – 3:27

== Charts ==
=== Weekly charts ===
Chart (1999–2000)	Peak position
Australia (ARIA)	5
Austria (Ö3 Austria Top 40)	3
Belgium (Ultratop 50 Flanders)	1
Belgium (Ultratip Bubbling Under Wallonia)	10
Canada Top Singles (RPM)	9
Canada Dance/Urban (RPM)	6
Czech Republic (IFPI)	16
Denmark (IFPI)	2
Estonia (Eesti Top 20)	1
Europe (Eurochart Hot 100)	7
European Radio Top 50 (Music & Media)	30
Finland (Suomen virallinen lista)	8
France (SNEP)	21
Germany (GfK)	1
Iceland (Íslenski Listinn Topp 40)	4
Ireland (IRMA)	1
Italy (FIMI)	1
Italy Airplay (Music & Media)	7
Latvia (Latvian Airplay Top 20)	1
Netherlands (Dutch Top 40)	17
Netherlands (Single Top 100)	19
New Zealand (Recorded Music NZ)	4
Norway (VG-lista)	1
Poland Airplay (Music & Media)	6
Quebec (ADISQ)	2
Scottish Singles Sales (Official Charts)	1
Scandinavia (Music & Media)	10
Spain (Promusicae)	1
Sweden (Sverigetopplistan)	1
Switzerland (Schweizer Hitparade)	4
UK Singles (Official Charts)	4
US Billboard Hot 100	52
US Alternative Airplay (Billboard)	6
US Dance Club Songs (Billboard)	1
US Pop Airplay (Billboard)	21
US Rhythmic Airplay (Billboard)	29

Chart (2020)	Peak position
Hungary (Single Top 40)	40

=== Year-end charts ===
Chart (1999)	Position
Australia (ARIA)	99
Austria (Ö3 Austria Top 40)	16
Europe (Eurochart Hot 100)	30
Germany (Media Control)	13
Netherlands (Dutch Top 40)	117
New Zealand (RIANZ)	9
Sweden (Hitlistan)	7
Switzerland (Schweizer Hitparade)	31

Chart (2000)	Position
Australia (ARIA)	87
Belgium (Ultratop 50 Flanders)	14
Europe (Eurochart Hot 100)	34
Iceland (Íslenski Listinn Topp 40)	91
Ireland (IRMA)	5
Spain (AFYVE)	14
Switzerland (Schweizer Hitparade)	83
UK Singles (OCC)	20
US Mainstream Top 40 (Billboard)	95
US Modern Rock Tracks (Billboard)	46

=== Decade-end charts ===
Chart (1990–1999)	Rank
Austria (Ö3 Austria Top 40)	46

== Certifications ==
Region	Certification	Certified units/sales
Australia (ARIA)	Platinum	70,000^{^}
Austria (IFPI Austria)	Gold	25,000^{*}
Belgium (BRMA)	Gold	25,000^{*}
Denmark (IFPI Danmark)	Gold	45,000^{‡}
Germany (BVMI)	3× Gold	900,000^{‡}
New Zealand (RMNZ)	Gold	5,000^{*}
Sweden (GLF)	2× Platinum	60,000^{^}
Switzerland (IFPI Switzerland)	Gold	25,000^{^}
United Kingdom (BPI)	Platinum	600,000^{‡}
^{*} Sales figures based on certification alone.^{^} Shipments figures based on certification alone.^{‡} Sales+streaming figures based on certification alone.

== Release history ==
Region	Date	Format(s)	Label(s)	Ref.
Europe	September 3, 1999	CD	Geffen	
United States	February 1, 2000	Alternative radio	Geffen	
United Kingdom	April 3, 2000	CD; cassette	Geffen	
