= The Ballad of Chasey Lain =

2000 single by Bloodhound Gang

Single by Bloodhound Gang

from the album Hooray for Boobies
- Released: February 14, 2000
- Length: 2:21
- Label: Jimmy Franks; Geffen
- Songwriter: Jimmy Pop
- Producer: Jimmy Pop

Bloodhound Gang singles chronology
"The Bad Touch" (1999)	"The Ballad of Chasey Lain" (2000)	"Mope" (2000)

Music video
- "The Ballad of Chasey Lain" on YouTube

"The Ballad of Chasey Lain" is a song by American comedy rock band the Bloodhound Gang. It was released in February 2000 as the third single from their third studio album, Hooray for Boobies (1999). The song reached number one in Iceland and became a top-20 hit in Austria, Finland, Germany, Spain, and the United Kingdom.

== Content ==
According to a band interview to the BBC, the song was written after lead singer Jimmy Pop had seen pornographic film actress Chasey Lain in a clothing ad. When questioned if the infatuation was real, he commented "No. No. What happened was, I saw her in a clothing ad, and I was like, 'she's really cute'. So I'm not sure if we started 'researching' Chasey Lain but she came out and performed on our record with us, and her arms were like, hairier than mine. And she was dumber than that table".

In 2023, Jimmy Pop tweeted that he regretted that he had "talked shit on" Lain, had been "butthurt" that she hadn't shown up on the day the song's video was shot, and that "her arms weren't hairy and she didn't come off as dumb, just bubbly."

== Music video ==
The music video features the band performing the song on stage, and the director and the film crew are all naked women. Throughout the course of the video, the band members are apparently becoming distracted by the naked women; Jared Hasselhoff even falls off the stage at one point. At the end of the video, Jimmy Pop complains about being distracted and the camera pans to an obese man eating food in a sloppy and disgusting manner, implying that the members had been distracted by him, rather than the women.

== Charts ==
=== Weekly charts ===
Chart (2000)	Peak position
Australia (ARIA)	68
Austria (Ö3 Austria Top 40)	11
Belgium (Ultratip Bubbling Under Flanders)	3
Europe (Eurochart Hot 100)	44
Finland (Suomen virallinen lista)	15
Germany (GfK)	12
Iceland (Íslenski Listinn Topp 40)	1
Ireland (IRMA)	29
Netherlands (Single Top 100)	71
Scottish Singles Sales (Official Charts)	10
Spain (Promusicae)	16
Sweden (Sverigetopplistan)	35
Switzerland (Schweizer Hitparade)	23
UK Singles (Official Charts)	15

=== Year-end charts ===
Chart (2000)	Position
Iceland (Íslenski Listinn Topp 40)	7

== Release history ==
Region	Date	Format(s)	Label(s)	Ref.
Europe	February 14, 2000	CD	Jimmy Franks; Geffen	
United Kingdom	August 21, 2000	CD; cassette	Jimmy Franks; Geffen	
