= Multiple Myeloma Research Consortium =

- Abbreviation: MMRC
- Founder: Kathy Giusti
- Type: Medical research consortium
- Headquarters: Norwalk, Connecticut, United States
- Parent organization: Multiple Myeloma Research Foundation

The mission of the Multiple Myeloma Research Consortium (MMRC) is to champion collaboration with and integration across academia and industry and to focus on speed and innovation to bring the most promising multiple myeloma treatments to patients faster. It was founded by Kathy Giusti, a myeloma patient and founder and chief executive officer of the Multiple Myeloma Research Foundation (MMRF).

== MMRC model ==
The MMRC comprises 14 member institutions nationwide that form its clinical trials network. It is led by an executive committee in Norwalk, Connecticut, and a steering committee and progress review committee composed of researchers from MMRC Member Institutions. The MMRC also includes a shared tissue bank of annotated tissue and peripheral blood samples from multiple myeloma patients.

== MMRC member institutions ==
The MMRC currently comprises fourteen world-renowned academic institutions:

- Dana–Farber Cancer Institute
- H. Lee Moffitt Cancer Center & Research Institute
- Mayo Clinic
- City of Hope National Medical Center
- Emory University, Indiana University
- Hackensack University Medical Center
- Ohio State University Comprehensive Cancer Center
- Saint Vincent Catholic Medical Center
- University Health Network (Princess Margaret Cancer Centre)
- University of California, San Francisco Medical Center
- University of Chicago
- University of Michigan Rogel Cancer Center
- Alvin J. Siteman Cancer Center at Barnes-Jewish Hospital
- Washington University School of Medicine.

== MMRC Tissue Bank ==
The MMRC Tissue Bank serves as a “bridge” between laboratory and clinical research conducted by the MMRC and is a resource to advance the MMRC Multiple Myeloma Genomics Initiative.

== MMRC clinical trials ==
The MMRC is focused on advancing Phase I and Phase II clinical trials of novel compounds and combination approaches. To date, the MMRC has opened through its clinical trials network 22 clinical trials with industry partners – including Novartis, Celgene, Merck, and Proteolix. MMRC clinical trials are also designed to include correlative studies to better understand what drugs are most effective in treating various sub-groups of patients with myeloma, laying the foundation for the development of personalized medicine.

== MMRC Multiple Myeloma Genomics Initiative ==
The MMRC Multiple Myeloma Genomics Initiative comprehensive genomic analysis program. It was designed to rapidly accelerate progress made against multiple myeloma by significantly improving the understanding of the biology of the disease. It is spearheaded by the MMRC and in collaboration with the Broad Institute and the Translational Genomics Research Institute (TGen).

== See also ==
- Multiple Myeloma Research Foundation
- Multiple Myeloma Research Consortium (MMRC) and Synta Pharmaceuticals Announce Initiation of Ganetespib Clinical Trial in Multiple Myeloma
- The Multiple Myeloma Research Consortium (MMRC) Model: Reduced Time to Trial Activation and Improved Accrual Metrics.
