= Chutzpah =

Presumptuous audacity

Chutzpah (/ˈxʊtspə, ˈhʊt-/; Yiddish: חוצפּה, romanized: khutspe) is the quality of audacity, for good or for bad. The word derives from the Hebrew ḥuṣpā (חֻצְפָּה), meaning "insolence", "cheek" or "audacity". Thus, the original Yiddish word has a strongly negative connotation, but the form which entered English as a Yiddishism in American English has taken on a broader meaning, having been popularized through vernacular use in film, literature, and television. In American English the word is sometimes interpreted—particularly in business parlance—as meaning the amount of courage, mettle or ardor that an individual has.

== Etymology ==
The term entered the English language some time between 1890–95 from Yiddish חוצפּה (ḥuṣpâ). It was used in Mishnaic Hebrew, חוֹצְפָּה (ḥôṣǝpâ), from חָצַף (ḥāṣap, “to be insolent”), though it is believed to come initially from Aramaic, חֲצִיפָא (ḥăṣîpāʾ), חֲצַף (ḥaṣap, “to be barefaced, insolent”).

In Hebrew, chutzpah is used indignantly, to describe someone who has overstepped the boundaries of accepted behavior. In traditional usage, the word expresses a strong sense of disapproval, condemnation and outrage.

Leo Rosten in The Joys of Yiddish defines chutzpah as "gall, brazen nerve, effrontery, incredible 'guts', presumption plus arrogance such as no other word and no other language can do justice to". In this sense, chutzpah expresses both strong disapproval and condemnation. In the same work, Rosten also defines the term as "that quality enshrined in a man who, having killed his mother and father, throws himself on the mercy of the court because he is an orphan".

Chutzpah amounts to a total denial of personal responsibility, which renders others speechless and incredulous.

The cognate of ḥuṣpāh in Classical Arabic, ḥaṣāfah (حصافة), does not mean "impudence" or "cheekiness" or anything similar, but rather "sound judgment".

== Rabbinical literature ==
Rabbi Harold M. Schulweis distinguishes the meaning of chutzpah as stubbornness and contrariness from what he calls a tradition of "spiritual audacity" or "chutzpah klapei shmaya":

We are conventionally raised to believe that Jewish faith demands unwavering obedience to the law and the *law-giver. That attitude tends to cultivate a temperament of compliance and passivity. For conventional thinking, "talking back to God" smacks of heresy. But a significant genre of religious, moral and spiritual audacity toward the divine authority—"chutzpah klapei shmaya"—finds a place of honor in Jewish religious thought.

As an example, Schulweis cites a case where Moses argues with God about the justice of His commands:

For Moses, that God should "visit the iniquity of the fathers upon the children to the third and fourth generation" (Exod. 20:5) is an unacceptable form of group punishment akin to the morally indiscriminate punishment of Sodom. Challenging God's pronouncement of the punishment of the sons for the sins of the fathers, Moses argues with God, against God, and in the name of God. Moses engages God with fierce moral logic:

Sovereign of the Universe, consider the righteousness of Abraham and the idol worship of his father Terach. Does it make moral sense to punish the child for the transgressions of the father? Sovereign of the Universe, consider the righteous deeds of King Hezekiah, who sprang from the loins of his evil father King Achaz. Does Hezekiah deserve Achaz's punishment? Consider the nobility of King Josiah, whose father Amnon was wicked. Should Josiah inherit the punishment of Amnon? (Num. Rabbah, Hukkat XIX, 33)

Trained to view God as an unyielding authoritarian proclaiming immutable commands, we might expect that Moses will be severely chastised for his defiance. Who is this finite, errant, fallible, human creature to question the explicit command of the author of the Ten Commandments? The divine response to Moses, according to the rabbinic moral imagination, is arresting:

By your life Moses, you have instructed Me. Therefore I will nullify My words and confirm yours. Thus it is said, "The fathers shall not be put to death for the children, neither shall the children be put to death for the fathers." (Deut. 24:16)

== Israeli Hebrew usage ==
In Modern Hebrew, Chutzpah (חוצפה) is commonly used to express indignation at perceived disrespect, insolence, or violation of social norms. The term often conveys moral outrage, as in the exclamation “!איזו חוצפה” (“What nerve!”), directed at behavior considered inappropriate or offensive. At the same time, in colloquial Israeli speech the word may carry a more nuanced or ambivalent tone. It can be used humorously among friends or to express reluctant admiration for bold or unconventional behavior, particularly when such behavior challenges rigid authority or social hierarchy. This dual usage reflects broader features of Israeli communication style, which scholars have characterized as direct and informal.

The coexistence of disapproval and admiration in Israeli Hebrew parallels similar semantic developments in English, though the negative sense remains more dominant in formal contexts and public discourse.

== English usage ==
In English, particularly in the United States, chutzpah has developed a broader range of meanings than in its original Yiddish and Hebrew contexts. While it can still denote shameless audacity or brazen impudence, the term is frequently used in a more ambivalent or even admiring sense to describe boldness, assertiveness, or unconventional self confidence. This semantic broadening is especially evident in business, entrepreneurship, and political discourse, where chutzpah may refer to a willingness to challenge authority, take risks, or pursue ambitious goals despite obstacles. In such contexts, the term can imply a form of socially disruptive confidence that is perceived as instrumental to innovation or success.

At the same time, the word retains its critical edge in many settings. It may be used to condemn perceived arrogance, entitlement, or disregard for social norms, particularly when bold behavior is viewed as unjustified. The coexistence of positive and negative meanings reflects a broader pattern in English whereby terms of reproach are reappropriated to express reluctant admiration for daring or boundary breaking conduct.

The adoption of chutzpah into American English is part of a wider incorporation of Yiddish loanwords into colloquial speech, especially in urban centers with large Jewish populations during the late nineteenth and early twentieth centuries. Over time, the term entered mainstream usage through literature, film, comedy, and journalism, contributing to its semantic flexibility and widespread recognition.

=== Yiddish legal opinion ===
Judge Alex Kozinski and Eugene Volokh in an article entitled Lawsuit Shmawsuit, note the rise in use of Yiddish words in legal opinion. They note that chutzpah has been used 231 times in American legal opinions, 220 of those after 1980. Chutzpah first appeared in a Supreme Court decision in 1998, in National Endowment for the Arts v. Finley, when Justice Antonin Scalia used it to describe the NEA's brazenness in asking for government funding.

== Other languages ==
The Polish word hucpa (pronounced [ˈxut͜spa]) is also derived from this term, although its meaning is closer to 'insolence' or 'arrogance', and so it is typically used in a more negative sense instead of denoting a positive description of someone's audacity.

Similarly, the German form of "chutzpah" is Chuzpe. In Czech, chucpe is commonly used with a sharply negative connotation. The Dutch noun gotspe is also related and refers to a brazen or shameless act or situation.

== In popular culture ==
In the Hindi-language film Haider (2014) by Vishal Bharadwaj, a modern-day interpretation of Hamlet set against the backdrop of Kashmir in the midst of political conflict, the protagonist uses the word, which he pronounces as /'tʃʊtspə/ instead of /ˈhʊtspə/ or /ˈxʊtspə/ to describe India's way of treating the people of Kashmir since the beginning of the conflict.

A Hindi-language streaming television series titled Chutzpah premiered on Sony Liv in 2021.

Jewish American Senator Ron Wyden wrote a book, It Takes Chutzpah, advocating for progressivism.

Jewish News described the character of Marty Mouser in Marty Supreme as embodying Jewish chutzpah, portraying him as an audacious hustler whose boldness reflects a determination to seize opportunities despite adversity.

== Modern usage and semantic shift ==
In contemporary usage, particularly in American English, chutzpah has undergone a notable semantic shift from its original negative connotation of insolence or impudence to a more ambivalent or even positive meaning. While the term traditionally expressed strong disapproval, it is now often used to describe boldness, assertiveness, or audacious self confidence, especially when such traits lead to success or innovation. In business, entrepreneurship, and popular self help discourse, chutzpah may be used approvingly to denote risk taking, initiative, and the willingness to challenge established norms. This shift reflects broader patterns in American vernacular speech, where terms of criticism are sometimes reappropriated to convey admiration for unconventional behavior.

Despite this change, the word retains its negative sense in many contexts. In Israeli Hebrew, for example, chutzpah is commonly used to express indignation at perceived disrespect or boundary crossing, though in informal speech it may also be used humorously or with reluctant admiration. The coexistence of positive and negative meanings illustrates the term’s flexibility across cultural and linguistic settings.

== See also ==
- List of English words of Yiddish origin
- Cojones
- Firgun
- Hubris
- Sisu
