= Gelotophilia =

Enjoyment of being laughed at

Gelotophilia is the joy of being laughed at. Gelotophiles are people who actively seek and establish situations in which others may laugh at them. They gain joy from these situations and do not feel embarrassed. Gelotophiles speak frankly about misfortunes and mishaps but also about situations in which they acted stupidly or produced something that was involuntarily funny. Typically, they would not mind if they were caught on camera while something funny (yet potentially embarrassing) happened to them and this was sent to a TV program that shows such clips or if it was uploaded to websites such as YouTube or the like.

== Empirical studies ==
The empirical study of gelotophilia started in 2009 when the first academic paper on this topic has been published. Along with gelotophobia and katagelasticism it can be measured through a questionnaire that consists of 45 questions (the PhoPhiKat-45; the PhoPhiKat-30 is a short form that consists of 30 items). This is a reliable and valid instrument that has been used in a variety of studies.

Gelotophobia, gelotophilia, and katagelasticism describe three different stances towards laughter and laughing at. Empirical studies with the PhoPhiKat-45 show that, of course, people can not at the same time fear and like being laughed at (i.e., be gelotophobes and gelotophiles at the same time). However, there is at least a subgroup of gelotophobes that enjoys laughing at others, despite knowing how harmful this can be. Finally, gelotophilia and katagelasticism are positively related; i.e., those who enjoy being laughed at might also enjoy laughing at others.
