= Firgun =

Delight or pride in the accomplishment of the other

Firgun (Hebrew: פירגון) is an informal modern Hebrew term and concept in Israeli culture, which compliments someone or describes genuine, unselfish delight or pride in the accomplishment of another person. Another definition describes firgun as a generosity of spirit, an unselfish, empathetic joy that something good has happened, or might happen, to another person. The concept does not have a one-word equivalent in English. The infinitive form of the word, lefargen, means to make someone feel good without any ulterior motives. This absence of negativity is an integral part of the concept of firgun.

== Etymology ==
The word can be traced back to the Yiddish word farginen (a cognate of the German word vergönnen). A relatively modern addition to Hebrew, the word was initially used in the 1970s, and gained momentum in subsequent decades. According to Tamar Katriel, professor emeritus of communications in the University of Haifa, firgun differs from giving compliments, since it is "about an affinity that is authentic and without agenda". The concept of firgun can be found in Talmudic Hebrew as ayin tova or ayin yafa - "a good eye". Those phrases are not commonly used in modern Hebrew.

== International Firgun Day ==
In 2014, Made in JLM, an Israeli non-profit community group, set out to create "International Firgun Day", a holiday celebrated yearly on July 17, where people share compliments or express genuine pride in the accomplishment of others on social media. To help promote the holiday, Made in JLM holds an overnight marketing hackathon at the night before July 17 and an online automatic firgun-generating tool in several languages, called the firgunator."

== See also ==
- Chutzpah
- Mudita, a Buddhist term for delighting vicariously in another's well-being
- Naches (Yiddish)
- Praise
- Schadenfreude (antonym)
