= Katagelasticism =

Human psychological condition

Katagelasticism is a psychological condition in which a person enjoys mocking others. Katagelasticists actively seek and establish situations in which they can laugh at others (at the expense of these people). There is a broad variety of things that katagelasticists would do—starting from harmless pranks or word plays to truly embarrassing and even harmful, mean-spirited jokes. They would be of the opinion that mocking others is part of the daily life and if others do not like being laughed at, they should just fight back. For katagelasticists, it is fun mocking others and there is almost nothing that might hinder them from doing so. For them, some people might even provoke getting mocked and deserve being mocked. This condition often makes it difficult for sufferers to gain and maintain acquaintances and romantic partners.

The term was coined by Christian F. Hempelmann and Sean Harrigan from katagelastēs (καταγελαστής), Ancient Greek for "mocker".

== Research ==
The first academic paper to investigate this phenomenon was published in 2009. Along with gelotophobia and gelotophilia, it can be measured through a questionnaire that consists of 45 questions (the PhoPhiKat-45; the PhoPhiKat-30 is a short form that consists of 30 items). This is a reliable and valid instrument that has been used in a variety of studies. The questionnaire is also online for a free self-assessment in German here.

Gelotophobia, gelotophilia, and katagelasticism describe three different stances towards laughter and laughing at. Empirical studies with the PhoPhiKat-45 show that people can not at the same time fear and like being laughed at (i.e., be gelotophobes and gelotophiles at the same time). However, there is at least a subgroup of gelotophobes that enjoys laughing at others, despite knowing how harmful this can be. Finally, gelotophilia and katagelasticism are positively related; that is, those who enjoy being laughed at might also enjoy laughing at others.

== See also ==
- Schadenfreude – pleasure derived from the misfortunes of others
- Oral-aggressive personality – a personality characterised by aggressiveness, exploitativeness, ambition, and envy.
