= Made in JLM =

MadeinJLM (Made in Jerusalem)
- Founded: 2012
- Region served: Jerusalem
- Key people: Hanan Brand (Founder and Chairman), Roy Munin (Founder and CEO), Uriel Shuraki (Founder and VP), Rachel Wagner Rosenzweig (COO), Yehuda Leibler (CTO)
- Website: madeinjlm.org

Made in JLM ("Made in Jerusalem") is a nonprofit organization that connects and provides resources for the tech and startup ecosystem in Jerusalem.

== History ==
Founded in 2012 by Hanan Brand, Roy Munin, and Uriel Shuraki, the NGO focuses on bringing together Jerusalem entrepreneurs, startups, R&D centers, academic institutions, service providers and investors, and to develop, support, and connect Jerusalem's innovation ecosystem. The organization maintains a forum of above a hundred of the city's tech community leaders from across sectors, and has more than 4000 active members.

As of 2016, Made in JLM has more than 500 Jerusalem startup companies in its database, of which 150 companies are in the biotech industry, 250 are in the Internet, mobile and software sectors, and around 100 in Cleantech, Energy, Semiconductor and Industrial technologies. Since 2014, more than 100 new startups were opened in the city every year. The organization supports a few professional sub-communities for developers, marketers, designers, game developers, cyber Security experts and more.

In 2014, Made in JLM set out to create "International Firgun Day", a holiday celebrated yearly on July 17, where people share compliments or express genuine pride in the accomplishment of others on social media. To help promote the holiday, Made in JLM holds an overnight marketing hackathon at the night before July 17 and an online automatic Firgun-generating tool in several languages, called the "Firgunator"

In April 2014, the organization launched a blog focusing on start up companies and innovation in Jerusalem.

In April 2015, the Time Magazine picked Jerusalem as one of the five emerging tech hubs in the world, mentioning Made in JLM resources and community as one of the factors transforming the city into a "flourishing center for biomed, cleantech, Internet/mobile startups, accelerators, investors and supporting service providers."

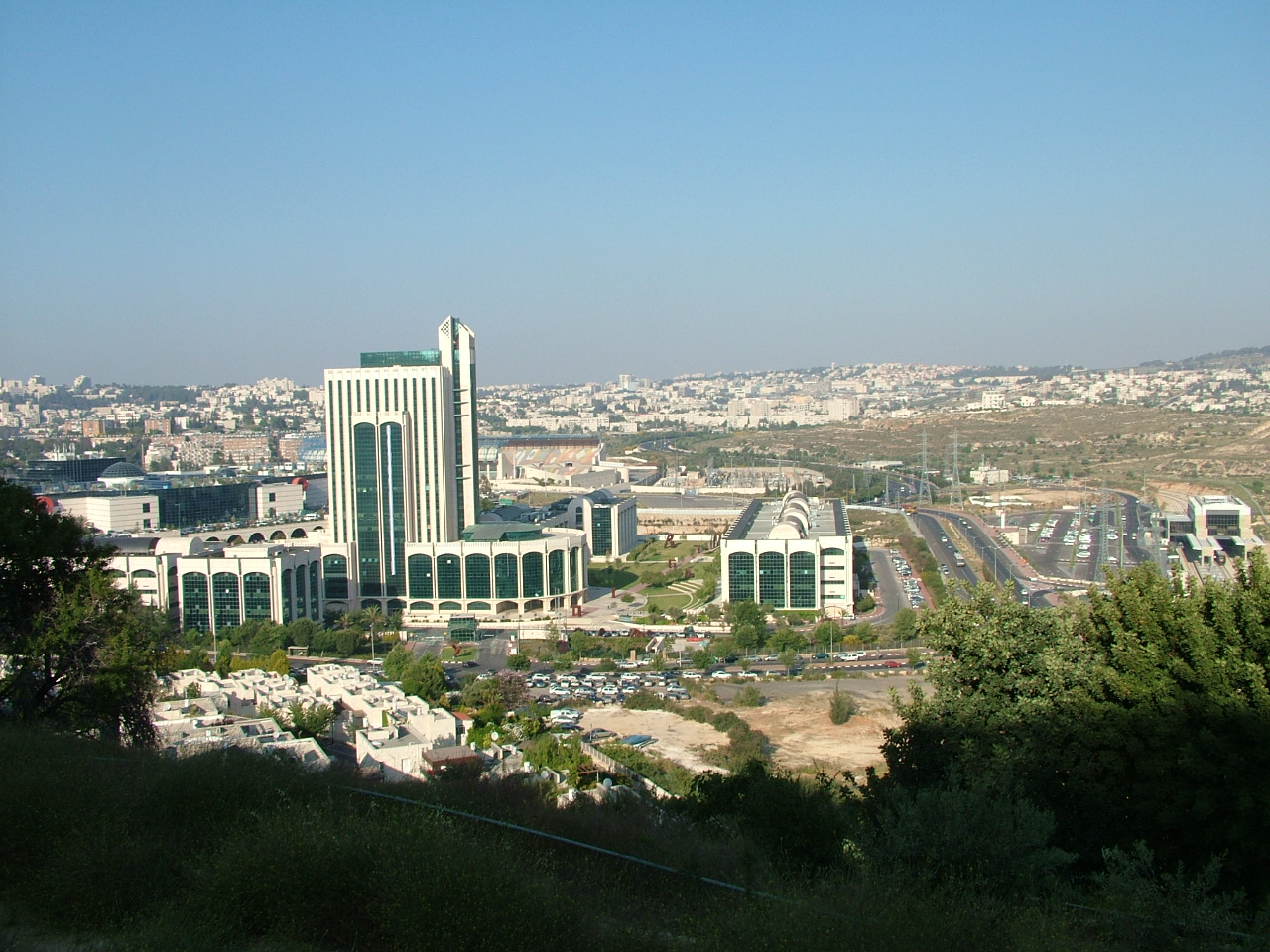
Jerusalem Technology Park

== See also ==
- Silicon Wadi
- Economy of Israel
- Science and technology in Israel
- Venture capital in Israel
