= Monte Lipman =

American music executive

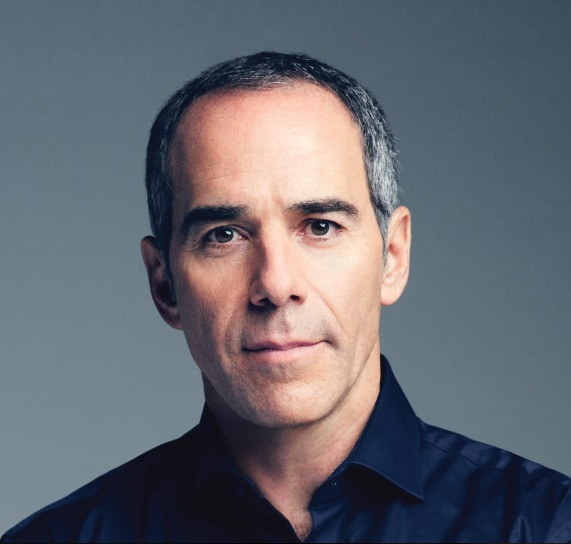
- Lipman in 2018
- Education: University at Albany
- Occupations: Record executive; film producer
- Years active: 1986–present
- Employer: Universal Music Group
- Title: Founder and CEO of Republic Records
- Spouse: Dr. Angelina Lipman
- Relatives: Avery Lipman (brother)

Monte Lipman is an American record executive and film producer. He founded the record label Republic Records in 1995, for which he is chief executive officer. He has worked with artists including James Blake, Drake, Florence + the Machine, Ariana Grande, Taylor Swift, Amy Winehouse, Post Malone, The Weeknd, BENEE, Pearl Jam, Jack Johnson, and John Mellencamp.

== Early life and education ==
Lipman grew up partially in Montclair, New Jersey and graduated from Montclair High School. He is of Jewish heritage. During their youth, the Lipman family encountered significant financial difficulties, which led them to rely on government assistance and food stamps. After high school, Lipman went to college at the University at Albany where he was on the university's concert board. There, he was in charge of finding acts to perform on campus and setting up concert events. He graduated in 1986 with a degree in communication and rhetoric.

== Career ==
=== 1986–2000: Career beginnings and first Republic Records run ===
After college, Lipman worked at a variety of record labels over the course of 9 years. In 1995, Lipman co-founded Republic Records with his younger brother, Avery. The first act they signed was Bloodhound Gang. KROQ in Los Angeles picked up the band's record, "Fire Water Burn". Their next client was Chumbawamba. After listening to a demo of the band's album, Tubthumper, the Lipman brothers immediately offered to sign them to a deal on their imprint, a co-venture with Universal Records. The band's album went on to sell over 10 million copies worldwide. This began the Lipmans' long-term relationship with Universal Music in which they have held positions at the organization in one form or another since then. Other major acts signed in Republic's early years included 3 Doors Down and Godsmack (among others).

=== 2000–2012: President of Universal Records and Universal Republic ===
In January 2000, Lipman was named the president of Universal Records, and Republic Records was folded into that company. Early in his tenure, Lipman oversaw Universal Records' first Billboard 200 number one album with Nelly's Country Grammar. In his first six years there, Lipman oversaw acts like Jack Johnson, Lil Wayne, Hinder, and Damien Marley along with Republic holdovers, 3 Doors Down and Godsmack (among others).

In 2006, Universal Records was merged into Republic, forming the label Universal Republic Records. Lipman became the president and CEO of that new entity. In that role, Lipman signed artists like Amy Winehouse, Colbie Caillat, India Arie, Mika, Enrique Iglesias, and Florence + the Machine by 2011. Lipman also formed strategic alliances with other labels in order to cross-promote musicians, including Taylor Swift and The Band Perry with Big Machine Records and Drake, Nicki Minaj, and Lil Wayne with Cash Money Records. In 2011, Lipman came across videos of Ariana Grande singing cover songs on YouTube and was so impressed by her vocals that he went on to sign her to a recording contract.

=== 2012–present: Return to Republic name ===
In 2012, Universal return the company to its original name, Republic Records. Lipman helped produce the soundtrack for the film, The Hunger Games. By 2013, Lipman had added artists like Gotye, PSY, and The Weeknd to the Republic fold. In February 2013, Lipman signed another new contract to remain with Republic Records and was also given the new title of chairman and CEO of the company.

In 2014, releases from Ariana Grande and Taylor Swift along with a variety of soundtracks led Republic to become Nielsen's number 1 label in market share. In 2015, Lipman led Republic Records to topping Billboard lists for Top Label and Top Hot 100 Label (among others). The label was, in fact, named the Top Hot 100 Label by Billboard each year from 2014 to 2018. In July 2018, Republic held the top three spots on the Billboard 200 list, a feat that had not been accomplished in 15 years. Drake's Scorpion was number 1, Florence + the Machine's High as Hope number 2, and Post Malone's Beerbongs & Bentleys number 3. In November 2018, Lipman signed Taylor Swift to Republic Records. Her music had been released by Big Machine Records in partnership with Republic since 2007.

For 2021, for the first time, Republic Records was ranked number one on Billboard's three year-end label rankings: "Top Labels", "200 Labels", and "Hot 100 Labels". Billboard then featured Monte and his brother in a December 2021 cover story on Republic Records.

== Philanthropy ==
Outside of music, Lipman is engaged in numerous philanthropic causes. He sits on the boards of the Amy Winehouse Foundation; the T.J. Martell Foundation (which honored him with the "Humanitarian of the Year" award in 2010); the UJA-Federation of New York (which named him 2015's "Music Visionary of the Year"); Robin Hood; and DKMS (Delete Blood Cancer). In 2016, Lipman and his wife Angelina were honored at the 10th Annual DKMS Gala for their contributions to the organization. Among other honors, Lipman also received the Multiple Myeloma Research Foundation's "Spirit of Hope Award" in 2017 and was one of four honorees at the 2018 Angel Ball.
