= Kathy Giusti =

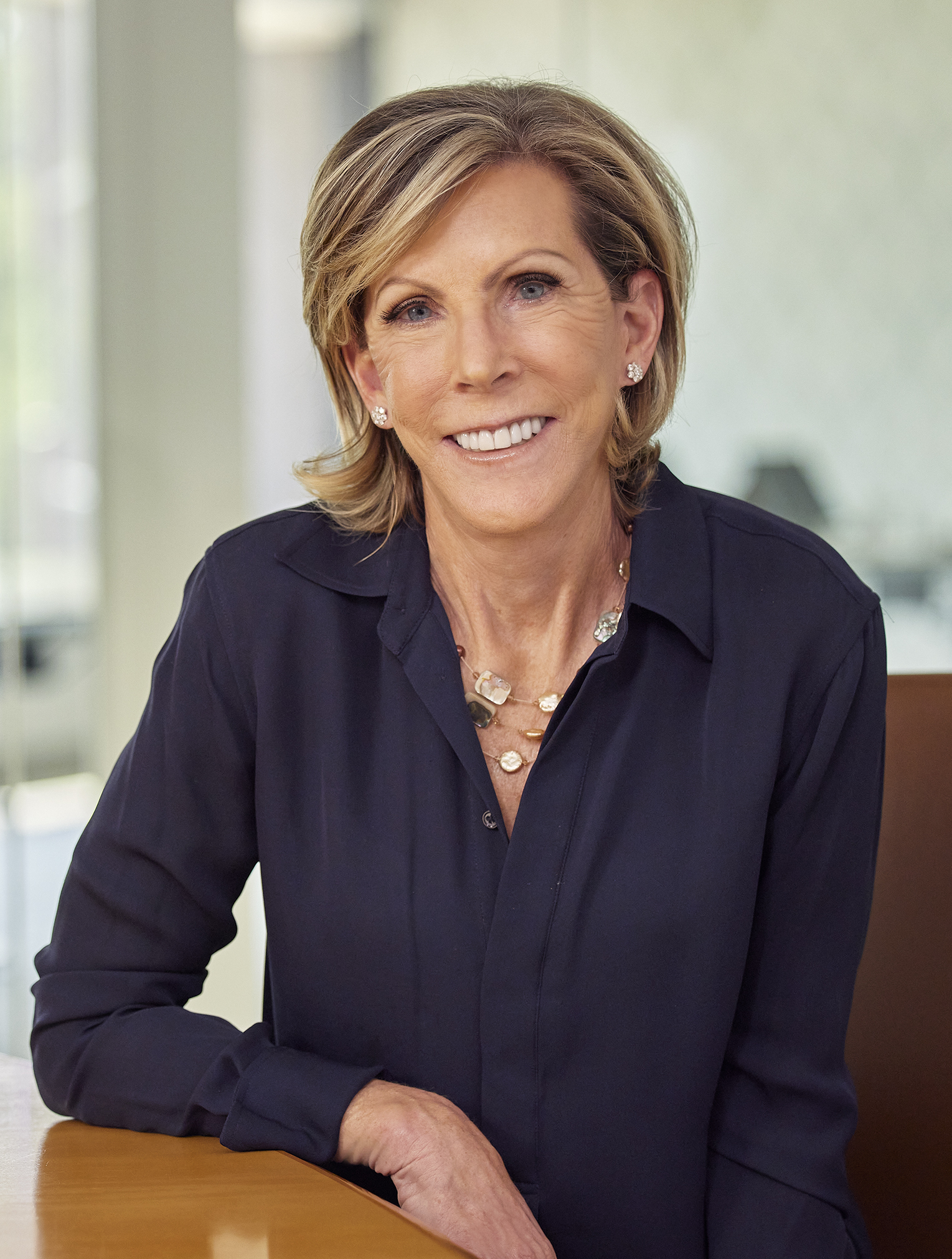
- Kathy Giusti in 2021
- Born: 1958 (age 67–68)
- Resting place: =
- Education: University of Vermont ((B.A.); Harvard Business School (M.B.A.)
- Occupations: Co-founder, Multiple Myeloma Research Foundation (MMRF); Co-chair, Harvard Business School (HBS) Kraft Precision Medicine Accelerator
- Spouse: Paul Giusti
- Children: 2

Kathy Giusti is a business leader, healthcare professional, and author. She is a three-time cancer survivor having been diagnosed with multiple myeloma and breast cancer and skin cancer. Giusti co-founded the Multiple Myeloma Research Foundation (MMRF) where she was CEO and president for nearly two decades. She also co-chaired the Harvard Business School (HBS) Kraft Precision Medicine Accelerator, which she helped found, and was a Senior Fellow at Harvard Business School.

Giusti has been named one of Time magazine's 100 Most Influential People in the world. and named one of Fortune's list of Worlds' 50 Greatest Leaders.

== Career ==
=== Early career ===
Giusti held executive positions in consumer marketing with Gillette/Procter & Gamble and in the pharmaceutical sector with Merck & Co. and G.D. Searle & Company (now Pfizer).

=== The Multiple Myeloma Research Foundation ===
In 1998, with her identical twin sister Karen Andrews, Giusti founded the Multiple Myeloma Research Foundation (the MMRF). The MMRF’s mission is to accelerate a cure for multiple myeloma patients.

As founder and CEO, Giusti has led the MMRF in establishing the Multiple Myeloma Research Consortium (MMRC), the MMRF CoMMpass™ study, CureCloud, the Right Track, and the Myeloma Investment Fund.

Under Giusti the MMRF has raised more than $500 million to fund research, 15 drugs have been approved to treat multiple myeloma, and many clinical trials are underway. These efforts have accelerated the pace at which treatments are brought to patients and more than tripled patients' survival.

=== Harvard Business School ===
Giusti joined the Harvard Business School faculty as Senior Fellow, co-chairing the HBS Kraft Precision Medicine Accelerator, a $20 million endowed program provided by Robert Kraft and the Kraft Family Foundation. The Kraft Accelerator created The Kraft Precision Medicine Accelerator Playbook for Cures.

== Diagnosis ==
In 1996, Giusti was diagnosed with multiple myeloma, an incurable blood cancer. When diagnosed, Giusti was 37 years old and was given three years to live. In 2022, Giusti was diagnosed with early-stage breast cancer as well.

== Appointments ==
Giusti has been appointed to multiple positions and advisory boards, all with a focus on developing cures for cancer. These include:

- National Cancer Advisory Board ref name=":2" />
- National Institutes of Health All of US Research Program/Precision Medicine Initiative (PMI) Working Group
- Faster Cures Advisory Board Changemakers
- IMS Board
- EQRx Board

== Recognition ==
Giusti has received numerous awards for her leadership:

- Named one of Time magazine's 100 Most Influential People in the world
- Ranked #19 on Fortune's list of Worlds' 50 Greatest Leaders
- Recognized as 1 of 34 leaders changing healthcare by Fortune magazine
- Named an Open Science Champion of Change by the White House
- Presented the Harvard Business School Alumni Achievement Award
- Received the Leadership in Personalized Medicine Award by the Personalized Medicine Coalition.
- Presented the 2021 American Association for Cancer Research Distinguished Public Service Award
- Named the Healthcare Businesswomen's Association's Woman of the Year Award

== Publications ==
Giusti has authored or co-authored multiple articles in business, consumer, and scientific publications:

- Reducing Racial Disparities in Cancer Treatment Demands Collective Action, Harvard Business Review
- Reducing Racial Disparities in Cancer Outcomes, Harvard Business Review
- Addressing Demographic Disparities in Clinical Trials, Harvard Business Review
- A New Playbook for Cure-Seeking Nonprofits, Journal of Precision Medicine
- How Nonprofit Foundations Can Sustainably Fund Disease Research, Harvard Business Review
- What It Takes to Lead a Disease Research Foundation, Harvard Business Review
- How Medical Nonprofits Set Winning Strategy, Harvard Business Review^{[}
- One Obstacle to Curing Cancer: Patient Data Isn’t Shared, Harvard Business Review
- What Cancer Researchers Can Learn from Direct-to-Consumer Companies, Harvard Business Review
- Closing Knowledge Gaps to Optimize Patient Outcomes and Advance Precision Medicine, Cancer Journal
- Understanding Differences in Critical Decisions in the Multiple Myeloma Patient Journey in the Era of Precision Medicine, American Journal of Hematology/Oncology
