= Fire Water Burn =

1997 single by Bloodhound Gang

Single by Bloodhound Gang

from the album One Fierce Beer Coaster
- Released: February 9, 1997
- Genre: Rap rock; funk rock
- Length: 4:51
- Label: Jimmy Franks; Republic; Geffen
- Songwriters: Jimmy Pop; Rock Master Scott & the Dynamic Three
- Producer: Jimmy Pop

Bloodhound Gang singles chronology
"Mama Say" (1995)	"Fire Water Burn" (1997)	"I Wish I Was Queer So I Could Get Chicks" (1997)

US 12-inch vinyl cover

Music video
- "Fire Water Burn" on YouTube

"Fire Water Burn" is a song by American rock band Bloodhound Gang, released in February 1997, by Jimmy Franks, Republic and Geffen, as the first single from their second album, One Fierce Beer Coaster (1996). The chorus of the song is derived from "The Roof Is on Fire" by Rock Master Scott & the Dynamic Three, yet sung considerably slower. The song was remixed for the CD single by God Lives Underwater. It charted on two US Billboard charts, reaching number 18 on the Modern Rock Tracks chart and number 28 on the Mainstream Rock Tracks chart. The song was more successful abroad, reaching number two in Norway, number four in the Netherlands, number five in Iceland and the top 10 in Denmark, New Zealand and Sweden; it has achieved platinum status in the latter two countries. The music video for the song features the band performing in the cafeteria of a retirement home.

== Lyrical references ==
"Fire Water Burn" makes a variety of references to numerous figures from popular culture. These include the musicians Barry White, Frank Black, Marvin Gaye, Martha Raye, Lawrence Welk, Kurt Cobain and Jimi Hendrix, the fictional characters Han Solo and Webster, the television show Kojak, the actor Emmanuel Lewis, the author Mark Twain, and U.S. president John F. Kennedy.

The lyric, "the roof, the roof, the roof is on fire; we don't need no water, let the motherfucker burn" is originally from a song by Rock Master Scott & the Dynamic Three from 1984 called "The Roof is on Fire". The lyric "we don't need no water, let the motherfucker burn" is also present on the 1994 song "Burn" by Rancid on their album Let's Go.

Additionally, the song makes a modified quote from the Pixies song "Monkey Gone to Heaven", with the lyrics, "if man is five and the devil is six then that must make me seven / this honky's gone to heaven" rather than "so if man is five / then the devil is six / then God is seven / this monkey's gone to heaven". The song is also musically similar to the latter half of the Pixies song "The Happening" from their album Bossanova.

== Critical reception ==
Larry Flick from Billboard magazine commented on the song, "Is the world ready—or in need—of a new act mining ground broken by the Beastie Boys and Ugly Kid Joe a number of years ago? Probably not, but here comes the Bloodhound Gang anyway. And this [...] proves to be quite the guilty pleasure. The words of this chugging funk/rocker are extremely amusing and are delivered with a monotone howl that gets its bounce from grinding turntable scratching and fuzz guitar lines."

Matt Diehl of Entertainment Weekly wrote of the song, "If you think mumbling hip-hop slang with self-conscious Caucasian stiffness is funny, this dud’s for you."

== Music video ==
The song's accompanying music video features the band performing in the cafeteria of the Mt. Yermom Retirement Home, where tapioca pudding is being served as the day's special meal. As the song progresses, lead vocalist Jimmy Pop leaves the stage and performs numerous spontaneous actions in front of a group of unresponsive senior citizens, including dancing suggestively on tables and making awkward facial gestures. The video culminates when the elderly notice the band, and are rejuvenated by their performance. With the retirement home now filled with a rock concert-like atmosphere, the band exits the stage with numerous senior citizens. The final shot of the video reveals that the retirement home was specifically designated for the deaf, the joke being that if they weren't impaired they would have left upon noticing the band.

The video is introduced by "Pat Minfield" (portrayed by Pop), a spoonerized parody of Matt Pinfield, the then-host of MTV's music video show 120 Minutes (which is presented in the video as 120 Midgets). Minfield, in a fashion similar to Pinfield, attempts to connect Alex Karras, Blazing Saddles, Mel Brooks, Anne Bancroft, The Graduate, Simon & Garfunkel, Diana Ross, The Wiz and Michael Jackson.

== Track listings ==
- US 12-inch vinyl and European maxi-CD single
1. "Fire Water Burn" (Rudimental Jammy Jam) – 4:50
2. "Fire Water Burn" (Jim Makin' Jamaican Mix) – 5:01
3. "Fire Water Burn" (We Don't Need No God Lives Underwater Mix) – 3:31
4. "Fire Water Burn" (A Coo Dic Ver Din) – 4:42
- European CD single
1. "Fire Water Burn" (Rudimental Jammy Jam) – 4:50
2. "Fire Water Burn" (Jim Makin' Jamaican Mix) – 5:01
- Australian CD single
1. "Fire Water Burn" (Rudimental Jammy Jam)
2. "Fire Water Burn" (Jim Makin' Jamaican Mix)
3. "Fire Water Burn" (We Don't Need No God Lives Underwater Mix)
4. "Fire Water Burn" (A Coo Dic Ver Din)
5. "Fire Water Burn" (Donkey edit)

== Charts ==
=== Weekly charts ===
Chart (1997)	Peak position
Australia (ARIA)	13
Australia Alternative (ARIA)	3
Belgium (Ultratip Bubbling Under Flanders)	18
Denmark (IFPI)	9
Europe (Eurochart Hot 100)	89
Iceland (Íslenski Listinn Topp 40)	5
Netherlands (Dutch Top 40)	4
Netherlands (Single Top 100)	7
New Zealand (Recorded Music NZ)	6
Norway (VG-lista)	2
Quebec Airplay (ADISQ)	32
Sweden (Sverigetopplistan)	6
US Alternative Airplay (Billboard)	18
US Mainstream Rock Airplay (Billboard)	28

=== Year-end charts ===
Chart (1997)	Position
Australia (ARIA)	75
Iceland (Íslenski Listinn Topp 40)	81
Netherlands (Dutch Top 40)	42
Netherlands (Single Top 100)	46
New Zealand (RIANZ)	15
Sweden (Topplistan)	13
US Modern Rock Tracks (Billboard)	87

== Certifications ==
Region	Certification	Certified units/sales
Australia (ARIA)	Gold	35,000^{^}
New Zealand (RMNZ)	Platinum	10,000^{*}
Norway (IFPI Norway)	Gold	
Sweden (GLF)	Platinum	30,000^{^}
^{*} Sales figures based on certification alone.^{^} Shipments figures based on certification alone.
