= The Roof Is on Fire =

1984 song by Rock Master Scott & the Dynamic Three

Single by Rock Master Scott & the Dynamic Three
- B-side: "Request Line"
- Released: 1984
- Genre: Hip-hop
- Length: 5:30
- Label: Reality; Fantasy
- Songwriters: G. Wigfall; J. Bloodrock; C. Evans; R. Fowler; C. Pettiford

"The Roof Is on Fire" is a song by Rock Master Scott & the Dynamic Three, released as a single in 1984. It reached number five on the Billboard Hot Dance Music/Maxi-Singles Sales chart.

== Samples and interpolations ==
The intro of "The Roof Is on Fire" is sampled in the Chemical Brothers' "Hey Boy Hey Girl" (the actual lyrics are "Hey girls, b-boys"), but taken from Armand van Helden's "I Can't Wait (House Head & B-Boy Collaboration Mix)", as the riff at 11 seconds into "I Can't Wait" is also sampled in "Hey Boy Hey Girl" at the beginning. The chorus of "The Roof Is on Fire" is interpolated in the Bloodhound Gang's "Fire Water Burn", Coal Chamber's "Sway", Rancid's "Burn", Quad City DJ's "Party Over Here", YACHT's "Dystopia (The Earth Is on Fire)", Bratmobile's "Polaroid Baby", the Pharcyde's "Return of the B-Boy", Nigel & Marvin's "Follow de Leader", Kumbia Kings' "Fuego", as well as "Her Hair Is on Fire" by Semi Precious Weapons.

== Charts ==
Chart (1985)	Peak position
US Hot R&B/Hip-Hop Songs (Billboard)	45
