= Rock Master Scott & the Dynamic Three =

American hip hop group

- Origin: The Bronx, New York, U.S.
- Genres: Old-school hip hop
- Years active: 1981–1991, 2008
- Labels: Reality/Fantasy; Profile
- Past members: Rock Master Scott; Charlie Prince; MBG; Slick Rick

Rock Master Scott & the Dynamic Three was an American old-school hip hop group best known for the singles "Request Line" and "The Roof Is on Fire", both of which have been sampled by many other groups, for a large variety of genres. Rock Master Scott & the Dynamic Three grew up in the Bronx, New York City, where three of the members lived in the same building on Webster Avenue.

== History ==
As youngsters, Richard Fowler (a.k.a. Slick Rick; not to be confused with the more famous rapper of the same name) and Gregory Wigfall (a.k.a. MBG or Master Blaster Greg) played sports together, while Charles Pettiford (a.k.a. King Charlie Prince) preferred to remain indoors playing music. Richard was also into music, and he played drums, mixed music, and belonged to another group; however, this was never known to Charles and MBG (Gregory Wigfall).

Wigfall, a photographer, gathered the two together to perform at Le’ Joint, a New Haven, Connecticut nightclub run by his cousins Cody and Andre. Fowler wanted nothing to do with Pettiford due to a previous dispute about his childhood sweetheart. Therefore, Fowler wanted another person, Robert Jones (a.k.a. Buster B) to accompany them. Buster lived in 2000 Valentine Avenue which was the building across from 1985 Webster Avenue. Wigfall brought Pettiford anyway, along with both Fowler and Buster. The group did not have a name, so they were just called 'Charlie D and the Crew'. They performed well and remained with Gregory's family members for several days before returning to their homes in New York City. They then decided to call the group The Devilish Three. Buster was an MC for another DJ, Smitty Rock; his MC partner name was Charlie Rock. Since Buster was not available, Wigfall replaced Buster.

The Devilish Three name changed when they entered a rap battle at a nightclub, Your Spot, across the street from their building. It was formerly a Burger King fast food restaurant which was converted by Jerry Blood Rock. Intending for it to be a neighborhood club, Rock wanted to secure known MCs to perform there as a grand opening. The Devilish Three was one of the groups he asked, but they did not have a DJ at the time. They knew a neighborhood DJ, Kool Dee. He had taught Pettiford how to mix on the turntables and scratch records. They Kool Dee to be their DJ for this battle. He agreed, but they never had time to practice with him, and so they end up practicing amongst themselves. Although the group won the battle with Kool Dee as their DJ, he was busy with other endeavors, so a DJ who could be more devoted was sought. The trio asked Mark Scott (a.k.a. Master Scott) to join their crew. Master Scott had been the DJ for another group at the Your Spot battle.

The group was inspired by other popular groups. They participated in many battles. Initially, they practiced occasionally at MBG's mother's house, but they began practicing even more at Slick Rick's mother's house. She acted as a mentor and provided inspiration. When they rehearsed in her living room, she sat there on a couch, providing insight and criticism while also acting as hostess. She was involved in their act until her death.

The group started performing with other local groups and at locations like T Connection and Harlem World as well as places in New Jersey with other groups such as Sweet, Slick and Sly.

Some shows were organized by a promoter, Armstrong. Scott had a connection with another promoter, Man Dip Lite, who always had shows lined up for other popular groups. Man Dip Lite organized gigs for Master Scott & the Dynamic Three at a roller skating rink in Long Island.

=== Recordings ===
Eventually, Jerry Blood Rock wanted to produce a studio recording of the group. Months after he asked them, they recorded their first song, "It's Life (You Gotta Think Twice)", at Unique Recording Studio. DJ Wiz Kid was responsible for the music. This was the first time the group had ever seen a recording studio. Jerry showed the group the pressing of the records on his record label, Reality Records. These records were hawked to local record stores. Charlie Prince was working part-time at a record store, Rock N Soul. He convinced the store owner to buy a few boxes. After the group began receiving some radio exposure, Profile Records became involved, particularly for distribution. The group became neighborhood superstars in 1983. In 1984, they recorded the songs "Request Line" and "The Roof Is on Fire", using two different studios. One was Joey Moore's small home studio; Moore was one of Jerry Blood Rock's associates. They laid the track "The Roof Is on Fire" there along with "Request Line", then took it to Unique Recording Studio to complete the work. Once Reality Records released the new music, it was well received.

=== Expanded performance radius ===
As the group's popularity increased, shows were booked more often and further away from the group's New York homes. For example, Master Scott and Charlie Prince flew to a performance in Fayetteville, North Carolina while Rick and MBG remained in New Jersey. That is when they met Divine Sounds. Eventually the group performed on a tour, The Jamatron. Other rap artists included Kurtis Blow, Doug E. Fresh, UTFO, Lisa Lisa, Roxanne Shante, Whodini, and The Real Roxanne.

== Later career and retirement ==
The Dynamic Three released a subsequent album, Still on Fire, in 2008.

Rock Master Scott retired to Stewartsville, New Jersey.

Charlie Prince produced albums for up-and-coming artists such as Sean XLG Mitchell, Murda Mommies and Triple T. He has also released his own music, as Charlie Prince and the Family. His albums include From the Dark Womb and Just Matured at It. Charlie Prince also started I See Entertainment Inc. in 2004. He continues to record in his home studio in Virginia.

MBG joined the Connecticut State Police in 1985. He retired from being a state trooper and became a photographer/videographer.

== Slick Rick confusion ==
The member of Rock Master Scott & the Dynamic Three known as Slick Rick is not the more famous rapper also known as Slick Rick. The two were rappers at the same time, and both were on the same label, Reality Records, which has only added to the confusion. The Dynamic Three's performer contends that he is the original Slick Rick, as the release date in 1984 of "Request Line" by Rockmaster Scott & the Dynamic Three precedes the release in 1985 of "The Show" by Doug E. Fresh and the Get Fresh Crew, which features MC Ricky D who would eventually use the moniker Slick Rick.

== Discography ==
The group released more than these two songs, but "The Roof Is on Fire" (1984), which charted at No. 5 on the Billboard Hot Dance Music/Maxi-Singles Sales chart was the main focus at the time. The A-side track "Request Line" reached No. 21 on the Hot R&B/Hip-Hop Singles & Tracks chart.

The phrase and hook from "The Roof Is on Fire" has become more notable than the group itself, having been sampled by groups such as Chemical Brothers, Coal Chamber, Kid 'n Play, Rancid, the Pharcyde, the Bloodhound Gang, the Soca Boys and many others.
