= Gelotophobia =

Fear of being laughed at

- Specialty: Psychology

Gelotophobia is a fear of being laughed at, a type of social phobia. While most people do not like being laughed at, in his clinical observations, German psychotherapist and psychoanalyst Michael Titze (1996) discovered that some of his patients seemed to be primarily worried about being laughed at. They tended to scan their environment for signs of laughter and ridicule. Furthermore, they reported that they had the impression of being ridiculous themselves. Additionally, Titze observed a specific movement pattern among them when they thought they were being laughed at—awkward, wooden movements that resembled those of wooden puppets. He described this state as "Pinocchio-syndrome".

== Causes ==
From the clinical observations a model of the causes and consequences of gelotophobia was drawn up so that the condition could be studied scientifically. The model claims that gelotophobia can be caused by any one of three things at different stages of development:

The putative causes of gelotophobia:

- In infancy: development of primary shame failure to develop an interpersonal bridge (e.g. unsupportive infant–caregiver interactions).
- In childhood and youth: repeated traumatic experiences of not being taken seriously or being laughed at/ridiculed (e.g. bullying), or online bullying (e.g cyberbullying)
- In adulthood: intense traumatic experience of being laughed at or ridiculed (e.g. mockery).

The consequences of gelotophobia:

- Social withdrawal to avoid being ridiculed.
- Appearing 'cold as ice'/humourless.
- Psychosomatic disturbances, e.g. blushing, tension headache, trembling, dizziness, sleep disturbances.
- Demonstrating 'Pinocchio Syndrome': clumsy, 'agelotic' face, 'wooden puppet' appearance.
- Lack of liveliness, spontaneity, joy.
- Inability to experience humour/laughter as relaxing and joyful social experiences.
- Anger when being laughed at by other people (in some cases, this results in violent attacks on the people who were laughing).

Later this model was revised and expanded.

== Diagnosis ==
There is a fifteen-item questionnaire for the subjective assessment of gelotophobia, e.g. the GELOPH<15>. This questionnaire has been used to show that gelotophobia exists, to varying degrees, in a normal population. It has been found on every continent and has, so far, had samples taken from 72 countries and the GELOPH<15> has been translated into over 42 different languages.

Different countries vary in the number of people within the population, who are gelotophobes. The sociologist Christie Davies predicts a higher prevalence of gelotophobia in hierarchically organized societies where the main means of social control is shame.

Research into gelotophobia using the GELOPH scales shows that empirically, the condition exists outside of people who seek therapy due to experiencing a problematic fear of being laughed at. In the first studies, gelotophobes were distinguished from other people with shame-based problems and non-shame based neurotics and samples of a normal population. Basically, this means that even though gelotophobia shares similar problems, high scores were also found for these criteria in individuals with Asperger's syndrome and Cluster A personality disorders.

The fear of being laughed at has also been studied among children and adolescents using modifications of these diagnostic instruments

=== Emotions ===
Although at face value the emotions relating to gelotophobia would be predominantly fear, there is a distinct interplay with three dominant emotions: low levels of joy, high levels of fear, and high levels of shame. More importantly, where shame in a typical week exceeds joy, gelotophobia is more likely to develop. Gelotophobes say that they are bad at regulating their emotions, and they more easily pick up the negative moods of other people. They also suppress expression of their emotions and do not share their feelings readily with others.

=== Perception and personality ===
Gelotophobes do not have the ability to understand the difference between playful teasing and crueller forms such as bullying ridicule. This means that even if someone is trying to be friendly and playful, a gelotophobe will feel apprehensive and mistake the interaction for ridicule. It can also mean that people may feel they are being bullied when in fact they are not.

Gelotophobes are often located in both the Eysenck PEN and the Big Five models of personality. Gelotophobia correlates highly with introversion and neuroticism, and on older P-scales, gelotophobes score higher in psychoticism. The dimensional assessment of personality pathology, a DSM personality disorder instrument, showed that those with a fear of being laughed at tend to be socially avoidant and submissive, as well as having identity problems. Social withdrawal and suspiciousness most frequently predicted gelotophobia.

=== Strengths, intelligence and humour ability ===
A number of tests show that gelotophobes often underestimate their own potential and achievements. Gelotophobes tend to see themselves as less virtuous than people who know them. Similarly, in an intelligence study, gelotophobes consistently underestimated their intellectual performance by as much as 6 IQ points. Gelotophobes have a different experience of laughter: it does not lift their mood or make them more cheerful. They personally characterise their own humour as being inept, yet once again, tests show that they are no different from other people at making witty remarks and humour.

== Politics ==
Paul Lewis (Boston College, US) speculated whether political gelotophobia might affect elections in the US ("The twin fears of being effectively mocked or ineffective in mocking others [too harsh, blunt, tasteless] led candidates to aggressive and proactive strategies [going on TV to show they can take a joke, be funny—anything to avoid being rendered pathetically ridiculous or inappropriately derisive]") [p. 42, conference abstract from the 2009 conference of the International Society for Humor Studies ISHS in Long Beach, California]; Sociologist Christie Davies, who is also president of the ISHS, comments satirically on the results of recent elections in the UK. He noticed that losers in those elections were frequently bald—"To be bald is to suffer from gelotophobia, to fear being laughed at; to fear being laughed at is to fear disorder; to fear disorder is to embrace absolutism".

== See also ==
- Gelotophilia, the joy of being laughed at
- Katagelasticism, the joy of laughing at others
- Related feelings
  - Emotional insecurity
  - Inferiority complex
  - Self-contempt
