= Multiple Myeloma Research Foundation =

Non-profit organization in the U.S.

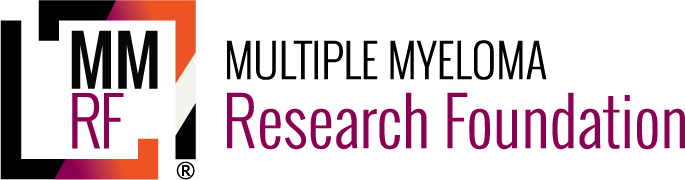
- Abbreviation: MMRF
- Founded: 1998; 28 years ago
- Founders: Kathy Giusti and Karen Andrews
- Type: Nonprofit organization
- Location: United States

The Multiple Myeloma Research Foundation (MMRF) is a charitable organization dedicated to multiple myeloma, an incurable blood cancer. The MMRF runs as if it were a for-profit business, expecting high returns from the money the organization raises from donors.

== History ==
MMRF was founded in 1998 by twin sisters Kathy Giusti and Karen Andrews, following Kathy's diagnosis with multiple myeloma. Giusti, a pharmaceutical company executive and Harvard Business School Alum, wanted to encourage researchers to develop treatments for multiple myeloma by using business models rather than academic models of drug development.

== About The MMRF ==
MMRF is a private funder of multiple myeloma research, having raised over $120 million since its inception to contribute funding to more than 120 laboratories worldwide. MMRF funding contributes to diverse research strategies to yield long-, mid-, and short-term results in an effort to deliver better treatments to patients faster: basic science programs to better understand the disease and identify new druggable targets through genomics and proteomics research; validation programs to prioritize new compounds and combinations based on key targets; and clinical trials conducted at a number of myeloma centers.

In 2009, the MMRF funded research into 30 compounds at the pre-clinical stage. By 2013 it had raised more than $250 million and its work has helped gain approval of six new drugs to treat the disease.

== See also ==
- Multiple Myeloma Research Consortium
