= Republic Records =

Record label, division of Universal Music Group

- Logo used 2012
- Parent company: Universal Music Group
- Founded: 1995; 31 years ago
- Founder: Monte Lipman; Avery Lipman
- Genre: Various
- Country of origin: United States
- Location: New York City, New York, U.S.
- Official website: republicrecords.com

Republic Records is an American record label owned by Universal Music Group. Based in New York City, it was founded by Avery Lipman and Monte Lipman as an independent label in 1995, and was acquired by UMG in 2000. Republic was initially an imprint of the Universal Motown Republic Group, and was renamed Universal Republic Records after a reorganization in 2006 before going back to its original name in 2012.

== History ==
=== Foundation and Universal Records: 1994–2005 ===
According to Avery Lipman, he and his brother Monte conceived the idea for Republic Records at their apartment in New York. Lipman stated that both had previously been employed by record companies and were in between jobs at the time. They began putting records out as a hobby, the first of which was the Bloodhound Gang's Dingleberry Haze. Republic Records was formed in 1995 as a subsidiary of MCA's Geffen Records, but soon after its foundation, the distribution changed to the newly established Universal Records.

In January 2000, it was announced that the Universal Music Group acquired the Lipman brothers' Republic Records as a wholly owned subsidiary. Monte Lipman was named president of the Universal Records label, while Avery Lipman became Republic's president.

=== Universal Republic Records: 2006–2012 ===
In 2006, corporate restructuring saw the formation of Universal Republic Records through a merger between the two labels. Monte Lipman became the president and CEO of the restructured label while Avery Lipman served as co-president and COO. Other changes were made at the label's parent, Universal Motown Republic Group, during the summer of 2011. Universal Motown Records was shut down, transferring its artists to the newly recreated Motown Records or Universal Republic Records. Universal Republic Records became a stand-alone label and the Universal Motown Republic Group was shut down. In August 2011, the restructured Universal Republic signed Ariana Grande to a record contract.

=== Republic Records revival: 2012–2024 ===
In October 2012, Universal Republic Records returned to the Republic Records moniker. Just prior to the label's return to the Republic name, it signed Canadian artist The Weeknd through his imprint label, XO. In addition to artists' albums, the label has released soundtracks with the Fox (Star), NBC (The Voice), and former UMG parent Universal Pictures (Fifty Shades and Sing), among numerous other partnerships, films, and television series. Republic Records had songs in six of the top-10 spots on the Mediabase Top 40 Chart in 2015, tying a 2013 record. Also in 2015, the label signed American rapper and singer, Post Malone.

In November 2017, the company was named Variety's Hitmaker Label of the Year. In 2018, Taylor Swift signed to Republic Records after releasing her music through the Republic imprint, Big Machine Records, for a majority of her career. In December of that year, Republic partnered with Sony Pictures on the release of the soundtrack for Spider-Man: Into the Spider-Verse. The soundtrack's lead single was Post Malone and Swae Lee's "Sunflower" which reached number one on the Billboard Hot 100 and broke the record for most weeks in the top ten of the Hot R&B/Hip-Hop Songs chart at 45. Early 2019 saw the signing of a reunited Jonas Brothers, as well.

Also in 2019, Republic Records was named the "Label of the Year" by both Billboard and Variety. It has been Billboard's label of the year for 4 of the last 5 years and Variety's for each of the last three. Republic was also named Billboard's Hot 100 Label of the Year for the sixth straight time. Five Republic albums (Ariana Grande's Thank U, Next, Taylor Swift's Lover, Post Malone's Beerbongs & Bentleys, Drake's Scorpion and Post Malone's Hollywood's Bleeding) also appeared in the top 10 of the year-end Billboard 200 chart.

In 2020, Republic Records partnered up with JYP Entertainment for the South Korean girl group Twice as the group's first American label and distributor. Twice will be the first artist from JYP Entertainment to be powered under the alliance. Twice's signing represents a diversifying market for K-pop in the US. On April 8, 2020, it was stated that the record has partnered up with the South Korean girl group (G)I-dle after the release of their third EP I Trust, marking the group's official debut in the US. At the 2020 iHeartRadio Music Awards, Republic Records won "Label of the Year".

At the 2021 iHeartRadio Music Awards, Republic Records won "Label of the Year". For 2021, for the first time, Republic Records was ranked number one on Billboard's three year-end label rankings: "Top Labels", "200 Labels", and "Hot 100 Labels". Billboard then featured the Lipman brothers in a December 2021 cover story on Republic Records.

Republic Records became the first label to partner with DistroKid, allowing it to mine data from the company looking for new artists. The initiative began in 2021 and allowed DistroKid to receive a finder's fee for any new artist signed to the label. In January 2021, the label had five of the top seven albums on the Billboard 200 chart, including the top three spots with Morgan Wallen's Dangerous: The Double Album, Taylor Swift's Evermore, and Pop Smoke's Shoot for the Stars, Aim for the Moon. The Weeknd's After Hours and Ariana Grande's Positions were sixth and seventh respectively. That month, Republic also had six of the top ten albums on the Rolling Stone album chart and nine of the top 20 songs on the Rolling Stone song chart. In March 2021, Taylor Swift became the first Republic artist to win the Grammy Award for Album of the Year for her album, Folklore. On November 24, 2021, Jim Roppo and Wendy Goldstein were named co-presidents of Republic Records.

Since August 2021, Universal Music Group began to launch and expand the Republic Records imprint in international markets. The label made its first International debut in China via its local subsidiary UMG China on August 16, 2021. The label launched in Philippines via its local subsidiary UMG Philippines on July 22, 2022, with domestic artists Darren Espanto, Elha Nympha and Zack Tabudlo among other artists who were signed to the label.

In 2022, Republic Records expanded its current partnership with JYP Entertainment to include Itzy and Stray Kids. Republic Records partnered up with NBCUniversal Entertainment Japan to include fripSide. This was later expanded to cover all of their artists, alongside worldwide distribution of artists and catalogs, A&R, marketing and business development.

At the 2022 iHeartRadio Music Awards, Republic Records won "Label of the Year". For the second year in a row, Billboard listed Republic Records as number one on its three 2022 year-end label rankings, including "Top Labels".

In 2023, Republic Records had the longest streak for a label atop the Billboard 200 in 25 years, including Morgan Wallen's One Thing at a Time, Taylor Swift's Midnights, and Stray Kids' 5-STAR. On December 6, 2023, Republic had the top six albums on the Billboard 200. It was the first time in 60 years the same label had released the top five albums on the chart.

=== Republic Corps: 2024–present ===
In February 2024, Republic was reorganized under the newly structured umbrella of Republic Corps, a music label unit formed by parent Universal Music Group. As part of reorganizing UMG's coastal operations, Republic was aligned with Island Records and Def Jam Recordings under the "East Coast" banner; Monte Lipman, the label's co-founder, oversees the New York City operations.

== Releases ==
The Republic Records logo from 1996 to 2006

Republic Records released the Bloodhound Gang's 1994 EP, Dingleberry Haze, and their first LP, Use Your Fingers. Kevin Rudolf's single, "Let It Rock", was certified triple platinum by the Recording Industry Association of America. Jay Sean's debut single, "Down", sold six million copies in the United States and received a large airplay on radio worldwide. Sean's follow-up single, "Do You Remember", sold over one million copies.

Taylor Swift was first signed to Nashville-based Big Machine Records, recording her first six studio albums with the label. As her contract with Big Machine ended in 2018, she signed with Republic, with her first single "ME!" with the label released on April 26, 2019. Jack Johnson has received a number of gold and platinum certifications. Damian Marley's debut album was certified gold and sold one million copies worldwide.

Other prominent Republic releases in recent years have come from acts like Ariana Grande (2013's Yours Truly, 2014's My Everything, 2016's Dangerous Woman, 2018's Sweetener, 2019's Thank U, Next, 2020's Positions, and 2024's Eternal Sunshine); the Jonas Brothers (2019's Happiness Begins and 2023's The Album); Taylor Swift (2019's Lover, 2020's Folklore and Evermore, 2021's Fearless (Taylor's Version) and Red (Taylor's Version), 2022's Midnights, 2023's Speak Now (Taylor's Version) and 1989 (Taylor's Version), 2024's The Tortured Poets Department, and 2025's The Life of a Showgirl); The Weeknd (2013's Kiss Land, 2015's Beauty Behind the Madness, 2016's Starboy, 2020s After Hours, 2022's Dawn FM;, and 2025's Hurry Up Tomorrow). Florence and the Machine (2015's How Big, How Blue, How Beautiful, 2018's High as Hope, and 2022's Dance Fever); Lorde (2013's Pure Heroine, 2017's Melodrama, and 2021's Solar Power); James Blake (2019's Assume Form and 2021's Friends That Break Your Heart); Pearl Jam (2020's Gigaton), Poppy (2022's Stagger); fripSide (2022's Infinite Resonance) and Kim Petras (2023's Feed the Beast and Problématique).

== Artists ==
As of 2026, the current Republic Records roster includes 831, Anitta, Any Gabrielly, Ariana Grande, Bastille, Benee, Bo Burnham, Clairo, Coi Leray, Cortis, Conan Gray, Cruz Beckham, Daniel Caesar, Drake, Em Beihold, FLO, Fujii Kaze, Florence and the Machine, fripSide, G Herbo, Girlset, Glass Animals, Huntr/X, Itzy, James Bay, James Blake, John Mellencamp, Julia Michaels, Kid Cudi, Kira Kosarin, Kylie Cantrall, Leith Ross, Lil Tecca, Lil Wayne, Metro Boomin, Miranda Lambert, Morgan Wallen, Nate Sib, Nayeon, Nicki Minaj, Nmixx, Noah Kahan, Of Monsters and Men, Peach PRC, Pearl Jam, Peter Gabriel, Post Malone,Saja Boy , Seth MacFarlane, Shania Twain, Ski Mask The Slump God, Stephen Sanchez, Stevie Wonder, Stray Kids, Swedish House Mafia, Taylor Swift, The Weeknd, Tomorrow X Together, Twice, SosMula, Volbeat, Wargasm, Yoshino Nanjo and Zayn Malik.

== Associated labels and imprints ==
- 21 Entertainment
- American Recordings
- Anti
- MoveTact Recordings (digital distribution)
- AP DHILLON INC
- Aware Records
- Babydoll Music
- Beauty Marks Entertainment
- Boominati Worldwide
- Boywithuke LLC
- Brushfire Records
- Casablanca Records
- Cash Money Records
- Def Jam Recordings
- Electric Feel Records
- Galactic Records
- Federal Films
- The Heavy Group
- Heavy On It Records
- Hikari-Ultra
- Hybe (For North American releases)
  - Big Hit Music (distribution for Tomorrow X Together and Cortis' releases)
  - Hybe Latin America (distribution for Santos Bravos' releases)
- Island Records
- Imperial Music
- Lava Records
- JYP Entertainment (For North American releases)
- Mercury Records
- Motown Records
- Monkeywrench Records
- NBCUniversal Entertainment Japan (For North American releases)
- One Non Hispanic
- Real World Records
- Republic Kids & Family
- Republic Nashville
- Rowdy Records
- Schoolboy Records
- SRC Records
- So What the Fuss Records
- Universal Records
- Uptown Records
- Victor Victor Worldwide
- Taylor Swift (eponymous personal label for digital releases)
- Visva Records
- Wicked Awesome Records
- WakeOne (distribution for Izna and Alpha Drive One releases)
- XO
- Young Money Entertainment
- Jackson Pendergist
- Riteorwrong KVH Entertainment
