= Bloodhound Gang discography =

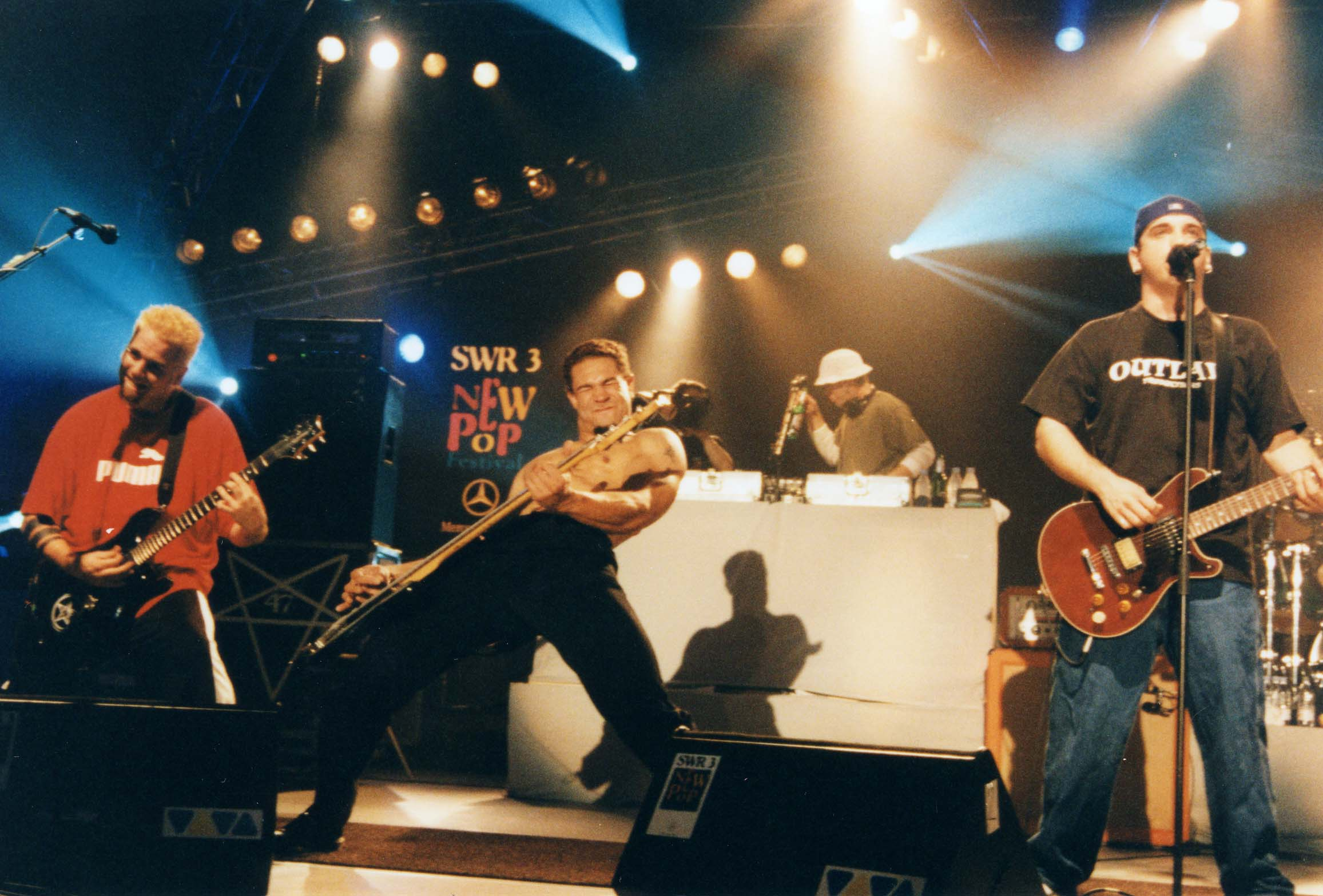
- Studio albums: 5
- Extended plays: 2
- Compilation albums: 2
- Singles: 15
- Video albums: 1
- Music videos: 15

The discography of American rock group the Bloodhound Gang consists of five studio albums, two compilation albums, one video album, two extended plays, 15 singles and 15 music videos.

== Albums ==
=== Studio albums ===
List of studio albums, with selected chart positions and certifications
Title	Album details	Peak chart positions										Certifications
Title	Album details	US	AUS	AUT	CAN	GER	NLD	NZ	SWE	SWI	UK	Certifications
Use Your Fingers	Released: July 18, 1995 (US); Label: Columbia; Format: CD, cassette, LP	—	—	—	—	—	—	—	—	—	185	
One Fierce Beer Coaster	Released: August 5, 1996; Re-released: December 3, 1996; Label: Republic, Geffen (re-release); Format: CD, cassette, LP	57	71	11	—	14	18	3	20	—	150	RIAA: Gold; RMNZ: Platinum
Hooray for Boobies	Released: February 29, 2000 (US) October 4, 1999 (EU); Label: Geffen; Format: CD, cassette, LP	14	38	1	6	1	58	5	19	2	37	RIAA: Platinum; ARIA: Gold; BPI: Gold; BVMI: Platinum; IFPI AUT: Platinum; IFPI SWE: Gold; IFPI SWI: Platinum; MC: Platinum; RMNZ: Gold
Hefty Fine	Released: September 27, 2005; Label: Geffen; Format: CD, LP, digital download	24	32	4	—	7	75	36	26	24	109	IFPI AUT: Gold
Hard-Off	Released: December 18, 2015; Label: Jimmy Franks Recording Company; Format: CD, LP, digital download	—	—	—	—	—	—	—	—	—	—	
"—" denotes a recording that did not chart or was not released in that territory.

=== Compilation albums ===
List of compilation albums, with selected chart positions
Title	Album details	Peak chart positions
Title	Album details	GER
Playlist Your Way	Released: February 24, 2009 (US); Label: Geffen; Format: CD, digital download	—
Show Us Your Hits	Released: December 21, 2010 (US); Label: Geffen; Format: CD, digital download	10
"—" denotes a recording that did not chart or was not released in that territory.

=== Video albums ===
List of video albums
Title	Album details
One Fierce Beer Run	Released: August 12, 2003 (US); Label: Geffen; Format: DVD

=== Demos ===
List of demos
Title	Details
Just Another Demo	Released: 1990; Label: none (self-released); Format: Cassette; Released as Bang Chamber 8. Not to be confused with the followup, also titled Just Another Demo. The music on this album is synth-pop which has no connection, lyrically or otherwise, to the modern sound of the Bloodhound Gang.
Just Another Demo	Released: 1993; Label: none (self-released); Format: Cassette
The Original Motion Picture Soundtrack to Hitler's Handicapped Helpers	Released: April 1, 1994; Label: none (self-released); Format: Cassette

== Extended plays ==
List of extended plays
Title	Details
Dingleberry Haze	Released: November 20, 1994; Label: Cheese Factory; Format: CD, cassette, LP
One Censored Beer Coaster	Released: December 3, 1996 (US); Label: Jimmy Franks Recording Company; Format: CD, cassette, LP

== Singles ==
List of singles, with selected chart positions and certifications, showing year released and album name
Title	Year	Peak chart positions										Certifications	Album
Title	Year	US	US Alt.	AUS	AUT	GER	NLD	NZ	SWE	SWI	UK	Certifications	Album
"Mama Say"	1995	—	—	—	—	—	—	—	—	—	—		Use Your Fingers
"K.I.D.S. Incorporated"	1995	—	—	—	—	—	—	—	—	—	—		Use Your Fingers
"Fire Water Burn"	1997	—	18	13	—	—	7	6	6	—	—	ARIA: Gold; IFPI SWE: Platinum	One Fierce Beer Coaster
"I Wish I Was Queer So I Could Get Chicks"	1997	—	—	—	—	—	—	32	—	—	—		One Fierce Beer Coaster
"Why's Everybody Always Pickin' on Me?"	1997	—	—	64	—	—	85	7	—	—	56		One Fierce Beer Coaster
"Along Comes Mary"	1999	—	—	—	5	6	—	—	—	13	—	BVMI: Gold; IFPI AUT: Gold	Hooray for Boobies
"The Bad Touch"	1999	52	6	5	3	1	19	4	1	4	4	ARIA: Platinum; BPI: Platinum; BVMI: Gold; IFPI AUT: Gold; IFPI SWE: 2× Platinum; IFPI SWI: Gold; RMNZ: Gold	Hooray for Boobies
"The Ballad of Chasey Lain"	2000	—	—	68	11	12	71	—	35	23	15		Hooray for Boobies
"Mope"	2000	—	—	—	—	34	—	—	56	77	—		Hooray for Boobies
"The Inevitable Return of the Great White Dope"	2000	—	—	70	37	35	—	—	—	55	—		Hooray for Boobies
"Foxtrot Uniform Charlie Kilo"	2005	—	—	25	10	15	90	—	—	47	47		Hefty Fine
"Uhn Tiss Uhn Tiss Uhn Tiss"	2005	—	—	46	10	15	25	—	—	76	—		Hefty Fine
"No Hard Feelings"	2006	—	—	—	—	—	—	—	—	—	—		Hefty Fine
"Screwing You on the Beach at Night"	2007	—	—	—	59	33	—	—	—	—	—		Show Us Your Hits
"Altogether Ooky"	2010	—	—	—	—	—	—	—	—	—	—		Show Us Your Hits
"Chew Toy"	2014	—	—	—	—	—	—	—	—	—	—		Hard-Off
"American Bitches"	2014	—	—	—	—	—	—	—	—	—	—		Hard-Off
"Dimes"	2015	—	—	—	—	—	—	—	—	—	—		Hard-Off
"Clean Up in Aisle Sexy"	2015	—	—	—	—	—	—	—	—	—	—		Hard-Off
"Uncool as Me"	2015	—	—	—	—	—	—	—	—	—	—		Hard-Off
"—" denotes a recording that did not chart or was not released in that territory.

== Other songs ==
- ”It's Tricky” (1996) – a Run-D.M.C. cover originally from the album One Fierce Beer Coaster, later released on the album Take a Bite Outta Rhyme: A Rock Tribute to Rap
- ”Jackass” (2001) – Originally written for an aborted Jackass television soundtrack, finally released on the soundtrack to the film American Pie 2, also appears on the soundtrack to Jay and Silent Bob Strike Back

== Music videos ==
List of music videos, with directors, showing year released
Title	Year	Director(s)
"Mama Say"	1995	Michael Alperowitz
"Fire Water Burn"	1997	Michael Alperowitz
"Kiss Me Where It Smells Funny"	1997	Michael Alperowitz
"Why's Everybody Always Pickin' on Me?"	1997	Michael Alperowitz, Brian Agnew
"Along Comes Mary"	1999	Michael Alperowitz
"The Bad Touch"	1999	Richard Reines, Stefanie Reines
"The Ballad of Chasey Lain"	2000	Michael Alperowitz
"Mope"	2000	Michael Alperowitz
"Hell Yeah"	2000	Michael Alperowitz
"The Inevitable Return of the Great White Dope"	2001	Michael Alperowitz
"Foxtrot Uniform Charlie Kilo"	2005	Marc Klasfeld, Max Goldman
"Uhn Tiss Uhn Tiss Uhn Tiss"	2005	Michael Alperowitz, Kevin Powers
"Screwing You on the Beach at Night" (Version 1)	2007	Joe Frantz
"Screwing You on the Beach at Night" (Version 2)	2010	
"Altogether Ooky"	2010	Joern Heitmann
