= Show Us Your Hits =

Compilation album by The Bloodhound Gang
- Released: December 21, 2010
- Recorded: 1994–2010
- Genres: Comedy rock, alternative rock
- Length: 59:49
- Label: Geffen
- Producer: Jimmy Pop

The Bloodhound Gang chronology
Hefty Fine (2005)	Show Us Your Hits (2010)	Hard-Off (2015)

Professional ratings
Review scores
Source	Rating
AllMusic	3/5 stars
Spectrum Culture	3.4/5

Show Us Your Hits is a greatest hits compilation album released by American rock band Bloodhound Gang on December 21, 2010. The double entendre in the title is typical of the band's style.

In addition to album tracks, Show Us Your Hits features "Altogether Ooky", and some versions also feature "Screwing You on the Beach at Night" and "Disco Pogo", a song by German duo Die Atzen featuring Jimmy Pop.

Different versions of the album were released in different markets and formats. The US CD version features 12 tracks, the US digital and the European CD version features 14 tracks, the German version features 15 tracks and the European vinyl version features 16 tracks.

In March 2021, the album was released on vinyl, including "My Dad Says That's for Pussies" from Hard-Off and the German bonus track "Disco Pogo".

The name of the model on the cover is Lia May.

== Track listing ==
No.	Title	Original album	Length
1.	"Altogether Ooky"	Non-album single	4:16
2.	"Fire Water Burn"	One Fierce Beer Coaster	4:56
3.	"Along Comes Mary"	Hooray for Boobies	3:32
4.	"Foxtrot Uniform Charlie Kilo"	Hefty Fine	2:55
5.	"The Bad Touch"	Hooray for Boobies	4:25
6.	"No Hard Feelings"	Hefty Fine	5:16
7.	"A Lap Dance Is So Much Better When the Stripper Is Crying"	Hooray for Boobies	5:42
8.	"Kiss Me Where It Smells Funny"	One Fierce Beer Coaster	3:09
9.	"The Ballad of Chasey Lain"	Hooray for Boobies	2:26
10.	"Screwing You On the Beach At Night"	Non-album single	3:44
11.	"Three Point One Four"	Hooray for Boobies	4:00
12.	"You're Pretty When I'm Drunk"	Use Your Fingers	4:01
13.	"Uhn Tiss Uhn Tiss Uhn Tiss"	Hefty Fine	4:24
14.	"I Hope You Die"	Hooray for Boobies	3:47
15.	"My Dad Says That's for Pussies" (Vinyl bonus track)	Hard-Off	2:52
16.	"Disco Pogo (Die Atzen feat. Jimmy Pop)" (German and vinyl bonus track)	Non-album single	3:25

== Charts ==
2010–2011 chart performance for Show Us Your Hits
Chart (2010–2011)	Peak position
German Albums (Offizielle Top 100)	96

2021 chart performance for Show Us Your Hits
Chart (2021)	Peak position
Austrian Albums (Ö3 Austria)	44
Scottish Albums (Official Charts)	61
Swiss Albums (Schweizer Hitparade)	59
UK Album Sales (OCC)	54
UK Physical Albums (OCC)	48
UK Vinyl Albums (OCC)	16

2022 chart performance for Show Us Your Hits
Chart (2022)	Peak position
Belgian Albums (Ultratop Flanders)	71
German Albums (Offizielle Top 100)	10

2025 chart performance for Show Us Your Hits
Chart (2025)	Peak position
Greek Albums (IFPI)	95
