= Mama Say =

Single by Bloodhound Gang

from the album Dingleberry Haze and Use Your Fingers
- Released: May 16, 1995
- Recorded: 1994
- Genre: Hip hop
- Length: 2:59
- Label: Columbia
- Songwriters: Jimmy Pop; Daddy Long Legs; Duran Duran
- Producer: Jimmy Pop

Bloodhound Gang singles chronology
"Mama Say" (1995)	"Fire Water Burn" (1997)

Music video
- "Mama Say" on YouTube

"Mama Say" is the debut single of American rock band Bloodhound Gang. It was originally released as a single from the band's 1994 EP, Dingleberry Haze, but is usually associated with the 1995 album Use Your Fingers. The single features the song remixed by God Lives Underwater.

== Music and lyrics ==
"Mama Say" references children-oriented works and creators like Scooby-Doo, Sesame Street and Judy Blume. Billboard has described the track as having "the goofiest and grooviest sounds of the year".

The song samples Michael Jackson's 1983 single "Wanna Be Startin' Somethin'" in the repeated line "Mama say, mama sa mama cu sa" in its chorus; the title is taken from both this sample and the song "Soul Makossa", which inspired the Jackson tune. Another credited sample is from Duran Duran's "Save a Prayer".

== Track listing ==
CD single

1. "Mama Say" (Original Mess)
2. "Mama Say" (Hip Hop Mix)
3. "Mama Say" (I Didn't Get Paid Sh*t for This Mix)
4. "Mama Say" (Devil's Food Cake Mix)

=== Credits ===
- Bloodhound Gang – production (1)
- Tony D. – production, mixing (2)
- Gary King – engineering (2)
- Jimmy Pop – production (3)
- Jeff Turzo – production (4)

== Music video ==
The music video consists purely of Jimmy Pop and Daddy Long Legs performing in a street for a large crowd. M.S.G. and Skip O'Pot2Mus are shown in a few shots. Lupus Thunder is not shown at all.

== Charts ==
Chart (1995)	Peak position
US Cash Box Top 100	68
