= Rick Denzien =

American singer-songwriter

- Origin: Pennsylvania, United States
- Genres: Rock, pop, AAA Americana music
- Occupation: Singer-songwriter
- Instrument(s): Vocals, acoustic guitar
- Years active: 1990–present
- Labels: Slot-1
- Website: www.rickdenzien.com

Rick Denzien is a songwriter, singer and studio technician from Buffalo, New York.

== Early life ==
Denzien started playing the guitar at eight or nine, reportedly initiated due to a head injury. As a teenager, he performed in the band Freeway. As a third-year high school student, he performed a radio play with fellow musician Bob Schiele. Denzien then moved to Rochester to attend college. He was selected as a recording artist for the State University of New York at Fredonia. He participated in a year-long Tonmeister (recording engineer) program with Eric Paul (record producer) and Richard Hammond. He signed his first publishing contract with a small publisher for his song "Come On Children." The song was listened to in some circles. His first CD was recorded in Nashville at the Oak Ridge Boys studio with his favorite musicians Chad Watson, Randy Corell, Tony Brown (record producer), and J.T. Taylor recording/mix engineer Fred Cameron.

== Career ==
During and after college, Denzien played at various venues in the East and South United States and eventually moved to Philadelphia, Pennsylvania. He recorded his second CD as a limited edition called Heal The Land and included many Philadelphia area musicians. The CD received limited airplay. Two years later, he was asked to help mix The Bloodhound Gang's CD Use Your Fingers for Columbia Records. When Daddy Long Legs broke off from Blood hound gang, he continued to work with the new band called Wolfpac. He recorded and mixed the songs "Somethin' Wicked This Way Comes," "Evil is as Evil Does," and "Death Becomes Her." He is uncredited on the spoken word ad libs for some of these songs. The Band used these recordings to get a slot on the Howard Stern Radio Show.

He has been to The Netherlands four times with live touring performances and has appeared on television and radio shows in the United States, Holland, India, and Australia.

He founded Bah-Fo Studio in 1990 and continues to record and mix for the music community.

== Work ==
=== Discography ===
- Son of the Morning – Rick Denzien
- Heal The Land – Rick Denzien & The Gas House Gorillas
- Laser Writing on the Moon – Rick Denzien & The Gas House Gorillas
- Exit 21 – Rick Denzien
- Recently – Rick Denzien
- Radiate – Rick Denzien
- Green Sky – Rick Denzien
- Blinded Eyes – Rick Denzien

=== Produced ===
CD Albums

- Rick Denzien – Heal The Land Slot-1
- Rick Denzien – Laser Writing on the Moon – Slot-1
- Rick Denzien – Exit 21 – Slot-1
- Michael G. Ronstadt – Foolish Fox – Slot-1
- Lyra Project – Goddess – Slot-1
- C Waitz – Corrupted Youth – Slot-1
- Michael G. Ronstadt – Crazy Rhythm / Empty Drafts – Slot-1
- Bob Mecklenburger – Do It! – Slot-1
- Michael G. Ronstadt – Bridging The Gap – Slot-1
- Kool G Rap – Half A Clip – Latchkey / Kotch
- David Kliener – News That Fit To Sing – indie
- Justin Guarini – What You Won't Do For Love – Slot-1
- Rick Denzien – Recently – Slot-1

Songs

- "Go Out and Play" – Rick Denzien – Slot-1
- "Casual Affairs" – Rick Denzien – Slot-1
- "Radiate" – Rick Denzien – Slot-1
- "What You Won't Do For Love" – Drivetime feat. Justin Guarini – Slot-1
- "The Secret Christmas Song" – Lyra Project – Slot-1
- "Her Calling (America)" – Rick Denzien – Slot-1
- "TSAI (sigh)" – Rick Denzien -Slot-1
- "Ordinary Girl" – Lyra Project – Slot-1
- "Patiently Waits" – Lyra Project – Slot-1
- "Game of Thrones" – Michael G. Ronstadt – Slot-1
- "More" – Rick Denzien – Slot-1
- "Death Looks on You" – Rick Denzien – Slot-1

=== Recording / mix engineer ===
- Rick Denzien – Heal The Land
- Rick Denzien – Laser Writing on the Moon
- Rick Denzien – Exit 21
- Rick Denzien – Recently
- Rick Denzien – Radiate
- Lyra Project – Goddess
- Lyra Project – Walking Together
- Ronstadt Generations – Prelude
- Michael G. Ronstadt – Bridging The Gap
- Craig Bickhardt Live at Sellersville Theater CD Baby
- Michael G. Ronstadt – Crazy Rhythm / Empty Drafts
- Michael G. Ronstadt – Foolish Fox
- Wolfpac – Evil Is...
- Bloodhound Gang – Use Your Fingers
- Kool G Rap – Half a Klip Chinga Chang Latchkey BMG
- C Waitz – Corrupted Youth

Videos

- "God Put a Smile Upon Your Face" – Lyra Project – Goddess] – Slot-1
- "Radiate" – Rick Denzien – Slot-1
- "TSAI (sigh)" – Rick Denzien – Slot-1
- "Grind" – Rick Denzien – Slot-1
- "Busses" – Rick Denzien – Slot-1
- "Tender Mercy" – Jamie Knight – Slot-1
- "Go Out and Play" – Rick Denzien – Slot-1
- "Death Looks on You" – Rick Denzien – Slot-1

Articles

- "Zero emissions musicians take a Tesla Model 3 EV on tour" – TheDriven.IO – Bridie Schmidt
- "Singer Songwriter Plugs Electric Earth Day" – Earth911.com Patti Roth
- "Get Charged Up About Electric Vehicles" – WeaversWay.coop Rick Denzien
- "Radiate" – solismagazine.com Tyler Stansfield Jaggers
- "Go Out and Play" – dropthespotlight.com Vic
- "Emergency Exit" – NewsWeek Magazine New Products

- "Device Helps Safe Escape From A Fire 'Exit Traveler'" – The Morning Call staff

- "Dopple Ganger'" – IMDb Sound Department
