= Hard-Off =

Studio album by Bloodhound Gang
- Released: December 18, 2015
- Recorded: 2006–2015
- Length: 38:31
- Label: Jimmy Franks
- Producer: Jimmy Pop

Bloodhound Gang chronology
Show Us Your Hits (2010)	Hard-Off (2015)

Singles from Hard-Off
- 1. "Chew Toy" Released: August 8, 2014; 2. "American Bitches" Released: December 29, 2014; 3. "Dimes" Released: February 24, 2015; 4. "Clean Up in Aisle Sexy" Released: May 12, 2015; 5. "Uncool as Me" Released: September 4, 2015

Hard-Off is the fifth studio album by American alternative rock band Bloodhound Gang, released on December 18, 2015. It marks the band's first full-length studio release since 2005's Hefty Fine. It is also the group's first full-length studio album featuring ex-A members Daniel P. Carter and Adam Perry, with Carter and Perry having previously performed on various non-album tracks. Between August 8, 2014, and September 3, 2015, five singles were released to promote the album: "Chew Toy", "American Bitches", "Dimes", "Clean Up in Aisle Sexy", and "Uncool as Me".

The album was released on CD, vinyl, and digital download via bandleader Jimmy Pop's label Jimmy Franks Recording Company. It is available for sale only via the Bloodhound Gang website.

The album had been planned for release at various dates under the title Getting Laid on a School Bus, which would have included the two tracks "Altogether Ooky" and "Screwing You on the Beach at Night" that the band had released as non-album singles. There were also rumors that the record would be called Fishin' for Hookers.

== History ==
On October 22, 2007, the Bloodhound Gang released a single called "Screwing You on the Beach at Night", which was accompanied by a video based on the one for Chris Isaak's 1990 single "Wicked Game". The group played a few shows in the UK and appeared on German TV to promote it.

In October 2008, Lupus Thunder quit the band; this was announced in a blog post on the band's MySpace by bassist Evil Jared. Daniel P. Carter from A replaced Lupus as the lead guitarist. Carter has since stylized his name as Denial P. Cartier when performing with the band.

Jimmy Pop announced during a radio interview in Boston that the band was working on a new album that would feature around 10–12 songs. Many news agencies reported that the name of the album would be Getting Laid on a School Bus with a likely release date of 2012. On December 4, Jimmy Pop announced that he "just narrowed 25–30 demos down to 10–12 to finish".

In late 2010, the band released a new song called "Altogether Ooky". The music video is on YouTube. On March 31, Jimmy Pop confirmed via Twitter that the band was currently working on the album, but it would not be called Getting Laid on a School Bus and would instead be titled Fishin' for Hookers.

At a Bloodhound Gang concert in the Netherlands in 2013, the group joked that they would release the album "by the time the North-South Line is completed."

Between 2014 and 2015, the group released "American Bitches", "Chew Toy", "Dimes", "Clean Up in Aisle Sexy", and "Uncool as Me" as singles. On March 26, 2021, "My Dad Says That's for Pussies" was included as a bonus track on the vinyl re-release of the band's best-of album Show Us Your Hits.

== Critical response ==
Professional ratings
Review scores
Source	Rating
Heavy Pop	3/10
laut.de	2/5 stars
Mondo Sonoro	6/10
Ultimate Guitar	3.3/10

Hard-Off has received mixed reviews, with many critics divided by its musical direction and lyrical content.

Laura Jaime of KRUI-FM stated that the "beats make you want to bop along to but the lyrics make you cringe." However, Ricky Frankel of Punknews.org stated that "while the lyrics are definitely on par with their past releases, the Bloodhound Gang seem to have mellowed quite a bit in sound with this new release."

== Track listing ==
All tracks are written by James Franks, except where noted.

No.	Title	Length
1.	"My Dad Says That's for Pussies" (Franks, Jared Hennegan)	2:52
2.	"Dimes"	4:27
3.	"American Bitches"	3:46
4.	"Chew Toy"	3:15
5.	"Uncool as Me" (feat. Joey Fatone)	3:40
6.	"Clean Up in Aisle Sexy"	2:52
7.	"Diary of a Stranger"	3:46
8.	"Socially Awkward Penguin" (Daniel P. Carter, Franks)	3:17
9.	"Think Outside the Box"	4:16
10.	"We're Gonna Bring the Party to You" (Harry Dean, Franks)	5:00
11.	"Bumblebees"	1:20
Total length:		38:31

- "Bumblebees" ends at 0:15. Following 45 seconds of silence, a hidden track (running 20 seconds) plays, featuring Jimmy Pop telling the listener to pick a number between 1 and 10. After the listener picks 7, Jimmy warns the listener not to change their answer.

== Personnel ==
Band members

- Jimmy Pop – lead vocals, rhythm guitar, samples, production
- Denial P. Cartier – lead guitar
- The Yin – drums
- Evil Jared – bass
- DJ Q-Ball – turntables, keys, programming
