= Dingleberry Haze =

EP by The Bloodhound Gang
- Released: November 20, 1994
- Recorded: 1992–1994
- Length: 21:22
- Label: Cheese Factory
- Producers: Jimmy Pop Ali, Daddy Long Legs and Grover

The Bloodhound Gang chronology
The Original Motion Picture Soundtrack to Hitler's Handicapped Helpers (1994)	Dingleberry Haze (1994)	Use Your Fingers (1995)

Dingleberry Haze is the first EP by American rock band the Bloodhound Gang, released in November 1994 on Cheese Factory Records.

Though there are not too many differences between this EP and their next release, Use Your Fingers, there are a few. The major difference is in the track "Coo Coo Ca Choo" which uses a sample from Cream's "Sunshine of Your Love", rather than the heavy guitar riff-laden version that appears on Use Your Fingers.

This CD was written by Jimmy Pop and Daddy Long Legs who is now in the group Wolfpac.

== Track listing ==
All songs written by Daddy Long Legs and Jimmy Pop.

1. "Go Down" – 2:23
2. "Cheese Tidbit" – 0:44
3. "Legend in My Spare Time" – 3:08
4. "Neighbour Invasion" – 0:07
5. "Mama Say" – 3:02
6. "Rang Dang" – 3:04
7. "Earlameyer the Butt Pirate" – 0:06
8. "One Way" – 3:07
9. "Shitty Record Offer" – 0:51
10. "Coo Coo Ca Choo" – 2:40
11. "Live at the Apollo" – 2:10

=== Unreleased tracks ===
The group was planning on putting more tracks on this EP, but it has been said that they decided against it due to time constraints. Some of these tracks have been released on the band's first album Use Your Fingers, although they were re-recorded.

- "Convoy"
- "Hokie Pokie" (this track was leaked onto the internet in 2011)
- "Ornamental Groove in Floopoid Zee" (one of the band's earliest songs)
- "No Rest for the Wicked"
- "We Are the Knuckleheads"
- "She Ain't Got No Legs"

Alternative versions of a few of the songs on this EP are also circulating among fans.

== Personnel ==
- Engineer – Bill Fitch, D.J. Mizz, Michael Harmon, Richie Gaglia
- Executive Producer – Cousin Mike
- Mastered By – Gene Paul
- Other [Cover Model] – Grover
- Performer –

Daddy Long Legs Vocals, Bass Jimmy Pop Vocals, Guitar Bubba K. Love Turntables Foof Drums M.S.G Turntables Skip O-Pot 2 Mus Drums Lazy I Backing Vocals White Steve Backing Vocals II

- Photography – Nicole Shore
- Written-By – Daddy Long Legs, Jimmy Pop
