= Ramesses Nightingale =

American professional wrestler (born 1975)

- Born: 1975 (age 49–50); Modesto, California, US
- Other names: Leatherface,
- Years active: 1997–present
- Known for: Internet videos & TV shows
- Notable work: "Viva La Bam, Junkie"
- Website: instagram.com/imaleatherface

Ramesses "Leatherface" Nightingale (born 1975) is a professional wrestler and actor. In his early years, his work included acting roles in Dr. Quinn Medicine Woman and Walt Disney's Under Wraps. He gained a high level of popularity after his appearance on Viva La Bam Season 2, Episode 7 "Tree Top Casino". He has also appeared in music videos such as Bloodhound Gang's "Uhn Tiss Uhn Tiss Uhn Tiss" and Papa Roach's "...To Be Loved". His most current work is feature film Miles to Go (2018) where he plays a brutal killer, with fellow actors Christian Kane and James Duval.

== Movies/TV ==
- Smosh "Ultimate Assassin's Creed 3 video"-2013
- The N Word "Short Film" as Little Man- 2017
- Monster Quest~ As Leatherface -2009 History Channel
- Howard Stern TV~ Fart Olympics- Accompanied -2006
- Junkie "Feature Film" as Carl Banks- 2018
- Viva La Bam~ As Leatherface -2004 MTV
- Dr. Quinn, Medicine Woman~ Extra -1999 GMC
- Walt Disney's Under Wraps~ Extra -1997
- Off The Hook Television Series~ As Leatherface -2005/2006/2007/2009 TVN

== Radio ==
- Sirius Satellite Radio Jason Ellis radio show~ Appearance -2006
- Sirius Satellite Radio Playboy Radio~ AVN Interview -2006
- Howard Stern TV~ Fart Olympics- Accompanied -2006
- The Dirty Twig Show~ Co Host -2008/2009 Syndicate Radio

== Music videos ==
- Smosh Music video "Ultimate Assassins Creed 3 Video" -2013
- "...To Be Loved" by Papa Roach~ As Leatherface -2006 Geffen Records
- "Uhn Tiss Uhn Tiss Uhn Tiss" by Bloodhound Gang~ As Leatherface -2005 Geffen Records
