= Erotixxx Award =

German pornographic film awards

Erotixxx Awards
- Sponsored by: eroFame
- Location: Berlin (2005–2009); Potsdam (2010); Hanover (since 2011)
- Country: Germany
- First award: 23 October 2005

Highlights
- Most awards: Jana Bach; Vivian Schmitt (5 awards each)

The Erotixxx Award (eLine Award or Eroticline Award until 2008) is a film award in the adult film industry presented by German magazine eLine (established as EAN). Between 2005 and 2009, the award was presented yearly as part of the Venus Berlin trade fair, an international trade festival of the erotic. The Erotixxx Award was the successor to the Venus Award, which had been presented until 2004 and then resumed in 2010. Starting in 2010, the Erotixxx Award became a part of the erotic fair eroFame in Hannover and, since 2011, it has only awarded innovative products, toys, and companies. During the Venus Berlin years, prizewinners were chosen by a jury and by a ballot of webmasters or registered users of several German erotic websites. Since that time, they have been chosen by the editorial staff of eLine and EAN.

== 2005 Prizewinners ==
- Best Film International - Robinson Crusoe (Private/VPS)
- Best Film (Germany) - Der Boss
- Best Gay Film - Rising Sun
- Best Series - Straßenflirts (Street Flirts)
- Best Director International - Mario Salieri
- Best Director (Germany) - John Thompson
- Best Gay Actor - Cameron Jackson
- Best Erotic Actress in the World - Savanna Samson
- Best Actress (Europe) - Renee Pornero
- Best Actress (Germany) - Vivian Schmitt
- Best Actor International - Rocco Siffredi
- Best Actor (Germany) - Tobi Toxic
- Best Newcomer (Germany) - Jana Bach
- Best International Newcomer - Brigitta Bulgari

== 2006 Prizewinners ==
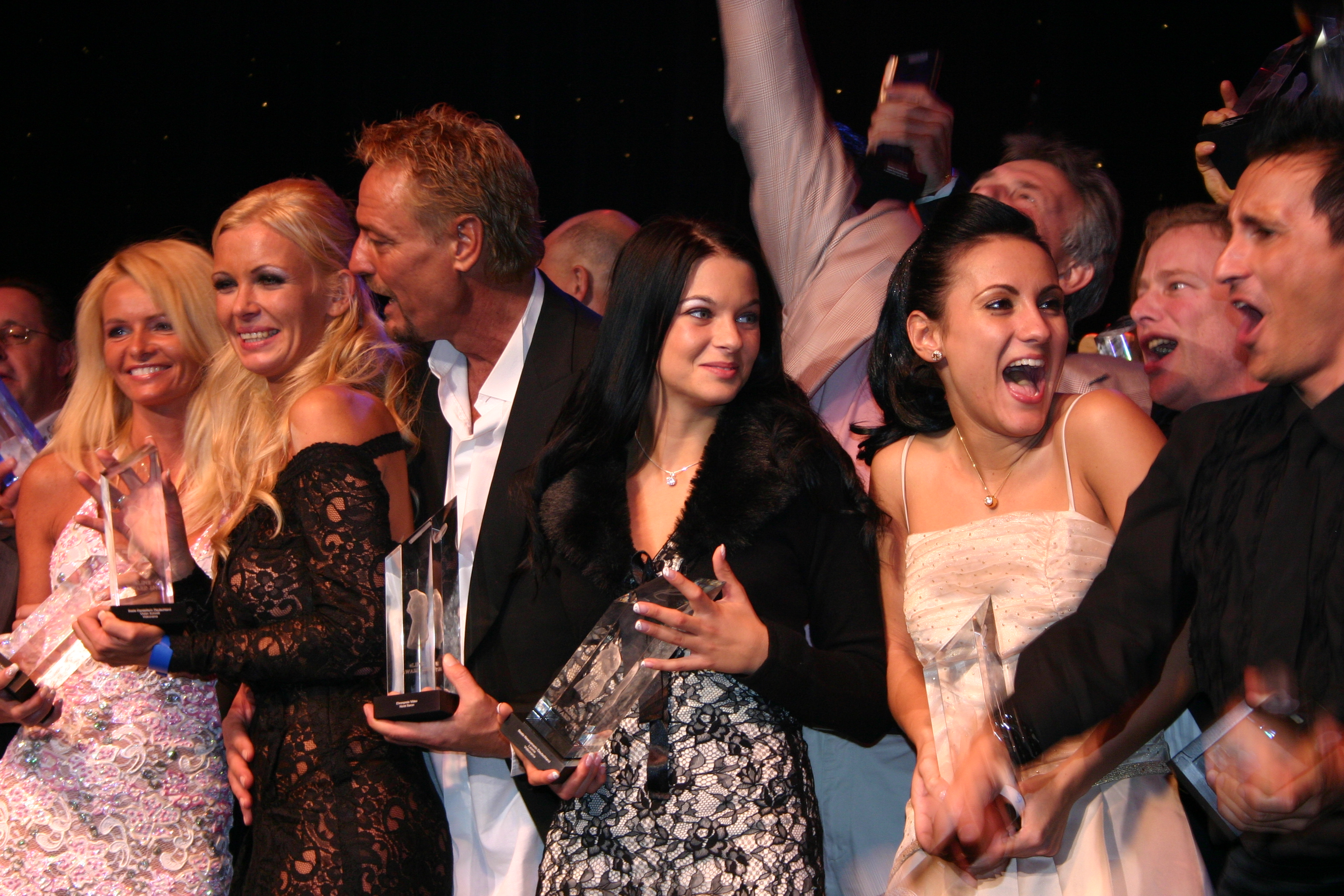
Several winners of the 2006 EroticLine Awards. Starting from left: Nicoletta Blue, Vivian Schmitt, Horst Baron, Leonie Saint, Poppy Morgan and Conny Dachs.

- Best Adult Portal - www.fundorado.de (Fundorado)
- Best Innovative Online Product - www.privateonly.com (Cupido AG)
- Best Live Production - www.6-chats.com (Intermax)
- Special Award 2006 - Jvo Ganz (Swiss Business) & Ralf Dormann
- Best Cover - Venus Hill (erotic planet)
- Best Director International Websites - Tom Byron (Shots Video)
- Best Director Germany - Nils Molitor (Magma Film)
- Best Gonzo Label - 21sextury (MEE)
- Best Fetish Label - Bizarre Europe (Sunset Media)
- Best Newcomer Label - Africa Extreme (VPS)
- Best Newcomer Label International - girls mouth (John Thomson/MEE)
- Best Series Germany - Popp oder Hopp (Inflagranti)
- Best Film International - Sex City (Private/VPS)
- Best Film Germany - String Tanga (or Thong) (MMV)
- Best Actor International - Tommy Gunn (Vivid)
- Best Actor Germany - Conny Dachs (Magma Film)
- Best Newcomer International - Roberta Missoni (Goldlight)
- Best Actress International Websites - Poppy Morgan (a2z)
- Best Actress USA - Jessica Drake (Wicked/Paradise Film)
- Best Newcomer Germany - Leonie (Videorama)
- Best Actress Germany - Jana Bach (Inflagranti) & Vivian Schmitt (Videorama)
- Best Innovative Product - Eros Explorer (Megasol)
- Dealer of the Year - Werner Berndt (MMG)
- Best Sales - Videorama
- Best Newcomer Company - erotic planet
- Company of the Year - Magma Film

== 2007 Prizewinners ==
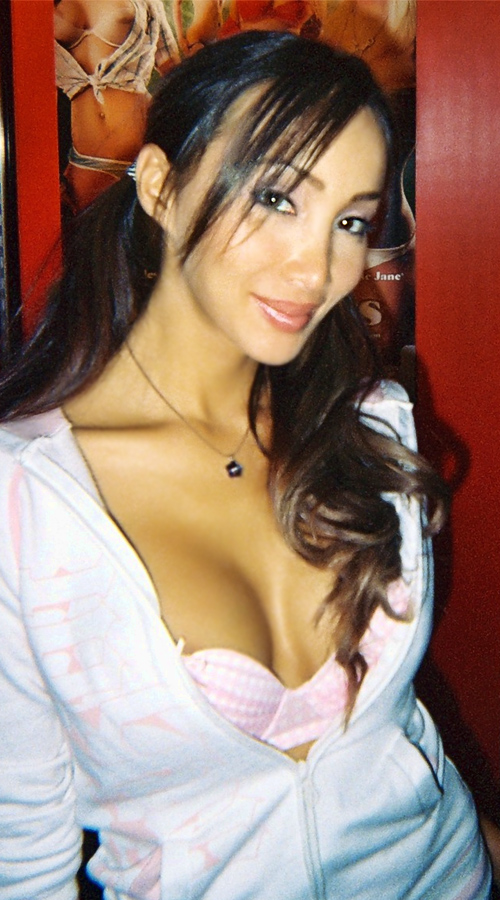
Katsuni at the 2007 Venus Fair

- Best European Film - The Sexual Adventures of Little Red (Private - Louis Moire/Max Candy)
- Best High-Budget Film - Xcalibur (Woodman Entertainment)
- Best Adult Film for Women - Five hot stories for her (Thagson)
- Best German Film - Cabaret (Magmafilm)
- Best German Series - Kommst Du Mit? (INO GmbH)
- Best International Series - Ass Drippers (Paradise Film)
- Best Gonzo Series: Max Hardcore – Shots Media
- Best International Lesbian Series - Lesbian Seria (Media Entertainment Establishment Ehrenpreis)
- Best German Fetish Label - Black Line (Inflagranti Film Berlin)
- Best International Fetish Label - Fetish Deluxe (Daring)
- Best German Newcomer Label - Ti Amorz (Goldlight)
- Best International Direction - Hervé Bodilis (Marc Dorcel)
- Best Direction Germany - Nils Molitor (Magmafilm)
- Best Actress USA - Jesse Jane (Digital Playground)
- Best Actress Germany - Leonie (Videorama)
- Best European Actress - Yasmine (Marc Dorcel)
- Best German Actor - Carlo Minaldi (Magmafilm)
- Best International Actor - Greg Centauro (Paradise Film)
- Best German Newcomer - Mandy Blue (SD Evolution)
- Best International Newcomer - Carmen Hart (Wicked Pictures)
- Successful Performing Businesswoman of the Year USA - Tera Patrick (Teravision)
- Successful Performing Businesswoman of the Year Europe - Salma De Nora
- Best Interactive Film: InTERActive (Teravision/Hustler Europe)
- Best International Newcomer Label - Jules Jordan Video - Playhouse
- European Adult Lifestyle Award - Larry Flynt
- Best U.S. Film - Debbie Does Dallas... Again (Vivid Entertainment)
- Best Amateur Label - Homegrown Video - Pure Play Media
- Best U.S. Newcomer Label - Swank Digital - Pure Play Media
- Best Cover - Lady Scarface (Adam & Eve Pictures/Little Hollywood)
- Best R-Rated/Adult Film - Black Worm (Pulpo/Media Entertainment Establishment)
- Best Adult Classics - Herzog Video
- Best Manga Series - Trimax
- Best R-Rated Erotic Film - Sexuelle Disziplinierung (Orion)
- Best Niche Label - Robert Hill Releasing – Shots Media
- Video Award for Outstanding Achievements - Video: Harry S. Morgan
- Award for Dedication to the Industry - Vivian Schmitt (Videorama)
- Award for Outstanding Achievements - Roberta Missoni
- Best Sex-TV Host - Jana Bach (Inflagranti Film Berlin) & Conny Dax (Beate Uhse TV)
- Best Live Performance - Vivian Schmitt

== 2008 Prizewinners ==
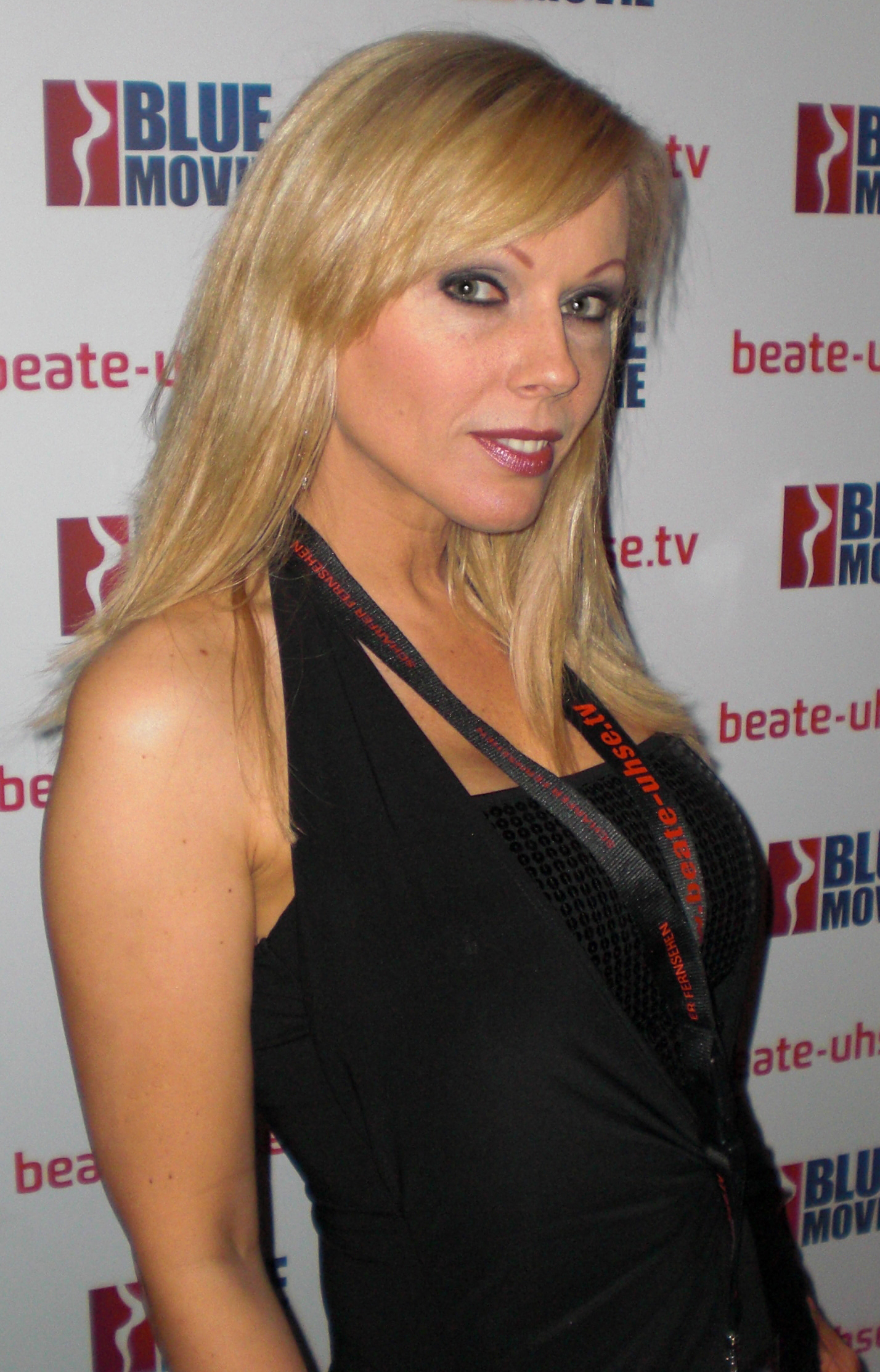
Kelly Trump at the Venus Fair, October 2008

Winners are as follows:

- Best U.S. Film - Cry Wolf (Vivid/Paul Thomas)
- Best Feature Film USA - Roller Dollz (Adam & Eve/Zero Tolerance)
- Film with Highest Potential - Pirates II: Stagnetti's Revenge (Digital Playground)
- Best European Film - Casino: No Limit (Marc Dorcel)
- Best Big-Budget Film - Casino: No Limit (Marc Dorcel)
- Best European Director - Hervé Bodilis (Casino: No Limit)
- Best European Actress - Yasmine (Marc Dorcel)
- Special Award for Outstanding Achievements - Marc Dorcel & Jessica Drake
- Best U.S. Series - Barely Legal (Hustler Video)
- Business Woman of the Year - Theresa Flynt (Hustler)
- Best Gonzo Label - Jules Jordan Video
- Best International Newcomer Label - Cruel Media
- Label of the Year - Daring Media
- Best U.S. Fetish Label - HellHouse Media (Pure Play Media)
- Best U.S. Actress - Jesse Jane (Digital Playground)
- Best U.S. Newcomer - Stoya (Digital Playground)
- Best U.S. Director - Robby D. (Digital Playground)
- Best International Actor - Randy Spears (Wicked Pictures)
- Best Lingerie Label - Mistress Couture (Tera Patrick)
- Best Erotic TV Channel - Beate Uhse TV
- Best Internet TV Channel - PINK'O TV
- Best Softcore Site - Flirtpub.de
- Company of the Year (Film) - INO GmbH (Germany)
- Company of the Year (Toys & Consumables) - Scala
- Most Innovative Product 2008 - We-Vibe
- Best Toy Collection (Germany) - Mae B. Toys (Beate Uhse AG)
- Best Toy Collection (International) - Evolved Novelties
- Product of the Year - SEXERCISEME
- Best Cover - Sexclusive (Sexsense/MEA)
- Best Niche Product - Robert Hill Releasing
- Best Blu-ray Title - Cabaret Berlin (Magma Film)
- Best Feature Film (Europe) - Dogs World (Thagson)
- Award for Pioneering Achievements in Adult Films for Women - Petra Joy
- Best Documentary - Lust Films Barcelona
- Best Direction (Fetish) - Master Costello
- Best German Director - Karl Berg (INO GmbH)
- Best German Gay Film - Office Sluts (Berlin Star Film)
- Best International Gay Film - UK Council Lads (LoadXXX)
- Best German Fetish Label - Paraphilia (Paradise Film)
- Best European Fetish Label - Girlpower (Sunset Media)
- Best European Newcomer Label - Sexsense (MEA)
- Best German Series - Die Luders (Goldlight Filmproduction)
- Best European Series - Virtual Sex with... (Playhouse)
- Best German Film - Heavy Dreams – Küche, Kiste, Bett (Inflagranti)
- Best Amateur Newcomer - Jüksel D.
- Best Crossover Star (Germany) - Jana Bach
- Best Crossover Star (International) - Roberta
- Best Series Actress - Alexa Bold (INO GmbH)
- Best Fetish Actress - Mistress Gemini (Sunset Media)
- Most Comical Adult TV Entertainer - J.P. Love
- Best German Newcomer - Annina (Magmafilm/Blue Movie)
- Best European Newcomer - Greta Martini (Goldlight Filmproduction)
- Best German Actress - Tyra Misoux (Magmafilm)
- Best German Actor - Greg Centauro (Paradise Film)

== 2009 Prizewinners ==
- Best European Film - Ritual (Marc Dorcel)
- Best National b2c Erotic Print Magazine - Happy Weekend
- Best National Erotic-TV Channel - HUSTLER TV Deutschland
- Best International Erotic-TV Channel - Dorcel TV
- Best Adult Website - fundorado.com
- Retailer of the Year (Toys & Consumables) - Nice 'n' Naughty
- Company of the Year – Film/Europe - eroticplanet
- Company of the Year – Film/USA - Zero Tolerance
- Company of the Year (Toys & Consumables) - Scala/Playhouse
- Best Line of Products International - Shunga (Eau Zone)
- Best Lingerie Label - Red Corner by Cotelli Collection (ORION)
- Best Fashion Label - Hustler Fashion
- Best Newcomer Consumables - Geisha Bodycare (Scala/Playhouse)
- Bestseller of the Year - We-Vibe
- Most Innovative Product 2009 - Touché Ice (Shots Media)
- Best Overall Collection - Scala/Playhouse
- Best European Director - Hervé Bodilis (Marc Dorcel)
- Best U.S. Director - Joone (Digital Playground)
- Best German Fetish Label - Inflagranti
- Best International Fetish Label - Girlpower (Sunset Media)
- Best German Newcomer Series - Mitten in Deutschland (Goldlight Film)
- Best Newcomer Gay-Label - Skater-Boyz (Stoll Media/XY Distribution)
- Best Gonzo-Label - Cruel Media (VPS Erotic Division)
- Best European Label 2009 - Daring! (Scala/Playhouse)
- Best International Label 2009 - Bizarre Brothers (Marlis Baukloh)
- Best German Series - Nachbarin Gerda (Videorama)
- Best International Series - This Ain't… (Hustler)
- Best Amateur Series Germany - Traut Euch (Muschi Movie/INO GmbH)
- Best Amateur Series International - Real Punting (LoadXXX)
- Best Reality Series - Dominiques Fuck Akademie (Magmafilm)
- Best German Film - Black and White 4U (Paradise Film)
- Best Feature Film - Die Waffen einer Frau (Goldlight Film)
- Best U.S. Film - Pirates II (Digital Playground)
- Best Gay Film - Trained To Obey (A2Z-Distribution)
- Best Gay Series 2009 - Triga (LoadXXX)
- Best Actor - Porn Fighter Long John
- Best Series Actress - Vanessa Jordin (Muschi Movie)
- Best Cross-Over-Star 2009 - Maria Mia
- Best German Newcomer - Jasmine la Rouge (eroticplanet)
- Best International Newcomer - Janine Rose (Muschi Movie)
- Best German Actress - Vivian Schmitt (Videorama)
- Best European Actress - Tarra White (Marc Dorcel)
- Best International Actress - Mandy Bright (eroticplanet)
- Rising Star 2009 - Wanita Tan (Magmafilm)
- Pornstar of the Year 2009 - Jana Bach (Inflagranti)
