= Mischief Night (disambiguation) =

Mischief Night refers to an informal holiday on which children and teens engage in pranks and minor vandalism.

Mischief Night may also refer to:

- Mischief Night (2006 film), a British comedy-drama film starring Kelli Hollis
- Mischief Night (2013 film), a horror/thriller film by Richard Schenkman
- Mischief Night (2014 film), an American slasher film by Travis Baker
- As Night Comes or Mischief Night, a 2014 film
- "Mischief Night", a song by Wolfpac from Evil Is...
