= Leonie Saint =

German actress and TV presenter

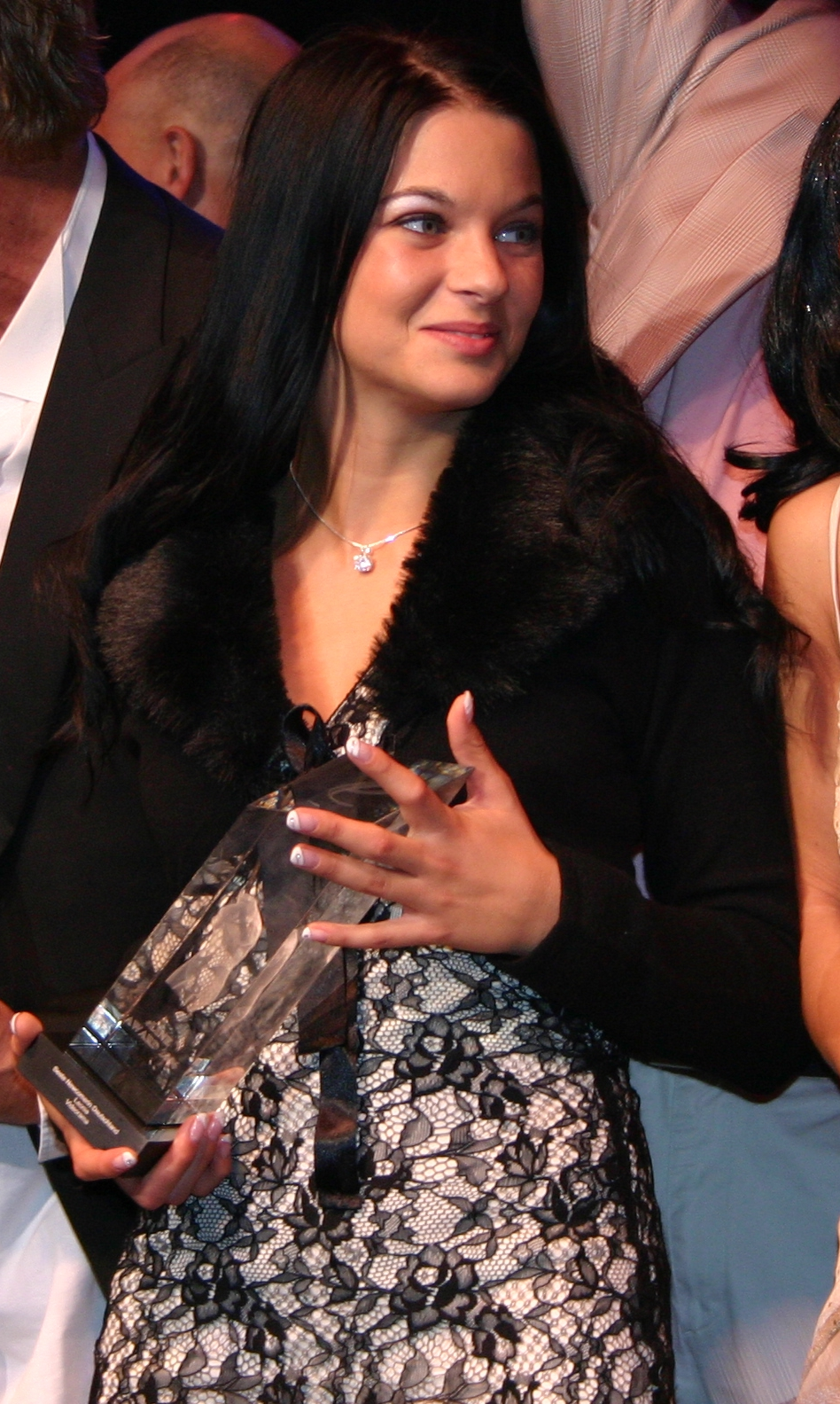
- Saint wins the 2006 Best Newcomer Germany eLine Award.
- Born: 23 April 1986 (age 40); Herne, North Rhine-Westphalia, West Germany
- Occupations: Actress; adult actress; TV hostess

Leonie Saint (born 23 April 1986), also known with the stage names Leonie Luder or simply Leonie, is a German actress, TV presenter and former pornographic actress.

== Life and career ==
Born on 23 April 1986 in Herne, North Rhine-Westphalia, Leonie entered the adult industry in September 2005, at the age of 19 years. In 2006, she became an exclusive actress for the company Videorama, for which she made her own series called Leonie. That same year, Leonie won the eLine Award in the category "Best Newcomer Germany" and, in 2007, in the category "Best Actress Germany".

Between 2007 and 2009, she co-hosted the show La Notte on the quiz channel 9Live. In 2007, she appeared in the music video "Lover's Lane" for the German horror punk band The Other. That same year, she also appeared in the music video "Screwing You on the Beach at Night" by Bloodhound Gang, but the video was eventually released in 2010.

In January 2008, Saint announced her retirement from the adult industry. In a 2011 interview, she said that she was disillusioned with the porn industry, that she would not do it again, and that she believed to have been deliberately infected with chlamydia by a jealous colleague.

Saint played a minor role in the 2009 film Männersache, directed by Mario Barth; she had previously been the leading actress and main subject of an eponym 2007 short film, Leonie Saint, directed by Jana Debus and showed at the 53rd International Short Film Festival Oberhausen. Saint also hosted the program Sportquiz on the channel Sport1.

== Personal life ==
In 2009, Saint had a daughter, Joline. In 2012, she married Marc, the father of her daughter.
