= Foxtrot Uniform Charlie Kilo =

2005 single by Bloodhound Gang

Single by Bloodhound Gang

from the album Hefty Fine
- Released: August 1, 2005
- Length: 2:51
- Label: Geffen; Republic; Jimmy Franks
- Songwriters: Jared Hasselhoff; Jimmy Pop
- Producer: Jimmy Pop

Bloodhound Gang singles chronology
"The Inevitable Return of the Great White Dope" (2000)	"Foxtrot Uniform Charlie Kilo" (2005)	"Uhn Tiss Uhn Tiss Uhn Tiss" (2005)

Music video
- "Foxtrot Uniform Charlie Kilo" on YouTube

"Foxtrot Uniform Charlie Kilo" is a song by American alternative rock band Bloodhound Gang. It was released as the lead single from their fourth studio album, Hefty Fine (2005), on August 1, 2005. The song was written by band members Jimmy Pop and Jared Hasselhoff. The title "Foxtrot Uniform Charlie Kilo" spells out fuck in the NATO phonetic alphabet. The song's lyrics consist of various sexual euphemisms.

== Music video ==
The music video for "Foxtrot Uniform Charlie Kilo" was directed by Marc Klasfeld. It shows Bam Margera, a friend of the band, driving down a Pennsylvania highway in the "Banana Car" (which was seen in the band's MTV Cribs). While he is driving, Margera sees some girls performing sexually suggestive activities in wet bikinis, poking fun at Benny Benassi's controversial "Satisfaction" video, while the band performs in a tunnel. The girls are wearing hard hats with the Pennsylvania National Guard insignia.

When Margera drives the banana-mobile up to the tunnel (whose entrance is topped by a wild grapevine growing in the shape of trimmed female pubic hair), he proceeds to gaze, enthralled at it, then drives through it, passing the band members in the process. The tunnel used in the video is the abandoned Rays Hill Tunnel on a 12-mile stretch of abandoned Pennsylvania Turnpike east of Breezewood. The video ends with Margera giving a banana to a man in a Speedo who consumes it in a manner that mimics fellatio. The video also begins with Mark the Bagger saying "Fish don't fry in the kitchen".

== Charts ==
=== Weekly charts ===
Weekly chart performance for "Foxtrot Uniform Charlie Kilo"
Chart (2005–2006)	Peak position
Australia (ARIA)	25
Austria (Ö3 Austria Top 40)	10
Czech Republic (Radio Top 100)	41
Denmark (Tracklisten)	13
Finland (Suomen virallinen lista)	18
Germany (GfK)	15
Netherlands (Single Top 100)	90
Russia Airplay (TopHit)	198
Scotland Singles (OCC)	45
Switzerland (Schweizer Hitparade)	47
UK Singles (OCC)	47

=== Year-end charts ===
Year-end chart performance for "Foxtrot Uniform Charlie Kilo"
Chart (2005)	Position
Austria (Ö3 Austria Top 40)	70
Germany (Media Control GfK)	91

== Release history ==
Release dates and formats for "Foxtrot Uniform Charlie Kilo"
Region	Date	Format(s)	Label(s)	Ref.
United States	August 1, 2005	Alternative radio	Geffen; Republic; Jimmy Franks	
Australia	September 19, 2005	CD	Geffen; Republic; Jimmy Franks	
United Kingdom	September 19, 2005	CD	Geffen; Republic; Jimmy Franks	
