= Use Your Fingers =

Studio album by The Bloodhound Gang
- Released: July 18, 1995
- Recorded: 1992–1995
- Genres: Comedy rock, hip hop, punk rock
- Length: 40:55
- Labels: Cheese Factory, Columbia, Underdog
- Producers: Jimmy Pop and Daddy Long Legs

The Bloodhound Gang chronology
Dingleberry Haze (1994)	Use Your Fingers (1995)	One Fierce Beer Coaster (1996)

Singles from Use Your Fingers
- 1. "Mama Say" Released: May 16, 1995; 2. "K.I.D.S. Incorporated" Released: 1995

Use Your Fingers is the debut studio album by Bloodhound Gang. It was released on July 18, 1995, by Cheese Factory Records. Some of the songs on the album were reworked version of demos from Bloodhound Gang's earlier demo tapes. The album has sold 250,000 copies to date.

== Reception ==
Professional ratings
Review scores
Source	Rating
AllMusic	2.5/5 stars
Muzik	2.5/5 stars
The Rolling Stone Album Guide	2.5/5 stars

On August 7, 2015, OC Weekly published a 20-year anniversary write-up of the album, stating "what makes Use Your Fingers worthy of re-examining two decades later is how much this album not only shouldn't exist from a legal perspective, but how it managed to predict so much of the 20 years of musical trends that followed it," and praising it as a "unique entry in the hip-hop canon from a sampling production standpoint, an impressive assortment of acknowledgments from a pop culture junkie standpoint, and overall one of the rare albums whose sheer existence is just as bizarre as the music it contains."

== Track listing ==
All songs written and composed by Jimmy Pop and Daddy Long Legs unless noted. "Legend in My Spare Time" contains an interpolation of "Too Shy", written by Steve Askew, Nick Beggs, Stuart Neale, Jez Strode and Christopher Hamill.

1. "Rip Taylor Is God" – 1:23 (featuring Rip Taylor)
2. "We Are the Knuckleheads" – 2:39
3. "Legend in My Spare Time" – 3:05
4. "B.H.G.P.S.A." – 0:22
5. "Mama Say" (Pop, Legs, Duran Duran) – 2:59
6. "Kids in America" (Wilde, Wilde) – 4:23 (cover of Kim Wilde's 1981 hit)
7. "You're Pretty When I'm Drunk" – 3:56
8. "The Evils of Placenta Hustling" – 0:19
9. "One Way" (Bloodhound Gang) – 3:05
10. "Shitty Record Offer" – 0:58
11. "Go Down" – 2:26
12. "Earlameyer the Butt Pirate" – 0:11
13. "No Rest for the Wicked" – 2:50
14. "She Ain't Got No Legs" – 2:28
15. "We Like Meat" – 0:04
16. "Coo Coo Ca Choo" – 2:36
17. "Rang Dang" (Pop, Legs, Glover, Robinson) – 3:02
18. "Nightmare at the Apollo" – 0:56
19. "K.I.D.S. Incorporated" – 2:20 (TV series theme song cover)
20. "Bloodhound Sex Scene" – 0:47

== Credits ==
Bloodhound Gang

- Jimmy Pop - lead vocals, rhythm guitar, production
- Daddy Long Legs - lead vocals, bass, production
- Skip O' Pot2Mus - drums, backing vocals
- M.S.G. - turntables, backing vocals
- Lüpüs Thünder - lead guitar, backing vocals

Additional musicians

- Rip Taylor - spoken word on "Rip Taylor Is God"
- Kyle Seifert - drums on "Kids in America"
- Rob Vitale - vocals on "Kids in America"
- Keith O'Quinn - trombone on "She Ain't Got No Legs"
- Joe Shepley - trumpet on "She Ain't Got No Legs"
- Kenny Venezia - tenor sax on "She Ain't Got No Legs"
- Michael 'Spanky G' Guthier - drums on "K.I.D.S. Incorporated"
- J.J. Bottari - engineering on "Mama Say"
- Richie Gagliadotto - engineering on "Go Down" and "Shitty Record Offer"
- Rick Denzien - mix engineer on "Rang Dang", "We Are the Knuckleheads" and "No Rest for the Wicked"
- Chris Interrante, Steve Sikora - assistant engineers to Rick Denzien
- Jim Janik - engineering on "She Ain't Got No Legs"
- Robert Friedrich, Troy Halderson - assistant engineers to Jim Janik

Personnel

- Tom Ruff - mastering on "Use Your Fingers"
- Aimée Macauley - art direction and design
- Ari Marcopoulos - photography
- Christopher Bisagni - photograph of Nicole Brier
- Jed Corenthal, Gerard Babbits - product managers
