= Jana Bach =

German pornographic actress, model, and television host

- Born: 10 April 1979 (age 47); Eisleben, East Germany (now Germany)
- Occupations: Pornographic actress; model; television host
- Years active: 2004–present
- Notable work: Sex & Lügen, Jana von 0 auf 100, Rocker Queens

Jana Bach (born 10 April 1979) is a German pornographic actress, model, and television host.

== Adult career ==
Jana Bach began modeling for the erotic magazine Coupé in 2004, and entered the adult film industry at the German Venus Festival. She has appeared in more than thirty adult films since 2005 (see below), primarily for the Berlin-based Inflagranti-Film label.

Bach participated in a topless women's football match between Austria and Germany as goalkeeper for the Germans. She was quoted, "I was supposed to hold the balls but I really have no idea how to do that".

== Awards ==
- 2005 Eroticline Award – Best German Newcomer
- 2006 Eroticline Award – Best Actress (Germany)
- 2007 Eroticline Award – Best Sex-TV Host
- 2008 Eroticline Award – Best Crossover Star (Germany)
- 2009 Eroticline Award – Pornstar of the Year

== Partial filmography ==
- 2005:
  - Sex & Lügen
  - Jana von 0 auf 100
  - Rocker Queens
  - Popp oder Hopp – Das Live-Sex-Spiel No. 10
  - Fetish-Zone: Fußorgasmen
  - Schwarze Flamme Silverline: Landzucht
  - Stahlhart: Gefangene der Lust
- 2006:
  - Janas Sex-Fantasien
  - Die Jana Bach Show
  - Jana Bach: Schlaflos in Berlin
  - Best of Jana Bach
  - Zicken... jetzt seid ihr fällig! Folge 5
- 2007:
  - Jana Bach, Der Star hautnah
  - Jana Bach, Living Hardcore
  - Stars & Strips & Sexintrigen
- 2008:
  - SexParadies
  - Love & Sex – The Parade 2008
