= EroFame =

Trade convention for erotic products

eroFame is an international B2B trade convention for erotic products, attracting nearly 200 national and international exhibitors to its 2013 event. eroFame exhibitors sell products such as adult toys, erotic accessories and lingerie, rather than products associated with hardcore pornography.

Since 2010, eroFame has also hosted the annual EROTIX AWARDs.

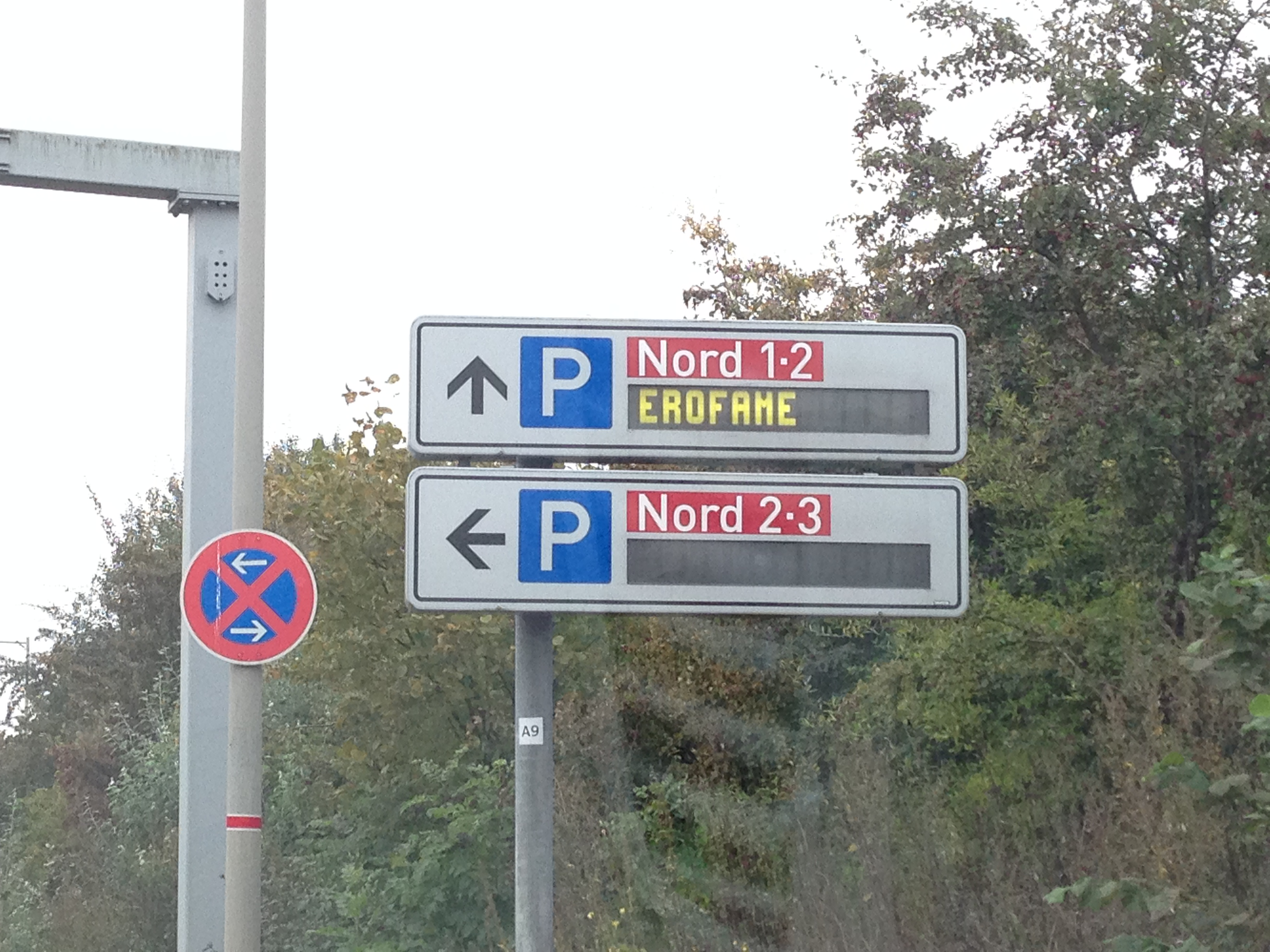
eroFame road sign

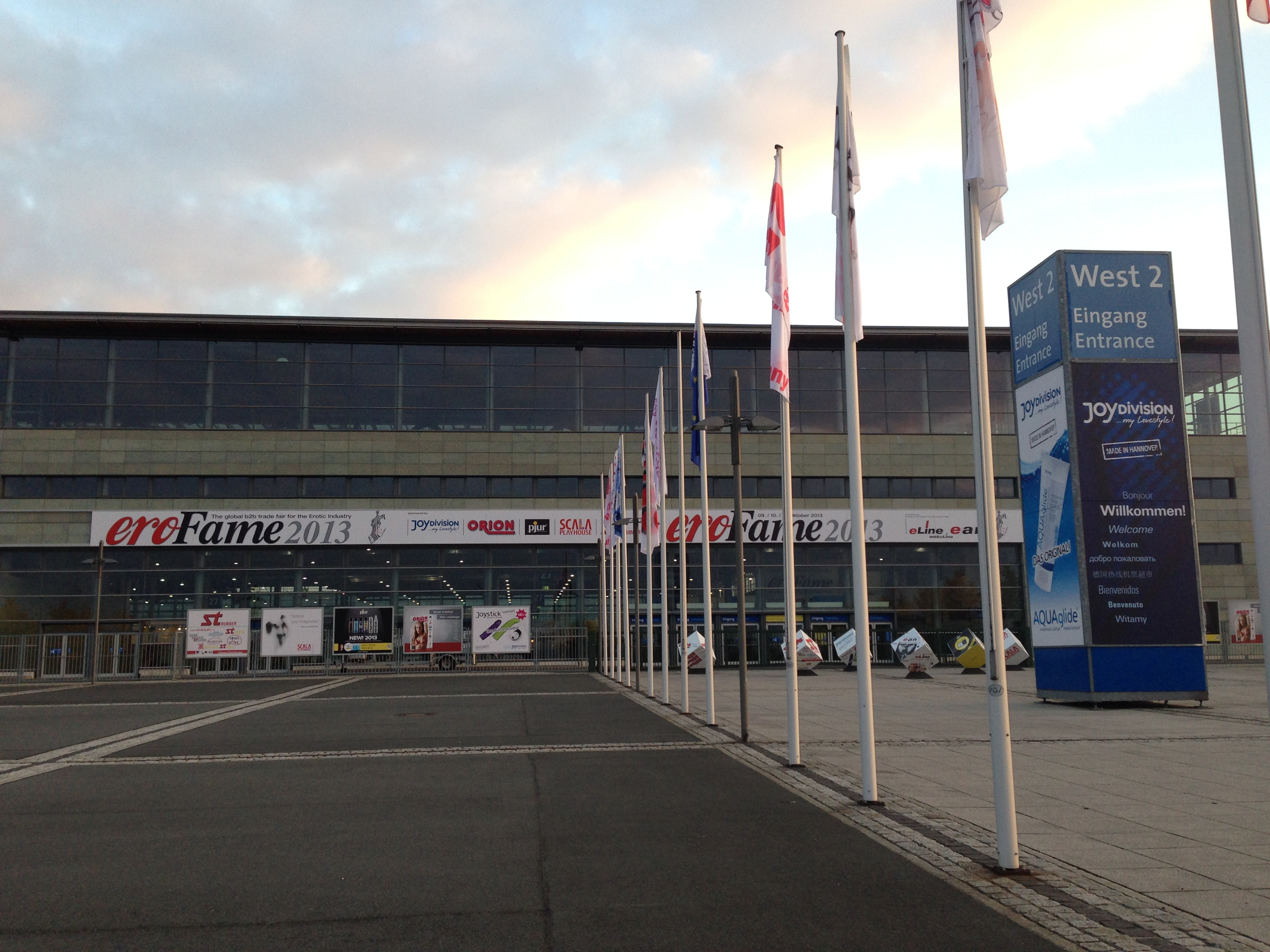
eroFame entrance at Hannover fair ground

== History ==
The first eroFame took place in October 2010 at the Metropolishalle in Filmpark Babelsberg, a film studio in Potsdam near Berlin. Due to the increasing number of exhibitors and the growing interest among trade members, eroFame moved to its current location in Hannover the following year. From 2011 to 2024, eroFame took place at the Hanover Fairground, the world's largest fairground. In 2025, eroFame moved from Hanover to Amsterdam, taking place at RAI Amsterdam.

== Development and exhibitor numbers ==
When eroFame began in 2010, 93 exhibiting companies attended the event. In October 2011, the number of exhibitors was 116, and this increased to 165 in 2012, 191 in 2013, and 200 in 2014.

== The international exhibition committee ==
The international exhibition committee consists of the following companies:

- JOYDIVISION international AG, Germany / USA
- Orion Versand GmbH & Co. KG, Germany
- pjur group S.A., Luxembourg
- Scala 2.0 B.V., Netherlands
- Schneider & Tiburtius GmbH, Germany

The trade convention is organised by Mediatainment Publishing eroFame GmbH.
