= Hefty Fine =

Studio album by Bloodhound Gang
- Released: September 27, 2005
- Recorded: December 2004–March 2005
- Genres: Comedy rock; alternative rock; pop punk; alternative metal
- Length: 39:45
- Labels: Geffen; Republic; Jimmy Franks
- Producer: Jimmy Pop

Bloodhound Gang chronology
Hooray for Boobies (1999)	Hefty Fine (2005)	Show Us Your Hits (2010)

Singles from Hefty Fine
- 1. "Foxtrot Uniform Charlie Kilo" Released: August 1, 2005; 2. "Uhn Tiss Uhn Tiss Uhn Tiss" Released: November 25, 2005; 3. "No Hard Feelings" Released: April 26, 2006

Hefty Fine is the fourth studio album by American alternative rock band Bloodhound Gang, released on September 27, 2005. Produced by band frontman Jimmy Pop, it was Bloodhound Gang's third release on Geffen Records following the band's smash hit Hooray for Boobies which managed to sell over one million copies in the United States and Europe. It was also the band's last album with former guitarist Lüpüs Thünder and the only album with drummer Willie the New Guy—they were replaced in 2008 and 2006 by A members Daniel P. Carter and Adam Perry, respectively. The album contains electronic instruments and heavy emphasis on scatological humor.

The album received poor reviews and is the second-lowest rated album on review aggregator website Metacritic. Despite the critical backlash, the album sold well, particularly in Europe, where it debuted in the top ten in Austria, the Netherlands, and Germany. In the US, the album peaked at number 24 on the Billboard 200.

Three singles were released from the album including "Foxtrot Uniform Charlie Kilo", "Uhn Tiss Uhn Tiss Uhn Tiss", and "No Hard Feelings". The album's first two singles were minor hits, the former charting on six charts, and the latter charting on four.

== Music ==
"Foxtrot Uniform Charlie Kilo" was inspired by a joke between Jimmy Pop and "Evil" Jared Hasselhoff. Originally, the two had sent each other euphemisms for sexual intercourse via email. The joke later evolved into the song. According to Jimmy Pop, "Ralph Wiggum" took the longest to write because it required the band to sift through several scripts of The Simpsons. "Something Diabolical" features vocals from Finnish band HIM's lead singer, Ville Valo, who makes reference to the band in the lyric "Tonight belongs to H.I.M." HIM and Bloodhound Gang toured with each other in the 1990s. Eventually, the groups became close and Jimmy Pop offered to distribute HIM's CDs in America. When it came time to record "Something Diabolical", Valo was asked by the band to record some of the vocals. The hidden track is said by Bam Margera of CKY/Viva La Bam fame. He can also be seen in the video for "Foxtrot Uniform Charlie Kilo" driving a car shaped like a banana, which RockHard Films' Marc Klasfeld directed. "Balls Out" can be heard briefly in the car chase scene from the 2008 movie Drillbit Taylor.

"I'm the Least You Can Do" reuses a piano riff from "Birthday Boy", a song by Jimmy Pop's pre-Bloodhound Gang band Bang Chamber 8, released in 1990 on a self-titled demo tape.

== Title and artwork ==
The cover depicts a large, naked white man, whose genitals are obscured.

The title and album art each have unique stories. Initially, the album was going to be titled Heavy Flow, but Jimmy Pop discovered that there was a Moby song of the same name. Guitarist Lupus Thunder and Pop have expressed their distaste for Moby in the past. After scrapping Heavy Flow, Lupus Thunder and Jimmy Pop began trading emails that featured the recurring gag "now that's a hefty fine". The band later realized that Hefty Fine would make a good name for a record. Lupus Thunder, in an interview with The News-Times said, "it just clicked in his head and [we're] like, 'Hefty fine? Hold on a minute.'" Bassist "Evil" Jared Hasselhoff and Lupus Thunder have also gone on the record stating that the name could be a play on words meaning an attractive, obese person.

As for the cover art, there are several stories. According to "Evil" Jared Hasselhoff, the cover art was originally intended to feature an obese African-American woman, but Geffen insisted that the band change it. According to former guitarist Lupus Thunder, the cover model, Carlin Langley, was chosen out of several applicants. Potential models were asked to send in a picture and a bio, but Carlin Langley sent in a photograph of himself performing fellatio on another man. The band was impressed by Langley's sense of humor and hired him. Carlin Langley went on to post in the official Bloodhound Gang forums, under the user name "Hefty Fine".

A clean version of the album was released in the US, containing instead plain wooden box-style artwork, and the poster of Langley being replaced by a larger version of the image of the band from underneath the CD tray. That version also omitted the skit "Diarrhea Runs in the Family".

== Release and promotion ==
Sometime in 2006, Bloodhound Gang launched a campaign to have the Pennsylvania state anthem changed to their song, "Pennsylvania". A follow-up single (and its accompanying video) titled "Screwing You on the Beach at Night" was released in 2007; an alternate version of the video features former porn actors Till Kraemer and Leonie Saint fornicating while the band is performing around them.

On December 10, 2024, Jimmy Pop announced a vinyl reissue of the album on X for the following year.

== Reception ==
Professional ratings
Aggregate scores
Source	Rating
Metacritic	28/100
Review scores
Source	Rating
AllMusic	2.5/5 stars
Blender	1.5/5 stars
Gigwise	2/5 stars
Hot Press	0/5
IGN	3.5/10
Now	2/5 Ns
Playlouder	0/5 stars
PopMatters	2/10
Rolling Stone	2/5 stars
Ultimate Guitar	7.3/10

=== Critical response ===
According to the review aggregator Metacritic, Hefty Fine received "generally unfavorable reviews" based on a weighted average score of 28 out of 100 from six critic scores. Stephen Thomas Erlewine of AllMusic criticized its lyrical and musical similarities to their previous releases, saying that "the music is tired, almost all plodding 4/4 alt-metal, with the exception of parodies of dance music from the early '90s." Erlewine added that, "the humor may be perpetually adolescent, but the Bloodhound Gang's music is stuck in the '90s, so it can't really appeal to a new era of teenagers."

=== Chart performance ===
On October 15, 2005, Hefty Fine debuted and peaked on the Billboard 200 at number 24, selling 38,066 copies. The next week, the album fell to number 64, selling an additional 23,665 copies. On its sixth and final week, the album dropped to number 181, disappearing off the chart the following week. The album spent a total of six weeks on the chart.

== Track listing ==
All tracks are written by Jimmy Pop except where noted.

Hefty Fine track listing
No.	Title	Writer(s)	Length
1.	"Strictly for the Tardcore"		0:09
2.	"Balls Out"	Jimmy Pop, Lüpüs Thunder	4:19
3.	"Foxtrot Uniform Charlie Kilo"	Jimmy Pop, Jared Hasselhoff	2:51
4.	"I'm the Least You Could Do"		3:58
5.	"Farting with a Walkman On"		3:26
6.	"Diarrhea Runs in the Family"		0:24
7.	"Ralph Wiggum"	Jimmy Pop, The Simpsons writers	2:52
8.	"Something Diabolical" (featuring Ville Valo)	Jimmy Pop, Harry Dean, Jr	5:10
9.	"Overheard in a Wawa Parking Lot"		0:04
10.	"Pennsylvania"		2:57
11.	"Uhn Tiss Uhn Tiss Uhn Tiss" (featuring Natasha Thorp)		4:20
12.	"No Hard Feelings"		9:15
Total length:			39:45

- After "No Hard Feelings" ends, there is four minutes of silence before Bam Margera says "This is Bam and hidden tracks shit dicks out" at 9:11.
- On some releases the track "Jackass" is included as a bonus track. It is sequenced as track 12, moving "No Hard Feelings" to track 13.

== Credits ==
Band members

- Jimmy Pop – lead vocals, guitar, samples, production
- Lüpüs Thünder – backing vocals, guitar
- Willie the New Guy – drums
- Evil Jared – bass
- DJ Q-Ball – backing vocals, turntables, keys, programming

Other personnel

- Rich Gavalis – engineer, editing, mixing
- Natasha Thorp – guest vocals on "Uhn Tiss Uhn Tiss Uhn Tiss"
- Ville Valo – guest vocals on "Something Diabolical"
- Bam Margera – vocals on "No Hard Feelings"

Production

- Ave – producer
- Adam Ayan – mastering
- Holmes Hiebert – graphic design, art direction, photography
- Thorsten König – executive producer
- Adam Kontis – assistant engineer
- Carlin Langley – model
- Avery Lipman – executive producer
- Monte Lipman – executive producer
- Paul Orescan – product manager
- Jason Perry – assistant engineer
- Jimmy Pop – producer
- Jordan Schur – executive producer
- Les Scurry – production coordination

== Charts ==
Chart performance for Hefty Fine
Chart (2005)	Peak position
Australian Albums (ARIA)	32
Austrian Albums (Ö3 Austria)	4
Belgian Albums (Ultratop Flanders)	82
Danish Albums (Hitlisten)	32
Dutch Albums (Album Top 100)	75
German Albums (Offizielle Top 100)	7
New Zealand Albums (RMNZ)	36
Swedish Albums (Sverigetopplistan)	26
Swiss Albums (Schweizer Hitparade)	24
UK Albums Chart	109
US Billboard 200	24

== Certifications ==
Certifications for Hefty Fine
Region	Certification	Certified units/sales
Austria (IFPI Austria)	Gold	15,000^{*}
^{*} Sales figures based on certification alone.
