= Uhn Tiss Uhn Tiss Uhn Tiss =

2005 single by Bloodhound Gang

Single by Bloodhound Gang

from the album Hefty Fine
- Released: November 25, 2005
- Length: 4:20
- Label: Jimmy Franks; Geffen; Republic
- Songwriter: Jimmy Pop
- Producer: Jimmy Pop

Bloodhound Gang singles chronology
"Foxtrot Uniform Charlie Kilo" (2005)	"Uhn Tiss Uhn Tiss Uhn Tiss" (2005)	"No Hard Feelings" (2006)

Music video
- "Uhn Tiss Uhn Tiss Uhn Tiss" on YouTube

"Uhn Tiss Uhn Tiss Uhn Tiss" is the eleventh track and the second single from American comedy rock band Bloodhound Gang's fourth studio album, Hefty Fine (2005). The title is an onomatopoeic representation of a typical four-on-the-floor dance beat. Released on November 25, 2005, the song became a top-20 hit in Austria, Flanders, and Germany.

== Music video ==
Directed by Cousin Mike and Kevin Powers of Mucky Pup, the music video consists of a party in a club called the Wiper Room, a toilet-themed parody of the real-life LA Viper Room. Among the strange things going on in the various "stalls" are a woman in Amish-style (Pennsylvania Dutch) clothing using a butter churn, a woman spinning around on roller skates, the Japanese band Electric Eel Shock playing energetically but silently, a sullen-looking gangster who holds up a chain of hearts, Clark Kent entering a stall to change clothes to Superman, Jemaine Clement as a prophet with followers, the wrestlers Telly "Leatherface" Blackwood and the Executioner "Maurico Broadway" grappling, a dancing man in a leather jacket, a robot choking a scientist (played by David Lovering of the Pixies) who is frantically trying to control it, and a representation of Tony Montana with white powder on his face from eating sugar doughnuts. YouTuber Cory Williams is seen dancing in many shots.

Singer Jimmy Pop is the main focus of the video, as he is singing in a bathroom stall. An attractive girl enters the stall next to him and begins to dance. Pop spies on her through a glory hole in the wall of the stall, but he does not see the girl leave or a dog enter the stall. Pop thinks he is being pleasured by the girl, but instead it is the dog on the other side of the glory hole. Pop leaves the club with the dog and a trail of toilet paper coming off his foot. The remainder of the band appear in a few shots, entering the club with Pop then grooming themselves in front of a mirror while he sings.

Natasha Thorp provides the voice of the female singer, but Vera Kopp is the actress that appears in the video. Remixes are included by DJ Tomcraft and Scooter.

== Charts ==
=== Weekly charts ===
Chart (2006)	Peak position
Australia (ARIA)	46
Austria (Ö3 Austria Top 40)	10
Belgium (Ultratop 50 Flanders)	11
CIS Airplay (TopHit)	16
Germany (GfK)	15
Netherlands (Dutch Top 40)	23
Netherlands (Single Top 100)	25
Russia Airplay (TopHit)	14
Switzerland (Schweizer Hitparade)	76
Ukraine Airplay (TopHit)	72

=== Year-end charts ===
Chart (2006)	Position
Austria (Ö3 Austria Top 40)	58
Belgium (Ultratop 50 Flanders)	54
CIS Airplay (TopHit)	36
Germany (Media Control GfK)	74
Russia Airplay (TopHit)	31

== Release history ==
Region	Date	Format(s)	Label(s)	Ref.
Europe	November 25, 2005	CD	Jimmy Franks; Geffen; Republic	
Australia	February 6, 2006	CD	Jimmy Franks; Geffen; Republic	
