= One Fierce Beer Run =

Video by Bloodhound Gang
- Released: August 12, 2003
- Recorded: 1996–1997, various locations and the Bloodhound Gang tour bus
- Genre: Rockumentary
- Length: 88:53
- Label: Geffen

Bloodhound Gang chronology
| Hooray for Boobies (1999/2000) | One Fierce Beer Run (2003) | Hefty Fine (2005) |

One Fierce Beer Run is a 2003 DVD by American rock band The Bloodhound Gang. It is a behind-the-scenes look at the One Fierce Beer Coaster tour based on the album of the same name. Most of the footage is from the tour bus and has almost no concert footage. The movie also contains music videos from the album including "Fire Water Burn", "Kiss Me Where It Smells Funny" and others. The film was intended to be released in 1998, but was delayed until 2003. The copyright notice at the end of the film says "(C) 2002 Geffen Records".

The band are also seen picking on drummer Spanky G in many scenes – the end scene features him, handcuffed and with a pillow case over his head, pushed into an elevator and left to wander a different floor of the hotel the band were staying in. This is the rumored reason why Spanky left the group in 1999 – the real reason was that he left to focus on his studies.

After 5 minutes of black screen following the copyright notice, a short scene plays showing two women engaging in cunnilingus, followed by Jimmy Pop and Jared Hasselhoff clapping.

== Charts ==
| Chart (2003) | Peak position | Ref(s) |
|---|---|---|
| UK Music Video Chart (OCC) | 29 | |
