= Annina =

Annina is a diminutive of the female given name Anna in the Italian language. Notable people with the name include:

- Annina Enckell
- Annina Ruest

== See also ==
- Anniina Rajahuhta, Finnish hockey player
- Anna Girò, also known as Annina Girò, an Italian mezzo-soprano
- Annina, a role in the opera La traviata
