= Evil Is... =

Studio album by Wolfpac
- Released: January 16, 2001
- Recorded: 1998–2000
- Label: Megaforce

Wolfpac chronology
Something Wicked This Way Comes (1999)	Evil Is... (2001)

Evil Is...
- Alternative cover.

Professional ratings
Review scores
Source	Rating
Allmusic	3/5 stars

Evil Is... is the debut full-length album by Wolfpac. Released in 2001, the album fuses the lyrical themes of death metal with a hip hop-based sound.

== Track listing ==
1. "Thirty Three"
2. "Somethin' Wicked This Way Comes"
3. "Gravedigga"
4. "Death Becomes Her"
5. "Six Disciples of Hell"
6. "Times Run Out"
7. "Los Vengeance des Les Mortes"
8. "Humpty Dance"
9. "New Friend"
10. "In Harm's Way"
11. "Mischief Night"
12. "All These Bitches"
13. "Get Lit"
14. "Lullaby for the Insane"
15. "Hide & Seek"
16. "Someone's Going to Get Their Head Kicked In"
17. "Lockjaw"
18. "Evil Is as Evil Does"
19. "Armageddon"
