= Jared Hasselhoff =

American bassist (born 1971)

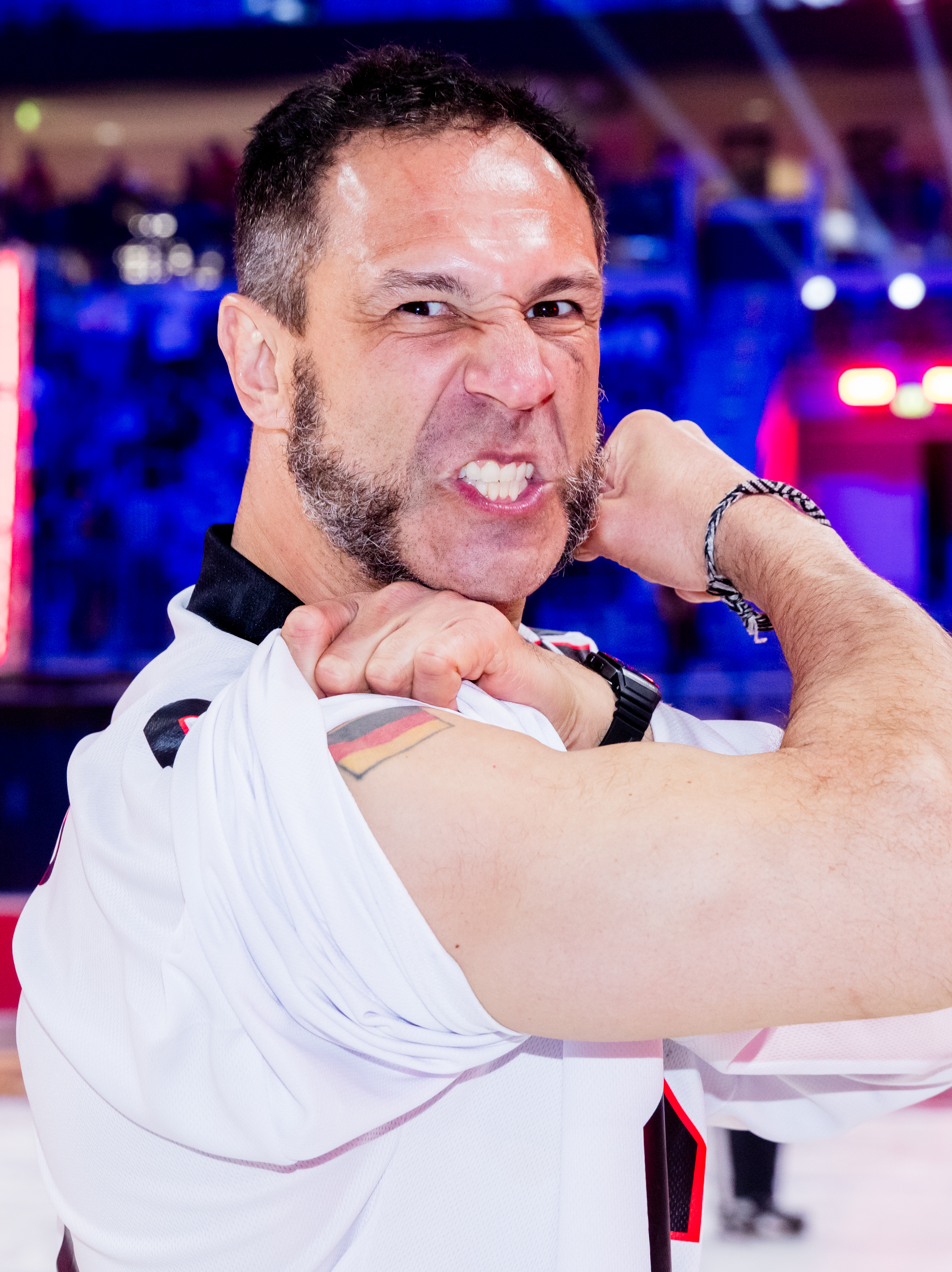
- Hasselhoff in 2024

Background information
- Also known as: Evil Jared
- Born: Jared Hennegan; August 5, 1971 (age 55); Philadelphia, Pennsylvania, U.S.
- Genres: Alternative rock; comedy rock; rap rock
- Occupations: Musician, actor
- Instrument: Bass
- Years active: 1994–present
- Member of: Bloodhound Gang

Jared Hennegan (born August 5, 1971), better known by the stage name "Evil" Jared Hasselhoff, is an American musician and television personality best known for being the bassist of the rock band Bloodhound Gang. Since 2006, he has lived and worked primarily in Germany.

== Early life ==
Hasselhoff was born Jared Hennegan in Philadelphia and raised in Woxall, Pennsylvania. He graduated from Souderton Area High School. He helped establish Woxfest, a rock festival in his hometown. He attended Temple University, where he met future Bloodhound Gang member Jimmy Pop. At various times, Hasselhoff has claimed to be the illegitimate son or tennis partner of Knight Rider actor David Hasselhoff, although neither of these appear to be the case.

== Career ==
=== Bloodhound Gang ===
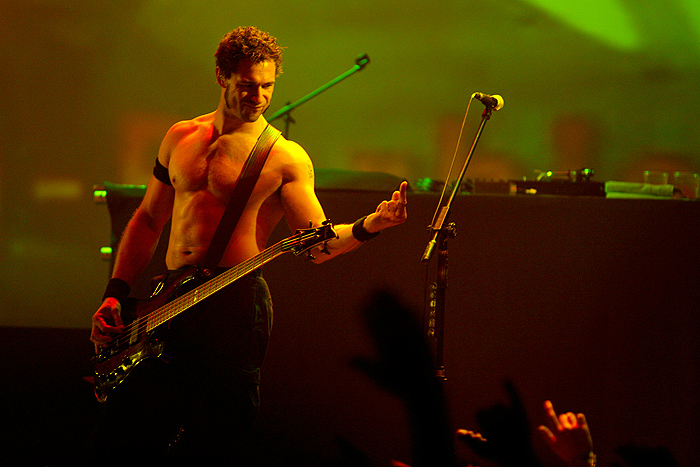
Hasselhoff on stage with the Bloodhound Gang, 2007

As a member of the musical group Bloodhound Gang, Hasselhoff is an Echo award winner and was twice honored with the prestigious Comet award.

=== Other projects ===
In 2007, Hasselhoff played bass for the German crunk artist Tony Damager's song "Totalschaden". He also played bass in the video clip, along with Sido on drums and B-Tight on the guitar.

Hasselhoff participated in the Wok championship 2010 ("Wok-WM 2010") in Oberhof on March 19, 2010. He also participated in the Wok-WM 2011, 2012, 2013, 2014, 2015, and 2022.

Hasselhoff guest-starred as himself in two episodes of the German soap opera Verbotene Liebe, which aired in June 2008 on German television channel Das Erste.

On March 30, 2012, Hasselhoff defeated two-time Olympic discus medalist Lars Riedel via a fourth-round KO to become the German celeb-boxing heavyweight champion.

Hasselhoff currently has a recurring role as himself in the ProSieben game shows Duell um die Welt, Die beste Show der Welt and Joko & Klaas gegen Prosieben.

Hasselhoff is the host of the alternative science magazine Evil Science which airs on the German ProSieben Maxx network.

In 2023, Hasselhoff appeared on the German survival show Arctic Warrior, where he teamed up with Hauke Kuehl, another participant, to survive five days in Finland, while walking through arctic zones of Lapland. Both then went on to win the show.

In December 2024, Hasselhoff took part in a special professional wrestling-themed episode of TV total. Hasselhoff trained and competed alongside full-time German professional wrestler Toni Harting as a tag team for the episode.

== Personal life ==
In 2006, Hasselhoff moved to Berlin, Germany. He originally planned to stay in Germany for just a few months. Over time, however, he extended his stay and spent more and more time in the country. One reason for this move was his mother's enthusiasm for Germany, where she worked as a German teacher in Kassel and Bonn. Hasselhoff also found the longer opening hours of the bars in Germany particularly appealing compared to the USA.

Hasselhoff has obsessive–compulsive disorder (OCD), and has asked for his requested Skittles to be separated by color on at least one rider while on tour. According to his episode of MTV Cribs, he also suffers from irritable bowel syndrome (IBS).

In 2013, Ukraine banned Hasselhoff from entering the country for five years after he allegedly urinated on the Ukrainian flag at a concert in Kyiv. A few days later, the band was due to perform at Russia's Kubana Festival on the Black Sea coast, but the gig did not go ahead due to another concert stunt in which he stuffed the Russian flag into his underpants. Instead, they were questioned by police and were ordered to leave Russia.

== Filmography ==
Year	Title	Role
2003–2005	Viva La Bam	Evil Jared
2005	White Men Can't Rap	Phoenix
2005	A Halfway House Christmas	Santa
2005	TV total	Musical Guest
2005	Video On Trial	Himself
2005	Cribs	Jared Hasselhoff
2006	Howard Stern on Demand	Evil Jared
2006	The Dudesons Movie	Evil Jared
2007	Die Niels Ruf Show	Musical Guest
2008	Verbotene Liebe	Evil Jared
2008	Street Customs Berlin	Evil Jared
2008	Minghags: The Movie	Paramedic
2012	Promi Boxing	The Bloodhound Butcher
2013–2016	Circus Halligalli	Evil Jared
2015	Kartoffelsalat	Nauseous Zombie #1
2015	Mein bester Feind	Bartender
2015	Bülents große Überasschungsshow	Evil Jared
2015	Duell um die Welt	Quizmaster
2016	Mein bester Feind	Well Greased Guy
2016	Evil Science	Host
2017	Die beste Show der Welt	Tag Team Champion
2023	Arctic Warrior	Evil Jared
2025	The Masked Singer Germany	The Dude
