= Bloodhound Gang =

American rock band

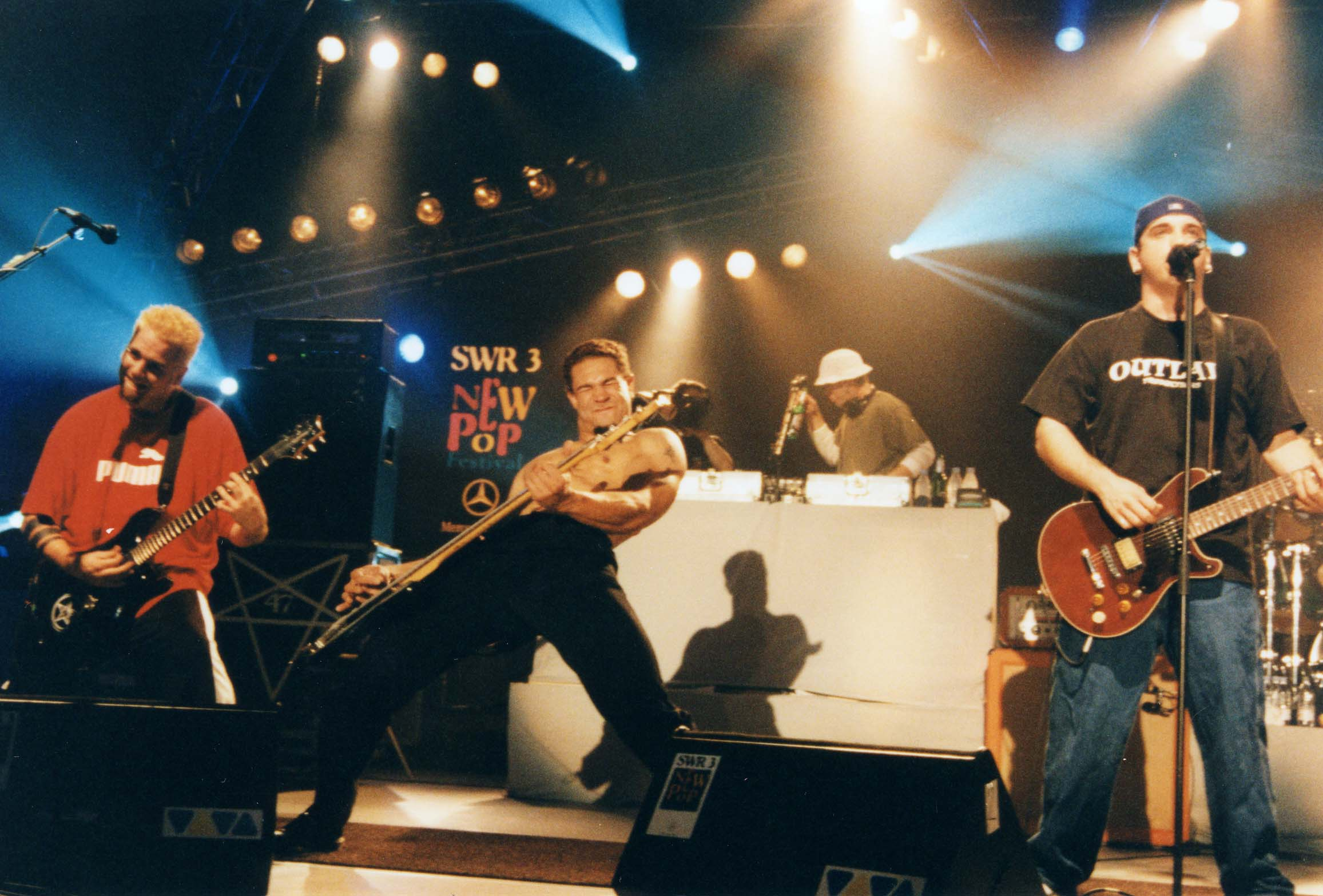
- The Bloodhound Gang performing in 1999

Background information
- Origin: King of Prussia, Pennsylvania, U.S.
- Genres: Alternative rock; comedy rock; rap rock
- Years active: 1992–present
- Labels: Columbia; Cheese Factory; Underdog; Republic; Geffen; Jimmy Franks; UMG
- Spinoff of: Bang Chamber 8 (1988–1992)
- Members: James "Jimmy Pop" Franks; "Evil" Jared Hasselhoff; Harry "DJ Q-Ball" Dean Jr.; Adam "The Yin" Perry; Daniel P. Carter
- Past members: Daddy Long Legs; Kevin Hennessey; Justin Ianelli; Bubba K. Love; Foof; Lazy I; White Steve; Skip O'Pot2Mus; M.S.G.; Lupus Thunder; Tard-E-Tard; Spanky G; Willie The New Guy
- Website: bloodhoundgang.com

The Bloodhound Gang is an American rock band formed by James "Jimmy Pop" Franks and Michael "Daddy Long Legs" Bowe in 1992 in King of Prussia, Pennsylvania. Its lineup since 2009 has consisted of Pop (vocals, guitar), "Evil" Jared Hasselhoff (bass), Daniel P. Carter (guitar), Harry "DJ Q-Ball" Dean Jr. (keyboards), and Adam "The Yin" Perry (drums).

The band is known for its crude and profane lyrics, comedic songs and music videos, and singles such as "The Bad Touch", "Fire Water Burn", "The Ballad of Chasey Lain", "Foxtrot Uniform Charlie Kilo", and "Uhn Tiss Uhn Tiss Uhn Tiss".

== History ==
=== Origin and early days (1988–1995) ===
The Bloodhound Gang's origin dates back to 1988, when rappers James "Jimmy Pop" Franks and Michael "Daddy Long Legs" Bowe formed the band Bang Chamber 8 with their Perkiomen Valley High School classmates Kevin Hennessey and Justin Ianelli. They released a four-song tape, Just Another Demo, in 1990 before Hennessey and Ianelli left the band, which was renamed to the Bloodhound Gang in 1992. The band's new name came from a segment on the 1980s PBS children's show 3-2-1 Contact that featured three young detectives solving mysteries and fighting crime.

Unable to book shows anywhere else, the Bloodhound Gang first performed in the home of "Evil" Jared Hasselhoff, Pop's Temple University classmate who later became the band's bassist. Hasselhoff was given Schlitz beer and Marlboro cigarettes in exchange. The band handed out their first demo tape, also titled Just Another Demo, during these performances. When the floor caved in one night, the band began performing every month at CBGBs in New York City. When asked about the band's tenure at the club, Pop quipped that he had "seen cavemen with better clubs".

In April 1994, the band released their second demo tape, The Original Motion Picture Soundtrack to Hitler's Handicapped Helpers. This resulted in a record deal with Cheese Factory Records. That summer, Pop had a small role in Kurt Fitzpatrick's short film The Chick That Was Naked (1995) and managed to get a Bloodhound Gang song on the soundtrack. In November, the Bloodhound Gang released their first EP, Dingleberry Haze.

=== Use Your Fingers (1995) ===
In March 1995, the Bloodhound Gang signed a record deal with Columbia Records and released their first full-length album, Use Your Fingers. They began touring around the U.S. but band members Daddy Long Legs and Matthew "M.S.G." Clarke, who were angry with Columbia for undisclosed reasons, left the band to form Wolfpac. Bassist Hasselhoff and turntablist Tard-E-Tard joined the group as replacements. When the tour ended, the deal with Columbia was dropped and band members Scott "Skip O'Pot2Mus" Richard and Tard-E-Tard left to pursue non-music careers.

=== One Fierce Beer Coaster (1996–1997) ===
In March 1996, Pop and Hasselhoff returned with a completely new line-up of the band to release its second full-length album, One Fierce Beer Coaster. It was produced by Richard Gavalis, who owned Dome Sound Studios in Royersford, Pennsylvania, local to Pop. New guitarist Matthew "Lupus Thunder" Stigliano had recorded with Gavalis at the Dome with a former band and introduced Pop to Gavalis, who had the first studio in the area to embrace computer recording and could edit live instruments in ways other studios could not. This led to a relationship that followed through to the band's next albums. One Fierce Beer Coaster was first released on Cheese Factory Records (now Republic Records).

The album's leading single, "Fire Water Burn", played a major role in the slow build of interest that ultimately led to the band's mainstream breakthrough. As the band could not previously afford national tours, they promoted themselves by sending their music to radio stations across the country that fit the alternative rock format. One significant early radio breakthrough came when an intern at 107.7 The End in Seattle brought the band to the attention of the music director, who liked what he heard and played "Fire Water Burn" on his Friday night show. The feature prompted a flood of phone calls asking about the song and the band. The director passed the song on to his friend, a fellow music director at KROQ-FM in Los Angeles, who then added it to her playlist. The snowball effect meant the band was overwhelmed with demands for their records, which they struggled to meet. According to manager Brett Alperowitz in an interview with HitQuarters, the band became the object of a bidding war between record labels, which quickly grew so intense that Madonna's label Maverick "really wanted to sign the band in the worst possible way, even to the point where [he] had to tell Madonna that [he] couldn't put her on the phone with Jimmy Pop".

Eventually, the Bloodhound Gang signed with Geffen Records, which re-released One Fierce Beer Coaster in December 1996. Geffen refused to release the song "Yellow Fever" because of its graphic lyrical content about East Asian women, including lyrics such as "like an Oriental rug, 'cause I lay her where I please / then I blindfold her with dental floss and get on my knees" and "oh me Chinky, she's so kinky, got me hot like Nagasaki / burnin' up like napalm, burstin' like an A-bomb".

The Bloodhound Gang also embarked on their first "real tour" of the United States and Europe, including presentations on Loveline, The Howard Stern Show, Ricki Lake, and The Jenny McCarthy Show. After a couple of years of doing shows, taking advantage of their online popularity, and spreading the word through retail and radio as much as they could on an independent level, they began to experience major success.

=== Hooray for Boobies (1998–2000) ===
On October 4, 1999, the band released its third album Hooray for Boobies in Europe; due to legal issues, the U.S. release was delayed until February 29, 2000. This album was recorded in California, where the band and their engineer Gavalis relocated. The album was recorded partially at a Los Angeles studio the band rented, and partially at Gavalis' home in the Valley. Powered by the hit single "The Bad Touch", they embarked on two more tours of Europe, where their popularity had increased dramatically; "The Bad Touch" and Hooray for Boobies reached No. 1 in Germany, where the band's cover of "Along Comes Mary" was also a top 10 hit. They returned to tour after selling over 5 million albums.

In 2003, the band released the DVD One Fierce Beer Run, which chronicled their 1997 One Fierce Beer Coaster tour.

=== Hefty Fine (2004–2007) ===
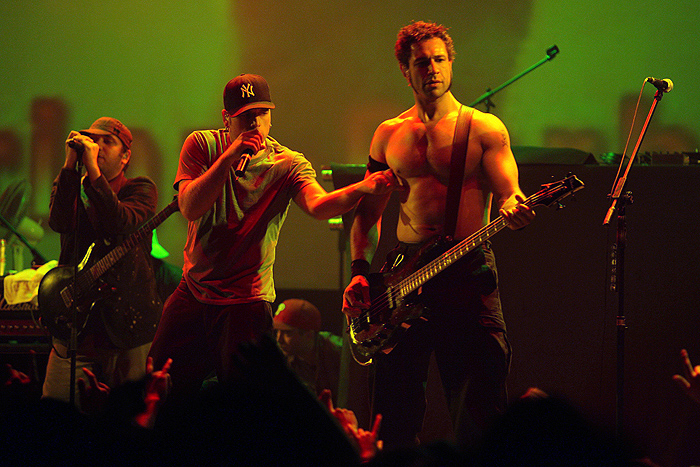
The band in 2007

The band's fourth album Hefty Fine was released on September 13, 2005. The title is a reference to an incident in which Hasselhoff was arrested and fined while appearing on the "Scavenger Hunt" episode of the MTV series Viva La Bam, during which he attempted to urinate from the top of a parking lot into a Dixie cup that Pop was holding. He was fined $10,000, which Pop allegedly had to pay, as discussed in the "un-commentary" of the Viva La Bam DVD release. The CD's original title, Heavy Flow, was scrapped when it was noticed that Moby had a song with the same name.

The first single, "Foxtrot Uniform Charlie Kilo", gained heavy rotation on music video channels. Although the track "No Hard Feelings" had recently broken into the Modern Rock Top 50, their second single "Uhn Tiss Uhn Tiss Uhn Tiss" (which is featured in a Blaupunkt, a BGL Grand Wizard ad) had started radio circulation, with a music video airing on a few music channels. Other songs from the album were part of a campaign by the Bloodhound Gang to change the Pennsylvania state anthem to their own song "Pennsylvania", as well as "Something Diabolical", featuring HIM's Ville Valo. In 2007, the band recorded a single, "Screwing You on the Beach at Night", accompanied by a video based on the one for Chris Isaak's song "Wicked Game".

=== Hard-Off and singles (2008–2016) ===
In October 2008, Thunder quit the band. The band said he had decided to never again tour with them. He had earlier confessed to being the complainer of the group and arguing with the other members while vowing not to leave the band. English guitarist Daniel P. Carter was confirmed as the band's new lead guitarist.

Pop announced during a radio interview in Boston that the band was working on a new album, featuring around 10 to 12 songs. Many media outlets reported that the name of the album would be Getting Laid on a School Bus with a release date of 2012. On December 4, 2011, Pop announced that he "just narrowed 25-30 demos down to 10-12 to finish".

In late 2010, the band released a new song, "Altogether Ooky". On November 15, DJ Q-Ball mentioned on his Facebook page that the band was going to Berlin to shoot a music video for the song, which would also be included on a greatest hits compilation album. The greatest hits album, Show Us Your Hits, was released on December 21, featuring new songs "Altogether Ooky" and an English version of Die Atzen's "Disco Pogo", alongside the older hits. In an interview in 2011, Evil Jared stated that the new album would be released in either 2012 or 2013. Q-Ball also mentioned on Twitter that signs pointed to either late 2012 or early 2013 as for the release, and that the album was "moving along very nicely", as well as claiming that it was their best album to date. A second music video was also released for "Screwing You on the Beach at Night", featuring the band playing in a small room while porn stars Till Kraemer and Leonie Saint have sex in the center of the room. At the end of the video, Kraemer ejaculates in the hand of Pop, who then rubs the semen through his hair in a reference to the film There's Something About Mary. The video had been filmed in 2007, but was not released until 2010.

In February 2014, Pop wrote on Twitter that he was recording vocals every day for the album. On August 8, a new single entitled "Chew Toy" was announced, along with a pre-order of the vinyl with a release date of August 19. The song was uploaded to YouTube later that day. "American Bitches" was released on the band's YouTube account October 20, with a vinyl release date of late December 2014. "Dimes" was released on February 24.

"Clean Up in Aisle Sexy" was released May 12, along with remixes by Mike Emilio, M.I.K.E. Push, and Psyko Punkz. In September 2015, a fifth single from the album, the new wave-inspired "Uncool as Me", featuring Joey Fatone, was released. Pre-orders for the album began in October 2015, with a release window of early December. The album, Hard-Off, was released on December 18, 2015.

=== Hiatus and reissues (2016–present) ===
In July 2016, MVD Audio reissued Hooray for Boobies on blue vinyl; One Fierce Beer Coaster followed on yellow vinyl that September. Both releases were limited to 1,500 copies.

In an interview with the German site KinKats on March 4, 2017, Hasselhoff joked that the Bloodhound Gang would only reform and tour if Donald Trump was impeached. When asked in another interview later in 2017 about the current status of the group, he stated that he was unsure if they still existed, but added that he would still be considered a member.

On March 27, 2020, a 20th anniversary vinyl reissue of Hooray for Boobies, including remixes, was released.

In July 2023, Pop said that he is still working on making Bloodhound Gang music, with new songs in development.

In October 2024, Hasselhoff posted a video to his Instagram account implying that the Bloodhound Gang would return and mockingly claiming that the band's return would be bigger news than the Oasis reunion, Linkin Park Scientology controversy, Dave Grohl infidelity scandal, and Sean Combs sexual misconduct allegations.

In July 2025, Pop posted a series of images to his X account, revealing that the band had begun recording demos with Adam "The Yin" Perry and Daniel P. Carter for the upcoming new album at a studio in Malta.

== Onstage antics ==
The band caused controversy in 2006 when they started using a "golden shower" act onstage during a cover of Depeche Mode's song "Enjoy the Silence" at Rock am Ring and Pinkpop.

During a concert in Kyiv on July 30, 2013, Hasselhoff desecrated a Ukrainian flag by urinating on it. The incident drew outrage from local politicians, and the band faced criminal charges of hooliganism. During a concert in Odesa a few days later, Hasselhoff stuffed a Russian flag down the front of his pants and pulled it out of the back while telling the crowd "don't tell Putin". The band's Russian show in Anapa was cancelled and the band members were assaulted at the airport, including being pelted with eggs and rotten tomatoes. An American flag was also trampled and spat on. Vladimir Markin of the Investigative Committee of Russia said that the department was prepared to file criminal charges if prosecutors thought they had a case. Hasselhoff publicly apologized for the profanation of a state symbol of Russia, but the band members were still forced to immediately cancel their Russian stay and their visas were summarily cancelled. They left Russia from Sheremetyevo International Airport on August 3.

== Musical style ==
Musically, the Bloodhound Gang has been described as alternative rock, comedy rock, and rap rock. Other, less common labels include punk rock, pop-punk, alternative metal, funk metal, rap metal, nu metal, and hip-hop in general.

The band is known for its crude lyrics that are full of sexual innuendo.

== Members ==
Current lineup

- Jimmy Pop (James Franks) – lead vocals, rhythm guitar, occasional keyboards (1992–2015, 2023–present); lead guitar (1992–1994)
- Evil Jared Hasselhoff (Jared Hennegan) – bass, backing vocals (1995–2015, 2023–present)
- DJ Q-Ball (Harry Dean Jr.) – keyboards, synthesizer, turntables, programming, samples, hype man, backing vocals (1995–2015, 2023–present)
- The Yin (Adam Perry) – drums, backing vocals (2006–2015, 2023–present)
- Daniel P. Carter – lead guitar, backing vocals (2009–2015, 2023–present)

Former members

- Daddy Long Legs (Michael Bowe) – lead vocals, bass (1992–1995)
- Kevin Hennessey – lead vocals, synthesizer (1992; only with band as Bang Chamber 8)
- Justin Ianelli – guitar, synthesizer (1992; only with band as Bang Chamber 8)
- Bubba K. Love (Kyle Seifert) – turntables, backing vocals (1992–1993)
- Foof (Jack Vandergrift) – drums, backing vocals (1992)
- Lazy I – backing vocals (1992)
- White Steve – backing vocals (1992)
- Skip O'Pot2Mus (Scott Richard) – drums, backing vocals (1992–1995)
- M.S.G. (Matthew Clarke) – turntables, backing vocals (1994–1995)
- Lupus Thunder (Matthew Stigliano) – lead guitar, backing vocals (1996–2008), turntables (1994–1996)
- Tard-E-Tard – turntables (1995)
- Spanky G (Michael Guthier) – drums (1995–1999)
- Willie The New Guy (Billy Brehony) – drums (1999–2006)

== Discography ==
Studio albums

- Use Your Fingers (1995)
- One Fierce Beer Coaster (1996)
- Hooray for Boobies (1999)
- Hefty Fine (2005)
- Hard-Off (2015)

== Awards and nominations ==
Year	Awards	Work	Category	Result
1997	GAFFA Awards	Themselves	Årets Nye Udenlandske Navn	Won
1999	Žebřík Music Awards	Themselves	Best International Surprise	Nominated
1999	Rockbjörnen	"The Bad Touch"	Best International Song	Won
2000	ECHO Awards	Themselves	Best International Newcomer	Won
2000	ECHO Awards	Themselves	Best International Group	Nominated
2000	Viva Comet Awards	Themselves	Best Live Act	Won
2000	Viva Comet Awards	Themselves	Best Rock Act	Won
2000	Viva Comet Awards	Themselves	Viva Zwei Audience Award	Nominated
2000	Q Awards	"The Bad Touch"	Best Video	Nominated
2000	Billboard Music Video Awards	"The Bad Touch"	Pop Clip of the Year	Nominated
2001	Meteor Music Awards	"The Bad Touch"	Best Selling International Single Group	Won

== See also ==
- One Fierce Beer Run, a DVD with behind-the-scenes footage from the One Fierce Beer Coaster tour
