= Wolfpac =

American rap rock group

- Origin: Red Hill, Pennsylvania, U.S.
- Genres: Horrorcore, rap rock
- Years active: 1997–present
- Labels: Chord, Megaforce, SugarDaddy
- Members: Core members: Daddy Long Legs; Buddha Extended members: Hype; Hazard; Wraith; Genocide; Bane; Massacre; Tweak Girls of Wolfpac: Anthrax; Genie Genocide; SyKo Shortyy
- Past members: Troy "MC Entropy" Hinson M.S.G. M. Clarke, Freek, D.K.
- Website: wolfpac.com

Wolfpac (stylized as WOLFPAC) is an American rap rock group formed in 1997 by Michael Bowe, who uses the stage name Daddy Long Legs. He founded Wolfpac after departing Bloodhound Gang. Wolfpac musical style fuses hip hop beats and metal samples. Its lyrical style draws from horrorcore, focusing on subjects such as resurrection, revenge, necrophilia, and standing up for one's own beliefs. The group's live performances from time to time include a DJ, guitar player and strippers.

Wolfpac released its debut EP, Somethin Wicked This Way Comes, on May 18, 1999, through Chord Recordings. Daddy Long Legs claims that he funded the EP's production by robbing graves and selling the bones to occult stores. Wolfpac expanded its cult following through appearances on The Howard Stern Show and Opie and Anthony (the latter show being which one of the members at the time MC Entropy; later known as Troyquan, would join as a producer several years later), and released the album, Evil Is... on January 16, 2001, on Megaforce Records. They have toured the US several times as well as Japan and the UK.

In 2006, the group released the underground hip hop compilation When There's No More Room in Hell: Volume I, featuring contributions from Big B and The Dirtball, Danny Diablo, Grave Plott, Jason Porter and Intrinzik, Q-Strange, Vanilla Ice, and many others. The group released its first pornographic DVD, The Girls of WOLFPAC Volume 1, in 2007 and its second, The Girls of WOLFPAC Volume 2, in 2008. Both were nominated for an AVN Award (2008 for Best Pro-Am Release and in 2009 for Most Outrageous Sex Scene). Wolfpac has performed at the Gathering of the Juggalos annually since 2004 and hosts the Super Deluxe Fun Time Variety Hour on Psychopathic TV (formerly known as W-Fuck-Off Radio). In 2010 they made a cameo in American Western comedy film Big Money Rustlas In 2017, the band appeared on Comic Book Men (Season 6, Episode 11) where they sold a lamp prop from A Christmas Story to help fund their upcoming tour. They launched a full service production and consulting company SugarDaddy Productions, Inc and are still actively producing many different projects from reality TV to professional wrestling.

== Discography ==
- Somethin' Wicked This Way Comes (1999)
- Evil Is... (2001)
- Square Peg Round Hole (2013)
