= Jimmy Pop =

American musician (born 1972)

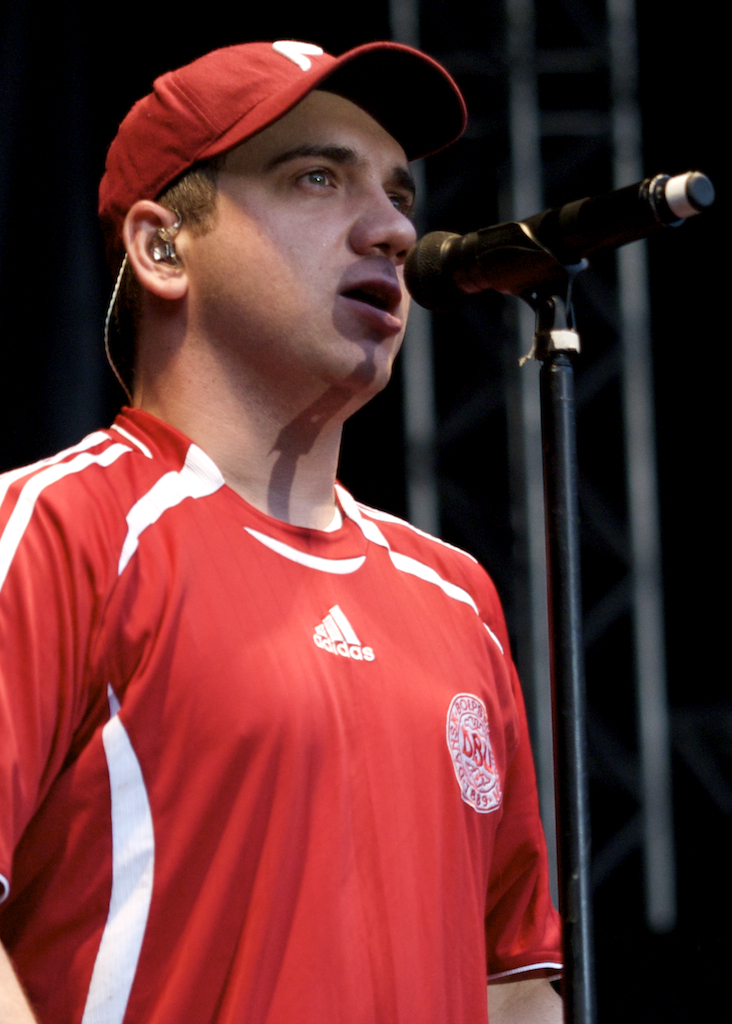
- Pop performing in 2009

Background information
- Also known as: Jimmy Pop Ali (1991–1997)
- Born: James Moyer Franks; August 27, 1972 (age 54); Trappe, Pennsylvania, U.S.
- Genres: Comedy rock; rap rock; alternative rock; pop punk
- Occupations: Rapper; singer; musician; songwriter
- Instruments: Vocals; guitar
- Years active: 1988–present
- Member of: Bloodhound Gang
- Formerly of: Bang Chamber 8; The DiCamillo Sisters

James Moyer Franks (born August 27, 1972), better known by his stage name Jimmy Pop (originally Jimmy Pop Ali), is an American musician. He is the lead vocalist, rhythm guitarist, primary songwriter, and one of the founding members of the comedic rock band Bloodhound Gang.

== Early life and education ==
James Moyer Franks was born in Trappe, Pennsylvania, the son of Alice Ann (born Moyer) and Richard Lee Franks. He is of German and Native American heritage, with Jewish ancestry. He was raised Lutheran, but ceased practicing as soon as his parents approved his request to do so.

He graduated from Perkiomen Valley High School in 1990 and commenced studies in mass communication and history at Temple University in Philadelphia, Pennsylvania, where he met future Bloodhound Gang bassist Jared Hennegan.

== Career ==
=== Bang Chamber 8 ===
Franks played in a Depeche Mode cover band called Bang Chamber 8 with Mike Bowe (later known as Daddy Long Legs). The lineup was Franks and Bowe on synths, Kevin Hennessey on lead vocals and Justin Ianelli on guitar and additional synths. In 1990, Bang Chamber 8 released a cassette of four original songs: "Wouldn't It Be Nice", "Birthday Boy", "Ice Cubes" and "War Chimes". These songs had nothing in common, lyrically or musically, with the Bloodhound Gang.

Bang Chamber 8 split in 1991. In 1992, Franks and Bowe started a hip hop group called the Bloodhound Gang which later became more of an alternative rock band, also adopting their respective stage names. Daddy Long Legs left the Bloodhound Gang in 1995.

=== Bloodhound Gang ===
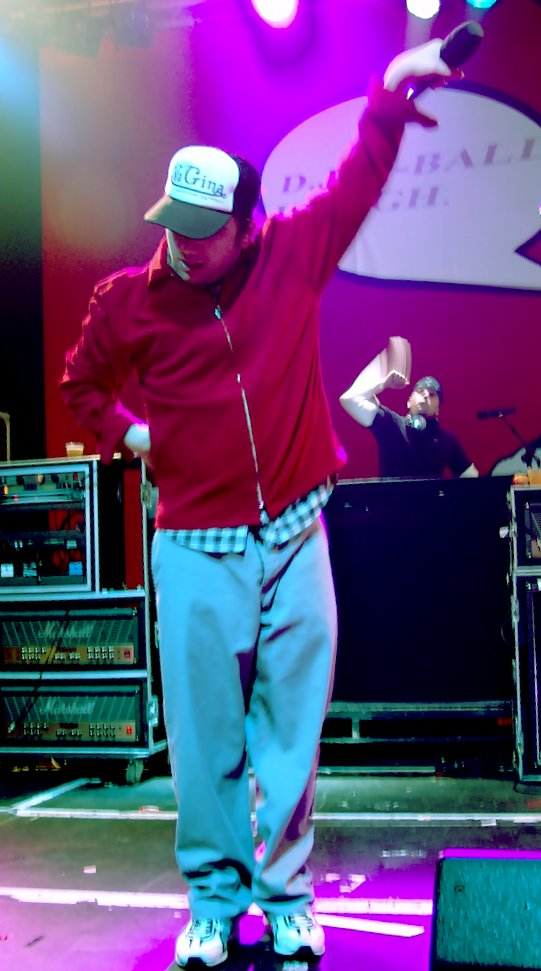
Jimmy Pop performing with the Bloodhound Gang, 2005

=== Side projects ===
Pop collaborated with Bam Margera, Brandon DiCamillo, and Jess Margera as The DiCamillo Sisters to record a Christmas single titled "But Why's It So Cold?" along with an accompanying video. Pop collaborated with dance artist Tomcraft for a song called "Broadsword Calling Danny Boy" in 2006. The song is featured on Tomcraft's official MySpace. In 2007, Pop collaborated with German group Scooter for a song titled "The Shit That Killed Elvis", which was featured on their album The Ultimate Aural Orgasm. Bam Margera can also be heard in the song's intro. The song reached number 2 in the German Hip Hop chart and remained there for two weeks. In 2010, Pop collaborated with German group Die Atzen for an English version of the song "Disco Pogo" which was featured on the Jersey Shore soundtrack. In 2022, he collaborated with Russian Hardbass group Russian Village Boys on their song "Daddy WTF?", with its music video being released on February 22.

=== Television and film appearances ===
Pop made an appearance in the CKY series of films, during a shopping cart race scene and slap fight in CKY 4. He also appeared in an episode of Viva La Bam titled "Limo vs Lambo", in which Pop borrowed Bam Margera's Lamborghini without telling him, causing Margera to accuse his close friends (specifically Ryan Dunn) of doing the deed. He also appeared on the Viva La Bam episode "Rockstars", in which Don Vito and Phil Margera attempt to become rock stars, leading Jimmy Pop to French kiss Don Vito onstage.

Pop has appeared on The Dudesons, being one of the people throwing darts during the human dart board stunt with Jarppi Leppälä. Pop appeared with fellow Bloodhound Gang member Evil Jared Hasselhoff in the film Minghags: The Movie, directed by Bam Margera. They are credited in the film as Jimmy Pop Ali and Evil Jared "Hollywood" Hasselhoff. Pop also appears in Bam Margera's movie called Where the ♯$&% Is Santa?. He appears in the music video for the Oleander's cover of "Boys Don't Cry".

== Filmography ==
Year	Title	Role
1995	The Chick That Was Naked	Sleazy interviewer
1997	The Howard Stern Show	Jimmy Pop
1998	Kin	Don
1998	MTV Rocks Off	Guest panelist
2000	Die Harald Schmidt Show	Himself
2002	CKY4: The Latest & Greatest	Jimmy Pop
2003	One Fierce Beer Run	Himself
2003–2005	Viva la Bam	Jimmy Pop
2004	Bam Margera Presents HIM: The Making of 'The Sacrament'	Himself
2004–2008	Radio Bam	Jimmy Pop
2005	TV total	Musical guest
2005	Video On Trial	Himself
2005	Cribs	Jimmy Pop
2006	Howard Stern on Demand	Jimmy Pop
2006	The Dudesons	Jimmy Pop
2007	Bam's Unholy Union	Jimmy Pop
2007	Die Niels Ruf Show	Musical guest
2007	Howard Stern On Demand	Jimmy Pop
2008	Minghags: The Movie	Paramedic
2008	Bam Margera Presents: Where the#$&% Is Santa?	Jimmy Pop

== Music videos ==
Year	Song	Artist	Role
2000	"Boys Don't Cry"	Oleander	Apartment tenant
2000	"Forever as One"	Vengaboys	Himself
2022	"Daddy WTF?"	Russian Village Boys	Himself
