= Creed Bratton =

American actor and musician (born 1943)

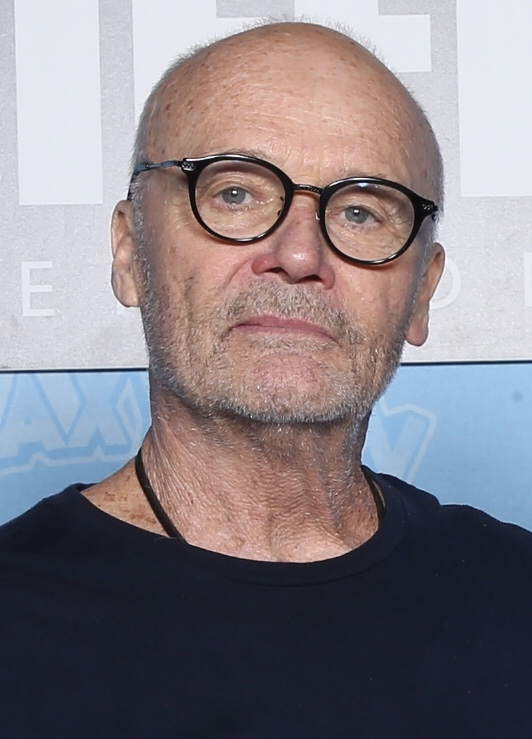
- Bratton at GalaxyCon Raleigh 2019
- Born: William Charles Schneider; February 8, 1943 (age 83); Los Angeles, California, U.S.
- Occupations: Actor; musician
- Years active: 1967–present
- Television: The Office
- Spouse(s): Josephine Fitzpatrick (m. 1967; div. 1974) Claudia Anderson (m. 1976; div. 1983)
- Children: 2
- Musical career
- Genres: Rock; pop rock; folk rock; psychedelic rock
- Instruments: guitar; vocals
- Labels: Dunhill; Kindred; Alien Chicken
- Formerly of: The Grass Roots
- Website: creedbratton.com

Creed Bratton (born William Charles Schneider; February 8, 1943) is an American actor and musician. A former member of the rock band the Grass Roots, he is best known for playing a fictionalized version of himself on the NBC comedy The Office (2005–2013), which earned him five nominations for the Screen Actors Guild Award for Outstanding Performance by an Ensemble in a Comedy Series.

== Early life and education ==
Bratton was born William Charles Schneider in Los Angeles, and grew up in Coarsegold, California, a small town near Yosemite National Park.

== Musical career ==
=== Early years ===
Bratton adopted his new name while on a global excursion as a traveling musician. He traveled through Europe, Africa and the Middle East. He played guitar at a large folk festival in Israel, appearing with his group the Young Californians. Fellow American and guitarist Warren Entner witnessed Bratton's performance and asked to give him a call when he got back to the United States. In 1966, they formed a partnership and recruited the remaining members needed for their group, the 13th Floor. Bratton played lead guitar, Rick Coonce played drums, Entner played rhythm guitar and Kenny Fukomoto played bass. The Young Californians recorded a demo and sent it to Dunhill, a new record company headed by Lou Adler.

=== The Grass Roots ===
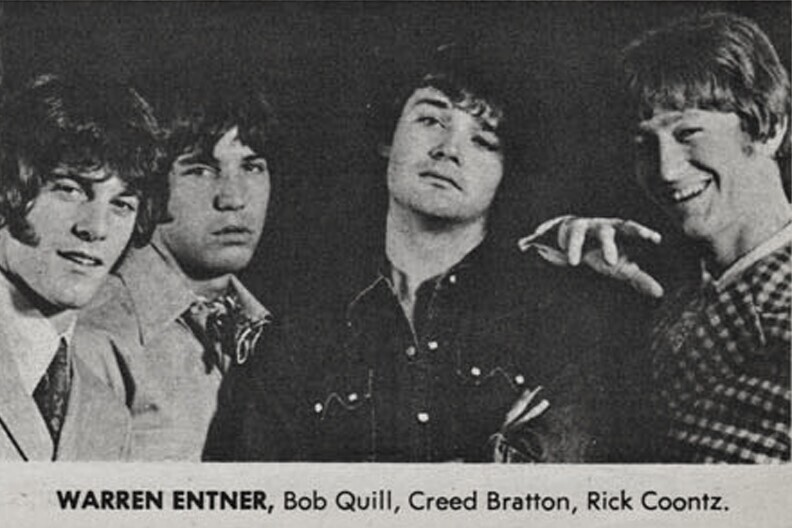
Bratton (second from right) with The Grass Roots in 1967

Producers/songwriters P. F. Sloan and Steve Barri heard the demo and liked it. They needed new band members for a folk-rock group that they had created in 1965. The 13th Floor lost their bass player to the military draft during this time, and quickly recruited Rob Grill, changing the band's name to the "Grass Roots" for prior name recognition. The group went straight to the Top 10 with the song "Let's Live for Today" in 1967 and toured the United States. Iconic hit songs such as "Midnight Confessions" cemented the group's standing as major contributors to the rock-music scene.

The Grass Roots had top songwriters offering their best songs to them and wrote many songs themselves. For their major songs, music on the recordings was played by the LA studio musicians known as the Wrecking Crew. Bratton co-wrote the songs "Beatin' Round the Bush", "No Exit" and "Hot Bright Lights", and self-composed "Dinner for Eight" and "House of Stone". He sang lead vocals on "This Precious Time" and "Dinner for Eight". Bratton played with the group on its albums Let's Live for Today, Feelings, Golden Grass (a compilation) and Lovin' Things. Three of the albums charted, and Golden Grass received a gold record certification. He took part in ten of the group's singles, eight of which charted; "Midnight Confessions" received a gold record certification.

The Grass Roots played at the Fantasy Fair and Magic Mountain Music Festival on Sunday, June 11, 1967, during the "Summer of Love" as their top-ten hit "Let's Live for Today" was hitting the airwaves. Though the music festival occurred before the Monterey Pop Festival, it was not filmed as was the latter festival (see List of electronic music festivals). On Sunday, October 27, 1968, the group played at the San Francisco Pop Festival and then played at the Los Angeles Pop Festival and Miami Pop Festival in December as the top-ten hit "Midnight Confessions" was becoming popular.

In April 1969, Bratton became frustrated by Dunhill's refusal to allow the band to write its own songs and play the instruments on its records (although the members did play alone at concerts). After a disastrous appearance at the Fillmore West in April 1969, Bratton was asked to leave the band.

=== Solo years ===
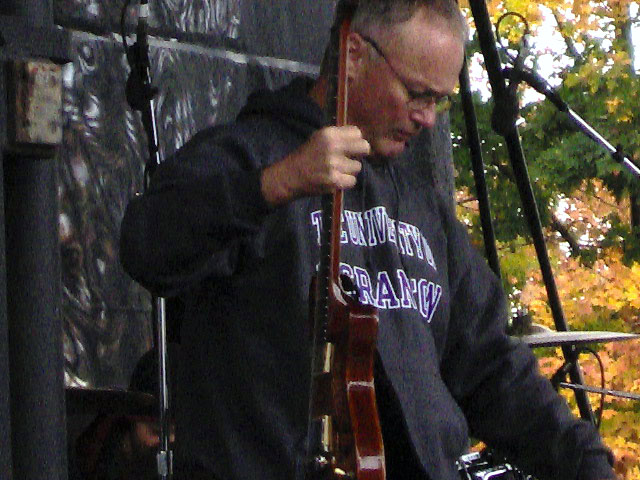
Bratton in 2011

In 2001 and 2002, Bratton released three albums showcasing his solo recordings since the 1960s with the assistance of Peter White. In 2007, he presented an induction award to the Wrecking Crew at the Musicians Hall of Fame. In 2008, he released another album of new music with producer Jon Tiven. In 2010, Bratton released an album titled "Bounce Back" with producer Dave Way. In 2011, Bratton released an album of greatest hits from his first three solo albums, titled "Demo". In 2010 and 2012, Bratton performed live at the SXSW festival. In 2013, Bratton released an original work in three acts as an audio biography titled Tell Me About It. Songs ranged from those recently written to pieces that he had written decades before. Bratton has stated that he listens to jazz and classical music.

== Acting career ==
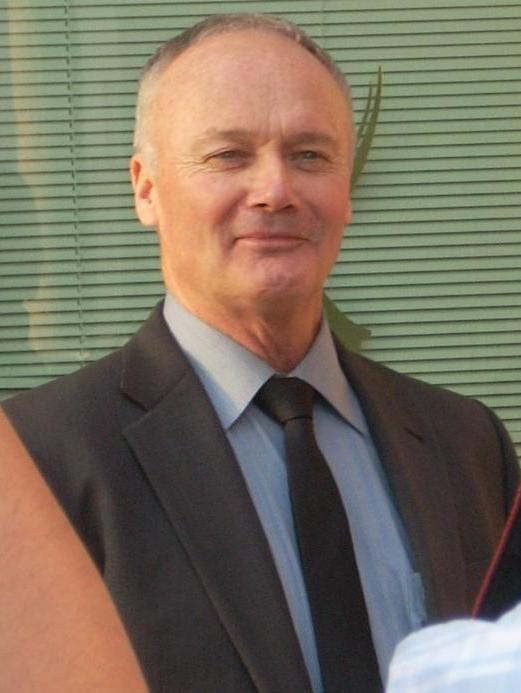
Bratton in 2009

Bratton began to pursue an acting career in 1975. He has appeared in films such as Mask and Heart Like a Wheel. He was a cast member, playing a fictional version of himself, on NBC's Emmy and SAG award-winning The Office. In a deleted scene from the episode "Booze Cruise", he speaks about his time with the Grass Roots. In Season 3 Episode 10 "A Benihana Christmas", Creed sings a karaoke rendition of his song "Spinnin' N Reelin'" during the Christmas party. In a deleted scene from Season 3 Episode 21 "Product Recall", the reporter from the Scranton Times recognizes him as Creed Bratton from the band the Grass Roots and mentions that he wrote his obituary. In the episode "Money", he says "he never goes bankrupt", as all his debt "is always transferred to William Charles Schneider" (which is his birth name), while holding an allegedly fake passport on camera. In the series finale, his character is revealed to be a part of Grass Roots, and was arrested after being a wanted fugitive living at the Dunder Mifflin office. This episode also features Bratton performing his song "All the Faces".

In 2008, he appeared in a short film with Kyle Gass titled Just One of the Gynos, which won an award for best short film at the 2008 Malibu International Film Festival. He appeared in the feature film Labor Pains in 2009. His recent film projects are The Ghastly Love of Johnny X, written, produced and directed by Paul Bunnell; I Am Ben, written, produced and directed by Mathew Brady and Gaelan Connell; and Terri produced by David Guy Levy. Terri was selected by the Sundance Film Festival 2011 to appear in the US dramatic competition. It was one of only 16 films selected from 1,102 submissions to the US dramatic category. In 2012, he appeared as special guest star in Staged with Brandon Olive who appeared with him in Just One of the Gynos. In 2013, he starred in Saving Lincoln, a biography set during the American Civil War. In 2025, he appeared in a guest role in the animated series Smiling Friends and in the A24 film Primetime in 2026.

== Personal life ==
Bratton has been married twice. He has two children.

== Filmography ==
=== Film ===
Year	Title	Role	Notes
1968	With Six You Get Eggroll	Himself	As a member of The Grass Roots
1983	Heart Like a Wheel	Photographer	
1985	Mask	Carnival Ticket Taker	
1987	The Wild Pair	Dalton	
1988	Seven Hours to Judgment	Subway Worker	
1991	Neon City	Guard at Neon	Also worked as a grip
2006	The Manual	Maj. Edwards	Short film
2008	Just One Of The Gynos	Dr. Gus Callery	Short film
2009	Remembering Nigel	Himself	
2011	I Am Ben	Dr. Cobb	
2011	Terri	Uncle James	
2012	The Ghastly Love of Johnny X	Mickey O'Flynn	
2012	The Guilt Trip	Suitor	
2012	Melvin Smarty		
2013	Saving Lincoln	Senator Charles Sumner	
2015	Band of Robbers	Dobbins	
2015	The Sound of Magic	SRC	
2018	The Sisters Brothers	Quarrel Saloon Guy Town 2	
2021	Hero Mode	James Tisdale	
2024	Portland Is the New Portland	Isaac Blitzer	Short Film
2025	Bart Bagalzby and the Garbage Genie	Supreme Regional Chancellor	
2026	Perfect		
2026	Primetime	Jim Christian	

=== Television ===
Year	Title	Role	Notes
1967	The Hollywood Palace	Himself (guest)	
1967–1969	American Bandstand	Himself (guest)	4 episodes
1969	It's Happening	Himself (guest)	Episode: "The Grassroots"
1969	Playboy After Dark	Himself (guest)	
1975	Kolchak: The Night Stalker	Man Entering Lab	Episode "Primal Scream"
1977	Quincy M.E.	Young Man	Episode "No Deadly Secret"
1977	Eight Is Enough	Merv	Episode "Mortgage Burnin' Blues"
1986	The Magical World of Disney	Court Clerk	Episode: "A Fighting Choice"
1987	U.S. Marshals: Waco & Rhinehart	Agent Jones	Television film
1994	Secret Sins Of The Father	Gas Station Worker	Television film
2003–2004; 2006	The Bernie Mac Show	Various	6 episodes
2005–2013	The Office	Creed Bratton	Recurring role (seasons 1–3); main cast (seasons 4–9); SAG Award for Outstanding Performance by an Ensemble in a Comedy Series (1); Nominated – SAG Award for Outstanding Performance by an Ensemble in a Comedy Series (5)
2007–2008	Today	Himself (guest)	2 episodes
2008	Celebrity Family Feud	Himself (guest)	Episode: "The Office vs. American Gladiators, Hickeys vs. Camden County"
2010	The Forgotten	Guy	Episode: "Double Doe"
2010	Funny or Die Presents	Himself	4 episodes
2012	Liz & Dick	Darryl Zanuck	Television film
2014	Adventure Time	Phlannel Boxingday	Episode: "Lemonhope Part Two"
2014	Franklin & Bash	Judge Patrick Semmer	Episode: "Kershaw v. Lincecum"
2014	Garfunkel and Oates	Kazoo Man	Episode: "Maturity"
2015	Comedy Bang! Bang!	Grandfather	Episode: "Ty Burrell Wears a Chambray Shirt & Clear Frame Glasses"
2015	Grace and Frankie	Seth	Episode: "The Bachelor Party"
2017	The New V.I.P.'s	Charlie	Television film
2019	Hello Realtor	Sal	Episode: "Pilot"
2019	Into the Dark	George Atwood	Episode: "Culture Shock"
2020	Upload	Rupert Tilford	Episode: "The Funeral"
2022	PBC	Randy	Episode: "Accountants love finding fraud and tacos"
2025	Smiling Friends	Father Frog	Episode: "Le Voyage Incroyable De Monsieur Grenouille"

=== Web ===
Year	Title	Role	Notes
2008	The Office: The Outburst	Creed Bratton	4 episodes
2009	The Office: Blackmail	Creed Bratton	4 episodes
2010	The Office: The Mentor	Creed Bratton	Episode: "Reimbursements"
2010	The Office: The 3rd Floor	Creed Bratton	Episode: "The Final Product"
2010	In Gayle We Trust	Denny Potter	2 episodes
2011	The Office: The Podcast	Creed Bratton	3 episodes
2012	Staged	Villain	Episode: "Gym Class Heroes"
2017	The New V.I.P.'s	Charlie	
2024	Tunnel Rave	Man in the Tree	

=== Video games ===
Year	Title	Role
2011	World Gone Sour	Narrator (voice)
2020	Call of Duty: Black Ops Cold War	Emerson Black (voice)

== Discography ==
=== Singles ===
Release date	Title	Flip side	Record Label	Chart Positions		
Release date	Title	Flip side	Record Label	US Billboard	US Cashbox	UK
1967	Let's Live for Today	Depressed Feeling	Dunhill	8	5	
1967	Things I Should Have Said	Tip Of My Tongue	Dunhill	23	36	
1967	Wake Up, Wake Up	No Exit	Dunhill	68	61	
1968	Melody For You	Hey Friend	Dunhill	123	120	
1968	Feelings	Here's Where You Belong	Dunhill		118	
1968	Midnight Confessions ++	Who Will You Be Tomorrow	Dunhill	5	5	
1968	Bella Linda	Hot Bright Lights	Dunhill	28	20	
1969	Melody For You	All Good Things Come To An End	Dunhill			
1969	Lovin' Things	You And Love Are The Same	Dunhill	49	35	
1969	The River Is Wide	(You Gotta) Live For Love	Dunhill	31	16	

++ – Gold Record – RIAA Certification

=== Albums ===
Release date	Title	Record Label	Chart Positions		
Release date	Title	Record Label	US Billboard	US Cashbox	UK
1967	Let's Live for Today	Dunhill	75	69	
1968	Feelings	Dunhill			
1968	Golden Grass ++	Dunhill	25	25	
1969	Lovin' Things	Dunhill	73	58	
2001	Chasin' The Ball	Kindred			
2001	The 80s	Kindred			
2002	Coarsegold	Kindred			
2008	Creed Bratton	Kindred			
2010	Bounce Back	Kindred			
2011	Demo	Kindred			
2018	While The Young Punks Dance	Alien Chicken			
2020	Slightly Altered	Alien Chicken			
2024	Tao Pop				

++ – Gold Record – RIAA Certification
