= Their 16 Greatest Hits =

Greatest hits album by the Grass Roots
- Released: September 1971
- Recorded: 1965–1971
- Genres: Pop rock, R&B
- Label: Dunhill
- Producers: Steve Barri, P. F. Sloan

The Grass Roots chronology
More Golden Grass (1970)	Their 16 Greatest Hits (1971)	Move Along (1972)

Professional ratings
Review scores
Source	Rating
Allmusic	4/5 stars

Their 16 Greatest Hits is the third compilation album by the American rock band the Grass Roots. It was originally released by Dunhill Records in September 1971 shortly after the success of "Sooner or Later" earlier that year (see 1971 in music). The album also included many other hit singles that were released from 1966 to 1971. The album was released on both stereo LP & tape as well as in Quadraphonic Sound on both LP & tape. This album was the only Quadraphonic album released by The Grass Roots.

== Songs ==
As the group's third greatest hits collection, Their 16 Greatest Hits contained many of the hit songs from the group's first two greatest hits albums, Golden Grass and More Golden Grass. This included six songs from the former and nine songs from the latter. The one song not on either previous album was "Sooner or Later," which had become the band's first Billboard top 10 entry since "Midnight Confessions" in 1968 and would be their last.

The songs on this release include three songs that reached the top 10 on the Billboard Hot 100, eleven that reached the top 40, and a total of fifteen songs that appeared on the chart.

== Artwork and packaging ==
The original release of Their 16 Greatest Hits on Dunhill ABC had a black label pressing with the Dunhill ABC Records logo on the top-center. The front and back cover photographs were taken by Tom Gundelfinger and the package was designed by Philip Schwartz. The same artwork and design was used on the versions of the album released by MCA Records in 1980, with only the label differing.

== Track listing ==
All songs produced by Steve Barri, except ^{X} produced by Steve Barri & P. F. Sloan.

Side one

1. "Sooner or Later" (Gary Zekley, Mitchell Bottler, Ekundayo Paris, Adeniyi Paris, Ted McNamara) – 2:37
2. "Where Were You When I Needed You"^{X} (P. F. Sloan, Steve Barri) – 2:59
3. "Heaven Knows" (Harvey Price, Dan Walsh) – 2:25
4. "Let's Live for Today"^{X} (Mogol, David Shapiro, Michael Julien) – 2:35
5. "Temptation Eyes" (Price, Walsh) – 2:40
6. "The River Is Wide" (Gary Knight, Billy Joe Admire) – 2:47
7. "Come On and Say It" (Dennis Provisor, Rob Grill, Warren Entner) – 2:38
8. "Midnight Confessions" (Lou T. Josie) – 2:42

Side two

1. "Wait a Million Years" (Zekley, Bottler) – 3:09
2. "Walking Through the Country" (Provisor) – 3:02
3. "Lovin' Things" (Artie Schroeck, Jet Loring) – 2:42
4. "Things I Should Have Said"^{X} (Sloan, Barri) – 2:30
5. "Bella Linda" (Mogol, Lucio Battisti, Barri, Barry A. Gross) – 2:47
6. "Baby Hold On" (Price, Walsh) – 2:42
7. "Feelings" (Rick Coonce, Entner, Kenny Fukomoto) – 2:50
8. "I Can Turn Off the Rain" (Provisor) – 3:09

== Personnel ==
According to the liner notes:

- Rob Grill – vocals, bass
- Dennis Provisor – vocals, piano, organ
- Warren Entner – guitar, organ, vocals
- Terry Furlong – guitar
- Rick Coonce – drums, percussion
- Creed Bratton – guitar, vocals
- Steve Barri – producer
- P. F. Sloan – producer, guitar, keyboards
- Phil Kaye – engineer
- Chuck Britz – engineer
- Jimmie Haskell – arrangements
- Sid Feller – arrangements
- Session musicians – various instruments

== Charts and certifications ==
Chart (1971)	Peak position
Canadian 100 Albums	34
US Billboard 200	58

Country	Provider	Certification (sales thresholds)
America	RIAA	Gold

== Release history ==
Region	Date	Label	Format	Catalog
United States	September 1971	Dunhill ABC	LP	DSX 50107
United States	September 1971	Dunhill/Ampex	8-track	M 85107
Canada	1980	MCA	LP	MCA-37154
Japan	unknown	Stateside	LP	HP-80388
