= Lovin' Things =

Studio album by the Grass Roots
- Released: March 1969
- Recorded: January 1969
- Studios: United Western, Hollywood, California
- Genres: Pop rock; sunshine pop
- Label: Dunhill
- Producer: Steve Barri

The Grass Roots chronology
Golden Grass (1968)	Lovin' Things (1969)	Leaving It All Behind (1969)

Singles from Lovin' Things
- 1. "Lovin' Things" Released: January 10, 1969; 2. "The River is Wide" Released: March 26, 1969

Professional ratings
Review scores
Source	Rating
Allmusic	1.5/5 stars

Lovin' Things is the fourth studio album by American rock group the Grass Roots. The album was originally released by Dunhill Records in 1969. The album charted at No. 73. It contained only two songs composed by the group. The album was intended to take the group into a soulful direction that was being rewarded by charting singles. The A- and B-side singles released were "Lovin' Things", "The River Is Wide", "(You Gotta) Live for Love" and "Fly Me to Havana". At the end of this run, "I'd Wait a Million Years" was released as an A side and became the group's next charting single, appearing on their next album, Leaving It All Behind.

== Songs ==
The songs featured unique horn punctuated touches by arranger Jimmie Haskell. The songs were written by outside composers, with the exception of two from the group songwriting team of Entner and Grill. This was a notable decrease in compositions by group members compared to their previous two studio albums, Let's Live for Today and Feelings, which contained four and seven group member penned tracks, respectively. Dunhill Records executives decided that since "Midnight Confessions" previously performed so well in the charts, they would take the group output in the same direction with the strong use of horns and wind instruments. A new soulful direction first surfaced on this album and continued on their next album, titled Leaving It All Behind. The group continued to move forward with multiple hit records until 1973. This is the last album with guitarist Creed Bratton, who left the group in early 1969. It is also the last album by the group to feature songs written by P.F. Sloan.

== Artwork, packaging ==
The original release of Lovin' Things is on Dunhill ABC as mono or stereo. The front cover designed by Philip Schwartz.

== Singles ==
Year	Titles	Peak chart positions			
Year	Titles	U.S. Billboard	U.S. Cash Box	Canada RPM Top Singles	Canada RPM Adult Contemporary
1969	"Lovin' Things"	49	35	24	–
1969	"The River Is Wide"	31	16	–	17

== Track listing ==
All songs produced by Steve Barri.

Side one
No.	Title	Writer(s)	Lead vocals	Length
1.	"Lovin' Things"	Artie Schroeck, Jet Loring	Grill	2:40
2.	"The River Is Wide"	Gary Knight, Billy Admire	Entner and Grill	2:30
3.	"(You Gotta) Live for Love"	Warren Entner, Rob Grill	Entner	2:10
4.	"City Women"	P.F. Sloan	Grill	2:54
5.	"What Love Is Made Of"	Elaine Simone	Entner	2:50
6.	"Pain"	Bob Mann	Grill	2:45

Side two
No.	Title	Writer(s)	Lead vocals	Length
1.	"I Get So Excited"	Derv Gordon, Eddy Grant	Entner	2:40
2.	"The Days of Pearly Spencer"	David McWilliams	Grill	2:30
3.	"Baby, You Do It So Well"	P.F. Sloan, Steve Barri	Entner	2:40
4.	"I Can't Help But Wonder, Elisabeth"	P.F. Sloan	Grill	4:05
5.	"Fly Me to Havana"	Warren Entner, Rob Grill	Entner	3:50

Online Streaming Bonus Tracks
No.	Title	Writer(s)	Lead vocals	Length
12.	"Midnight Confessions"	Lou Josie	Grill and Entner	2:44
13.	"Bella Linda"	Mogol, Lucio Battisti, Steve Barri, Barry A. Gross	Grill	3:07

== Personnel ==
The Grass Roots

- Rob Grill – vocals, bass
- Warren Entner – guitar, organ, vocals
- Creed Bratton – guitar, vocals
- Rick Coonce (Mr. Rhythm) – drums, percussion

Other personnel

- Steve Barri – producer
- Phil Kaye – engineer, thunder
- Jimmie Haskell – arrangements
- Session musicians: Hal Blaine, Joe Osborn, Larry Knechtel, Ben Benay, Mike Deasy
