= Golden Grass =

Greatest hits album by the Grass Roots
- Released: November 1968
- Genres: Folk rock, psychedelic pop, pop rock
- Label: Dunhill
- Producer: Steve Barri

The Grass Roots chronology
Feelings (1968)	Golden Grass (1968)	Lovin' Things (1969)

Professional ratings
Review scores
Source	Rating
AllMusic	3.5/5 stars

Golden Grass is the first greatest hits album by the American rock band the Grass Roots, released in November 1968 by Dunhill Records. The LP's release in the fall of 1968 followed the success of the group's highest-charting single, "Midnight Confessions". It featured a song written by Carole King and Toni Stern titled "Lady Pleasure", which was previously unreleased by the group, as well as a new single, "Bella Linda", which was originally written (in Italian, as "Balla Linda") by the Italian songwriting duo of Lucio Battisti and Mogol. The Grass Roots' version of the song, which was given English lyrics by Barry Gross and Steve Barri, charted at No. 28. Golden Grass is the highest charting Grass Roots album at #25, and was certified gold by the RIAA in 1970.

== Songs ==
Some of the songs included on Golden Grass feature unique touches by arranger Jimmie Haskell. The album showcases the Grass Roots' first two top ten singles, "Let's Live for Today" and "Midnight Confessions", both of which feature trade-off vocals by primary vocalists Warren Entner and Rob Grill. The rest of the songs, save for "Bella Linda" and the previously unreleased "Lady Pleasure", are drawn from the group's previous two albums, Let's Live for Today and Feelings. Among these are two original songs by the band's members. This album concludes the group's psychedelic period and phases them into their soulful transition shown on their following album, Lovin' Things.

"Bella Linda," "Midnight Confessions," and "Lady Pleasure" are previously unreleased on a Grass Roots album.

== Artwork, packaging ==
The original release of Golden Grass is on Dunhill ABC in stereo. Graphic design and art direction by Philip Schwartz.

== Track listing ==
All songs produced by Steve Barri. (*) produced with P. F. Sloan.

=== Side one ===
1. "Bella Linda" (Mogol, Battisti, Barri, Gross) – 2:47
2. "Things I Should Have Said" (*) (Sloan, Barri) (From Let's Live for Today) – 2:30
3. "Melody for You" (Sloan) (From Feelings) – 2:45
4. "Midnight Confessions" (Josie) – 2:42
5. "Here's Where You Belong" (Sloan, Barri) (From Feelings) – 3:10
6. "Feelings" (Coonce, Entner, Fukomoto) (From Feelings) – 2:50

=== Side two ===
1. "Lady Pleasure" (King, Stern) – 2:47
2. "Where Were You When I Needed You" (*) (Sloan, Barri) (From Where Were You When I Needed You) – 2:59
3. "Wake Up, Wake Up" (*) (Sloan, Barri) (From Let's Live for Today) – 2:50
4. "Hot Bright Lights" (Entner, Grill, Bratton) (from Feelings) – 5:07
5. "Let's Live for Today" (*) (Mogol, Shapiro, Julien) (From Let's Live for Today) – 2:35
