= Feelings (The Grass Roots album) =

Studio album by the Grass Roots
- Released: February 1968
- Recorded: December 1967
- Studios: United Western, Hollywood, California
- Genres: Folk rock; pop; psychedelic pop
- Length: 33:44
- Label: Dunhill
- Producer: Steve Barri

The Grass Roots chronology
Let's Live for Today (1967)	Feelings (1968)	Golden Grass (1968)

Professional ratings
Review scores
Source	Rating
Allmusic	3.5/5 stars

Feelings is the third studio album by the American rock band the Grass Roots, released in February 1968 by Dunhill Records. It contained many songs composed by the group's members and studio performances of the musician's instrumentation. The album was intended to take the group into a heavier psychedelic direction with their music. The A- and B-side singles released from the album were "Melody For You" b/w "Hey Friend", "Feelings" b/w "Here's Where You Belong", "Who Will You Be Tomorrow" (B-side of "Midnight Confessions"), "Hot Bright Lights" (B-side of "Bella Linda"), "All Good Things Come to an End" (B-side of 1969 issue of "Melody for You") and "You and Love Are the Same" (B-side of "Lovin' Things"). Midway during this run, "Midnight Confessions" was released as an A-side and became the group's highest charting single.

== Songs ==
The songs were a 50/50 split between outside composers and the group and featured arrangements by Jimmie Haskell. The title song was created in 1966 by the pre-Grass Roots garage group named the 13th Floor. Previous member Kenny Fukomoto was the main composer and Warren Entner and Rick Coonce helped with the arrangements. The song featured a sustained fuzz guitar and Eastern influences, giving it a psychedelic flavor.

This theme was continued with other group-composed songs. "Who Will You Be Tomorrow" contained references to George Harrison and other pop-culture themes, and "Hot Bright Lights" reflected the group's stage life. It featured an extended fuzzy lead guitar performance by Bratton segueing into the songs "Hey Friend" and "You And Love Are The Same", both written by Entner and Rob Grill.

Dunhill Records executives became dismayed by the inability of the single releases to chart at their time of release. They decided that since "Midnight Confessions" performed so well in the charts, they would issue the first greatest hits album, Golden Grass, which included the high-charting song. They then decided to take the group output into a new direction with a strong use of horns and wind instruments. A new soulful direction surfaced on their next regular album, titled Lovin' Things. The group continued to move forward with multiple hit records until 1973.

== Artwork, packaging ==
Feelings was originally released in February 1968 on the ABC Dunhill label in both mono and stereo. It was one of the label's last albums mixed in mono and one of the last commercially available mono albums, and today mono copies are scarce. The front cover was designed by Philip Schwartz.

== Track listing ==
All songs produced by Steve Barri.

Side one
No.	Title	Writer(s)	Lead vocals	Length
1.	"Feelings"	Rick Coonce, Warren Entner, Kenny Fukomoto	Grill and Entner	2:50
2.	"Here's Where You Belong"	P.F. Sloan, Steve Barri	Grill and Entner	3:10
3.	"The Sins of a Family Fall on the Daughter"	P.F. Sloan	Grill	3:00
4.	"Melody for You"	P.F. Sloan	Grill	2:45
5.	"Who Will You Be Tomorrow"	Warren Entner, Rob Grill	Entner	2:42
6.	"You Might as Well Go My Way"	Richard Podolor	Grill	2:03

Side two
No.	Title	Writer(s)	Lead vocals	Length
1.	"All Good Things Come to an End"	Albert Hammond	Grill	2:40
2.	"Hot Bright Lights"	Warren Entner, Rob Grill, Creed Bratton	Entner	5:07
3.	"Hey Friend"	Warren Entner, Rob Grill	Entner	2:58
4.	"You and Love Are the Same"	Warren Entner, Rob Grill	Entner and Grill	2:45
5.	"Dinner for Eight"	Creed Bratton	Bratton	3:00
6.	"Feelings (Reprise)"	Rick Coonce, Warren Entner, Kenny Fukomoto	Grill and Entner	0:59

== Personnel ==
The Grass Roots

- Rob Grill – vocals, bass
- Warren Entner – guitar, vocals
- Creed Bratton – lead guitar, vocals
- Rick Coonce – drums, percussion, vocals

Additional personnel

- Steve Barri – producer
- Chuck Britz – engineer
- Jimmie Haskell – arrangements, keyboard instruments
- Larry Knechtel – keyboard instruments
