= Where Were You When I Needed You =

Studio album by The Grass Roots
- Released: October 1966
- Genres: Folk rock, pop
- Labels: Dunhill (LP); Varèse Sarabande (CD 1994); Rev-Ola Records (CD 2005)
- Producers: P. F. Sloan, Steve Barri

The Grass Roots chronology
Where Were You When I Needed You (1966)	Let's Live for Today (1967)

Professional ratings
Review scores
Source	Rating
AllMusic	3.5/5 stars

Where Were You When I Needed You is the debut studio album by the American pop band the Grass Roots, released in October 1966 by Dunhill Records. Most of the album is performed by the songwriter/producer duo of P.F. Sloan and Steve Barri. Some of the album features members of a San Francisco band that became the first Grass Roots. The members who recorded are vocalist Willie Fulton and drummer Joel Larson. The A and B-side singles released are "Mr. Jones (Ballad of a Thin Man)", "You're a Lonely Girl", "Where Were You When I Needed You", "(These Are) Bad Times", "Only When You're Lonely", "This Is What I Was Made For", "Tip of My Tongue" and "Look Out Girl".

== Background ==
Sloan and Barri had written the song "Where Were You When I Needed You" for the Hermans Hermits film Hold On!. The Hermits chose not to release the song as the follow-up single to the Sloan and Barri song, "A Must to Avoid". Sloan and Barri persuaded their boss, Dunhill Records head Lou Adler, to let them record a single version of the song in 1965. The demo was sent to several radio stations in the Los Angeles area and received a favorable review. However, Dunhill insisted that they find a "real group" to tour as the Grass Roots, since they were too valuable to Dunhill as songwriters for the label to allow them to perform live concerts or make TV appearances.

Sloan and Barri chose the Bedouins, a San Francisco band, to become the Grass Roots. The band consisted of lead singer/lead guitarist Fulton, rhythm guitarist Denny Ellis, bassist David Stensen and drummer Larson. The band quickly had no shortage of live performances, as they became a resident band at the Los Angeles club The Trip and made frequent appearances at San Francisco's Avalon Ballroom. They also supported the Dunhill artists the Mamas and the Papas, Johnny Rivers and Barry McGuire in their TV performances. However, with the exception of Fulton's vocals and Larson on drums, they did not appear on the Grass Roots records, which featured Sloan and various session musicians.

The band's single version of Bob Dylan's "Ballad of a Thin Man" (issued under the name "Mr. Jones") only reached the lower reaches of the Billboard charts, peaking at No. 121 in late 1965. A new single of "Where Were You When I Needed You", with Fulton's voice replacing Sloan's as the lead vocal, was finally released in June 1966 and reached the top 40, peaking at No. 28. But that success was too late for the band members, who were frustrated by Dunhill's reluctance to let them record as a band. Although much of the first album had already been recorded at that time, the band (except for Larson) decided to return to San Francisco in early 1966.

After the band quit, Sloan once again took over as lead singer of the Grass Roots sessions, as he had been on the original demos. Sloan stated that Dunhill policy at the time required albums to include "other people's hits" that "they were trying to get into stores", which is why the album does not only feature Sloan and Barri originals. Because there was no longer a band for TV appearances or live concerts, Sloan and Barri were never able to continue the success of "Where Were You When I Needed You". The twelve track vinyl album featured four songs sung by Fulton (including the aforementioned version of "Where Were You When I Needed You"), six songs sung by Sloan, one song sung by Barri ("You Didn't Have to Be So Nice"), and one as a duet between Sloan and Barri ("I Am a Rock"). It failed to chart.

Fulton later was guitarist and vocalist in Tower of Power on their albums East Bay Grease (1970), Bump City (1972), Direct (1981) and Power (1987). Larson played with Gene Clark, the Merry-Go-Round, the Turtles and Lee Michaels before returning to the Grass Roots in 1971. Ellis and Stensen joined a San Francisco group named the Serpent Power led by Beat poet David Meltzer and his wife Tina. They released a self-titled album in 1967.

In 1994, the original CD version of the album was released on Varèse Sarabande. It included six bonus tracks. Five were sung by Fulton and one titled "Tip of My Tongue" by Sloan. This CD version of the album included a total of ten songs sung by Sloan and eight songs sung by Fulton. In 2005, an English CD reissue on Rev-Ola Records included all of the previous tracks plus two more bonus tracks. They were the second and third vocal versions of "Where Were You When I Needed You" sung by Fulton first and then by the most famous Grass Roots lead singer Rob Grill.

== Track listing ==
All songs written by P.F. Sloan and Steve Barri except as noted.

1. "Only When You're Lonely" – 3:09
2. "Look Out Girl" – 2:16
3. "Ain't That Lovin' You, Baby" (Jimmy Reed)** – 2:48
4. "I've Got No More to Say" – 2:47
5. "I Am a Rock" (Paul Simon) – 3:01
6. "Lollipop Train (You Never Had It So Good) " – 3:09
7. "Where Were You When I Needed You"** – 3:01
8. "You Didn't Have to Be So Nice" (John Sebastian, Steve Boone) – 2:19
9. "Tell Me" (Mick Jagger, Keith Richards)** – 3:24
10. "You Baby" – 2:20
11. "This Is What I Was Made For" – 2:22
12. "Mr. Jones (Ballad of a Thin Man)" (Bob Dylan)** – 2:54

=== CD Bonus Tracks (1994) ===
13. "You're a Lonely Girl"** – 2:21
14. "(These Are) Bad Times"** – 3:04
15. "Tip of My Tongue" – 2:32
16. "You've Got to Hide Your Love Away" (John Lennon, Paul McCartney)** – 2:50
17. "Hitch Hike" (Marvin Gaye, William "Mickey" Stevenson, Clarence Paul)** – 2:39
18. "Eve of Destruction" (P.F. Sloan)** – 3:35

=== Additional CD Bonus Tracks for the 2005 Rev-Ola Records Version ===
1. "Where Were You When I Needed You" (Second version, Single version, vocal by Willie Fulton)** – 3:01
2. "Where Were You When I Needed You" (Third version, sung by Rob Grill, from Let's Live for Today) – 2:59

=== Track order for 2005 Rev-Ola Records Version ===
1. "Only When You're Lonely" – 3:13
2. "Look Out Girl" – 2:18
3. "Ain't That Lovin' You Baby" – 2:50
4. "I've Got No More to Say" – 2:50
5. "I Am a Rock" – 3:04
6. "Lollipop Train (You Never Had It So Good)" – 3:12
7. "Where Were You When I Needed You" (First Version, vocal by P.F. Sloan) – 3:03
8. "You Didn't Have to Be So Nice – 2:22
9. "Tell Me" – 3:27
10. "You Baby" – 2:23
11. "This Is What I Was Made For" – 2:24
12. "Mr. Jones (Ballad of a Thin Man)" – 2:56
13. "You're a Lonely Girl" – 2:23
14. "Where Were You When I Needed You" (Second version, Single version, vocal by Willie Fulton) – 3:03
15. "(These Are) Bad Times" – 3:06
16. "Tip of My Tongue" – 2:34
17. "You've Got to Hide Your Love Away" – 2:53
18. "Hitch Hike" – 2:41
19. "Eve of Destruction" – 3:36
20. "Where Were You When I Needed You" (Third version, sung by Rob Grill, from Let's Live for Today)

== Personnel ==
- P.F. Sloan – lead and backing vocals, guitars, co-producer
- Steve Barri – lead and backing vocals, percussion, co-producer
- Willie Fulton – lead vocals on songs marked **
- Joel Larson – drums
- Bones Howe – drums
- Larry Knechtel – keyboards
- Session musicians – various instruments
