= Let's Live for Today (song) =

Single by The Grass Roots

from the album Let's Live for Today
- B-side: "Depressed Feeling"
- Released: May 13, 1967
- Recorded: 1967
- Genre: Psychedelic pop; folk rock
- Length: 2:35
- Label: Dunhill
- Songwriters: Michael Julien; Mogol; David Shapiro
- Producers: P. F. Sloan; Steve Barri

The Grass Roots singles chronology
"Tip of My Tongue" (1967)	"Let's Live for Today" (1967)	"Things I Should Have Said" (1967)

"Let's Live for Today" is a song written by David "Shel" Shapiro and Italian lyricist Mogol, with English lyrics provided by Michael Julien. It was first recorded, with Italian lyrics, under the title "Piangi con me" (translating as "Cry with Me") by the Italian-based English band the Rokes in 1966. Later, when "Piangi con me" was due to be released in the United Kingdom, publisher Dick James Music requested that staff writer Julien compose English lyrics for the song.

The song was popularized by the American rock band the Grass Roots, who released it as a single on May 13, 1967. The Grass Roots' version climbed to number 8 on the Billboard Hot 100 singles chart, eventually selling over two million copies and being awarded a gold disc. The song also became the title track of the Grass Roots' second album, Let's Live for Today. Since its initial release, the Grass Roots' rendition of the song has become a staple of oldies radio programming in America and is today widely regarded by critics as a 1960s classic.

== History ==
=== Early recordings ===
The song that would become "Let's Live for Today" was originally written by English musician David "Shel" Shapiro in 1966, with words by Italian lyricist Mogol and entitled "Piangi con me" (translating as "Cry with Me"). At the time, Shapiro was a member of the Rokes, an English beat music group who had relocated to Italy in 1963 and had signed a recording contract with RCA Italiana the following year. During the mid-1960s, the Rokes became a popular band on the Italian charts, achieving a number of top 20 hits with Italian-language cover versions of popular British and American songs. By 1966, however, the band had begun to write their own material, including "Piangi con me", which was released as the B-side of their Italian number three hit "Che colpa abbiamo noi" The vocals on the Rokes' original recording of "Piangi con me" were by the band's drummer Mike Shepstone, rather than Shapiro.

Plans were made to release "Piangi con me" in the United Kingdom and, as a result, Shapiro wrote English lyrics for the song under the title "Passing Thru Grey". However, the song's publisher in Britain, Dick James Music, was unhappy with these lyrics and decided that they should be changed. Michael Julien, a member of the publisher's writing staff, was assigned the task of writing new words for the song and came up with the title and concept of "Let's Live for Today". According to writer Andy Morten, the new lyrics "captur[ed] the era's zeitgeist of freedom and hedonism...". The Rokes' version was released by RCA Victor in April 1967, on the same day that a rival version by London band the Living Daylights was released on the Philips record label. Neither version reached the UK charts.

=== The Grass Roots' version ===
In the United States, the Rokes' version of "Let's Live for Today" found its way to the head of Dunhill Records, who felt that the song would make a suitable single release for the Grass Roots. The songwriting/production team of P. F. Sloan and Steve Barri, who managed the Grass Roots' recordings, were also enthusiastic about the song, with Sloan being particularly enamored with of the similarities that the song's chorus had with the Drifters' single "I Count the Tears". "Let's Live for Today" was recorded by the Grass Roots with the help of session musicians, including Sloan on lead guitar, and was released as a single in May 1967. The lead vocal on the Grass Roots' recording was sung by the band's bassist Rob Grill and the "1-2-3-4" count-in before the chorus was sung by guitarist Warren Entner.

The song quickly became popular with the American record buying public, selling over two million copies in the U.S. and finally peaking at number 8 on the Billboard Hot 100 during June 1967. As well as being popular with domestic American audiences, "Let's Live for Today" also found favor with young American men serving overseas in the Vietnam War, as music critic Bruce Eder of AllMusic has noted: "Where the single really struck a resonant chord was among men serving in Vietnam; the song's serious emotional content seemed to overlay perfectly with the sense of uncertainty afflicting most of those in combat; parts of the lyric could have echoed sentiments in any number of letters home, words said on last dates, and thoughts directed to deeply missed wives and girlfriends." Eder also described "Let's Live for Today" by the Grass Roots as "one of the most powerful songs and records to come out of the 1960s".

In addition to its appearance on the Grass Roots' Let's Live for Today album, the song also appears on several of the band's compilations, including Golden Grass, Their 16 Greatest Hits, Anthology: 1965–1975, and All Time Greatest Hits.

=== Other versions ===
Along with the Rokes, the Living Daylights, and the Grass Roots, the song has also been recorded by a number of other bands, including Tempest, the Lords of the New Church, the Slickee Boys, the dB's, and Dreamhouse. A version with different English lyrics was released in December 1966 by the Dutch band the Skope as "Be Mine Again". This version reached number 36 on the Dutch Top 40 chart. Chilean rock band Los Beat 4 recorded a Spanish-language version titled "Llora Conmigo", released in 1967. Yugoslav rock band Azra recorded a version of "Piangi con me" on their 1986 album It Ain't Like in the Movies at all.

== Uses in popular culture ==
The Grass Roots' recording of the song appears in the 1997 film Wild America and on its accompanying soundtrack album. A cover version by the Atomics appears in a 2017 TV commercial for H&M. The Grass Roots' version plays over the opening credits of the first season of Pachinko television series and the closing credits of the 2023 film The Last Stop in Yuma County.

== Personnel ==
Per 1972 reissue album liner notes and the Songfacts website, except when noted.

The Grass Roots

- Rob Grill – lead and backing vocals, bass guitar
- Warren Entner – co-lead and backing vocals, 12-string acoustic guitar
- Creed Bratton – backing vocals, guitar
- Rick Coonce – backing vocals, drums

Contributing musicians

- Guitar: P.F Sloan
- Bass: Bob Ray, Joe Osborn
- Keyboards: Larry Knechtel
- Drums: Hal Blaine
- Percussion: Bones Howe

== Chart performance ==
=== Weekly charts ===
Chart (1967)	Peak position
Canada RPM 100	3
New Zealand (Listener)	9
South Africa (Springbok Radio)	1
U.S. Billboard Hot 100	8
U.S. Cash Box Top 100	5

=== Year-end charts ===
Chart (1967)	Rank
Canada	79
South Africa	20
U.S. Billboard Hot 100	70
U.S. Cash Box	55
