= Sooner or Later (The Grass Roots song) =

Song by American rock band The Grass Roots

Single by The Grass Roots

from the album Their 16 Greatest Hits
- B-side: "I Can Turn Off the Rain"
- Released: May 1971
- Genre: Soft rock
- Length: 2:37
- Label: ABC/Dunhill
- Songwriters: Mitchell Bottler, Edward McNamara, Adeniyi Paris, Ekundayo Paris, Gary Zekley
- Producer: Steve Barri

The Grass Roots singles chronology
"Temptation Eyes" (1970)	"Sooner or Later" (1971)	"Two Divided by Love" (1971)

"Sooner or Later" is a 1971 hit song by The Grass Roots. It was released as a single and put on their third compilation album, Their 16 Greatest Hits. It reached number 9 on the US Billboard Hot 100, becoming their third and last top ten hit.

The single tells about a girl the narrator is in love with, but it's not mutual, because of her past experiences with love. He says that "sooner or later" she will succumb to love and give in to him.

Bassist and usual lead singer Rob Grill shared lead vocals with keyboardist Dennis Provisor. Excluding Provisor's organ, most of the instrumental backing were made by the Wrecking Crew.

The first two lines of the chorus of Johnny Lee's 1980 hit Country song Lookin' For Love is almost an exact word-for-word match of the first two lines of the bridge of this song.

== Chart performance ==
=== Weekly charts ===
Chart (1971)	Peak position
Australia KMR	95
Canada RPM Top Singles	13
US Billboard Hot 100	9
US Billboard Adult Contemporary	37
US Cash Box Top 100	12

=== Year-end charts ===
Chart (1971)	Rank
US (Joel Whitburn's Pop Annual)	88
US Cash Box Top 100	85

== GF4 version ==
"Sooner or Later"

Single by GF4
- Released: 17 October 1994
- Recorded: 1994
- Genre: Electronic, Euro-house
- Label: BMG Australia
- Songwriters: Gary Zekley; Mitchell Bottler; Ted McNamara; E. Paris; A. Paris

GF4 singles chronology
"Wishing on the Same Star" (1993)	"Sooner or Later" (1994)	"Need Love (To Make the Sex Right)" (1995)

Australian group GF4, formerly known as Girlfriend, released a cover version as a single in October 1994. The single peaked at number 11 on the ARIA Charts.

=== Track listing ===
BMG (768964 00032)
No.	Title	Length
1.	"Sooner or Later"
2.	"Sooner or Later" (Earth mix)
3.	"Sooner or Later" (Sugar mix)
4.	"Sooner or Later" (Cement mix)
5.	"Sooner or Later" (Mental mix)
6.	"Sooner or Later" (Percappella)

=== Charts ===
Chart (1994–95)	Peak position
Australia (ARIA)	11
