= Let's Live for Today (album) =

Studio album by the Grass Roots
- Released: July 1967
- Genres: Folk rock; psychedelic pop
- Length: 32:36
- Label: Dunhill
- Producers: P. F. Sloan, Steve Barri

The Grass Roots chronology
Where Were You When I Needed You (1966)	Let's Live for Today (1967)	Feelings (1968)

Professional ratings
Review scores
Source	Rating
Allmusic	4/5 stars

Let's Live for Today is the second studio album by the American rock band the Grass Roots, released in July 1967 by Dunhill Records. A new group was brought in for this album which included Creed Bratton, Rick Coonce, Warren Entner and Rob Grill. It features their first top-ten hit by the same name, "Let's Live for Today". The bulk of the compositions are by group creators Sloan and Barri, but the new group was allowed to compose four songs and was given some input in the studio instrumentation. The other A and B side singles released were "Depressed Feeling" (Non-LP B-side of "Let's Live for Today"), "Things I Should Have Said" b/w "Tip of My Tongue", and "Wake Up, Wake Up" b/w "No Exit". The album charted at No. 75.

== Songs ==
Unlike much of the group's later material, Let's Live for Today contains no horn or string arrangements. The songs reflected a new psychedelic direction for the group, but there are still folk elements throughout the record. The band was allowed some input of their compositions and instrumentation in the recordings. The songs "Tip of My Tongue" and "Where Were You When I Needed You" were the same recordings done with the previous group that Sloan and Barri hired as The Grass Roots, but with rerecorded vocals by the new lineup. The charting success of the album and its singles led to greater confidence in the new group's contributions by Dunhill. This led to even more input and a heavier direction in their psychedelic music for their next album titled Feelings.

== Artwork and packaging ==
The original release of Let's Live for Today is on Dunhill ABC as mono or stereo. The front cover was designed by Phil Schwartz.

Early US LP jackets list the song "Wake Up, Wake Up" before "Things I Should Have Said" on the back cover, though the label of the record lists them in the correct order.

== Track listing ==
All tracks are written by P.F. Sloan and Steve Barri, except where noted.

Side one
No.	Title	Writer(s)	Lead vocals	Length
1.	"Things I Should Have Said"		Grill	2:30
2.	"Wake Up, Wake Up"		Grill	2:50
3.	"Tip of My Tongue"		Grill	2:29
4.	"Is It Any Wonder"		Grill	2:42
5.	"Let's Live for Today"	Mogol, David Shapiro, Michael Julien	Grill and Entner	2:35
6.	"Beatin' Round the Bush"	Warren Entner, Creed Bratton	Entner	2:30

Side two
No.	Title	Writer(s)	Lead vocals	Length
1.	"Out of Touch"		Grill and Entner	2:50
2.	"Won't You See Me"	Warren Entner	Grill and Entner	2:56
3.	"Where Were You When I Needed You"		Grill	2:59
4.	"No Exit"	Warren Entner, Rob Grill, Creed Bratton	Grill	2:34
5.	"This Precious Time"		Bratton	3:01
6.	"House of Stone"	Creed Bratton	Entner	2:40

Online Streaming Bonus Tracks
No.	Title	Writer(s)	Lead vocals	Length
13.	"Depressed Feeling"	Warren Entner	Entner	2:32
14.	"A Melody For You"	P.F. Sloan	Grill	2:57

== Personnel ==
The Grass Roots

- Rob Grill – vocals, bass, composer
- Warren Entner – guitar, vocals, composer
- Creed Bratton – lead guitar, vocals, composer
- Rick Coonce – drums, percussion, Dixie Cup

Additional personnel

- Steve Barri – co-producer, composer
- P. F. Sloan – co-producer, composer, guitar, bass
- Chuck Britz – engineer
- "Bones" Howe – percussion
- Hal Blaine – drums, percussion
- Larry Knechtel – keyboard instruments
- Joe Osborn – guitar, bass
- Bobby Ray – guitar, bass
