= The Rokes =

Pop rock band

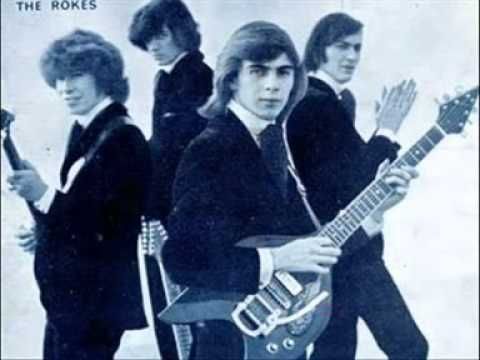
- The Rokes

Background information
- Also known as: The Shel Carson Combo
- Origin: London, England
- Genres: Beat music, pop rock
- Years active: 1963–1970
- Label: RCA/ARC
- Past members: "Shel" Shapiro; Mike Shepstone; Bobby Posner; Johnny Charlton
- Website: http://www.reocities.com/SunsetStrip/Lounge/3488/

The Rokes were a pop rock band formed in 1963 in Italy by English expatriates. Their most successful songs included "Piangi con me", the original version of "Let's Live for Today", a US hit when covered by The Grass Roots; and "Che colpa abbiamo noi", an Italian-language version of "Cheryl's Going Home" by Bob Lind.

== History ==
Norman David "Shel" Shapiro (born 16 August 1943, Stanmore, Middlesex) began performing in London, England, as a guitarist and singer with rock and roll band Rob Storm & the Whispers. After a spell playing in Gene Vincent's backing band during a tour of Great Britain in 1959, Shapiro decided to form his own band, The Shel Carson Combo, with guitarist Vic Briggs (14 February 1945, Twickenham, Middlesex – 25 June 2021), drummer Mike Shepstone (born 29 March 1943, Weymouth, Dorset), and bassist Bobby Posner (born 6 May 1945, Edgware, Middlesex).

The band performed rhythm and blues in clubs around London and had regular shows at American base camps around the south of England plus a couple of tours in the north including Scotland, before deciding to try their luck in the club scene in continental Europe. In January 1963, they travelled to then West Germany, where they had a residency at the Top Ten Club in Hamburg with a short stay at the Top Ten Club in Hanover. The group was then invited to tour Italy as the backing band for Colin Hicks, the brother of Tommy Steele. Briggs left the combo, preferring to stay in England, and was replaced by Johnny Charlton (born 3 April 1945, Walthamstow, London). The band toured around Italy with Hicks, increasingly performing more of their own material.

In June 1963, they broke their ties with Hicks and were signed up by Teddy Reno, the manager and husband of Italian pop singer Rita Pavone. They toured with Pavone, appearing as The Shel Carson Combo, warming up the fans before she did her show. Then the band gained a recording contract with the ARC record label and renamed themselves The Rokes for their first single, a cover version of Big Joe Turner's "Shake, Rattle and Roll": it was unsuccessful, but the group established themselves in a club residency at The Piper Club, in Rome. The Rokes also made a series of short commercials for the ice cream brand Algida, on Italian television. On later recordings, they sang mainly in English-accented Italian versions of American and British chart hits. In 1965, their version of Jackie DeShannon's "When You Walk in the Room" ("C'è una strana espressione nei tuoi occhi"), reached no. 11 on the Italian charts, followed by "Grazie a te", a cover of "I'm Alive" by The Hollies.

In 1966, the band was voted the second most popular beat music group in Italy, after having had further hits with versions of Bob Lind's songs "Cheryl's Going Home" ("Che colpa abbiamo noi") and "Remember The Rain" ("E la pioggia che va"). The B-side of "Che colpa abbiamo noi" was a song that Shapiro co-wrote with Italian lyricist Mogol, "Piangi con me" ("Cry with Me" in English). The group re-recorded the song in English as "Let's Live for Today", with lyrics by Michael Julien of Dick James Music. Worldwide sales of "Piangi con me" exceeded one million copies, qualifying the record for a gold disc. The single was released in England at the same time as a cover version by another English band was done, The Living Daylights. Then the song was heard by American record producers P. F. Sloan and Steve Barri, and successfully recorded by them with The Grass Roots, an American group.

The Rokes released four albums between 1965 and 1968, and continued to record successfully in Italy. The band also toured and appeared regularly on Italian TV shows and in several editions of the annual Sanremo Music Festival. The group also ventured into psychedelic rock in 1968 with "Il vento" (written by Mogol and Lucio Battisti), also recorded in English as "When the Wind Arises", with lyrics by Mike Shepstone. Then they also recorded a version of The Equals' UK hit "Baby, Come Back" ("Non c'è pace per me"). However, their records had little success outside Italy due to RCA/ARC's lack of publicity. With changing tastes and declining sales, the group disbanded in 1970, having sold more than five million records.

== Later activities ==
Shapiro continued to compose and perform his own music. He recorded seven albums and embarked on an acting career, working with directors such as Mario Monicelli and Marco Risi. In 1977 he founded his own label in Milan. In 2018 he recorded an album with former rival and Equipe 84 lead vocalist Maurizio Vandelli. Johnny Charlton opened his own art gallery, Galleria Charlton, in Rome. He now works as a visual artist. Bobby Posner and Mike Shepstone initially returned to England. Posner bought various pubs in London and eventually sold these and moved to Hastings where he acquired other music pubs. He continues to perform in various rock, reggae, and blues bands. Mike Shepstone formed the duo 'Shepstone and Dibbens', toured with AC/DC and continued to write songs for other artists. In 2000, serious discussions about putting the band back together for an Italian tour gained momentum. However, Shapiro and Charlton weren't interested, so Posner and Shepstone decided to form The Rokes M&B (Mike and Bobby). They have been playing regularly in Italy since 2000. In 2013 Posner moved permanently back to Italy and now lives with his fiancée Paola Salvadeo in Novi Ligure (AL).

== Discography ==
=== Albums ===
- 1965 – The Rokes (ARC, SA 4)
- 1966 – The Rokes vol. 2 (ARC, SA 8)
- 1966 – Che mondo strano (ARC, SA 15)
- 1968 – The Rokes (ARC, ALPS 11006)

=== Singles ===
Title	Year	Peak chart positions
Title	Year	IT
"Shake and Rattle" b/w "Quando eri con me"	1964	—
"Un'anima pura" b/w "She Asks of You"	1965	—
"C'è una strana espressione nei tuoi occhi" b/w "Ci vedremo domani"	1965	11
"Grazie a te" b/w "La mia città"	1966	12
"Ascolta nel vento" b/w "Il primo sintomo"	1966	—
"Che colpa abbiamo noi" b/w "Piangi con me"	1966	3
"È la pioggia che va" b/w "Finché c'è musica mi tengo su"	1966	1
"Bisogna saper perdere" b/w "Non far finta di no"	1967	4
"Eccola di nuovo" b/w "Ricordo quando ero bambino"	1967	— 8
"Let's Live for Today" b/w "Ride On"	1967	—
"Cercate di abbracciare tutto il mondo come noi" b/w "Regency Sue"	1967	12
"Hold My Hand" b/w "Regency Sue"	1967	—
"Le opere di Bartolomeo" b/w "Siamo sotto il sole"	1968	15
"Lascia l'ultimo ballo per me" b/w "Io vivrò senza te"	1968	16
"The Works of Bartholomew" b/w "When the Wind Rises"	1968	—
"Qui non c'è nessuno" b/w "La luna è bianca, la notte è nera"	1968	—
"Baby Come Back" b/w "Hello, come stai"	1968	—
"Ma che freddo fa" b/w "Per te, per me"	1969	—
"28 giugno" b/w "Mary"	1969	23
"Ombre blu" b/w "Sempre giorno"	1969	—
"—" denotes releases that did not chart or were not released in that territory.
