= The River Is Wide =

1967 single by The Forum

Single by the Forum
- Released: May 1967
- Genre: Sunshine pop
- Length: 2:44
- Label: London (UK), Mira (US)
- Songwriters: Billy Admire, Gary Knight
- Producer: Norm Ratner

The Forum singles chronology
""The River Is Wide"; Penthouse PH-504"	"The River Is Wide"	""Trip On Me"; Mira 243"

"The River Is Wide" was a song written by Billy Admire and Gary Knight and was originally recorded by the Forum in 1967.

== Background ==
=== The Forum ===
The record was first released in 1966 on the Penthouse label. It did not go anywhere and after being re-mastered and re-edited, it was released a second time in May 1967, this time on the Mira label. Nothing happened the second time. Then Decca got hold of the master. The record then started to make some progress in the UK, which got the attention of a DJ in Seattle. He started playing it and it started attracting attention in Seattle. By July 1967, the record was at no. 88 in the Billboard charts. It finally got to no. 45.

=== Bobby Rydell ===
By May 1968, Bobby Rydell had a version of the single out on the Reprise label. It was produced by Dave Hassinger. The B side, "Absence Makes The Heart Grow Fonder", was arranged by Artie Butler.

=== The Grass Roots ===
"The River Is Wide"

Single by the Grass Roots

from the album Lovin' Things
- B-side: "(You Gotta) Live For Love"
- Released: 1969
- Recorded: 1969
- Genre: Soft rock
- Length: 2:30
- Label: Dunhill
- Songwriters: Billy Admire, Gary Knight
- Producer: Steve Barri

The Grass Roots singles chronology
"Lovin' Things" (1969)	"The River Is Wide" (1969)	"I'd Wait A Million Years" (1969)

It became a hit for American rock band the Grass Roots. In April 1969, their version of "The River Is Wide" entered the Billboard Hot 100 chart at no. 87, and by May, it had reached its peak position at no. 31. The song appeared on their studio album Lovin' Things, which was released the same year. It later appeared on the band's compilation albums More Golden Grass and Their 16 Greatest Hits, which were released in 1970 and 1971 respectively. The song has also been included on multiple subsequent compilations by the group. The single version does not contain the thunder present at the beginning of the LP version, and is also in a different key.

== Releases ==
=== United States ===
List of singles
Act	Title	Catalogue	Year	Notes
The Forum	"The River Is Wide" / " Fall In Love (All Over Again)"	Penthouse PH-504	1966	Released Aug 1966
The Forum	"The River Is Wide" / "I Fall In Love (All Over Again)"	Mira 232	1966	Released Dec 1966
The Forum	"The River Is Wide" / "Girl Without A Boy"	Mira 232	1967	
Bobby Rydell	"The River Is Wide" / "Absence Makes The Heart Grow Fonder"	Reprise 0684	1968	
The Grass Roots	"The River Is Wide" / "(You Gotta) Live For Love"	Dunhill 45–4187	1969	
The Grass Roots	"The River Is Wide" / "I'd Wait A Million Years"	Goldies 45 D-1439		
