= Hold On! (film) =

1966 musical film directed by Arthur Lubin

- Official US movie poster
- Directed by: Arthur Lubin
- Screenplay by: Robert E. Kent (credited as "James B. Gordon")
- Produced by: Sam Katzman
- Starring: Peter Noone; Shelley Fabares; Sue Ane Langdon; Herbert Anderson; Bernard Fox
- Cinematography: Paul C. Vogel
- Edited by: Ben Lewis; Alex Beaton
- Music by: Fred Karger (score); Herman's Hermits (songs)
- Production company: Four Leaf Productions
- Distributed by: Metro-Goldwyn-Mayer
- Release dates: April 1, 1966 (Los Angeles); August 12, 1966 (United Kingdom)
- Running time: 85 minutes
- Country: United States
- Language: English

Hold On! is a 1966 American musical film directed by Arthur Lubin and starring Peter Noone, Shelley Fabares, Herbert Anderson, and Sue Ane Langdon. The film features performances by Herman's Hermits and stars the band as fictionalized versions of themselves. The soundtrack was released as an album, also called Hold On!.

== Plot ==
When the children of American astronauts choose "Herman's Hermits" as the "good luck name" of the next Gemini space capsule, NASA scientist Edward Lindquist is sent by U.S. State Department official Colby Grant to shadow the band on tour. His orders are to find out all he can about them to stave off a "P.R. nightmare". (Grant fears that putting the band's name on the rocket will make the world think the U.S. is "still a colony of Great Britain".)

Aspiring starlet Cecilie Bannister hires a publicity agent and photographer to take photos of her with Herman and the band, sure that this publicity boost will get her a new contract with a movie studio. They take an unflattering picture during a riot of teenage girls at Los Angeles International Airport but the misleading story in the newspapers leads Lindquist to believe that Bannister is an "old friend" of Herman's. Likewise, Bannister believes that Lindquist is a writer and part of the band's entourage as they pump each other for information about the band that neither of them really has.

Herman and his bandmates, mobbed wherever they appear, are sequestered in their rooms at the Miramar Hotel by their manager, Dudley, in advance of a charity benefit performance. Herman sees teens playing on the beach and wishes he could be one of them, meet the girl of his dreams, and fall in love. Mrs. Page, the benefit organizer, introduces Herman to her daughter, Louisa, who offers to show him the sights of Los Angeles. Denied by Dudley, Herman and the Hermits sneak off to Pacific Ocean Park where they split up, reasoning correctly that if they don't stick together, nobody will recognize them. Herman finds Louisa and falls in love while the other band members explore the park. Believing that the boys have been kidnapped, Dudley calls in the police.

Lindquist and Herman meet up again on the roller coaster and the scientist realizes than Bannister has been feeding him false information. Cleared of the kidnapping charges, Lindquist comes clean to the band about his mission and they arrange to have Grant see the band perform at the charity benefit. When teens overrun the country club, the mayhem convinces Grant to cancel the rocket naming but nationwide teen protests force NASA to name the capsule "Herman's Hermits". During a climactic concert for 50,000 fans at the Rose Bowl, the band is whisked by hypersonic jet to Cape Kennedy for the rocket launch and back in time to finish the concert and play one more song before the credits roll.

== Cast ==
- Peter Noone (credited onscreen as "Peter Blair Noone") is Herman, the leader of Herman's Hermits, a real-life English rock band comparable in popularity at the time to The Beatles. While forced to take elaborate security procedures to avoid being "torn apart" by mobs of teenaged fans, Herman laments that he has nobody to talk to and dreams of meeting a woman who will love him for himself.
- Karl Green (as Karl), Keith Hopwood (as Keith), Derek Leckenby (as Derek), and Barry Whitwam (as Barry) are the other four real-life members of Herman's Hermits. Playing supporting roles to Herman, they too wish to see America up close instead of just through a window. All five band members play fictionalized versions of themselves.
- Herbert Anderson plays Ed Lindquist, a NASA scientist with a nervous nature who is assigned to follow the band across the country by State Department official Colby Grant (Harry Hickox) to determine whether the U.S. can name a Gemini space capsule after the band. Lindquist is initially opposed to the assignment and even faints during his first encounter with the band. He grows to like and accept the young rockers as being "like boys anywhere" and supports the effort to name the capsule for them.
- Sue Ane Langdon plays Cecilie Bannister, an actress whose studio contract has expired. She believes that associating herself with Herman's Hermits will give her enough publicity to get a new contract and more acting jobs. To this end, she hires a publicity man (Mickey Deems) and his photographer (Phil Arnold) while devising ever more elaborate schemes to get close to the band.
- Shelley Fabares plays Louisa Page, daughter of Mrs. Page (Hortense Petra), a young woman for whom Herman falls in love at first sight. Louisa convinces her mother to have Herman's Hermits play at a charity benefit.
- Bernard Fox plays Dudley, the band's (fictional) manager. He seeks to protect these young men both from the public and from themselves but the band chafes under his strict control. Louisa inspires Herman to lead the band's escape from their hotel which begins to tie the movie's three main plotlines together.

== Production info ==
Hold On!, largely an excuse to string together performances by Herman's Hermits, stars the band as themselves on tour across the United States. The band had already appeared in a film for MGM produced by Sam Katzman, When the Boys Meet the Girls. Katzman decided to put the band in their own film.

The Beatles and The Dave Clark Five had already appeared in films. Peter Noone later joked, "where we jumped out of the loop was…the Beatles ran away from girls and the Dave Clark Five ran away from girls, but we slowed down for the really sexy ones. So we set a new standard for British rock bands!"

The film began production as There's No Place Like Space. James B Gordon was signed to write the script in August 1965. Filming started in September 1965.

The film's name was changed to A Must to Avoid and songwriter P. F. Sloan was commissioned to write a theme song in less than two days. He completed the song and it appears in the film but the studio, realizing the negative connotation of calling a movie A Must to Avoid, then changed the movie's name to Hold On!. Sloan wrote that title song as well. Noone said "so they wrote a scene, basically, where I was on a rollercoaster and where I would hold on. D’you see what I mean? It sounds like wild, wacky stuff, but it was all real!"

Noone later said Lubin "was the real thing... He was amazing. And he was a real gentleman. He gave us all kinds of good advice. I was already an actor – I’d already gone through acting school and stuff like that – but none of the others had. They were just thrown into the deep end. And he gave them time to be…themselves, basically."

Lubin estimated the movie was made in 18 days. He called the movie "very simple, it had a lot of music which I didn't care very much for. I don't know how successful it was."

A total of eleven songs - nine sung by Herman's Hermits, one by Shelley Fabares, and one by a chorus of uncredited girls - appear in the film. Noone:

We had total control over the songs, and we just did mad stuff. They said, “What song do you want to sing in the spaceship?” And we said, “Leaning on a Lamppost.” It’s just odd, really, that we would go there. But Arthur Lubin went with it. He thought, “Well, I guess they know what they’re doing, these guys.” They didn’t realize that we didn’t just look 16, we were 16. We weren’t actors! But they let us do just about whatever we wanted.

A ten-song soundtrack album was released by MGM Records in the U.S. and Canada and a six-song EP in the United Kingdom by Columbia/EMI.

The film was shot in Metrocolor with the Panavision photographic process at a 2.35:1 aspect ratio. The film's theatrical soundtrack is monaural.

== Songs ==
- "Hold On" - Written by P.F. Sloan - Performed by Herman's Hermits
- "A Must To Avoid" - Written by P.F. Sloan and Steve Barri - Performed by Herman's Hermits
- "Leaning On The Lamp Post" - Written by Noel Gay (misnamed Noel Tay in the opening credits) - Performed by Herman's Hermits
- "All The Things I Do For You, Baby" - Written by P.F. Sloan and Steve Barri - Performed by Herman's Hermits
- "Where Were You When I Needed You" - Written by P.F. Sloan and Steve Barri - Performed by Herman's Hermits
- "Make Me Happy" - Written by Fred Karger, Sid Wayne, Ben Weisman - Performed by Shelley Fabares
- "The George and Dragon" - Written by Fred Karger, Sid Wayne, Ben Weisman- Performed by Herman's Hermits
- "Got A Feeling" - Written by Fred Karger, Sid Wayne, Ben Weisman - Performed by Herman's Hermits
- "We Want You, Herman" - Written by Fred Karger, Sid Wayne, Ben Weisman
- "Wild Love" - Written by Fred Karger, Sid Wayne, Ben Weisman - Performed by Herman's Hermits
- "Gotta Get Away" - Written by Fred Karger, Sid Wayne, Ben Weisman

== Reception ==
=== Critical reception ===
When the film was initially released, the Los Angeles Times said it "lets loose the bright presence of Herman's Hermits on the wide screen" but opined that "their high spirits have been cut down to fit producer Sam Katzman's trite formula for teen-age entertainment". The New York Times called the film "an occasionally amusing but nonsensical pastiche" that served "as the cement to hold together the song sequences of Herman's Hermits".

Other contemporary reviewers were more forgiving, with The Film Daily calling Hold On! a "fun and frolic in a formula vein" with the presence of Herman's Hermits making of "a foregone boxoffice win" with "youngsters". Boys' Life described the film as only for "swingers who are really with it".

In December 2000, the Denver Post described the band as "a Backstreet Boys for their time" in an article titled "Not quite like Hard Day's Night". An April 2010 review in the Boston Globe noted that The Beatles in A Hard Day's Night and Help! made getting a "British Invasion band to play themselves in a movie with a made-up story" look "so easy" that MGM believed that Herman's Hermits could share similar success but that with Hold On! the "only similarity to Help! is the exclamation mark".

Diabolique magazine said "Shelley Fabares is wasted and the film’s quality is a long way from A Hard Day’s Night... but it is full of high spirits and features eleven Herman’s Hermits tunes."

=== Home media ===
The film was broadcast nationally on August 21, 1970, as part of the CBS Friday Night Movie series.

For many years, the film was not available on home video in the United States. Turner Classic Movies (TCM) ranked the demand for Hold On! as #380 on the TCM Not-On-Home Video list. While TCM does broadcast the film once or twice a year, in September 2010 USA Today described the film as "rarely seen". The film was finally made available on DVD in 2011 through the Warner Archive Collection.

== See also ==
- List of American films of 1966
