= Balla Linda =

1968 song by Lucio Battisti

Single by Lucio Battisti
- Released: 20 April 1968
- Recorded: 1968
- Genre: Baroque pop
- Length: 3:08
- Label: Dischi Ricordi
- Songwriters: Lucio Battisti, Mogol

Audio
- "Balla Linda" on YouTube

"Balla Linda" is a song by Italian musician Lucio Battisti released on 20 April 1968 With this song Battisti participated in the Cantagiro 1968 where he obtained a good success.

== Writing ==
Music and lyrics to the song were written by Italian songwriter Mogol and Battisti. The track is a pop song with lyrics and atmosphere recalling the lightheartedness of Summer. The text speaks of a girl named Linda. She is neither beautiful, intelligent nor bewitching, but her carelessness, sincerity and fidelity manage to make the protagonist forget his former companion, who had taken advantage of him and then left him.

The text is structured on a climax: the words of the first strophes of the song are melancholic and list some negatives sides of Linda, contrasted with the positive sides of the previous companion. In the following verses, the defects of the latter surface.

Finally in the refrain, the protagonist, who is obviously happy with her choice, dedicates the whole scene to Linda and invites her to dance with enthusiasm.

== Reception ==
According to music critic Renzo Stefanel, Linda «is so pure that her dance seems almost [...] the metaphor of the lightness of life coined by Nietzsche».

== Track listing ==
- "Prigioniero del mondo/Balla Linda" – 45 rpm single (Dischi Ricordi (SRL 10495)) – 1968
1. "Prigioniero del mondo" (Battisti, Carlo Donida) – 3:28
2. "Balla Linda" (Lucio Battisti, Mogol) – 3:08

== The Grass Roots' cover ==
"Bella Linda"

Single by The Grass Roots

from the album Golden Grass
- B-side: "Hot Bright Lights"
- Released: November 1968
- Recorded: 1968 in Los Angeles, California
- Genre: Pop rock, baroque pop
- Length: 2:47
- Label: Dunhill
- Songwriters: Lucio Battisti, Mogol, Steve Barri, Barry Gross
- Producer: Steve Barri

The Grass Roots singles chronology
"Midnight Confessions" (1968)	"Bella Linda" (1968)	"Melody for You" (1969)

In the autumn of 1968, a few months after Battisti's release, the song was noted by American producer Steve Barri, who decided to make a version in English and have it performed by the Californian group The Grass Roots. The English version took the title of "Bella Linda"; new lyrics were written by Barri together with Barry Gross, while the orchestral arrangement was done by Jimmie Haskell. "Bella Linda" was released in the United States in November 1968 as the A side of the single Bella Linda / Hot Bright Lights (Some pressings are misprinted as "Della Linda"). It was included on the album Golden Grass, as well as many subsequent compilations. In January 1969, the single was released in Great Britain, Canada and Australia. It made #28 on the Billboard Hot 100. On the New Zealand Listener Charts it made it to #11.
