= Where Were You When I Needed You (song) =

1965 song by P. F. Sloan and Steve Barri

Song by Jan and Dean

from the album Folk 'n Roll
- Released: November 1965
- Recorded: 1965
- Studio: Western Recorders (Hollywood, California)
- Length: 2:48
- Label: Liberty
- Songwriters: P. F. Sloan; Steve Barri
- Producer: Jan Berry for Screen Gems, Inc.

Official audio
- "Where Were You When I Needed You" on YouTube

"Where Were You When I Needed You"

Song by Herman's Hermits

from the album Hold On!
- Released: March 1966
- Length: 2:45
- Label: MGM
- Songwriters: P.F. Sloan; Steve Barri
- Producer: Mickie Most

"Where Were You When I Needed You"

Single by The Grass Roots

from the album Where Were You When I Needed You
- B-side: "(These Are) Bad Times"
- Released: 1966
- Length: 3:02
- Label: Dunhill
- Songwriters: P.F. Sloan; Steve Barri
- Producers: Sloan; Barri

The Grass Roots singles chronology
"Only When You're Lonely" (1966)	"Where Were You When I Needed You" (1966)	"Tip of My Tongue" (1966)

Official audio
- "Where Were You When I Needed You" on YouTube

"Where Were You When I Needed You" is a 1965 song by P. F. Sloan and Steve Barri.

== Jan and Dean version ==
On September 23, 1965, Jan and Dean's version of the song was tracked at Western Recorders in Hollywood. George Tipton arranged the track. Further tracking work took place on September 26. Jan Berry, Dean Torrence, Tipton, and Steve Barri added vocals on September 29. Berry, Torrence, and Tipton participated in another vocal session for the song the following day. Mark A. Moore also notes that P.F. Sloan provided vocals for the track. In November, the song was released on Jan and Dean's Folk 'n Roll album, where it appeared as the last track of side one.

== Herman's Hermits version ==
=== Release and reception ===
Herman's Hermits' version of "Where Were You When I Needed You" appeared on the soundtrack album for the film Hold On!. In the UK, it appeared on a six-track EP featuring songs from the film, as well as on the group's second British album Both Sides of Herman's Hermits. Joe Viglione of AllMusic described Herman's Hermits' version of the song as "a great party cut, much different from the Grass Roots' hit".

== The Grass Roots version ==
=== Release and reception ===
Billboard gave the Grass Roots' version a positive review, noting that it was given a "rousing, big beat treatment by the exciting group". Cash Box's review of the song called it a "[h]arsh ditty in a groovy folk-rock bag". In a retrospective review, Matthew Greenwald of AllMusic called the song "a buoyant slice of mid-'60s folk-rock".

=== Charts ===
Chart (1966)	Peak position
Canada RPM 100	12
US Billboard Hot 100	28
US Cash Box Top 100	33
