= The Grass Roots =

American rock band

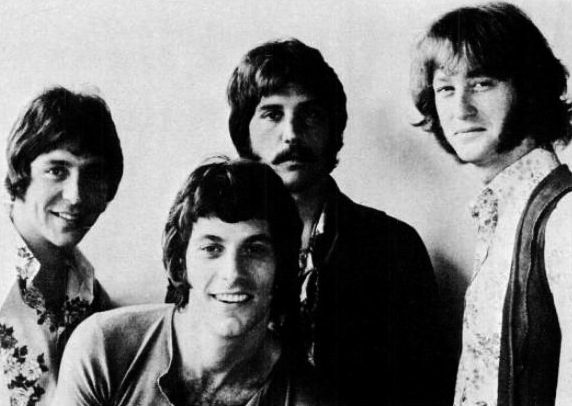
- The Grass Roots in 1969; Left to right: Dennis Provisor, Warren Entner, Rob Grill and Rick Coonce

Background information
- Origin: Los Angeles, California, U.S.
- Genre: Folk rock • blue-eyed soul • psychedelic pop • pop rock • sunshine pop
- Years active: 1965–present
- Labels: Dunhill, ABC, Haven, MCA, Gusto, RFG, Cleopatra
- Members: Dusty Hanvey; Larry Nelson; Joe Dougherty; Mark Dawson
- Past members: See Members

The Grass Roots are an American rock band that charted frequently between 1965 and 1975. The band was originally the creation of Lou Adler and songwriting duo P. F. Sloan and Steve Barri. In their career, they achieved two gold albums and two gold singles, and charted singles on the Billboard Hot 100 a total of 21 times. Among their charting singles, they achieved Top 10 three times, Top 20 six times and Top 40 14 times. They have sold over 20 million records worldwide.

Until his death in 2011, early member Rob Grill and a newer lineup of the Grass Roots continued to play many live performances each year. After his death, the group featured no original band members, with a lineup personally chosen by Grill carrying on the legacy of the group with nationwide live performances.

== The founding years ==
The name "Grass Roots" (originally spelled as one word "Grassroots") originated in mid-1965 as the name of a band project by Los Angeles songwriter and producer duo P.F. Sloan and Steve Barri. Sloan and Barri had written several songs in an attempt by their record company, Dunhill Records (owned by Lou Adler), to cash in on the budding folk rock movement. One of these songs was "Where Were You When I Needed You", which was recorded by Sloan and Barri. Sloan provided the lead vocals and played guitar, Larry Knechtel played keyboards, Joe Osborn played the bass and Bones Howe was on drums. The song was released under "The Grass Roots" name and sent, as a demo, to several radio stations of the San Francisco Bay area.

When moderate interest in this new band arose, Sloan and Barri went to look for a group that could incorporate the Grass Roots name. They found one in The Bedouins, a San Francisco band that won a Battle of the Bands at a Teenage Fair in San Mateo, California. A new version of "Where Were You When I Needed You" with that band's lead vocalist, Willie Fulton (later, an early member of Tower of Power), was recorded.

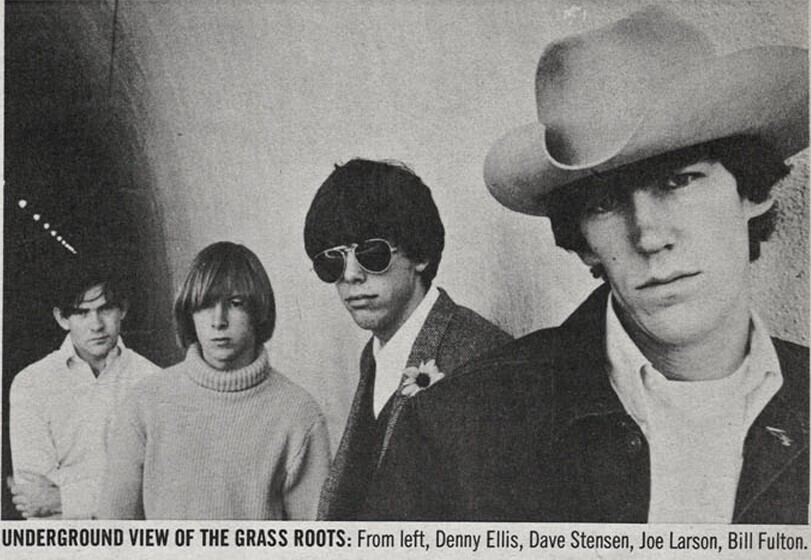
The Grass Roots in late 1965

In late 1965, the Grass Roots got their first official airplay on Southern California radio stations, such as KGB (AM) in San Diego and KHJ in Los Angeles, with a version of the Bob Dylan song "Mr. Jones (Ballad of a Thin Man)". Dylan granted Sloan permission to cover "Ballad of a Thin Man".

For some months, the group appeared as the first "real" Grass Roots. They were used by Dunhill to back up The Mamas & the Papas and Barry McGuire and became a house band at The Trip nightclub in Hollywood. The partnership with Sloan and Barri broke up when the band demanded more space for their own more blues rock-oriented material (which Dunhill was not willing to give them). Willie Fulton (lead vocals, guitar), Denny Ellis (guitar, backing vocals) and David Stensen (bass, backing vocals) went back to San Francisco, with drummer Joel Larson being the only one who remained in Los Angeles (he later returned to the group in 1972). Fulton, Ellis and Stensen continued to appear as the Grass Roots, with original Bedouins drummer Bill Shoppe, until Dunhill ordered them to cease, because the label decided to start all over again with another group, whom they would groom to be the Grass Roots. In the meantime, the second version of "Where Were You When I Needed You" peaked in the Top 40 in mid-1966, while an album of the same name sold poorly.

Still looking for a group to record their material and promote it with live dates, Sloan and Barri in 1966 offered Wisconsin-based band The Robbs (for whom they produced some early material) a chance to assume the identity of the Grass Roots, but the group declined.

== Peak years ==
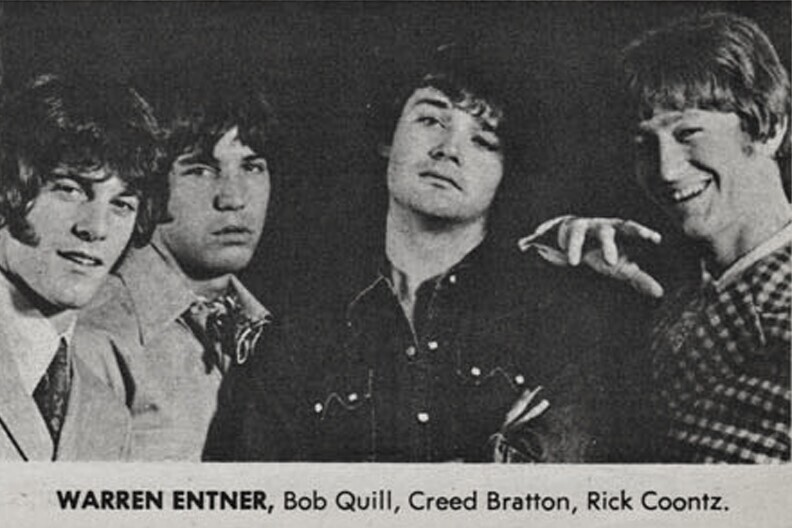
The Grass Roots in 1967

The group's third – and by far most successful – incarnation was finally found in a Los Angeles band called The 13th Floor (not to be confused with the 13th Floor Elevators). This band consisted of Creed Bratton (vocals, guitar), Rick Coonce (drums, percussion), Warren Entner (vocals, guitar, keyboards) and Kenny Fukumoto (vocals, bass) and had formed only a year earlier. Entner, who had been attending film school at UCLA alongside future The Doors members Jim Morrison and Ray Manzarek, was drifting through Europe in the summer of 1965 singing and playing on street corners when he met fellow American busker Creed Bratton in Israel, where an Israeli businessman expressed interest in managing and promoting them. The duo moved on individually, though, and ended up back in LA by 1966, where they formed the 13th Floor and submitted a demo tape to Dunhill Records. After Fukumoto was drafted into the army, the group went through two replacements before the label found singer Rob Grill, who had a voice that P.F. Sloan regarded as the perfect vehicle to convey his songs in a more commercially accessible manner than Sloan could with his own singing. Grill only played guitar, but had to quickly learn the rudiments of bass to fill that vacancy in the lineup. In 1967 the band was offered the choice to go with their own name or choose to adopt a name that had already been heard of nationwide.

In the beginning, they were one of many U.S. guitar pop/rock bands, but with the help of Barri and their other producers, they developed a unique sound for which they drew as heavily on British beat as on soul music, rhythm and blues, and folk rock. Many of their recordings featured a brass section, which was a novelty in those days among American rock bands, with groups like Chicago just developing.

The bulk of the band's material continued to be written by Dunhill Records staff (not only Sloan and Barri) and the LA studio musicians who were part of what became known as the Wrecking Crew played the music on most, but not all, of their hits. The Grass Roots also recorded songs written by the group's musicians, which appeared on their albums and the B-sides of many hit singles.

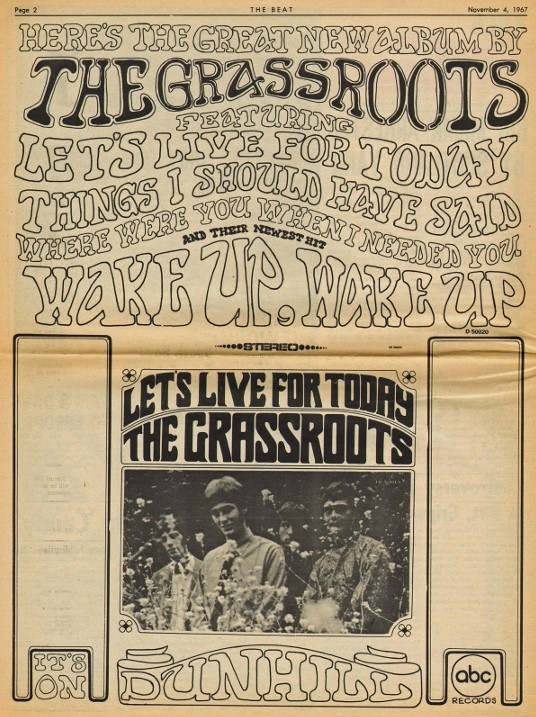
Ad for the album Let's Live for Today in KRLA Beat

As the Grass Roots, they had their first top-10 hit in the summer of 1967 with "Let's Live for Today", an English-language cover version of "Piangi con me", a 1966 hit for the Anglo-Italian quartet The Rokes. "Let's Live for Today" sold over one million copies and was awarded a gold disc. With Rob Grill as lead singer, they recorded a third version of "Where Were You When I Needed You". The band continued in a similar hit-making vein for the next five years (1967–1972).

The Grass Roots played at the Fantasy Fair and Magic Mountain Music Festival on Sunday, June 11, 1967, in the Summer of Love as "Let's Live for Today" was at number 15 and climbing.

In late 1967, the band recorded the album Feelings, which featured much heavier input in the songwriting and playing by the group members themselves, but its failure to sell prompted Barri to take full hold of the reins again, as he moved the band in a more R&B, horn-punctuated direction. By this time, Sloan had phased out of his involvement with the band and relocated to New York City to pursue a solo career.

On Sunday October 27, 1968, the Grass Roots played at the San Francisco Pop Festival as their hit "Midnight Confessions" (their first record to feature horns, and with Carol Kaye playing the opening bassline) was peaking at number five. They then played at the Los Angeles Pop Festival and Miami Pop Festival in December 1968.

Creed Bratton became frustrated by Dunhill's refusal to allow the band to write its own songs and play the instruments on its records (although the members did play alone at concerts). After a disastrous appearance at the Fillmore West in April 1969, a "slightly inebriated" Bratton was asked to leave the band. He was replaced by Dennis Provisor on keyboards and vocals, and lead guitarist Terry Furlong (1969–1971) was also brought in to form a quintet. This was the first of many line-up changes for this version of the band.

According to Rob Grill, the band turned down "Don't Pull Your Love" and "Love Grows (Where My Rosemary Goes)," reportedly because Grass Roots frontman Rob Grill balked at singing a love song that might be thought to refer to co-member Warren Entner's wife Rosemarie Frankland. Both songs became regulars they performed live and later included on their 2000 live album The Grass Roots – Live At Last.

The Grass Roots, with their new members, played at Newport Pop Festival 1969 at Devonshire Downs, which was a racetrack at the time but now is part of the North Campus for California State University, Northridge. The group played on Sunday June 22, 1969, a week before their hit "I'd Wait A Million Years" reached the Hot 100. In Canada they played at the Vancouver Pop Festival at the Paradise Valley Resort in British Columbia in August 1969.

By 1971, Furlong had stopped touring with the group to pursue a solo career, but continued to contribute on records during the rest of the band's time on Dunhill. His touring replacement was Brian Naughton, who left in 1972. Drummer Rick Coonce was gone as well, by the beginning of 1972, and new members Joe Pollard (drums, percussion) and another guitarist named Terry (last name unknown) joined up. Terry was soon replaced by Reed Kailing (vocals, guitars). Drummer Pollard and keyboardist Dennis Provisor left soon after to go out as a duo (although Provisor was featured on the band's 1972 Move Along album) and were replaced by a returning Rick Coonce and keyboard man Virgil Weber (ex-Hamilton, Joe Frank & Reynolds and Climax). But Coonce was back for only a short period before he was gone again, turning the drum slot over to original member Joel Larson. Singers Rob Grill and Warren Entner remained the point of focus during these years.

The group's songs during 1967–1972 include: "Let's Live for Today", a cover of an Italian hit by The Rokes, "Piangi con me" (U.S. number eight) and "Things I Should Have Said" (U.S. number 23) (1967); "Midnight Confessions" (U.S. number five, their biggest hit) (1968); "Bella Linda" (a cover of an Italian hit by Lucio Battisti, "Balla Linda") (U.S. number 28), "Lovin' Things" (a cover of a UK hit by Marmalade the previous year) (U.S. number 49), "The River Is Wide" (U.S. number 31), "I'd Wait a Million Years" (U.S. number 15) and "Heaven Knows" (U.S. number 24) (1969); "Walking Through the Country" (U.S. number 44) and "Baby Hold On" (U.S. number 35) (1970); "Temptation Eyes" (number 15), "Sooner or Later" (U.S. number 9) and "Two Divided by Love" (U.S. number 16) (1971); "Glory Bound" (U.S. number 34) and "The Runway" (U.S. number 39) (1972).

By early 1974, the Grass Roots had left Dunhill (now ABC Records), and Kailing, Weber and longtime member Entner (later a successful manager with groups such as Rage Against the Machine and Quiet Riot) moved on, while former members Terry Furlong and Dennis Provisor returned. But Furlong left permanently by mid-1974 to be succeeded by Gene Barkin, then by Reggie Knighton. The resulting group was Grill, Larson, Provisor, and Knighton. Dennis Lambert and Brian Potter, who had penned the group's 1971 hit "Two Divided by Love" and many others, invited the band to join their Haven label, where they released an eponymous album in 1975, The Grass Roots, containing the single "Mamacita", which charted at number 71 on the Billboard Hot 100. Follow-up singles failed to chart.

== Later years ==
=== 1976 to 1981 ===
Their 1976 single "Out In The Open" proved to be their swan song on Haven. Knighton left in 1976 and Alan Deane took over, followed by guitarist Glen Shulfer in 1977. ABC Records issued a final greatest-hits package of the group titled ABC Collection in 1976, but in late 1977, Grill decided to take a break from performing and later recorded the 14 Greats album on Gusto Records featuring Provisor and himself. This album consisted of 1978 rerecordings of their hits.

The group, still managed and booked by Grill (who owned the group's name), in late 1977 continued touring with Larson, Mark Miller (lead vocals, guitar) and Brian Carlyss (bass, backing vocals), joined by Lonnie Price (lead vocals, keyboards) and Randy Ruff (organ, backing vocals) for touring dates and TV appearances until November 1978. Larson was then joined by new players Scott Hoyt (lead vocals, guitars), David Nagy (lead vocals, bass) and Gene Wall (keyboards). Nagy and Larson left in 1979 and were replaced by a returning Carlyss and Reagan McKinley (drums, percussion).

During this period, the group appeared on an HBO television special, '60s Rock Scrapbook, filmed at Magic Mountain amusement park in Valencia, California, in October 1979, with Grill and Dennis Provisor making special appearances.

Grill launched a solo career in 1979 (assisted on his solo album, Uprooted, by Lindsey Buckingham, Mick Fleetwood and John McVie of Fleetwood Mac on the song "Rock Sugar"). Grill toured as a solo act in 1979–1980 opening for Fleetwood Mac's Tusk tour with a band led by guitarist Rick Alexander.

When interest in bands of the 1960s rose again in 1980, Grill (along with Provisor, Shulfer and new players Steve Berendt on bass and Luke Meurett on drums) took back the Grass Roots name and toured the United States and Japan. Guitarist Miller returned to fill in on guitar for Shulfer on some dates with the group in 1981 and Ron Pitt and Mike Daley replaced Berendt and Meurett respectively the same year.

=== 1982 to 1993 ===
In 1982 Grill went forward with a brand-new lineup consisting of seasoned session players. They were Terry Oubre (guitars, backing vocals), Charles Judge (keyboards, synthesizers, backing vocals) and Ralph Gilmore (drums, percussion, backing vocals). Another keyboardist, Bob Luna, came in around mid-1982 to substitute for Judge on dates when he was not available. That same year, the new band released Powers of the Night on MCA. This was the last album of new material to be released by the Grass Roots to date.

Later in 1982, the Grass Roots performed an Independence Day concert on the National Mall in Washington, D.C., attracting a large crowd and setting a record for attendance (over half a million people), at that time, for an outdoor concert for a single musical act. In April 1983, James G. Watt, President Ronald Reagan's Secretary of the Interior, banned Independence Day concerts on the mall by such groups. Watt said, "rock bands" that had performed on the Mall on Independence Day in 1981 and 1982 had encouraged drug use and alcoholism and had attracted "the wrong element", who would mug people and families attending any similar events in the future. During the ensuing uproar, Grill stated that he felt "highly insulted" by Watt's remarks, which he called "nothing but un-American".

After Powers of the Night failed to attract much attention, Grill and the group continued to tour into 1984. Dave Rodgers (keyboards, backing vocals) replaced Charles Judge and after Terry Oubre and Ralph Gilmore departed, Grill brought in two additional new players named George Spellman (guitars, backing vocals) and Coy Fuller (drums, percussion) and toured Europe in mid 1984. According to Grill, a country single, "St. Somewhere", also was recorded in Nashville with this same lineup. The single had a very limited release, with the same song on the flip (as Oak 1071) credited to Rob Grill and the Grass Roots. "St. Somewhere" was written by Kent Robbins and the track was produced by Mark Sherrill.

By late 1984, Grill had returned to the US and was touring with yet another new group of Grass Roots that included Dusty Hanvey (guitars, backing vocals), Larry Nelson (keyboards, synthesizers, backing vocals), and David Page (drums, percussion). This lineup's first show was in Okinawa.

From this point on, Grill and the group would concentrate on the "1960s nostalgia" circuit, starting with the Happy Together '85 Tour with fellow 1960s groups The Turtles, The Buckinghams, and Gary Lewis & the Playboys.

In 1986 another package had them appearing with The Monkees, Gary Puckett and Herman's Hermits. They were joined in this show by bassist Mark Clarke (ex-Uriah Heep and Rainbow) and a horn section and backed up The Monkees and Gary Puckett during their sets, as well.

Hanvey and Nelson continued backing The Monkees for their 1987 tour, while the Grass Roots joined Classic Superfest, which also featured Herman's Hermits, Mark Lindsay and Gene Clark's Byrds. For this tour, Mark Tomorsky handled guitar and Michael Lewis (soon replaced by Robbie Barker) was on keyboards. Terry Danauer was also added on bass then, but by October 1987, Hanvey and Nelson were back with Grill, and Joe Dougherty replaced David Page on drums in 1989.

In 1991 Rhino Records released a double CD anthology of the group.

Mike Stec came in for Danauer on bass in 1992–1993 before Grill took over bass again. From here on the band's lineup was stable.

=== 1994 to 2011 ===
On January 16, 1999, former Grass Roots members Joel Larson, Virgil Weber and Creed Bratton, along with Paul Downing on vocals and lead guitar (of Herman's Hermits and The Standells), Justin Chats on vocals, keyboards and saxophone, Dan Schwartz on bass and David Olson on backing vocals, were part of a 35th Anniversary Celebration at the Whisky a Go Go in Los Angeles. They shared the stage with Johnny Rivers, Nancy Sinatra, the Robby Krieger Band and Drake Levin and Phil Volk of Paul Revere and the Raiders.

In 2000 Grill released a Grass Roots live concert album titled Live at Last.

During the 2000s, the group regulars had available substitutes: former Outsiders singer Sonny Geraci sat in for Grill during the first half of 2002, Scott Sechman filled in for Hanvey in 1998, Chris Merrell filled in for Hanvey on various dates 2000–2006, while Hal Ratliff came in for Nelson when he had other commitments from 2000 on.

In 2008 Grill released a second live concert album titled Live Gold and brought in Mark Dawson (vocals, bass) earlier that year to fill in when he was absent.

During the summers of 2010 and 2011, the Grass Roots had heavy touring schedules throughout the U.S., both on their own and as part of the Happy Together: 25th Anniversary Tour, along with Flo & Eddie of The Turtles, Mark Lindsay, The Buckinghams and The Monkees member Micky Dolenz.

Grill continued to lead the band into the current millennium as the Grass Roots sole owner and made appearances with the band until his death.

Rick Coonce died of heart failure on February 25, 2011, and Rob Grill died on July 11, 2011, from complications following a stroke.

=== 2012 to present ===
In 2012 the group was again part of the Happy Together Tour and the current band of Dawson, Dougherty, Hanvey and Nelson continued to tour nationwide, oftentimes appearing with other classic rock groups such as John Kay and Steppenwolf, Tommy James and The Shondells, The Buckinghams and Herman's Hermits starring Peter Noone.

Creed Bratton referred to his time with the Grass Roots in an episode of The Office ("Booze Cruise" in season two) in the deleted scenes on DVD.

Again in 2015, they joined The Turtles, The Association, Mark Lindsay, The Buckinghams and The Cowsills for that year's Happy Together Tour.

In December 2015, the American Pop Music Hall of Fame released their 2016 inductees: Barbra Streisand, The Grass Roots, Barry Manilow, Neil Sedaka, The Association, Dion, The Lettermen, Paul Revere and the Raiders, The Temptations and Three Dog Night.

In 2016, the Grass Roots were part of the Flower Power Cruise, joining Peter Asher, Blood, Sweat & Tears, Felix Cavaliere, Micky Dolenz, The Guess Who, Peter Noone, Jefferson Starship, Mark Lindsay, Gary Puckett, The Turtles and Christian Nesmith.

== Band members ==
=== Current ===
- Mark Dawson — lead vocals, bass guitar (2008–present)
- Dusty Hanvey — lead guitar, backing vocals (1984–present)
- Larry Nelson — keyboards, synthesizers, backing vocals (1984–present)
- Joe Dougherty — drums, percussion (1989–present)

=== Former ===
Original

- Steve Barri – backing vocals, various instruments, songwriter, producer (1965–73)
- P. F. Sloan – lead vocals, guitar, songwriter, producer (1965–67; died 2015)
- Joel Larson – drums (1965–66, 1972–79)

The Bedouins

- Denny Ellis – rhythm guitar, backing vocals (1965–66)
- Willie Fulton – lead vocals, lead guitar (1965–66)
- David Stensen – bass, backing vocals (1965–66)
- Bill Shoppe - drums (1966)

13th Floor

- Rob Grill – vocals, bass, songwriter (1967–77, 1980–2011; died 2011)
- Warren Entner – vocals, rhythm guitar, keyboards, songwriter (1967–74)
- Rick Coonce – drums, percussion, songwriter (1967–71, 1972; died 2011)
- Creed Bratton – lead guitar, vocals, songwriter (1967–69)

Other 1960s additions

- Dennis Provisor – vocals, keyboards, songwriter (1969–72, 1974–77, 1980–82)
- Terry Furlong – lead guitar (1969–71, 1974)

1970s additions

- Brian Naughton – lead guitar (1971–72)
- Virgil Weber – keyboards (1972–74)
- Reed Kailing – lead guitar, vocals, songwriter (1972–74)
- Joe Pollard – drums, percussion (1972)
- Terry – lead guitar (1972)
- Gene Barkin – guitar (1974)
- Reggie Knighton – lead guitar, backing vocals (1974–76)
- Alan Deane – lead guitar, backing vocals (1976–77)
- Glen Shulfer – guitar, backing vocals (1977, 1980–82)
- Brian Carlyss – bass, backing vocals (1977–78, 1979–80; died 2007)
- Mark Miller – lead guitar, lead vocals (1977–78, 1981)
- Lonnie Price – keyboards, lead vocals (1977–78)
- Randy Ruff – organ, backing vocals (1977–78)
- Scott Hoyt – lead vocals, lead guitar (1978–80)
- Gene Wall – keyboards, backing vocals (1978–80)
- Dave Nagy – bass, lead vocals (1978–79)
- Reagan McKinley – drums, percussion (1979–80)

1980s additions

- Steve Berendt – bass, backing vocals (1980–81)
- Luke Meurett – drums, percussion (1980–81)
- Ron Pitt - bass, backing vocals (1981)
- Mike Daley - drums, percussion (1981)
- Terry Oubre – lead guitar, backing vocals (1982–84)
- Ralph Gilmore – drums, percussion, backing vocals (1982–84)
- Charles Judge – keyboards, synthesizers, backing vocals (1982–84)
- Bob Luna – keyboards, backing vocals (fill in, 1982)
- Coy Fuller – drums, percussion (1984)
- George Spellman – guitar, backing vocals (1984)
- Dave Rodgers – keyboards, backing vocals (1984)
- David Page – drums, percussion (1984–90)
- Terry Danauer – bass (1987–92)
- Cary Lenard - keyboards, backing vocals (1989)
- Richard Fanning – trumpet (on occasion, 1987–88)
- Kevin Osborne – trombone (on occasion, 1987–88)
- Robbie Barker – keyboards (1987)
- Michael Lewis – keyboards (1987)
- Mark Tomorsky – guitar, backing vocals (1987)

1990s additions

- Michael Stec – bass, backing vocals (1992–93)
- Scott Sechman – guitar, backing vocals (fill in, 1998)

2000s fills

- Chris Merrell – (died from cancer) lead guitar, backing vocals (fill in 2000–03, 2006)
- Hal Ratliff – keyboards, backing vocals (fill in 2000–present)
- Sonny Geraci – lead vocals (fill in for Grill, 2002; died 2017)

Timeline

== Discography ==
=== Singles ===
| Release date | Title / A-side | B-side From same album as A-side except where indicated | Record label | Chart positions | | | | | | | Album |
| Release date | Title / A-side | B-side From same album as A-side except where indicated | Record label | US Billboard | US Cashbox | US Record World | US AC | Canada | AU | ZA | Album |
|---|---|---|---|---|---|---|---|---|---|---|---|
| 1965 | "Mr. Jones (Ballad of a Thin Man)" | "You're a Lonely Girl" (Non-LP track) | Dunhill | 121 | 104 | 95 | — | — | — | — | Where Were You When I Needed You |
| 1966 | "Where Were You When I Needed You" | "These Are Bad Times" (Non-LP track) | Dunhill | 28 | 33 | 26 | — | 12 | — | 13 | Where Were You When I Needed You |
| 1966 | "Only When You're Lonely" | "This Is What I Was Made For" | Dunhill | 96 | 77 | 93 | — | 88 | — | — | Where Were You When I Needed You |
| 1966 | "Tip of My Tongue" | "Look Out Girl" (from Where Were You When I Needed You) | Dunhill | — | — | — | — | — | — | — | Non-LP track |
| 1967 | "Let's Live for Today" + | "Depressed Feeling" (Non-LP track) | Dunhill | 8 | 5 | 5 | — | 3 | 83 | 1 | Let's Live for Today |
| 1967 | "Things I Should Have Said" | "Tip of My Tongue" | Dunhill | 23 | 36 | 34 | — | 9 | — | — | Let's Live for Today |
| 1967 | "Wake Up, Wake Up" | "No Exit" | Dunhill | 68 | 61 | 43 | — | 18 | — | — | Let's Live for Today |
| 1968 | "Melody for You" | "Hey Friend" | Dunhill | 123 | 120 | 75 | — | — | — | — | Feelings |
| 1968 | "Feelings" | "Here's Where You Belong" | Dunhill | — | 118 | 108 | — | — | — | — | Feelings |
| 1968 | "Midnight Confessions" + | "Who Will You Be Tomorrow" (from Feelings) | Dunhill | 5 | 5 | 3 | — | 4 | 18 | 9 | Golden Grass: Their Greatest Hits |
| 1968 | "Bella Linda" | "Hot Bright Lights" (from Feelings) | Dunhill | 28 | 20 | 19 | — | 14 | 35 | — | Golden Grass: Their Greatest Hits |
| 1969 | "Melody for You" | "All Good Things Come to an End" | Dunhill | — | — | — | — | — | — | — | Feelings |
| 1969 | "Lovin' Things" | "You and Love Are the Same" (from Feelings) | Dunhill | 49 | 35 | 30 | — | 24 | 78 | — | Lovin' Things |
| 1969 | "The River Is Wide" | "(You Gotta) Live for Love" | Dunhill | 31 | 16 | 16 | — | 4 | — | — | Lovin' Things |
| 1969 | "I'd Wait a Million Years" | "Fly Me to Havana" (from Lovin' Things) | Dunhill | 15 | 12 | 11 | — | 12 | — | — | Leaving It All Behind |
| 1969 | "Heaven Knows" | "Don't Remind Me" | Dunhill | 24 | 13 | 12 | — | 5 | 67 | — | Leaving It All Behind |
| 1970 | "Walking Through the Country" | "Truck Drivin' Man" | Dunhill | 44 | 30 | 27 | — | 34 | 61 | — | Leaving It All Behind |
| 1970 | "Baby Hold On" | "Get It Together" | Dunhill | 35 | 25 | 26 | — | 20 | 52 | — | More Golden Grass |
| 1970 | "Come on and Say It" | "Something's Comin' Over Me" (from Leaving It All Behind) | Dunhill | 61 | 39 | 42 | — | 27 | — | — | More Golden Grass |
| 1970 | "Temptation Eyes" | "Keepin' Me Down" | Dunhill | 15 | 16 | 11 | — | 22 | 79 | — | More Golden Grass |
| 1971 | "Sooner or Later" | "I Can Turn Off the Rain" (from More Golden Grass) | Dunhill | 9 | 12 | 10 | 37 | 13 | 95 | — | Their 16 Greatest Hits |
| 1971 | "Two Divided by Love" | "Let It Go" (from More Golden Grass) | Dunhill | 16 | 8 | 11 | 37 | 2 | 64 | — | Move Along |
| 1972 | "Glory Bound" | "Only One" | Dunhill | 34 | 22 | 25 | — | 13 | 92 | — | Move Along |
| 1972 | "The Runway" | "Move Along" | Dunhill | 39 | 29 | 36 | — | 22 | — | — | Move Along |
| 1972 | "Anyway the Wind Blows" | "Monday Love" | Dunhill | 107 | 101 | - | — | — | — | — | Move Along |
| 1973 | "Love Is What You Make It" | "Someone to Love" (from Move Along) | Dunhill | 55 | 32 | 27 | 31 | 41 | — | — | Alotta' Mileage |
| 1973 | "Where There's Smoke There's Fire" | "Look But Don't Touch" | Dunhill | — | 88 | 92 | — | 49 (AC) | — | — | Alotta' Mileage |
| 1973 | "We Can't Dance to Your Music" | "Look But Don't Touch" | Dunhill | — | 97 | | — | — | — | — | Non-LP tracks |
| 1973 | "Stealin' Love (In the Night)" | "We Almost Made It Together" | Dunhill | — | — | — | — | — | — | — | Non-LP tracks |
| 1975 | "Mamacita" | "The Last Time Around" | Haven | 71 | 84 | 87 | — | — | — | — | The Grass Roots |
| 1975 | "Naked Man" | "Nothing Good Comes Easy" | Haven | — | — | — | — | — | — | — | The Grass Roots |
| 1976 | "Out in the Open" | "Optical Illusion" | Haven | — | — | — | — | — | — | — | The Grass Roots |
| 1982 | "Here Comes That Feeling Again" | "Temptation Eyes" (remix, non-LP track) | MCA | — | — | — | — | — | — | — | Powers of the Night |
| 1982 | "She Don't Know Me" | "Keep on Burning" | MCA | — | — | — | — | — | — | — | Powers of the Night |
| 1982 | "Powers of the Night" | "Powers of the Night" | MCA | — | — | — | — | — | — | — | Powers of the Night |

+ Gold Record – RIAA Certification

=== Albums ===
| Release date | Title | Record label | Chart positions | | | | |
| Release date | Title | Record label | US Billboard | US Cashbox | US Record World | Canada | UK |
|---|---|---|---|---|---|---|---|
| 1966 | Where Were You When I Needed You | Dunhill | — | — | — | — | — |
| 1967 | Let's Live for Today | Dunhill | 75 | 69 | 63 | — | — |
| 1968 | Feelings | Dunhill | — | — | 94 | — | — |
| 1968 | Golden Grass + | Dunhill | 25 | 25 | 24 | 25 | — |
| 1969 | Lovin' Things | Dunhill | 73 | 58 | 48 | 39 | — |
| 1969 | Leaving It All Behind | Dunhill | 36 | 34 | 31 | 37 | — |
| 1970 | More Golden Grass | Dunhill | 152 | 89 | 103 | — | — |
| 1971 | Their 16 Greatest Hits + | Dunhill | 58 | 30 | 36 | 34 | — |
| 1972 | Move Along | Dunhill | 86 | 57 | 59 | 80 | — |
| 1973 | Alotta' Mileage | Dunhill | 222 | — | — | — | — |
| 1975 | The Grass Roots | Haven | — | — | — | — | — |
| 1976 | The ABC Collection | ABC | — | — | — | — | — |
| 1978 | 14 Greatest | Gusto | — | — | — | — | — |
| 1982 | Powers of the Night | MCA | — | — | — | — | — |
| 2000 | Live at Last | RFG | — | — | — | — | — |
| 2001 | Symphonic Hits | Cleopatra | — | — | — | — | — |
| 2008 | Live Gold | RFG | — | — | — | — | — |
| 2014 | The Complete Original Dunhill/ABC Hit Singles | Real Gone Music | — | — | — | — | — |

+ Gold Record – RIAA Certification
