= Los Angeles Pop Festival =

1968 music festival in Los Angeles, California

The Los Angeles Pop Festival
- Genre: Rock, pop, etc.
- Dates: December 22 and 23, 1968
- Locations: Los Angeles Memorial Sports Arena; United States
- Years active: 1968

The Los Angeles Pop Festival was held at the Los Angeles Memorial Sports Arena in California. The dates of the festival were December 22 and 23, 1968. It was also called a "Christmas Happening". The groups playing at the festival included (in alphabetical order):

- Blue Cheer
- The Box Tops
- Canned Heat
- The Chambers Brothers
- José Feliciano
- The Grass Roots
- The Love Exchange
- Buddy Miles
- The Righteous Brothers
- Steve Miller Blues Band
- Three Dog Night
- The Turtles

== See also ==
- List of historic rock festivals
- List of music festivals in the United States
