= San Francisco Pop Festival =

1968 American music festival at the Alameda County Fairgrounds

San Francisco International Pop Festival
- Genre: Rock, pop, etc.
- Dates: October 26–27, 1968
- Locations: Alameda County Fairgrounds; United States

The KYA San Francisco International Pop Festival was held at the Alameda County Fairgrounds on Saturday October 26 and Sunday October 27, 1968.

== Groups ==
The groups playing at the festival included (in alphabetical order):

- Eric Burdon and The Animals
- Canned Heat
- The Chambers Brothers
- Creedence Clearwater Revival
- Deep Purple
- José Feliciano
- Fraternity of Man
- The Grass Roots
- Iron Butterfly
- The Loading Zone
- Mad River
- Buddy Miles Express
- Lee Michaels
- Procol Harum
- Rejoice
- Johnny Rivers
- Spiders
- The Womb

== History ==
The San Francisco International Pop Festival was rescheduled from Searsville Lake, San Mateo County, CA October 5-6, 1968.

== See also ==
- List of music festivals in the United States
- List of historic rock festivals
- List of pop festivals
