= Lovin' Things (song) =

1968 song

Single by The Marmalade

from the album There’s A Lot Of It About
- B-side: "Hey Joe"
- Released: 1968
- Recorded: CBS Studio New Bond St London
- Genre: Rock, pop
- Label: CBS Records
- Songwriter(s): Artie Schroeck, Jet Loring
- Producer(s): Mike Smith

The Marmalade singles chronology
"Man In A Shop" (1968)	"Lovin' Things" (1968)	"Wait for Me Mary-Anne" (1969)

"Lovin' Things" is a 1968 song recorded by Scottish group The Marmalade, later covered by The Grass Roots. The song was written by Artie Schroeck and Jet Loring. It was the band's first successful single release, reaching number six on the UK singles chart. Their version was not, however, released in North America.

== Grass Roots cover ==
"Lovin' Things"

Single by The Grass Roots

from the album Lovin' Things
- B-side: "You and Love Are the Same"
- Released: February 1969
- Genre: Sunshine pop
- Label: ABC/Dunhill
- Songwriter(s): Artie Schroeck, Jet Loring
- Producer(s): Steve Barri

The Grass Roots singles chronology
"Melody For You" (1969)	"Lovin' Things" (1969)	"The River Is Wide" (1969)

"Lovin' Things" was released in 1968 by Bobby Rydell then covered the following year by The Grass Roots. It was the lead single from their album of the same name. The song became a modest hit in both Canada and the United States.

== Chart performance ==
(The Marmalade)

=== Weekly charts ===
Chart (1968)	Peak position
UK Singles Chart	6

=== Year-end charts ===
Chart (1968)	Rank
UK	81

(The Grass Roots)

Chart (1969)	Peak position
Australia (Kent Music Report)	78
Canada RPM Top Singles	24
US Billboard Hot 100	49
US Cash Box Top 100	35
US Record World	30

== Other versions ==
- "Lovin' Things" was first released by the writer, Artie Schroeck on Columbia Records in early 1967.
- Bobby Rydell did a version of the song in 1967. It was released as an A-side with "That's What I Call Livin'" on the flip and did not chart. He performed "Lovin' Things" on the Dick Clark ABC-TV Saturday-afternoon program, American Bandstand on February 28, 1970.
- Keith Mansfield Orchestra, on his 1968 album All You Need Is Keith Mansfield
- December's Children, in 1968
- Petula Clark, on her 1969 album Portrait of Petula
- The Ventures, on their 1969 gold album Hawaii Five-O
