= A Must to Avoid =

Single by Herman's Hermits

from the album Hold On!
- B-side: "The Man with the Cigar"
- Released: 17 December 1965 (UK); December 1965 (US)
- Recorded: 30 September 1965
- Studio: RCA Studio B, Hollywood
- Genre: Rock
- Length: 2:18
- Label: MGM 13437
- Songwriters: P.F. Sloan, Steve Barri
- Producer: Mickie Most

Herman's Hermits singles chronology
"Just a Little Bit Better" (1965)	"A Must to Avoid" (1965)	"Listen People" / "You Won't Be Leaving" (1966)

"A Must to Avoid" is a song written by P.F. Sloan and Steve Barri and performed by Herman's Hermits. It was featured on their 1966 album, Hold On! and on their 1966 EP, A Must to Avoid. The song was produced by Mickie Most.

== Background ==
Billboard said of the single: "The group has a winning and swinging rocker with hit written all over it." Cash Box described it as a "rhythmic, twangy item about an unusual gal who means poison to any guy."

== Chart performance ==
"A Must to Avoid" reached No.1 in New Zealand, No.3 in Canada, No.4 in Australia, No.5 in Norway, No.6 on the UK's Record Retailer chart, and No.8 on the Billboard Hot 100 in 1965.

== Influences ==
- This song was reworked by the Swedish band The Shanes as Chris-Craft No. 9.
