= Midnight Confessions =

Single by The Grass Roots

from the album Golden Grass
- B-side: "Who Will You Be Tomorrow"
- Released: June 1968
- Recorded: 1968 in Los Angeles, California
- Genre: Blue-eyed soul; R&B
- Length: 2:42
- Label: ABC/Dunhill
- Songwriter: Lou Josie
- Producer: Steve Barri

The Grass Roots singles chronology
"Feelings" (1968)	"Midnight Confessions" (1968)	"Bella Linda" (1968)

"Midnight Confessions" is a song written by Lou T. Josie and originally performed by the Ever-Green Blues. American rock band The Grass Roots later made it famous when they released it as a single in 1968. Though never released on any of the group's studio albums, it was on their first compilation album, Golden Grass, and has since been included on many of their other compilations.

The Grass Roots version became the band's biggest charting hit on the Billboard Hot 100, reaching the Top 5 of both the U.S. and Canadian pop singles charts.

== Background and recording ==
The lyrics describe a man who is infatuated with a married woman, knows he can never have her, and is relegated to confessing his love for her audibly, but alone. The original recording of "Midnight Confessions" was a demo by the Evergreen Blues Band, whose manager – Lou Josie – wrote the song. The demo contained a horn section and caught the attention of record producer/engineer Steve Barri, who was looking to produce a song for the Grass Roots that was a "West Coast" version of a Motown-style production. The Grass Roots track was produced/engineered by Steve Barri with the horn section's arrangement by Jimmie Haskell. The instrumentation was recorded by the group of Los Angeles studio musicians known as The Wrecking Crew, as were many hits by the Grass Roots. Rob Grill and Warren Entner shared lead vocals, with Grill singing the verses and Entner, the choruses.

== Release and reception ==
"Midnight Confessions" was released as a single by the ABC/Dunhill record label in late June 1968. It was the Grass Roots' first to feature a horn section and was therefore a departure from the group's previous singles; the band members worried that this would preclude it from becoming a hit. However, it was well received and became their biggest hit in the United States, peaking at #5 on the Billboard Hot 100 on November 2, 1968, and was certified gold by the Recording Industry Association of America, with sales of over one million units, on December 3, 1968. The single also did well in Canada, peaking at #4 on the RPM 100 singles chart.

== Chart performance ==
=== Weekly charts ===
Chart (1968)	Peak position
Australia KMR	18
Canada RPM Top Singles	4
South Africa (Springbok Radio)	9
U.S. Billboard Hot 100	5
U.S. Cash Box Top 100	5

=== Year-end charts ===
Chart (1968)	Rank
Canada	34
U.S. Billboard Hot 100	19
U.S. Cash Box	30
