= P. F. Sloan =

American singer and songwriter (1945–2015)

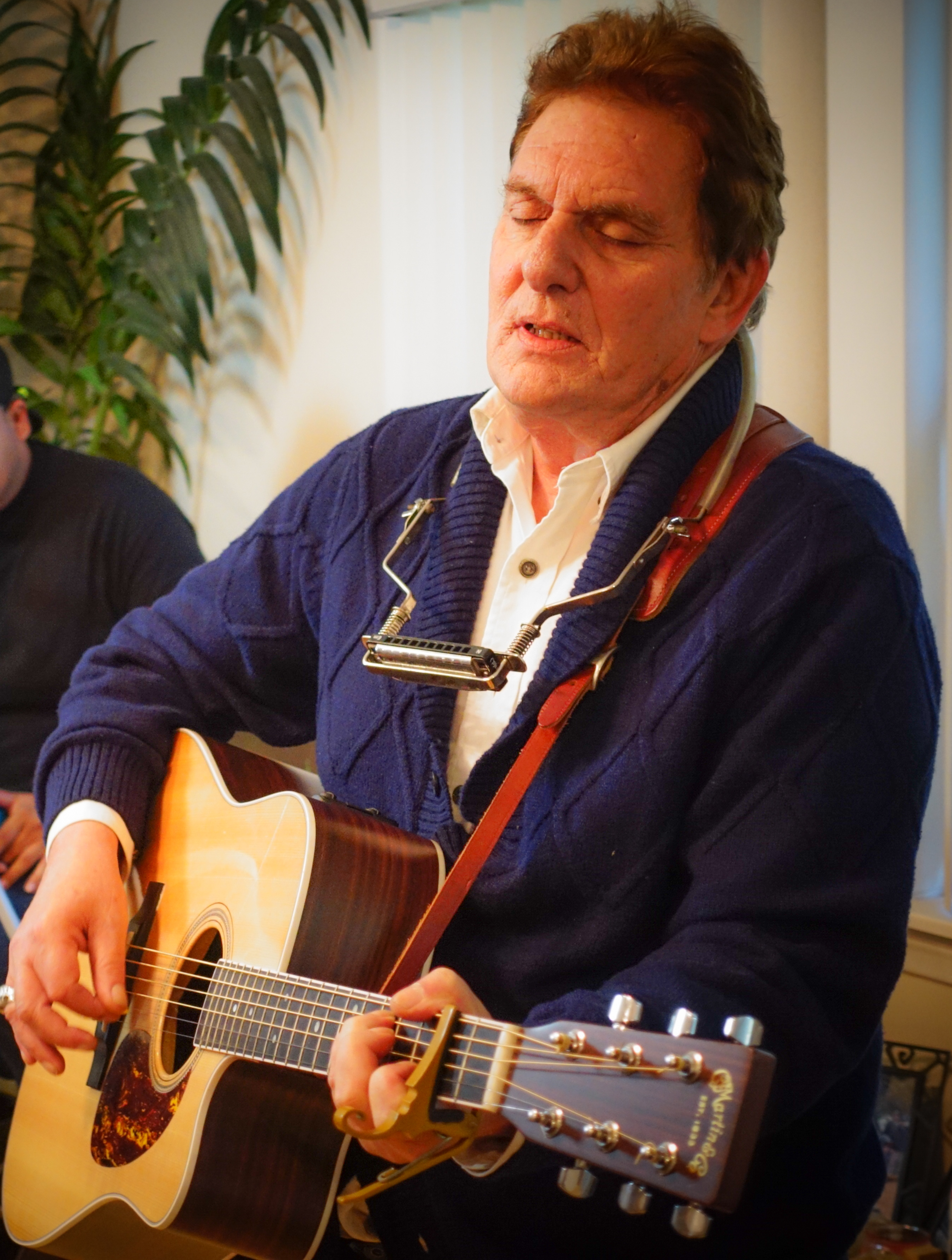
- Sloan performing in 2014

Background information
- Also known as: Flip
- Born: Philip Gary Schlein; September 18, 1945; New York City, U.S.
- Died: November 15, 2015 (aged 70) Los Angeles, California, U.S.
- Genre: Pop rock
- Occupations: Songwriter; singer; producer
- Labels: Aladdin; Dunhill; Mart; ATCO; Mums; Vee-Jay; Interphon; RCA; Counsel; Reprise; Amy; Imperial; Pioneer; Varèse Sarabande; Hightone; Ace; MsMusic
- Website: the-grassroots.com (archived)

Philip Gary "Flip" Sloan (né Schlein; September 18, 1945 – November 15, 2015), known professionally as P. F. Sloan, was an American singer and songwriter. During the mid-1960s, he wrote, performed, and produced many Billboard Top 20 hits for artists such as Barry McGuire, the Searchers, Jan and Dean, Herman's Hermits, Johnny Rivers, the Grass Roots, the Turtles, and the Mamas and the Papas.

Sloan's signature song is "Eve of Destruction," a 1965 U.S. number one for McGuire. Many of his songs were written in collaboration with Steve Barri. Their partnership yielded two US Top Ten hits—Herman's Hermits' "A Must to Avoid" (1965) and Johnny Rivers' "Secret Agent Man" (1966)—and the Turtles' "You Baby" (1966).

== Biography ==
=== Early life and career ===
Sloan was born in New York City, United States, to a Jewish American father and a Romanian-born mother. His family moved to West Hollywood, California in 1957, where his father, a pharmacist, changed the family name from "Schlein" to "Sloan" after repeatedly being denied a liquor license for his store. When Sloan was 13, his father bought him a guitar. While at the music store in Hollywood, Sloan met Elvis Presley, who gave him an impromptu music lesson. In 1959, at 14, "Flip" Sloan recorded a single, "All I Want Is Loving" / "Little Girl in the Cabin" for the L.A. R&B record label Aladdin Records, which folded soon after its release.

At 16, he became part of the burgeoning Los Angeles music scene, landing a job on the songwriting staff at music publisher Screen Gems, which was then the largest publisher on the West Coast. There, he formed a partnership with Steve Barri, and the duo made several attempts at recording a hit single under names such as Philip and Stephan, The Rally-Packs, The Wildcats, The Street Cleaners, Themes Inc., and The Lifeguards. In 1963, they came to the attention of Screen Gems executive Lou Adler, who decided to use them as backing singers and musicians (Sloan on lead guitar and Barri on percussion) for Jan and Dean, whom he managed. Sloan and Barri wrote the theme song for the T.A.M.I. Show (Teen Age Music International Show) and were credited on all Jan and Dean albums from Dead Man's Curve / The New Girl in School in early 1964 through Command Performance in 1965. Jan Berry used Sloan as the lead falsetto voice instead of Dean Torrence on the band's top 10 hit "The Little Old Lady from Pasadena". Around that time, Sloan and Barri also wrote their first U.S. Billboard Top 100 hit, "Kick That Little Foot Sally Ann", arranged by Jack Nitzsche and performed by a Watts, California-born artist named Round Robin. Soon they also appeared on surf records by Bruce & Terry and the Rip Chords, and they recorded their own surf singles and album as The Fantastic Baggys.

=== Dunhill Records ===
Adler then doubled their salaries to hire them for his startup publisher Trousdale Music and startup label Dunhill Records. Using the name Phil F. Sloan or P. F. Sloan (the "F" stood for "Flip", his nickname), Sloan wrote or co-wrote hits for many performers, including "Eve of Destruction" (Barry McGuire); "You Baby" and "Let Me Be" (The Turtles); "A Must to Avoid" and "Hold On!" (Herman's Hermits); "Take Me For What I'm Worth" (The Searchers); and "Secret Agent Man" (Johnny Rivers). This last song was the theme tune for Danger Man, a British TV series that had been given a new title (Secret Agent) and theme for the US market. Due to its line "You're old enough to kill, but not for votin'", "Eve of Destruction" was used as a rallying cry by supporters of the Twenty-sixth Amendment to the United States Constitution, which changed the voting age from 21 to 18 as of 1971.

Sloan also became a session guitarist as part of the group of L.A. session musicians known as The Wrecking Crew, working with such well-known backing musicians as drummer Hal Blaine, guitarist Tommy Tedesco, bassists Joe Osborn and Carol Kaye, and bassist/keyboardist Larry Knechtel, among others. While working with Barry McGuire, Sloan created and played a guitar introduction as a hook to a new song by John Phillips entitled "California Dreamin'", and the same backing track was used for the hit version by Phillips' group The Mamas & the Papas, which led to Sloan being a regular in their recording sessions. Sloan generally played the lead guitar tracks on most of the songs he wrote, including the famous riff in "Secret Agent Man".

Sloan and Barri also were performers while on Dunhill. They released Dunhill's first album, a collection of surf instrumentals, as the "Rincon Surfside Band", and the album was later issued by RCA under the name "Willie and the Wheels". Sloan's successful folk-influenced songwriting caused Dunhill to record two solo albums by him. His single "Sins of a Family" reached the Billboard top 100 in fall 1965, in the wake of the huge success of "Eve of Destruction".

During this time, Sloan & Barri continued to do session work with Jan Berry of Jan & Dean, until Jan's near-fatal car wreck in April 1966, which basically ended Jan & Dean's career. They also produced a number of other acts, from Ann-Margret to The Robbs to Canadians Terry Black and Patrician-Anne McKinnon (both of whom had hits in Canada with Sloan-Barri songs) to Dunhill acts such as Shelley Fabares, The Ginger Snaps featuring Dandee Duncan, The Thomas Group (headed by Danny Thomas's son Tony), and The Iguanas (a Mexican band that did not speak English).

The main Sloan-Barri recording effort for Dunhill was done under the name The Grass Roots. However, after The Grass Roots enjoyed a Billboard Top 30 single with "Where Were You When I Needed You", the band's first album failed to chart, and Dunhill forced Sloan and Barri to recruit a real band to perform as The Grass Roots. Ultimately, a second band had to be recruited after the first one quit. Sloan and Barri continued as producers for the band, and they quickly generated a U.S. top 10 hit with a cover of the European hit "Let's Live for Today" (by the British band The Rokes). After that, though, the new Grass Roots wanted to write their own songs, and Sloan, who still wanted to be a recording artist, became alienated from both Barri and Dunhill management.

During this period, Sloan's growing experience and reputation also attracted the attention of other young and aspiring musical artists, seeking both musical and business advice. As a favor to a friend, Sloan in 1968 first met the relatively unknown Jimmy Webb at a private home for an informal but eye-opening visit. The very first song Webb played for him was "Wichita Lineman". Sloan recalls, "He played a couple of chords and began to unload. I was aware immediately that I was listening to a songwriter's voice. It was filled with feeling and emotion. Most songwriters don't have a voice, but this one was haunting and unusual and raw and wonderful." Sloan further explains, "There are singers and there are songwriters, and only rarely is there something known as a singer-songwriter. Singer-songwriters were a threat to the establishment. And I was one of them." Sloan explains that as the song continued, he felt relaxed at first, then nervously on edge "...figuring that he would screw the song up in some way. But he didn't. The song got better and better." This was followed by "Up, Up and Away" and an early version of "MacArthur Park". The next song, "By the Time I Get to Phoenix", brought Sloan to tears. Sloan assured Webb that every song could be a major hit, quipping that "Songwriters don't cry tears, they cry diamonds."

According to Barri, Sloan changed after the success of "Eve of Destruction": "He was two people. We were just two Jewish kids from New York. We liked the same movies. We played Wiffle ball together. But when 'Eve of Destruction' became such a smash, he went with Barry McGuire to England, and he came back a different person. His girlfriend, who I later married—both of us felt he never returned from England. He was a major, major talent. God, he was good." Sloan himself also described a change at this time: "I wanted to be loved. I wanted to be Elvis. ... But P.F. Sloan? He wanted honesty and truth."

During the Summer of Love, Sloan played as a solo artist on the first day (Saturday June 10, 1967) of the Fantasy Fair and Magic Mountain Music Festival. A famed celebration of pop music, on Mount Tamalpais, this seminal event occurred prior to the Monterey Pop Festival held the following weekend, although unlike the Monterey event no film or audio recordings were preserved and its history is much less known.

Sloan's final Dunhill release was a solo single, "I Can't Help But Wonder, Elizabeth" b/w "Karma (A Study of Divinations)", once again released under the name Philip Sloan.

=== After Dunhill ===
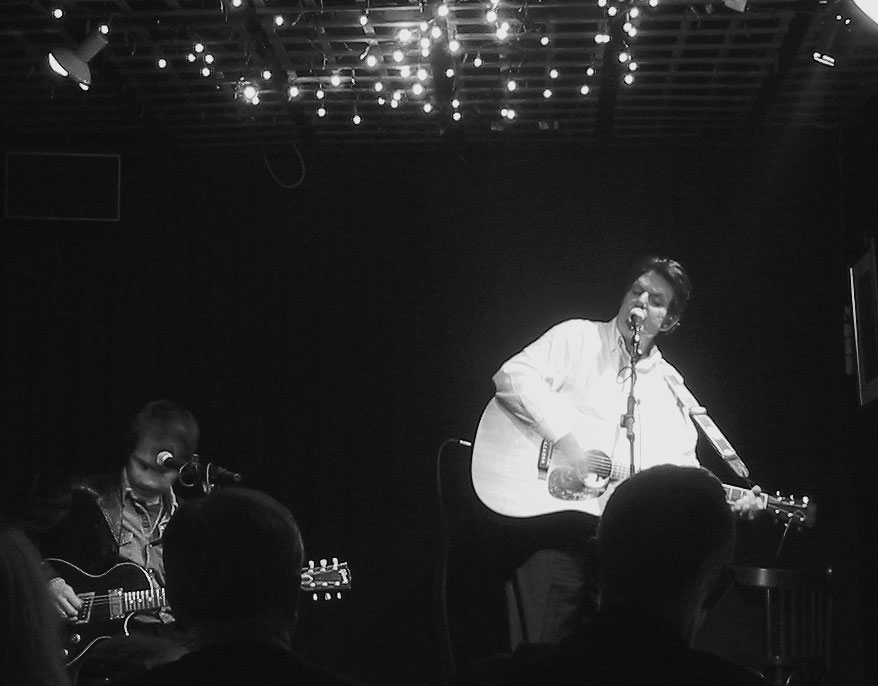
Sloan (right) performing with Duane Jarvis in 2007

After leaving Dunhill, Sloan recorded an album in 1968 titled Measure of Pleasure. It was produced by Tom Dowd and released by ATCO. In 1969, Sloan's "New Design" was included on the Ruby, Don't Take Your Love To Town album by Kenny Rogers and The First Edition. Sloan left the music scene due to numerous business and legal problems. He repeatedly reported that Dunhill made threatening advances to force him to sign away the rights to his valuable compositions and that the reason for his absence from the music scene was to battle illnesses. After 1969, he did not frequently record or perform until the new millennium. He finally found relief from his long illness with help from Indian guru Sathya Sai Baba. In 2006, describing this period away from the world, Sloan said, "I was ill I guess for a good 20, maybe 25 years. ... Catatonia for a long time."

Sloan released only two albums during this period: Raised on Records, released on Mums Records in 1972 while he was recovering from illness, and Serenade of the Seven Sisters, released on Pioneer Records in Japan in the early 1990s, because Sloan's From A Distance (from his second solo album) had been successful there. Positive response led to the Japanese album being released worldwide.

In 2005, Sloan made a series of recordings with producer Jon Tiven in Nashville, Tennessee. The resulting album, Sailover, was released in August 2006 on the Hightone Records label. Sailover was a veiled reference to the guru that helped him get well, proclaiming that Sloan was indeed a "Sai Lover". Tiven played guitar on the record and his wife Sally played bass. The album was a mix of classic and new compositions, including several new songs co-written with Tiven. Guests included Frank Black, Buddy Miller, Lucinda Williams, Felix Cavaliere, Tom Petersson and Gary Tallent.

In 2014, Sloan's final series of recordings appeared on his album titled My Beethoven. These recordings began when Sloan attended a concert in Los Angeles, featuring Beethoven compositions, that affected him deeply. He focused on fully understanding the similarities between the legendary composer and himself. This journey of discovery took him a full decade to complete. He learned to play and compose with a piano during the process. The work enabled him to heal the wounds that he encountered during the trials and tribulations of his life. This last musical project led to him forgiving his transgressors, leaving his anger behind him and moving forward with peace, love and serenity for the remainder of his life.

In 2015, Sloan published a book, co-written with S.E. Feinberg, entitled What's Exactly the Matter with Me? Memoirs of a Life in Music.

=== Death ===
Sloan died on November 15, 2015, at his home in Los Angeles, aged 70. He had pancreatic cancer for several months and his death was attributed to that disease.

== Hit songs as songwriter ==
Year	Song	Original artist	^{U.S. Hot 100}	Non-US Chart positions and Other versions
1964	"Kick That Little Foot Sally Ann"	Round Robin	61	
1964	"Summer Means Fun"	Bruce & Terry	72	The Fantastic Baggys (1964); Jan and Dean (1966)
1964	"One Piece Topless Bathing Suit"	The Rip Chords	96	Jan and Dean (1966)
1964	"Unless You Care"	Terry Black	99	No. 2 in Canada
1964	"What Am I Doing Here with You?"	Johnny Rivers	N/A	Bev Harrell (1967, Australia No. 13)
1965	"(Here They Come) From All Over the World"	Jan and Dean	56	No. 9 in Canada
1965	"I Found a Girl"	Jan and Dean	30	No. 2 in Canada
1965	"Eve of Destruction"	Barry McGuire	1	No. 1 in Canada, No. 3 in Britain. The Turtles (1970, US No. 100); P.F. Sloan (1965); The Grass Roots (1966); Dave Warner's From The Suburbs Dave Warner (1978); D.O.A. (1982); The Pretty Things (1989); The Screaming Jets (1997)
1965	"Let Me Be"	The Turtles	29	No. 14 in Canada. P.F. Sloan (1966)
1965	"Take Me for What I'm Worth"	The Searchers	76	P.F. Sloan (1965)
1965	"Child of Our Times"	Barry McGuire	72	
1965	"The Sins of a Family"	P.F. Sloan	87	Murray the K (1965)
1965	"Little Liar"	Terry Black	-	No. 10 in Canada
1965	"Blue Lipstick"	Patrician-Anne	-	No. 13 in Canada
1966	"A Must to Avoid"	Herman's Hermits	8	No. 3 in Canada, No. 6 in Britain
1966	"You Baby"	The Turtles	20	No. 11 in Canada. The Grass Roots (1966); The Mamas and the Papas (1966)
1966	"Where Were You When I Needed You"	The Grass Roots	28	No. 12 in Canada. Herman's Hermits (1966), The Bangles (1984), The Adult Net (1989, UK No. 66)
1966	"Secret Agent Man"	Johnny Rivers	3	No. 4 in Canada. Mel Tormé (1966); The Ventures (1966, US No. 54); Devo (1979), Bruce Willis (1987, UK No. 43), Blues Traveler (1995)
1966	"Only When You're Lonely"	The Grass Roots	96	
1966	"Can I Get to Know You Better"	The Turtles	89	
1967	"Another Day, Another Heartache"	The 5th Dimension	45	No. 41 in Canada
1967	"Things I Should Have Said"	The Grass Roots	23	No. 9 in Canada
1967	"Here's Where You Belong"	West Coast Pop Art Experimental Band		
1967	"Wake Up, Wake Up"	The Grass Roots	68	No. 18 in Canada

== Discography ==
=== Solo ===
==== Singles ====
Year	Song	Label
1959	"Little Girl in the Cabin" / "All I Want Is Lovin'"	Aladdin
1960	"If You Believe in Me" / "She's My Girl"	Mart
1965	"The Sins of a Family" (No. 87 on Billboard Hot 100)	Dunhill
1965	"Halloween Mary"	Dunhill
1966	"From a Distance"	Dunhill
1966	"City Women"	Dunhill
1966	"A Melody for You"	Dunhill
1967	"Sunflower Sunflower"	Dunhill
1967	"Karma (A Study of Divinations)" / "I Can't Help But Wonder, Elizabeth"	Dunhill
1969	"New Design"	ATCO
1972	"Let Me Be"	Mums

==== Albums ====
- Songs of Our Times (1965, Dunhill)
- Twelve More Times (1966, Dunhill)
- Measure of Pleasure (1968, ATCO)
- Raised on Records (1972, Mums)
- Precious Times: The Best of P.F. Sloan (1965–1966) (1986, Rhino)
- Songs of Other Times (1988, Big Beat)
- Anthology (1993, One Way/MCA)
- Serenade of the Seven * Sisters (1994, Pioneer)
- (Still On The) Eve Of Destruction (1997, All The Best)
- Child of Our Times: The Trousdale Demo Sessions 1965–1967 (2001, Varèse Sarabande)
- Sailover (2006, Hightone)
- Here's Where I Belong: The Best of the Dunhill Years 1965–1967 (2008, Big Beat)
- My Beethoven (2014, MsMusic)

=== With Steve Barri ===
==== Singles ====
Year	Band Name	Song	Label
1964	Themes Inc.	"Theme from Peyton Place (Allison's Theme)"	Vee Jay
1964	Phillip and Stephan	"When You're So Near You're So Far Away" / "Meet Me Tonight Little Girl"	Interphon
1964	Sheridan Hollenbeck	"Tokyo Melody"	Interphon
1964	The Wildcats	"The Swim"	Counsel
1964	The Lifeguards	"Swimtime USA"	Reprise
1964	The Street Cleaners	"That's Cool, That's Trash"	Amy
1964	The Rally-Packs	"Move Out, Little Mustang"	Imperial
1964	The Fantastic Baggys	"Tell 'Em I'm Surfin'"	Imperial
1964	The Fantastic Baggys	"Anywhere the Girls Are"	Imperial
1965	The Fantastic Baggys	"It Was I"	Imperial
1965	Willie and the Wheels	"Skateboard Craze"	Dunhill
1965	The Grass Roots	"Mr. Jones (Ballad of a Thin Man)"	Dunhill
1966	The Grass Roots	"Where Were You When I Needed You"	Dunhill
1966	The Grass Roots	"Only When You're Lonely"	Dunhill
1966	The Grass Roots	"Tip of My Tongue"	Dunhill
1967	The Grass Roots	"Let's Live for Today"	Dunhill
1967	The Grass Roots	"Things I Should Have Said"	Dunhill
1967	The Grass Roots	"Wake Up, Wake Up"	Dunhill

==== Albums ====
- Tell 'Em I'm Surfin' – The Fantastic Baggys (1964, Imperial)
- The Surfing Songbook – Rincon Surfside Band (1965, Dunhill)
- The Surfing Songbook – Willie and the Wheels (1965, RCA) (identical release)
- Where Were You When I Needed You – The Grass Roots (1966, Dunhill)
- Let's Live for Today – The Grass Roots (1967, Dunhill)

=== Reissues ===
Sloan's early work has been poorly represented on compact disc, with only a smattering of releases to his name. Measure of Pleasure was reissued on CD by Collectors' Choice in January 2007. There is a collection of his demo recordings available (Child of Our Times, on the Varèse Sarabande), and there was a now-out-of-print 1993 collection of his Dunhill recordings (Anthology, on the One Way label).

In 2008, UK-based Big Beat label did a near-definitive reissue of Sloan's solo recordings for Dunhill. Entitled Here's Where I Belong: The Best of the Dunhill Years 1965–1967, the CD omits the album tracks "When the Wind Changes" and "Patterns Seg. 4", while Sloan's final Dunhill recording, "I Can't Help But Wonder, Elizabeth", made its legal CD debut on this release.

== Eponymous song ==
"P.F. Sloan" is also a song by singer-songwriter Jimmy Webb, who is better known for the 1960s hits "By the Time I Get to Phoenix" and "Up, Up and Away".

Cover versions of the song were recorded by The Association in 1971, Jennifer Warnes, and by British band Unicorn in the early 1970s – released as a single and album track on Transatlantic Records. Jackson Browne performed the song with Webb on Webb's 2010 album Just Across the River. In 2012 it was covered by the British singer Rumer, who treated it as the signature song on her Boys Don't Cry album.

While Sloan's insistence on becoming a recording artist was an inspiration to fellow songwriter Webb, who had worked with Sloan with Bones Howe and The 5th Dimension, a personal dispute led Webb to deny the existence of "P.F. Sloan" when asked about the song's title character during an article interview, saying that he had made the name up. Eugene Landy laid claim to being the real P.F. Sloan when he was asked by reporters why he considered himself able to direct Brian Wilson's musical career. Landy claimed to have written the songs attributed to "P.F. Sloan".
