= Steve Barri =

American songwriter and record producer (born 1942)

- Born: Steven Barry Lipkin; February 23, 1942 (age 84); New York, New York, U.S.
- Genres: Blue-eyed soul; folk rock; pop rock
- Occupations: Songwriter; singer; producer
- Labels: Dunhill; ABC; Vee-Jay; Imperial; Warner Bros.; Motown

Steven Barry Lipkin (born February 23, 1942) is an American songwriter and record producer.

== Career ==
Early in his career, Barri was a staff writer with Dunhill Records. He produced such huge hits as "Dizzy" by Tommy Roe. As both songwriter and producer he frequently collaborated with P. F. Sloan, and the partners were responsible for the success of The Grass Roots and contributed largely to the band's first album. They co-produced the global hit version of Sloan's song "Eve of Destruction" – a 1965 United States number one song by Barry McGuire (originally from the New Christy Minstrels). Barri and Sloan co-wrote and/or co-produced many other hit records in the mid-1960s including "Let's Live for Today" by The Grass Roots (1967), "You Baby" by The Turtles, "A Must to Avoid" by Herman's Hermits and "Secret Agent Man" by Johnny Rivers. They also co-wrote "Unless You Care", which was recorded by Terry Black and reached no. 2 in Canada, and "Little Liar", which Black took to no. 10 in Canada. After his partner Sloan left Dunhill Records, Barri continued as producer for The Grass Roots until the early 1970s. Barri produced Mama Cass including her 1969 hits. Barri produced Hamilton, Joe Frank & Reynolds "Don't Pull Your Love"(1971), The Grass Roots "Two Divided Love"(1971) and "The Runway"(1972).

After Dunhill was acquired by ABC Records, Barri stayed on in the 1970s as head of Artists & Repertoire (A&R) where he focused on signing and producing new artists, such as pop group, Bo Donaldson and The Heywoods. He collaborated with songwriters Dennis Lambert and Brian Potter on three albums for the Four Tops, which included the million-selling single "Ain't No Woman (Like The One I've Got)". He also worked on several critically acclaimed albums by leading blues and soul singer Bobby Bland.

After ABC Records reorganized (in which they dissolved their subsidiary labels and moved all artists to the main ABC Records label) in 1975, Barri departed to become A&R chief at Warner Bros. Records. While there, he co-produced John Sebastian's 1976 album Welcome Back. He produced Rhythm Heritage's hit Theme from S.W.A.T. and Alan O'Day's 1977 number one single "Undercover Angel". Barri also produced O'Day's follow-up single "Skinny Girls", which went to number one in Australia. Barri moved in 1982 to Motown Records as vice-president of A&R, producing The Temptations and overseeing big-selling releases by Lionel Richie and Rick James, among others. He also re-worked the company's rich back-catalog, introducing the "Greatest Hits" series, before leaving in 1986.

Spells followed at Capitol Records (as a consultant), Left Bank Management, where he worked with acts including Richard Marx, Meat Loaf and Stephanie Mills, and at smooth jazz label, JVC. In 1998, Barri joined Gold Circle Entertainment/Samson Records as a producer and was promoted to senior vice president in 2001.

== As producer ==
- Barry McGuire, "Eve of Destruction" (1965)
- The Grass Roots, "Mr. Jones (Ballad of a Thin Man)" (1965)
- Johnny Rivers, "Secret Agent Man"(1966)
- P. F. Sloan, "From A Distance" (1966)
- The Grass Roots, "Where Were You When I Needed You" (1966)
- The Grass Roots, "Only When You're Lonely"
- The Grass Roots, "Tip of My Tongue"
- The Grass Roots, "Let's Live for Today"(1967)
- The Grass Roots, "Things I Should Have Said"
- The Grass Roots, "Wake Up, Wake Up"
- Dizzy", Tommy Roe(1969)
- Hamilton, Joe Frank & Reynolds, "Don't Pull Your Love"(1971)
- The Grass Roots, "Two Divided Love"(1971)
- The Grass Roots, "The Runway"(1972)
- Rhythm Heritage, Theme from S.W.A.T. (1976)
- Alan O'Day, "Undercover Angel"(1977)
- Alan O'Day, "Skinny Girls"
