= Dunhill Records =

American record label

- Parent company: Independent (1964–1967); ABC Records (1967–1975); Universal Music Group (catalog)
- Founded: 1964
- Founder: Lou Adler; Jay Lasker; Pierre Cossette; Bobby Roberts
- Defunct: 1975
- Status: Inactive
- Distributors: Geffen Records and Universal Music Enterprises
- Genre: Various
- Country of origin: U.S.

Dunhill Records was an American record label started in 1964 by Lou Adler, Jay Lasker, Pierre Cossette and Bobby Roberts as Dunhill Productions to release the music of Johnny Rivers on Imperial Records. It became a record label the following year and was distributed by ABC Records.

The first Dunhill single was "My Prayer/Pretty Please" (catalog D-4001) by Shelley Fabares, who was married to Adler at the time. In mid-1967 Adler sold his shares to ABC Records, creating ABC-Dunhill Records, after which he started yet another label Ode Records (which was first distributed by CBS and later by A&M Records). Until 1975, ABC continued to release records on the Dunhill label, after which all remaining artists were absorbed into the ABC Records roster before MCA Records bought the label outright in 1979.

Buluu Dunhill Records was an offshoot of the ABC/Dunhill days using catalog series B-73001 (45 RPM singles) and B-60001 (LP).

Today, the Dunhill catalog is managed by Geffen Records.

A later independent reissue label called Dunhill Compact Classics was formed in 1986 to reissue recordings on the new CD format. British American Tobacco, a UK tobacco company, sued the company because of the use of the "Dunhill" name, forcing the company to rename itself DCC Compact Classics.

== Dunhill label variations ==
- 1965–1968—Black label with DUNHILL in white outline letters inside yellow frame
- 1968—Same as above, but with the "abc" logo added in front of the DUNHILL logo
- 1968–1969—Black label with 3-compartment multi-color box consisting of smaller DUNHILL logo (now in white letters inside white frame) in the left hand box and the white circular "abc" logo and "RECORDS" in the right hand boxes
- 1969–1973—Same as above, but with the multicolor "DUNHILL" and "abc RECORDS" boxes separated
- 1973–1974—Black label with DUNHILL spelled out in children's blocks (followed by a block with the "abc" logo) in white box (This variation only lasted a few months before the label was changed back to the multi-color box logo in which both the "one box" and "two box" variations were used)
- 1974–1975—Yellow, orange, red and purple label with "abc Dunhill" ("abc" circle logo in black) in between two black lines
- White labels were used for most promotional issues.

== Dunhill (ABC/Dunhill) Records artists ==
- Ranji
- Steve Allen
- Andwella
- Attlee
- Bangor Flying Circus
- Birtha
- Hal Blaine
- Bobby Bland
- The Brass Ring
- Jimmy Buffett
- The Bully Boys Band
- Solomon Burke
- Avalanche
- Bush
- Eddie Cano and His Quintet
- Carmen
- Cashman & West
- Zach Clark
- Colosseum
- Danny Cox
- Denny Doherty
- Cass Elliot
- Shelley Fabares
- Mickie Finn
- Four Tops
- Ernie Freeman
- Fresh Start
- Giorgio
- Gladstone
- Grapefruit
- The Grass Roots
- Hamilton, Joe Frank & Reynolds
- The Happy Day Choir
- Richard Harris
- Roy Head
- Headstone
- The Hello People
- Thelma Houston
- Jamme
- John Kay
- Thomas Jefferson Kaye
- Andy Kim
- B. B. King & Bobby Bland
- The Artie Kornfeld Tree
- Kracker
- Dennis Lambert
- The Lamp of Childhood
- Richard Landis
- Locomotiv GT
- Magna Carta
- The Mamas & the Papas
- Kenneth Mars
- Tony Martin
- Gayle McCormick
- Barry McGuire
- Mighty Clouds of Joy
- Mrs. Miller
- Daniel Moore
- Murphy's Law
- Lady Nelson and the Lords
- Noah
- Michael Omartian
- Pacific Gas & Electric
- Freda Payne
- John Phillips
- Pratt & McClain
- Jim Price
- Pure Love & Pleasure
- Genya Ravan
- Rejoice!
- Rincon Surfside Band
- Emitt Rhodes
- The Road Home
- The Rock & Roll Revival
- William St. James
- Shango
- Del Shannon
- P. F. Sloan
- Smith
- Sonoma (band)
- Dusty Springfield
- The Stapleton-Morley Expression
- Steppenwolf
- Alex Taylor
- Three Dog Night
- Three's a Crowd
- Tribe
- The Trousdale Strings and the Dawn Chorale
- Van der Graaf Generator
- The John Verity Band
- Bengt Arne Wallin
- Joe Walsh
- Bobby Whitlock
- Wings (1968 band)
- Charles Wright
