= Juliana Hatfield discography =

- Studio albums: 19
- Extended plays: 3
- Soundtrack albums: 6
- Live albums: 1
- Compilation albums: 1
- Singles: 18

This is the discography for the solo work of rock musician Juliana Hatfield.

== Albums ==
=== Studio albums ===
Title	Album details	Peak chart positions			
Title	Album details	US	US Heat	US Indie	UK
Hey Babe	Released: March 17, 1992; Label: Mammoth Records	—	—	—	—
Become What You Are	Released: August 3, 1993; Label: Mammoth Records	119	1	—	44
Only Everything	Released: March 28, 1995; Label: Mammoth Records/Atlantic Records	96	—	—	59
Bed	Released: August 25, 1998; Label: Zoë Records	—	—	—	—
Beautiful Creature	Released: May 16, 2000; Label: Zoë Records/Island Records	—	—	—	—
Juliana's Pony: Total System Failure	Released: May 16, 2000; Label: Zoë Records/Island Records	—	—	—	—
In Exile Deo	Released: May 18, 2004; Label: Zoë Records	—	—	—	—
Made in China	Released: August 9, 2005; Label: Ye Olde Records	—	—	—	—
How to Walk Away	Released: August 19, 2008; Label: Ye Olde Records	—	—	—	—
Peace & Love	Released: February 16, 2010; Label: Ye Olde Records	—	—	—	—
There's Always Another Girl	Released: August 30, 2011; Label: Ye Olde Records	—	—	—	—
Juliana Hatfield	Released: August 28, 2012; Label: Ye Olde Records	—	—	—	—
Wild Animals	Released: August 2, 2013; Label: Ye Olde Records	—	—	—	—
Whatever, My Love	Released: February 17, 2015; Label: American Laundromat Records	—	—	37	—
Pussycat	Released: April 28, 2017; Label: American Laundromat Records	—	—	—	—
Juliana Hatfield Sings Olivia Newton-John	Released: April 13, 2018; Label: American Laundromat Records	—	15	38	—
Weird	Released: January 18, 2019; Label: American Laundromat Records	—	—	—	—
Juliana Hatfield Sings The Police	Released: November 15, 2019; Label: American Laundromat Records	—	—	13	—
Blood	Released: May 14, 2021; Label: American Laundromat Records	—	—	—	—
Juliana Hatfield Sings ELO	Released: November 17, 2023; Label: American Laundromat Records	—	—	—	—
Lightning Might Strike	Released: December 12, 2025; Label: American Laundromat Records	—	—	—	—

=== Live album ===
Title	Album details
The White Broken Line: Live Recordings	Released: November 21, 2006; Label: Ye Olde Records

=== Compilation album ===
Title	Album details
Gold Stars 1992–2002: The Juliana Hatfield Collection	Released: June 25, 2002; Label: Zoë Records

== EPs ==
Title	EP details
I See You	Released: January 1, 1992; Label: Mammoth Records
Forever Baby	Released: August 18, 1992; Label: Mammoth Records
Please Do Not Disturb	Released: October 21, 1997; Label: Bar/None Records
Sittin' in a Tree (with Frank Smith)	Released: May 29, 2007; Label: Ye Olde Records

== Singles ==
Title	Year	Peak chart positions			Album
Title	Year	US	US Alt.	UK	Album
"Everybody Loves Me But You"	1992	—	—	—	Hey Babe
"Forever Baby"	1992	—	—	—	Hey Babe
"I See You"	1992	—	—	—	Hey Babe
"My Sister"	1993	—	1	71	Become What You Are
"For the Birds"	1993	—	—	—	Become What You Are
"Spin the Bottle"	1994	97	—	83	Become What You Are
"Universal Heart-Beat"	1995	84	5	65	Only Everything
"What a Life"	1995	—	—	—	Only Everything
"Live On Tomorrow"	1995	—	—	—	Only Everything
"Bad Day"	1998	—	—	—	Bed
"Somebody Is Waiting for Me"	2000	—	—	—	Beautiful Creature
"Don't Rush Me"	2000	—	—	—	Beautiful Creature
"My Protégée"	2000	—	—	—	Juliana's Pony: Total System Failure
"Every Breath You Take"	2002	—	—	—	Gold Stars 1992–2002: The Juliana Hatfield Collection
"Because We Love You"	2004	—	—	—	In Exile Deo
"Stay Awake"	2005	—	—	—	Made in China
"This Lonely Love"	2008	—	—	—	How to Walk Away
"Shining On"	2008	—	—	—	How to Walk Away
"If I Could"	2014	—	—	—	Whatever, My Love
"Ordinary Guy"	2015	—	—	—	Whatever, My Love
"Christmas Cactus"	2020	—	—	—	Non-album single
"Scratchers"	2025	—	—	—	Lightning Might Strike

== Soundtrack appearances ==
Song	Year	Soundtrack
"Yeh, Yeh"	1992	Fathers & Sons
"Spin The Bottle"	1994	Reality Bites
"Make It Home"	1995	My So-Called Life
"Witches' Song"	1996	The Craft
"Trying Not to Think About It"	1998	Urban Legend
"Harder and Deeper"	2000	Condo Painting

== Collaborations and various artist appearances ==
Year	Title	Main Artist	Album
1990	"Can't Find Love"	Giant Sand	Swerve
1991	"That's Why Girls Cry"	Susanna Hoffs	When You're a Boy
1993	"Hot Burrito #1"	Belly	Baby Silvertooth
1994	"Across the Moon"	Juliana Hatfield and Exene Cervenka	Across the Moon (film)
1994	"My Drug Buddy"	Evan Dando and Juliana Hatfield	Rare On Air, Vol. 1
1995	"You Could Make a Killing"	Aimee Mann	I'm with Stupid
1995	"Amateur"	Aimee Mann	I'm with Stupid
1995	"Lights Are Changing"	Mary Lou Lord	Mary Lou Lord
1995	"Pig Heart"	Dumptruck	Days of Fear
1995	"Josie and the Pussycats"	Juliana Hatfield and Tanya Donelly	Saturday Morning: Cartoons' Greatest Hits
1995	"Waves"	Juliana Hatfield	Volume 13: The Lucky Issue
1995	"Here Comes the Pain"	Juliana Hatfield	This Is Fort Apache
1997	"Silly Goofball Poems"	Juliana Hatfield	Kerouac: Kicks Joy Darkness
1999	"$1,000 Wedding"	Evan Dando and Juliana Hatfield	Return of the Grievous Angel: A Tribute to Gram Parsons
2000	"Deathly"	Aimee Mann	Bachelor No. 2
2000	"Temptation of Egg"	Giant Sand	Chore of Enchantment
2000	"Up to You"	Juliana Hatfield	Listen 2 Kids
2001	"Keep On Crying"	Davíd Garza	Overdub
2002	"Closet of Dreams"	John Doe	Dim Stars, Bright Sky
2002	"Still You"	John Doe	Dim Stars, Bright Sky
2005	"Going Nowhere"	Juliana Hatfield	Too Many Years
2006	"Don't Lie to Me"	Juliana Hatfield	Big Star, Small World
2006	"Love Went Away"	Juliana Hatfield under the name Kelly Wilson	She Loves You Too
2006	"Cinderella Superstar"	Peter Gammons	Never Slow Down, Never Grow Old
2008	"Back to Freedom"	Juliana Hatfield	The Green Owl Comp: A Benefit for the Energy Action Coalition
2008	"I Wanna Take You Home"	Nada Surf	Lucky
2009	"We're Not in Charleston Anymore"	Juliana Hatfield	Ciao My Shining Star: The Songs of Mark Mulcahy
2010	"Night the Bells Rang"	Ryan Schmidt	Black Sheep, Run
2011	"Hard Fall Down"	Erich Luening	Red Flags
2011	"Hold Your Breath"	Erich Luening	Red Flags
2014	"Needle in the Hay"	Juliana Hatfield	I Saved Latin! A Tribute to Wes Anderson
2020	"Winter Western"	Local H	Lifers
2023	"Lotta Love"	Juliana Hatfield	Lotta Love b/w Give Me Strength
2026	Bets	Juliana Hatfield and Eric Payne	-
