= Juliana Hatfield Sings The Police =

Studio album by Juliana Hatfield
- Released: November 15, 2019
- Recorded: 2019
- Studio: Q Division, Somerville, Massachusetts, United States
- Genre: Alternative rock
- Length: 43:09
- Language: English
- Label: American Laundromat
- Producer: Juliana Hatfield

Juliana Hatfield chronology
Weird (2019)	Juliana Hatfield Sings The Police (2019)	Blood (2021)

Juliana Hatfield Sings The Police is a covers album by American alternative rock artist Juliana Hatfield, covering British rock band the Police. The album has been positively received by critics. It is the second of three such albums by Hatfield, following 2018's Juliana Hatfield Sings Olivia Newton-John and preceding 2023's Juliana Hatfield Sings ELO.

== Recording and release ==
Released in 2019, the collection follows 2018's Juliana Hatfield Sings Olivia Newton-John and was originally begun as a Phil Collins covers album. The Police had been a childhood favorite of Hatfield's and she chose to balance the group's biggest hits with more obscure songs. Hatfield announced the album on August 1, 2019, and previewed the album with her recording of "De Do Do Do, De Da Da Da". "Next to You" was released on September 25 to promote the album.

Her cover of "Every Breath You Take" previously appeared in a 2000 packaging of her albums Beautiful Creature and Juliana's Pony: Total System Failure that contained a third CD with "Every Breath You Take" and other enhancements and on the Japanese edition of Beautiful Creature.

== Critical reception ==
Professional ratings
Review scores
Source	Rating
AllMusic	3.5/5 stars
American Songwriter	3/5 stars
Paste	7.6/10
PopMatters	8/10
Under the Radar	8/10

According to the review aggregator Metacritic, Juliana Hatfield Sings the Police received "generally favorable reviews" based on a weighted average score of 75 out of 100 from six critic scores. A positive review from Paste's Andy Crump summed up the release as "an act of pop cultural interrogation for its own sake", praising it as a covers album that successful recontextualizes The Police's work as well as a good album on its own merit. In Under the Radar, Frank Valish wrote that Hatfield "one of the rarest of artists who is able to both revere and transcend the original compositions" and gave the album eight out of 10. The editorial staff of AllMusic Guide gave the album 3.5 out of five stars, with reviewer Stephen Thomas Erlewine praised the musical variety on the album and Hatfield's innovative take on the songs, calling the release, "fresh and alive, once again feeling like punk-inspired pop".

Chris Ingalls of PopMatters also gave the album eight out of 10 and particularly called out the variety of musicianship, summing up, "As she has demonstrated with this album as well as the Olivia Newton-John project, she's a musician who is dedicated to paying tribute to the music of her youth and finding new and interesting ways to present it". A muted review from American Songwriter's Hal Horowitz gave the release three out of five stars, writing, "This is a fun listen but also feels like a way for Hatfield to amuse herself, romping through a dozen interesting, far from essential interpretations of the Police's music in 45 minutes as she works on new material". Pablo Gorondi of AP News praised Hatfield's ability to choose a balance of songs and perform them with variety, calling future covers projects "a most welcome prospect".

== Track listing ==
All songs written by Sting, except where noted

1. "Can't Stand Losing You" – 3:09
2. "Canary in a Coalmine" – 2:49
3. "Next to You" – 3:59
4. "Hungry for You (J'aurais Toujours Faim De Toi)" – 3:14
5. "Roxanne" – 3:45
6. "Every Breath You Take" – 4:34
7. "Hole in My Life" – 4:24
8. "De Do Do Do, De Da Da Da" – 4:15
9. "Murder by Numbers" (Sting, Andy Summers) – 2:33
10. "Landlord" (Stewart Copeland, Sting) – 3:21
11. "Rehumanize Yourself" (Copeland, Sting) – 3:27
12. "It's Alright for You" (Copeland, Sting) – 3:39

== Personnel ==
- Juliana Hatfield – vocals, guitar, bass guitar (except where noted below), drums (except where noted below), keyboards, production, mixing

Additional personnel

- Chris Anzalone – drums on "Hole in My Life", "Murder by Numbers", "Landlord", "Rehumanize Yourself", and "It's Alright" for You"
- James Bridges – engineering, mixing, machine drum on "Roxanne"
- Daykamp Creative, Nicole Anguish – design, illustration
- Patrick DiCenso – mastering
- Ed Valauskas – bass guitar on "Canary in a Coalmine", "Hole in My Life", "Landlord", "Rehumanize Yourself", and "It's Alright for You"
