= Hey Baby =

Hey Baby may refer to:

- "Hey! Baby", a 1961 song by Bruce Channel, covered by Anne Murray in 1982 and DJ Ötzi in 2000
- "Hey Baby" (Dimitri Vegas & Like Mike and Diplo song), 2016
- "Hey Baby" (Marty Stuart song), 1993
- "Hey Baby" (No Doubt song), 2001
- "Hey Baby" (Sean Paul song), 2014
- "Hey Baby" (Ted Nugent song), 1975
- "Hey Baby (After the Club)", a song by Ashanti
- "Hey Baby (Drop It to the Floor)", a song by Pitbull
- "Hey Baby (Jump Off)", a song by Bow Wow and Omarion
- "Hey Baby (New Rising Sun)", a 1971 song by Jimi Hendrix
- "Hey Baby (They're Playing Our Song)", a song by the Buckinghams
- "Hey Baby", a 1977 song by J. J. Cale from Troubadour
- "Hey Baby", a 1989 song by Henry Lee Summer
- "Hey Baby", a 2006 song by Melleefresh and deadmau5
- "Hey Baby", a 2009 song by the Jonas Brothers from Lines, Vines and Trying Times
- "Hey Baby", a 2008 song by The Supremes from Let the Music Play: Supreme Rarities
- "Hey Baby", a 2016 song by Bubble Guppies from "Bubble Baby"

== See also ==
- Heyy Babyy, a 2007 Indian Hindi-language comedy film by Sajid Khan
- Hey Babe, an album by Juliana Hatfield
- Hey Babe! (disambiguation)
- "Hey Hey Baby", a 1965 song by T-Bone Walker
