= Up to You =

Up to You may refer to:

- Up to You (album), by Michi 2009
- Up to You (EP), by Canadian band Blue Peter 1982
- "Up to You", a song by Chris Brown from the 2011 album F.A.M.E.
- "Up to You", a song by Boz Scaggs from the 1971 album Boz Scaggs & Band
- "Up to You", a single by Toryn Green
- "Up to You", a song by Savatage from Streets: A Rock Opera
- "Up to You", a song by Yo La Tengo from Genius + Love = Yo La Tengo
- "Up to You", a song by David Kitt from Not Fade Away
- "Up to You", a song by FM from the 1980 album City of Fear
- "Up to You", a song by Sidewinder
- "Up to You", a song by Satoshi Ohno
- "Up to You", a song by Juliana Hatfield
- "Up to You", a song by Ivan Neville from the 1988 album If My Ancestors Could See Me Now

== See also ==
- UP2U, 1980s British children's television series
