= Hey Babe! =

Hey Babe! may refer to:

- Hey Babe! (1983 film), a musical drama film
- Hey Babe! (1999 film), a Filipino romantic comedy film
- Hey Babe, a 1992 album by Juliana Hatfield

== See also ==
- Hey Baby (disambiguation)
