= The White Broken Line: Live Recordings =

Live album by Juliana Hatfield
- Released: November 21, 2006
- Genre: Rock
- Length: 44:25
- Label: Ye Olde Records
- Producer: Tom Dube

Juliana Hatfield chronology
Made in China (2005)	The White Broken Line: Live Recordings (2006)	Sittin' in a Tree (2007)

The White Broken Line: Live Recordings is a live album by Juliana Hatfield, released in 2006. It was rated 3.5 stars by AllMusic.

== Track listing ==
All songs written by Juliana Hatfield

1. "Hotels" – 5:02
2. "Get In Line" – 3:19
3. "Oh" – 3:14
4. "Necessito" – 3:11
5. "Somebody Is Waiting For Me" – 3:13
6. "Rats in the Attic" – 3:24
7. "Choose Drugs" – 3:15
8. "Ten-Foot Pole" – 2:39
9. "My Sister" – 3:38
10. "Down On Me" – 2:56
11. "My Protégée" – 4:10
12. "Slow Motion / Because We Love You" – 6:29

Tracks 1,4,5,6 recorded at Paradise Rock Club, Boston, 2005.

Tracks 2,10,11 recorded at Pearl Street, Northampton, 2005.

Track 3 recorded at Avalon, Boston, 2005.

Tracks 7,8 recorded at Orpheum Theater, Boston, 2002.

Tracks 9,12 recorded at Maxwell's, Hoboken, 2005.

== Personnel ==
Musicians

- Juliana Hatfield - vocals, guitar
- Ed Velauskas - bass, backing vocals
- Pete Caldes - drums

Production

- Tom Dube - recording, mixing
