= Mikey Welsh =

American musician and painter (1971–2011)

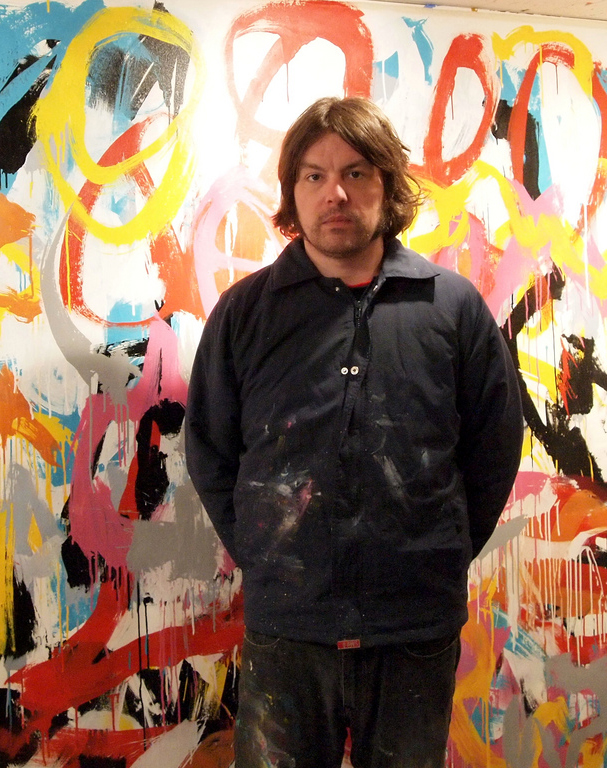
- Welsh in 2010

Background information
- Born: Michael Edward Welsh; April 20, 1971; Syracuse, New York, U.S.
- Died: October 8, 2011 (aged 40) Chicago, Illinois, U.S.
- Genres: Alternative rock; emo; pop-punk; power pop; indie rock
- Occupations: Musician; artist
- Instruments: Bass; guitar; vocals
- Years active: 1984–2011
- Labels: Geffen; Fenway; CherryDisc; Zoë; Bar/None
- Formerly of: Weezer; The Special Goodness; Verbena; The Kickovers; Homie

Michael Edward Welsh (April 20, 1971 – October 8, 2011) was an American artist and musician. Despite playing bass for several bands, he was best known for being a member of the rock band Weezer. During Weezer's hiatus, he played with Weezer frontman Rivers Cuomo in the band Homie, during Cuomo's time in Boston. Following original bassist Matt Sharp's departure from Weezer, Welsh joined as bassist and played with them from the time that they unofficially regrouped in 1998 until August 2001, when he experienced mental health problems. Shortly afterwards, he retired from music to focus on his painting career.

== Career ==
Michael Edward Welsh was born on April 20, 1971, in Syracuse, New York. He began his career as a Boston-area musician, playing in bands such as Heretix, Chevy Heston, Jocobono, Left Nut, and Slower. He was a touring bassist for Juliana Hatfield and Verbena. In 1997, he joined the first incarnation of the Rivers Cuomo Band, the side-project of Weezer frontman Rivers Cuomo. He joined Weezer following the departure of Matt Sharp in 1998.

During Weezer's hiatus, he played with Verbena and the first incarnation of Patrick Wilson's band the Special Goodness. He wrote a large number of basslines in this period, recorded them and sent them to Cuomo for writing inspiration, although Cuomo never used any of them. Instead, he contributed four of these to Juliana Hatfield's 2000 album Juliana's Pony: Total System Failure. Welsh was given a co-writing credit for four songs.

He toured with Weezer beginning with their resurgence in the summer of 2000 and first appeared on their limited edition Christmas CD EP later that year (re-released in 2005 as Winter Weezerland). He subsequently played on 2001's Green Album as well as a number of B-sides and unreleased songs from the era, and also performed with the band most of the way through tours supporting the album.

=== Mental illness and exit from Weezer ===
In 2001, Welsh suffered a breakdown brought on by drug use, undiagnosed mental health problems, and the strain of touring. After attempting suicide by drug overdose, he left Weezer. The reason for his departure was not made public until some time later. He was checked into a psychiatric hospital in August 2001. He later spoke about the ordeal in an interview with the website Rock Salt Plum:

Basically, a lifetime of doing drugs and being undiagnosed as having bipolar disorder, post-traumatic stress disorder, and borderline personality disorder finally caught up with me when I was 30 years old. At the beginning of a 3-month European tour with Weezer, I started slowly falling apart. Without getting too graphic, by the time the tour was winding up, my weight had gone down to about 140lbs (I'm 6'2") [63,5 kg – 1,88 m] and mentally completely wiped out. When I returned to the States, my family had made plans for me to see a psychiatrist in Boston. First though, we had to play a few dates around the U.S., and perform on The Tonite (sic) Show (which ended up being my last performance with Weezer). By the time I got to Boston, I was having a complete nervous breakdown. It ended with a severe suicide attempt (an overdose). I was found and rushed to the hospital where I had come to within minutes of my heart completely stopping. I was in a coma for a few days, and woke up in a lockdown psychiatric ward.

— Mikey Welsh, Feb. 2007 Rock Salt Plum Interview

Weezer shot a new version of the video for their song "Island in the Sun" without Welsh. Following Welsh's departure in 2001, the band hired Scott Shriner to replace Welsh.

=== Retirement from music ===
In late 2001/2002, Welsh returned to the Boston music scene by temporarily joining the Kickovers, the band of Nate Albert, guitarist for the Mighty Mighty Bosstones. In an interview, he expressed his distaste for the corporate music process, stating that, "It's actually fun to just be playing in the studio without some major-label idiot standing over your shoulder." Soon after, he retired from music to become a full-time artist. He, his wife and their two sons lived in Vermont.

Welsh attended a Weezer show on July 12, 2005, in Lewiston, Maine. Cuomo dedicated "Hash Pipe" to him, drawing cheers from the crowd. On September 2, 2010, he joined the band on stage at a show in Essex Junction, Vermont, to play bass on the song "Hash Pipe". It was the first time he had played with Weezer since 2001. Weezer members Wilson, Brian Bell, and Scott Shriner had arranged for Welsh to appear on stage in order to surprise Cuomo; the vocalist did not notice Welsh until partway through the song. On July 29, 2011, Welsh played guitar on the song "Undone" with Weezer and the Flaming Lips at a show in New York. It would ultimately be Welsh's final live performance.

=== Art career ===
Welsh became an artist and, as of August 2008, had 13 exhibitions of his artwork. He was a member of Outsider Art.

A quote from Welsh's official website explained his methods of creating his art:

Welsh attacks his canvases with pure spontaneity and aggression, almost never using a brush and preferring to work only with his hands and fingers. This technique gives him the opportunity to get as close and "inside" to his paintings as he needs to be. For him, this is a necessity. Welsh also works in sculpture, working with found objects. Constructing creatures out of broken and dismantled chairs and furniture, to vacuum hoses, Tupperware, wire, and rope. All painted with his usual explosion of color.

Welsh's artwork is featured on a Burton snowboard, in a line of snowboards titled "The Farm". He designed and painted the album cover for Twin Berlin's debut album.

== Death ==
On September 26, 2011, Welsh wrote on Twitter (now X): "dreamt i died in chicago next weekend (heart attack in my sleep). need to write my will today." On October 8, 2011, Welsh was found dead in a Chicago hotel room from a suspected heroin overdose. His death was not formally declared a suicide, despite his prior attempt by the same method.

== Discography ==
=== Left Nut ===
- 1990 – Bad Attitude No Apologies

=== Heretix ===
- 1993 – The Adventures of Superdevil

=== Jocobono ===
- 1995 – Jocobono

=== Juliana Hatfield ===
- 1997 – Please Do Not Disturb
- 1998 – Bed
- 2000 – Juliana's Pony: Total System Failure
- 2002 – Gold Stars 1992–2002: The Juliana Hatfield Collection

=== Weezer ===
- 2000 – Christmas CD
- 2001 – Weezer (Green Album)

=== The Kickovers ===
- 2002 – Osaka
