= Juliana Hatfield Sings ELO =

Studio album by Juliana Hatfield
- Released: November 17, 2023
- Length: 39:05
- Label: American Laundromat
- Producer: Juliana Hatfield

Juliana Hatfield chronology
Blood (2021)	Juliana Hatfield Sings ELO (2023)	Lightning Might Strike (2025)

Juliana Hatfield Sings ELO is the twentieth studio album by American alternative rock artist Juliana Hatfield, released on November 17, 2023, through American Laundromat. It is the third covers album from Hatfield, following Juliana Hatfield Sings Olivia Newton-John (2018) and Juliana Hatfield Sings The Police (2019) and features performances of songs by English rock band Electric Light Orchestra.

== Critical reception ==
Professional ratings
Review scores
Source	Rating
AllMusic	4/5 stars
American Songwriter	3.5/5 stars

According to the review aggregator Metacritic, Juliana Hatfield Sings ELO received "generally favorable reviews" based on a weighted average score of 78 out of 100 from six critic scores. AllMusic critic Stephen Thomas Erlewine wrote that Hatfield's album is successful for "balancing classic rock radio staples with deep cuts" and continued that by "choosing to transpose strings to guitar and voice helps Hatfield achieve a sense of intimacy while retaining a sense of romantic grandeur, a combination that gives Juliana Hatfield Sings ELO a distinctly warm and comforting feeling without succumbing to the pitfalls of nostalgia".

Writing for American Songwriter, Hal Horowitz stated that "Hatfield's less glossy approach displays sincerity and appreciation for Lynne's talents, maintaining his arrangements while keeping the sonics tougher, if far from raw". John Moore of Glide Magazine also praised the track choices for mixing classics with deep cuts and continued that Hatfield can "pay tribute to the bands that helped influence her sound without making a single apology for their massive global appeal". Andre Skinner of Spill Magazine rated this album an 8 out of 10, stating that "production-wise, the backing band lays down perfect tracks, letting Hatfield's vocals shine".

== Track listing ==
All songs written by Jeff Lynne.

1. "Sweet Is the Night" – 3:31
2. "Can't Get It Out of My Head" – 4:18
3. "Showdown" – 3:31
4. "Strange Magic" – 3:56
5. "Don't Bring Me Down" – 4:00
6. "Telephone Line" – 4:44
7. "Secret Messages" – 3:59
8. "Bluebird Is Dead" – 4:24
9. "From the End of the World" – 3:15
10. "Ordinary Dream" – 3:26

== Personnel ==
- Juliana Hatfield – guitar, keyboards, percussion, additional drums, vocals, recording, production
- Nicole Anguish – design, illustration
- Chris Anzalone – drums/recording
- James Bridges – recording
- Andy Chase – recording
- Jed Davis – drum programming
- Patrick DiCenso – mixing
- Sean Glonek – mastering
- Ed Valauskas – bass guitar, recording, editing, photography

== See also ==
- 2023 in American music
- List of 2023 albums
