= Gold Stars 1992–2002: The Juliana Hatfield Collection =

Gold Stars 1992-2002: The Juliana Hatfield Collection

Greatest hits album by Juliana Hatfield
- Released: June 25, 2002
- Recorded: 1992–2002
- Genre: Rock
- Length: 73:33
- Label: Zoë
- Producer: Gary Smith; Scott Litt; Paul Q. Kolderie; Sean Slade; Juliana Hatfield; Andy Kravtiz; Tom Dube

Juliana Hatfield chronology
Juliana's Pony: Total System Failure (2000)	Gold Stars 1992-2002: The Juliana Hatfield Collection (2002)	In Exile Deo (2004)

Professional ratings
Review scores
Source	Rating
AllMusic	2.5/5 stars

Gold Stars 1992–2002: The Juliana Hatfield Collection is a greatest hits album by Juliana Hatfield, released in 2002. It also includes previously unreleased recordings.

== Track listing ==
All songs written by Juliana Hatfield except where noted

1. "Everybody Loves Me But You"
2. "My Sister"
3. "Spin The Bottle"
4. "Universal Heart-Beat"
5. "Fleur De Lys"
6. "Mountains Of Love" from the unreleased album God's Foot
7. "Fade Away" from the unreleased album God's Foot
8. "Sellout"
9. "Live It Up"
10. "Sneaking Around"
11. "Somebody Is Waiting For Me"
12. "Cry In The Dark"
13. "Houseboy" (Juliana Hatfield, Mikey Welsh)
14. "My Protégée"
15. "Every Breath You Take" (Sting)
16. "Only Love Can Break Your Heart" (Neil Young)
17. "Don't Walk Away"
18. "Your Eyes"
19. "We Will Rise Again"
20. "Table For One" (Juliana Hatfield, Brian Vander Ark)
