= Some Girls (band) =

American indie rock band

Some Girls is an American indie rock trio formed in 2001, and composed of Juliana Hatfield (guitar and vocals), Heidi Gluck (electric bass guitar, keyboards, harmonica, lap steel guitar and vocals) and Freda Love Smith (drums and vocals). Hatfield and Love Smith knew each other from the Blake Babies and wanted to write songs together. The group's songs are generally melodic, upbeat, and lighthearted.

The group released their first album, Feel It, in 2003 and toured the United States. Their second album, Crushing Love, was released in July 2006 on Koch Records. The release includes a DVD containing tour and studio footage.

== Discography ==
=== Studio albums ===
Year	Album details
2003	Feel It: Released: September 9, 2003; Label: Koch Records
2006	Crushing Love: Released: July 11, 2006; Label: Koch Records

=== Singles ===
Year	Title	Album
2003	"Necessito"	Feel It
2006	"Hooray for L.A."	Crushing Love
