= Crushing Love =

Studio album by Some Girls
- Released: July 11, 2006
- Genre: Alternative rock
- Length: 49:31
- Label: Koch
- Producer: Some Girls, Tony Whitlock, Andy Fry

Some Girls chronology
Feel It (2003)	Crushing Love (2006)

Professional ratings
Review scores
Source	Rating
Allmusic	4./5 stars

Crushing Love is the second studio album by Some Girls, released in 2006 (see 2006 in music).

== Track listing ==
No.	Title	Writer(s)	Length
1.	"Is This What I've Been Waiting For?"	Freda Love, Jake Smith	3:53
2.	"Poor Man's You"	Juliana Hatfield	2:52
3.	"Partner in Crime"	Love, Smith, Kenny Childers	3:44
4.	"Hooray For L.A."	Hatfield	4:05
5.	"Social Control"	Hatfield	3:05
6.	"On My Own Again"	Heidi Gluck	4:32
7.	"Stars In My Dreams"	Hatfield	2:08
8.	"Rock Or Pop?"	Hatfield, Smith	2:49
9.	"Live Alone"	Gluck, Andy Fry	4:17
10.	"Just Like That"	Joe Keefe	2:34
11.	"He's On Drugs Again" (Sardina cover)	LonPaul Ellrich	5:39
12.	"Never Really Mine"	Love	3:40
13.	"Kill The Bottle"	Hatfield, Love, Smith	3:27
14.	"Magnetic Fields"	Smith	2:54
Total length:			49:31

== Personnel ==
- Juliana Hatfield - vocals, guitars, keyboards and harmonica
- Heidi Gluck - bass, vocals, lap steel, keyboards and guitar on "Live Alone"
- Freda Love - drums and vocals
- Jake Smith - additional guitar on "Magnetic Fields" and backing vocals on "Is This What I've Been Waiting For?"
- Josh Berwanger - banjo on "On My Own Again"
- Tony Whitlock - recorder on "Rock Or Pop?"

== Production ==
- Producer: Some Girls, Tony Whitlock and Andy Fry
- Engineer: Tony Whitlock, Andy Fry and Vess Ruhtenberg
- Mixing: Paul Q. Kolderie
- Mastering: Jonathan Wyner
- Design: Burton Parker for Blue Collar Press
- Photography: Josh Berwanger
