= Forever Baby =

EP by Juliana Hatfield
- Released: August 18, 1992
- Genre: Alternative rock
- Label: Mammoth Records
- Producer: Gary Smith

Professional ratings
Review scores
Source	Rating
AllMusic	4/5 stars

Forever Baby is an EP recording by Juliana Hatfield released in 1992.

== Track listing ==
All tracks are written by Juliana Hatfield, except "Raisans" which was written by Joseph Mascis.

No.	Title	Length
1.	"Forever Baby"	3:05
2.	"Nirvana"	4:07
3.	"Everybody Loves Me But You"	3:36
4.	"Raisans"	3:35
5.	"Tamara"	2:58
Total length:		17:31

== Personnel ==
- Juliana Hatfield – vocals, guitar, bass guitar
- Todd Phillips – drums
- Mike Leahy – guitar (tracks 1, 3)

== Production ==
- Gary Smith – producer (tracks 1, 2, 3)
- Jay Faires, Steve Balcom – executive producers
- Sean Slade – recorded tracks 4, 5
