= Juliana Hatfield Sings Olivia Newton-John =

Studio album by Juliana Hatfield
- Released: April 13, 2018
- Studio: Q Division Studios (Somerville, Massachusetts)
- Genres: Alternative rock, indie rock
- Length: 51:54
- Label: American Laundromat
- Producer: Juliana Hatfield

Juliana Hatfield chronology
Pussycat (2017)	Juliana Hatfield Sings Olivia Newton-John (2018)	Weird (2019)

Juliana Hatfield Sings Olivia Newton-John is the sixteenth studio album by American singer-songwriter Juliana Hatfield. It was released on April 13, 2018, by American Laundromat Records. It's a tribute album to Australian singer Olivia Newton-John, in which Hatfield covers thirteen songs sung by Newton-John, most of them originally released as singles. From every sale of the album, one dollar will be donated to the Olivia Newton-John Cancer Wellness & Research Centre, Newton-John's own cancer treatment organization. The following year, Hatfield released Juliana Hatfield Sings The Police and Juliana Hatfield Sings ELO followed in 2023.

== Background and development ==
"I have never not loved Olivia Newton-John. Her music has brought me so much pure joy throughout my life. I loved her when I was a child and I love her still. Her voice and her positive energy and her melodies have stood the test of time and they give me as much pleasure now as they ever did. Listening to her is an escape into a beautiful place. She has inspired me so much personally and I just wanted to give something back; to share some of these tremendous songs, reinterpreted, with love, by me."

— Hatfield on recording Juliana Hatfield Sings Olivia Newton-John.

Hatfield started considering making an album of Olivia Newton-John songs after she purchased a ticket to see her concert (which was postponed later due to Newton-John's cancer diagnosis). The singer declared she "approached [the songs] from a serious place" and recorded the album "for myself and for other people who love her [Newton-John]", whom she considers a personal musical idol since childhood. She also wanted to do "something more light and positive" after her previous release, Pussycat (2017), which according to her has much negativity and helplessness feelings. Most of the songs covered on Juliana Hatfield Sings Olivia Newton-John were originally released by Newton-John on five specific albums Hatfield owned when she was a girl, and they were "very big in [her] life": Don't Stop Believin' (1976), Grease (1978), Totally Hot (1978), Xanadu (1980), and Physical (1981). Hatfield stayed closer to the original recordings in most songs, since she didn't want to disrespect them and "there was no need for mess up too much", but sometimes took some liberties to adapt them to her own style, most notably on "Totally Hot", "Dancin' 'Round and 'Round", and "Make a Move on Me". The singer considered the recording process "really challenging" and "pretty complex" and even considered quitting it occasionally.

Hatfield also worked on a version of "Suddenly", which she was planning to sing with another singer, but put it aside after she thought it was becoming too complicated. She wanted to cover "Never Enough" as well but forgot to include the song when she was recording the album.

== Release and promotion ==
Juliana Hatfield Sings Olivia Newton-John was released on April 13, 2018, with orange cassette, yellow cassette, CD, translucent orange vinyl and pink vinyl editions. To promote the album, Hatfield released accompanying music videos for the songs "A Little More Love" and "Physical" on January 31 and March 1, 2018, respectively. The singer also performed a one-off concert on April 6, 2018 in Somerville, Massachusetts, where she performed most of the songs from the album. Juliana Hatfield Sings Olivia Newton-John release also coincided with the limited-edition vinyl reissue of Hatfield's debut album Hey Babe.

== Reception ==
Professional ratings
Aggregate scores
Source	Rating
Metacritic	65/100
Review scores
Source	Rating
AllMusic	4/5 stars
Under the Radar	7/10 stars
Albumism	5/5 stars

At Metacritic, which assigns a normalized rating out of 100 to reviews from mainstream critics, Juliana Hatfield Sings Olivia Newton-John received an average score of 65, based on 4 reviews, which indicates "generally favorable reviews". Newton-John herself praised Hatfield's renditions. Allmusic writer Stephen Thomas Erlewine felt the album is "simply a love letter" and a "testament to the power of fandom." He also praised Hatfield's musical skills, stating that she "is a sharp record-maker, understanding when to let harmonies pile up and when to let analog keyboards set the tone, a gift that turns [the album] into a sumptuous aural pleasure." Ian Rushbury from Under the Radar rated the album 7 out of 10, calling Juliana Hatfield Sings Olivia Newton-John a "great piece of work" and "a really strong collection of songs that just happen to come from an unlikely source." Ross Horton of The Line of Best Fit wrote that "Hatfield shows such a love for the source material on what is essentially a tribute/covers album that the songs seem like they were written for her. [...] The song selection here is fantastic, and what she does with the originals is a complete revelation." Newsday's Glenn Gamboa described the album as "a match made in female-rocker heaven", which "serves as a reminder of the barriers the Aussie singer broke through in the ’70s." The Spill Magazine writer Aaron Badgley opined that "the album would have benefited from Hatfield putting her own distinct spin on some of the songs" but it is, "overall, a sincere tribute from one artist to another."

== Track listing ==
All songs produced by Juliana Hatfield.

No.	Title	Writer(s)	Length
1.	"I Honestly Love You"	Jeff Barry, Peter Allen	3:24
2.	"Suspended in Time"	John Farrar	3:56
3.	"Have You Never Been Mellow"	Farrar	3:33
4.	"A Little More Love"	Farrar	3:39
5.	"Magic"	Farrar	4:27
6.	"Physical"	Steve Kipner, Terry Shaddick	3:44
7.	"Totally Hot"	Farrar	4:30
8.	"Don't Stop Believin'"	Farrar	3:54
9.	"Please Mr. Please"	Bruce Welch, John Rostill	3:26
10.	"Hopelessly Devoted to You"	Farrar	2:50
11.	"Xanadu"	Jeff Lynne	3:26
12.	"Dancin' 'Round and 'Round"	Adam Mitchell	2:49
13.	"Make a Move on Me"	Farrar, Tom Snow	3:42
14.	"I Honestly Love You" (Reprise)	Barry, Allen	4:43
Total length:			51:54

== Bonus single ==
A bonus 7-inch vinyl single was also released on the same day of the album by American Laundromat. With a cover art illustration by Paul Westerberg depicting Newton-John during her Toomorrow days, it presents two additional cover songs not featured on the album.

All songs produced by Hatfield.

No.	Title	Writer(s)	Length
1.	"Deeper Than the Night"	Snow, Johnny Vastano	3:33
2.	"Heart Attack"	Kipner, Paul Bliss	2:28
Total length:			6:01

== Personnel ==
- Nicole Anguish – design
- James Bridges – engineering
- Pete Caldes – drums
- Pat DiCenso – engineering, mixing
- Sean Glonek – mastering
- Juliana Hatfield – vocals, producer, guitar, keyboard, bass, drums
- Scott Litt – mixing
- Clif Norrell – mix assistant
- Ed Valauskas – bass

== Charts ==
Chart (2018)	Peak position
US Independent Albums (Billboard)	38
US Heatseekers Albums (Billboard)	15

== Release history ==
Region	Date	Formats	Label	Ref.
United States	April 13, 2018	cassette; CD; digital download; LP	American Laundromat Records	
