= Lightning Might Strike =

Studio album by Juliana Hatfield
- Released: December 12, 2025
- Studio: American Laundromat Records Inc.
- Genre: Indie rock
- Length: 41:09
- Label: American Laundromat
- Producer: Juliana Hatfield

Juliana Hatfield chronology
Juliana Hatfield Sings ELO (2023)	Lightning Might Strike (2025)

Lightning Might Strike is a 2025 studio album by American alternative rock musician Juliana Hatfield. The album was recorded and produced by Hatfield at her home studio near Amherst, Massachusetts. Bass by Ed Valauskas and drums by Chris Anzalone were both recorded remotely and subsequently added at mixing.

== Critical reception ==
Reviews of Lightning Might Strike concentrated on how the album continued a defined sonic atmosphere that one reviewer called the "Juliana Hatfield sound". They remark on how with her sound, Hatfield has established a musical genre of her own over three decades, basically one that combines pleasant, memorable pop melodies with anxious, therapeutic lyrics that navigate modern human relations, made unique through Hatfield's sweet and youthful sounding voice.

After noting some life changes Hatfield went through since releasing her previous album Juliana Hatfield Sings ELO, critics were pleased to find that sound intact as the singer explored her jarred mental outlook. Hatfield moved from densely populated and busy Cambridge, Massachusetts to a rural home near Amherst, suffered loss of a pet, and went through a stressful family medical situation while preparing the album.

The record's title refers in part to the death of Hatfield's mother's brother, who at sixteen years old was struck and killed by lightning. In dealing with the tumult associated with moving from Cambridge to Western Massachusetts, Hatfield mentions that death as grounding her thoughts while making the album:

I’ve always thought that fate is a powerful force in my life. We can’t control our fates and that’s where the title originates. In the bigger picture, it’s about being grateful for what we have and about finding balance. It’s a reminder to myself not to give up on my dreams but also not to be an idiot and think that I deserve wonderful things. Somewhere in the middle is probably the more realistic thing.

Having that attitude resulted in songs that sound pleasing, while the song titles do not. Critics listed "Fall Apart", "Long Slow Nervous Breakdown", "My House Is Not My Dreamhouse", and "Ashes" as in that mode. "Scratchers" again offers a situation ruled by fate, as Hatfield describes buying lottery tickets at her mother's request, and muses over the excitement thinking about what happiness could result, while also thinking about the possibility lightning might strike.

One element of Hatfield's music that persisted in spite of the house move was the sound available with use of the mellotron, a 1960s era tape sampling machine that was used in songs such as "Strawberry Fields Forever" by the Beatles, the Rolling Stones' "She's a Rainbow", and "Wonderwall" by Oasis in 1995. The musician revealed she had replaced the bulky instrument she had access to in Cambridge with a microKORG synthesizer with a built-in mellotron emulator.

== Track listing ==
All songs by Juliana Hatfield

1. "Fall Apart" - 3:38
2. "Long Slow Nervous Breakdown" - 2:30
3. "Popsicle" - 3:20
4. "My House Is Not My Dream House" - 3:36
5. "Harmonizing With Myself" - 3:31
6. "Scratchers" - 3:31
7. "Constant Companion" - 4:01
8. "Where Are You Now" - 3:53
9. "Strong Too Long" - 3:27
10. "Wouldn't Change Anything" - 4:09
11. "Ashes" - 2:55
12. "All I've Got" - 2:38

== Personnel ==
Credits adapted from the album's liner notes.

- Juliana Hatfield – vocals, guitars, keyboards, percussion, bass (2, 3, 6), illustrations, photography
- Ed Valauskas – bass (1, 4–12)
- Chris Anzalone – drums
- Pat DiCenso – mixing, mastering
- Jed Davis – design, layout
