= Weird (album) =

Studio album by Juliana Hatfield
- Released: January 18, 2019
- Studio: Q Division (Somerville)
- Genres: Alternative rock, indie rock
- Length: 37:44
- Label: American Laundromat

Juliana Hatfield chronology
Juliana Hatfield Sings Olivia Newton-John (2018)	Weird (2019)	Juliana Hatfield Sings The Police (2019)

Professional ratings
Aggregate scores
Source	Rating
Metacritic	74/100
Review scores
Source	Rating
AllMusic	4/5 stars
Paste	7.3/10
Under the Radar	8/10

Weird is the seventeenth studio album by American singer-songwriter Juliana Hatfield. It was released on January 18, 2019, through American Laundromat Records. She began working on the record after wrapping up Juliana Hatfield Sings Olivia-Newton-John. "I had a lot of musical ideas. I went back into the studio and recorded a bunch of music," she said in a 2019 interview about the album. "I took a month or two off to write lyrics. I don’t usually work like that. I usually have full songs written, but I just felt like I wanted to do things a little differently. What emerged was a portrait of my life right now, which is pretty solitary and slightly isolated but not unpleasantly so. I was exploring what it’s like to be alone a lot of the time. It’s not necessarily a bad thing. Sometimes it could be a very good thing."

== Track listing ==
All tracks are written by Juliana Hatfield.

Weird track listing
No.	Title	Length
1.	"Staying In"	3:52
2.	"It's So Weird"	3:16
3.	"Sugar"	2:57
4.	"Everything's for Sale"	3:27
5.	"All Right, Yeah"	2:25
6.	"Broken Doll"	3:18
7.	"Receiver"	3:43
8.	"Lost Ship"	3:34
9.	"Paid to Lie"	3:23
10.	"No Meaning"	3:27
11.	"Do It to Music"	4:22
Total length:		37:44

== Personnel ==
Credits adapted from the album's liner notes.

- Juliana Hatfield – direction, guitars, bass, keyboards, vocals (all tracks); drums (tracks 2, 3, 8, 11)
- James Bridges – engineering, mixing
- Sean Glonek – mastering
- Jed Davis – design, layout
- Freda Love Smith – drums (1, 6)
- Todd Phillips – drums (4, 5, 7, 9, 10)
