= Caulfield Sisters =

The Caulfield Sisters
- Origin: Brooklyn, New York, U.S.
- Genres: Alternative; Indie rock Shoegaze
- Years active: 2000–present
- Label: American Laundromat
- Spinoff of: Pee Shy
- Members: Cindy Wheeler; Mary Catherine Guidera; Kristin Mueller
- Past members: Aaron Kant

The Caulfield Sisters (2000–present) is a critically praised independent band based in Brooklyn, New York, noted at times for their sonic similarity to Throwing Muses or Galaxie 500. They have appeared at the annual CMJ music festival in New York, were featured in the New York art magazine Esopus and in an April 2005 live performance on Seattle independent radio station KEXP, and have performed with bands such as Interpol.

== History ==
=== Founding ===
Lead singer, accordionist and guitar player Cindy Wheeler founded the Caulfield Sisters with bass player and backup vocalist Mary Catherine Guidera following the break-up of their former band Pee Shy in 1998. Wheeler and Guidera also briefly led a three-person band called 3 Wheeler immediately after Pee Shy broke up, and recorded a Mercury-financed demo recording under that name in 1998–99. The duo soon added Aaron Kant as drummer; Kristin Mueller took his place in 2004.

Name

The Caulfield Sisters take their name from Phoebe Caulfield, the sister of Holden Caulfield in J. D. Salinger's novel The Catcher in the Rye. As Wheeler explained in one radio interview: "After Pee Shy split, Mary and I took a little time off and then we missed playing together really badly. She was living up in Connecticut at the time, and I used to travel up there on the weekends to write songs with her. The whole vibe up there is very sort of Catcher in the Rye, very New England, melancholy, dreary, and it sort of lent itself to the songwriting we were doing." On the Sisters' website, they elaborate: "The Caulfield Sisters are the musical metaphor of Phoebe, the little sister of Salinger’s anti-hero Holden Caulfield; Holden’s Phoebe, the little sister as savior, a glimmer of hope in a blue coat, a sonic swirl, a beautiful blur that keeps whirling past you on the Merry-go-round."

Wheeler said her high school in Tennessee had banned Salinger's novel from its library because of its strong language; she had to get written permission from her parents before the librarian was allowed to give her a copy. Guidera, who chose the band's name, has said she had become "obsessed" with the book after reading it as an adult.

=== Releases ===
While Pee Shy had released two albums on Mercury Records, Wheeler has since referred to her experience with the major label as "Mercury poisoning," and the Sisters have recorded and released their music independently. The Connecticut-based label American Laundromat Records distributed a Caulfield Sisters EP in 2004 and released a split 7-inch in December 2006 with the French musician Julie Peel.

In November 2006, American Laundromat Records released one of 3 Wheeler's songs, "The First Bridge of Summer," as a bonus track to the Caulfield Sisters' EP Say It With Fire on the online music service iTunes. A year later, the label issued an iTunes-only release of all the 3 Wheeler songs in a five-song EP called The Deal Breaker Demos.

Meanwhile, the Sisters entered an extended hiatus in July 2005, when Guidera gave birth to a daughter, Eleanor Louise; during that period, Wheeler has performed in the bands Look It and The Forest For the Trees and in a side project called Musical Typing, all of them with Mercury Rev flutist Suzanne Thorpe. The Caulfield Sisters returned to live performing with a show on September 8, 2007, at Don Hill's in Manhattan.

In addition to her musical endeavors, Wheeler is a co-owner of the vintage clothing store Beacon's Closet, which has locations in Williamsburg and Park Slope in Brooklyn. Mueller is a drummer for several other New York City bands, most notably Gloria Deluxe, and released a solo album, Ports of Call, in 2006.

== Members ==
Current

- Cindy Wheeler (guitar, accordion, lead vocals)
- Mary Catherine Guidera (bass, vocals)
- Kristin Mueller (drums, 2004–present)

Past

- Aaron Kant (drums, 2001–03)

== Discography ==
=== Albums ===
- 2003: Songs for Phoebe (demo)
- 2004: Say It With Fire EP (American Laundromat Records, or ALR)
- 2007: The Deal Breaker Demos EP (ALR)

=== Singles ===
- 2005: "Judy" - Esopus compilation CD
- 2005: "Please, Please, Please Let Me Get What I Want" - cover of The Smiths on compilation High School Reunion (ALR)
- 2006: "Some Candy Talking" - cover of Jesus and Mary Chain on limited edition 7" blue vinyl split (ALR)
- 2011: "Two Songs From Mohawk" (ALR)
