= Blood (Juliana Hatfield album) =

Studio album by Juliana Hatfield
- Released: May 14, 2021
- Recorded: 2020
- Studio: Hatfield's home (Massachusetts)
- Genres: Indie rock; pop rock
- Length: 33:30
- Label: American Laundromat
- Producers: Juliana Hatfield; Jed Davis

Juliana Hatfield chronology
| Juliana Hatfield Sings The Police (2019) | Blood (2021) | Juliana Hatfield Sings ELO (2023) |

[Blood is] a reaction to how seriously and negatively a lot of people have been affected by the past four years. But it’s fun, musically. There’s a lot of playing around.

Blood is a 2021 studio album by American alternative rock musician Juliana Hatfield. The album was recorded by Hatfield in her home during the COVID-19 pandemic, with subsequent studio overdubs and mixing and focuses on themes of violence and retribution. The release was preceded by the single "Mouthful of Blood".

== Critical reception ==
Frankie Valish of Under the Radar rated this release a seven out of 10, citing the violent themes, some "perfectly jarring" music, and calling this "one of Hatfield's most experimental albums in years". Writing for PopMatters, Ian Rushbury scored this album a six out of 10, noting that Hatfield has relied on collaborators to make music in the past, and this album relies too much on her solo effort, leading to an album collection where "she’s forgotten to pack enough decent tunes". The editorial board of AllMusic Guide scored Blood four out of five stars, calling it the Best of 2021, with reviewer Stephen Thomas Erlewine praising the home recording approach, as well as Hatfield's varied sounds and emotions on the recording, resulting in a tension that "isn't merely provocative" but also "nourishing". Erin Osmon interviewed Hatfield for The Guardian and characterized Blood as full of "complex emotions [turned] into tuneful, three-minute vignettes", calling it an excellent album.

== Track listing ==
All tracks are written by Juliana Hatfield, except "The Shame of Love" and "Suck It Up" (Hatfield, Jed Davis).

| No. | Title | Length |
|---|---|---|
| 1. | "The Shame of Love" | 4:48 |
| 2. | "Gorgon" | 3:47 |
| 3. | "Nightmary" | 2:54 |
| 4. | "Had a Dream" | 2:56 |
| 5. | "Splinter" | 2:58 |
| 6. | "Suck It Up" | 3:10 |
| 7. | "Chunks" | 3:05 |
| 8. | "Mouthful of Blood" | 3:07 |
| 9. | "Dead Weight" | 3:33 |
| 10. | "Torture" | 3:08 |
| Total length: | | 33:30 |

== Personnel ==
Credits adapted from the album's liner notes.

- Juliana Hatfield – vocals, guitars, production (all tracks); bass guitar (tracks 1–5, 8–10), keyboards (1–3, 5, 6, 8–10), drum set (2, 3, 5, 7–10), clavinet (6), distorted bass guitar (7), illustrations, photography
- Jed Davis – drum programming (1, 4–9), production (1, 4, 6, 7, 9), bass synthesizer (1, 4, 6, 7), keyboards (1, 4, 6, 9), cowbell (4), design, layout
- James Bridges – mixing
- Sean Glonek – mastering

== See also ==
- List of 2021 albums (January–June)
