= Get There (Minor Alps album) =

Studio album by Minor Alps (band) Juliana Hatfield Matthew Caws
- Released: October 29, 2013
- Recorded: Hoboken, New Jersey
- Genre: Pop rock
- Length: 40:05
- Label: Barsuk Records

Get There is a studio album collaboration by American singer-songwriter Juliana Hatfield and Matthew Caws (lead singer of the band Nada Surf) under the band name Minor Alps. It was released on October 29, 2013, by Barsuk Records.

== Background ==
Juliana Hatfield and Matthew Caws, friends and infrequent collaborators since the early 1990s—they met at some Nada Surf shows—decided to form a band together and work on a project that is this resulting record.

The name of the band, Minor Alps, is a reference to the location of a cottage Caws' parents owned in France near Mont Ventoux. Caws described the mountain as a "minor alp" to a friend, and the expression stuck in his mind. "In the tradition of Iron Butterfly or Led Zeppelin, band names that contain contradictions, we chose Minor Alps—humble mountains," said Caws.

== Recording ==
Hatfield and Caws co-wrote the record and sung on all of the songs together. They also played all of the instruments with the exception of drums and programming, which were supplied by Parker Kindred (Joan As Police Woman, Antony and the Johnsons, second Jeff Buckley record, The Friends (with Sammy James Junior of Mooney Suzuki)) and Chris Egan (Say Hi To Your Mom, Computer Magic, Solange). Egan used a Roland TR-909 drum machine from the late 1980s to provide percussion. The record was co-produced by Tom Beaujour, in Hoboken, New Jersey.

== Cover album artwork ==
Photographer Tyler Coray took the photograph on the cover of the record. Design and layout by Derek Vander Griend.

== Video ==
Julie Gayet appears in the music video for "Waiting For You."

== Release ==
The record was released by Barsuk in the United States, Ye Olde Records in the United Kingdom/European Union, Stop Start Records in Australia, Only in Dreams in Japan, and Inker in Brazil.

== Reception ==
Professional ratings
Aggregate scores
Source	Rating
Metacritic	81/100
Review scores
Source	Rating
Allmusic	4/5 stars

The album was generally met with positive evaluations from critics. In Metacritic site it holds a score of 81 which means "Universal acclaim". Allmusic granted the album 4 stars out of 5, noting it was "a collaboration in the best sense of the word, with the two musicians bringing out the best in one another, their individual strengths coming together in a set of smart, well-crafted performances."

Rolling Stone characterized the music as "mostly reflective and intimate" with the two "harmonizing over fragile electronics and unobtrusive acoustic guitars." NPR music writer and editor Stephen Thompson said that Hatfield and Caws "together they have a very light, agreeable touch that to me is incredibly appealing."

BrooklynVegan described the record as "appealingly mellow pop, with arpeggiated guitars, gentle electronics, and the occasional melotron. Mostly, though, it's about Caws and Hatfield's voices which sound pretty great together."

American Songwriter, while calling the project an "oddly named sympathetic collaboration," said that "each tune blending into the next with little for the listener to hang on to beyond the overall gauzy mood" was "somewhat bland and forgettable."

== Track listing ==
No.	Title	Length
1.	"Buried Plans"	2:16
2.	"I Don't Know What to Do with My Hands"	3:54
3.	"Far from the Roses"	4:06
4.	"If I Wanted Trouble"	3:51
5.	"Maxon"	2:53
6.	"Wish You Were Upstairs"	3:12
7.	"Mixed Feelings"	2:23
8.	"Radio Static"	3:31
9.	"Lonely Low"	3:43
10.	"Waiting for You"	5:10
11.	"Away Again"	5:04
Total length:		40:03
