= Whatever, My Love =

Studio album by the Juliana Hatfield Three
- Released: February 17, 2015
- Recorded: 2014
- Studios: Nuthouse, Hoboken, New Jersey
- Genre: Alternative rock
- Length: 39:32
- Label: American Laundromat
- Producers: Juliana Hatfield; Tom Beaujour

The Juliana Hatfield Three chronology
Become What You Are (1993)	Whatever, My Love (2015)

Singles from Whatever, My Love
- 1. "If I Could" Released: December 11, 2014; 2. "Ordinary Guy" Released: January 14, 2015

Juliana Hatfield chronology
Wild Animals (2013)	Whatever, My Love (2014)	Wild Stab (2017)

Whatever, My Love is a studio album by the Juliana Hatfield Three, consisting of Hatfield, drummer Todd Philips and bassist Dean Fisher. The album marks the band's first release in twenty two years, since their LP Become What You Are in 1993.

== Production ==
In 2014, the Juliana Hatfield Three was reformed after two decades of hiatus, and vocalist Juliana Hatfield, drummer Todd Philips, and bassist Dean Fisher began practicing new material for an album. The album marked the band's first release in twenty two years, since their LP Become What You Are in 1993. Stated Hatfield about the new album, "We haven’t totally reinvented the wheel or anything," and that the tracks exhibit the "stuff I am sort of known for, I guess. But I am a lot more confident now than I was then with the first album. And I had more fun recording this one." The twelve tracks for Whatever, My Love were recorded at Nuthouse Recording in Hoboken, New Jersey, with Tom Beaujour and Hatfield co-producing the project. The album is "based on new single 'If I Could', a reworking of a catchy old demo from years past," according to Consequence of Sound.

== Release ==
"If I Could"
Excerpt of "If I Could", the album's lead single.

The lead single from the album, "If I Could", was released in December 2014, and was premiered in publications such as Rolling Stone. That month the album was made available for pre-order on American Laundromat Records, with an announced release date for Whatever, My Love on February 17, 2015. The album's single "Ordinary Guy" premiered on Consequence of Sound on January 14, 2015.

The band announced they would tour the United States in support of the album throughout February, as well as venues such as the Bowery Ballroom in New York City and The Roxy Theatre in Los Angeles in late March.

== Reception ==
Professional ratings
Review scores
Source	Rating
AllMusic	4.5/5 stars

In late December 2014, Stereogum named the album "one of their most anticipated albums of 2015," and on January 4, 2015, Consequence of Sound named it "one of the 50 most anticipated albums of 2015."

On January 9, 2015, Juliana Hatfield was featured on Nylon.com, who wrote that the upcoming album came off as "unforced, and with its sly lyrics and mega-hooky coffeehouse-grunge aesthetic." When the album's single "Ordinary Guy" premiered on Consequence of Sound on January 14, 2015, the review stated "through distorted guitars and ferocious screams, Hatfield recalls all of the troubles that come with dating an addict. Though there’s no semblance of a happy ending to be found, Hatfield's honesty and poignancy are deeply romantic in their own right."

== Track listing ==
All tracks are written by Juliana Hatfield, except "I Don't Know What to Do with My Hands" (Hatfield, Matthew Caws).

No.	Title	Length
1.	"Invisible"	4:31
2.	"Now That I Have Found You"	3:24
3.	"Ordinary Guy"	3:10
4.	"If Only We Were Dogs"	3:30
5.	"I'm Shy"	4:31
6.	"Dog on a Chain"	2:10
7.	"If I Could"	4:23
8.	"Push Pin"	1:51
9.	"Blame the Stylist"	2:52
10.	"I Don't Know What to Do with My Hands"	3:40
11.	"Wood"	2:42
12.	"Parking Lots"	2:50
Total length:		39:22

LP-only bonus track
No.	Title	Length
13.	"Only in the Dark"	3:08
Total length:		42:30

== Personnel ==
Credits are adapted from the album's liner notes.

The Juliana Hatfield Three

- Juliana Hatfield – guitar, vocals, keyboards, percussion, production, writing
- Todd Philips – drums
- Dean Fisher – bass

Production

- Tom Beaujour – production, engineering, back cover photography
- Sean Cahalin – additional guitar and keyboard recording engineering
- Sean Glonek – mastering

Artwork

- Lonny Unitus – art direction, design
- Jasper Coolidge – album cover photography

== Release dates ==
Date	Release details
February 17, 2015	American Laundromat Records

== See also ==
- Juliana Hatfield
- American Laundromat Records
