= Feel It (Some Girls album) =

Studio album by Some Girls
- Released: September 9, 2003
- Genre: Alternative rock
- Length: 37:36
- Label: Koch
- Producer: Jake Smith

Some Girls chronology
Feel It (2003)	Crushing Love (2006)

Professional ratings
Review scores
Source	Rating
AllMusic	4./5 stars

Feel It is the debut studio album by Some Girls, released in 2003 (see 2003 in music).

== Track listing ==
No.	Title	Writer(s)	Length
1.	"Feel It"	Juliana Hatfield	4:13
2.	"The Prettiest Girl"	Hatfield	3:14
3.	"Necessito"	Hatfield	2:55
4.	"Almost True"	Freda Love, Hatfield	4:04
5.	"Robot City"	Hatfield	3:32
6.	"Launch Pad"	Love	2:41
7.	"You Don't Know"	Hatfield, Love	3:09
8.	"Just Like The First Time"	Hatfield, Love	2:53
9.	"On My Back"	Hatfield, Love	3:44
10.	"The Getaway"	Love	3:13
11.	"Malted Milk"	Robert Johnson	4:04
Total length:			37:36

Japanese bonus track
No.	Title	Writer(s)	Length
12.	"Sex Beat" (The Gun Club cover)	Jeffrey Lee Pierce	2:33

== Personnel ==
- Juliana Hatfield - vocals, guitars and keyboards
- Heidi Gluck - bass, vocals, harmonica, slide, lap steel and keyboards
- Freda Love - drums, percussion and vocals
- Jake Smith - percussion, keyboards and backing vocals

== Production ==
- Producer: Jake Smith
- Engineer: Mike Stucker, Mark Maher, Paul Mahern, Vess Ruhtenberg and LonPaul Ellrich
- Mixing: Jake Smith and Some Girls
- Mastering: Jonathan Wyner
- Design: Juliana Hatfield
- Photography: Dylan Long and Tom Dube
