= David Miller (American musician) =

American singer-songwriter

- Also known as: Davey Miller; The Blind Soldier; Owen Mills
- Born: March 17, 1883; Ohio River, Lawrence County, Ohio, U.S.
- Died: November 1, 1959 (aged 76)
- Genres: Old-time music; Country music
- Occupation: Musician
- Instruments: Guitar; Vocals
- Years active: 1920s–1950s
- Labels: Gennett; Paramount; Romeo

David Miller (March 17, 1883, Ohio River, Ohio – November 1, 1953), sometimes Davey Miller, was an American old-time country musician. He is one of the earliest musicians to be associated with country music recording.

== Early life ==
Miller, born in Lawrence County, Ohio, grew up working at a fruit farm, and served in the Army in World War I. While there, he contracted blepharitis, and became totally blind as a result. He was honorably discharged. After discharge he was denied a pension. At some point he had learned guitar and so began a career as an itinerant musician on the medicine show and vaudeville circuit. He married in 1919 and moved to Huntington, West Virginia. Later, after moving, Miller teamed up with banjo player Cecil "Cob" Adkins. They became performers on radio station WSAZ from 1927 to 1933. Miller was often billed as "Davey Miller, The Blind Soldier".

== Career ==
Miller recorded two sides in 1924 and nine more 1927 for Gennett Records. He recorded a few pieces for the Starr Piano Company in 1924 and again in 1927, which are some of the earliest surviving audio documents of old-time music. In 1928, he recorded two ballads for Paramount Records under the name of Owen Mills on which he was backed by Frank Welling on steel guitar and David McGee on guitar and harmonica. Welling and McGee also produced and played on a number of country singles for various artists while under contract for Paramount.

He also recorded for Paramount Records in 1930. He played on West Virginia radio station WSAZ with Cecil Adkins from 1927 to 1933. He also played with a string band called the West Virginia Mockingbirds in the 1930s and 1940s, alongside four brothers, Ed, George, Albert, and Frank Baumgardner. They played on radio and at local churches and dance parties, and became regionally popular. Although the Great Depression ended most recordings of rural musicians and drove out of business many record labels, including Paramount, Miller would travel to New York City in 1931 for another session for the small Romeo Records. This resulted in another single; a solo guitar instrumental called "Jailhouse Rag". Even though Miller was a member of the West Virginia Mockingbirds, he ceased to release any more recordings after 1931 and the band broke up when World War II began.

Miller continued to perform into the early 1950s, playing regularly at the Guyandotte theater alongside musicians such as T. Texas Tyler, Hawkshaw Hawkins and Patsy Cline; by that time his style was an anachronistic throwback to an earlier era.

== Musical style ==
Typical of the day, Miller's material was a mixture of sentimental ballads and ragtime-influenced guitar solos. He sang in a strong tenor influenced by that of Vernon Dalhart and unlike the more overtly rural styles of most other country artists of the era suggesting he may have had some vocal training at some point.

== Death and influence ==
He died in 1959. Miller was notable for the length of his career, which lasted from the vaudeville age into the modern era without changing his sound, which was already somewhat old-fashioned when he first entered the studio.

== Bibliography ==
- "Country Music Records A Discography"; 1921–1942, Tony Russell, Oxford University Press, 2004
- "Paramount Old Time Recordings", liner notes by Pat Harrison, JSP, 2006
- "Old Time Mountain Guitar", liner noted by Robert Fleder, County, 1998
