= Juliana's Pony: Total System Failure =

Studio album by Juliana Hatfield
- Released: May 16, 2000
- Genre: Alternative rock
- Length: 38:22
- Label: Zoë
- Producer: Juliana Hatfield

Juliana Hatfield chronology
Beautiful Creature (2000)	Juliana's Pony: Total System Failure (2000)	Gold Stars 1992–2002: The Juliana Hatfield Collection (2002)

Juliana's Pony: Total System Failure is an album by Juliana Hatfield's trio, Juliana's Pony, released on May 16, 2000. It was released the same day as Hatfield's solo album, Beautiful Creature.

== Production ==
The album was recorded as the trio of Hatfield, Zephan Courtney and Mikey Welsh, dubbed Juliana's Pony. Although inspired by Hatfield's months-long stay in Los Angeles, the album was made in Austin, Texas. The songs "Total System Failure" and "Leather Pants" use the same music with different lyrics. Welsh co-wrote four songs.

== Release ==
Juliana's Pony: Total System Failure was released on the same day as Hatfield's solo album, Beautiful Creature. A collectors' edition of both albums was also simultaneously released. It contained a third enhanced CD that included a Juliana Hatfield screensaver, a photo gallery consisting of six pictures, a web link to Hatfield's webpage at Zoë Records, a cover of the Police's "Every Breath You Take", "When You Loved Me" (Mex Mix) and an open letter from Hatfield to her fans. The letter read as follows:

I was living in Los Angeles. I seemed to have fallen for an image (deep down, I'm really shallow). It was so beautiful. His eyes were black. But as I walked down my street, all the neighborhood dogs seemed trained to attack. And the sun was like a deathray.

This is a dangerous business. People aren't always what they seem, even when they think they are telling the truth. All motivations are hidden.

I had planned on staying a year, but after six months, I became restless enough to leave. Always wanting to be somewhere I'm not, content only when en route. Music sounds better in a moving car.

Where am I now? I'm still here. In between. Thank you for asking. Without you, I may have ceased to exist.

Juliana Hatfield

== Critical reception ==
Professional ratings
Aggregate scores
Source	Rating
Metacritic	35/100
Review scores
Source	Rating
AllMusic	2/5 stars
Robert Christgau	(2-star Honorable Mention)
The Encyclopedia of Popular Music	2/5 stars
Entertainment Weekly	A

Exclaim! wrote that "this is Hatfield at her funniest and most bitter, heaping bile on boy toys ('Houseboy'), All About Eve ladder-climbers ('My Protegee'), teenage girls in SUVs ('Road Wrath') and overly fertile families ('Breeders')." Trouser Press wrote: "It’s easily the weakest album in her career and sounds even worse when compared to the subtle path of Beautiful Creature, although there is something mortifyingly fascinating about the utterly disastrous tone in which Hatfield portrays her life and loves."

Scripp's Howard News Service's Mark Brown ranked both Juliana's Pony: Total System Failure and Beautiful Creature as #5 on his list of the top 10 albums of 2000. While it generally received less favorable reviews than Beautiful Creature, The Pitch's Scott Wilson, who didn't particularly like either, called it "ham-fisted and uncompelling, however, Beautiful Creature might be worse."

== Track listing ==
All tracks are written by Juliana Hatfield, except where noted.

No.	Title	Writer(s)	Length
1.	"White Thrash"		0:15
2.	"Metal Fume Fever"	Hatfield, Mikey Welsh	2:00
3.	"Houseboy"	Hatfield, Welsh	2:44
4.	"Road Wrath"	Hatfield, Welsh	3:36
5.	"Let's Get Married"		2:30
6.	"Breeders"	Hatfield, Welsh	2:54
7.	"My Protégée"		3:43
8.	"Total System Failure"		3:12
9.	"The Victim"		2:50
10.	"Using You"		4:11
11.	"Leather Pants"		2:52
12.	"Noblesse Oblige"		4:00
13.	"Ten Foot Pole"		3:35
Total length:			38:22

Live versions of "My Protégée" and "Ten Foot Pole" also appear on Hatfield's live album The White Broken Line: Live Recordings.

== Personnel ==
- Juliana Hatfield – guitar, vocals
- Zephan Courtney – drums
- Mikey Welsh – bass, backing vocals

Production

- Producer: Juliana Hatfield
- Engineer: Brian Brown
- Mastering: Brian Lee
- Photography: Juliana Hatfield, Mikey Welsh
