= Juliana Hatfield (album) =

Studio album by Juliana Hatfield
- Released: August 28, 2012
- Recorded: 2012
- Genre: Alternative rock
- Length: 43:20
- Label: Ye Olde Records
- Producer: Juliana Hatfield, Tom Dubé, Andy Chase, Brad Walsh and Rafi Sofer

Juliana Hatfield chronology
There's Always Another Girl (2011)	Juliana Hatfield (2012)	Wild Animals (2013)

Juliana Hatfield is an album of covers by alternative rock artist Juliana Hatfield. The album was released on August 28, 2012, with funding raised by fans through Hatfield's second PledgeMusic drive. 10% of the funding past the goal amount went to IMPACT Boston which offers personal safety and self-defense courses. The album includes tracks written by a variety of artists, including Creedence Clearwater Revival, Liz Phair, Ryan Adams, Led Zeppelin and The Who.

== Track listing ==
#	Title	Writer	Original artist	Time
1.	"Cells"	Norman Blake	Teenage Fanclub	2:55
2.	"Learn to Fly"	Dave Grohl, Taylor Hawkins, Nate Mendel	Foo Fighters	4:15
3.	"Bad Moon Rising"	John Fogerty	Creedence Clearwater Revival	3:26
4.	"Ready for Love"	Mick Ralphs	Bad Company	4:17
5.	"Selfmachine"	Eliot Sumner, Klas Åhlund	I Blame Coco	3:43
6.	"Fruit Fly"	Matthew Caws, Ira Elliot, Daniel Lorca	Nada Surf	4:32
7.	"Closet"	Pete Yorn	Pete Yorn	2:59
8.	"Sweet Is the Night"	Jeff Lynne	Electric Light Orchestra	3:33
9.	"Do I Wait"	Ryan Adams	Ryan Adams	3:31
10.	"Friend of Mine"	Liz Phair	Liz Phair	3:37
11.	"My Wife"	John Entwistle	The Who	3:02
12.	"Rock and Roll"	Jimmy Page, Robert Plant, John Paul Jones, John Bonham	Led Zeppelin	3:34

== Personnel ==
- Juliana Hatfield – vocals, guitars, bass, keyboards, percussion
- Matthew Caws – background vocals on tracks 1, 5 and 8
- Peter Adams – keyboards
- Ed Valauskas – bass
- Pete Caldes – drums
- Andy Chase – additional instrumentation and drum tracks on tracks 2 and 8
- Brad Walsh – additional instrumentation and drum tracks on track 5

=== Production ===
- Producer: Juliana Hatfield, Tom Dubé, Andy Chase, and Brad Walsh
- Engineer: Rafi Sofer and Tom Dubé
- Mastering: Ian Kennedy at New Alliance East
- Design: Jay Walsh at Hungry Head Design
- Artwork: Juliana Hatfield
