= Wild Animals (Juliana Hatfield album) =

Studio album by Juliana Hatfield
- Released: September 10, 2013
- Recorded: 2013
- Genre: Indie rock
- Length: 30:21
- Label: Ye Olde Records

Juliana Hatfield chronology
Juliana Hatfield (2012)	Wild Animals (2013)	Pussycat (2017)

Wild Animals is the 13th solo studio album by Juliana Hatfield. The album is mostly acoustic and was released on September 10, 2013 It was created with the monetary contribution of Hatfield's fans through PledgeMusic with a portion of the funds raised going to the Northeast Animal Shelter in Massachusetts and to Save a Sato in Puerto Rico.

== Track listing ==
All songs written by Juliana Hatfield

No.	Title	Length
1.	"Sleep"	2:57
2.	"June 6th"	2:54
3.	"Spit in the Wind"	2:37
4.	"Parking Lots"	2:35
5.	"Dog on a Chain"	2:19
6.	"Hurt Me"	2:49
7.	"Tracks"	3:10
8.	"Push Pin"	2:03
9.	"Or So They Say"	2:30
10.	"Love Is Like the Wind"	3:04
11.	"Never Beg"	3:30
Total length:		30:21

== Personnel ==
- Juliana Hatfield – all instruments

=== Production ===
- Producer: Juliana Hatfield
- Mastering: Ian Kennedy at New Alliance East
- Design: Jay Walsh
