= How to Walk Away =

Studio album by Juliana Hatfield
- Released: August 19, 2008
- Genre: Indie rock
- Length: 42:57
- Label: Ye Olde
- Producer: Andy Chase

Juliana Hatfield chronology
Sittin' in a Tree (2007)	How to Walk Away (2008)	Peace & Love (2010)

Professional ratings
Aggregate scores
Source	Rating
Metacritic	72/100
Review scores
Source	Rating
AllMusic	4.5/5 stars
Details	4/5 stars
Entertainment Weekly	A−
Slant Magazine	3.5/5 stars
Spin	3/5 stars

How to Walk Away is the eighth solo album by singer/songwriter Juliana Hatfield. It was released in North America on August 19, 2008. On September 29, 2008, it was followed by her memoir, When I Grow Up. The iTunes version of the album features a bonus track, "Not Enough" – 4:02 (offered in DRM-free iTunes Plus format).

== Track listing ==
All tracks are written by Juliana Hatfield except where noted.

No.	Title	Writer(s)	Length
1.	"The Fact Remains"		3:52
2.	"Shining On"		4:53
3.	"This Lonely Love" (featuring Richard Butler)	Hatfield, Andy Chase	5:12
4.	"My Baby..."		4:26
5.	"Just Lust"		3:34
6.	"Now I'm Gone"		4:05
7.	"Remember November"	Juliana Hatfield, Jason Hatfield	4:15
8.	"So Alone"		4:00
9.	"Such a Beautiful Girl" (featuring Matthew Caws)	Juliana Hatfield, Jason Hatfield	3:51
10.	"Law of Nature"		4:49
Total length:			42:57

iTunes bonus track
No.	Title	Length
11.	"Not Enough"	4:02

== Personnel ==
- Juliana Hatfield – vocals, guitar, keyboards
- Andy Chase – guitar, keyboards, string arrangements, backing vocals
- Jody Porter – guitar
- Peter Adams – piano
- Jason Hatfield – piano
- Tracy Bonham – violin
- Jeff Alan Hill – bass guitar, cello
- Ethan Eubanks – drums
- Rudyard Lee Cullers – backing vocals
- Richard Butler – vocals on "This Lonely Love"
- Matthew Caws – vocals on "Such a Beautiful Girl"

Production

- Producer: Andy Chase
- Engineer: Rudyard Lee Cullers
- Mixing: Andy Chase and David Kahne
- Mastering: Scott Hull
- Design and layout: Jordyn Bonds
