= There's Always Another Girl =

Studio album by Juliana Hatfield
- Released: August 30, 2011
- Recorded: 2011
- Genre: Indie rock
- Length: 50:30
- Label: Ye Olde

Juliana Hatfield chronology
Peace & Love (2010)	There's Always Another Girl (2011)	Juliana Hatfield (2012)

Professional ratings
Aggregate scores
Source	Rating
Metacritic	75/100
Review scores
Source	Rating
AllMusic	4/5 stars
Blurt	6/10 stars
The Boston Globe	8/10 stars
Now	6/10 stars
Paste	7.2/10
PopMatters	8/10 stars
Tiny Mix Tapes	2/5 stars

There's Always Another Girl is the 11th solo studio album by Juliana Hatfield, released August 30, 2011. It was created with the monetary contribution of Hatfield's fans through Pledgemusic and those who supported the project received the album a month early on July 27, 2011. The title track was originally subtitled and/or dedicated "(For Lindsay Lohan)" when streamed through Stereogum on May 12, 2009.

== Track listing ==
all songs written by Juliana Hatfield

No.	Title	Length
1.	"Change the World"	3:48
2.	"Taxicab"	3:37
3.	"Don't Wanna Dance"	3:18
4.	"There's Always Another Girl"	3:37
5.	"Candy Wrappers"	3:32
6.	"Someone Else's Problem"	4:04
7.	"Sex and Drugs"	3:19
8.	"Stray Kids"	2:55
9.	"Failure"	3:36
10.	"Vagabond"	3:50
11.	"And Again"	4:26
12.	"Batteries"	3:33
13.	"Wasting Time"	3:18
14.	"Thousands of Guitars"	3:46
Total length:		50:30

== Personnel ==
- Juliana Hatfield – vocals, guitars, bass, keyboards, percussion
- Ed Valauskas – bass
- Pete Caldes – drums
- Rafi Sofer – special backwards effects and noises

Production

- Engineer: Rafi Sofer
- Mastering: Jonathan Wyner at M Works
- Design: Jay Walsh
- Nude photo: Jay Walsh
- Plant photo: Juliana Hatfield
- Concepts: Juliana Hatfield
