= Only Everything =

Studio album by Juliana Hatfield
- Released: March 28, 1995
- Studios: Fort Apache (Cambridge); Sear Sound (New York City); The Magic Shop (New York City)
- Genre: Alternative rock
- Length: 51:20
- Label: Mammoth/Atlantic
- Producers: Juliana Hatfield; Paul Q. Kolderie; Sean Slade

Juliana Hatfield chronology
Become What You Are (1993)	Only Everything (1995)	Bed (1998)

Singles from Only Everything
- 1. "Universal Heart-Beat" Released: 1995; 2. "What a Life" Released: 1995; 3. "Live On Tomorrow" Released: 1995

Only Everything is the second solo album by Juliana Hatfield, released in 1995. Two singles with accompanying music videos were released from the album: "What a Life" and "Universal Heart-Beat." "Universal Heart-Beat" peaked at No. 5 on Billboard's Modern Rock Tracks in 1995.

== Overview ==
Upon its release in 1995, Only Everything was notable for its sound, which was more aggressive than Hatfield's previous work. Produced by Paul Q. Kolderie and Sean Slade, who had previously produced Hole's very successful Live Through This, the album features heavily distorted guitar tones with catchy pop songs.

== Critical reception ==
Professional ratings
Review scores
Source	Rating
AllMusic	3/5 stars
The Encyclopedia of Popular Music	3/5 stars
MusicHound Rock: The Essential Album Guide	4/5 stars
Spin	7/10

AllMusic wrote that "even with the improved musicianship, Hatfield isn't able to deliver consistently impressive songs, occasionally relying on her cuteness to cover underdeveloped lyrics and pedestrian melodies." Trouser Press wrote that "Hatfield cranked it up on Only Everything without losing her instinctive pop charms or her treatises on what she describes as 'white, middle-class angst.'”

== Track listing ==
All tracks are written by Juliana Hatfield.

No.	Title	Length
1.	"What a Life"	3:22
2.	"Fleur de Lys"	3:45
3.	"Universal Heart-Beat"	3:25
4.	"Dumb Fun"	3:26
5.	"Live on Tomorrow"	2:59
6.	"Dying Proof"	2:50
7.	"Bottles and Flowers"	5:25
8.	"Outsider"	3:16
9.	"OK OK"	2:38
10.	"Congratulations"	4:42
11.	"Hang Down from Heaven"	3:22
12.	"My Darling"	2:52
13.	"Simplicity Is Beautiful"	4:14
14.	"You Blues"	5:04
Total length:		51:20

== Personnel ==
Credits adapted from CD liner notes.

- Juliana Hatfield – all vocals, all guitars, piano (1, 5, 7, 14), Wurlitzer piano (3), bass guitar (5, 7, 11, 12, 14), hand beats (8), Mellotron (12)
- Jim Fitting – baritone saxophone (4)
- Dean Fisher – bass guitar (1–4, 6–10, 13)
- Josh Freese – drums (1, 3–6, 9, 10, 14)
- Mike Levesque – drums (2, 7, 11–13)
- Paul Q. Kolderie – drum machine (8)
- Sean Slade – drum machine (8), clavinet (8)
- Walter Sear – theremin (4)

Production

- Producers: Juliana Hatfield, Paul Q. Kolderie, Sean Slade
- Engineers: Paul Q. Kolderie, Sean Slade
- Assistant engineers: Edward Douglas, Bill Emmons, Fred Kevorkian, Carl Plaster
- Mixing: Paul Q. Kolderie, Sean Slade
- Art direction: Thomas Bricker
- Photography: Michael Lavine
- Cover art: "Buffalo Medicine" by John Nieto (1994)

== Charts ==
Chart (1995)	Peak position
Canada Top Albums/CDs (RPM)	59
UK Albums Chart	59
US Billboard 200	96
