= In Exile Deo =

Studio album by Juliana Hatfield
- Released: May 18, 2004
- Recorded: late 2003 – early 2004
- Genre: Alternative rock
- Length: 51:13
- Label: Zoë
- Producer: Juliana Hatfield, David Leonard

Juliana Hatfield chronology
Gold Stars 1992–2002: The Juliana Hatfield Collection (2002)	In Exile Deo (2004)	Made in China (2005)

Professional ratings
Aggregate scores
Source	Rating
Metacritic	74/100
Review scores
Source	Rating
AllMusic	4.5/5 stars
Entertainment Weekly	B+
Paste	Favorable
Pitchfork Media	7.6/10
Q	4/10 stars
Rolling Stone	3/5 stars
Trouser Press	9/10 stars

In Exile Deo is the sixth album by Juliana Hatfield, released in 2004.

== Track listing ==
All tracks are written by Juliana Hatfield except where noted.

No.	Title	Writer(s)	Length
1.	"Get in Line"		3:38
2.	"Jamie's in Town"		3:58
3.	"Tourist"		2:39
4.	"Some Rainy Sunday"		3:11
5.	"Tomorrow Never Comes"	Dot Allison	4:36
6.	"Forever"		3:58
7.	"Dirty Dog"		4:24
8.	"Because We Love You"		4:28
9.	"Singing in the Shower"		4:35
10.	"It Should've Been You"		4:32
11.	"Sunshine"		2:48
12.	"Don't Let Me Down"		3:59
13.	"My Enemy"		4:27
Total length:			51:13

== Personnel ==
- Juliana Hatfield – vocals, guitar
- Peter Adams – keyboards
- Jill Kurtz – harmonica
- Josh Lattanzi – bass guitar, background vocals
- Rob Turner – cello
- Larry Packer – violin
- Damon Richardson – drums
- Steve Scully – drums

Production

- Producers: Juliana Hatfield, David Leonard
- Engineers: Brian Brown, Dave Cook, Tom Dube
- Mixing: David Leonard, Dave Way
- Mastering: Greg Calbi
- String arrangements: Gary Burke
