= Become What You Are =

Studio album by the Juliana Hatfield Three
- Released: August 3, 1993
- Studios: Hollywood Sound, Los Angeles, California
- Genres: Alternative rock; power pop
- Length: 40:22
- Label: Mammoth
- Producer: Scott Litt

The Juliana Hatfield Three chronology
Become What You Are (1993)	Whatever, My Love (2015)

Juliana Hatfield chronology
Hey Babe (1992)	Become What You Are (1993)	Only Everything (1995)

Singles from Become What You Are
- 1. "My Sister" Released: August 30, 1993; 2. "For the Birds" Released: 1993; 3. "Spin the Bottle" Released: 1994

Become What You Are is the debut studio album by the American alternative rock band the Juliana Hatfield Three, released on August 3, 1993, by Mammoth Records. The album includes the hit singles "My Sister" and "Spin the Bottle".

== Recording and release ==
The band's singer and guitarist, Juliana Hatfield, recorded Become What You Are with drummer Todd Philips, formerly of Moving Targets and Bullet LaVolta, and bassist Dean Fisher, who she met during high school in Duxbury, Massachusetts. Unlike her previous album Hey Babe, which deals with personal topics, Hatfield decided to write songs about other things and make them more universal. The title of the album was inspired by German philosopher Friedrich Nietzsche, whom Hatfield admired.

The album was recorded at Hollywood Sound, mixed at Oceanway Studios and mastered at Precision Mastering in Los Angeles. It was released on August 3, 1993, by Mammoth Records. The song "Spin the Bottle" is featured on the soundtrack of the 1994 film Reality Bites. As of February 2010, Become What You Are had sold 267,000 copies in the US according to Nielsen SoundScan.

== Critical reception ==
Professional ratings
Review scores
Source	Rating
AllMusic	3.5/5 stars
Chicago Tribune	2.5/4 stars
Entertainment Weekly	A−
Los Angeles Times	2.5/4 stars
NME	7/10
The Philadelphia Inquirer	3.5/4 stars
Q	4/5 stars
Rolling Stone	4/5 stars
Select	4/5
USA Today	3.5/4 stars

Become What You Are received generally favorable reviews. Stephen Thomas Erlewine of AllMusic praised Hatfield's honest vocals on "Supermodel," "My Sister," and "Spin the Bottle", stating that "her talents are strong enough to carry the album over the weak spots." The album was ranked No. 9 in NME's Albums of the Year list for 1993.

== Track listing ==
All tracks are written by Juliana Hatfield, except "I Got No Idols" (Hatfield, Todd Philips).

No.	Title	Length
1.	"Supermodel"	2:52
2.	"My Sister"	3:22
3.	"This Is the Sound"	3:01
4.	"For the Birds"	4:14
5.	"Mabel"	4:09
6.	"A Dame with a Rod"	2:55
7.	"Addicted"	3:16
8.	"Feelin' Massachusetts"	4:11
9.	"Spin the Bottle"	2:23
10.	"President Garfield"	4:38
11.	"Little Pieces"	3:05
12.	"I Got No Idols"	2:16
Total length:		40:22

== Personnel ==
Credits are adapted from the album's liner notes.

The Juliana Hatfield Three

- Juliana Hatfield – vocals, guitar
- Dean Fisher – bass
- Todd Philips – drums

Additional musicians

- Denny Fongheiser – percussion
- Peter Holsapple – keyboards
- Mike Leahy – intro guitar riff on "Addicted"

Production

- Scott Litt – producer, engineer
- Ed Brooks – engineer, assistant engineer
- Martin Schmelzle – assistant engineer
- Steve Holroyd – mixed assistant
- Stephen Marcussen – mastering

Artwork

- Jean Cronin – design
- Melanie Nissen – photography

== Charts ==
Chart performance for Become What You Are
Chart (1993)	Peak
Australian Albums (ARIA Charts)	89
US Top Heatseekers	1
Billboard 200	119
