= Bed (album) =

Studio album by Juliana Hatfield
- Released: August 25, 1998
- Recorded: March 9 – 15, 1998
- Studio: Sound Station Seven in Providence, Rhode Island
- Genre: Alternative rock
- Length: 40:43
- Label: Zoë
- Producer: Juliana Hatfield

Juliana Hatfield chronology
Only Everything (1995)	Bed (1998)	Beautiful Creature (2000)

Bed is the third solo album by American singer-songwriter Juliana Hatfield, released in 1998 by Zoë Records.

== Recording ==
Bed was written in a few weeks, and recorded and mixed from March 9 to March 15, 1998, at Sound Station Seven in Providence, Rhode Island. Hatfield chose to record the album with a stripped-down sound and did not favor any digital processing effects. According to her, "I had just been listening to things that were very raw and dry, the kind of things where you can really hear all the instruments very close to your ear when you have headphones on. I guess I was feeling raw, and I didn't want to pretty it up or put anything on top of it."

== Reception ==
Professional ratings
Review scores
Source	Rating
AllMusic	3/5 stars
Entertainment Weekly	A−

Writing for CMJ New Music Monthly, reviewer Brett Milano praised the album, stating that its songs have more depth than Hatfield's earlier MTV hits. Although he admitted that some tracks sounded a bit rushed, he felt that the album has enough gems to keep it interesting.

== Track listing ==
All tracks are written by Juliana Hatfield.

CD
No.	Title	Length
1.	"Down on Me"	2:56
2.	"I Want to Want You"	4:08
3.	"Swan Song"	3:32
4.	"Sneaking Around"	4:15
5.	"Backseat"	6:05
6.	"Live It Up"	3:37
7.	"You Are the Camera"	4:02
8.	"Running Out"	3:08
9.	"Bad Day"	5:02
10.	"Let's Blow It All"	4:01
Total length:		40:46

UK Bonus Tracks
No.	Title	Length
11.	"Sellout"	3:59
12.	"Trying Not To Think About It"	3:07
Total length:		47:52

== Personnel ==
Musicians

- Juliana Hatfield – guitar, keyboards, vocals
- Todd Philips – percussion, drums
- Mikey Welsh – bass

Technical

- Producer: Juliana Hatfield
- Engineer: Jon Williams
- Package design: Tom Bonauro, Jim Goldberg
- Design assistant: Richard Turtletaub
- Photography: Jim Goldberg
