= Please Do Not Disturb (EP) =

EP by Juliana Hatfield
- Released: October 21, 1997
- Genre: Alternative Rock
- Length: 22:22
- Label: Bar/None Records
- Producer: Juliana Hatfield

Professional ratings
Review scores
Source	Rating
AMG	3/5 stars

Please Do Not Disturb is an EP recording by Juliana Hatfield, released in 1997 (see 1997 in music).

== Track listing ==
all songs by Juliana Hatfield

1. "Sellout" - 3:58
2. "Trying Not to Think About It" - 3:03
3. "As If Your Life Depended on It" - 4:50
4. "Give Me Some of That" - 3:04
5. "Get Off" - 4:07
6. "The Edge of Nowhere" - 3:25

== Personnel ==
- Juliana Hatfield - vocals, guitar, keyboard, bass (track 5)
- Mikey Welsh - bass
- Todd Phillips - drums, percussion, guitar (track 2)
- Mike Leahy - guitar (track 3)
- Ed Slanker - guitar (track 4)
- Tim O'Heir - synthesizer
- Duke Roth - cello

== Production ==
- Wally Gagel – Engineer
- Jim Goldberg – Photography
