= Pussycat (album) =

Studio album by Juliana Hatfield
- Released: April 28, 2017
- Recorded: 2017
- Studios: Q Division, Somerville, Massachusetts, United States
- Genre: Alternative rock
- Length: 43:47
- Label: American Laundromat
- Producer: Juliana Hatfield

Juliana Hatfield chronology
Wild Stab (2013)	Pussycat (2017)	Juliana Hatfield Sings Olivia Newton-John (2018)

Pussycat is a studio album from American alternative rock singer and songwriter Juliana Hatfield, released by American Laundromat Records on April 28, 2017. It has received positive reception from critics.

== Recording and release ==
Hatfield wrote and recorded the album solo over the course of 12 days, playing all instruments other than the drums. The work was inspired by her displeasure with the 2016 United States presidential election.

== Critical reception ==
From Metacritic, which assigns a normalized score out of 100 to ratings from publications, the album received an average score of 84 based on eight reviews, indicating "universal acclaim". Kenneth Partridge of The A.V. Club gave Pussycat a B+ and praises the singer for stretching her songwriting into protest songs. Jon Putnam of The Line of Best Fit gave the album a nine out of 10 for being Hatfield's best album, writing that it is "an unqualified success [as] Hatfield has constructed it with multiple dimensions and, no matter the mood or approach a given song takes, she continually scores with material among the finest of her career". Will Layman of PopMatters agrees that this is Hatfield's best release and frames his review by writing that "Pussycat is a celebration of some kind", as humans need to rely on one another for strength, including with uplifting music. The editorial staff of AllMusic Guide gave this release four out of five stars, with reviewer Stephen Thomas Erlewine calling it a combination of "kinetic energy" in the performances with "a wealth of smart, barbed songs" in the songwriting that has "no separation between the personal and the political". Writing for Paste, Craig Dorfman scored Pussycat a 7.2 out of 10, for fierce lyrics criticizing misogyny and summing up that it has a "cathartic honesty ideal for the anger of our times". In his 6.8 out of 10 review for Pitchfork Media, Evan Rytlewski also notes how angry Hatfield is against predatory men, noting that "as loaded as the subject matter is, it does amazingly little to diminish Hatfield’s bright spirit", with Hatfield still retains "the intrinsic tunefulness that’s marked every record she’s made since she was a teenager".

== Track listing ==
All songs written by Juliana Hatfield

1. "I Wanna Be Your Disease" – 3:30
2. "Impossible Song" – 4:35
3. "You're Breaking My Heart" – 3:27
4. "When You're a Star" – 2:16
5. "Good Enough for Me" – 3:14
6. "Short-Fingered Man" – 2:16
7. "Touch You Again" – 2:54
8. "Sex Machine" – 3:09
9. "Wonder Why" – 3:02
10. "Sunny Somewhere" – 3:13
11. "Kellyanne" – 3:45
12. "Heartless" – 2:21
13. "Rhinoceros" – 3:36
14. "Everything Is Forgiven" – 2:38

== Personnel ==
- Juliana Hatfield – vocals, guitar, bass guitar, keyboards, production, mixing
- Nicole Anguish – design
- Pete Caldes – drums
- Pat DiCenso – engineering
- Sean Glonek – mastering at SRG Studios
