= Peace & Love (Juliana Hatfield album) =

Studio album by Juliana Hatfield
- Released: February 16, 2010
- Genre: Indie rock
- Length: 39:41
- Label: Ye Olde
- Producer: Juliana Hatfield

Juliana Hatfield chronology
How to Walk Away (2008)	Peace & Love (2010)	There's Always Another Girl (2011)

Professional ratings
Aggregate scores
Source	Rating
Metacritic	60/100
Review scores
Source	Rating
AllMusic	4/5 stars
Los Angeles Times	3/4 stars
Paste	(favorable)
Pitchfork	3.9/10
PopMatters	2/10 stars
Slant Magazine	3/5 stars

Peace & Love is the tenth solo album by singer/songwriter Juliana Hatfield. The album is noteworthy in Hatfield's catalogue for her role in every aspect of its recording: Hatfield wrote and performed all of the songs on the album, in addition to playing all of the instruments. She also produced and engineered the album herself, and she released the album on Ye Olde Records, her own label

== Track listing ==
all songs written by Juliana Hatfield

No.	Title	Length
1.	"Peace and Love"	3:05
2.	"The End of the War"	2:41
3.	"Why Can't We Love Each Other"	3:33
4.	"Butterflies"	4:09
5.	"What is Wrong"	2:51
6.	"Unsung"	2:02
7.	"Evan"	4:30
8.	"Let's Go Home"	3:48
9.	"I Picked You Up"	3:14
10.	"Faith in Our Friends"	3:20
11.	"I'm Disappearing"	3:20
12.	"Dear Anonymous"	3:17
Total length:		39:42

== Personnel ==
- Juliana Hatfield – vocals and all instruments, production, engineering
