= Juliana Hatfield =

American guitarist/singer-songwriter and author

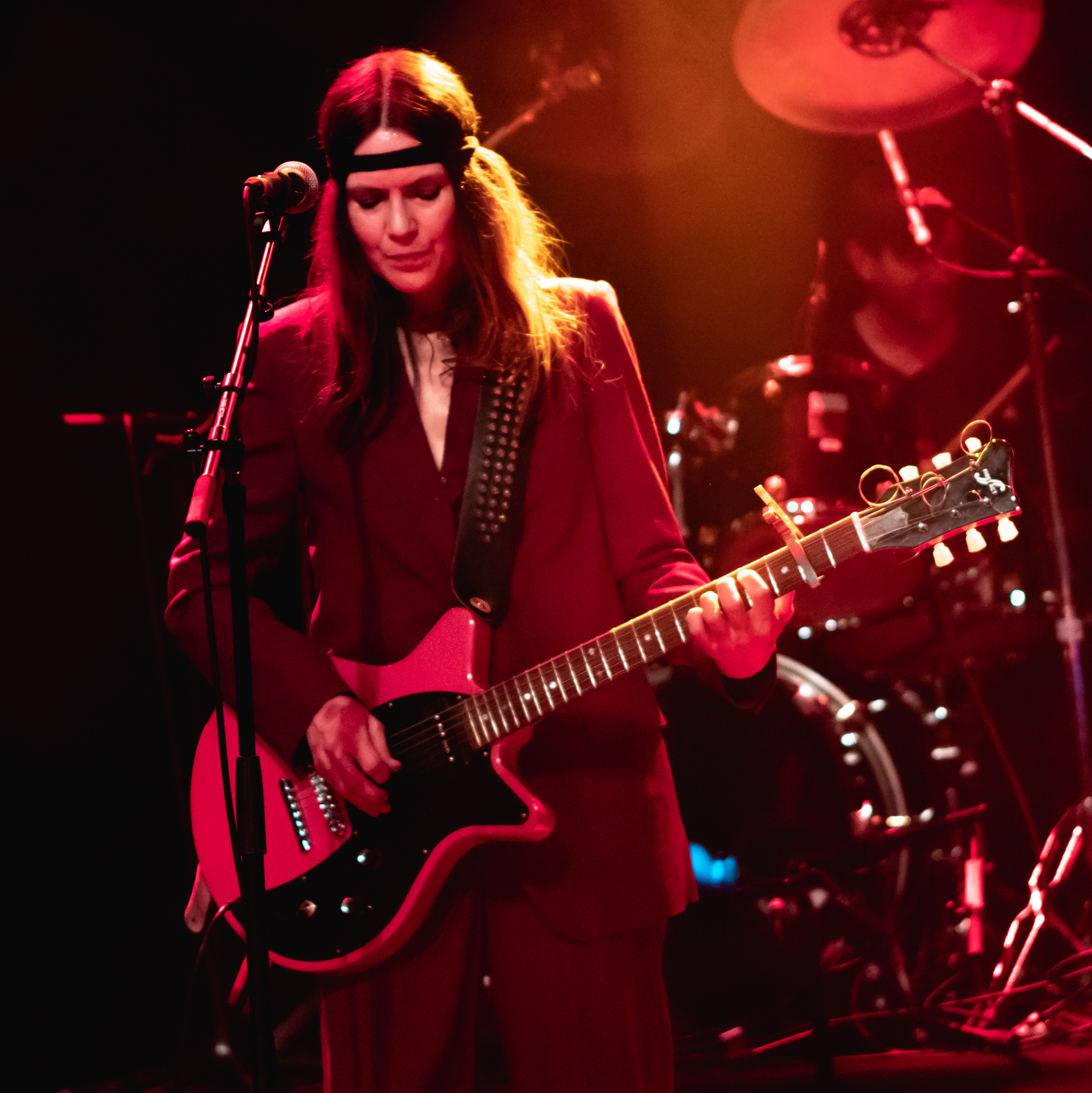
- Hatfield performing in 2019

Background information
- Born: July 27, 1967 (age 59); Wiscasset, Maine, U.S.
- Genre: Alternative rock
- Occupations: Musician; singer; songwriter; record producer
- Instruments: Vocals, guitar, bass guitar, drums, keyboards
- Years active: 1986–present
- Labels: Mammoth, Zoë, Ye Olde, American Laundromat
- Formerly of: Blake Babies, Some Girls, Evan Dando, The Lemonheads, Minor Alps, The I Don't Cares
- Website: julianahatfield.com

Juliana Hatfield (born July 27, 1967) is an American musician and singer-songwriter from the Boston area. She was formerly a member of the indie rock bands Blake Babies, Some Girls, and the Lemonheads. Hatfield also fronted her own band, The Juliana Hatfield Three, alongside bassist Dean Fisher and drummer Todd Philips, which was active in the mid-1990s and again in the mid-2010s. With The Juliana Hatfield Three, she achieved her best-charting work, including the critically acclaimed album Become What You Are (1993), which featured the singles "My Sister" (1993) and "Spin the Bottle".

She has performed and recorded as a solo artist and as one-half of Minor Alps with Matthew Caws of Nada Surf. In 2014, she reformed The Juliana Hatfield Three and announced the release of the album Whatever, My Love in 2015.

In 2016, she collaborated with Paul Westerberg under the moniker the I Don't Cares to release the album Wild Stab. She later released an album of original work titled Weird (2019), along with three albums of cover songs: Juliana Hatfield Sings Olivia Newton-John (2018), Juliana Hatfield Sings The Police (2019), and Juliana Hatfield Sings ELO (2023).

== Early life ==
Hatfield was born in Wiscasset, Maine, to Phillip M. Hatfield, a radiologist, and Julie Hatfield, a former fashion editor for The Boston Globe. She grew up in Duxbury, Massachusetts, near Boston. Despite recording a song titled "My Sister," Hatfield has no sisters but does have two brothers.

Her father claimed that their family descended from the West Virginia Hatfields of the Hatfield–McCoy feud following the Civil War. He also served in the U.S. Navy during the Vietnam War.

Hatfield attended Duxbury High School in Duxbury, Massachusetts. She first enrolled at Boston University before transferring to Berklee College of Music in Boston. In 2012, she attended the School of the Museum of Fine Arts, Boston, where she completed a year-long post-baccalaureate certificate program in painting.

== Music career ==
=== First bands and solo album ===
Hatfield developed a love for rock music during the 1970s after a babysitter introduced her to the Los Angeles punk rock band X, an experience she described as life-changing. She was also drawn to the music of more mainstream artists, including Olivia Newton-John and The Police.

While still attending Berklee College of Music in 1986, Hatfield formed the band Blake Babies with John Strohm and Freda Love. The band released four albums between 1987 and 1991, gaining critical recognition from Rolling Stone and The Village Voice, as well as local radio airplay and press coverage. They also received label support from Mammoth Records in North Carolina. Blake Babies disbanded in 1992 but briefly reunited in 2001 to release another album.

After Blake Babies disbanded, Hatfield joined the Lemonheads as their bassist, replacing founding member Jesse Peretz. She played on their breakthrough 1992 album, It's a Shame About Ray. After about a year, she left the band but returned in 1993 as a guest vocalist on several tracks of Come on Feel the Lemonheads.

In 1992, Hatfield released her debut solo album, Hey Babe.

Hatfield was profiled in several girls' magazines, most notably Sassy, where she addressed serious issues faced by young women in her songs and interviews. Reflecting on this period, she said, "I was never comfortable with the attention. I thought it had come too soon. I hadn't earned it yet."

=== The Juliana Hatfield Three ===
Her commercial breakthrough came in 1993 when she formed the band the Juliana Hatfield Three. Along with her high-school friend Dean Fisher on bass and former Bullet LaVolta drummer Todd Philips, she handled lead vocals and lead guitar duties. The band released the album Become What You Are and two hit singles, "My Sister" and "Spin the Bottle."

"My Sister" was inspired by Hatfield's older brother's girlfriend, Maggie Rafferty, who lived with the family while Hatfield was in high school. Hatfield enjoyed Rafferty's eclectic record collection and was also introduced to live music, as Rafferty took her to see the Del Fuegos and the Violent Femmes, which inspired Hatfield to form a band.

"Spin the Bottle" was featured on the soundtrack of the film Reality Bites (1994). Hatfield also made the cover of Spin magazine.

=== Return to solo career ===
The Juliana Hatfield Three remained together only through 1994. By 1995, Hatfield had returned to solo status and released the album Only Everything, in which she "turned up the volume and the distortion and had a lot of fun." One reviewer described it as "a fun, engaging pop album." The album produced another alternative radio hit for Hatfield with "Universal Heartbeat." In the video, Hatfield portrayed a demanding aerobics instructor. Before the tour for Only Everything, she released Phillips and hired Jason Sutter on drums, Ed Slanker on guitar, and Lisa Mednick on keyboards. However, two weeks into the tour, she canceled it due to depression.

In her memoir, Hatfield writes that she was suffering from depression severe enough to be suicidal. She disagreed with the decision to avoid talking about her depression. The drummer was replaced by Phillips, and touring resumed with Jeff Buckley as the opening act.

In 1996, Hatfield traveled to Woodstock, New York, where she recorded tracks for God's Foot, which was intended to be her fourth solo album (or third, if Become What You Are—recorded with The Juliana Hatfield Three—is not counted). The album was planned for release in 1997. After three unsuccessful attempts to satisfy Atlantic Records' requests for a single, she asked to be released from her contract. The label agreed but retained the rights to the songs recorded during these sessions. "Mountains of Love" and "Fade Away" were later released on a greatest hits collection titled Gold Stars, while "Can't Kill Myself" was made available for download on Hatfield's website. The remaining tracks surfaced on bootlegs, which she disapproved of, and she has rarely performed them live.

In 1997, Hatfield toured with Lilith Fair, an all-female rock festival co-founded by singer Sarah McLachlan.

After the experience of God's Foot and being freed from her label obligations, Hatfield recorded the EP Please Do Not Disturb for the independent label Bar/None. Produced by Hatfield, the album featured drummer Todd Phillips, guitarists Ed Slanker and Mike Leahy, and bassist Mikey Welsh of Weezer. The EP included "Trying Not to Think About It," a tribute to her friend and deceased musician Jeff Buckley.

Almost as a reaction to the seemingly endless studio sessions surrounding God's Foot, Hatfield recorded the album Bed in 1998 in just six days. About the album, she said on her website, "It sounds as raw as I felt. It has no pretty sheen. The mistakes and unattractive parts were left in, not erased. Just like my career. Just like life."

In 2000, Hatfield released Beautiful Creature. However, this album left the rockier side of her musical personality unexpressed, so she simultaneously released Juliana's Pony: Total System Failure with Zephan Courtney and Mikey Welsh. She described the latter album as "a loud release of tension" with "lots of long sloppy guitar solos. And no love songs... a not-at-all attractive reaction to the ugly side of humanity, specifically American culture." Billboard called Beautiful Creature "a collection of plaintive demos" and Juliana's Pony "chock-a-block with punk guitar missives." Juliana's Pony: Total System Failure was panned by some critics who preferred the more acoustic Beautiful Creature. On Beautiful Creature, Hatfield worked with musician Davíd Garza, who co-produced much of the album. Wally Gagel, a producer for Sebadoh and Tanya Donelly, helped Hatfield record her most electronica-influenced songs, "Cool Rock Boy" and "Don't Rush Me," which added texture to the otherwise acoustic album.

In 2002, Hatfield released Gold Stars 1992–2002: The Juliana Hatfield Collection. The compilation included singles from her solo albums, two songs from the unreleased God's Foot, a cover of Neil Young's "Only Love Can Break Your Heart," and new songs.

In 2004, Hatfield released In Exile Deo, an attempt at a more commercial sound with input from producers and engineers who had worked with Pink and Avril Lavigne. Hatfield co-produced the album with David Leonard, receiving co-production credits on "Jamie's in Town" and the bright rocker "Sunshine." Critics praised the album, with some calling it her best work since the start of her solo career.

=== Ye Olde Records ===
In contrast, the 2005 album Made in China was recorded in Bellows Falls, Vermont, and Cambridge, Massachusetts, and was released on her own record label, Ye Olde Records. The album had a much rawer feel, with Hatfield playing instruments alongside the band Unbusted and other contributors. For the first time, Hatfield also played drums on at least one track.

John Doe of the band X described the album as "a frighteningly dark and beautiful record filled with stark, angular, truly brutal songs and guitars. This is surely a 'Woman Under the Influence,' though I'm not sure of what." Reviews were mixed, with some appreciating the lo-fi sound while others viewed it as slackness.

The release of Made in China marked the beginning of a trend where Hatfield licensed her music, selling it via her website and through a distribution deal with Red Eye.

In December 2005, Hatfield toured the United States with the band X, whom she had idolized during her teenage years.

In 2006, Hatfield released her first live album, The White Broken Line: Live Recordings. The album featured performances from her tour with X and was her third release on her record label.

Hatfield's ninth studio album, How to Walk Away, was released on August 19, 2008, on Ye Olde Records. The album's heartfelt exploration of the breakup of a relationship resonated with critics, who gave it largely positive reviews, with some hailing it as her best album since In Exile Deo.

Hatfield returned two years later with her tenth studio album, Peace & Love, which was released on Ye Olde Records on February 16, 2010. The album's composition, arrangement, performance, production, engineering, and mixing were all credited solely to Hatfield. The album received mixed reviews, with several critics complaining that its low-key, moody nature worked against the potential of the songs.

In October 2010, Hatfield and Evan Dando played two sold-out acoustic live shows together at The Mercury Lounge in New York. The following month, the duo played sold-out shows in Allston. This tour was followed by five dates on the American East Coast in January 2011.

=== PledgeMusic ===
In April 2011, Hatfield announced her intention to work on a new album via the fan-funding platform PledgeMusic. Fan response was enthusiastic, exceeding 400% of the original project cost. The album was initially going to be titled Speeches Delivered to Animals and Plants, referencing a passage in the John Irving novel The World According to Garp, but Hatfield later changed it to There's Always Another Girl. The new title referred to a song on the album of the same name, which she had written as a defense of Lindsay Lohan after watching her film I Know Who Killed Me.

There's Always Another Girl was released on August 30, 2011, independently on her Ye Olde Records label. However, a downloadable version was made available to contributors a month earlier, on July 27, which was Juliana's birthday. The album has received mostly positive reviews from critics.

On August 28, 2012, Juliana Hatfield released a covers album titled Juliana Hatfield on her Ye Olde Records label. The album features covers of songs originally performed by the Who, Liz Phair, Creedence Clearwater Revival, Ryan Adams, I Blame Coco, and Led Zeppelin.

In December 2014, Paste Magazine named her track "Needle in the Hay," a cover of Elliott Smith's song, as No. 10 on its list of the "20 Best Cover Songs of 2014." The review described the cover as "a more upbeat, approachable take on Smith's disparate, wrought-iron classic. But even though it now employs bass, drums, tambourine, and synth, the song stays true to the sorrowful, tension-riddled original." Also that month, SPIN Magazine named the cover one of the "40 Best 2014 Songs by 1994 Artists," where it ranked No. 36. The review noted, "The tempo's a bit quicker, and she double-tracks herself for the song's entirety. But the (tasteful) inclusion of chintzy drum programming and mellotron cleverly point to Smith's eventual creative direction."

=== Reformation of the Juliana Hatfield Three ===
In 2014, the Juliana Hatfield Three reunited two decades after it disbanded. Hatfield used PledgeMusic to raise funds for the new album, Whatever, My Love, the trio's first since 1993's Become What You Are. Hatfield explained, "We haven't totally reinvented the wheel or anything," adding that the tracks feature "stuff I am sort of known for, I guess. But I am a lot more confident now than I was then with the first album. And I had more fun recording this one." The twelve tracks for Whatever, My Love were recorded at Nuthouse Recording in Hoboken, New Jersey, with Beaujour and Hatfield co-producing. The lead single, "If I Could" was released in December 2014 and premiered in Rolling Stone. That month, the album was made available for pre-order on American Laundromat Records, with an announced release date of February 17, 2015. The band also announced a U.S. tour throughout February, visiting cities on both coasts and in the Midwest, with stops at the Bowery Ballroom in New York City and The Roxy Theatre in Los Angeles.

In late December 2014, Stereogum named the album "one of their most anticipated albums of 2015," and on January 4, 2015, Consequence of Sound listed it as "one of the 50 most anticipated albums of 2015." On January 9, 2015, Hatfield was featured on Nylon.com, which wrote that the upcoming album came across as "unforced, and with its sly lyrics and mega-hooky coffeehouse-grunge aesthetic." The album's second single, "Ordinary Guy," premiered on Consequence of Sound on January 14, 2015.

=== Recent collaborations and solo work ===
In 2015, Hatfield and Paul Westerberg announced that they had formed a new group called the I Don't Cares. They released the album Wild Stab in 2016.

Hatfield issued a forceful rejection of the election of Donald Trump with Pussycat, released in April 2017. With the album title and several song titles overtly referring to the recent election, including "Kellyanne" referring to MAGA campaigner Kellyanne Conway and the mocking "Short-Fingered Man", a common anti-Trump insult similar in style to Fionna Apple's "Tiny Hands", Pussycat was welcomed by critics with an 84 out of 100 score on Metacritic.

Following Pussycat, Hatfield's releases began an alternating pattern, with an album of cover songs followed by an album of original songs. This began in 2018 with the issuing of Juliana Hatfield Sings Olivia Newton-John, a sincere tribute to one of Hatfield's idols, all-time Australian bestseller Olivia Newton-John. Newton-John publicly thanked Hatfield for the album and for donating a portion of sales to her cancer wellness center.

Hatfield followed the tribute with an album of new material that critics saw as focused on self-improvement. Weird was released in January 2019. Later that year, reviewers were impressed with Hatfield's interpretation and punk revitalization efforts on Juliana Hatfield Sings The Police.

During the COVID-19 pandemic, Hatfield began a home recording regimen that resulted in the release of Blood, an original album that included explorations of violence, in May 2021. Hatfield saw Blood revealing the suppression of anger as a debilitating situation for women, and herself as remedying the condition through songwriting and music.

Hatfield had hinted that her next covers album would focus on the work of an American artist, having already covered an Australian (Olivia Newton-John) and an English band (The Police). In an interview for the book I'm Your Fan: The Songs of Leonard Cohen, Hatfield revealed that she was considering R.E.M. for her next covers album installment. However, the follow-up ended up covering Electric Light Orchestra. The album, Juliana Hatfield Sings ELO, was released on November 17, 2023.

During 2023, Hatfield left her apartment in Cambridge and moved to Western Massachusetts. She told Noah Schaffer of WBUR that with the move she had dreamt of a quiet rural life living with her dog, near a close friend, but both the friend and her pet passed away. The loneliness that resulted prompted her to remark in the interview "one person’s tranquility is another person’s terrifying silence." Her following studio album, late 2025's Lightning Might Strike, was recorded in her new home with remote accompaniments, and explores fate and handling psychological trauma in its songs.

Hatfield and fellow musician and artist Eric Payne released Bets, a surprise album of eleven collaborative songs that was recorded prior to Lightning Might Strike, in late February, 2026. American Laundromat Records announced a vinyl reissue of Hatfield's 2011 album There's Always Another Girl that will feature a D-side collection of her reading spoken word versions of songs on the album, scheduled for release November 20, 2026. A remastered CD release of the album with the spoken tracks and featuring new sleeve artwork will also be issued.

== Musical style ==
=== Style and influences ===
From her work with the Blake Babies to the present, Hatfield's music has alternated between heavy, rocking tunes and gentler, more melodic or folk-oriented songs. She has stated that in the 1990s, she briefly tried smoking cigarettes in hopes of giving her voice a rougher quality but eventually reconciled herself with her distinctive vocal style.

Hatfield's musical influences are diverse, ranging from punk bands like X, the Stooges, and the Replacements to more folk-oriented rock artists like Neil Young, whose songs the Blake Babies frequently covered in live shows. Her work has also intersected with contemporaneous indie rock bands such as Dinosaur Jr. and the Lemonheads, whose members are also her friends.

From an early age, she has had a particular love for melodic pop music. In a 1998 interview, she stated, "I just always liked pop music and really good melodies and major chords. That's just the type of music that comes naturally to me." In a 1993 interview with Melody Maker, Hatfield mentioned that her enthusiasm for the pop group Wilson Phillips apparently contributed, at least in part, to the breakup of the Blake Babies.

=== Lyrics ===
Hatfield describes herself as very shy and somewhat of a loner, stating that "happy lyrics don't come naturally to me." She has characterized her music and songwriting as a form of therapy, providing an outlet that helps her navigate difficult times and depression.

== Collaborations ==
Hatfield has also recorded with the Lemonheads, living for a time with Evan Dando in Boston's college neighborhood of Allston. She has contributed backing vocals to recordings by Belly, Giant Sand, Susanna Hoffs, Aimee Mann, and Mary Lou Lord. In 1999, she teamed up with Dando to record Gram Parsons's song "$1,000 Wedding" for the compilation Return of the Grievous Angel: A Tribute to Gram Parsons.

=== Some Girls ===
In 2001, Hatfield joined Freda Love and Heidi Gluck (of the Pieces and the Only Children) to form the trio Some Girls, performing alongside her solo work. The group has toured the United States twice and released two albums, serving as an outlet for Hatfield's more lighthearted material. Their first album, Feel It, was released by Koch Records in 2003, featuring the lead single "Necessito", a funky affirmation of the power of music sung in a mix of English and Spanish. Some Girls' second album, Crushing Love, was released in July 2006.

=== Frank Smith ===
In 2007, Hatfield signed the Boston (now Austin)-based band Frank Smith to her record label, Ye Olde Records. In addition to releasing their 2007 album Heavy Handed Peace and Love, she recorded an EP with the band titled Sittin' in a Tree. Produced by Frank Smith's Aaron Sinclair, the EP features banjos, pedal steel, and other instruments typically associated with country music.

=== Minor Alps ===
Hatfield and Matthew Caws of Nada Surf formed a band called Minor Alps, releasing their first album, Get There, on October 29, 2013, via Barsuk Records.

Julie Gayet appears in the music video for Minor Alps' song "Waiting for You".

=== The I Don't Cares ===
Hatfield and Paul Westerberg formed the I Don't Cares, releasing Wild Stab on January 22, 2016, via Dry Wood Records.

=== Eric Payne ===
Hatfield announced the surprise release of a collaboration with Northampton, Massachusetts musician and artist Eric Payne on February 27, 2026. The album Bets was recorded before Hatfield's late 2025 solo release Lightning Might Strike with Payne, whom Hatfield described as "a talented carpenter and visual artist" and designer of the cover for the album. Bets features eleven songs, with music by Payne and lyrics and vocals by Hatfield, with the exception of a cover of "Sugar Town", a 1966 Nancy Sinatra hit written by Lee Hazlewood.

== Writing and acting ==
Beyond her musical accomplishments, Hatfield has guest-starred on several television shows, including The Adventures of Pete & Pete as a lunch lady and the 1994 Christmas episode of the cult classic My So-Called Life as a deceased homeless girl who becomes an angel. During the mid-1990s, she was a staple on MTV's 120 Minutes alternative music program and performed on The Late Show with David Letterman and Late Night with Conan O'Brien in 1995.

On March 25, 2008, Hatfield began her own blog through her website titled An Arm and A Leg. The blog lasted about a year before being removed. Each week, or thereabouts, she revealed the influences behind one of her songs.

Hatfield briefly appeared on an episode of Space Ghost Coast to Coast titled "Surprise", which aired on June 19, 1996. Instead of being interviewed, she simply said "uhh" and was then zapped by Zorak.

Hatfield released the book When I Grow Up: A Memoir on September 22, 2008.

Harmonizing With Myself, with the same title as a song on her 2025 album Lightning Might Strike, is a platform for music memoir and commentary started by Hatfield in late Winter 2025 on Substack.

== Personal life ==
Hatfield has been a vegetarian for many years. She has been open about her struggles with depression, anorexia, and disordered eating.

She briefly dated musician and collaborator Ryan Adams in 2008.

In 2006, she moved to Cambridge, Massachusetts. After 15 years living in Central Square, Cambridge, in 2023 Hatfield moved to a larger home near Amherst, Massachusetts, where she records at her home studio.

In 1992, she gained notoriety for revealing in Interview magazine that she was still a virgin in her mid-twenties. In a 1994 interview with Vox, she expressed surprise at the reaction to her 'outing': "I think there are a lot of people out there who don't care about sex, but who you never hear from, so I thought I should say it. The magazine I did the interview for is full of beefcake hunky guys and scantily clad models, so I thought it would be really funny to say that I didn't care about sex in a magazine that's full of sex and beauty – but no one really got the joke."

Over the years, Hatfield's virginity became a recurring theme in her press coverage, often accompanied by speculation that she had lost it to the Lemonheads' leader, Evan Dando, who referred to her as his "friend and sometimes girlfriend." In 2006, Hatfield sent a letter to The Weekly Dig in response to writer Debbie Driscoll's scathing review of Soul Asylum's latest album, The Silver Lining. Kevin Dean from the newspaper responded by bringing up the subject of Hatfield losing her virginity to Dando. Hatfield fired back at Dean for bringing up her sex life, clarifying that she and Dando never had sex, and revealing that it was actually Spike Jonze to whom she had lost her virginity. She later admitted that she lost her virginity at 26 and was "damn ready."

== Discography ==
=== Studio albums ===
- Hey Babe (1992)
- Become What You Are (1993)
- Only Everything (1995)
- God's Foot (unreleased by Atlantic) (1996)
- Bed (1998)
- Beautiful Creature (2000)
- Juliana's Pony: Total System Failure (2000)
- In Exile Deo (2004)
- Made in China (2005)
- How to Walk Away (2008)
- Peace & Love (2010)
- There's Always Another Girl (2011)
- Juliana Hatfield (2012)
- Wild Animals (2013)
- Whatever, My Love (2015)
- Pussycat (2017)
- Juliana Hatfield Sings Olivia Newton-John (2018)
- Weird (2019)
- Juliana Hatfield Sings The Police (2019)
- Blood (2021)
- Juliana Hatfield Sings ELO (2023)
- Lightning Might Strike (2025)

=== Blake Babies ===
- Nicely, Nicely (1987)
- Earwig (1989)
- Sunburn (1990)
- God Bless the Blake Babies (2001)

=== The Lemonheads ===
- It's a Shame About Ray (1992)
- Come on Feel the Lemonheads (1993)

=== Some Girls ===
- Feel It (2003)
- Crushing Love (2006)

=== Minor Alps ===
- Get There (2013)

=== The I Don't Cares ===
- Wild Stab (2016)

=== Juliana Hatfield and Eric Payne ===
- Bets (2026)

== Books ==
- Hatfield, Juliana (2008). When I Grow Up: A Memoir. Wiley Publishing. ISBN 978-047-018959-7. 336 pp.
