= Sittin' in a Tree =

Sittin' in a Tree...

EP by Juliana Hatfield and Frank Smith
- Released: May 27, 2007
- Genre: Alternative rock
- Length: 22:53
- Label: Ye Olde Records
- Producer: Aaron Sinclair; Scott Toomey

Juliana Hatfield and Frank Smith chronology
Made in China (2005)	Sittin' in a Tree... (2007)	How to Walk Away (2008)

Sittin' in a Tree... is an EP by Juliana Hatfield and Frank Smith that was released in 2007.

== Track listing ==
All tracks are written by Juliana Hatfield except where noted.

No.	Title	Length
1.	"364" (Juliana Hatfield, Jason Hatfield)	4:21
2.	"Don't Wanna Be the One"	3:36
3.	"A Beer and a Shot"	3:58
4.	"If Only We Were Dogs"	4:04
5.	"Kitten"	2:40
6.	"On Your Mind"	4:19
Total length:		22:53

== Personnel ==
- Juliana Hatfield – vocals and guitar
- Aaron Sinclair – guitar, vocals, drums on "Kitten"
- Scott Toomey – guitar, keyboards, and vocals
- Brett Saiia – banjo and vocals
- Steve Malone – pedal steel guitar
- Dan Burke – bass
- Drew Roach – drums

== Production ==
- Producer: Aaron Sinclair and Scott Toomey
- Engineer: Scott Toomey
- Mixing: Scott Toomey and Aaron Sinclair
- Mastering: Nick Zampiello
- Design: Jordyn Bonds
