= Beautiful Creature =

Studio album by Juliana Hatfield
- Released: May 16, 2000
- Studio: Fort Apache, Cambridge, Massachusetts
- Genre: Alternative rock
- Length: 48:11
- Label: Zoë/Island
- Producer: Juliana Hatfield, Wally Gagel, Davíd Garza, Andy Kravitz, Scott Litt

Juliana Hatfield chronology
Bed (1998)	Beautiful Creature (2000)	Juliana's Pony: Total System Failure (2000)

Beautiful Creature is the fourth solo album by American singer-songwriter Juliana Hatfield, released on May 16, 2000. It was released simultaneously with Juliana's Pony: Total System Failure.

== Release ==
A collectors' edition of both Beautiful Creature and Juliana's Pony: Total System Failure was also simultaneously released. It contained a third enhanced CD that included a Juliana Hatfield screensaver, a photo gallery consisting of six pictures, a web link to Hatfield's webpage at Zoë Records, a cover of The Police's "Every Breath You Take", "When You Loved Me" (Mex Mix) and an open letter from Hatfield to her fans. The letter read as follows:

I was living in Los Angeles. I seemed to have fallen for an image (deep down, I'm really shallow). It was so beautiful. His eyes were black. But as I walked down my street, all the neighborhood dogs seemed trained to attack. And the sun was like a deathray.

This is a dangerous business. People aren't always what they seem, even when they think they are telling the truth. All motivations are hidden.

I had planned on staying a year, but after six months, I became restless enough to leave. Always wanting to be somewhere I'm not, content only when en route. Music sounds better in a moving car.

Where am I now? I'm still here. In between. Thank you for asking. Without you, I may have ceased to exist.

Juliana Hatfield

"Every Breath You Take" and "When You Loved Me" (Mex Mix) (instead referred to as the "US Mix") appear as bonus tracks on the Japanese edition.

== Critical reception ==
Professional ratings
Aggregate scores
Source	Rating
Metacritic	66/100
Review scores
Source	Rating
AllMusic	4/5 stars
Entertainment Weekly	B−
Spin	6/10
The Village Voice	(dud)

Beautiful Creature received far more favorable reviews from critics than Juliana's Pony: Total System Failure. It was described as a "Stripped down, intimate work that harkened back to Hatfield's early 90s material."

Scripp's Howard News Service's Mark Brown ranked both Beautiful Creature and Juliana's Pony: Total System Failure as #5 on his list of the top 10 albums of 2000.

== Track listing ==
All tracks are written by Juliana Hatfield, except where noted.

No.	Title	Writer(s)	Length
1.	"Daniel"		4:31
2.	"Close Your Eyes"		3:21
3.	"Choose Drugs"		3:41
4.	"Cool Rock Boy"	Wally Gagel, Hatfield	4:00
5.	"Don't Rush Me"	Gagel, Hatfield	4:01
6.	"Slow Motion"		2:53
7.	"Might Be in Love"		2:45
8.	"Somebody Is Waiting for Me"		3:24
9.	"Until Tomorrow"		4:44
10.	"The Easy Way Out"		3:23
11.	"Hotels"		4:28
12.	"When You Loved Me"		3:30
13.	"Cry in the Dark"		3:43
Total length:			48:14

Japanese edition
No.	Title	Writer(s)	Length
14.	"Every Breath You Take"	Sting	3:49
15.	"When You Loved Me" (US Mix)		3:34
Total length:			55:37

== Personnel ==
Musicians

- Juliana Hatfield – vocals, guitar, bass guitar, harmonica
- Jim Boggia – guitar, background vocals
- Brian Brown – electric piano
- Davíd Garza – bass guitar, guitar, piano, drums
- John Thomasson – bass guitar
- Duke Roth – cello
- Michael Hale – drums, percussion
- Andy Kravitz – drums, keyboards
- Scott Litt – drums
- Todd Philips – drums
- Damon Richardson – drums
- Jason Sutter – drums

Technical

- Producers: Juliana Hatfield, Wally Gagel, Davíd Garza, Andy Kravitz, Scott Litt
- Engineers: Brian Brown, Matthew Ellard, Keith Floyd, Wally Gagel, Andy Kravitz, Scott Litt
- Assistant engineer: Victor Janacua
- Mixing: Wally Gagel
- Mastering: Brian Lee, Dr. Toby Mountain
- Recorder: Wally Gagel
- Programming: Wally Gagel
- Photography: Gary Smith
