= Made in China (album) =

Studio album by Juliana Hatfield
- Released: August 9, 2005
- Recorded: 2005
- Genre: Alternative rock
- Length: 37:28
- Label: Ye Olde
- Producer: Juliana Hatfield

Juliana Hatfield chronology
In Exile Deo (2004)	Made in China (2005)	Sittin' in a Tree (2007)

Professional ratings
Aggregate scores
Source	Rating
Metacritic	63/100
Review scores
Source	Rating
AllMusic	4.5/5 stars
Entertainment Weekly	C
Rolling Stone	2/5 stars

Made in China is the seventh album by Juliana Hatfield, released in 2005.

== Track listing ==
All tracks are written by Juliana Hatfield, except where noted.

No.	Title	Writer(s)	Length
1.	"New Waif"		2:10
2.	"What Do I Care?"		2:39
3.	"Stay Awake"	Hatfield, Joe Keefe	2:22
4.	"On Video"	Hatfield, Joe Keefe	2:37
5.	"Hole in the Sky"		2:54
6.	"Oh"		3:44
7.	"My Pet Lion"		2:49
8.	"Going Blonde"		1:19
9.	"Rats in the Attic"		3:14
10.	"Digital Penetration"		4:31
11.	"A Doe and Two Fawns"		4:00
12.	"Send Money"		4:45
Total length:			37:28

== Personnel ==
- Juliana Hatfield – vocals, guitar, bass guitar, drums
- Joe Keefe – guitar
- Ben Smith – bass guitar
- Ed Valauskas – bass guitar
- Pete Caldes – drums
- Sebastian Keefe – drums

Production

- Producer: Juliana Hatfield
- Engineer: Brian Brown and Paul Q. Kolderie
- Mixing: Brian Brown and Paul Q. Kolderie
- Mastering: Greg Calbi
- Design: Mary Lynch
- Photography and artwork: Juliana Hatfield
