= My Sister (Juliana Hatfield song) =

1993 single by the Juliana Hatfield Three

Single by the Juliana Hatfield Three

from the album Become What You Are
- B-side: "A Dame with a Rod"; "Put It Away"
- Released: August 16, 1993
- Studio: Hollywood Sound Recorders (Hollywood, California)
- Genre: Alternative rock
- Length: 3:22
- Label: Mammoth; Atlantic
- Songwriter: Juliana Hatfield
- Producer: Scott Litt

The Juliana Hatfield Three singles chronology
"I See You" (1992)	"My Sister" (1993)	"For the Birds" (1993)

Music video
- "My Sister" on YouTube

"My Sister" is a song written by American singer-songwriter Juliana Hatfield, recorded with her band the Juliana Hatfield Three, released as the lead single from Hatfield's second studio album, Become What You Are. After a period of working with fellow rock artists the Lemonheads following the breakup of her first band, Blake Babies, Hatfield recruited drummer Todd Philips and bassist Dean Fisher to form the Juliana Hatfield Three, who then recorded Become What You Are and "My Sister". Contrary to the content of the song, Hatfield does not have a sister, and inspiration was drawn from an older woman whom she saw as a sister figure.

Released in August 1993, "My Sister" became the biggest hit of Hatfield's career, reaching number one on the US Billboard Modern Rock Tracks chart. It also became a minor hit in the United Kingdom, peaking at number 71 on the UK Singles Chart. In Australia, the song peaked at number 99 on the ARIA Singles Chart and appeared on the 1993 Triple J Hottest 100 list at number 37.

== History ==
In an interview with Spin magazine, Hatfield stated the song came about due to her fixation on existential longing. "I feel like something's missing," she said. "I almost feel like I have a twin who died at birth but no one ever told me that the twin existed. And with this song, I was trying to explore the idea of a sister who I never had." In real life, Hatfield has two brothers, and to write the song, she put herself in the place of the "sister" role, trying to see herself from her brothers' points of view. However, Hatfield also drew inspiration from a woman named Meg Rafferty, who was seven years older than her and whom Hatfield saw as an older sister. Rafferty dated one of her brothers and even lived with the Hatfield family for a while, making the experience more authentic. However, Rafferty never knew "My Sister" was partly about her until she read Hatfield's book When I Grow Up: A Memoir, released in 2008.

Drummer Todd Philips first heard "My Sister" before bassist Dean Fisher joined the group. "Juliana broke it out at the practice, and the second I heard it, I thought it was just awesome," he said. Once Fisher joined during touring for Hatfield's debut solo album Hey Babe, Philips played the song for him and he too liked it. Philips had trouble composing the intro with his drums, but after continuously listening to a song called "We Love You Carol and Alison" from American power pop band Game Theory's album Lolita Nation, in which the band's drummer Gil Ray plays the tom-tom drums instead of the hi-hats during the verses, he copied that strategy for "My Sister." Scott Litt, who had produced R.E.M.'s well-received album Automatic for the People, was brought in to produce Become What You Are. Philips stated, "Scott made us feel comfortable. We wanted to work with him because we were really taken by Automatic for the People. I thought that was R.E.M.'s best record. We listened to it in the van a lot on the Hey Babe tour. I couldn't believe how cool he was. It felt like a family." According to Litt, a lot of mixing was not necessary, as he felt Hatfield was good at leading the band and making the tracks sound good.

== Content ==
The song lacks a chorus, as Hatfield could not come up with one, but Litt stated it did not need one. Lyrically, the song points out some of the bad qualities of the narrator's sister ("I hate my sister, she's such a bitch / She acts as if she doesn't even know that I exist"), but most of the song has the narrator praising her sister ("I love my sister, she's the best / She's cooler than any other girl that I have ever met"). One of the lyrics, "She's the one who would have taken me / To my first all-ages show" refers to a Del Fuegos and Violent Femmes concert that Hatfield attended with Meg Rafferty on the latter's birthday in Boston, sometime around 1982 or 1983. This concert was a turning point for Hatfield, as she realized she could start a band and not turn into a household name in the process. Hatfield commented that the song overall is about her personal struggles, discovering her identity, and bettering herself.

== Music video ==
A music video was created for the song. The first part features the three band members performing the song in a room with a red backdrop. The room is dimly lit, with spotlights shining on the members, but at certain points the room brightens for a few seconds before going dark again. Occasionally, Hatfield and Fisher make extravagant movements while playing their instruments, including a clip where Hatfield walks up to Fisher and kicks in his direction. During the guitar solo, the scene changes to a silvery, bright room with a tinsel-like backdrop, and the band members are dressed in blue outfits rather than black. After this, the red room returns, with Hatfield sitting alone and singing into a microphone with its cord heading toward the camera, mimicking the music video for "Roxanne" by the Police. The silver room returns for the next guitar solo, featuring many quick camera cuts that sometimes reveal the brightly lit room to be behind the curtains of the red room. During the last verse, Hatfield moves from the shiny room to the red room, whose curtains close behind her. The final guitar solo takes place in the red room, as well as the remainder of the video, and features flashing lights that briefly illuminates the members in the dark room. The final shot of the music video features Hatfield lying motionless with her guitar on the floor of the bright room.

== Reception ==
=== Commercial performance ===
It actually wasn't meant as a "diss" at all. I was and am a fan of Juliana's. We were both on Atlantic along with about 14 other female songwriters. I was brand new and was annoyed by the whole, "There are so many girls with guitars and we are all the same" thing [in the press], so I wrote the song as a sarcastic response, a joke really. The song got a little press, a "blip" on the radar for me. What sucked about it was, I think people thought I was hating on Juliana, and I wasn't coming from that place at all. It was meant more as a general statement on the scene at the time.

— Melissa Ferrick, commenting on how her song "The Juliana Hatfield Song (Girls with Guitars)" caused her more trouble than she expected.

"My Sister" became the biggest hit of Hatfield's career. Although it did not chart on the US Billboard Hot 100, a feat that follow-up singles "Spin the Bottle" and "Universal Heart-Beat" did, it managed to peak at number 12 on the Bubbling Under Hot 100, a position roughly equivalent to number 112 on the Hot 100. It also reached number one on the Billboard Modern Rock Tracks chart. It first appeared on the aforementioned chart at number 11 on the issue dated August 7, 1993, becoming the week's second-highest debut after the Red Hot Chili Peppers' "Soul to Squeeze", which charted at number six. Over the next few weeks, "My Sister" steadily worked its way up the chart, reaching number two on September 4. The next week, September 11, the song ended "Soul to Squeeze"'s four-week stint at the summit. It stayed at the top spot for only one week, losing the number-one position to Blind Melon's "No Rain" on September 18. The single remained on the chart for six more weeks, dropping out of the chart from number 27 on October 30.

Outside the United States, "My Sister" became a minor chart hit in the United Kingdom and Australia. On the UK Singles Chart, the song debuted at number 71 on the week beginning September 5, 1993, then dropped out of the top 75 the next week. The song also gained some attention in Australia, despite reaching only number 99 on the ARIA Singles Chart; it was a popular radio hit on the Triple J radio station, which tends to appeal to listeners of alternative music. In January 1994, the song appeared on the 1993 Triple J Hottest 100 countdown, ranking at number 37. It was also featured on the official compilation album for the countdown, but when it was reissued in 2004, "I Feel You" by Depeche Mode replaced "My Sister" on the track list.

=== Melissa Ferrick response ===
After "My Sister" became a success, an answer song was created by Massachusetts folk singer Melissa Ferrick entitled "The Juliana Hatfield Song (Girls with Guitars)". Hatfield and Philips were surprised by this response, especially since Ferrick and the Hatfield Three were recording both their songs at the same time in Los Angeles and even went out for drinks with each other. Ferrick claims, however, that the track was not meant to be hurtful. In the end, Hatfield let this incident pass without complaint, understanding that a few people may have been sour toward her sudden success.

== Track listings ==
US 7-inch single

A1. "My Sister" – 3:22
B1. "A Dame with a Rod" (demo version) – 3:06
B2. "Put It Away" – 2:08

UK 7-inch vinyl

1. "My Sister" – 3:22
2. "Put It Away" – 2:02

UK CD single

1. "My Sister" – 3:22
2. "Put It Away" – 2:02
3. "A Dame with a Rod" (demo version) – 2:55
4. "Ruthless" – 1:58

== Credits and personnel ==
Credits are adapted from the UK CD single liner notes.

Studios

- Recorded at Hollywood Sound Recorders (Hollywood, California, US)
- Mixed at Ocean Way Recording (Los Angeles, California, US)

Personnel

- Juliana Hatfield – writing
- Scott Litt – production, engineering
- Ed Brooks – engineering assistant
- Martin Schmelzle – recording assistant
- Steve Holroyd – mixing assistant

== Charts ==
=== Weekly charts ===
Chart (1993)	Peak position
Australia (ARIA)	99
UK Singles (Official Charts)	71
US Bubbling Under Hot 100 (Billboard)	12
US Modern Rock Tracks (Billboard)	1

=== Year-end charts ===
Chart (1993)	Position
US Modern Rock Tracks (Billboard)	12

== Release history ==
Region	Date	Format(s)	Label(s)	Ref.
Australia	August 16, 1993	CD; cassette	Mammoth; White	
United Kingdom	August 30, 1993	7-inch vinyl; 10-inch vinyl; CD; cassette	Mammoth; EastWest	
