= Hey Babe =

Studio album by Juliana Hatfield
- Released: March 17, 1992
- Recorded: 1991
- Studio: Fort Apache (Cambridge, Massachusetts)
- Genre: Alternative rock; power pop
- Length: 43:01
- Label: Mammoth
- Producer: Gary Smith

Juliana Hatfield chronology
Hey Babe (1992)	Become What You Are (1993)

Singles from Album
- 1. "Everybody Loves Me but You" Released: 1992; 2. "Forever Baby" Released: 1992; 3. "I See You" Released: 1992

Hey Babe is the debut solo album by American musician Juliana Hatfield, released in 1992.

== Critical reception ==
Professional ratings
Review scores
Source	Rating
AllMusic	4.5/5 stars
Chicago Tribune	3/4 stars
Classic Pop	4/5 stars
Entertainment Weekly	B+
NME	7/10
The Philadelphia Inquirer	4/4 stars
Q	3/5 stars
Rolling Stone	3.5/5 stars
Select	4/5
Uncut	8/10

The New York Times noted that the album tends "toward bubblegum-sweet melodies and quirky little romantic narratives using the half-mature language of a collegiate creative-writing class."

In a 2018 article, The Guardian referred to the album as a "largely forgotten minor masterpiece."

== Track listing ==
All tracks are written by Juliana Hatfield, with track 2 co-written by John Strohm.

No.	Title	Length
1.	"Everybody Loves Me but You"	3:37
2.	"Lost and Saved"	3:59
3.	"I See You"	3:33
4.	"The Lights"	5:22
5.	"Nirvana"	4:05
6.	"Forever Baby"	3:08
7.	"Ugly"	3:14
8.	"No Outlet"	4:01
9.	"Quit"	3:44
10.	"Get Off Your Knees"	2:52
11.	"No Answer"	5:26
Total length:		43:01

== Personnel ==
Credits adapted from CD liner notes.

- Juliana Hatfield – vocals (all tracks), guitar (2–11), bass guitar (1–6, 8, 9, 11), "horns" (2)
- Evan Dando – guitar (1, 4), vocals (1, 2)
- Chick Graning – slide guitar (8), EBow (8)
- Mike Leahy – guitar (1, 2, 4, 6, 10, 11)
- Gary Smith – guitar (6)
- Clay Tarver – guitar (5, 10)
- Paul Trudeau – drums (3, 8, 9)
- Michael Wegner – guitar (8, 9)
- Mike Watt – bass (10)
- Todd Philips – drums (1, 2, 4–6, 10, 11)
- John Wesley Harding – vocals (2, 3)

Production

- Gary Smith – producer
- Steve Balcom – executive producer
- Jay Faires – executive producer
- Adam Lasus – engineer
- Carl Plaster – engineer
- Paul Q. Kolderie – mixing
- Sean Slade – mixing
- Greg Calbi – mastering
