= American Laundromat Records =

- Founded: 2004
- Founder: Joseph H. Spadaro
- Distributor: AMPED, Alliance, Ingram, Mid West
- Genre: Indie rock
- Country of origin: U.S.
- Location: Mystic, Connecticut
- Official website: www.alr-music.com

American Laundromat Records is an independent record label founded in 2004 by Joe Spadaro.

ALR specializes in almost annual indie rock compilation albums, which have included tracks by OK Go, The Dresden Dolls, and The Watson Twins. Compilation tributes have been dedicated to the Pixies, The Cure, Kim Deal, Neil Young, The Smiths, and the 1984 film Repo Man. The release of a double-CD tribute album to Wes Anderson, I Saved Latin!, was released in May 2014 and includes covers of David Bowie and The Kinks.

== History ==
=== Founding ===
American Laundromat Records was founded in April 2004 by Joe Spadaro in Huntington Village, New York on Long Island. According to Spadaro, he used a small tax-refund to produce the compilation album Transistor, which featured eight indie bands contributing two original songs each. The bands, including The Atomic Hep Cats and AM, were mostly on the East coast. Transistor had moderate success on college radio.

After several more releases, in the summer of 2006 the label relocated to Mystic, Connecticut. That year the label secured international distribution through Darla Records. Besides releasing debut EPs, LPs, and compilations, in 2007 ALR began a 7" vinyl series of split singles featuring tracks from the label's network of indie bands.

=== Label signings ===
In 2005, the label began distributing Brooklyn-based all-girl indie band the Caulfield Sisters' debut EP Say It With Fire. The band was afterwards named one of "NYC’s 10 Bands to Watch" by Time Out New York. The band was invited to perform on KEXP's Morning Show with John in NYC, and opened for Interpol. In 2009 ALR released Julie Peel's debut album Near The Sun. After the release Peel received an early invitation to showcase at SXSW in 2010, and tracks were placed in TV shows such as CW's Life Unexpected. The label also releases music by Dylan in the Movies.

In late 2013 the label signed a new band: Tele Novella, an indie group based in Austin, Texas. The pop foursome has members from a number of previous bands: guitarist/vocalist Natalie Ribbons, bassist Jason Chronis, drummer Matt Simon, and Sarah La Puerta. Ribbons was previously with Agent Ribbons, while Chronis and Simon were previously with indie band Voxtrot. They have a 7" single, "Trouble in Paradise," that came out on April 22, 2014.

Whatever, My Love is an album by The Juliana Hatfield Three, consisting of Hatfield, drummer Todd Philips, and bassist Dean Fisher. This is the band's first album in twenty two years. The lead single, "If I Could," was released in December 2014 and was premiered in Rolling Stone.

=== Film ===
In 2013 American Laundromat Records added a movie section to their website, and began taking orders for the Criterion Collection release of Repo Man on Blu-ray and DVD.

=== Compilations ===
High School Reunion - a tribute to those great 80's films!

After the success of the initial 2004 compilation, Transistor, the label began releasing indie rock-themed compilations and artist tributes on an almost yearly basis. In the fall of 2005 ALR produced its second record High School Reunion - a tribute to those great 80's films!, featuring indie-rockers such as Frank Black, Kristin Hersh, and The Dresden Dolls, and covering songs from 80's teen films. All Music Guide called the project "One of the finest tribute records ever amassed," going on to say "let this serve as a blueprint for all future tribute sets." Pitchfork, Rolling Stone, VH1, Billboard, Spin, NME, and other publications covered the project as well.

Artist tributes (Pixies, Neil Young, Kim, The Cure)

Afterwards came Dig For Fire - a tribute to Pixies, Cinnamon Girl - Women Artists Cover Neil Young for Charity and Gigantic - a tribute to Kim Deal. The projects included contributions by bands such as They Might Be Giants, OK Go, Mogwai, and The Rosebuds. In 2008 ALR began production on Just Like Heaven - a tribute to The Cure which was officially released on January 27, 2009. The latter was co-produced by Joe Spadaro, who produced a number of the other compilations as well. It featured covers by artists such as Tanya Donelly, The Brunettes, and Grand Duchy. The album had a positive reception, and acknowledgement from Robert Smith.

Sing Me To Sleep - Indie Lullabies

In 2010 ALR released Sing Me To Sleep - Indie Lullabies, a collection of lullabies and popular songs re-imagined as lullabies by indie artists. All proceeds from the project are donated to The Valerie Fund, a non-profit for children with cancer and blood disorders. Among the artists who contributed are Dean & Britta, Say Hi, and Sigur Rós. Release shows with live performances by The Leisure Society, The Real Tuesday Weld, Tanya Donelly, Jenny Owen Youngs, and Julie Peel were held in tandem with the release in London and New York City.

The Smiths, Repo Man

Please Please Please: A Tribute To The Smiths was released in late 2011, with tracks by Elk City, Greg Laswell, Cinerama, Stars, and others, with Spadaro again producing. A Tribute To Repo Man was released in 2012, featuring artists such as The Tellers and Matthew Sweet. The 1984 film had a soundtrack featuring punk rock by artists like Iggy Pop and Black Flag.

I Saved Latin! A Tribute to Wes Anderson

In May 2014 American Laundromat Records released I Saved Latin!, a double-CD tribute compilation to film director Wes Anderson. In November 2013 ALR had opened up their website for pre-orders, selling a "deluxe" edition that includes a vinyl single and various clothing and objects themed to Anderson's films and characters. Among the covered artists are The Kinks, the Rolling Stones, David Bowie and The Zombies. Juliana Hatfield covers Elliott Smith's "Needle in the Hay," which was used in The Royal Tennenbaums, while Someone Still Loves You Boris Yeltsin covers "Margaret Yang's Theme" from Rushmore, which was originally made for the film by Mark Mothersbaugh. Other covers include Matt Pond's version of Nico's "These Days," and John Lennon's "Oh Yoko!" by The Ghost in You.

The album was received positively by critics, with NME calling it "cohesive and pleasingly idiosyncratic," and Delusions of Adequacy stating that "most of [the songs] embrace a shared autumnal aesthetic, which closely adheres to Anderson’s whimsical vision."

== Artists ==
Current roster

- Caulfield Sisters
- Tanya Donelly
- Dragon Inn 3
- Juliana Hatfield

Featured on compilations

- 9-Fifty
- The Abbasi Brothers
- AM
- The Atomic Hep Cats
- Bastards of Melody
- The Bedroom Walls
- The Bennies
- Blank Pages
- British Sea Power
- Britta Phillips
- The Brunettes
- The Bunnies
- Casey Mecija (Ohbijou)
- Cassettes Won't Listen
- Caulfield Sisters
- Alex McAulay (Charles Douglas)
- Cindy Wheeler
- The Commons
- The Coctails
- Dala
- Darcie Miner
- David Miller
- Dean & Britta
- Descartes a Kant
- Devics
- Dipsomaniacs
- The Douglas Fir
- The Dresden Dolls
- Dylan in the Movies
- Elizabeth Harper
- Elk City
- Eric Drew Feldman
- Euro-Trash Girl
- Fashion Victims
- Fiona Lehn
- Francine
- Frank Black
- The German Art Students
- Grand Duchy
- Heidi Gluck
- Jenny Owen Youngs
- Jill Sobule
- Joe Harvard Band
- John Doe
- John P. Strohm
- Josie Cotton
- Joy Zipper
- The Karma Parade
- Kate York
- Kitty Hawk
- Kitty Karlyle
- Kristin Hersh
- Laura Gibson
- Le Tetsuo
- The Leisure Society
- Lori McKenna
- The Lovable Rouges
- Luff
- Matthew Sweet
- Melissa Gibbs
- The Modifiers
- Mogwai
- Morning Theft
- Neil Halstead
- Nova Social
- The Nuevos
- O+S
- OK Go
- PC Munoz
- Papercuts
- Peter Broderick
- The Poems
- The Real Tuesday Weld
- The Rest
- Rizzo
- The Rosebuds
- Say Hi
- The Smarties
- Snowbird
- Stars
- Steve Rizzo
- The Submarines
- Tanya Donelly
- Tara King
- Telekinesis
- They Might Be Giants
- Trespassers William
- Underdog
- The Wading Girl
- The Watson Twins
- The Wedding Present
- The Wheelers
- Witch Hats
- Wondernaut

== Discography ==
This list is organized by catalog number, a roughly chronological number system established by the label and typically printed on or assigned to each official release.

Cat. No.	Title	Artist	Year	Notes
ALR-0001	Transistor	Various (The Atomic Hep Cats, The Lovable Rogues, The Modifiers, AM, and The Bennies)	2004	
ALR-0010	High School Reunion; A Tribute to Those Great 80's Films!	Various ( John P. Strohm, Matthew Sweet, The Dresden Dolls, Caulfield Sisters, etc.)	2005	
ALR-0002	Say It With Fire	Caulfield Sisters	2005	
ALR-0006	"Divine Candy"	Caulfield Sisters / Julie Peel	2006	
ALR-0007	"So Long City Skies"	John P. Strohm / Dylan in the Movies	2007	
ALR-0008	"Heart of Gold"	Tanya Donelly / Luff	2007	
ALR-0011	Dig for Fire – A Tribute to Pixies	Various (John P. Strohm, OK Go, Dylan in the Movies, They Might Be Giants, Mogwai, Morning Theft, The Rosebuds, Joy Zipper, etc.)	2007	3 editions - Limited Edition 1st Pressing (21 songs), Bonus 3-Song Vinyl, LP (15 songs)
ALR-0012	Cinnamon Girl; Women Artists Cover Neil Young For Charity	Various (Tanya Donelly, Britta Phillips, Lori McKenna, Veruca Salt, Dala, etc.)	2008	
ALR-0013	Gigantic - a Tribute to Kim Deal	Various (Rizzo, Francine, Witch Hats, Descartes A Kant, etc.)	2008	
ALR-0015	Songs for Film & TV	Various (Veruca Salt, Dresden Dolls, They Might Be Giants, John P. Strohm, etc.)	2008	
ALR-0016	"Everybody Hurts" / "Imagine"	Elk City / Steve Rizzo	2008	
ALR-0018	Just Like Heaven - A Tribute to The Cure	Various (Joy Zipper, Dean and Britta, Elk City, The Rosebuds, etc.)	2009	
ALR-0019	Near the Sun	Julie Peel	2009	
ALR-0022	"Josephine If You Only Knew"	Dylan in the Movies	2010	
ALR-0023	Sing Me to Sleep – Indie Lullabies	Various (The Leisure Society, Casey Mcija, The Coctails, Say Hi, etc.)	2010	Three editions - limited 1st pressing (21 songs), bonus 3-song vinyl, LP (14 songs)
ALR-0024	"Girl with the Black Tights"	Dylan in the Movies	2010	Feat. Tanya Donelly
ALR-0025	"Two Songs from Mohawk"	Caulfield Sisters		2011
ALR-0027	Please Please Please: A Tribute To The Smiths	Various (Elk City, Greg Laswell, Cinerama, Stars, etc.)	2011	
ALR-0028	A Tribute to Repo Man	Various (The Tellers, Matthew Sweet, etc.)	2012	
ALR-0032	I Saved Latin! A Tribute to Wes Anderson	Various	2014	
ALR-0035	Whatever, My Love	The Juliana Hatfield Three	2015	
ALR-0035	Juliana Hatfield Sings Olivia Newton-John	Juliana Hatfield	2018	
ALR-0046	Weird	Juliana Hatfield	2019	
"—" denotes unassigned catalog numbers. Sources: ALR-Music/aboutus
