= Live from Nowhere, Volume 1 =

Live from Nowhere, Volume One

Live album by Over the Rhine
- Released: 2006
- Recorded: December 11, 2004 & December 17, 2005.
- Genre: Americana
- Length: 60:47
- Label: none

Over the Rhine chronology
Drunkard's Prayer (2005)	Live from Nowhere, Volume One (2006)	Snow Angels (2006)

Live from Nowhere, Volume 1 is a live album by Over the Rhine, released in 2006, containing highlights from the band's 2004 and 2005 annual Christmas tours. The CD was limited to 3,000 copies and comes in a fold-out digipak. After the CD pressing had sold out, the band made the album available digitally through various online retailers. This is the first of a series of limited-edition annual live releases; Live From Nowhere, Volume 2 followed in 2007, Live From Nowhere, Volume 3 came in 2008, and Live From Nowhere, Volume 4 was released in 2009.

Initially planned as a souvenir of the 2005 Taft Theatre concert, technical problems with the 2005 recording resulted in the disc becoming a compilation of songs from the 2004 show at the venue, and two unspecified performances from 2005, showcasing the band just prior to the release of Drunkard's Prayer as well as towards the end of that album's subsequent tour.

== Track listing ==
1. Faithfully Dangerous* (6:12)
2. Spark (4:42)
3. Born (6:20)
4. Lookin' Forward (4:09)
5. Drunkard's Prayer (4:10)
6. White Horse (4:25)
7. Etcetera Whatever (6:03)
8. Fever* (3:42)
9. Son of a Preacher Man (3:20)
10. Moondance* (5:16)
11. My Love Is a Fever* (5:14)
12. It's Only a Paper Moon* (4:36) (listed as "Paper Moon" on the packaging)

Tracks marked (*) recorded at the Taft Theatre, December 11, 2004. Other tracks recorded at an unspecified location(s) in 2005.

== Notes ==
- The album contains a hidden track, a solo piano version of "There Is Power In The Blood," recorded at St. Elizabeth's Cathedral, Cincinnati, December 18, 2005.

== Personnel ==
=== 2004 recording ===
- Karin Bergquist – voice, acoustic guitar, piano
- Linford Detweiler – piano
- Byron House – upright bass
- Devon Ashley – drums

=== 2005 recording ===
- Karin Bergquist – voice, acoustic guitar, piano
- Linford Detweiler – piano
- Kim Taylor – acoustic guitar, vocals
- Rick Plant – bass, electric guitar
- Devon Ashley – drums, backing vocals on "Son of a Preacher Man"
