= Riverbend Music Center =

Outdoor amphitheater

Coordinates: 39.052105°N 84.418721°W

- J. Ralph Corbett Pavilion
- Interactive map of Riverbend Music Center
- Address: 6295 Kellogg Ave; Cincinnati, OH 45230-7118
- Owner: Music and Event Management, Inc.
- Operator: Music and Event Management, Inc.
- Capacity: 20,500

Construction
- Groundbreaking: June 2, 1983
- Opened: July 4, 1984
- Renovated: 1999, 2009
- Cost: $9 million ($29.1 million in 2025 dollars)
- Architect: Michael Graves

Tenants
- Cincinnati Symphony Orchestra (1984–present); Cincinnati Pops Orchestra (1984–present)

Website
- Venue Website

Riverbend Music Center is an outdoor amphitheater located in Cincinnati, Ohio, along the banks of the Ohio River. It has a capacity of 20,500 (6,000 reserved pavilion seats and 14,500 general admission lawn) and was built for the Cincinnati Symphony Orchestra, to allow them to play in an outdoor venue during the summer months. Its location is directly adjacent to Belterra Park as well as the lot of the former Coney Island water park. Famed architect and 2012 Driehaus Prize winner Michael Graves designed the building. The venue is owned by the Cincinnati Symphony Orchestra, booked and operated by its subsidiary, Music and Event Management Incorporated (MEMI) and also partners with Live Nation.

== Venues ==
=== Riverbend Music Center ===
When Riverbend opened in 1984, it was one of only 16 outdoor music amphitheaters in the United States and it helped revive the Cincinnati concert scene. Many concert promoters avoided Cincinnati following the December 3, 1979, Who rock concert tragedy, in which 11 people died at Riverfront Coliseum. The city passed tough crowd control ordinances, which kept major acts away. Despite those factors, promoters gave the venue a chance and the fans were excited to see acts who had been avoiding the city since 1979.

Riverbend was built for $9 million on 15 acres (61,000 m^{2}) of land donated by Coney Island, a small amusement park. The land was once the site of 2 popular rollercoasters, The Wildcat and Shooting Star, the latter was demolished in 1971. Due to its location next to the Ohio River, parts of the venue can become flooded, canceling shows. A Pearl Jam concert in 2003 and a 2001 show by Oasis and The Black Crowes were among the shows canceled.

The venue's first performance was by Erich Kunzel & The Cincinnati Pops Orchestra, with special guests Ella Fitzgerald and Neil Armstrong, on July 4, 1984. The British group the Spice Girls played a show, during the North American leg of their Spiceworld Tour, on July 18, 1998. On July 4, 2000, The Pops performed the first live concert televised from Cincinnati, which aired on PBS, featuring Rosemary Clooney and Doc Severinsen. The Dave Matthews Band performed and recorded their show, on June 26, 2000, which was later released as a live album, entitled Live Trax Vol. 16. Sting performed during his Symphonicities Tour on July 20, 2010, along with the Royal Philharmonic Orchestra.

The Grateful Dead played two shows at Riverbend, the first on June 24, 1985 and the second on June 30, 1986 - the first of these was released as one of the shows on the box set 30 Trips Around The Sun.

The amphitheatre has also played host to music festivals, including Crüe Fest, Crüe Fest 2, Curiosa, Lilith Fair, Lollapalooza, the Mayhem Festival, Ozzfest, Projekt Revolution, The Horde Festival and the Vans Warped Tour.

==== Jimmy Buffett at Riverbend ====
Gulf and western singer-songwriter Jimmy Buffett played at Riverbend every year from 1988 to 2022. As of his 2008 appearance, he had performed for 41 consecutive sell-out crowds. There are only two other venues at which he played more shows (Comcast Center and Merriweather Post Pavilion). His following in Cincinnati started at Kings Island's Timberwolf Amphitheater, where the term "Parrotheads" was coined. Every year after, his concerts sold out in minutes, and was one of the toughest tickets to get in Cincinnati. Because of the sellouts, he played two shows in 1989. As shows continued to sell out, Buffett was one of a few performers who played multiple nights at Riverbend. He played two shows in 1989 and 1990, three in 1991, four in 1992, and a five-night stint in 1993. He continued to play multiple nights through 2000. During the summer of 2001, fans in Cincinnati were disappointed when only one show was played. Even though the shows continued to sell out in record breaking time, he only played one show each year from 2001 to 2022. Buffett died in 2023.

During his two-night stay at Riverbend in 1990, he recorded live songs for the album Feeding Frenzy.

=== PNC Pavilion ===
PNC Pavilion
- Interactive map of PNC Pavilion
- Full name: PNC Pavilion at Riverbend
- Former names: Riverbend Pavilion (planning/construction); National City Pavilion (2008)
- Owner: Music and Event Management, Inc.
- Operator: Music and Event Management, Inc.
- Capacity: 4,100

Construction
- Groundbreaking: May 2007
- Opened: May 24, 2008
- Cost: $6.8 million ($10.6 million in 2025 dollars)
- Architect: GBBN Architects
- General contractor: Messer Construction

Riverbend has built an additional 4,100 seat pavilion, The PNC Pavilion, adjacent to the current box office. The pavilion opened on May 24, 2008 with Cincinnati's Over the Rhine. The band performed their entire Ohio album on the venue's opening night. In January 2009 National City Pavilion became PNC Pavilion due to PNC's purchase of National City bank.

== See also ==
- List of contemporary amphitheatres
