= Heidi Gluck =

Canadian-American musician

Heidi Lynne Gluck
- Born: Winnipeg, Manitoba, Canada
- Genres: folk, rock, indie
- Occupation: Musician
- Instruments: Vocals, keyboards, piano, guitar, bass, harmonica, accordion, lap steel, melodica, drums, percussion
- Years active: 1999–present
- Labels: Lotuspool Records, Koch Records, Benchmark Records, Glurp American Laundromat, Mariel Recording Company
- Website: http://heidilynnegluck.com

Heidi Lynne Gluck is a Canadian-American singer-songwriter, based in Lawrence, Kansas. She is also a multi-instrumentalist solo artist, band member, producer, and studio musician. Gluck has released two solo LPs, "Migrate or Die" (2023), "Pony Show" (2016) and one EP, "The Only Girl in the Room" (2015), as well as contributing to many other recordings. She has also been a member of several bands, including Margot & the Nuclear So and So's, The Roseline, The Pieces, The Only Children, 95 Sweetbird, and Some Girls. She has appeared on recordings for numerous other artists, including Simrit, Lily & Madeleine, Carrie Newcomer, Gentleman Caller, and Tom Brosseau.

== Discography ==
Year	Album title	Artist	Instruments Played
2026	Perspective	The Swallowtails	Producer, bass, keys
2025	Alluvium and other North Dakota Folk Songs	Tom Brosseau	Producer, songwriter, bass, drums, keys, guitar, vocals
2025	Paper Gowns	Jeremy Climer	bass, keys, guitar, vocals, songwriter
2024	Keystone of the Heart	The Roseline	Vocals, piano, organ
2023	Sunflower/Under African Skies	Tom Brosseau & Heidi Gluck	Vocals, bass
2023	Migrate or Die	Heidi Lynne Gluck	Songwriter, producer, vocals, keys, bass, guitar, lap steel, engineer
2022	Hot Dice/Saber Rattlers	The Roseline	Vocals, piano, organ
2021	Blue Fire	Guru Shabad Singh	Vocals, keys, bass, guitar, lap steel
2021	Constancy	The Roseline	Vocals, piano, organ
2021	Stealing the Tapes	Hidden Pictures	Vocals, bass
2020	Around The Bend	Brent Windler	Vocals
2020	Some Kind of Holiday	Michael Golden	Vocals, keys, bass, guitar, lap steel
2020	Good/Grief	The Roseline	Vocals
2019	Mountain of Smoke	Livtar Singh	Vocals, keys, bass, guitar, lap steel
2018	In Cocoon	No Magic	Vocals, bass, lap steel
2017	Blood	The Roseline	Vocals
2016	Pony Show	Heidi Lynne Gluck	Songwriter, bass, guitars, vocals, keys, lap steel, piano, accordion, drums, engineer
2016	Princess Jesus Presents Hitchcocking	Gentleman Caller	Vocals
2017	Memento Mori	Matt Pryor	Piano, vocals, slide guitar, accordion, engineer
2016	Songs of Resilience	Simrit	Bass, guitar, piano
2015	The Only Girl In The Room	Heidi Lynne Gluck	Songwriter, bass, guitars, vocals, keys, lap steel, piano, accordion, drums, engineer
2015	Superhero	David England	Bass, vocals, keys, piano, guitar
2015	Downtown In The Dark	Gentleman Caller	Bass, vocals, keys, piano, slide guitar
2015	From The Ancient Storm	Simrit	Bass, vocals, keys, piano
2014	Fumes	Lily & Madeleine	Bass, keys, piano, guitar, songwriter
2014	Slingshot To Heaven	Margot & the Nuclear So and Sos	Bass, vocals, keys, piano, melodica
2014	Simrit	Simrit	Bass, vocals, keys, piano, guitar
2014	Permeable Life	Carrie Newcomer	Bass, vocals, keys, lap steel, piano, accordion
2013	Strange Stains	Berwanger	Bass, vocals, lap steel
2013	Lily & Madeleine	Lily & Madeleine	Bass, vocals, lap steel, piano, keys
2012	Rot Gut, Domestic	Margot & the Nuclear So and Sos	Vocals
2012	Locked Doors & Pretty Fences	Joel Henderson	Bass, vocals, piano
2008	Cinnamon Girl (Neil Young Tribute)	Various Artists	Bass, vocals, guitar, keys, piano
2007	Keeper Of Youth	The Only Children	Bass, vocals, keys, piano
2007	Limbeck	Limbeck	Vocals
2006	Musical Family Tree: Delicious Berries	Various Artists	Bass, guitar, vocals, keys, songwriter
2006	Crushing Love	Some Girls	Bass, guitar, vocals, keys, piano, songwriter
2004	Change Of Living	The Only Children	Vocals, accordion
2004	In The Garden	Courtney Kaiser	Bass, vocals
2003	Feel It	Some Girls	Bass, vocals, keys, piano, harmonica
2003	The Pieces	The Pieces	Bass, vocals, keys, piano, songwriter
2002	Baby's Breadth	June Panic	Keys, lap steel, piano, vocals
2002	Music For Picnics	Sophia Travis	Bass, vocals, lap steel
2002	EP Series: PI, I2, E3, C4, E5, S6	The Pieces	Vocals, bass, keys, guitar, lap steel.
