= The Darkest Night of the Year =

Studio album by Over the Rhine
- Released: December 9, 1996
- Studios: Sound Images (Cincinnati, Ohio); Mersey Beat; The Third Story Bedroom
- Genre: Rock/pop
- Length: 44:17
- Label: Independent
- Producers: Linford Detweiler, Ric Hordinski

Over the Rhine chronology
Good Dog, Bad Dog (1996)	The Darkest Night of the Year (1996)	Besides (1997)

Professional ratings
Review scores
Source	Rating
Allmusic	4/5 stars
Phantom Tollbooth	(favorable)

The Darkest Night of the Year is a Christmas album by the group Over the Rhine, released independently in 1996. It is their fifth studio album overall, and the last to feature the band's original lineup.

The album features six interpretations of traditional Christmas songs, three original instrumentals, three vocal compositions, and a second version of "Silent Night" featuring Terri Templeton, who was touring with Over The Rhine as a secondary vocalist at the time. Ten years later, Over The Rhine would release a second Christmas album, Snow Angels with a greater emphasis on original compositions.

This album is notable for being the first Over The Rhine album not to feature the photography of Michael Wilson. The cover illustration is by David Sheldon. Additionally, this is the only full-length OTR album to feature bassist Chris Dahlgren, who began touring with the band in 1996 to accommodate Linford Detweiler's move to keyboards.

== Track listing ==
1. "The First Noel" (arranged: Detweiler and Dahlgren) - 3:47
2. "Silent Night" (arranged: Bergquist and Hordinski) - 3:43
3. "It Came Upon a Midnight Clear" (arranged: Detweiler) - 2:50
4. "Greensleeves" (arranged: Detweiler and Dahlgren) - 2:49
5. "O Little Town of Bethlehem" (arranged: Detweiler) - 3:00
6. "Coal Train" (music: Hordinski) -!2:43
7. "Thank You My Angel" (words and music: Detweiler, MacDonald, Powell) - 4:12
8. "Mary's Waltz" (words and music: Detweiler) - 3:59
9. "Up North Here Where the Stars... 1945" (music: Detweiler) - 1:53
10. "Silent Night (duet)" (arranged: Detweiler) - 3:11
11. "O Come, O Come Emmanuel" (arranged: Detweiler and Dahlgren) - 2:02
12. "Amelia's Last" (words and music: Detweiler) - 2:49
13. "A Little Lower Than the Angels" (music: Hordinski) - 7:10
- The two versions of "Silent Night" are performed in different styles: the first being a full-band electric recording similar to the sound of Eve, while the second is a slower, acoustic reading featuring Norm Johns' upright bass.
- "A Little Lower Than the Angels" takes its title from a lyric of Good Dog, Bad Dog's "All I Need Is Everything"; however the songs are not related musically.

== Personnel ==
Over the Rhine

- Karin Bergquist – vocals
- Linford Detweiler – upright piano, harmonium, acoustic guitars, electric bass
- Ric Hordinski – guitars, Ebow
- Chris Dahlgren – acoustic bass
- Brian Kelley – drums

Additional personnel

- Norm Johns – cello
- Terri Templeton – additional vocals on "Silent Night (duet)"

=== Production ===
- Todd Kearby – executive production assistancr
- Linford Detweiler – producer (1–5, 8–12), recording (1, 3, 4, 5, 8, 10, 11), mixing (1, 3–5, 8, 10, 11), vocal and bass recording (2), final mix (2)
- Ric Hordinski – producer (2, 6, 13), guitar and drum recording (2), recording (6, 13), mixing (6, 13)
- Dale Smith – recording (9, 12), mixing (9, 12)
- Steve Harris – technical assistant (2)
- Mark Hood – digital editing, mastering
- Grey Larsen – digital editing, mastering
- Owen Brock – design, art production
- David Sheldon – illustration
