= Amateur Shortwave Radio =

Live album by Over the Rhine
- Released: April 1999
- Recorded: 1990–1999
- Genre: Americana
- Length: 58:43
- Label: Grey Ghost Records

Over the Rhine chronology
| Besides (1997) | Amateur Shortwave Radio (1999) | Films For Radio (2001) |

Professional ratings
Review scores
| Source | Rating |
|---|---|
| Phantom Tollbooth | 4/5 stars |

Amateur Shortwave Radio is a live album by Over the Rhine, released in 1999, compiled by Linford Detweiler to mark the 10th anniversary of the band's first recordings in 1989.

== Track listing ==
1. Like A Radio - 8:55

- Recorded at the Emery Theatre, Cincinnati, Ohio, December 1995.

2. Ruby Tuesday - 4:35

- Produced by Ric and Linford, April 1999.

3. Mary’s Waltz - 4:16

- Recorded at Devou Park, Covington, Kentucky with the Northern Kentucky Symphony, September 1997.
- Northern Kentucky Symphony conducted by James R. Cassidy. Orchestration by Terry LaBolt.

4. Blackbird - 4:44

- Recorded for Nightwaves, WVXU, November 1990.

5. Moth - 5:06

- Recorded at Echo Park, May 1998.

6. Jack’s Valentine - 5:45

- Recorded for live broadcast on Audiosyncracies, WVXU, July 1997.

7. Circle of Quiet - 7:45

- Recorded at Canal Street Tavern, Dayton, Ohio, March 1999.

8. Anyway - 4:47

- Recorded at Echo Park, May 1998.

9. My Love is A Fever - 5:00

- Recorded at the State Theatre, Portland, Maine, September 1994.

10. I Will Remember - 7:27

- Recorded at Echo Park, May 1998.

== Personnel ==
- Karin Bergquist - Voice, Acoustic Guitar, Piano
- Linford Detweiler - Bass, keyboards, spoken word
- Ric Hordinski - Electric guitar, e-bow
- Brian Kelley - drums, harmony vocal
- Jack Henderson - electric guitar
- Terri Templeton - harmony vocal
- Mike Georgin - bass
