= Snow Angels (album) =

Studio album by Over the Rhine
- Released: December 2006
- Studios: Nowhere Farm and Alex The Great Studios (Nashville, Tennessee); Echo Park Studios (Bloomington, Indiana)
- Genre: Americana
- Label: Great Speckled Dog
- Producers: Over the Rhine, Brad Jones

Over the Rhine chronology
Live from Nowhere, Volume 1 (2006)	Snow Angels (2006)	Discount Fireworks (2007)

Professional ratings
Review scores
Source	Rating
Phantom Tollbooth	favorable

Snow Angels is the ninth studio album, and second Christmas album, by Over the Rhine, released independently in 2006. The album was released by Great Speckled Dog on October 2, 2007.

Snow Angels was released ten years after the group's first Christmas disc, 1996's The Darkest Night of the Year. While Darkest Night was largely composed of interpretations of traditional Christmas songs, Snow Angels was almost entirely original material. The only non-original track in the album is a lounge-inspired take on "Jingle Bells" that debuted during the 2004 Christmas tour.

== Track listing ==
1. "All I Ever Get for Christmas Is Blue" (Bergquist, Detweiler) - 4:24
2. "Darlin' (Christmas is Coming)" (Detweiler) - 3:33
3. "White Horse" (Detweiler) - 4:14
4. "Little Town" (Traditional; Additional words and music: Detweiler) - 3:22
5. "New Redemption Song" (Detweiler) - 2:25
6. "Goodbye Charles" (Detweiler) - 2:17
7. "Snowed In With You" (Bergquist, Detweiler) - 5:07
8. "North Pole Man" (Bergquist, Detweiler) - 3:07
9. "Here It Is" (Detweiler) - 3:24
10. "One Olive Jingle" (Traditional; Arrangement: Bergquist, Detweiler) - 3:55
11. "Snow Angel" (Detweiler) - 4:28
12. "We're Gonna Pull Through" (Bergquist, Detweiler) - 2:47

== Personnel ==
Over the Rhine

- Karin Bergquist – vocals
- Linford Detweiler – acoustic piano (1–3, 5–7, 9–12), acoustic guitars (2–5, 8, 9, 12), backing vocals (2, 4), accordion (3), Hammond organ (4, 5, 9), bells (9)

Additional musicians

- Brad Jones – Lowrey organ (2), bass (2, 5, 9), mandolin (3), electric guitars (5, 9), acoustic guitars (9)
- Byron House – double bass (1, 4, 6–8, 10)
- Mickey Grimm – percussion (1, 2, 9, 10), drums (3–7, 9, 10)
- Fats Kaplin – violin (7)
- David Henry – cello (11, 12)

=== Production ===
- Over the Rhine – producers, additional photography
- Brad Jones – producer, recording, mixing (6)
- Pete Hicks – recording
- Paul Mahern – recording, mixing (1–5, 7–11)
- Kevin Loyal – additional recording, mixing (12)
- Roger Seibel – mastering at SAE Mastering (Phoenix, Arizona)
- Owen Brock – design
- Michael Wilson – photography
- Clinton Reno – illustration

== Notes ==
- "Goodbye Charles" is a piano instrumental inspired by Vince Guaraldi's compositions from A Charlie Brown Christmas
- "Darlin' (Christmas Is Coming)" was performed live as far back as the 2001 Christmas tour as a straight mid-tempo folk/pop song. The Snow Angels recording was drastically re-arranged into a swing-style arrangement and performed this way on the 2006 tour.
- "White Horse" was written and first performed in 2004; a live version appears on Live From Nowhere, Volume 1.
- "All I Ever Get for Christmas Is Blue" was first performed live on the 2001 Christmas tour, and was regularly performed on each subsequent Christmas tour.
- The title "North Pole Man" was inspired by a drawing by Polly Wilson, age 7, called "North Pole Man Holding a Map Looking for a Warm Place".
- The front cover illustration is by Clinton Reno, who had worked with Over The Rhine previously in designing a tour poster commemorating their 2006 tour with Hem.
