= Make It Stop =

Make It Stop may refer to:

- Make It Stop (album), a 1991 album by Zero Boys
- "Make It Stop" (Andor), a 2025 television episode of the Disney+ streaming series Andor

== See also ==
- "Make It Stop (September's Children)", a 2011 song by Rise Against
