= Brent Gallaher =

American jazz saxophonist and composer (born 1969)

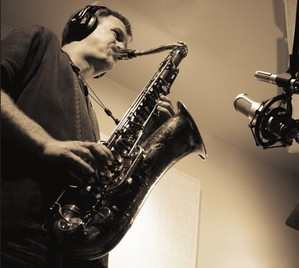
- Gallaher recording the Lightwave project.

Background information
- Birth name: Brent Christopher Gallaher
- Born: May 13, 1969; Cumberland, Maryland, U.S.
- Genres: Jazz
- Occupation(s): Musician composer, bandleader, teacher
- Instrument(s): Tenor saxophone, soprano saxophone, alto saxophone, flute, clarinet
- Years active: 1980–present
- Labels: V&B
- Website: www.brentgallaher.com

Brent Christopher Gallaher (born May 13, 1969, in Cumberland, Maryland) is an American jazz saxophonist and composer.

== Early life ==
He is the son of Linda (Swearingen) Gallaher and Christopher S. Gallaher. His father was a professor of music at Frostburg State University. The Gallaher family moved to Morehead, Kentucky, in 1972 when his father was hired by Morehead State University. He spent his childhood in the small college town.

The son of a musician, Gallaher began studying music at an early age. At the age of six, he began studying piano and throughout elementary school, he acted and sang in the university's musical theater productions. He began studying saxophone at age eleven, studying with David Anderson.

Gallaher was a quick and dedicated study and was playing professionally by age sixteen. Anderson, Professor of Jazz and Studio Music at Morehead State, gave him the opportunity to play tenor saxophone with the college's top jazz ensemble. He played with MSU for two years and while with them was recruited by trumpeter Pat Harbison to study at the University of Cincinnati – College-Conservatory of Music. He visited the school and accepted a scholarship to study jazz.

== Career ==
In the fall of 1988, Gallaher moved to Cincinnati, Ohio and began his studies with Rick VanMatre and Pat Harbison at the CCM. He thrived in this creative environment, surrounded by other gifted musicians. He also had many opportunities to play with local and nationally known musicians. Some of the names include Cal Collins, Kenny Poole, Steve Schmidt, Art Gore, Wilbert Longmire, The Blue Wisp Big Band and the Psychoacoustic Orchestra.

After three years at the CCM, he was offered a position on the Glenn Miller Orchestra. He toured with the ensemble from 1991 to 1992 and can be heard on their album Here We Go Again (1992). He returned to Cincinnati and the CCM in 1992 and in 1994 completed his Bachelors in Jazz Performance. While at the CCM he was featured was on their album Carnival of Life (Alissa, 1994). After graduating, he continued freelancing in and around the Cincinnati area.

In November 1998, Gallaher was called to tour with the Tommy Dorsey Orchestra under the direction of Buddy Morrow. He was with the Dorsey band for under a year. He returned to Dorsey in 2000 and was with them for an additional seven months.

Gallaher has since been working as a freelance musician and has performed with the Blue Wisp Big Band, Cohesion Jazz Ensemble, Cal Collins, the Phil DeGreg Trio, the Ron Enyard Trio, Wilbert Longmire, Ed Moss Society Jazz Orchestra, the Vintage Keys Project and the Psychoacoustic Orchestra. The Cohesion Jazz Ensemble and The Psychoacoustic Orchestra are featured on J-Curve’s Cincinnati Jazz Collection Vol. 1 (1998) with Gallaher as a member. He also recorded with the Psychoacoustic Orchestra on Blackstone's Hidden Treasures—Cincinnati's Tribute to King Records' Legacy (2003).

In August 2003, Brent completed the recording of his first album, Vanessa's Song, and it was released in March 2004. This album features Jim Connerley on piano, Jim Anderson on bass and Tony Franklin on drums. He recorded with Over the Rhine, in the fall of 2004, on their album Drunkard's Prayer. He can also be heard on The Jazz Circle’s debut album Joshua, which was released in March 2006.

March 2010 marked the release of his second recording project titled Lightwave. This features the talents of Dan Karlsberg on piano, Steve Whipple on bass and Anthony Lee on drums.

Gallaher can be heard with a variety of groups including the Dan Karlsberg Nati 6, the Cincinnati Contemporary Jazz Orchestra, the Pete Wagner Band, the Blue Wisp Big Band, the Art Gore Quartet, and the Cincinnati Pops Orchestra.

== Teaching ==
Brent Gallaher has been teaching saxophone, improvisation and piano since the early 1990s. He has a private studio of students ranging from elementary school to postgraduate students. He worked as an instructor at the University of Cincinnati – College-Conservatory of Music and was a member of their faculty Jazztet from 2010–2013. Brent is an adjunct faculty member in the Jazz Department of the University of Dayton (Ohio).

== Discography ==
=== As leader ===
- Vanessa's Song (V&B, 2003)
- Lightwave (V&B, 2010)
- Moving Forward (V&B, 2016)

=== As sideman ===
- Here We Go Again by Glenn Miller Orchestra (1992)
- Carnival of Life by Cincinnati College Conservatory of Music Jazz Ensemble and Combo (1994)
- For the Love of It by Deborah Locke (1997)
- Cincinnati Jazz Collection Vol. 1 by Various artists (1998)
- Hidden Treasures—Cincinnati's Tribute to King Records' Legacy by Various artists (2003)
- Drunkard's Prayer by Over the Rhine (2004)
- Kentucky Symphony Orchestra Salutes Frank Sinatra, an American Icon by Kentucky Symphony Orchestra (2005)
- Joshua by The Jazz Circle (2006)
- After 5 by The CCM Faculty Jazztet (2013)
- One for Four by New Third Stream Quartet (2014) – Composer on "Pure"
- Second Springtime by Larry Dickson (2015)
- Moon and Shadow by John Zappa (2015)
- Nati 6 by Dan Karlsberg (2015)
