= Till We Have Faces (disambiguation) =

Till We Have Faces is a 1956 novel by C. S. Lewis.

Till We Have Faces may also refer to:

- Till We Have Faces (Gary Thomas album), 1992
- Till We Have Faces (Over the Rhine album), 1991
- Till We Have Faces (Steve Hackett album), 1984
- Till We Have Faces, a 2002 album by Noise Ratchet

== See also ==
- Until We Have Faces, a 2011 album by Red
