= Drunkard's Prayer =

Studio album by Over the Rhine
- Released: March 29, 2005
- Recorded: November 2004 at The Grey Ghost, Norwood, Ohio.
- Genre: Americana
- Length: 50:51
- Label: Back Porch Records
- Producer: Linford Detweiler, Karin Bergquist and Mahan Kalpa.

Over the Rhine chronology
Changes Come (2004)	Drunkard's Prayer (2005)	Live From Nowhere, Volume 1 (2006)

Professional ratings
Review scores
Source	Rating
Allmusic	4/5 stars
Phantom Tollbooth	4/5 stars

Drunkard's Prayer is the eighth studio album by Over the Rhine, released in 2005. It is a concept album telling the story of band members Linford Detweiler and Karin Bergquist's marriage, near-divorce and reconciliation.

== Track listing ==
All songs written by Karin Bergquist and Linford Detweiler, except My Funny Valentine, written by Richard Rodgers and Lorenz Hart.

1. "I Want You To Be My Love" - 4:09
2. "Born" - 6:13
3. "Drunkard's Prayer" - 4:10
4. "Bluer" - 3:45
5. "Spark" - 4:13
6. "Hush Now (Stella's Tarantella)" - 3:22
7. "Lookin' Forward" - 3:15
8. "Little Did I Know" - 6:55
9. "Who Will Guard The Door" - 5:06
10. "Firefly" - 5:22
11. "My Funny Valentine" - 4:16

== Personnel ==
Over the Rhine

- Karin Bergquist – vocals, acoustic guitars (1, 5, 7, 9), acoustic piano (3, 10), percussion (10)
- Linford Detweiler – acoustic piano (1, 2, 6, 8, 11), acoustic guitars (2, 4, 5, 7, 9), backing vocals (4), Wurlitzer organ (5), bass (5, 10), percussion (5, 10)

Additional personnel

- Pete Hicks – electric guitars (2, 10)
- Byron House – upright bass (1, 3, 4, 8, 11)
- Devon Ashley – drums (5, 7, 8)
- Brent Gallaher – saxophone (3, 8)
- David Henry – cello (3, 5, 7, 10)

=== Production ===
- Karin Bergquist – producer, additional photography
- Linford Detweiler – producer, recording
- Mahan Kalpa – producer, recording, mixing
- Pete Hicks – recording
- Roger Seibel – mastering at SAE Mastering (Phoenix, Arizona)
- Owen Brock – design
- Michael Wilson – photography
- Anne Dickens – liner notes
