= Changes Come =

Live album by Over the Rhine
- Released: 2004
- Recorded: October 19, 2003.
- Genre: Americana
- Length: 73:59

Over the Rhine chronology
Ohio (2003)	Changes Come (2004)	Drunkard's Prayer (2005)

Professional ratings
Review scores
Source	Rating
Phantom Tollbooth	4.5/5 stars

Changes Come is a live album by Over the Rhine, released in 2004, documenting their 2003 tour in support of Ohio.

== Track listing ==
All songs written by Karin Bergquist and Linford Detweiler, except Ain't No Sunshine, written by Bill Withers. "Lifelong Sunshine" is a medley of "Lifelong Fling" and "Ain't No Sunshine."

1. "Spinning
2. "Show Me
3. "She
4. "Nobody Number One
5. "Suitcase
6. "Lifelong Sunshine
7. "Ohio
8. "All I Need Is Everything
9. "The World Can Wait
10. "When I Go
11. "B.P.D.
12. "Cruel and Pretty
13. "Changes Come

== Notes ==
- All tracks were recorded at 12th and Porter, Nashville, TN, October 19, 2003.
- The album omits two songs: "Bothered" and "Long Lost Brother," but otherwise follows the original setlist of the show.

== Personnel ==
- Karin Bergquist - Voice, Acoustic Guitar, Piano
- Linford Detweiler - Piano, Organ, Wurli
- Paul Moak - Acoustic and Electric Guitars, Pedal Steel, Sitar, Backing Vocals
- Rick Plant - Bass
- Will Sayler - Drums
