= Discount Fireworks =

Compilation album by Over the Rhine
- Released: February 6, 2007
- Genre: Americana
- Length: 71:19
- Label: Back Porch Records
- Producer: various

Over the Rhine chronology
Snow Angels (2006)	Discount Fireworks (2007)	Live From Nowhere, Volume 2 (2007)

Professional ratings
Review scores
Source	Rating
Allmusic	4/5 stars

Discount Fireworks is the first compilation by Over the Rhine, released in 2007. It was the band's final release for Back Porch Records, the label for which they had been recording since 2000.

The album contains 14 previously released songs and a 2006 recording of "Last Night On Earth Again," an unreleased song from the Ohio sessions.

== Track listing ==
1. "Last Night on Earth Again" (Detweiler) – 3:35
2. "If Nothing Else" (Detweiler) – 4:57
3. "Suitcase" (Bergquist, Detweiler) – 3:27
4. "Give Me Strength" (Armstrong, Gabriel, Statham) – 4:15
5. "Latter Days" (Detweiler) – 5:42
6. "The World Can Wait" (Bergquist, Detweiler) – 5:46
7. "Show Me" (Bergquist, Detweiler) – 4:21
8. "Born" (Bergquist, Detweiler) – 6:15
9. "All I Need Is Everything" (Bergquist, Detweiler) – 5:-4
10. "Ohio" (Bergquist) – 5:14
11. "Sleep Baby Jane" (Detweiler, Hordinski) – 5:01
12. "How Does It Feel? (To Be on My Mind)" (Detweiler, Hordinski) – 3:56
13. "Lookin’ Forward" (Bergquist, Detweiler) – 4:11
14. "Within Without" (Detweiler, Hordinski) – 4:28
15. "Like a Radio" (Detweiler, Hordinski) – 5:04

== Personnel ==
- Evan Adler – product manager
- Devon Ashley – drums
- Michael Aukafor – dulcimer
- Mike Bailey – A&R
- Karin Bergquist – piano, vocals, producer
- Owen Brock – design
- Linford Detweiler – acoustic guitar, bass, guitar, keyboards, organ (hammond), producer, liner notes, drum loop, loop, cello arrangement, tack piano
- Pascal Gabriel – keyboards, programming, loop
- Mickey Grimm – percussion, drums
- Don Heffington – percussion, drums
- Jack Henderson – guitar, electric guitar, lap steel guitar
- Peter Hicks – electric guitar
- Ric Hordinski – guitar, mandolin, producer
- Byron House – bass
- Norman Johns – cello
- Brad Jones – acoustic guitar, bass, electric guitar, producer
- Brian Kelley – percussion, drums
- Paul Mahern – producer
- Mickey Paoletta – pedal steel, slide guitar
- Dave Perkins – guitar, producer
- Rick Plant – electric guitar
- Vess Ruhtenberg – electric guitar
- Will Sayles – percussion, drums
- Kim Taylor – acoustic guitar, harmony
- Jason Wilbur – electric guitar
- Michael "Mick" Wilson – photography
