= Blue Wisp Jazz Club =

Blue Wisp Jazz Club was a Cincinnati institution and internationally known venue.

Established in 1977 by Paul Wisby in O'Bryonville as a bar, the Blue Wisp quickly became well known for its jazz music. Marjean Wisby continued the club's tradition after her husband's death in 1984, later moving the club to the basement space at 19 Garfield Place, to a location on East 8th street as of in 2002, and to 700 Race St. in 2012. The venue hosted the best local, national and international jazz for Cincinnati, and from the late 1970s to the early 2000s was considered the premier jazz venue in Cincinnati. The famous Blue Wisp neon sign was a signature of the venue. The marquee was once much larger and displayed the acts until city ordinance demanded the size be reduced.

Marjean Wisby died of respiratory failure in 2006, leaving behind debts the estate could not pay. The club was sold and the new owners were not able to maintain the venue's appeal or its concept. After a failed attempt at rebranding it as a restaurant, blues and jazz club, they closed the doors for good in June 2014.

The Blue Wisp Big Band is the last vestige of the club. They continue the legacy started at the little club in O'Bryonville at Caffè Vivace in Walnut Hills every Wednesday night.
