= Patience (Over the Rhine album) =

Studio album by Over the Rhine
- Released: July, 1992 (Scampering Songs), June 29, 1993 (I.R.S. re-release)
- Genre: Rock
- Length: 42:51
- Label: Scampering Songs/I.R.S. Records
- Producer: Linford Detweiler

Over the Rhine chronology
Till We Have Faces (1991)	Patience (1992)	Eve (1994)

Professional ratings
Review scores
Source	Rating
Allmusic	4/5 stars

Patience is Over the Rhine's second studio album, released independently in 1992, and re-released in 1993 as the band's first release on I.R.S. Records.

== Track listing ==
=== Scampering Songs release (1992) ===
1. Jacksie
2. I've Been Slipping
3. How Does It Feel (To Be On My Mind)
4. HDIF (Reprise)
5. Sister
6. Il Est Dans Mon Poche
7. Flanders Fields
8. Little Genius
9. Lullabye
10. Circle Of Quiet
11. I Painted My Name
12. Rhapsodie
13. Grey Monologue

=== I.R.S. release (1993) ===
1. Jacksie (4:36)
2. I've Been Slipping (4:55)
3. Circle Of Quiet (4:14)
4. How Does It Feel (To Be On My Mind) (3:54)
5. HDIF (reprise) (2:10)
6. Sister (4:29)
7. Il Est Dans Mon Poche (2:34)
8. Flanders Fields (1:31)
9. Little Genius (1:53)
10. Lullabye (2:07)
11. I Painted My Name (5:00)
12. Rhapsodie (3:19)
13. Grey Monologue (1:25)

== Personnel ==
- Karin Bergquist - vocals and acoustic guitar
- Ric Hordinski - electric and acoustic guitars
- Brian Kelley - drums and percussion
- Linford Detweiler - bass and keyboards

=== Additional personnel ===
- John Catchings - cello
