= Ohio (Over the Rhine album) =

Studio album by Over the Rhine
- Released: August 19, 2003
- Recorded: February 2003 to April 2003
- Studios: Echo Park (Bloomington, Indiana). Additional recording at The Grey Ghost.
- Genre: Americana
- Length: 93:37
- Label: Back Porch Records
- Producers: Linford Detweiler, Karin Bergquist and Mahan Kalpa.

Over the Rhine chronology
| The Cutting Room Floor (2002) | Ohio (2003) | Changes Come (2004) |

Professional ratings
Review scores
| Source | Rating |
|---|---|
| Allmusic | 4.5/5 stars |
| Phantom Tollbooth | 4.5/5 stars |
| PopMatters | (favorable) |

Ohio is a 2003 double studio album by the Ohio-based folk music band Over the Rhine. The group's seventh album overall, it was released as both a double CD and limited edition double vinyl LP set.

A rerecorded version of a song from these sessions, "Last Night On Earth Again", was released on the Discount Fireworks compilation.

== Track listing ==
All songs written by Karin Bergquist and/or Linford Detweiler.

=== Disc one ===
1. "B.P.D." - 4:31
2. "What I'll Remember Most" (Detweiler) – 4:28
3. "Show Me" – 4:20
4. "Jesus In New Orleans" - 5:45
5. "Ohio" (Bergquist) - 5:13
6. "Suitcase" - 3:25
7. "Anything At All" (Bergquist) - 3:36
8. "Professional Daydreamer" - 4:30
9. "Lifelong Fling" - 5:45
10. "Changes Come" - 5:31

=== Disc two ===
1. "Long Lost Brother" (Detweiler) - 4:41
2. "She" - 4:32
3. "Nobody Number One" - 4:15
4. "Cruel And Pretty" (Detweiler) - 4:16
5. "Remind Us" (Bergquist) - 3:05
6. "How Long Have You Been Stoned" - 3:40
7. "When You Say Love" - 2:45
8. "Fool" - 4:04
9. "Hometown Boy" (Bergquist) - 3:56
10. "Bothered" - 5:07
11. "Idea #21 (Not Too Late)" (unlisted track) - 3:41

== Personnel ==
Over the Rhine

- Karin Bergquist – vocals, acoustic piano, acoustic guitar, percussion
- Linford Detweiler – acoustic piano, Wurlitzer electric piano, organ, Mellotron, Minimoog, acoustic guitars, electric guitars, bass

Additional personnel

- Paul Mahern – Minimoog, percussion
- Tony Paoletta – slide acoustic guitar, dobro, pedal steel guitar
- Vess Ruhtenberg – electric guitars, hand clap arrangements
- Jason Wilbur – electric guitars
- Jake Smith – bass
- Devon Ashley – drums, percussion
- Will Sayles – drums, percussion
- Megan Weeder – violin
- Tyron Cooper – backing vocals, choir arrangements
- Natasha Evans and Stephanie Parker – choir

=== Production ===
- Karin Bergquist – producer
- Linford Detweiler – producer, additional recording
- Paul Mahern (Mahan Kalpa) – producer, recording, mixing
- Jake Belser – additional recording
- Nate Halverson – technical support
- Kevin Loyal – technical support
- Mike Stucker – technical support
- Owen Brock – design
- Michael Wilson – photography
