= Good Dog, Bad Dog =

Good Dog, Bad Dog: The Home Recordings

Studio album by Over the Rhine
- Released: June 30, 1996
- Genre: Americana
- Length: 60:08
- Label: Virgin Records/Back Porch Records (re-release)
- Producers: Linford Detweiler, Ric Hordinski

Over the Rhine chronology
Eve (1994)	Good Dog, Bad Dog: The Home Recordings (1996)	Besides (1997)

Virgin Re-Release Cover

Professional ratings
Review scores
Source	Rating
Allmusic	4/5 stars

Good Dog, Bad Dog is the fourth studio album by Over the Rhine. It was released independently in 1996 and reissued with a slightly altered track listing by Virgin/Backporch in 2000.

While no singles were issued from the album, according the band's official site, several of the songs on Good Dog, Bad Dog appeared in various prime time television shows and independent films, including 2000's Love & Sex, co-starring Jon Favreau and Famke Janssen. "All I Need Is Everything" was performed on CBS This Morning and included on a Starbucks/Hear Music compilation. References to the band were also included in "Alpha," a Season 6 episode of The X-Files, which featured a dog-expert named Karin Bergquist and an evil Dr. Detweiler whose character is killed in the closing minutes.

== Track listing ==
=== 1996 independent release ===
1. "Latter Days" - 5:34
2. "All I Need Is Everything" - 4:54
3. "Etcetera Whatever" - 4:52
4. "I Will Not Eat The Darkness" - 1:59
5. "Faithfully Dangerous" - 4:51
6. "The Seahorse" - 4:55
7. "Everyman's Daughter" - 4:10
8. "A Gospel Number" - 4:31
9. "Poughkeepsie" - 4:54
10. "Willoughby" - 3:32
11. "Jack's Valentine" - 4:37
12. "Happy To Be So" - 4:45
13. "Go Down Easy" - 5:20

=== 2000 Virgin/Back Porch re-release ===
1. "Latter Days" - 5:34
2. "All I Need Is Everything" - 4:54
3. "Etcetera Whatever" - 4:52
4. "I Will Not Eat The Darkness" - 1:59
5. "Faithfully Dangerous" - 4:51
6. "The Seahorse" - 4:55
7. "Everyman's Daughter" - 4:10
8. "Poughkeepsie" - 4:54
9. "Willoughby" - 3:32
10. "It's Never Quite What It Seems" - 4:06
11. "Happy To Be So" - 4:45
12. "Go Down Easy" - 5:20

=== 2008 Over The Rhine/Great Speckled Dog re-release ===
1. "Latter Days" - 5:34
2. "All I Need Is Everything" - 4:54
3. "Etcetera Whatever" - 4:52
4. "I Will Not Eat The Darkness" - 1:59
5. "Faithfully Dangerous" - 4:51
6. "The Seahorse" - 4:55
7. "Everyman's Daughter" - 4:10
8. "A Gospel Number" - 4:31
9. "Poughkeepsie" - 4:54
10. "Willoughby" - 3:32
11. "Jack's Valentine" - 4:37
12. "Happy To Be So" - 4:45
13. "Go Down Easy" - 5:20
14. "It's Never Quite What It Seems" - 4:06

== Personnel ==
- Karin Bergquist – vocals, acoustic guitars, 12-string guitar
- Linford Detweiler – upright piano, keyboards, organ, acoustic guitars, bass, cello arrangements
- Ric Hordinski – Mellotron, electric guitars, acoustic guitars, lap steel guitar, Ebow
- Brian Kelley – drums, percussion

Additional musicians

- Norman Johns – cello

=== Production ===
- Linford Detweiler – producer, design, liner notes
- Ric Hordinski – co-producer
- Mark Hood – mastering
- Grey Larsen – mastering
- Owen Brock – art direction, design
- Michael Wilson – photography

== Miscellaneous ==
- According to the Q & A section of Ric's website, Good Dog, Bad Dog is his favorite Over The Rhine record.
