= Canterbury Girls =

Studio album by Lily & Madeleine
- Released: February 22, 2019
- Recorded: Nashville, Tennessee, US
- Length: 37:20
- Label: New West
- Producer: Daniel Tashian; Ian Fitchuk

Lily & Madeleine chronology
Keep It Together (2016)	Canterbury Girls (2019)

Singles from Canterbury Girls
- 1. "Self Care" Released: November 29, 2018; 2. "Analog Love" Released: January 25, 2019; 3. "Just Do It" Released: May 24, 2019

Professional ratings
Aggregate scores
Source	Rating
Metacritic	80/100
Review scores
Source	Rating
AllMusic	4/5 stars
Pop Magazine	5/5 stars
Slant Magazine	3/5 stars

Canterbury Girls is the fourth studio album by American duo Lily & Madeleine. It was released on February 22, 2019 through New West Records.

== Critical reception ==
Canterbury Girls received generally favorable reviews according to Metacritic, with a score of 80/100 based on four reviews.

=== Accolades ===
Accolades for Canterbury Girls
Publication	List	Work	Ranking	Ref
Pop Magazine	Best Albums of 2019	Canterbury Girls	4	

Canterbury Girls was nominated for the Album of the Year Award at the Pop Awards 2020.

== Track listing ==
Canterbury Girls track listing
No.	Title	Length
1.	"Self Care"	2:56
2.	"Supernatural Sadness"	3:30
3.	"Just Do It"	3:20
4.	"Canterbury Girls"	3:57
5.	"Bruises"	3:41
6.	"Pachinko Song"	4:12
7.	"Circles"	4:15
8.	"Can't Help the Way I Feel"	3:13
9.	"Analog Love"	3:53
10.	"Go"	4:23
Total length:		37:20

== Charts ==
Chart performance for Canterbury Girls
Chart (2019)	Peak position
UK Independent Albums (OCC)	42
US Heatseekers Albums (Billboard)	8
US Independent Albums (Billboard)	29
