= Blue Wisp Big Band =

Blue Wisp Big Band was founded in 1980 by drummer John Von Ohlen and trumpeter Don Johnson. The band took its name from the Blue Wisp Jazz Club.

== History ==
Von Ohlen, a native of Indianapolis, moved to the Cincinnati area after many years on the road playing with Stan Kenton and Woody Herman. This inspired to start a big band.

Johnson, who had been on the Cincinnati scene for years, suggested which instrumentalists should play in the band. Pianist Steve Schmidt and bassist Michael Sharfe were already playing with Von Ohlen at the Blue Wisp in the Steve Schmidt Trio.

The band started recording in 1981, releasing an album sponsored by the Cincinnati television station WKRC, then four for the Mopro label founded by Fred and Helen Morr in the 1980s. Sea Breeze reissued the Mopro albums in the 1990s. Among the group's more notable members were trumpeter Tim Hagans and bassist Lynn Seaton.

== Personnel ==
=== Saxophones ===
- Mike Andres
- Jeremy Long
- Herb Aronoff
- Brent Gallaher
- Larry Dickson

=== Trumpets ===
- Jeff Folkens
- Kevin Moore
- Hank Mautner
- Kim Pensyl

=== Trombones ===
- Jeff Owen
- Clarence Pawn
- Scott Forney
- Gary Langhorst (bass trombone)

=== Rhythm section ===
- Steve Schmidt, piano
- Mike Sharfe, bass
- Jim Leslie, drums

=== Former members ===
Jim Sherrick, saxophone; Joe Gaudio, saxophone; Mike Campbell, saxophone; Steve Hoskins, saxophone; Eddie Morgan, trombone; Paul Piller, trombone; Scott Acree, trombone; Kirk Shields, trombone; Bill Gemmer, trombone; Jim Pelz, trombone; Dominic Marino, trombone; Rick Savage, trumpet; Tim Hagans, trumpet; Don Johnson, trumpet; Larry Wiseman, trumpet; Brad Dunn, trumpet; Al Kiger, trumpet; Al Nori, trumpet; Jerry Conrad, trumpet; Lynn Seaton, bass; John Von Ohlen, drums

== Discography ==
=== Albums ===
- The Blue Wisp Big Band of Cincinnati (WKRC-TV Records, 1981)
- Butterfly (Mopro, 1982)
- The Smooth One (Mopro, 1983)
- Live at Carmelo's (Mopro, 1984)
- Rollin' with Von Ohlen (Mopro, 1985)
- 20th Anniversary (Sea Breeze, 2001)
- A Night at the Wisp (Sea Breeze, 2003)
- Tribute (Sea Breeze, 2007)
