= The Trumpet Child =

Studio album by Over the Rhine
- Released: August 21, 2007
- Studio: Alex The Great Studios and Nowhere Farm (Nashville, Tennessee).
- Genre: Americana
- Length: 41:56
- Label: Great Speckled Dog
- Producer: Brad Jones

Over the Rhine chronology
Live from Nowhere, Volume 2 (2007)	The Trumpet Child (2007)	Live from Nowhere, Volume 3 (2008)

Professional ratings
Review scores
Source	Rating
Allmusic	3.5/5 stars

The Trumpet Child is the tenth studio album by Over the Rhine, released in 2007. In addition to the CD, the album was also released on 180-gram vinyl.

== Track listing ==
1. "I Don’t Wanna Waste Your Time" (Detweiler) - 4:01
2. "Trouble" (Bergquist) - 4:00
3. I’m on a Roll (Bergquist/Detweiler) (3:18)
4. "Nothing Is Innocent" (Bergquist/Detweiler) - 3:52
5. '"The Trumpet Child" (Detweiler) - 3:45
6. "Entertaining Thoughts" (Bergquist) - 3:08
7. "Who’m I Kiddin’ But Me" (Bergquist) - 3:28
8. "Let’s Spend the Day in Bed" (Bergquist/Detweiler) - 5:47
9. "Desperate for Love" (Detweiler) - 3:05
10. "Don’t Wait for Tom" (Detweiler) - 4:19
11. "If a Song Could Be President" (Detweiler) - 3:09

== Personnel ==
Over the Rhine

- Karin Bergquist – voice, acoustic guitar (2)
- Linford Detweiler – acoustic piano (1, 2, 5, 8, 9), acoustic guitars (3, 4, 6, 8, 11), vibraphone (3), Wurlitzer electric piano (7, 8), Rhodes piano (8), Hammond organ (8, 11), tack piano (10), harmony vocals (11)

Additional musicians

- Tony Paoletta – slide guitar (3), pedal steel guitar (4, 10, 11)
- Rick Plant – slide guitar (6)
- Matt Slocum – electric guitars (8)
- Brad Jones – upright bass (1–4), bass harmonica (2), percussion (2), Chamberlin (4, 11) organ (6), harmonium (6), electric guitars (6, 8), bass (6–8, 10, 11), slide guitar (7)
- Byron House – upright bass (5)
- Mickey Grimm – drums (1–4, 7, 11), percussion (2, 3, 7, 10)
- Devon Ashley – drums (2, 3), percussion (3)
- Lindsay Jamieson – drums (6, 8, 10), percussion (6, 8)
- Jim Hoke – saxophones (1, 5), alto flute (4), vibraphone (4), clarinet (9), bass clarinet (10)
- Neil Rosengarden – valve trombone (1), trumpet (1, 5), muted trumpet (5)
- David Henry – cello (2)
- Chris Carmichael – violin (4, 8), cello (8, 9), viola (8)

=== Production ===
- Brad Jones – producer, recording, mixing
- Pete Hicks – recording
- Roger Seibel – mastering at SAE Mastering (Phoenix, Arizona)
- Amy Seiffert – design, illustration
- Rob Seiffert – design, illustration
- Michael Wilson – photography
- Linford Detweiler – liner notes
- Glen Phillips – management

== Notes ==
- The front cover illustration and package design was done by Perrysburg, Ohio-based Madhouse, marking the first non-Christmas, non-compilation album not to feature a Michael Wilson photograph on the cover. However, Wilson's work does appear in the CD booklet.
- The lyrics to "Don't Wait For Tom" contain several references to Tom Waits songs, including "Swordfish Trombones," "Ol' 55," and "Make It Rain."
