= Films for Radio =

Films For Radio

Studio album by Over the Rhine
- Released: March 13, 2001
- Studios: The Grey Ghost and Bulldog Farm (Cincinnati, Ohio); Dave's Existential Waco Bus, East Iris Studios and The Carport (Nashville, Tennessee); Echo Park Studios (Bloomington, Indiana); The Strongroom (East London, UK)
- Genre: Americana
- Length: 57:07
- Label: Back Porch Records
- Producers: Linford Detweiler, Karin Bergquist and Dave Perkins.

Over the Rhine chronology
Amateur Shortwave Radio (1999)	Films For Radio (2001)	The Cutting Room Floor (2002)

Professional ratings
Review scores
Source	Rating
Allmusic	link
Phantom Tollbooth	link

Films For Radio is the sixth studio album by Over the Rhine, released in 2001.

== Track listing ==
All songs written by Karin Bergquist and Linford Detweiler except where indicated

1. "The World Can Wait" - 5:46
2. "If Nothing Else" (Detweiler) - 4:53
3. "Give Me Strength" (Dido Armstrong, Pascal Gabriel, Paul Statham) - 4:13
4. "Fairpoint Diary" (Detweiler) - 4:35
5. "I Radio Heaven" (Detweiler) - 4:44
6. "Little Blue River/In The Garden" (Bergquist) - 8:13
7. "Goodbye (This Is Not Goodbye) - 5:27
8. "Whatever You Say" - 3:43
9. "The Body Is A Stairway Of Skin" - 4:19
10. "Moth" - 4:37
11. "When I Go" (Bergquist) - 6:25

== Personnel ==
Over the Rhine

- Karin Bergquist – vocals, upright piano (1), acoustic guitar (6, 11)
- Linford Detweiler – Hammond organ (1, 5, 8, 10, 11), drum loops (1, 2), cello arrangements (1), upright piano (2, 4–7, 10), Wurlitzer electric piano (2, 4, 5, 8, 10), acoustic guitars (2, 5, 8), Leslie electric guitar (2, 4), Vox Super Continental organ (4), keyboard flutes (4), toy piano (4), Hofner bass (4), brushed snare loops (4), rainstick (4), keyboards (7), organ (7), string arrangements (7), loops (9)

Additional personnel

- Pascal Gabriel – keyboards (3), programming (3), loops (3)
- Jack Henderson – electric guitars (1, 3, 7, 10), 12-string guitar (2), lap steel guitar (2, 5–7, 9)
- Dave Perkins – EBow guitar (1, 5), "shaft" guitar (2), electric guitars (5)
- Michael Timmins – electric guitars (11)
- Byron House – bass (1, 2, 5–8, 10)
- Don Heffington – drums (1, 2, 4–8, 10), percussion (1, 2, 4, 5, 7, 8, 10)
- Michael Aukafor – hammered dulcimer (2)
- Mickey Raphael – bass harmonica (5)
- Norman Johns – cello (1, 4)
- John Catchings – cello (7)
- Kristin Wilkinson – viola (7)
- David Davidson – violin (7)
- Terri Templeton – harmony vocals (7, 8, 10)

=== Production ===
- Linford Detweiler – producer, recording (1, 2, 4–11), mixing (9), editing (9), mix assistant (10), art direction, liner notes
- Dave Perkins – producer (1, 2, 4–8, 10), recording (1, 2, 4–8, 10), mixing (10)
- Karin Bergquist – producer (3, 11)
- Jack Henderson – electric guitar recording (3)
- Mike Stucker – vocal recording (3), mixing (11), part reassembling
- David Thoener – mixing (1, 2), final mix (3)
- Russ Long – mixing (4–8)
- Mike Stucker – mixing (11)
- Kevin Syzmanski – mix assistant (1–3)
- Trevor Sadler – digital editing (1–3), digital mastering at Mastermind Productions (Milwaukee, Wisconsin)
- Stephen Marcussen – mastering (1–3) at Marcussen Mastering (Hollywood, California)
- Owen Brock – art direction, design
- Michael Wilson – art direction, photography

== Appearances ==
"Give Me Strength" appeared in an episode from Third Watch TV series called "After Hours" (season 2, episode 07).
