= Zero Boys =

American hardcore punk band

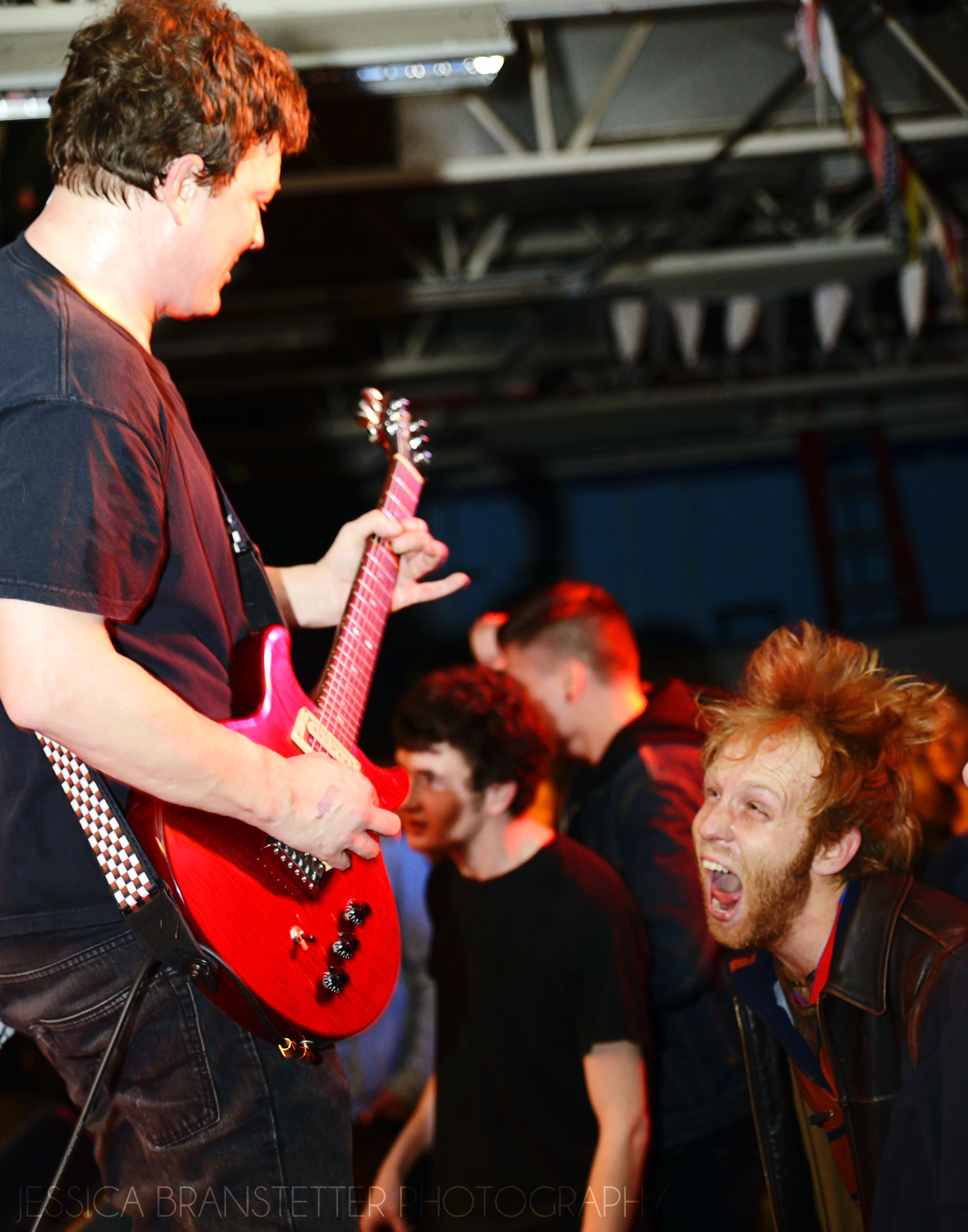
- Dave Lawson playing guitar during a Zero Boys concert in 2014.

Background information
- Origin: Indianapolis, Indiana
- Genres: Punk rock; hardcore punk
- Years active: 1980–1985, 1987–1988, 1991-1994, 2006–present
- Labels: Secretly Canadian, Z-Disc, Panic Button, 1-2-3-4 Go!
- Spinoffs: Datura Seeds
- Members: Paul Mahern – vocals Mark Cutsinger – drums Scott Kellogg – bass Dave Lawson – guitar
- Past members: John Mitchell – bass David "Tufty" Clough – bass Terry "Hollywood" Howe (deceased) – guitar Vess Ruhtenberg – guitar
- Website: zeroboys.com

The Zero Boys are an American hardcore punk quartet from Indianapolis, Indiana fronted by Paul Mahern that debuted in 1980. Other current members include bassist Scott Kellogg, drummer Mark Cutsinger and guitarist Dave Lawson. The band was known as one of the few popular hardcore bands from the Midwest, as the scene was mostly dominated by bands from the coasts. Maximum Rocknroll has called their 1982 LP Vicious Circle "one of the best all-time hardcore records."

== History ==
The band formed in June 1980 by Terry "Hollywood" Howe and Mark Cutsinger, who recruited Paul Mahern (only 17 years old at the time) and John Mitchell. Three months later, in September 1980, they released their first record, Livin' in the '80s, a 7-inch EP released by the band on their home-brew Z-Disc label. The same lineup also recorded the song "New Generation," which was included on the 1981 release Red Snerts - The Sound of Gulcher, the first compilation LP of Indiana punk and new wave bands.

In June 1981, Tufty Clough replaced Mitchell on bass, forming what is considered the classic band lineup. That November the group recorded their first album, Vicious Circle, which was released in 1982 by the local label Nimrod Records. The album's distinctive bright yellow cover features a heavily stylized face drawn by Kurt Davis (aka "Yukki Gype," then drummer for Anderson, IN punk band The Repellents).

The album received a positive review in the first issue of Maximum Rocknroll, with Jeff Bale praising it as a "well-recorded album" that "manage[s] to combine elements from the ’60s punk-Stooges axis...and ’80s thrash without losing anything in the process." In later years, critic Mark Deming noted that while the earlier recordings were "entertaining but standard-issue punk," Vicious Circle featured "furiously tight, light-speed" songs by a band "capable of raining down fire in the studio."

A winter 1981 tour included dates in Boston and New York City, but was considered "relatively unsuccessful" by the band, but shows in Chicago, Milwaukee, and elsewhere (often opening for prominent bands like Subhumans, Flipper, TSOL, and The Effigies) helped to build their reputation.

In 1982, three newly recorded songs by the band were included on The Master Tape, a compilation LP of punk and hardcore bands mainly from the midwest. The following year, two additional new tracks appeared on the expanded, 2-LP follow up compilation, The Master Tape Vol. 2 (1983).

In 1982, the Zero Boys embarked on a nationwide "Hell Tour," which included a notable appearance at The Barn in Torrance, CA, on a bill with Dead Kennedys, MDC, and Minor Threat.

Following the tour, the Zero Boys managed to record a handful of tracks for a planned second LP, to be titled Payback is Hell. But before the album could be finished, the band broke up in early 1983 due largely to strains resulting from the 1982 tour. These tracks were later released, along with the above-mentioned compilation tracks and other demo tracks and outtakes, on the 1984 History Of cassette on Affirmation, a label founded by Mahern.

The Zero Boys reunited for a one-off show on December 30, 1984, at Cosmo's Pizza in Indianapolis. A VHS video recording of this show was eventually released on DVD in 2006. This was the final show by the classic lineup.

Vicious Circle was reissued on Toxic Shock in 1987, with added bonus tracks taken from the Master Tape, Master Tape Vol. 2, and History Of compilations. The positive response to this reissue led to the band reuniting in 1988, but with guitarist Vess Ruhtenberg (previously in JOT and United States Three) replacing Terry Howe, who had moved to Florida. This line up toured extensively (including in Europe), and ultimately recorded two albums: Make It Stop (Bitzcore, 1991) and The Heimlich Maneuver (Skyclad, 1993). In 1994, the band entered a long hiatus lasting over a decade.

Vicious Circle was reissued again in 2000 by Lookout! Records, without the Master Tape and History Of tracks, but with two additional unused songs from the original album sessions, "She Said Goodbye" and "Slam and Worm", which had been given limited release on a 7-inch single issued by Cosmos Pizza Records.

In December 2000, founding guitarist Terry Howe died of a drug overdose.

In 2006, the Zero Boys began reuniting for occasional gigs and tours, including appearing as part of a series of shows at CBGB designed to raise money to help keep the club open, and a series of shows where they performed the entire Vicious Circle album.

In 2009, Secretly Canadian reissued both Vicious Circle and History Of, making the latter available on CD for the first time.

In 2012, Vess Ruhtenberg and Tufty left the band just before a European tour. Scott Kellogg (bass) and Dave Lawson (guitar) are their replacements. In February 2013 the new band released an EP titled Pro Dirt, their first new release in 20 years.

The 2013 EP Hollywood was recorded in tribute to Terry Howe, featuring five songs written by him that had never been recorded. As Mahern noted in a statement at the time of release, "Terry left behind many songs. A few months ago we decided to look through his catalog and record some of them. This Zero Boys release celebrates the life of a good friend and a true unsung guitar hero."

An album of new songs, Monkey, was released on May 20, 2014, on CD and LP. Their 2023 single, "Don't Shoot, Can't Breathe" / "Long Way to Go," released on the I-94 Records label, is their last release of new material to date.

In 2025, Secretly Canadian release Payback is Hell, a compilation of tracks from the 1990s albums Make It Stop and The Heimlich Maneuver, plus two previously unreleased songs. All of the songs were newly remixed by Mahern, with no new overdubs except a backing vocal on "Make It," one of the previously unreleased songs.

Paul Mahern went on to form the garage-psych band Dandelion Abortion (1983–1985), the power pop band the Datura Seeds (circa 1986-early 1990s), and indie rock side project DNA-12 (circa 1998). He has since become a producer in Bloomington, Indiana, where he also teaches yoga and owns the Affirmation Records label. As an adjunct lecturer, Mahern has also taught courses at Indiana University focused on the histories of punk, rock and roll generally, and music production.

== Band members ==
Timeline

== Discography ==
=== Studio albums ===
- Vicious Circle (Toxic Shock/Secretly Canadian/Panic Button/Lookout!/Fundamenta]/Rifleman/Nimrod/P-Vine) (1981)
- Make It Stop (Bitzcore) (1991)
- The Heimlich Maneuver (Skyclad) (1993)
- Monkey (Z-Disk) (2014)

=== Singles and EPs ===
- Livin' In The 80's 7-inch EP (Z-Disk) (1980)
- Split 7-inch EP with Toxic Reasons (Selfless) (1992) - "Black Network News", "Blood's Good"
- "We're Gonna Love" / "U.S.A." (Skyclad) (1993)
- Pro Dirt 7-inch EP (1-2-3-4 Go!) (2013)
- Hollywood 10-inch/CD EP (Z-Disk) (2014)

=== Compilations ===
- History Of (Affirmation) (1984)
- Payback is Hell (Secretly Canadian) (2025)

=== Compilation Appearances ===
- Red Snerts-The Sound Of Gulcher (Gulcher) (1981) - "New Generation'
- The Master Tape (Nimrod/Affirmation) (1982) - "High Places", "Human Body", Mom's Wallet)
- A Drink For Sue Ellen (Schrott) (1983) - "Outta Style", "High Times"
- The Master Tape Vol. 2 2XLP (Affirmation) (1983) - "Black Network News", "I Need Energy"
- Killed By Death #4 (Redrum) (1989) - "Stoned To Death", "Stick To Your Guns", "I'm Bored", "A Piece Of Me"
- Live Treatment cass. (Shotgunning Tape SXXXXX Inc./Discraceland) (1989) - "I'm Bored"
- Parkhof Live Nr. 2 cass. (I Hate Billie Tapes) (1991) - "01-05-88"
- Life Is Too Short For Boring Music Vol. 11 (To Be Continued) (EPA) (1992) - "Indianapolis"
- Faster & Louder - Hardcore Punk Vol. 2 (Rhino Records|Rhino) (1993) - "Civilization's Dying"
- For A Fistful of Yeng! (Bitzcore/Indigo) (1994) - "Indianapolis", "Positive Change"
- Decade Of Disasters (Westworld) (1994) - "Living In The 80's"
- Strange Notes! A Germs Cover Compilation (Bitzcore) (1994) - "What We Do Is Secret"
- So You Wanna Be A Rock'N'Roll Compilation? (Bitzcore) (1995) - "Down The Drain", "Civilization's Dying", "Outta Style"
- Splitter Kompilaischn (Art Beat) (1997)- "Civilization's Dying"
- Dangerously Unstable (Suburban Voice) (1999) - "Positive Change"
- American Revolution Vol. 1-Rare Hardcore Punk From The United States 1978-1984 CDr (Killer Boot) (2000) - "Black Network News"
- Bank Robber Music Compilation Vol. 17-Winter 2008 (Bank Robber Music) (2008) - "Hightime"
- Collectors #2 (Volume) (2009) - "Livin' In The 80's"
- Survive + Music CDr (not on label) (2011) - "New Generation"
- Early Indiana Punk And New Wave (The Crazy Al's Year(s) 1976-1983 (Time Change) - "Commies", "I'm Absent"
- Ox Compilation #114 (Oz Fanzine) (2014) - "Someone To Blame"
- Memorable But Not Honorable Mix Tape Vol. 10 cass. (Memorable But Not Honorable) (2021) - "Livin' In The 80's"

=== Videos ===
- Live At Cosmo's 1984 DVD (Rifleman) (2006)
- Live At The Pizza Castle-1981 DVD (Gnome Park Productions) (2009)
