= The Cutting Room Floor (album) =

Compilation album by Over the Rhine
- Released: 2002
- Genre: Americana
- Length: 56:38
- Label: N/A
- Producer: various

Over the Rhine chronology
Films For Radio (2001)	The Cutting Room Floor (2002)	Ohio (2003)

The Cutting Room Floor is a compilation album of outtakes, demos and live tracks by Over the Rhine, intended as a companion disc to 2001's Films For Radio. The album was released independently and sold only at concerts and on Over The Rhine's website.

== Track listing ==
All songs by Linford Detweiler and Karin Bergquist unless otherwise noted.

1. "Spinning" - 2:48
2. "Toledo" - 4:24
3. "If Nothing Else (Beatbox Mix)" (Detweiler) - 4:55
4. "Toledo (instrumental)" - 4:38
5. "Green-Clouded Swallowtail (Version 1.0)" (Bergquist) - 5:52
6. "I Let It Go" - 5:31
7. "Give Me Strength (acoustic)" (Dido Armstrong, Pascal Gabriel, Paul Statham) - 4:27
8. "I Radio Heaven (original demo)" (Detweiler) - 4:34
9. "Goodbye Strings" (Detweiler) - 0:49
10. "Fairpoint Diary (original demo)" (Detweiler) - 4:46
11. "It's Never Quite What It Seems (Nashville)" - 4:16
12. "Happy And Free" (Bergquist) - 3:48
13. "Helpless (live)" (Neil Young) (live at the Taft Theatre, December 7, 2001) - 5:42

== Personnel ==
- Karin Bergquist - Vocals, Piano, Acoustic Guitar
- Linford Detweiler - Keyboards, harmonium, Hammond B-3, guitars, bass, wurlitzer, piano, harmony vocal on #5

== Additional personnel ==
- Jack Henderson - Electric guitars, lap steel, harmonica
- Byron House - bass
- Don Heffington - drums
- Mickey Raphael - harmonica on #4
- Norm Johns - cello on #8 and #10
- David Davidson (violin), Kristin Wilkinson (viola), John Catchings (cello) - strings on #9
- Tony Paoletta: pedal steel on #11
- Buddy Miller, Julie Miller, Kim Taylor, Erin McKeown - vocals on #13
- Wade Jaynes - bass on #13
- Dale Baker - drums on #13
- Buddy Miller - mando-guitar on #13
