= Love & Revelation =

Studio album by Over the Rhine
- Released: March 15, 2019
- Label: Great Speckled Dog

Over the Rhine chronology
Blood Oranges in the Snow (2014)	Love & Revelation (2019)

Professional ratings
Review scores
Source	Rating
PopMatters	8/10

Love & Revelation is the fifteenth studio album by American duo Over the Rhine. It was released on March 15, 2019 under Great Speckled Dog Records.

== Track listing ==
No.	Title	Length
1.	"Los Lunas"
2.	"Given Road"
3.	"Let You Down"
4.	"Broken Angels"
5.	"Love & Revelation"
6.	"Making Pictures"
7.	"Betting on the Muse"
8.	"Leavin' Days"
9.	"Rocking Chair"
10.	"May God Love You (Like You've Never Been Loved)"
11.	"An American in Belfast"
