= Till We Have Faces (Over the Rhine album) =

Studio album by Over the Rhine
- Released: 1991 (Scampering Songs), August 15, 1995 (I.R.S. re-release)
- Genre: Rock
- Label: Scampering Songs/I.R.S. Records
- Producer: Linford Detweiler, Timothy McAllister

Over the Rhine chronology
Till We Have Faces (1991)	Patience (1992)

Professional ratings
Review scores
Source	Rating
Allmusic	4.5/5 stars

Till We Have Faces is Over the Rhine's debut album, released independently in 1991, and re-released in 1995 on I.R.S. Records.

The re-release substitutes two live recordings for the original studio versions, and adds a bonus track, "Downfall".

== Track listing ==
=== Scampering Songs release (1991) ===
1. Eyes Wide Open
2. Someday
3. Like a Radio
4. Iron Curtain
5. Cast Me Away
6. And Can It Be
7. Gentle Wounds
8. L.A.R. Reprise
9. If I'm Drowning
10. Sea and Sky
11. Fly Dance
12. Paul and Virginia
13. Ubiquitous Hands
14. The Genius of Water

=== I.R.S. release (1995) ===
1. Eyes Wide Open (5:05)
2. Someday (4:34)
3. Like a Radio (5:04)
4. Iron Curtain (2:48)
5. Cast Me Away (0:45)
6. And Can It Be (5:46)
7. Gentle Wounds (4:08)
8. L.A.R. Reprise (1:05)
9. If I'm Drowning (4:59)
10. Sea & Sky (3:21)
11. Fly Dance (live) (6:22)
12. Paul and Virginia (4:06)
13. Ubiquitous Hands (4:10)
14. The Genius of Water (4:13)
15. Radio Coda (live) (5:59)
16. Downfall (2:45)
17. (Untitled hidden track) (2:34)

== Personnel ==
- Karin Bergquist - vocals and acoustic guitar
- Ric Hordinski - electric and acoustic guitars, mandolin
- Brian Kelley - drums and percussion
- Linford Detweiler - bass and keyboards
