= Simrit Kaur =

Simrit
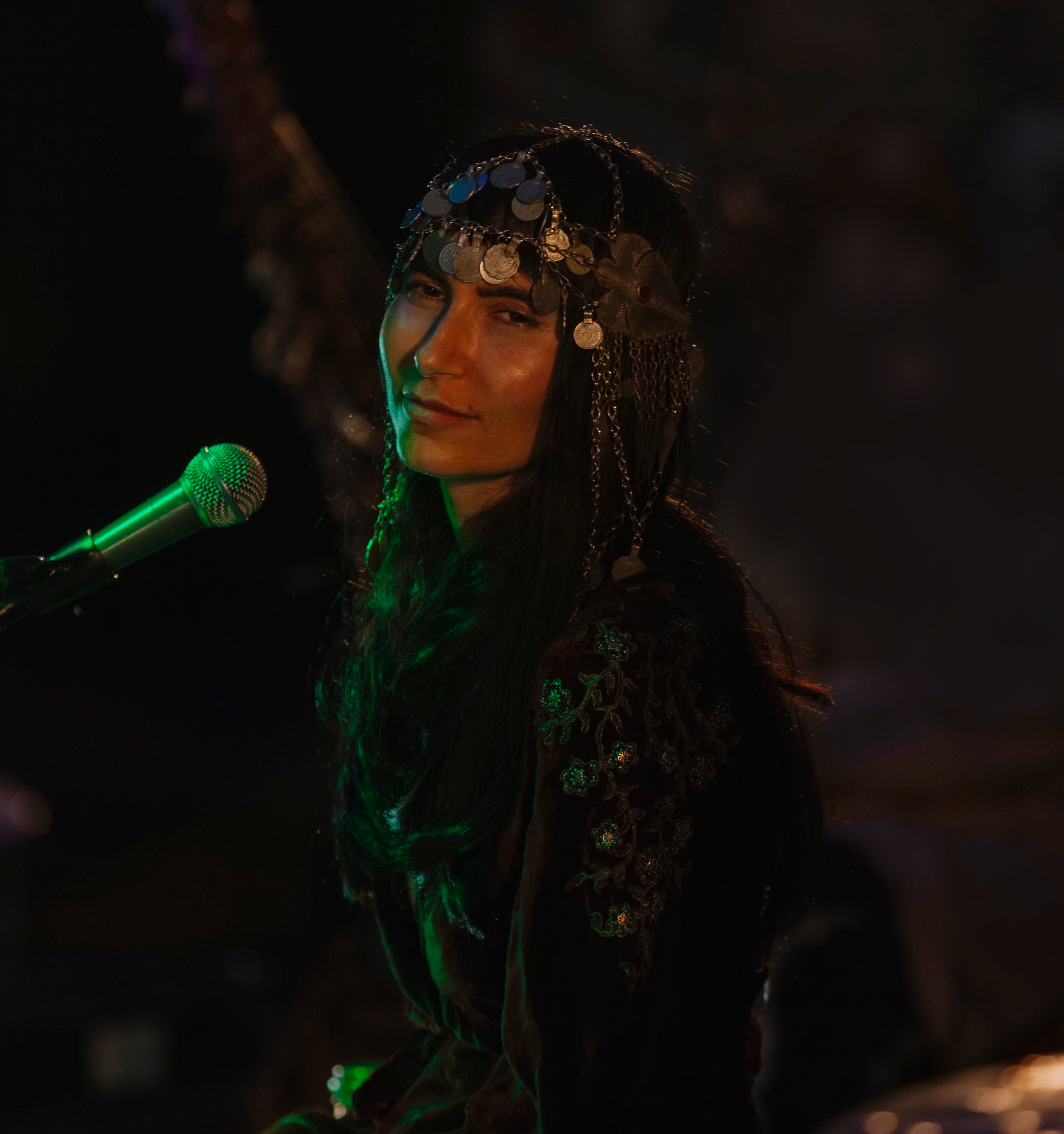

Background information
- Origin: Greece
- Genres: Ethereal Wave; Neo-Psychedelic Worldbeat; World Psych
- Years active: 2010–present
- Labels: Simrit Kaur Music, LLC
- Website: www.simritkaurmusic.com

Simrit Kaur, also known mononymously as Simrit, is a singer/songwriter born in Athens, Greece. She moved to the southeast in the United States as a toddler and currently resides in California.

== Music career (2010–present) ==
Her own independent label, Simrit Kaur Music LLC, released her album The Sweetest Nectar in 2010, which was produced by Simrit with the help of Ram Dass Khalsa and Todd Boston In 2013, Simrit released The Oracle Sessions. Simrit co-produced the album with Anthony Molina of Mercury Rev. In 2014, Simrit released her album titled Simrit, produced by Paul Mahern. Belinda Carlisle is featured on the album track “Kudrat Kavan”. The album reached #2 on iTunes World Chart that year. In 2015, her album From The Ancient Storm was named one of the "10 Best Yoga Albums of the Year" by Yoga Journal and reached #1 on iTunes World Chart as well as reached #3 on Billboard's New Age Chart. Her release, Songs of Resilience (2016), was ranked as #1 on iTunes World Chart and #6 on Billboard's New Age Chart. Her release Live, Spring 2017 reached #1 on iTunes World Music Charts in United States, Australia and United Kingdom and reached #8 on Billboard's New Age Chart. Her release When We Return debuted #1 on the World Music charts on iTunes on December 11, 2019. Her latest release Live in Los Angeles 2019 released on April 25, 2020 and reached #1 on the World Music iTunes chart.

== Discography ==
=== Albums ===
Title	Details
Live in Nevada City 2021	Year: 2022; Label: Simrit Kaur Music, LLC; Format: Digital download
Live in Los Angeles 2019	Year: 2020; Label: Simrit Kaur Music, LLC; Format: Digital download, album
When We Return	Year: 2019; Label: Simrit Kaur Music, LLC; Format: Digital download, album
Live, Spring 2017	Year: 2017; Label: Simrit Kaur Music, LLC; Format: Digital download, album
Songs Of Resilience	Year: 2016; Label: Simrit Kaur Music, LLC; Format: Digital download, album
From the Ancient Storm	Year: 2015; Label: Simrit Kaur Music, LLC; Format: Digital download, album
Simrit (self-titled)	Year: 2014; Label: Simrit Kaur Music, LLC; Format: Digital download, album
The Oracle Sessions	Year: 2013; Label: Simrit Kaur Music, LLC; Format: Digital download, album
The Sweetest Nectar	Year: 2010; Label: Simrit Kaur Music, LLC; Format: Digital download, album

=== Singles ===
Title	Details		
Maha Mrityunjaya	Year: December 22, 2023; Label: Simrit Kaur Music, LLC; Format: Digital Download|-	Interlude	Year: May 31, 2023; Label: Simrit Kaur Music, LLC; Format: Digital Download
Salok	Year: 2021; Label: Simrit Kaur Music, LLC; Format: Digital Download		
Ra Ma Da Sa	Year: 2021; Label: Simrit Kaur Music, LLC; Format: Digital Download		
Air	Year: 2020; Label: Simrit Kaur Music, LLC; Format: Digital Download		
Bhandara Ji	Year: 2020; Label: Simrit Kaur Music, LLC; Format: Digital Download		
We Don't Want	Year: 2020; Label: Simrit Kaur Music, LLC; Format: Digital Download		
Tamizul	Year: 2020; Label: Simrit Kaur Music, LLC; Format: Digital Download		
Some May Say	Year: 2020; Label: Simrit Kaur Music, LLC; Format: Digital Download		
