= Make It Stop (album) =

Studio album by Zero Boys
- Released: December 13, 1991
- Recorded: September 18–20, 1991
- Studios: GALT, Culver, Indiana
- Genre: Punk rock
- Length: 37:52
- Label: Bitzcore

Zero Boys chronology
History Of (1984)	Make It Stop (1991)	The Heimlich Maneuver (1993)

Make It Stop is an album by the Indiana punk band Zero Boys, released in 1991 by the German label Bitzcore. It was the first album Zero Boys recorded after their 1991 reunion, and the first of two recorded with guitarist Vess Ruhtenburg. It was recorded over a 3-day period at GALT Studios in Culver, Indiana.

== Track listing ==
1. "Beach Blanket Boi-Oi-Oi"
2. "Bloods Good"
3. "Godless Girl"
4. "On the Pavement"
5. "Trust Anyone"
6. "You and Your God"
7. "Amerika"
8. "Indianapolis"
9. "Fly Bite"
10. "Parasite Man"
11. "Black Network News"
12. "Open"
13. "Doctors Are Doin' It for Themselves"
14. "Positive Change"
