= Toxic Reasons =

American punk rock band

- Origin: Dayton, Ohio
- Genres: Punk rock, hardcore punk
- Years active: 1979–1995
- Labels: Banit Records, Risky Records, Sixth International Records, Treason Records, T-Reason Records, Funhouse Records, SPV/Hellhound, Lone Wolf Records, Bitzcore
- Past members: Bruce Stuckey; Ed Pittman; Mark Patterson; Joel Agne; Greg Stout; Jimmy Joe "J.J." Pearson; Rob "Snot" Lucjak; David "Tufty" Clough; Terry Howe; Federico "Fefo" Forconi

Toxic Reasons were an American punk rock band, formed in 1979. The band released nine full-length studio albums between 1982 and 1995.

== History ==
Toxic Reasons formed in Dayton, Ohio, in 1979. The founding members were Bruce Stuckey (bass guitar and vocals), Joel Agne (guitar and vocals), Ed Pittman (lead vocals) and Mark Patterson (drums).

In 1980, Agne left the band and was replaced by Greg Stout on bass, while Stuckey switched to lead guitar. In 1981, Patterson left the band and was replaced by James J. "J.J." Pearson on drums. Rob "Snot" Lucjak also joined on rhythm guitar.

They recorded their first studio album, Independence, at Keystone Recording in Indianapolis, Indiana, then went on tour and moved to San Francisco, where their label, Risky Records, was located. David "Tufty" Clough (formerly of Zero Boys) joined the band on bass guitar.

Pittman left the group following the release of Independence. During this time, the band created a logo showing the U.S., Canadian, and British flags joined. The symbol not only represented their tri-national roots (Pearson from Canada, Clough and Lucjak from England, and Stuckey from the U.S.), but also came to symbolize the diversity of their sound, which mixed fast hardcore punk with melodic guitar lines and elements of punk-reggae.

The band's last album, No Peace in Our Time (1995), was the first-ever punk rock CD-ROM released for Mac and Windows. It included short videos, a history of the band's history as told by Stuckey and a karaoke competition with "White Noise". Several songs from No Peace in Our Time appeared in the 1997 feature film The Waiter, directed by G. Allen Johnson.

The band has played occasional reunion gigs such as in 2022 at the Blind Rage Records 2nd anniversary show in Dayton.

== Later projects ==
In 2007, Pearson released a solo album, Only One Reason.

Clough later rejoined the reformed Zero Boys.

Pittman currently plays with the band New Regrets.

== Band members ==
- Bruce Stuckey - guitar, vocals (1979–1995)
- Ed Pittman - lead vocals (1979–1983)
- Mark Patterson - drums (1979–1981)
- Joel Agne - guitar, vocals (1979–1980)
- Greg Stout - bass (1980–1982)
- Jimmy Joe "J.J." Pearson - drums, vocals (1981–1995)
- Rob "Snot" Lucjak - bass, guitar, vocals (1981–1985)
- David "Tufty" Clough - bass, vocals (1982–1995)
- Terry Howe - guitar (1986; died 2000)
- Federico "Fefo" Forconi - guitar (1988–1989)

== Discography ==
=== Studio albums ===
- Independence (1982, Risky Records)
- Kill By Remote Control (1984, Sixth International Records)
- Within These Walls (1985, Treason Records)
- Bullets for You (1986, T-Reason Records)
- Dedication 1979-1988 (1988, SFunhouse Records)
- Anything for Money (1989, SPV/Hellhound) also released on cassette as Fashion for Fascism (1990, Lone Wolf Records)
- In the House of God (1993, Bitzcore)
- No Peace in Our Time (1995, Bitzcore, 1995)

=== Singles and EPs ===
- "War Hero"/"Somebody Help Me" 7-inch single (1980, Banit Records)
- "Ghost Town"/"Killer", "Noise Boys" 7-inch single (1981, Risky Records)
- "God Bless America"/"Can't Get Away", "Destroyer" 7-inch single (1984, T-Reason Records)
- Nobody Tells Us 7-inch EP (1990, Selfless Records)
- Toxic Reasons/ZB split 7-inch EP with Zero Boys (1992, Selfless Records)
- No Pity 7-inch EP (2018, Artcore Fanzine)

=== Live albums ===
- Live Berkeley Square December 1981 (2014, Beer City Records)

=== Compilations ===
- Essential Independence (2015, Beer City Records)
- God Bless America? (2022, Audio Platter)

=== Compilation appearances ===
- Process Of Elimination E.P. (Touch & Go) (1981) - "Riot Squad"
- The Master Tape (Nimrod/Affirmation) (1982) - "Mercenary", "Punk and Disorderly"
- Charred Remains (Noise) (1982) - "Somebody Help Me"
- We Won't Be Your Fucking Poor (Mortarhate) (1985) - "Powercrazed"
- Symphonies For The Disaffected cassette (Beer Belly Tape) (1985) - "Destroyer", "Mercenary"
- We Don't Need Nuclear Force (Mulleimer) (1986) - "God Bless America", "Can't Get Away"
- The Power Of Love-International Hardcore Compilation (Starving Missile) (1986) - "Never Give In", "Party Is Over"
- When The Bow Breaks cassette (Red Glare) (1988) - "Turn The Screw"
- Live Treatment cassette (Shotgunning Tape SXXXXX Inc./Discraceland) (1989) "If The Kids..."
- Children Of The Corn: Compilation Of Indiana Bands (Sonic Iquana) (1990) - "Shut You Down"
- Nothing Lasts (Flex!/Bitzcore) (1991) - "Somebody Help Me"
- Reagan Regime Review (Selfless) (1991) - "Somebody Help Me"
- That's Pop Bix (Pop Bix) (1993) - "Roadkill"
- Bloodstains Across The Midwest (Bloodstains) (1994) - "War Hero"
- For A Fistful Of Yens! (Bitzcore|Indigo) (1994) - "Headfirst", "White Noise"
- Ox-Companion #17-No Way Out (Ox Fanzine) (1994) - "Armageddon Night"
- Cheap Thrills (Bitzcore/Victory Europe/We But) (1994) - "Friends"
- Stange Notes! A Germ Cover Compilation (Bitscore) (1994) - "Not All Right", "Caught My Eye"
- Identity II (Century Media) (1995) - "Armageddon Night"
- So You Wanna Be A Rock 'N' Roll Compilation? (Bitzcore) (1998) - "Mark 13", "Goin' Nowhere", "Break The Bank"
- We Won't Take No More (Mortarhate) (1995) - "Powercrazed"
- Rock The Ripple '95 (Rock The Ripple) (1995) - "Show No Mercy"
- Splitter Kompilaischn #1 (Art Beat) (1997) - "Friends"
- Dance To The Revolution (Mad Butcher/KOB) (1999) "Third World America"
- Best Rare Alternative cassette (Valentine Sound Productions) (1999) - "Goin' Nowhere"
- H.E.A.R. (Sub City) (2000) - "Time"
- Counter Attack (Beer City) (2003) - "Drunk And Disorderly"
- Punk Подвал (Rebel Records Russia) (2004) - "Mercenary"
- Ox Compilation #137 (Ox Fanzine) (2008) - "White Noise"
- Goudvishal (Hectic Recs) (2022) - "God Bless America"
- Punk For Ukraine Vol. #1 2XCD (Grimace) (2022) - "Unholy War"

=== Videos ===
Target Video Presents Live! VHS (1984, Target Video)
