= Eve (Over the Rhine album) =

Studio album by Over the Rhine
- Released: August 23, 1994
- Recorded: April 1994 to June 1994
- Genre: Rock
- Length: 56:25
- Label: I.R.S. Records
- Producer: Over the Rhine

Over the Rhine chronology
| Patience (1991) | Eve (1994) | Good Dog, Bad Dog (1996) |

Professional ratings
Review scores
| Source | Rating |
|---|---|
| AllMusic | 4.5/5 stars |

Eve is Over the Rhine's third studio album, released in 1994, and the band's final release on I.R.S. Records. All songs produced and arranged by Over the Rhine. The album was recorded and mixed by Trina Shoemaker. Tracks 3, 8, 9 and 11 were recorded and mixed by Gene Eugene, listed as Gene Andrusco. Track 6 was recorded by Trina, mixed by Gene.

== Track listing ==
1. "Happy With Myself?" (Karin Bergquist, Linford Detweiler) - 3:44
2. "Within Without" (Bergquist, Detweiler, Ric Hordinski) - 4:27
3. "Should" (Bergquist, Detweiler) - 4:36
4. "Conjectures Of A Guilty Bystander" (Detweiler, Hordinski) - 5:15
5. "Melancholy Room" (Bergquist, Detweiler, Hordinski) - 4:00
6. "Sleep Baby Jane" (Bergquist, Detweiler, Hordinski) - 5:00
7. "Daddy Untwisted" (Bergquist, Detweiler, Hordinski) - 5:09
8. "Birds" (Bergquist, Detweiler) - 3:41
9. "June" (Bergquist, Detweiler) - 5:26
10. "My Love Is A Fever" (Detweiler, Hordinski) - 4:15
11. "Falling (Death Of A Tree)" (Detweiler) - 10:52

== Personnel ==
Over the Rhine

- Karin Bergquist – vocals, acoustic guitar (1)
- Linford Detweiler – keyboard instruments, bass
- Ric Hordinski – acoustic guitars electric guitars, lap steel guitar
- Brian Kelley – drums, percussion

Additional personnel

- Bill Dillon – additional guitars (11.1)
- Chris Dahlgren – upright bass (11.3)

=== Production ===
- Over the Rhine – producers, arrangements
- Trina Shoemaker – recording (1, 2, 4–7, 10, 11.1), mixing (1, 2, 4, 5, 7, 10, 11.1)
- Gene Andrusco – recording (3, 8, 9, 11.3), mixing (3, 6, 8, 9, 11.3)
- Ric Hordinski – additional guitar parts recording (2, 4, 6), mixing (3)
- Fran Flannery – recording assistant
- Greg Calbi – mastering at Masterdisk (New York, NY)
- Owen Brock – design
- Michael Wilson – photography
