= Live from Nowhere, Volume 4 =

Live From Nowhere, Volume Four

Live album by Over the Rhine
- Released: 2009
- Recorded: 2008
- Genre: Americana
- Label: Great Speckled Dog

Over the Rhine chronology
Live From Nowhere, Volume 3 (2008)	Live From Nowhere, Volume Four (2009)	The Long Surrender (2011)

Live From Nowhere, Volume 4 is a live album by Over the Rhine, released in 2009, containing highlights from the band's 2008 shows. The CD is a limited edition and comes in a fold-out digipak.

== Track listing ==
Disc One
No.	Title	Length
1.	"Eyes Wide Open (Live)"	5:42
2.	"How Does It Feel (To Be On My Mind) [Live]"	3:56
3.	"HDIF Reprise (Live)"	2:42
4.	"Within Without (Live)"	4:37
5.	"Like A Radio"	7:36
6.	"Conjectures Of A Guilty Bystander (Live)"	10:48
7.	"June (Live)"	5:39
8.	"Circle Of Quiet (Live)"	4:02
9.	"Daddy Untwisted (Live)"	6:13

Disc Two
No.	Title	Length
1.	"Paul And Virginia (Live)"	5:14
2.	"Poughkeepsie (Live)"	5:44
3.	"Faithfully Dangerous (Live)"	5:20
4.	"A Gospel Number (Live)"	4:48
5.	"All I Need Is Everything (Live)"	5:02
6.	"If I’m Drowning (Live)"	10:48
7.	"I Painted My Name (Live)"	7:03
8.	"Latter Days (Live)"	5:39

This album was recorded during a two night stand at one of their "hometown " venues and features a reunion of the original lineup.

== Personnel ==
- Linford Detweiler: Bass, Keyboards
- Karin Bergquist: Vocals, Acoustic Guitar, Electric Guitar, Keyboards
- Kim Taylor: Backing Vocals
- Julie Lee: Backing Vocals
- Brian Kelley: Drums, Vocals
- Ric Hordinski: Electric Guitar

== Credits ==
- Paul Mahern: Mixing
- Roger Seibel: Mastering
- Owen Brock: Design
- Clinton Reno & Rob Seiffert: Artwork [Tour Posters]
- Michael Wilson: Photography
- Bill Ivester: Photography [Concert Photos]

== Notes ==
Volume four of the band's live recording series. This release documents the group's 20th Anniversary Reunion Concert with original bandmates Ric Hordinski and Brian Kelley.

Recorded Live, Friday, December 19, 2008 at The Taft Theatre in Cincinnati, Ohio.

All songs © Over the Rhine/Scampering Songs Publishing et al., ASCAP.

Recordings mixed at Echo Park Studio B in Bloomington, IN.

Mastered at SAE Mastering in Phoenix, AZ.
