= Live from Nowhere, Volume 2 =

Live From Nowhere, Volume Two

Live album by Over the Rhine
- Released: 2007
- Recorded: 2006
- Genre: Americana
- Length: 56:25

Over the Rhine chronology
Discount Fireworks (2007)	Live From Nowhere, Volume Two (2007)	The Trumpet Child (2007)

Live From Nowhere, Volume 2 is a live album by Over the Rhine, released in 2007, containing highlights from the band's 2006 shows. The CD was limited to 5,000 copies and comes in a fold-out digipak.

== Track listing ==
1. I Want You To Be My Love
2. Fever
3. Failed Christian (Ash Wednesday Mix)
4. Long Lost Brother
5. Everybody Wants To Feel Like You

(John Prine)

1. Jesus In New Orleans
2. Anything At All
3. North Pole Man
4. Little Did I Know
5. Orphan Girl
6. Baby It's Cold Outside
7. Hush Now (Tipsy Gypsy Mix)
8. OtR: Off the Rails
