= Live from Nowhere, Volume 3 =

Live from Nowhere, Volume Three

Live album by Over the Rhine
- Released: 2008
- Recorded: 2007
- Genre: Americana
- Length: 51:54

Over the Rhine chronology
The Trumpet Child (2007)	Live from Nowhere, Volume Three (2008)	Live from Nowhere, Volume 4 (2009)

Live from Nowhere, Volume 3 is a live album by Over the Rhine, released in 2008, containing highlights from the band's 2007 shows. The CD is a limited edition and comes in a fold-out digipak.

== Track listing ==
1. Motherless Child
2. Angel Band
3. Hush Now
4. Trouble
5. Nothing is Innocent
6. I'm on a Roll
7. Don't Wait for Tom
8. Drunkard's Prayer
9. Who'm I Kiddin' But Me
10. Northpole Man
11. Snow Angels
12. Latter Days
