= Besides (Over the Rhine album) =

Compilation album by Over the Rhine
- Released: March 11, 1997
- Genre: Rock
- Length: 60:27
- Label: Scampering Songs
- Producer: Linford Detweiler, Over the Rhine

Over the Rhine chronology
The Darkest Night of the Year (1996)	Besides (1997)	Amateur Shortwave Radio (1999)

Professional ratings
Review scores
Source	Rating
Allmusic	link

Besides is a compilation of outtakes, previously unreleased songs, and live recordings by Over the Rhine, released in 1997. While initially intended as a fan club release (the text 'For Rhinelanders Only' appears prominently on the back jewel case insert), the disc has been available at shows and through the band's website consistently since its release.

== Track listing ==
1. The People Here Are Not Shy
2. Hej (I Do)
3. My Love Is A Fever (Live)
4. Within Without (rough mix)
5. (An American DeeJay)
6. Last Night
7. Murder
8. Dead Weight
9. Bothered
10. All I Need Is Everything (chamber music mix)
11. Lucy
12. Miles
13. (Polish DeeJay)
14. If I'm Drowning (Live)

== Personnel ==
- Karin Bergquist: Vocals and Acoustic Guitar
- Linford Detweiler: Acoustic Guitar, Bass, Piano, Mellotron
- Ric Hordinski: Electric Guitar, E-Bow
- Brian Kelley: Drums

=== Additional Personnel ===
- Chris Dahlgren: Bass on "Miles"
- Norm Johns: Cello on "All I Need Is Everything"
