= Paul Mahern =

American record producer

Paul Cantwell Mahern
- Born: September 11, 1963 (age 62); Indianapolis, Indiana, U.S.
- Occupations: Record producer, musician
- Years active: 1979–present
- Known for: Working with John Mellencamp and other artists

Paul Cantwell Mahern (born September 11, 1963), also known as Paul Mahern, is an American rock and pop record producer, mixing and mastering engineer, singer, songwriter, professor, and yoga teacher.

Mahern has worked with acts such as John Mellencamp, Lily & Madeleine, The Fray, Iggy Pop, Lisa Germano, Willie Nelson, Okkervil River, Over the Rhine, Afghan Whigs, Reverend Peyton's Big Damn Band, Magnolia Electric Co., Simrit, Neil Young, and Mercy Creek.

== Early life ==
Paul Cantwell Mahern was born in Indianapolis, Indiana the youngest in a family of eight. He lived there and in Chicago for much of his childhood and returned to Indianapolis as a teenager.

== Career ==
=== As musician ===
In 1979, at age 17, Mahern first gained attention as the singer for The Zero Boys, a hardcore punk band. The band was known nationwide for intense live performances; their debut album Vicious Circle remains a punk-rock staple, recently had a re-release on Secretly Canadian Records. He played in several other Indianapolis bands in the 1980s and 1990s including Dandelion Abortion, Datura Seeds, and DNA-12.

=== As record producer ===
While he was in The Zero Boys, Mahern started learning about the production aspects of record-making. He began recording local Indianapolis-area bands, and began working at Hit City Recording as an in-house engineer. He moved to Bloomington, Indiana and began to work with major label acts including the Blake Babies, The Judybats, and Mysteries Of Life. He started Affirmation Records.

Mahern attracted the attention of John Mellencamp, who works primarily with Mahern as his recording engineer. Most recently they recorded a project for Mellencamp's "No Better Than This" album touring the country with co-producer T-Bone Burnett, to record in rooms with a single 1950's reel-to-reel tape deck and one microphone.

Mahern worked for two years at Indiana University on the NEH-funded Sound Directions project, at the Archives of Traditional Music. He was lead engineer on an IU and Harvard University co-authored paper on the best practices for audio preservation. His work involved all aspects of transferring analog sources to the digital realm, including everything from restoration and repair of old tapes and discs to digitization and metadata management. He has produced and/or engineered many national and local Indiana artists' records including Afghan Whigs, Blake Babies, Lisa Germano, The Fray, Over the Rhine (band), Rev. Peyton's Big Damn Band, Mercy Creek, Sloppy Seconds, Turnerjoy, Toxic Reasons, Antenna, The Judybats, The Sugarfreaks, Thin Lizard Dawn, John Mellencamp, El Nino, John Wilkes Booze, The PIeces, The Mary Janes, Iggy Pop, and Farm Aid.

In 2012, Mahern began working with Lily & Madeleine, a sister duo from Indianapolis. He discovered them and helped them write, later record, and produced their EP and a self-titled full-length album which was released in November 2013 on Asthmatic Kitty Records.

=== Industry recognition ===
- Engineer on The Fray's 2007 Grammy Award-nominated release, How to Save a Life, which was RIAA certified double platinum.
- Engineer and/or Producer on multiple Gold and Platinum records for John Mellencamp: "Words and Music, "Cuttin' Heads", "John Mellencamp", "The Best That I Could Do"
- Engineered multiple Grammy Award-nominated recordings for John Mellencamp: "Your Life is Now", "Peaceful World", "Our Country".

=== Bands and musical projects ===
==== Zero Boys ====
In 1979, at age 17, Mahern became the singer and frontman for an up-and-coming Indianapolis band, the Zero Boys.

Their first release, Livin' in the '80s, was a 7-inch EP released by the band on their own Z-Disc label. Their debut full-length album, Vicious Circle, was released in 1982 with its distinctive bright yellow cover on a local label, Nimrod Records. The Zero Boys have been said to be influential to many current punk and punk-pop bands. Recently, The Hives released a cover of Zero Boys' "Civilization's Dying"

==== Dandelion Abortion (mid 1980s) ====
Paul Mahern, Randy Ochsenrider, Rick Ochsenrider, Mike Sheets

==== Datura Seeds (late 1980s - early 1990s) ====
Late 1980s-Early 1990s. Paul Mahern, Jonee Quest, Lee Cuthbert, Tom Downs, Vess Ruhtenberg

==== DNA-12 (late 1990s) ====
Late 1990s. Paul Mahern, Gretchen Holtz

=== Pseudonyms ===
Mahern is credited and referred to interchangeably with several monikers including:

- Paul Mahern
- Paul Z
- Paul Cantwell Mahern
- Mahan Kalpa Singh
- Mahan Kalpa
