= Devou Park =

Park in Covington, Kentucky

Coordinates: 39.079°N 84.542°W

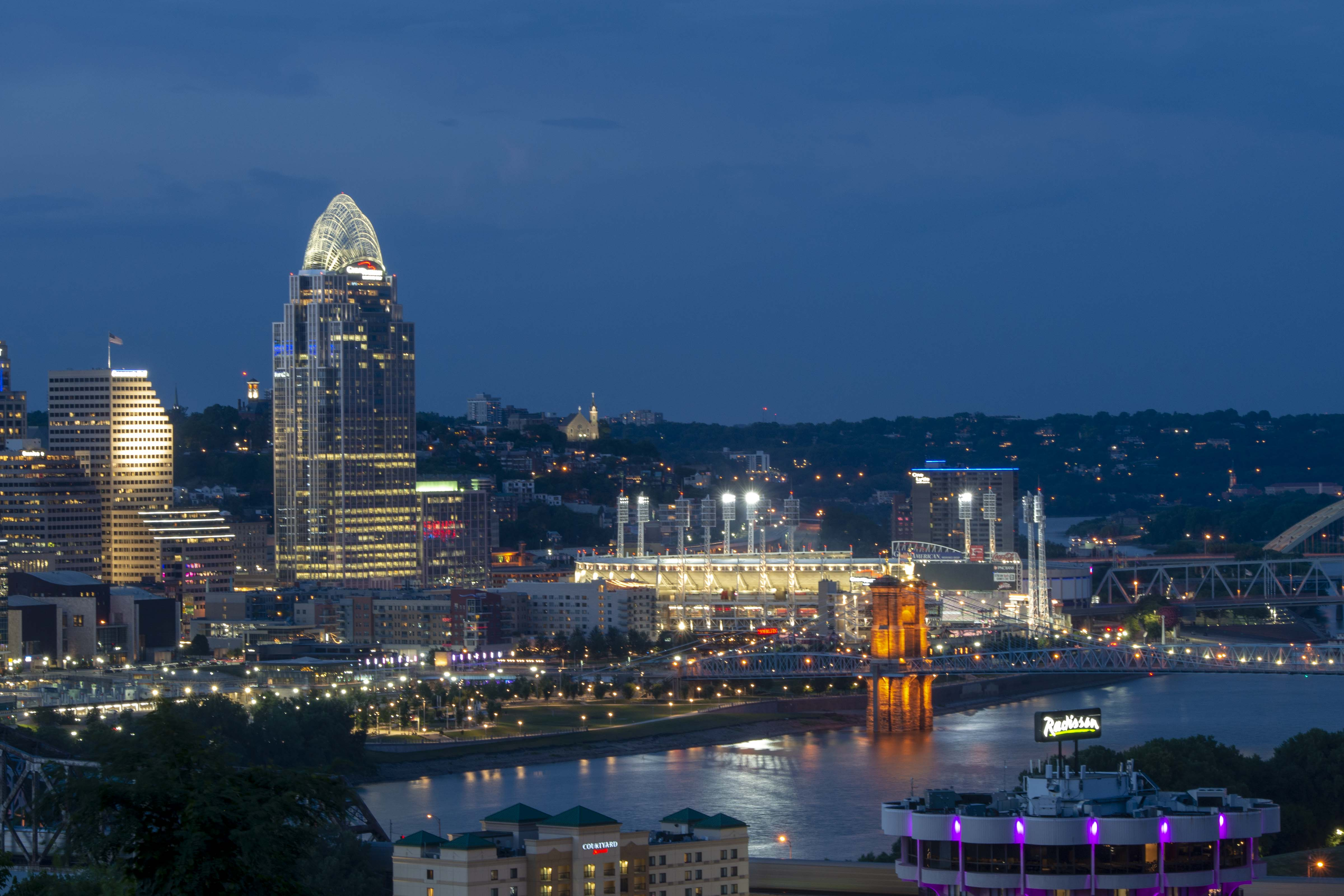
- View of Covington and Cincinnati from Memorial Overlook in Devou Park
- Location: Covington, Kentucky
- Operated by: City of Covington Parks & Recreation Division
- Website: https://www.covingtonky.gov/government/departments/neighborhood-services/parks-recreation/parks/devou-park

Devou Park is a city park in Covington, Kentucky. Encompassing 700 acres (280 ha), it is the city's largest park. The hilltop park's overlooks offer panoramic views of the Cincinnati skyline and the Ohio River valley below.

== History ==
In 1867, Louisa Devou purchased a parcel of land west of Covington, Kentucky, and her brother William and his wife Sarah Ogden Devou soon after bought adjoining acreage on bluffs above the Ohio River. Louisa's land passed to William upon her death, and William and Sarah Devou and their sons continued to acquire nearby land through 1908. In all, the estate encompassed 505 acres assembled from 41 purchased tracts, much of this land originally owned by the Montague and Eubank families.

Proceeds from William Devou's millinery supply business funded many of these acquisitions, and the Devous improved and expanded a homestead on the site (the Eubank-Devou house) and developed some of the acreage for a family farm. Upon Sarah Ogden Devou's death in 1910, sons William and Charles granted the estate to the city of Covington, on the following conditions: that the city spend $100,000 for park improvements in the first six years after the land transfer, that the park carry the family name, and that Charles would continue to live in the family homestead.

After the Covington Park Board accepted the donation, Covington voters approved a $100,000 bond issue in 1910, and the city took possession of the property on November 28, 1910. In 1911, the Park Board hired J.J. Weaver to survey and plan roads connecting the park to existing arteries, and two roads were completed in 1912. Two years later, the city built a series of concrete staircases alternating with paths that connected and the overlook with the city below on Western Avenue.

Charles Devou worked as the park's superintendent until shortly before his death in 1922. And when William Devou Jr. died in 1937, most of his assets (appraised at almost $1.1 million) were deeded in trust to maintain the park.

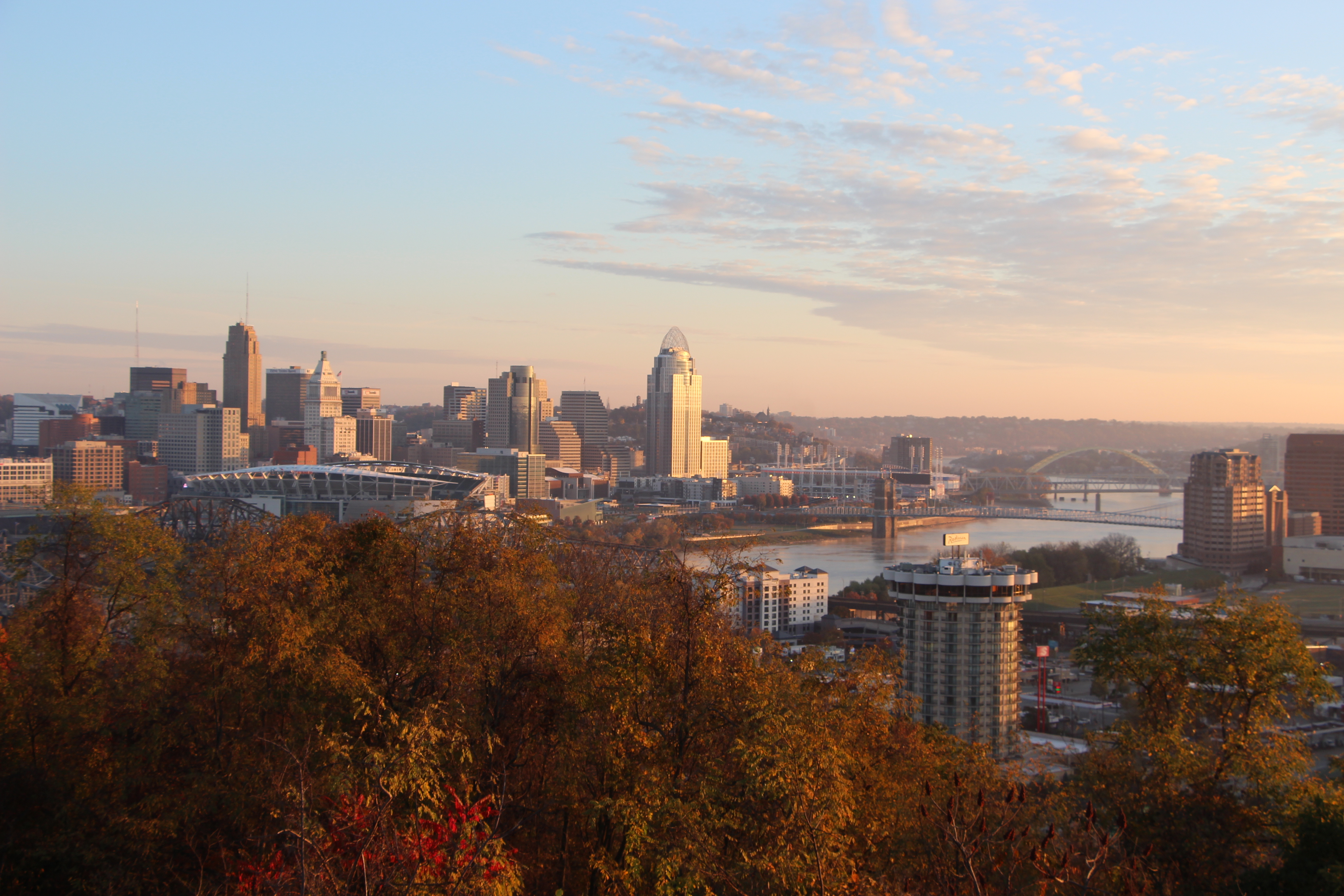
view of downtown Covington and Cincinnati from Memorial Overlook

In 1967, the City of Covington executed a land swap that ceded land needed for improvements to Dixie Highway and for the Covington campus of Northern Kentucky University. In return, Devou Park expanded across Sleepy Hollow Road onto hills overlooking Ludlow, Kentucky. The park now covers more than 700 contiguous acres.

== Historical features ==
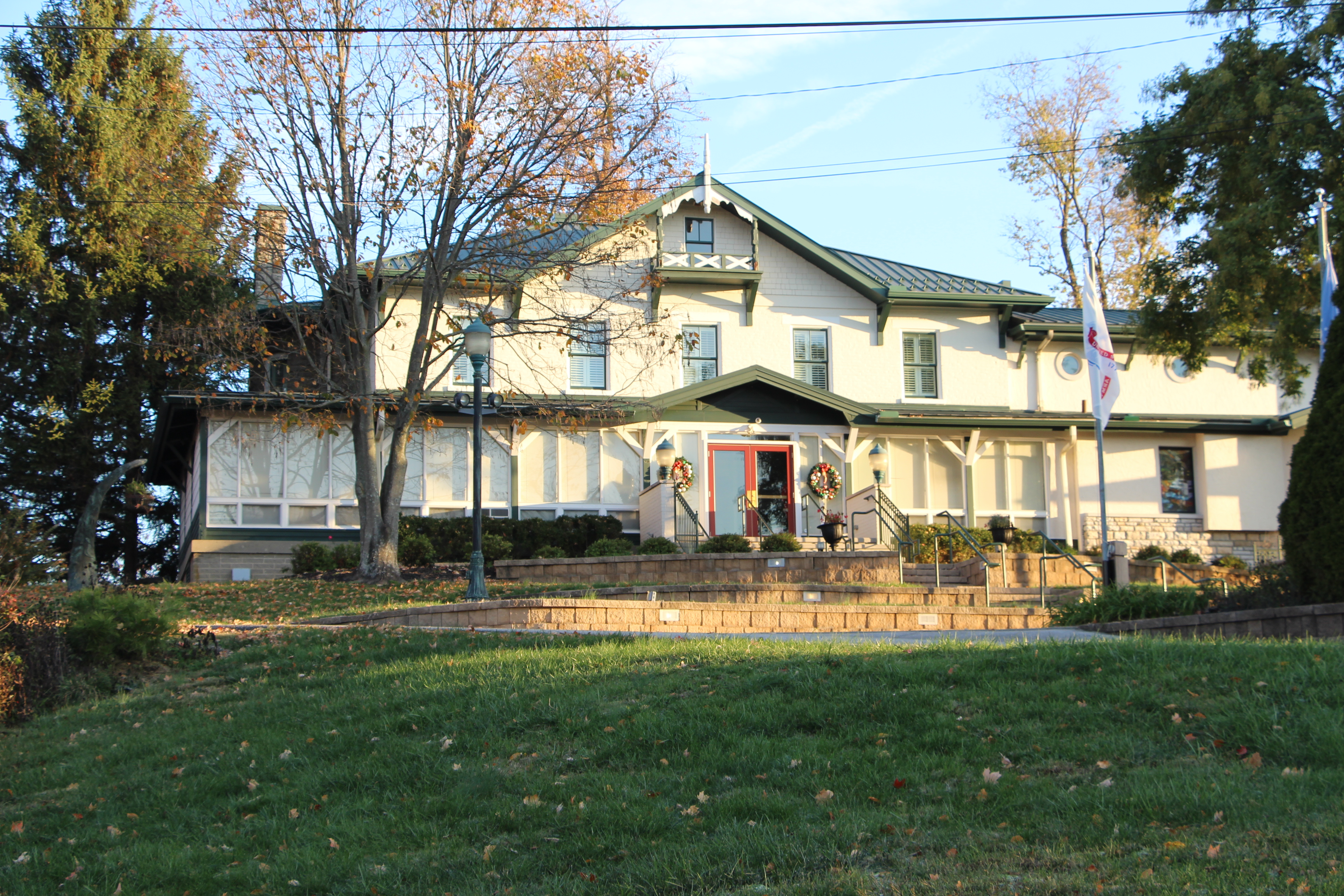
Behringer-Crawford Museum

Historians have identified and located two Civil War fortifications within the park, in the hills west of Sleepy Hollow Road: Battery Coombs (1861) and Battery Bates (1862).

William and Sarah Devou inherited a single-story brick house built in the Federal style and built a two-story stone addition adorned with a gabled roof in the style of a Swiss chalet. Charles lived in the house until his death; the building now displays the collections of the Behringer-Crawford Museum (originally the William Behringer Memorial Museum).

A large dry-stone spring complex occupies a hillside below the homestead. In the donation deed, the Devous included a condition that stipulated "the several fine springs and wells to be carefully preserved."

The north-central sector of the park features Prisoner's Lake, so-named for jail inmates whom the city detailed to quarry and crush limestone from an existing quarry starting in 1916. Prisoners worked the site (and sometimes escaped) until 1920, excavating the quarry to the current depth of the lake (water filled the quarry in 1924), which is now stocked with bass, trout, bluegill, sunfish, and catfish and hosts an annual fishing derby for Covington youth.

== Historical amenities ==
Partly in response to Charles Devou's mandate that the city make provisions to raise revenue sufficient to maintain park amenities, the City Commission planned a municipal and revenue-generating golf course in 1922. John Brophy of Fort Mitchell, Kentucky designed the original nine holes, and the Covington Tennis Club proposed five clay tennis courts in 1923. A clubhouse for golfers and tennis players was designed in 1929 by Leslie Deglow but lasted only until a fire destroyed it in 1933. Its successor was built in 1934.

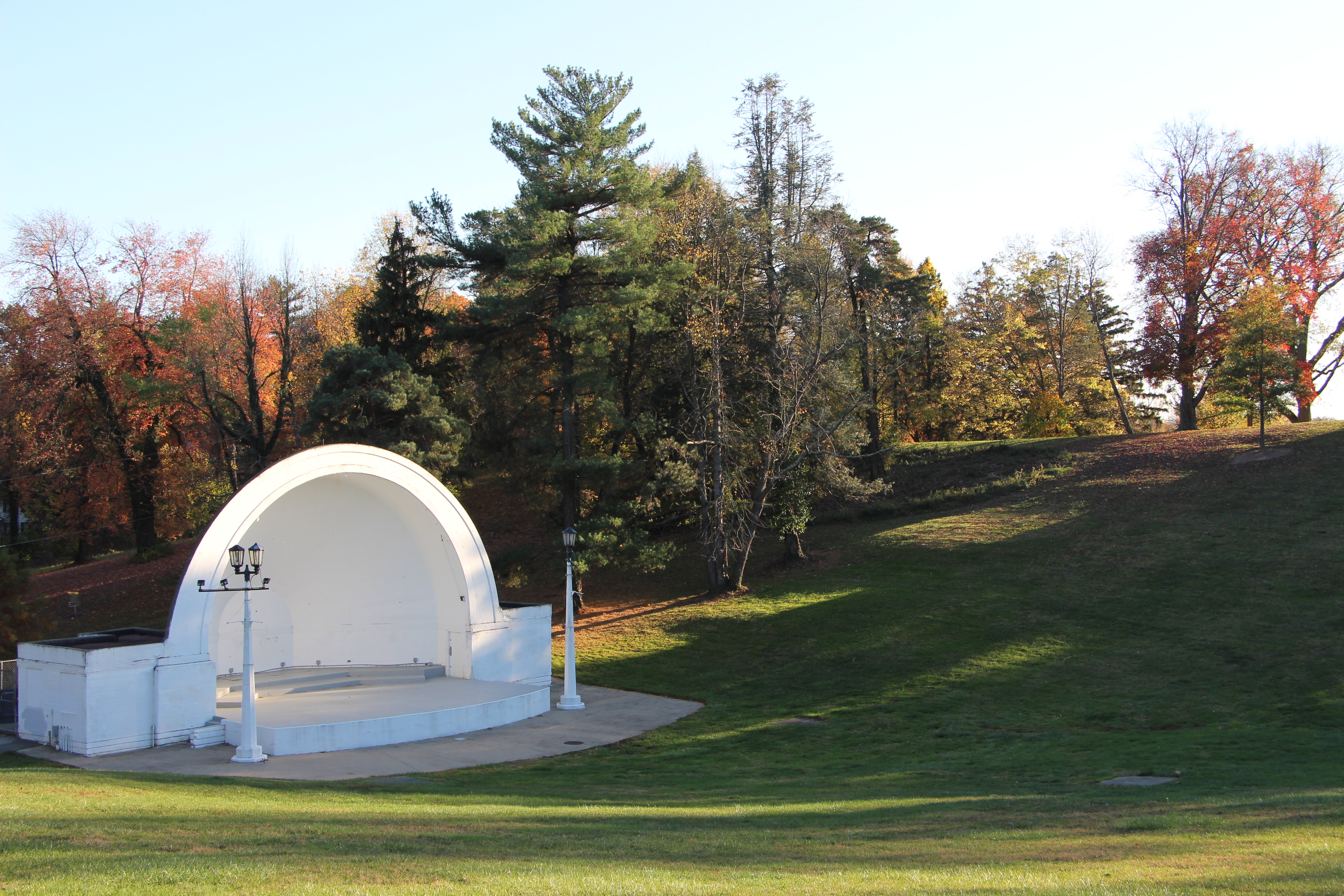
Devou Park bandshell

In 1938, a $97,251 grant from the Works Progress Administration funded two swimming pools, a shelter house constructed of native fieldstone at a point overlooking the Ohio River and downtown Cincinnati, and a bandshell occupying a natural amphitheater. A crowd of 40,000 attended an inaugural concert in August 1939.

New Deal-era federal funding also sponsored the construction of two smaller stone shelters and a series of concrete-and-flagstone benches.

In 1958, the Memorial Building replaced the original shelter house at the overlook.

== Current amenities ==
Today Devou Park boasts four reservable picnic shelters – Volpenhein Pavilion, the Stone Shelter, Michael Breaden Picnic Shelter, and the shelter at Gus Sheehan Park; an expanded 18-hole golf course that opened in 1995 after a robust community discussion; an 18-hole disc golf course; the John Volz and Benny Vastine nature trails; and several miles of paved hike-bike trails that link major attractions in the park. An additional twelve miles of multi-use backcountry trails (maintained by volunteers from the Cincinnati Off-Road Alliance) criss-cross the woods on either side of Sleepy Hollow Road.

The original bandshell still hosts concerts and plays throughout the summer months, including a regular schedule with the Kentucky Symphony Orchestra, bluegrass concerts, Shakespeare performances, and film screenings.

The Drees Pavilion, which opened in 2003 on the overlook site of the Memorial Building, was built and donated to the park by the Drees Company. Managed by the Devou Properties, Inc., the Pavilion hosts events year-round and designates excess profits to fund projects throughout the park.

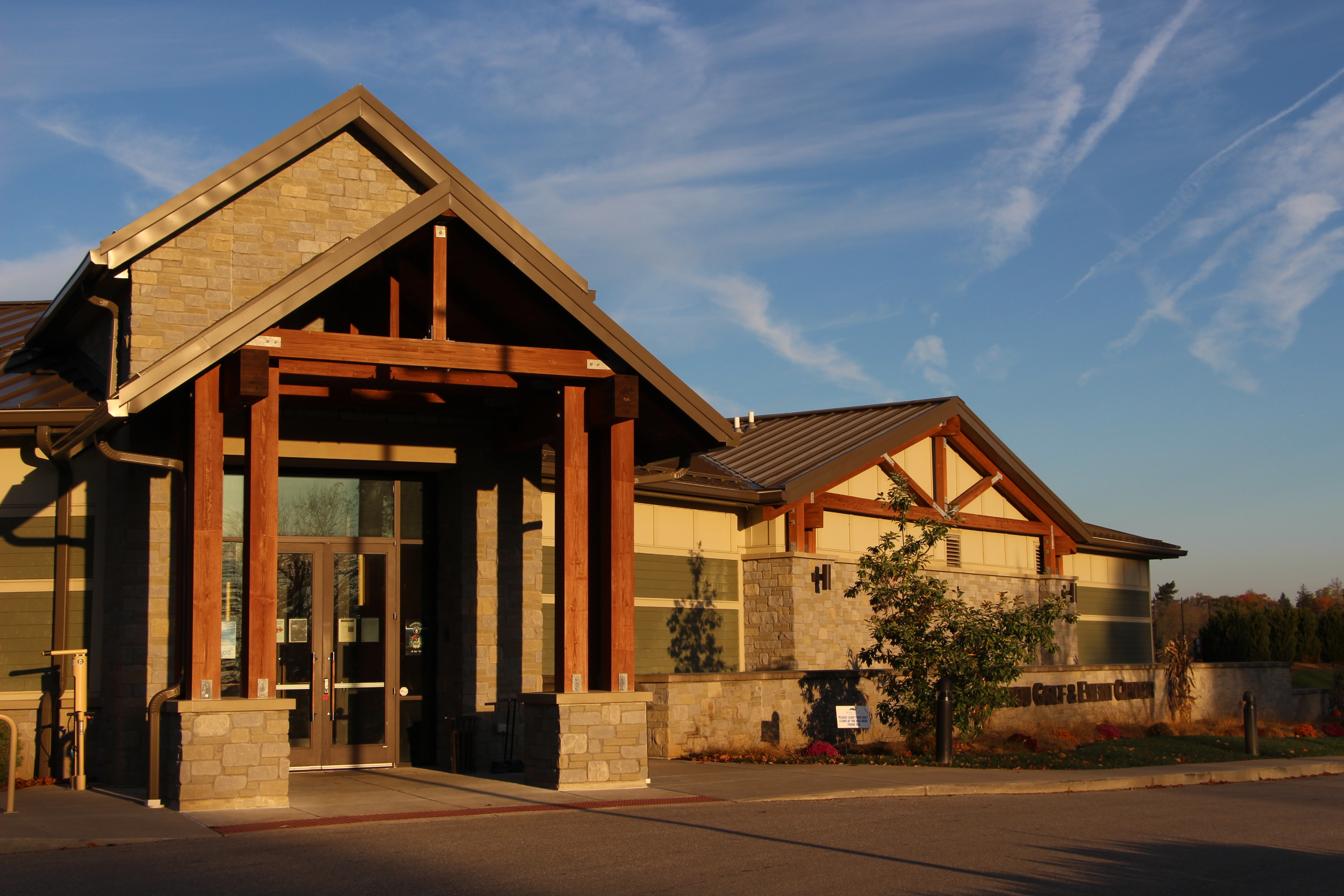
Devou Golf and Event Center

The Devou Golf and Event Center opened in 2017 and features a large gathering space, a patio overlooking the golf course, a bar and grill, and a pro shop.

== Museum ==
The Behringer-Crawford Museum, which has occupied the Eubank-Devou house since 1950, documents the natural and cultural history of Northern Kentucky. The museum curates a large collection of local artifacts and features rotating exhibitions throughout the year, as well as hosting a summer music series, historical lectures, and the freshART show to benefit educational programming. Adjacent to the museum is NaturePlay@BCM, a nature-themed play area that doubles as a WinterWonderland Christmas lights display.

== Sports Events ==
- From 2014 to 2016 the Pan American Cyclo-cross Championships were held in the park.
