= Lily & Madeleine =

Musical group

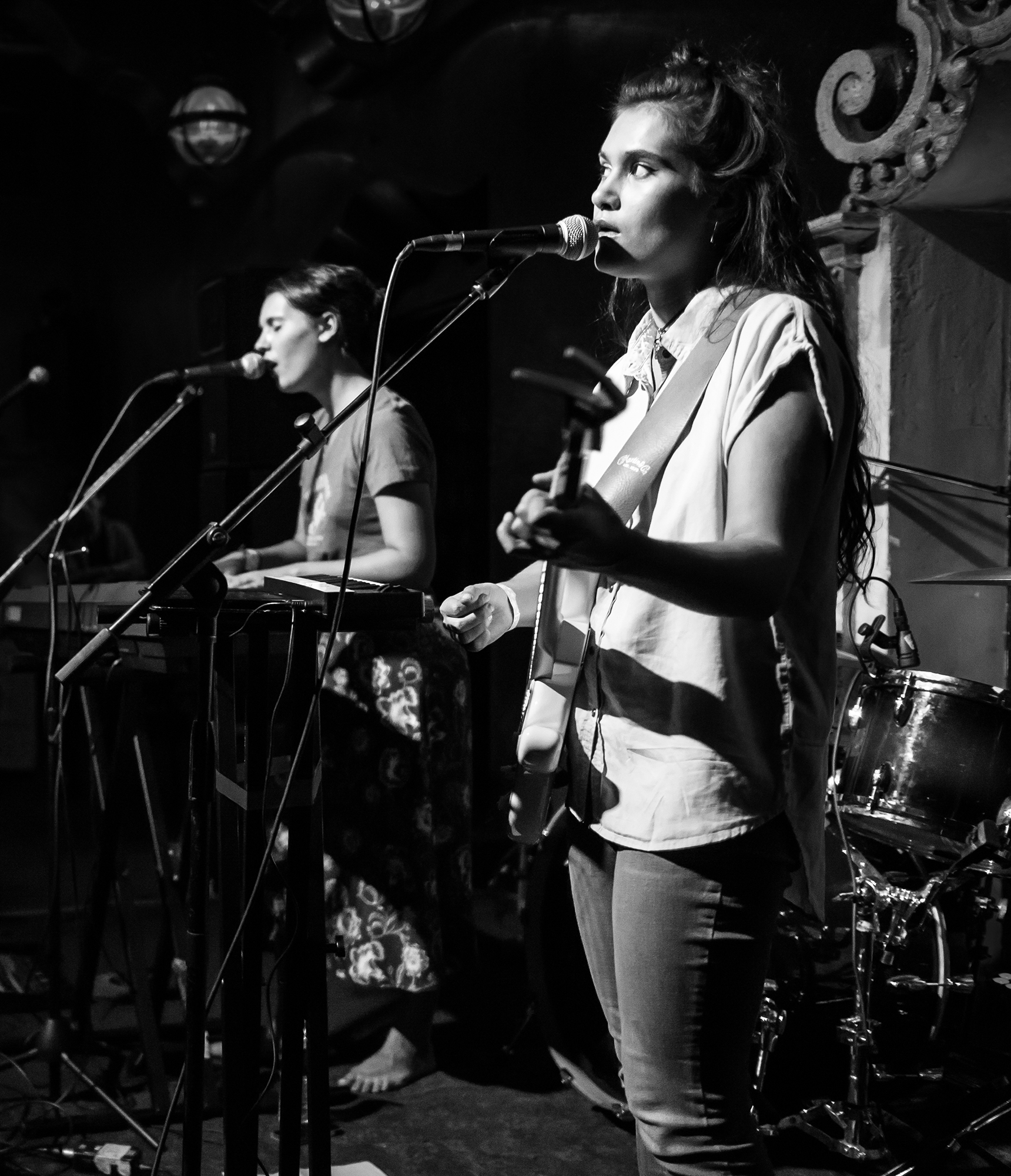
- Performing in 2016

Background information
- Origin: Indianapolis, Indiana, U.S.
- Genre: Folk pop
- Years active: 2012–present
- Labels: New West, Asthmatic Kitty
- Members: Lily Jurkiewicz; Madeleine Jurkiewicz
- Website: lilandmad.com

Lily & Madeleine are an American folk pop duo from Indianapolis, Indiana, consisting of the sisters Lily and Madeleine Jurkiewicz. They have released five full-length studio albums, Lily & Madeleine (2013) and Fumes (2014) on Asthmatic Kitty, Keep It Together (2016) and Canterbury Girls (2019) on New West Records, and the self-released Nite Swim (2023).

== Biography ==
Lily & Madeleine began singing together as high school students, uploading home videos of cover songs to YouTube. On the strength of those videos, the Bloomington, Indiana, producer Paul Mahern invited them into his studio to record their first EP, The Weight of the Globe, when their class schedules permitted.

With the help of Kenny Childers (Gentleman Caller), they co-wrote their first original songs for the EP, and a video of Lily & Madeleine singing in Mahern's studio appeared on the front page of Reddit, a news aggregator site. The Weight of the Globe was picked as a 2013 release by Sufjan Stevens's Asthmatic Kitty Records, and John Mellencamp asked the sisters to contribute guest vocals to the soundtrack of his musical, Ghost Brothers of Darkland County.

In February 2013, they sold out their first live shows in Indianapolis. In October of the same year, they made their national TV debut on CBS This Morning prior to the release of their first LP at the end of the month. In reviewing Lily & Madeleine, The New York Times argues that "the thing that flags them as extraordinary is their sibling vocal blend, deep and seamless and relaxed". In addition to promotional videos such as "Back to the River", directed by Allister Ann in support of The Weight of the Globe and "Come to Me" from Lily & Madeleine, directed by Tyler Jones, Lily & Madeleine continue to release live videos of their acoustic performances in the studio, directed by graduates of Bishop Chatard High School in Indianapolis, Nicole Lehrman and Stuart Hotwagoner.

In February 2019, they released their fourth LP, Canterbury Girls, to favorable reviews. Pop Magazine awarded the album a rating of 5 out of 5 stars, praising it as "a beautifully balanced album" and saying that "Lily & Madeleine ask tough questions–about the world, about modern love, about themselves–but their mere delivery is graceful, vulnerable, and ultimately empowering". The album received a rating of 4 out of 5 stars from AllMusic which called it a "solid set of songs", adding that producers "Fitchuck and Tashian prove a tasteful fit for the duo".

On Christmas Day 2019, New West Records released a cover version of The Beatles' song "Across the Universe" performed by Lily & Madeleine with the Accidentals.

== Discography ==
=== Albums ===
- Lily & Madeleine (Asthmatic Kitty, 2013)
- Fumes (Asthmatic Kitty, 2014)
- Keep It Together (New West Records, 2016)
- Canterbury Girls (New West Records, 2019)
- Nite Swim (2023)

=== EPs ===
- The Weight of the Globe (Asthmatic Kitty, 2013)
- Daytrotter Session, 31 May 2013 – Daytrotter Studio, Rock Island, IL (Daytrotter, 2013)

=== Appearances ===
- "Things I'll Later Lose" in Pretty Little Liars (2012)
- "Truth" by John Mellencamp on Ghost Brothers of Darkland County (Hear Music, 2013)
- "Lost It to Trying" by Son Lux on Lanterns (Joyful Noise, 2013)
- "Danny Boy" by Time for Three on Time for Three (Universal Music Group, 2014)
- A Prairie Home Companion on 2 May 2015
- "What Kind of Friend" on Treasure of the Broken Land: The Songs of Mark Heard, 2017
- "Can't Help the Way I Feel" in Promising Young Woman (2020)
- "The Hour" by Son Lux on Tomorrows III (City Slang, 2021)
