= Over the Rhine (band) =

American folk band

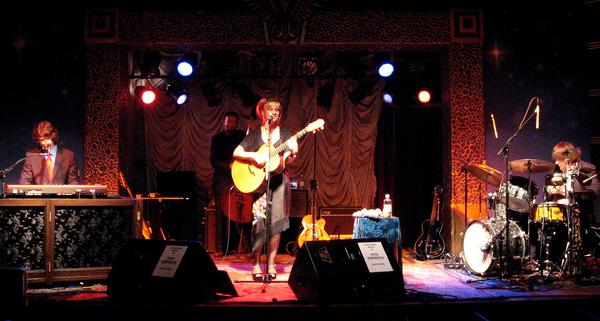
- Over the Rhine playing in Charlotte, NC in October 2007

Background information
- Origin: Cincinnati, Ohio, U.S.
- Genres: Folk, Americana
- Years active: 1989–present
- Labels: I.R.S. Records, Back Porch, Great Speckled Dog
- Members: Linford Detweiler; Karin Bergquist; Brad Meinerding
- Past members: Ric Hordinski; Brian Kelley
- Website: overtherhine.com

Over the Rhine is an American, Ohio-based folk music band that was formed in 1989 by Linford Detweiler, Karin Bergquist, Ric Hordinski, and Brian Kelley.

Over the years, they have toured and recorded in many variations. Over the Rhine is now primarily Bergquist (vocals, acoustic guitar, piano) and Detweiler (keyboards, electric bass, vocals) accompanied by complementary musicians on albums and tours.

Over the course of the band's existence, they have recorded at least 15 studio albums and have shared the stage with Bob Dylan, John Prine, Adrian Belew, Squeeze, Ani DiFranco, My Morning Jacket, Hem, and Cowboy Junkies. In 2016, they hosted the first annual Nowhere Else Festival on their farm in southwest Ohio.

== History ==
=== Formation and 1990s ===
The band's namesake and place of origin is the Cincinnati, Ohio, neighborhood Over-the-Rhine. Karin attended school in Barnesville, Ohio and graduated from Barnesville High School in 1984. She then went to Malone University, located in Canton, Ohio, where she met Linford.

Over the Rhine formed in the spring of 1989, as a quartet with Detweiler, Bergquist, and guitarist Ric Hordinski and drummer Brian Kelley. At the time, Detweiler, Hordinski, and Kelley were also touring as part of the final incarnation of Servant. Over the Rhine independently released their first two albums,Till We Have Faces, in 1991 (named for the C. S. Lewis book of the same title) and Patience in 1992. Later in 1992, Over the Rhine signed with label giant I.R.S. Records, and their first two albums were re-issued. In 1994, I.R.S. fully funded the band's third LP, Eve, which was released to rave reviews.

When I.R.S. records was bought out in 1996, Over the Rhine was released from their five-album contract and went on to independently release Good Dog, Bad Dog and The Darkest Night of the Year, both of which outsold the three previous I.R.S. releases combined. Hordinski left the band in December 1996, while Kelley continued to play into 1997 before departing. Karin and Linford were married in the fall of 1996 in Cincinnati.

=== 2000s ===
Between 1999 and 2004, Linford recorded and released three solo projects composed of home-recorded acoustic, piano-based music.

In 2001, Over the Rhine signed with Virgin Records/Back Porch and released Films for Radio to critical acclaim.

They released double album Ohio in 2003. Paste magazine granted one of its first five-star reviews to Ohio and listed it as #26 of "The 50 Best Albums of the 2000s", calling it "more than simply a dense, rich, vulnerable collection of songs; it’s a dirt road companion on that difficult journey inward, upward".

Due to issues within their marriage, Detweiler and Bergquist decided to cancel their tour in support of Ohio. They considered divorce but after attending marriage counseling, they ultimately chose to reconcile. The songs on their next album, Drunkard's Prayer (2005), tell the story of that difficult period in their marriage. They recorded the album entirely in their living room in Norwood, Ohio, and decided to move to a new home soon after.

In June 2006, Paste named Over the Rhine as #74 of "100 Best Living Songwriters", saying that their "understated writing style [...] constantly puts the maxim “less is more” to the test—and succeeds."

A limited edition live album titled Live From Nowhere, Volume 1 was released in April 2006. A second limited edition live album, Live From Nowhere, Volume 2 was released in March 2007, just over a month after Discount Fireworks.

In 2007, Over the Rhine started their own independent label, Great Speckled Dog (named after their Great Dane, Elroy).The Trumpet Child and the "Live From Nowhere" series have been released on Great Speckled Dog.

In January 2008, Paste's video podcast interviewed Over the Rhine and featured a live performance. The original foursome reunited in December 2008 at The Taft Theatre (in Cincinnati) to celebrate the 20th Anniversary of the formation of the band, and again in the summer of 2010 at Ric's studio, "the Monastery", to play the album Good Dog Bad Dog live, in its entirety.

=== 2010s ===
Over the Rhine's album The Long Surrender was released nationally on February 8, 2011, on the band's own Great Speckled Dog label. It was recorded in California with producer Joe Henry, and contains a duet with Lucinda Williams on "Undamned" and two songs co-written with Joe Henry. Paste named Over the Rhine's The Long Surrender one of the Top 50 Best Records of the year.

Over the Rhine's album Meet Me at the Edge of the World is a double album that was produced by Joe Henry. The songs were recorded in two sessions at The Garfield House in South Pasadena in 2013: disc one, Sacred Ground, March 28–30 and disc two, Blue Jean Sky, April 1–3. Aimee Mann appears as a special guest vocalist on the song "Don't Let The Bastards Get You Down". The album was released nationally on September 3, 2013. In their review, the Los Angeles Times rated the album 3.5 out of 4 stars and stated: "Over the Rhine seems to inhabit another time, one that sounds awfully appealing here."

On March 15, 2019, Over the Rhine released Love & Revelation, on their own Great Speckled Dog Record label. The album was produced by the band and recorded and mixed by Ryan Freeland. The first single from the album, the title track, was premiered by Paste almost two months earlier. The album premiered on Rolling Stone along with a brief article about the album and the duo's creative process. The album was met with critical acclaim from sources including No Depression and Associated Press, who wrote "Love & Revelation is a subdued but lovely celebration...It won't surprise longtime fans that the topics are often sad and the tempos mostly slow, all the better to showcase Bergquist's warm, wise, honest alto. She sounds better than ever, with a depth and richness that makes her voice resonate like a prayer."

=== 2020s ===
In 2020, Cincinnati Pops Orchestra featured Over the Rhine in their special July 4 livestream alongside Melinda Doolittle.

In 2023, Detweiler and Bergquist produced Joshua Thomas's debut album, The Wings Outside (2024). It was recorded at Nowhere Else, their recording studio and performing arts space.

In 2024, Over the Rhine released two albums on their website. Hymn Time in the Land of Abandon is a collection of hymns, while Ten Songs without Words is a solo piano album by Detweiler.

== Nowhere Farm and Nowhere Else Festival ==
Around 2005, Detweiler and Bergquist moved to a farm in rural southwest Ohio, which they dubbed the Nowhere Farm. In 2015, they began raising funds to renovate a nearby 140-year-old barn in Martinsville, Ohio, into a recording studio and performing arts space called Nowhere Else. Over the Rhine hosted the first Nowhere Else Festival on Memorial Day weekend of 2016. The event has happened every year except for 2020 due to the COVID-19 pandemic. Since 2021, it has been held on Labor Day Weekend. The festival has featured artists like Patty Griffin, Mary Gauthier, Joe Henry, Allison Russell, James McMurtry, John Paul White, Birds of Chicago, Leigh Nash, Lily & Madeleine, and Valerie June.

== Discography ==
=== Studio albums ===
- 1991 - Till We Have Faces (Scampering Songs)
- 1992 - Patience (Scampering Songs)
- 1992 - Patience (I.R.S./EMI Records re-issue; different track order)
- 1994 - Eve (I.R.S./EMI Records)
- 1995 - Till We Have Faces (I.R.S./EMI Records re-issue; different track listing)
- 1996 - Good Dog Bad Dog: The Home Recordings (Imaginary Records)
- 1996 - The Darkest Night of the Year (Imaginary Records; holiday album)
- 2000 - Good Dog Bad Dog: The Home Recordings (Back Porch/Narada/Virgin/EMI Records re-issue; different track listing)
- 2001 - Films for Radio (Back Porch/Narada/Virgin/EMI Records)
- 2003 - Ohio (Back Porch/Narada/Virgin/EMI Records; double album)
- 2005 - Drunkard's Prayer (Back Porch/Narada/Virgin/EMI Records)
- 2006 - Snow Angels (Great Speckled Dog, holiday album)
- 2007 - The Trumpet Child (Great Speckled Dog)
- 2008 - Good Dog Bad Dog: The Home Recordings (Great Speckled Dog re-issue; different track listing with additional tracks)
- 2008 - The Darkest Night of the Year (Great Speckled Dog re-issue; Christmas album)
- 2011 - The Long Surrender (Great Speckled Dog)
- 2013 - Meet Me at the Edge of the World (Great Speckled Dog)
- 2014 - Blood Oranges in the Snow (Great Speckled Dog, holiday album))
- 2019 - Love & Revelation (Great Speckled Dog)
- 2024- Hymn Time in the Land of Abandon

=== Live albums ===
- 1999 - Amateur Shortwave Radio (Grey Ghost Records) compiled by Linford Detweiler to mark the 10th anniversary of the band's first recordings in 1989.
- 2004 - Changes Come: Over the Rhine Live
- 2006 - Live From Nowhere, Volume 1 (limited edition run of 3,000)
- 2007 - Live From Nowhere, Volume 2 (limited edition run of 5,000)
  - CD copies of Live From Nowhere Volumes 1 and 2 are out of print and only available via iTunes Store.
- 2008 - Live From Nowhere, Volume 3 (limited edition run)
- 2009 - Live From Nowhere, Volume 4 (limited edition run)
- 2010 - Good Dog Bad Dog Live (Website Exclusive)
- 2015 - Barn Raising Live (Website Exclusive)

=== Compilations ===
- 1997 - Besides (Imaginary Records; demos, alternate takes, mixes, and unreleased material from 1991 to 1997)
- 2000 - Roaring Lambs (Squint Entertainment) Over the Rhine contributed the song "Goodbye" for this compilation album.
- 2002 - The Cutting Room Floor (demos, outtakes and other material from the Films For Radio era)
- 2002 - Hidden Treasures: Cincinnati's Tribute to King Records' Legacy Over the Rhine contributed the song "Fever" for this compilation album.
- 2006 - The Message: Psalms Over the Rhine contributed the song "Flown Free" based on Psalm 124 & Psalm 129 for this compilation album.
- 2007 - Discount Fireworks (Back Porch Records; career-spanning compilation plus one unreleased song)
- 2007 - For The Kids Three! Over the Rhine contributed an original tune titled "The Poopsmith Song" for this compilation.
- 2009 - Notes from the Monastery (Over the Rhine contributed the cover of "Hard Times (Come Again No More)" and a new version of "Flown Free" which was a digital only bonus track)
- 2011 - Paint it Black: An Alt-Country Tribute to the Rolling Stones Over the Rhine contributed the Rolling Stones cover "Waiting On a Friend"

=== Special releases ===
- 1994 - Serpents and Gloves (VHS-only video/documentary release; IRS Records)
- 2006 - Snow Angels (Karin's Acoustic Sketches) (digital-only bonus)
- 2010 - "OTR 2010 Demos" (A digital gift of 12 demos given to those fans who pre-ordered/funded The Long Surrender "Let's Make a Record")
- 2012 - "OtR 2012 Demos" (A digital gift of 12 demos given to those fans who pre-ordered/funded The Farm "Let's Make a Record" which became Meet Me At The Edge Of The World)
- 2013 - Five Good Reasons To Meet Me (Noisetrade.com Exclusive compilation of tracks from "Meet Me At The Edge Of The World".)
- 2014 - "Even The Snow Turns Blue" (An Over the Rhine Christmas compilation, Digital only download for Noisetrade.com featuring selections from all three holiday records by the band.)

=== Solo albums by Linford Detweiler ===
- 1999 - Solo Piano: I Don't Think There's No Need to Bring Nothin' (Music for First Kind Sight) (What Reindeer and Grey Ghost Records)
- 2001 - Grey Ghost Stories (Grey Ghost Records)
- 2004 - Unspoken Requests (Grey Ghost Records)
- 2024 - Ten Songs without Words

=== Albums by Ric Hordinski, solo and as Monk ===
- 1997 - Quiver
- 1998 - Hush
- 1999 - Blink
- 2000 - "O" (EP)
- 2001 - How Like a Winter (holiday album)
- 2003 - When I Consider How My Light Is Spent (as Ric Hordinski)
- 2005 - 12/05 (EP, CDR)
- 2007 - The Silence of Everything Yearned For
- 2009 - Notes from the Monastery (various artists produced by Hordinski)
- 2013 - Arthur's Garden
- 2024 - Flesh + Ghost
