= Rosy Jack World =

EP by Blake Babies
- Released: June 1991
- Genre: Alternative rock
- Length: 17:44
- Label: Mammoth Records
- Producers: Gary Smith, Blake Babies and Paul Mahern

Blake Babies chronology
| Sunburn (1990) | Rosy Jack World (1991) | God Bless The Blake Babies (2001) |

Rosy Jack World is an EP recording by the Blake Babies, released in 1991. The album title was taken from a song on The Frogs' 1989 album It's Only Right and Natural.

== Reception ==
Doug Iverson of the Toledo Blade wrote that the EP's original songs were what "really sparks the listener's interest." SPIN magazine's Sue Cummings stated that the EP wasn't as "great a departure as last time - rather, it crystallizes the melodic impetus of Sunburn."

== Track listing ==
1. "Temptation Eyes" - 2:59 (Harvey Price, Daniel Walsh)
2. "Downtime" - 3:15 (John Strohm)
3. "Take Me" - 3:14 (Juliana Hatfield, John Strohm)
4. "Severed Lips" - 4:15 (J Mascis)
5. "Nirvana" - 4:03 (Juliana Hatfield)

== Personnel ==
- Juliana Hatfield - vocals, bass, acoustic guitar and piano
- John Strohm - vocals, guitar
- Freda Love - drums
- Henry Rollins - sampled voice on "Downtime"
- Diamanda Galás - sampled voice on "Downtime"

== Production ==
- Producer: Gary Smith, Blake Babies and Paul Mahern
- Engineer: Steve Haigler and Paul Mahern
- Design: Lane Wurster
- Photography: Kyle S. Burkhart
