= Machines of Loving Grace (disambiguation) =

Machines of Loving Grace were an American industrial rock band that got their name from the 1967 poem "All Watched Over by Machines of Loving Grace" by Richard Brautigan.

Machines of Loving Grace may also refer to:

- Machines of Loving Grace (album), a 1991 album by the band
- "Machines of Loving Grace", a 2009 song by Princess Chelsea from Lil' Golden Book
- Machines of Loving Grace: The Quest for Common Ground Between Humans and Robots, a 2015 nonfiction book by John Markoff
- Spectre - Machines of Loving Grace, a 2021 soundtrack album by Para One
- "Machines of Loving Grace", a 2024 essay by Dario Amodei.

== See also ==
- All Watched Over by Machines of Loving Grace (disambiguation)
