= Innocence and Experience =

Compilation album by Blake Babies
- Released: 1993
- Genre: Alternative rock
- Labels: Mammoth Records, White Records P/L
- Producers: Paul Mahern and Blake Babies

Blake Babies chronology
Rosy Jack World (1991)	Innocence and Experience (1993)	God Bless The Blake Babies (2001)

Singles from Innocence and Experience
- 1. "Temptation Eyes" Released: 1991; 2. "Take Me" Released: 1991

Professional ratings
Review scores
Source	Rating
AllMusic	4/5 stars
Christgau's Consumer Guide	A–
Tom Hull – on the Web	A−

Innocence and Experience is a compilation album by the Blake Babies, released in 1993. The title is a reference to the William Blake collection of poems Songs of Innocence and of Experience.

== Track listing ==
1. "Wipe It Up" - 2.59
2. "Rain [Demo]" - 3.51
3. "Boiled Potato" - 2.33
4. "Lament" - 3.30
5. "Cesspool" - 3.17
6. "You Don't Give Up" - 3.43
7. "Star [Demo]" - 2.52
8. "Sanctify" - 4.58
9. "Out There" - 2.49
10. "Girl In A Box" - 2.40
11. "I'm Not Your Mother" - 3.14
12. "Temptation Eyes" - 2.59
13. "Downtime" - 3.13
14. "Over And Over [Live]" - 3.52

== Personnel ==
- Juliana Hatfield - vocals, guitars, bass, piano and keyboards
- John Strohm - vocals, guitars, bass and keyboards
- Freda Love Smith - vocals and drums
