= Sunburn (Blake Babies album) =

Studio album by Blake Babies
- Released: 1990
- Genre: Alternative rock, jangle pop
- Length: 39:37
- Label: Mammoth
- Producer: Gary Smith

Blake Babies chronology
Earwig (1989)	Sunburn (1990)	Rosy Jack World (1991)

Sunburn is the third album by the Blake Babies, released in 1990.

== Critical reception ==
Professional ratings
Review scores
Source	Rating
AllMusic	4.5/5 stars
Robert Christgau	A−
The Encyclopedia of Popular Music	3/5 stars
MusicHound Rock: The Essential Album Guide	5/5 stars
The Rolling Stone Album Guide	3.5/5 stars
Spin Alternative Record Guide	9/10

MusicHound Rock: The Essential Album Guide wrote that "Strohm's guitar sound—mixing electric sinew and acoustic jangle—is at its apex here." The Spin Alternative Record Guide called the album "easily the best record any of the Blake Babies had anything to do with."

== Track listing ==
All tracks are written by Juliana Hatfield except as noted.

CD
No.	Title	Writer(s)	Length
1.	"I'm Not Your Mother"		3:12
2.	"Out There"	Hatfield, John Strohm	2:46
3.	"Star"	Hatfield, Strohm	2:59
4.	"Look Away"		3:12
5.	"Sanctify"	Hatfield, Strohm, Freda Boner	4:59
6.	"Girl in a Box"	Strohm	2:41
7.	"Train"	Strohm	4:49
8.	"I'll Take Anything"		3:28
9.	"Watch Me Now, I'm Calling"		2:28
10.	"Gimme Some Mirth"		3:00
11.	"Kiss and Make Up"		2:31
12.	"A Million Years"		3:37
Total length:			39:42

== Personnel ==
- Juliana Hatfield – vocals and bass
- John Strohm – guitar and vocals
- Freda Love (also known as Freda Boner) – drums

Production

- Producers: Gary Smith
- Engineers: Steve Haigler
- Design: Lane Wurster
- Artwork: Susan Huffman
- Photography: Jeanne Marie Head
