= Hideout (Antenna album) =

Studio album by Antenna
- Released: 1993
- Genre: Indie rock
- Label: Mammoth
- Producers: Antenna, Paul Mahern

Antenna chronology
Sleep (1992)	Hideout (1993)	For Now (1994)

Hideout is an album by the American indie rock band Antenna, released in 1993. It is the band's second album.

== Production ==
The album was produced by Antenna and Paul Mahern, and was recorded at Studio 512, in Indianapolis. Patrick Spurgeon had replaced Freda Love on drums; the band also brought in guitarist Ed Ackerson. Antenna was influenced by fIREHOSE and Cracker.

== Critical reception ==
Professional ratings
Review scores
Source	Rating
AllMusic	2/5 stars
Chicago Tribune	3/4 stars
Detroit Free Press	3/5 stars
MusicHound Rock: The Essential Album Guide	3/5 stars
Rolling Stone	3.5/5 stars

Rolling Stone called Hideout "a collection of tuneful compositions awash in a whirlpool of swirling sound," writing that "the moodily melodic 'Grey Street', which follows in the footsteps of Syd Barrett at his most coherent, lulls yet captivates with emotive vocal harmonies." Stereo Review deemed it a "determinedly neopsychedelic second album," praising the "marvelously textural guitar work by [John] Strohm." The Chicago Tribune admired Strohm's "ceaselessly inventive fretwork." Musician wrote that "it's the lush wall of guitar atmospherics that delivers satisfaction."

AllMusic thought that "some of the grittier songs on Hideout fall flat in 1993's storm of radio-friendly grunge, but the lighter, dreamier, and more pop songs add to the wealth of great indie music to come out of Boston around the turn of the decade." Trouser Press wrote that "the seething distortion of Hideout builds a loud, confident bridge to shoegazing sensuality ... Antenna radiates its tuneful shock waves, painting pretty pictures and peeling the canvas back at the same time." Surveying the album for a retrospective on Mammoth Records, Indy Week deemed Antenna "a pop band at heart, but its mind was filled with dreams of country music and walls of shoegaze sound that made for an alluring combination."

== Track listing ==
No.	Title	Length
1.	"Shine"	3:46
2.	"Wallpaper"	3:35
3.	"Stillife"	4:17
4.	"Rust"	3:07
5.	"Dreamy"	4:07
6.	"Don't Be Late"	3:32
7.	"Fade"	4:35
8.	"Easy Listening"	4:30
9.	"Danger Buggy"	3:53
10.	"Second Skin"	3:37
11.	"Halleluia"	3:51
12.	"Grey St."	3:43

== Personnel ==
- Ed Ackerson – guitars
- Jake Smith – bass
- Patrick Spurgeon – drums
- John Strohm – vocals, guitar
