= Earwig (Blake Babies album) =

1989 studio album by Blake Babies

Studio album by Blake Babies
- Released: 1989
- Recorded: March 1988 – July 1989
- Genre: Alternative rock
- Length: 39:39
- Label: Mammoth
- Producer: Gary Smith

Blake Babies chronology
Nicely, Nicely (1987)	Earwig (1989)	Sunburn (1990)

Earwig is the second album by the Blake Babies, released in 1989.

== Critical reception ==
Professional ratings
Review scores
Source	Rating
AllMusic	4/5 stars
The Encyclopedia of Popular Music	3/5 stars
MusicHound Rock: The Essential Album Guide	4/5 stars
The Rolling Stone Album Guide	3/5 stars
Spin Alternative Record Guide	7/10

Trouser Press called the album "consistently attractive textured guitar pop." The Rolling Stone Album Guide called it "a strong debut."

== Track listing ==
All songs written and composed by Juliana Hatfield except as noted.

1. "Cesspool" – 3:16 (Hatfield, John Strohm)
2. "Dead and Gone" – 3:47 (Hatfield, Strohm)
3. "Grateful" – 3:07
4. "You Don't Give Up" – 3:40
5. "Your Way or the Highway" – 2:42
6. "Rain" – 3:34 (Strohm)
7. "Lament" – 3:27 (Hatfield, Strohm)
8. "Alright" – 2:31
9. "Loose" – 2:49 (The Stooges)
10. "Take Your Head Off My Shoulder" – 1:26 (Hatfield, Strohm)
11. "From Here to Burma" – 2:03 (Hatfield, Strohm)
12. "Don't Suck My Breath" – 2:49
13. "Outta My Head" – 2:02
14. "Steamie Gregg" – 1:31
15. "Not Just a Wish" – 1:44

== Personnel ==
- Juliana Hatfield – vocals, bass and guitar
- John Strohm – guitar and vocals
- Freda Boner (also known as Freda Love) – drums
- Evan Dando – bass and backing vocals
- Andrew Mayer – bass

Production

- Producers: Gary Smith
- Engineers: Paul Q. Kolderie and Sean Slade
- Design: Lewis Lane
- Cover Art: Nicolette Nargesian
- Photography: Jen Wheeler
