= Benzel =

Benzel is a surname. Notable people with the surname include:

- Scott Benzel (born 1968), American visual and performance artist
- Terry Benzel (born 1956), American computer scientist
- Ulrich Benzel (1925–1999), German educator and folklorist
- Wolfgang Benzel (born 1967), German entrepreneur and author
