= Witch Doctor =

Witch Doctor may refer to:

- Witch doctor, a type of practitioner of traditional healing arts

== Music ==
- Witchdoctor (rapper), musician and member of Atlanta's Dungeon Family
- "Witch Doctor" (song), a 1958 song by Ross Bagdasarian a.k.a. David Seville
- Witch Doctor (album), a 1985 live album by Chet Baker
- Witchdoctor (album), a 1989 album by Sidewinders
- The Witch Doctor (album), a 1961 album by Art Blakey and the Jazz Messengers
- The Witch Doctor, a 1958 album by Ross Bagdasarian
- Witch Doctor, a 1979 album by Instant Funk
- "Witch Doktor", a 1994 song by Armand van Helden
- "Witchdoctor", a 2009 song by Clutch from the album Strange Cousins from the West

== Other uses ==
- Witch Doctor (comics), a horror/medical drama comic
- Witch Doctor (film), a 2016 Chinese-Thai film
- Witch doctor, a character class in Diablo 3
- Witch Doctor, a combat robot competing in BattleBots

== See also ==
- Dr. Bombay (character), a character from Bewitched
- "I'm Your Witchdoctor", a song by John Mayall
- The Witch Doctor Will See You Now, a television documentary series presented by Piers Gibbon
