= All Watched Over by Machines of Loving Grace (disambiguation) =

"All Watched Over by Machines of Loving Grace" is a 1967 poem by Richard Brautigan.

All Watched Over by Machines of Loving Grace may also refer to:

- All Watched Over by Machines of Loving Grace (poetry collection), a 1967 poetry collection by Richard Brautigan
- All Watched Over by Machines of Loving Grace (TV series), a 2011 British documentary series
- All Watched Over By Machines Of Loving Grace, a 2004 album by Brave Captain
- All Watched Over by Machines of Loving Grace, a 2016 album by Universal Thee

== See also ==
- Machines of Loving Grace (disambiguation)
