= Auntie Ramos' Pool Hall =

Studio album by Sidewinders
- Released: 1990
- Genre: Alternative rock
- Label: Mammoth/RCA
- Producer: Rich Hopkins, David Slutes

Sidewinders chronology
| 7 & 7 Is (1990) | Auntie Ramos' Pool Hall (1990) | The Sidewinders Sessions (1998) |

Auntie Ramos' Pool Hall is an album by the American band Sidewinders, released in 1990. It was the band's final album before a lawsuit forced them to change their name to the Sand Rubies.

The album's first single was "We Don't Do That Anymore", which peaked at No. 23 on Billboard's Modern Rock Tracks chart. Unlike the band's first Mammoth Records album, Witchdoctor, Auntie Ramos' Pool Hall did not make the Billboard 200.

== Production ==
The album was produced by band members Rich Hopkins and David Slutes. It was named after the band's practice space. Auntie Ramos' Pool Hall contains a cover of Love's "7 + 7 Is".

== Critical reception ==
Professional ratings
Review scores
| Source | Rating |
|---|---|
| AllMusic | 3/5 stars |
| Houston Chronicle | 4/4 stars |
| MusicHound Rock: The Essential Album Guide | 3/5 stars |
| The Rolling Stone Album Guide | 3/5 stars |

The Milwaukee Journal called the album "an impressive collection of rocking tunes driven by Hopkins' fervid guitar playing and vocalist Dave Slutes' passionate singing." Entertainment Weekly wrote that "songs, such as 'Get Out of That Town' and 'Sara's Not Sober', are set apart by their warmth as well as their subjects, which are elaborated by the Sidewinders in vivid detail... That combination seems to electrify the band's music, making it reach out with melodic curves as compelling as speech." The Capital Times opined that "'We Don't Do That Anymore' is one of the few rock songs willing to address adulthood in a way that doesn't sound like a longing for lost youth, and it sets the tone for the entire record."

Trouser Press concluded: "Hopkins' expansive 'big guitar' references Neil Young and Crazy Horse; his uncomplicated melodies are as immediate and hummable as Tom Petty's. And Slutes' enigmatic lyrical concerns (the drug of love, the mystic powers of the sun and moon, the dark edges of the soul)—delivered in the best romantic baritone since Neil Diamond ... make for a charismatic combination." The Houston Chronicle deemed the album "furious, straight-ahead, fearless rock 'n' roll," writing that the Sidewinders "still capture the brooding majesty of the Sonora desert, but simultaneously they have transcended Tucson and produced timeless rock 'n' roll." UPI praised the "big, blasting rock sound that begs to be played at top volume," and noted that the album is "anchored by the raging one-note guitar solos of Rich Hopkins."

Reviewing a packaging of the band's two Mammoth/RCA albums, No Depression determined that it "captured the zenith of a band that found common ground between roots-informed pop songcraft and punk-fueled emotional intensity, all hard-baked with a deep desert sunburn."

== Track listing ==
| No. | Title | Length |
|---|---|---|
| 1. | "We Don't Do That Anymore" |
| 2. | "Sara's Not Sober" |
| 3. | "Get Out of That Town" |
| 4. | "7 + 7 Is" |
| 5. | "Doesn't Anyone Believe" |
| 6. | "If I Can't Have You" |
| 7. | "Blood on Our Hands" |
| 8. | "Came On Like the Sun" |
| 9. | "Drop the Anchor" |
| 10. | "Little Boy" |
| 11. | "Can't Let Go" |
| 12. | "Last Night of Your Life" |
