= God Bless the Blake Babies =

God Bless The Blake Babies

Studio album by Blake Babies
- Released: March 6, 2001
- Recorded: Echo Park Studios
- Genre: Alternative rock
- Length: 43:29
- Label: Zoë Records, Fort Apache Studios
- Producer: Paul Mahern, Blake Babies

Blake Babies chronology
Innocence and Experience (1993)	God Bless The Blake Babies (2001)	Epilogue (2002)

God Bless The Blake Babies is the fourth full length album by the Blake Babies, released in 2001 (see 2001 in music). This album was recorded during the Blake Babies brief reunion.

Professional ratings
Review scores
Source	Rating
AllMusic	3/5 stars

== Track listing ==
CD
No.	Title	Writer(s)	Length
1.	"Disappear"	Juliana Hatfield, John Strohm	2:42
2.	"Nothing Ever Happens"	Freda Love Smith	3:09
3.	"Baby Gets High"	Billy Cote	4:09
4.	"Waiting For Heaven"	Hatfield	3:26
5.	"Until I Almost Died"	Hatfield, Strohm	2:55
6.	"Picture Perfect"	Strohm	4:01
7.	"When I See His Face"	F. Smith, Jake Smith	4:50
8.	"What Did I Do"	Hatfield	4:43
9.	"Brain Damage"	Evan Dando, Ben Lee	3:56
10.	"Civil War"	Hatfield	2:56
11.	"Invisible World"	Strohm	3:20
12.	"On"	Hatfield, Strohm	3:07
Total length:			43:14

== Personnel ==
- Juliana Hatfield - vocals, guitars, bass, piano and keyboards
- John Strohm - vocals, guitars, bass and keyboards
- Freda Love Smith - vocals and drums
- Evan Dando - bass, vocals and guitars
- Jake Smith - guitars, piano and background vocals
- Paul Mahern - programming

== Production ==
- Producer: Paul Mahern and Blake Babies
- Engineer: Mark Maher and Andy Snyder
- Mastering: Greg Calbi
