= Flipped Out in Singapore =

Studio album by Chainsaw Kittens
- Released: March 10, 1992
- Genre: Rock
- Length: 41:58
- Label: Mammoth
- Producer: Butch Vig

Chainsaw Kittens chronology
Violent Religion (1990)	Flipped Out in Singapore (1992)	Angel on the Range (EP) (1993)

Professional ratings
Review scores
Source	Rating
AllMusic	4/5 stars

Flipped Out in Singapore is the second album by the rock band Chainsaw Kittens, released in 1992.

== Recording ==
Flipped Out in Singapore was produced by Butch Vig at Smart Studios in Madison, Wisconsin, in 1992. Tyson Meade said:

We were about to start making our second record ... and the label wanted us to have Butch Vig produce it. We didn't know who he was because he hadn't done the Nirvana record yet. But we said we'd check him out. He was doing Gish at that point, and he got our first record, Violent Religion, in the mail and I guess he played it for Billy, and Billy totally loved it-'Oh Butch, you've got to do this band!'

== Track listing ==
All tracks written by Tyson Todd Meade, except where noted.

1. "Connie I've Found the Door" (Metzger, Meade, Bell, Preston) – 4:25
2. "High in High School" (Metzger, Meade, Bell) – 4:00
3. "2nd Theme/Flipped Out in Singapore" – 3:22
4. "My Friend Delirium" (Metzger, Meade, Bell, Preston, McBay) – 2:29
5. "She Gets" (Metzger, Meade, Bell, McBay) – 2:33
6. "Never to Be Found" – 4:09
7. "Shannon's Fellini Movie" (Metzger, Meade, Bell) – 4:38
8. "When You Shoot" – 4:03
9. "Hold" (Metzger, Meade, Bell) – 3:43
10. "Ezekial Walks Through Sodom and Gomorrah" – 3:34
11. "Angels Self Destruct" – 4:56

== Personnel ==
- Tyson Todd Meade – vocals
- Mark Metzger – guitar
- Trent Bell – guitar
- Clint McBay – bass
- Aaron Preston – drums

Credits

- Produced by Butch Vig
- Executive Producers: Jay Faires and Steve Balcom
- Recorded at Smart Studios, Madison, WI
- Engineered by Butch Vig and Doug Colson
- Mastered at Masterdisk by Howie Weinberg
- Backing vocals on "Flipped Out in Singapore" by Asa Miura

== Videos ==
The album's two lead tracks, "Connie, I've Found the Door" and "High in High School," saw release as music videos, directed by Phil Harder and Spike Jonze, respectively.
