= Violent Religion =

Studio album by Chainsaw Kittens
- Released: 1990
- Genre: Garage pop
- Length: 44:33
- Label: Mammoth
- Producer: Tyson Meade

Chainsaw Kittens chronology
Violent Religion (1990)	Flipped Out in Singapore (1992)

Violent Religion is the first album by the band Chainsaw Kittens, released in 1990.

"She's Gone Mad" was covered by the Flaming Lips.

== Critical reception ==
Professional ratings
Review scores
Source	Rating
AllMusic	3/5 stars
Chicago Tribune	3/4 stars

Newsday called the album "a masterpiece of garage pop".

== Track listing ==
All tracks written by Tyson Meade, except where noted.

1. "Bloodstorm" (Tyson Meade, Kevin McElhaney, Mark Metzger) – 2:08
2. "Skinned Knees (Kitten Theme)" – 1:41
3. "Boyfriend Song" – 4:00
4. "Mother (of the Ancient Birth)" – 3:46
5. "I'm Waiting (Leanne's Song)" (Tyson Meade, Mark Metzger) – 2:54
6. "Here at the End" – 3:46
7. "Bliss (We're Small)" (Tyson Meade, Mark Metzger) – 4:00
8. "Feel Like a Drugstore" – 3:56
9. "Savior Boyfriend Collides" – 4:23
10. "Violent Religion" – 4:36
11. "Death-Out at Party Central" (Tyson Meade, Kevin McElhaney, Mark Metzger) – 5:10
12. "She's Gone Mad" - 4:08

== Personnel ==
- Tyson Meade – vocals, guitar
- Mark Metzger – guitar
- Trent Bell – guitar
- Kevin McElhaney – bass
- Ted Leader – drums
- Ron Getman – piano
- Phil Seymour – background vocals

Credits

- Produced by Tyson Meade
- Executive Producers: Jay Faires and Steve Balcom
- Engineered by Robbie Egle, Ron Getman, Steve Ripley and Bill Nuñez
- Mastered by Russ Tolman
- Arranged by Ted Leader, Tyson Meade, Kevin McElhaney and Mark Metzger
