= Pop Heiress =

Studio album by Chainsaw Kittens
- Released: March 8, 1994
- Recorded: 1993
- Genre: Rock
- Length: 47:03
- Label: Mammoth/Atlantic
- Producer: John Agnello

Chainsaw Kittens chronology
Angel on the Range (EP) (1993)	Pop Heiress (1994)	Candy For You (EP) (1995)

Professional ratings
Review scores
Source	Rating
AllMusic	4.5/5 stars

Pop Heiress is the third album by the band Chainsaw Kittens, released in 1994.

== Recording ==
Pop Heiress was produced by John Agnello over five weeks at NRG Studios and Kiva West Studios in North Hollywood and Encino, Calif., respectively. According to Tyson Meade:

We practiced those songs a ton, so once we put them to tape, they were burning. We were having a fabulous time. We were on Atlantic Records making a big budget record in Los Angeles At one point, John came to a session dressed as a pink bunny.

== Critical reception ==
Trouser Press wrote that "Pop Heiress is the Kittens’ finest album, thanks to a combination of strong hooks, masterful production (by John Agnello) and the confidence that goes with such assets." The Washington Post stated: "From the delirious drama of 'Dive Into the Sea' to the T. Rexy shuffle of 'I Ride Free' to the punky attack of 'Sore on the Floor' and 'Burn You Down,' this is the Kittens' most consistent outing."

== Track listing ==
1. "Sore on the Floor" – 3:11
2. "Loneliest China Place" – 3:22
3. "Pop Heiress Dies" – 3:49
4. "Closet Song" – 2:37
5. "Dive Into the Sea" – 5:54
6. "Burn You Down" – 2:31
7. "I Ride Free" – 4:30
8. "Silver Millionaire" – 2:54
9. "Media Star Hymn" – 3:27
10. "Soldier on My Shoulder" – 4:18
11. "Justine Find Heaven" – 4:27
12. "We're Like..." – 6:01

== Personnel ==
- Tyson Meade – vocals, guitar
- Trent Bell – guitar
- Matt Johnson – bass
- Eric Harmon – drums
