= Leaving It All Behind =

Studio album by the Grass Roots
- Released: November 1969
- Recorded: 1969
- Studios: United Western, Hollywood, California
- Genre: Pop rock
- Label: Dunhill
- Producer: Steve Barri

The Grass Roots chronology
Lovin' Things (1969)	Leaving It All Behind (1969)	More Golden Grass (1970)

Professional ratings
Review scores
Source	Rating
AllMusic	2/5 stars

Leaving It All Behind is the fifth studio album by the American rock band the Grass Roots, released in November 1969 by Dunhill Records. Following the departure of Creed Bratton, who left in April 1969, seasoned musician Dennis Provisor joined the group, solidifying the new direction of the band. Terry Furlong and Brian Naughton became alternating touring guitarists for the group. In a return to grace for the group member composers, it contained six songs written by the group. The album was intended to move the group further in a soulful direction that was being rewarded by more charting singles. The A- and B-side singles released were "I'd Wait a Million Years", "Heaven Knows" b/w "Don't Remind Me", and "Walking Through The Country" b/w "Truck Drivin' Man". At the end of this run "Something's Comin' Over Me" was released as a B-side to "Come On And Say It", a charting single written by the group that appeared on the band's next compilation album, More Golden Grass. The album charted at No. 36, making it the group's highest-charting studio album.

== Songs ==
The songs featured unique horn-punctuated touches by arranger Sid Feller. However, Jimmie Haskell provided the arrangements for the songs "I'd Wait a Million Years" and "Heaven Knows." The group contributed heavily to this album, as for the first time since Feelings, the majority of songs were written or co-written by group members. Drummer Rick Coonce sang lead vocals on a self-penned song, "Truck Drivin' Man". The remainder of the songs were written by new outside composers and the competing songwriting duos of Price & Walsh and Lambert & Potter. Dunhill Records executives liked the established soulful direction and the group was rewarded with success in the charts and given more creative input for seeing it through.

== Artwork, packaging ==
The original release of Leaving It All Behind is on Dunhill ABC in stereo. The record came in a gatefold sleeve featuring photos of the band in concert, as well as a photo of the group posing with a pickup truck (the latter of which would later be used on the cover of 1971's gold-selling compilation Their 16 Greatest Hits). The front cover was designed by Gundelfinger/Schnepf, with photos taken by Tom Gundelfinger.

Original LP releases list the song "Hold on to What You Got" on the rear of the LP jacket; however, the song is not featured on the actual LP and to this day remains unreleased, although the CD release from 2004 even has a leaflet containing among others the lyrics of this lost song, crediting it to Warren Entner. It may be considered a lost recording due to parent company MCA "purging" all unnecessary media in the late 1970s.

== Track listing ==
All songs produced by Steve Barri.

Side one
No.	Title	Writer(s)	Lead vocals	Length
1.	"I'm Livin' for You Girl"	Harvey Price, Daniel Walsh	Grill	2:37
2.	"Back to Dreamin' Again"	Kenny Nolan	Grill	2:37
3.	"Out of this World"	Dennis Lambert, Brian Potter	Entner and Grill	2:45
4.	"Melinda Love"	Warren Entner, Rob Grill, Steve Barri	Grill and Provisor	2:34
5.	"Don't Remind Me"	Warren Entner	Entner	2:33
6.	"Take Him While You Can"	Dennis Provisor	Provisor	4:00

Side two
No.	Title	Writer(s)	Lead vocals	Length
1.	"Heaven Knows"	Harvey Price, Daniel Walsh	Grill	2:23
2.	"Walking Through the Country"	Dennis Provisor	Provisor	3:57
3.	"Something's Comin' Over Me"	Rob Grill	Grill	2:45
4.	"Truck Drivin' Man"	Rick Coonce	Coonce	2:59
5.	"Wait a Million Years"	Gary Zekley, Mitchell Bottler	Grill and Entner	3:19

Online Streaming Bonus Tracks
No.	Title	Writer(s)	Lead vocals	Length
12.	"Baby Hold On"	Harvey Price, Daniel Walsh	Grill	2:39
13.	"Come On and Say It"	Dennis Provisor, Warren Entner, Rob Grill	Grill	2:30
14.	"Temptation Eyes"	Harvey Price, Daniel Walsh	Grill	2:39

== Personnel ==
The Grass Roots

- Rob Grill – vocals, bass
- Warren Entner – guitar, vocals
- Rick Coonce – drums, percussion, vocals
- Dennis Provisor – keyboard instruments, vocals

Additional personnel

- Steve Barri – producer
- Phil Kaye – engineer
- Sid Feller – arrangements
- Jimmie Haskell – arrangements
- Session musicians – various instruments
