= The Bandit Queen =

Bandit Queen or The Bandit Queen may refer to:

== People ==
- Phoolan Devi (1963–2001), popularly known as "Bandit Queen", an Indian bandit chief and later politician
- Belle Starr (1848–1889), notorious American outlaw

== Film ==
- The Bandit Queen (film), a 1950 Western
- Bandit Queen, a 1994 film by Shekhar Kapoor on the life of Phoolan Devi

== Music ==
- Bandit Queen (band), 1990s indie rock band from Manchester, England
