= Gary Smith (music producer) =

American record producer (died 2023)

- Born: March 28, 1958
- Died: January 16, 2023 (aged 64)
- Occupations: Businessman, record producer, artist manager

Gary Smith (March 28, 1958 – January 16, 2023) was an American businessman, record producer, and artist's manager, known for his work recording albums by alternative rock musicians since the mid-1980s at Fort Apache Studios. Smith, who was sole owner of the studio, first became a partner co-owning the studio business in the late 1980s, moving it from Cambridge, Massachusetts, to Bellows Falls, Vermont, in 2002.

A Rhode Island native, Smith gave supportive early guidance to Newport, Rhode Island's Throwing Muses group, advising them to move to Boston's burgeoning alternative music scene in 1986. That year he saw a new band called the Pixies opening for Throwing Muses at The Rat in Boston and convinced them to let him produce their first demos, known as The Purple Tape, in spring 1987 at an early incarnation of Fort Apache's studio digs, then a "ramshackle" building in a dangerous neighborhood. Since joining Fort Apache in the mid-1980s, Smith produced dozens of influential recordings, including the Pixies' Come On Pilgrim EP on the 4AD and Rough Trade Records labels. Other artists he produced include Throwing Muses, Tanya Donelly, Blake Babies, The Connells, Juliana Hatfield, Scrawl, 10,000 Maniacs, and Billy Bragg.

Smith resided in New Hampshire across the border from his Vermont studio. There, Smith founded WOOL-FM, a community radio station, launched a regional events magazine, opened Popolo, an Italian-inspired, farm-to-table restaurant, and worked as a manager, representing entertainers including Tanya Donelly and Natalie Merchant.

Smith died on January 16, 2023 after suffering from cancer since September 2022.

== Production discography ==
- Pixies – Come On Pilgrim (September 1987)
- Throwing Muses – House Tornado (March 1988)
- Throwing Muses – Hunkpapa (January 1989)
- Blake Babies – Earwig (1989)
- The Connells – Fun & Games (1990)
- The Chills – Submarine Bells (1990)
- Blake Babies – Sunburn (1990)
- Blake Babies – Rosy Jack World EP (1991)
- The Feelies – Time for a Witness (March 1991)
- Juliana Hatfield – Hey Babe (March 1992)
