= More Golden Grass =

Compilation album by the Grass Roots
- Released: September 1970
- Genres: Pop rock, rock
- Label: Dunhill
- Producer: Steve Barri with assistance from The Grass Roots

The Grass Roots chronology
Leaving It All Behind (1969)	More Golden Grass (1970)	Their 16 Greatest Hits (1971)

Professional ratings
Review scores
Source	Rating
Allmusic	3.5/5 stars

More Golden Grass is the second compilation album by the American rock band the Grass Roots, released in September 1970 by Dunhill Records. It includes the No. 15 charting single "Temptation Eyes", the No. 61 charting single "Come On And Say It", and the No. 35 charting single "Baby Hold On". The album charted at No. 152.

== Songs ==
The songs featured unique touches by arrangers Jimmie Haskell and Sid Feller. The songs reflected the group's soulful re-direction by Dunhill and the three-part harmony of the primary vocalists Entner, Grill and Provisor. Five songs from the band's composers were included. This album highlights five hits from the prior two albums Lovin' Things and Leaving It All Behind, plus three hit singles issued during 1970. The remainder were B-sides from prior singles and two to be used on singles to be issued in 1971. Many of these songs were re-issued on their third compilation album titled Their 16 Greatest Hits that was released the next year. Their 16 Greatest Hits would showcase hits from all five of the group's studio albums in one package and stay in print longer than any of their albums.

== Artwork, packaging ==
The original release of More Golden Grass is on Dunhill ABC in stereo. The front cover was designed by Cal Schenkel with photography by Ed Caraeff.

== Track listing ==
All songs produced by Steve Barri with assistance from the Grass Roots.

=== Side one ===
1. "Come On and Say It" (Provisor, Entner, Grill) – 2:37
2. "I Can Turn Off the Rain" (Provisor) – 3:09
3. "Heaven Knows" (Price, Walsh) – 2:23
4. "The River Is Wide" (Knight, Admire) – 2:30
5. "Let It Go" (Provisor) – 3:42
6. "I'd Wait a Million Years" (Bottler, Zekley) – 3:19

=== Side two ===
1. "Temptation Eyes" (Price, Walsh) – 2:40
2. "Walking Through the Country" (Provisor) – 3:57
3. "Lovin' Things" (Schroeck, Loring) – 2:40
4. "Get It Together" (Entner, Coonce, Provisor, Grill) – 2:16
5. "Baby Hold On" (Price, Walsh) – 2:42
6. "Keepin' Me Down" (Provisor) – 4:52

== Personnel ==
The Grass Roots

- Rob Grill – vocals, bass, composer
- Warren Entner – guitar, vocals, composer
- Dennis Provisor – piano, organ, vocals, composer
- Terry Furlong – lead guitar
- Rick Coonce – drums, percussion

Additional personnel

- Steve Barri – producer, composer
- Phil Kaye – engineer
- Jimmie Haskell – arrangements
- Sid Feller – arrangements
