= Jabberjaw: Good to the Last Drop =

Compilation album by Various Artists
- Released: August 23, 1994
- Genre: Alternative rock
- Length: 56:43
- Label: Mammoth

Jabberjaw: Good to the Last Drop is a compilation album released by Mammoth Records in 1994.

== Background ==
Jabberjaw was the name of a Los Angeles music venue located on Pico Boulevard. Jabberjaw: Good to the Last Drop was released as a benefit album for the music venue. In 1994, Michael Goldberg reported that the reason for the benefit album was because the venue was "due for some remodeling."

== Artwork ==
The front cover illustration is drawn by Los Angeles illustrator Coop, while the layout and graphic design is by Chris Eselgroth. Original album artwork prints of Jabberjaw are held in the Drawings and Prints Department of Cooper Hewitt, the Smithsonian National Design Museum in New York City.

== Reception ==
Jabberjaw was met with generally favorable reviews following its release in 1994; in the Austin American-Statesman, Marc Fort rated Jabberjaw with four stars out of five, calling the record "a must" and highlighting Hole's alternate version of the song "Rock Star", calling the record "worth the price with this song alone". In the San Francisco Chronicle, Michael Goldberg wrote that "although many compilation albums aren't particularly listenable, this one is a winner for fans of hardcore punk, noisy power pop, hard rock fans and the various styles that fall under the 'alternative' tag". Goldberg voiced some criticism when explaining that "there are a few bum tracks", but concluded that "the overwhelming riches on Good to the Last Drop are proof that the rock scene has never been healthier".

== Track listing ==
=== CD and digital track listing ===
No.	Title	Performed by	Length
1.	"Magattraction"	Girls Against Boys	3:24
2.	"Broken E Strings"	Unwound	3:14
3.	"Rock Star" (Alternate version)	Hole	2:37
4.	"Cleaning Woman"	Hammerhead	2:43
5.	"In a Cold Ass Fashion"	Beck	4:10
6.	"Total Weirdness"	Teenage Fanclub	3:17
7.	"Borax"	Slug	1:48
8.	"Narrow"	Chokebore	2:41
9.	"Charger"	Mule	2:53
10.	"Turned Out" (live)	Helmet	4:34
11.	"Jabberjammin'"	Southern Culture on the Skids	1:44
12.	"Rocky Mountain Rescue"	Karp	3:41
13.	"Chump II"	Jawbox	3:18
14.	"Little Girl"	Surgery	2:49
15.	"Blew"	Unsane	3:50
16.	"My Letters"	Seaweed	2:58
17.	"Buzzers and Bells"	Inch	1:55
18.	"Explain"	That Dog	1:53
19.	"Rich Kids"	Further	3:14

== See also ==
- Jabberjaw (music venue)
