= The Sidewinders =

American rock band

- Origin: Tucson, Arizona, United States
- Genres: Alternative rock Modern rock Desert rock
- Years active: 1985–1993, 1996–1999
- Labels: Mammoth Records; Atlas Records; Contingency Records; Polydor Records; RCA Records
- Past members: Rich Hopkins; David Slutes; Bruce Halper; Mark Perrodin; Andrea Curtis; Diane Padilla

The Sidewinders (later the Sand Rubies) was a rock band from Tucson, Arizona, who released two major-label albums and scored two radio hits in the US before a lawsuit forced a change of name. Another album was released on a major label but by that time the band had nearly broken up. Since then the band has reunited and dissolved several times.

== History ==
The Sidewinders formed in the spring of 1985 by guitarist Rich Hopkins and vocalist David Slutes. The group released its first record, Cuacha!, in 1988, and subsequently signed to RCA/Mammoth Records, where they released two full-length albums, 1989's Witchdoctor and 1990's Auntie Ramos' Pool Hall. Witchdoctor cracked the lower echelons of the Billboard 200 at No. 169, In 1990, Mammoth/RCA released a 7 track promo-only CD entitled Do Not Play This Disc - For Educational Purposes Only. On the strength of two modern rock radio hits; the band scored exposure on MTV and VH1 and embarked on a worldwide tour, but the band's career was soon sidelined due to legal problems. In 1991, a North Carolina band known as Sidewinders sued the group over the use of its name, and it took two years to sort out the proceedings and secure the release of their next album, now under the name Sand Rubies.

As the Sand Rubies, they released an album on Polydor/Atlas in 1993; at one point, Pearl Jam served as their opening act. However, due to attrition over the period of legal troubles, the rhythm section of the band had departed, and the Sand Rubies dissolved during a tour in 1993, just as two other Arizona rock bands, Gin Blossoms and The Refreshments, were attracting mainstream attention.

A few one-off shows were given in 1995 and 1996 before an official Sand Rubies reunion was announced in October 1996. A show at SXSW followed in 1997, as did a new album, Return of the Living Dead, in 1998. They were able to independently release a best-of collection of tracks from their major label years entitled The Sidewinders Sessions, and an all-covers album, Release the Hounds, ensued in 1999 along with a tour of Europe. The band broke up again, followed by short reunion stints in 2001-02 and 2006 to support renewed local touring and special rereleases. The band announced in 2011 that both the Sand Rubies and the Sidewinders would disband.

The band may have had a reunion appearance in mid-March 2013 in Austin, Texas, at SXSW at which Slutes, Hopkins, bassist Ken Andree were joined by Gene Ruley on guitar and George Duron (Dumptruck, Sally Crewe, Doug Gillard Electric) on drums.

== Members ==
- Rich Hopkins - Guitar
- Jonathan Frank - Drums
- David Slutes - Vocals
- Bruce Halper - Drums
- Mark Perrodin - Bass guitar
- Andrea Curtis - Drums
- Ken Andree - Bass guitar

== Discography ==
Sidewinders

- Cuacha! (San Jacinto Records), 1987; re-released twice
- Witchdoctor (Mammoth Records/RCA Records), 1989
- 7 & 7 Is EP (Mammoth/RCA), 1990
- Do Not Play This Disc - For Educational Purposes Only (Mammoth/RCA) (Promo-only, 1990, 7 tracks)
- Auntie Ramos' Pool Hall (Mammoth/RCA) 1990
- The Sidewinders Sessions (Contingency Records), 1998

Sand Rubies

- Goodbye EP (Polydor Records/Atlas Records), 1993
- Sand Rubies (Polydor Records/Atlas Records), 1993
- Sand Rubies Live (San Jacinto Records), 1996
- Return of the Living Dead (San Jacinto Records)/(Contingency Records), 1998
- Release the Hounds (San Jacinto Records)/(Contingency Records), 1999
- Goodbye: Live at Alte Malzerei (San Jacinto Records)/(Blue Rose Records), 2002
- Mas Cuacha (San Jacinto Records)/(Blue Rose Records), 2007

== Charting singles ==
Year	Title	Chart Positions	Album
Year	Title	US Modern Rock	Album
1989	"Witch Doctor"	18	Witchdoctor
1990	"We Don't Do That Anymore"	23	Auntie Ramos' Pool Hall
