= Antenna (band) =

American indie rock band

Antenna was an American indie rock band active from 1991 to 1994.

The group was put together in Bloomington, Indiana by John Strohm and Freda Love, who had previously played together in the group Blake Babies. After adding local musicians Jacob Smith and Vess Ruhtenberg to the lineup, they began recording some of the songs Strohm had written while a member of the Blake Babies. Their debut full-length followed on Mammoth Records not long afterwards.

After the departure of Ruhtenberg and Love, Patrick Spurgeon joined the group and an EP, Sleep, was released in 1992. The full-length Hideout followed in 1993, with Ed Ackerson filling in on second guitar for the departed Ruhtenberg. Love returned for the For Now EP, also issued in 1993, but it was the group's last before dissolving. Following the breakup, Love and Smith married, and Strohm formed Velo-Deluxe before moving on to a solo career later in the decade.

== Members ==
- John Strohm - guitar, vocals
- Freda Love - drums, vocals
- Jacob Smith - bass
- Vess Ruhtenberg - guitar
- Patrick Spurgeon - drums
- Ed Ackerson - guitar
- Paul Ditto - guitar

== Discography ==
- Sway (Mammoth Records, 1991)
- Sleep EP (Mammoth, 1992)
- Hideout (Mammoth, 1993)
- For Now EP (Mammoth, 1993)
