= Concentration (album) =

Studio album by Machines of Loving Grace
- Released: September 21, 1993
- Genre: Industrial rock
- Length: 74:39
- Label: Mammoth
- Producer: Roli Mosimann

Machines of Loving Grace chronology
Machines of Loving Grace (1991)	Concentration (1993)	Gilt (1995)

Singles from Concentration
- 1. "Butterfly Wings" Released: 1993; 2. "Acceleration" Released: 1993; 3. "Perfect Tan (Bikini Atoll)" Released: 1994; 4. "If I Should Explode" Released: 1994

Professional ratings
Review scores
Source	Rating
Allmusic	4/5 stars

Concentration is a music album by artists Machines of Loving Grace which was released in 1993. The song "Butterfly Wings" achieved moderate success and appeared on TV Series Due South and later the soundtrack to the film Punisher: War Zone.

== Track listing ==
All tracks by Machines of Loving Grace

1. "Perfect Tan (Bikini Atoll)" – 3:21
2. "Butterfly Wings" – 3:38
3. "Lilith/Eve" – 3:59
4. "Albert Speer" – 4:38
5. "Limiter" – 4:43
6. "If I Should Explode" – 5:08
7. "Shake" – 4:03
8. "Cheap" – 3:38
9. "Acceleration" – 3:22
10. "Ancestor Cult" – 3:46
11. "Content?" – 4:04
12. "Trigger for Happiness" (from 5:42 after the song has ended, a sample plays every few minutes until the track ends) – 30:12
