= Gilt (album) =

Studio album by Machines of Loving Grace
- Released: September 19, 1995
- Genres: Hard rock, industrial rock
- Label: Mammoth
- Producer: Sylvia Massy

Machines of Loving Grace chronology
Concentration (1993)	Gilt (1995)

Gilt is an album by Machines of Loving Grace, released in 1995. Unlike past albums, guitars play a far greater role in the sound of this release.

The cover image is based upon a photograph taken by Robert Wiles in 1947 of Evelyn McHale, who had leapt to her death from the observation deck of the Empire State Building.

== Critical reception ==
Professional ratings
Review scores
Source	Rating
AllMusic	4.5/5 stars

Trouser Press called Gilt "a garish noise-powered album less tiresomely dependent on keyboards than the first two." AllMusic wrote that "great production helps the rhythm hit you right in the chest, and what Gilt lacks in song variety, it makes up for in consistency of quality."

== Track listing ==
1. "Richest Junkie Still Alive" – 3:36 (Benzel/Fisher/Riendeau/Kupers)
2. "Kiss Destroyer" – 3:13 (Benzel/Fisher/Riendeau)
3. "Suicide King" – 4:04 (Benzel/Fisher/Riendeau)
4. "Animal Mass" – 4:32 (Benzel/Fisher/Riendeau/Kupers)
5. "The Soft Collision" – 4:50 (Benzel/Fisher/Riendeau/Kupers)
6. "Solar Temple" – 3:46 (Benzel/Fisher/Riendeau/Melchionda)
7. "Tryst" – 3:24 (Benzel/Fisher/Riendeau/Kupers)
8. "Casual Users" – 4:27 (Benzel/Fisher/Riendeau)
9. "Twofold Godhead" – 3:33 (Benzel/Fisher/Riendeau/Kupers)
10. "Last" – 3:46 (Benzel/Fisher/Riendeau/Kupers)
11. "Serpico" – 3:45 (Benzel/Fisher/Riendeau)
