= Jabberjaw (Los Angeles) =

Music venue and coffeehouse (1989–1997)

Coordinates: 34.047529°N 118.321595°W

Jabberjaw was a coffeehouse and music venue in Los Angeles, California known for its all-ages underground rock music shows. Located in Arlington Heights at 3711 Pico Blvd., it was established in 1989 by Gary Dent and Michelle Carr and closed in 1997.

== History ==
In its heyday, Jabberjaw hosted both local and traveling acts, including Weezer, that dog., Nirvana, Teenage Fanclub, Beck, Hole, Beastie Boys, Elliott Smith, The Gits and many others. In the mid-1990s, it released a series of four 7 inch vinyl EPs on Mammoth Records which were compiled onto a compilation CD in 1994. A second compilation CD was released in 1996. These compilations were released under the title Jabberjaw: Good To The Last Drop.

The club is the subject of the book It All Dies Anyway: L.A., Jabberjaw, and the End of an Era by Bryan Ray Turcotte, Michelle Carr, Gary P. Dent, Kevin Hanley, and Michael Quercio (Rizzoli, 2015). It is also mentioned in the song "Minneapolis", from that dog.'s 1997 album Retreat From The Sun.

== Discography ==
- "Jabberjaw No. 1" (7", Ltd) Mammoth Records (1994)
- "Jabberjaw No. 2" (7", Ltd) Mammoth Records (1994)
- "Jabberjaw No. 3" (7", Ltd) Mammoth Records (1994)
- "Jabberjaw No. 4" (7", Ltd) Mammoth Records (1994)
- Jabberjaw: Good To The Last Drop Mammoth Records (1994)
- Jabberjaw Vol. 2: Pure Sweet Hell Mammoth Records (1996)
