= Vanilla Trainwreck =

American indie rock band

- Origin: North Carolina, United States
- Genres: Indie rock
- Years active: 1988–1995
- Label: Mammoth Records
- Members: G K Elkins (vocals, guitar); Ken Bowers (guitar); Greg Eades (bass, vocals); Brian Quast (drums)

Vanilla Trainwreck is an indie rock group from Raleigh, North Carolina. It was active in the 1990s. They released three albums on Mammoth Records. The band members are still active in the Raleigh scene today, with singer/guitarist Greg Elkins now producing records and drummer Brian Quast playing in the reunited Polvo.

== Discography ==
- Santaclaustrophobia (1989)
- Sofa Livin' Dreamazine (1991)
- Sounding to Try Like You (1992)
- Mordecai (1994)
