= Nicely, Nicely =

Studio album by Blake Babies
- Released: 1987
- Genre: Alternative rock
- Length: 23:47
- Label: Chewbbud
- Producer: T.W. Li, Blake Babies

Blake Babies chronology
Nicely, Nicely (1987)	Earwig (1989)

Nicely, Nicely is the debut album by the Blake Babies, released in 1987. The band financed the album themselves.

== Critical reception ==
Professional ratings
Review scores
Source	Rating
AllMusic	2.5/5 stars
The Encyclopedia of Popular Music	3/5 stars
MusicHound Rock: The Essential Album Guide	2.5/5 stars
Spin Alternative Record Guide	6/10

Trouser Press praised the "tunefully presentable songs and the unsettling range of Hatfield’s all-over-the-place singing." The Rough Guide to Rock called the album "shambolic," writing that "it was clearly the sound of a band trying to find their way."

== Track listing ==
All songs written by the Blake Babies.

1. "Wipe It Up" – 2:57
2. "Her" – 2:16
3. "Tom and Bob" – 1:55
4. "A Sweet Burger LP" (Live) – 2:16
5. "Bye" (Live) – 3:14
6. "Let Them Eat Chewy Granola Bars" – 2:07
7. "Julius Fast Body" – 2:35
8. "Better 'n You" – 3:58
9. "Swill and the Cocaine Sluts" – 2:33

== Personnel ==
- Juliana Hatfield - vocals and guitar
- John Strohm - guitar and vocals
- Seth White - bass
- Freda Boner (also known as Freda Love) - drums

Production

- Producers: T.W. Li and Blake Babies
- Engineers: Tracy Chisholm
- Mixing: T.W. Li and Tracy Chisholm
- Artwork: Juliana Hatfield
