= Chainsaw Kittens =

American alternative rock band

- Origin: Norman, Oklahoma
- Genres: Alternative rock
- Years active: 1989–2000
- Labels: Mammoth; Atlantic; Echostatic; Spacebaby; Mercury; Scratchie; Four Alarm
- Members: Tyson Meade; Trent Bell; Matt Johnson; Eric Harmon
- Past members: Mark Metzger; Clint McBay; Aaron Preston; Kevin McElhaney; Ted Leader

The Chainsaw Kittens were a part of the American alternative rock scene, drawing from pop, glam rock, punk, new wave and British Invasion music. Their lyrics tackled such varied topics as religion, the Stonewall riots, Federico Fellini, Oklahoma, Erik Menendez, and Oscar Wilde.

Based in Norman, Oklahoma, its name a reference to the band members' youth and "chainsaw guitar sound", the Chainsaw Kittens were active from 1989 to 2000. Debuting with a sound described 1991 SPIN review as "The Smiths meet the New York Dolls meet the devil", the group gained attention with "thrift-store transvestism," which it abandoned when the look "started to overshadow the music." The band underwent several personnel changes, but maintained the presence of principal singer/songwriter Tyson Meade, previously of Norman alt-rock outfit Defenestration, and guitarist/producer Trent Bell.

Though the Kittens saw little commercial success during their period of activity, they have since won praise as "[a]rguably the best American band who never made it" in the 1990s heyday of alternative rock.

In the 1995 movie Empire Records, the character Mark, played by Ethan Embry, is wearing a "Chainsaw Kittens" t-shirt throughout the movie.

The band reunited for a performance at the Norman Music Festival in Norman, Oklahoma on April 26, 2008. The band reunited once more on September 8, 2017 to commemorate the 15th anniversary of the Norman music venue The Opolis.

On October 4, 2017, drummer Eric Harmon died from colon cancer at the age of 48.

== Discography ==
=== Albums ===
- Violent Religion (Mammoth, 1990)
- Flipped Out in Singapore (Mammoth, 1992)
- Pop Heiress (Atlantic/Mammoth, 1994)
- Chainsaw Kittens (Mercury/Scratchie, 1996)
- The All American (Four Alarm, 2000)

=== EPs ===
- High in High School (Mammoth, 1992)
- Angel on the Range (Mammoth, 1993)
- Candy for You (Scratchie, 1996)

=== Singles ===
- "Mother (of the Ancient Birth)" b/w "Death-Sex Rattletrap" (Mammoth Records, 1990, MR 0019, Blue Vinyl)
- "Lazy Little Dove" b/w "Extinction Stomp" (Echostatic/Spacebaby, 1995)
- "Grandaddy's Candy" b/w "Bones in My Teeth" (Scratchie, 1996)

=== Others ===
- Bug (2007 soundtrack) (Lionsgate, Sony / RED Distribution, 2007) - track No. 3 "She Gets"
- Hellraiser III: Hell On Earth (soundtrack) - track No. 11 "Waltzing With A Jaguar"
