= The All American (album) =

Studio album by Chainsaw Kittens
- Released: September 19, 2000
- Genre: Pop rock, alternative rock
- Length: 45:51
- Label: Four Alarm
- Producer: Trent Bell

Chainsaw Kittens chronology
Chainsaw Kittens (1996)	The All American (2000)

The All American is the sixth and final album by the American alternative band Chainsaw Kittens, released in 2000.

== Critical reception ==
AllMusic gave the album 4 and a half stars, calling it "as inspired and lovely as ever."

== Track listing ==
1. "Light" – 3:38
2. "All American Wiggle Wiggle" – 4:29
3. "International Me" – 2:52
4. "Calling from Space" – 4:21
5. "How Many Lightbulbs" – 3:28
6. "Shutdown" – 4:08
7. "Hedonist" – 2:44
8. "John Wayne" – 5:07
9. "Wedding" – 4:03
10. "Gleaming Soft White Teens" – 3:06
11. "The Treasure Is Love" – 5:14
12. "We Got the Beat / Nightclubbing" (Go-Go's / Iggy Pop cover) – 2:41

== Personnel ==
- Tyson Meade – vocals, guitar
- Trent Bell – guitar
- Matthew Johnson – bass
- Eric Harmon – drums
