= Witchdoctor (album) =

Studio album by Sidewinders
- Released: 1989
- Genre: Rock, indie pop
- Label: Mammoth/RCA
- Producer: Rich Hopkins, Dave Slutes

Sidewinders chronology
Cuacha! (1987)	Witchdoctor (1989)	7 & 7 Is (1990)

Witchdoctor is an album by the American band Sidewinders, released in 1989. It peaked at No. 169 on the Billboard 200, the first Mammoth Records album to make the chart. The title track peaked at No. 18 on Billboard's Modern Rock Tracks chart. Witchdoctor had sold around 75,000 copies by the end of the 1990s. The band supported the album by touring with Charlie Sexton and then Johnny Thunders. Shortly after the release of the album, Sidewinders were sued by a similarly named band and subsequently changed their name to Sand Rubies.

== Production ==
The album was produced by bandmembers Rich Hopkins and Dave Slutes, who also wrote most of the songs. Sidewinders began the album with Andrea Curtis on drums and vocals; when she became pregnant, Diane Padilla was brought in to finish the tracks. Curtis, who sang lead on "Love '88", later divorced Hopkins. "Solitary Man" is a cover of the Neil Diamond song. "Bad, Crazy Sun" is about immigrants dying in the desert while attempting a border crossing. "What She Said" is about the end of a relationship.

== Critical reception ==
Professional ratings
Review scores
Source	Rating
AllMusic	4.5/5 stars
Austin American-Statesman	3/5 stars
Chicago Tribune	3/4 stars
The Daily Tar Heel	4/5 stars
MusicHound Rock: The Essential Album Guide	4/5 stars
Rolling Stone	3/5 stars

The Chicago Tribune said that the album "is remarkable in the way it faithfully and unapologetically evokes a sense of time and place: the waning of the Reagan era in Tucson." The Ottawa Citizen stated that it "picks up on the spacious, guitar-rock sound of the debut effort Cuacha, but with sharper production, the guitars grind along even harder; the mood is darker, swirling like the shifting desert sands." The Washington Post opined that the "lean songs and rusty-can guitars, though hardly distinctive, are appealingly direct". Rolling Stone called Witchdoctor "a solid set of pop-rock voodoo" and "a textbook 'college radio' record".

In 2023, The Arizona Republic noted that the album "offset the jangling guitars that soon defined the Arizona sound with the swagger of classic garage-punk and a mesmerizing, psychedelic splendor that often suggested a cross between Neil Young in Crazy Horse mode and something closer to the Velvet Underground or the Dream Syndicate." AllMusic concluded that the "mix of indie pop with a country tinge was well ahead of its time, and Witchdoctor sounds as fresh today as the day it was recorded." Trouser Press said that "Hopkins' expansive 'big guitar' references Neil Young and Crazy Horse; his uncomplicated melodies are as immediate and hummable as Tom Petty's."

== Track listing ==
No.	Title	Length
1.	"Witchdoctor"
2.	"Cigarette"
3.	"Bad, Crazy Sun"
4.	"Love '88"
5.	"Solitary Man"
6.	"What Am I Supposed to Do?"
7.	"Tears Like Flesh"
8.	"Before Our Time"
9.	"What She Said"
10.	"Worlds Apart"
