= Scott Benzel =

American musician

- Born: 1968 (age 57–58); Scottsdale, Arizona
- Education: University of Arizona, BA 1995, California Institute of the Arts, M.F.A, 2001
- Known for: contemporary art, sculpture, photography, performance art, and video art.

Scott Benzel (born 1968) is an American visual artist, musician, performance artist, and composer. Benzel is a member of the faculty of the School of Art at California Institute of the Arts, Valencia, CA.

== Biography ==
Benzel was born in Scottsdale, Arizona, and raised in Las Vegas, Nevada. He graduated from the University of Arizona after undergraduate work at California Institute of the Arts. In 1998, Benzel returned to California Institute of the Arts and received his MFA in 2001. Benzel is a member of the faculty of the School of Art at California Institute of the Arts.

== Work ==
Benzel's work explores the processes and contradictions inherent in mass media systems of production, the development of collective cultural imaginations and identification, and mythologized cultural histories.

Benzel's work has been shown or performed at The J. Paul Getty Museum, Los Angeles, the Los Angeles County Museum of Art, The Hammer Museum, Los Angeles, The Contemporary Art Museum St. Louis, LAXART, Los Angeles, Maccarone, New York, Various Small Fires, Los Angeles, Blum & Poe, Los Angeles, Human Resources Los Angeles, the Bard Center for Curatorial Studies, the Museum of Contemporary Art, Los Angeles (in collaboration with Sam Durant and Tom Recchion), Performa 09, New York (in collaboration with Mike Kelley), Mandrake, Los Angeles, Art Basel, Miami, and Art Basel: Statements (in collaboration with Andrea Bowers).

Benzel collaborated with Mike Kelley on the scores and soundtracks to Kelley’s installations Day is Done at Gagosian Gallery, New York, Profondeurs Vertes at the Musée du Louvre, Paris, and Kelley and Michael Smith’s A Voyage of Growth and Discovery at the Sculpture Center, New York and West of Rome, Los Angeles. With Kelley, he composed and produced Judson Church Dances, a live performance of the music of Day is Done with Kelley at Judson Church for Performa 09, New York.

In a review of Benzel's exhibition Mindless Pleasures published in The Brooklyn Rail, writer Yxta Maya Murray asserts:

"Benzel's turn to augury speaks to the feelings of powerlessness we experience during tumultuous changes of fortune, [...] Benzel's show, with its difficult theories about the patterns that underlie pandemonium, makes us think about chaos that seems random but is determined, and is not just a theory, but also emerges from power and practice."

== Notable Performances ==
=== Mathesis and Mathematikoi, for string quartet, anvil, dancers, and telescope operator ===
Performed on the rotating deck of the 100 inch telescope at the Mt. Wilson Observatory, CA, part of Knowledges 2017

=== The Kouroi/The Society of Dilettanti, for string trio, experimental hardcore trio, voice, and live stream ===
Musical performance/lecture at the J. Paul Getty Museum, Los Angeles, 2017

=== Op. 21: Inner Experience Fellowship/Friends of Crime ===
Fitzpatrick/Leland House, MAK Center for Art and Architecture, Los Angeles

=== Split Chorale for Viljo Revell ===
Benzel collaborated with Kathryn Andrews on the performance for 300 choristers and video in Toronto City Hall, Toronto, ON, as part of Nuit Blanche, Toronto, 2014

=== (Threnody) A beginner’s guide to Mao Tse-Tung ===
Benzel was selected for inclusion in the first Los Angeles biennial, Made in L.A. 2012 at the Hammer Museum, 2012

=== Maldistribution ===
Benzel's solo show at Human Resources, Los Angeles, was selected by Artforum and Frieze magazines in their year-end Best of 2011 lists.

== Exhibitions ==
=== Selected Solo Exhibitions and Performances ===
2025 Psychomanteum Phase Gallery, Los Angeles

2024 Parallel Worlds: Scott Benzel Norman Klein Phase Gallery, Los Angeles

2023 Vestigia, The Horse Dublin Dublin, IE

2023 Forget the Labyrinth performance/lecture, Blum & Poe, Los Angeles, organized by Sarah Bay Gachot

2023 Degrade the Threads performance/lecture, REDCAT, Los Angeles, organized by Andrew Culp

2020 Mindless Pleasures Bel Ami, Los Angeles

2018 V.I.T.R.I.O.L. Los Angeles Contemporary Exhibitions, Los Angeles

2018 Torcat Tiqaucrat Mytics Ahtrae Acid Free, Blum and Poe, Los Angeles

2017 The Kouroi / The Society of Dilettanti J. Paul Getty Museum, Los Angeles

2017 Mathesis and Mathematikoi Mt. Wilson Observatory, CA, Knowledges 2017, curated by Christina Ondrus

2016 (Mayakovsky) for Instrumental Transcommunication, Voice, and Autotune Rainbow in Spanish, Los Angeles

2015 Op. 21: Inner Experience Fellowship/Friends of Crime MAK Center for Art and Architecture, Los Angeles

2015 Desert Center (Composition I10 Mvmt IV (Dusk)) Palm Springs Art Museum, Desert Center, CA

2014 Various Small Fires, Los Angeles

2014 Maccarone, New York

2013 LAAIR / The Traveller’s Companion Addenda Shanaynay, Paris

2012 The Academy / The Chthonic at Eleusis Public Fiction, Los Angeles

2012 (Threnody) A beginner’s guide to Mao Tse-Tung Made in LA 2012, Hammer Museum, Los Angeles

2011 Contemporary Art Museum St. Louis, Front Room

2011 Maldistribution Human Resources at Cottage Home, Los Angeles

2011 Concentric Circles (before and after David Smith) Los Angeles County Museum of Art, Los Angeles

=== Selected Group Exhibitions ===
2026 RTRU: Raudive Technocultural Research Unit Kaje, New York, curated by Elizaveta Schneiderman and Zane Oncule

2026 The Ultimate Zone of Unspeakable Horror California Institute of the Arts, Valencia, CA, organized by Mateo Alfonso, Jonas Hoehn, Frances Sheehy, and Colette Zighelboim

2025 1TB Verbatim: Los Angeles Timing 2013-2025 Gene’s Dispensary at Leroy’s Los Angeles, curated by Keith J. Varadi

2024 Madness of the Day Treignac Projet, Treignac, FR, curated by Sabrina Tarasoff

2024 Rare Earth Timeshare, Los Angeles

2023 Made in L.A. 2023 (as part of Los Angeles Contemporary Archive), The Hammer Museum, Los Angeles

2019 Garland Treignac Projet, Treignac, France, curated by Sabrina Tarasoff

2018 Home Bodies, Away Teams UMOCA Salt Lake City, UT, organized by Earl Gravy

2017 Ours is a City of Writers Los Angeles Municipal Gallery, selected by John Tain

2013 “Would you ever Write a Tract?” Autocenter, Berlin, curated by Marcel Dickhage and Daniel Horn

2013 In the Good Name of the Company For Your Art, Los Angeles, curated by Jan Tumlir, Brian Roettinger, Christopher Michlig

2012 An Homage to Mike Kelley presented by Gagosian Gallery, MOMA PS1, New York

2012 Venice Beach Biennial with Mark Hagen, curated by Ali Subotnick, Venice, CA

2010 Endless Bummer/Surf Elsewhere Blum and Poe, Los Angeles, curated by Drew Heitzler

=== Selected Collaborations ===
2014 Split Chorale for Viljo Revell with Kathryn Andrews, Nuit Blanche, Toronto, CN

2013 Part-Objects with Anita Pace, Perform Chinatown, Los Angeles

2012 A|D with Liz Glynn, also with Corey Fogel, Giles Miller, Public Fiction, Los Angeles

2009 Judson Church Horse Dances Co-composer, Producer, with Mike Kelley, Performa 09, New York

2009 Destroy All Monsters at ”A Fantastic World Superimposed on Reality” Gramercy Theatre, Performa 09, New York

2009 A Voyage of Growth and Discovery Original Score Co-composer with Mike Kelley, Sculpture Center, New York

2006 Profondeurs Vertes Original Score Co-Composer with Mike Kelley, Musee Louvre, Paris

2005 Day is Done Original Score Co-Composer with Mike Kelley, Gagosian, New York

2004 Destroy All Monsters at ”All Tomorrow’s Parties” curated by Jake and Dinos Chapman, Camber Sands, UK

2001 Democracy’s Body Original Score Composer for Andrea Bowers exhibition, Art Basel Statements, Basel, Switzerland

== Musical work ==
Benzel's performances often incorporate live musicians performing his original compositions. Since 2017, he has been employing limited AI, Machine Learning, and generative algorithmic platforms as part of the composition process. Live performances of compositions include Torcat Tiqaucrat Mytics Ahtrae Blum and Poe, Los Angeles, 2018, Mathesis and Mathematikoi, for string quartet, anvil, dancers, and telescope operator, at the Mt. Wilson Observatory, Knowledges 2017,The Kouroi/The Society of Dilettani, for string trio, experimental punk trio, voice, and live stream, at the J. Paul Getty Museum, Los Angeles, 2017, Op. 21: Inner Experience Fellowship/Friends of Crime, at the MAK Center for Art and Architecture, Los Angeles, 2015, Desert Center (Composition I10 Mvmt IV (Dusk)), at the Palm Springs Art Museum, Palm Springs, CA, and Desert Center, CA, 2015, and Split Chorale for Viljo Revell for 300 voices, at Toronto City Hall, Nuit Blanche, Toronto, ON, 2014

Musical projects have included Destroy All Monsters, the band led by American artist Mike Kelley, and Machines of Loving Grace.

In 2009, Benzel released Blak Bloc, a composition for string quartet and guitar feedback and synthesizer, chosen by Artforum magazine as a Best of 2009: Music.

In addition to production and remix work with The Red Krayola, Destroy All Monsters, Jon Spencer Blues Explosion, Lucinda Williams, Boss Hog, and various others, Benzel has produced albums for Fat Possum Records and Plug Research in Los Angeles.

== Curatorial ==
In 2019 Benzel organized Hoard Inaugural at Los Angeles Contemporary Archive, featuring works by Anonymous, Autonomous Oral History Group, Kelman Duran, Arshia Haq, Nick Kochornswasdi, Halldora Miyoko Magnusdottir, Olivia Mole, Misael Oquendo, Rapterotica/Cephalerotica Index, Hande Sever, Alan Tofighi, and Adam Wand. According to the press release, Hoard Inaugural’s works function on a vector divorced from the model of the standardized, refined index or ‘complete’ artwork. They are works and collections that tarry with the hoard and sometimes succumb. The works suggest the possibility of endless conjugation and the impossibility of final categorization, they contain evidence of digging, of obsession, and in some cases unresolvable moral quandaries. In 2015, Benzel organized Sonatine Bureaucratique at Los Angeles Contemporary Archive. According to the press release, The show features found and archived material from seemingly disparate spheres presented in conjunction to illuminate how the works of certain conceptual artists ultimately prefigured contemporary systems that have become thoroughly aligned with an administration of social control. Including original catalogs and artist’s books by Guy De Cointet, Charles Gaines, Douglas Huebler, and Seth Siegelaub.

In 2012 Benzel curated (in conjunction with SASSAS) Welcome Inn Time Machine, part of the Pacific Standard Time Performance Festival and, in 2013, Tape Music: .sound at the Schindler House. Both shows presented historical and contemporary experimental musical works in unusual settings.

In 2011 Benzel organized Sublimated Los Angeles: a film series highlighting little-seen films with strong ties to Los Angeles and suppressed for a variety of reasons, including: Play it as it Lays (1972), Let there be light (1946), Dial M for Murder in 3D (1954), Pumping Iron (1977) at Fellows of Contemporary Art, Los Angeles. In 2011, Benzel curated Seven Los Angeles Artists featuring artists Kathryn Andrews, Anonymous, Anonymous, Erin Cosgrove, Mark Hagen, Mike Kelley, and Rodney McMillian, at Fellows of Contemporary Art, Los Angeles from Oct.15-Dec.17

== Teaching ==
Benzel is a member of the faculty of the School of Art at California Institute of the Arts, Valencia, CA. He previously taught at the University of California Riverside, Riverside, CA, and California State University, Long Beach, Long Beach, CA.

Benzel has lectured and taught seminars at Escuela Incierta, Cali, Colombia, 2018, Claremont College, Claremont, CA, 2014, and University of Southern California, Los Angeles, CA, 2012
