= Universal Thee =

Universal Thee is a five-piece Indie-slacker-rock band from Edinburgh formed in 2010 consisting of James Russell, Lisa Russell, Robin Spivey, Andrew Perrie, and Matt Grieve. The band is signed through the Eventual Heirs label and released their debut album Back To Earth in 2014. In March 2014 the band completed their first headline tour of Scotland. The band released the single "Speaker" and accompanying video in January 2016. Their 2nd album All Watched Over by Machines of Loving Grace was released on 19 February 2016.

== Band members ==
- James Russell (Vocals & Guitar)
- Lisa Russell (Vocals)
- Robin Spivey (Guitar)
- Andrew Perrie (Bass)
- Albie Clark (Drummer)
- Matt Grieve (Previous drummer)
- Kevin Haddow (Previous drummer)

== Discography ==
=== Singles ===
- "Aranis Natas" (released January 2014 on Eventual Heirs Records)
- "Speaker" (released 22 January 2016 on Eventual Heirs Records)

=== Studio albums ===
- Back To Earth (Released March 2014 on Eventual Heirs Records)
- All Watched Over by Machines of Loving Grace (Released February 2016 on Eventual Heirs Records)
