= Blake Babies =

American college rock band

- Blake Babies, c. 1990. From left: Freda Love, John Strohm, Juliana Hatfield

Background information
- Origin: Boston, Massachusetts, United States
- Genres: Alternative rock
- Years active: 1986–1991, 1999–2001, 2016
- Label: Mammoth
- Past members: John Strohm; Freda Love; Juliana Hatfield
- Website: blakebabies.com

Blake Babies were an American college rock band formed in 1986 in Boston, Massachusetts. The three primary members were Freda Love, Juliana Hatfield and John Strohm. They recorded three albums before splitting up in 1991. They reunited in 1999 to record the album God Bless the Blake Babies, released in 2001, and reunited again in 2016 for several live shows in connection with the release of the archival collection Earwig Demos.

== History ==
The band formed in 1986, while Hatfield was studying at Berklee College of Music. The name "Blake Babies" was provided by the poet Allen Ginsberg; following a reading at Harvard University, the group (which had just begun to play together) raised their hands and asked him to name their band. Their first release was the Nicely, Nicely album, released on their own Chewbud label in 1987.

In 1989 they released the mini-LP Slow Learner on Billy Bragg's Utility label, with Evan Dando of the Lemonheads (with whom Strohm previously played) joining as a temporary bassist. The band then signed to the then-independent North Carolina–based record label Mammoth Records, which issued Earwig in 1989 and Sunburn in 1990, the latter described by Allmusic as "the last great college rock album". Their final UK tour included several sold-out shows, and the band looked on the verge of a breakthrough, but they went on hiatus in 1991, with the Rosy Jack World EP released in June and Hatfield rumored to be on the brink of signing with a major label as a solo artist. The band's split was finally confirmed in early 1992.

The Blake Babies toured the United States and Europe, eventually achieving a moderate amount of notice, particularly among listeners of college age who were appreciative of the group's "intelligent" brand of rock music. The band's music received little airplay on commercial radio, instead being played primarily on college radio stations.

Andrew Mayer, Seth White, Anthony DeLuca (who played drums in place of Freda for the group's last European tour in early 1992), and Mike Leahy each also performed as members of the band at times.

Strohm and Love continued to perform together in the Indiana-based group Antenna.

The group reunited in late 1999 to record a new album, performing a few shows in 1999 and 2000 and embarking on one last US tour in 2001. The result of these recording sessions, God Bless the Blake Babies, was released in 2001 by Rounder Records.

Hatfield and Love joined up again in 2003 in the band Some Girls along with fellow musician Heidi Gluck.

In March 2016, the band announced that an album of demos recorded in March 1988 would be released (Earwig Demos), and they reunited again for three live shows that year.

== Musical style ==
The group were compared to R.E.M., Throwing Muses and the Lemonheads. The Washington Post'' described them as "punkish folk-rock". AllMusic characterized their sound as employing "thin, girlish singing", while noting the band's tendency to "branch out into both punkier and folkier territories on each record."

== Discography ==
=== Albums ===
==== Studio albums ====
Year	Album details
1987	Nicely, Nicely: Mini-album; Released: 1987; Label: Chewbud Records
1989	Slow Learner: Mini-album; Released: July, 1989; Label: Utility Records
1989	Earwig: Released: 1989; Label: Mammoth Records
1990	Sunburn: Released: October, 1990; Label: Mammoth Records
2001	God Bless the Blake Babies: Released: March 6, 2001; Label: Zoë Records

==== Compilation albums ====
Year	Album details
1993	Innocence & Experience: Released: October 12, 1993; Label: Mammoth Records
2016	Earwig Demos 6–7 March 1988: Released: 2016; Label: Chewbud Records

=== Extended plays ===
Year	EP details
1991	Rosy Jack World: Released: June, 1991; Label: Mammoth Records
2002	Epilogue: Released: 2001; Label: Ye Olde Records

=== Singles ===
Year	Title	Album	B-Sides
1989	"Cesspool"	Earwig	
1990	"Lament"	Earwig	"Cesspool" & "Loose"
1990	"Out There"	Sunburn	
1991	"Temptation Eyes"	Innocence & Experience	
1991	"Take Me"	Innocence & Experience	
2001	"Nothing Ever Happens"	God Bless the Blake Babies	

=== DVD ===
- Blake Babies (2016)
