= Machines of Loving Grace (album) =

Studio album by Machines of Loving Grace
- Released: 1991
- Genres: Industrial rock, dance rock, techno pop
- Label: Mammoth

Machines of Loving Grace chronology
Machines of Loving Grace (1991)	Concentration (1993)

Machines of Loving Grace is an album by the American band Machines of Loving Grace, released in 1991. The opening track contains a sample from Devo's 1981 single "Through Being Cool". The band supported the album by touring with Swans.

== Critical reception ==
Professional ratings
Review scores
Source	Rating
AllMusic	2/5 stars

The St. Petersburg Times wrote: "Although the harsh reality of industrial dance music runs amok in 'Burn Like Brilliant Trash (At Jackie's Funeral)', 'Cicciolina', which follows, is gentle, as close to balladry as tech-heads have ever roamed." The Washington Post deemed the band "a synth-based trio that occasionally approximates a hip-hop swing but often sounds like one of those British electro-dance combos of a decade ago." The Oregonian opined that "the group veers from cluttered industrial noise constructs (akin to Skinny Puppy, though milder) to glossy, if eccentric, dance-rock."

AllMusic wrote that "Pretty Hate Machine-style synths are scattered liberally across the album, but the most part it's surprisingly calm and restrained."

== Track listing ==
All tracks by Machines of Loving Grace

1. "Burn Like Brilliant Trash (At Jackie's Funeral)" – 3:12
2. "Cicciolina" - 5:27
3. "Rite of Shiva" - 4:04
4. "Lipstick 66" - 4:53
5. "X-Insurrection" – 3:56
6. "Content" - 3:53
7. "Weather Man" - 3:51
8. "Terminal City" - 3:34
9. "Number Nine" - 1:50
