= Machines of Loving Grace =

American industrial rock band

Background information
- Origin: Tucson, Arizona, U.S.
- Genres: Industrial rock, industrial metal, alternative rock, funk rock (early)
- Years active: 1989–1999
- Labels: Mammoth, Atlantic

Machines of Loving Grace was an American industrial rock band from Tucson, Arizona, formed in 1989 by vocalist Scott Benzel, keyboardist Mike Fisher, and guitarist Stuart Kupers. The band released three albums in the 1990s before disbanding in 1999.

== History ==
=== Formation, Machines of Loving Grace, and label signing (1989–1992) ===
In 1989, vocalist Scott Benzel recruited guitarist Stuart Kupers and keyboardist Mike Fisher to work on music for a film project. All three attended the University of Arizona together. The result was the track "Terminal City". Pleased with the song, the trio continued to work together, and formed a band named Machines of Loving Grace. The name came from the Richard Brautigan poem "All Watched Over by Machines of Loving Grace". During recording, the band brought in drummer Brad Kemp and bassist Andrew Stewart to record on one track ("Lipstick 66").

The band circulated the songs as a self-produced demo. In 1991, Mammoth Records signed the band to a label contract based on the demo; however, instead of allowing the band to record a proper album, the label released the demo as their debut album with minimal changes under the name Machines of Loving Grace in October 1991. The band protested the decision but ultimately relented. Around the same time, Kemp and Stewart joined the band on drums and bass respectively. Despite landing a deal with a label, the band did not play their first live show until later on in 1991 as they opened for Pigface in Hollywood, California. Machines of Loving Grace then went on their first major tour in the US alongside Swans and also Peter Murphy.

To promote Machines of Loving Grace, "X-Insurrection" was released as a video and "Rite of Shiva" was released as a single. During a chance encounter in Arizona through a mutual friend, the band met Trent Reznor of Nine Inch Nails. He offered to collaborate with the band. Along with Brian Liesegang, they created a remix for the Machines of Loving Grace track "Burn Like Brilliant Trash". The remixed version, with a "radio edit" subtitle, was released as a single in 1992. Due to legal troubles with Reznor's label, the single was not heavily promoted nor was a video made for it.

=== Concentration and mainstream exposure (1993–1994) ===
In 1993, Machines of Loving Grace entered the studio with producer Roli Mosimann (who had previously worked with bands such as New Order and The The). During the recording process, Stewart departed from the band but still contributed additional bass to the album. The band wrote over 20 songs for the album, and were more motivated due to the fact that their first album was essentially released without any alterations. The band released their second album titled Concentration in September 1993. It received wider distribution than their self-titled album due to a deal with Atlantic Records. "Butterfly Wings" was the lead single and it peaked at No. 13 on the Modern Rock Tracks chart. Promotional singles for "Perfect Tan (Bikini Atoll)", "If I Should Explode", and "Acceleration" were released as well. For the tour in support of Concentration, the band added Ray Riendeau to the lineup as bassist. Along with various headlining shows, they also opened for My Life With the Thrill Kill Kult towards the end of the year.

In early 1994, Machines of Loving Grace went on tour with Course of Empire to promote Concentration. That same year, Machines of Loving Grace contributed the song "Golgotha Tenement Blues" to the soundtrack of The Crow. It was also released as a standalone single. They were involved with the film early on since they were the first band contacted for the soundtrack. Ultimately, the soundtrack peaked at No. 1 on the Billboard 200 chart and went on to receive multiple sales certifications from the US, Australia, Canada, and the UK. Also in 1994, "Butterfly Wings" appeared in an episode of the show Due South.

=== Gilt, disbandment, and The Machines project (1995–1999) ===
In 1995, Kemp departed from the band. The remaining four members then started work on their third album with Sylvia Massy (who had previously worked with bands such as Green Jellö and Tool) as producer. Influenced by the extensive touring behind Concentration, the band opted for a rawer sound more akin to a live setting for their third album. During the recording process, Kupers left the band. The lineup was then expanded with Tom Coffeen (previously a member of Beats the Hell Out of Me) on guitars and David Suycott (previously a member of Stabbing Westward) on drums. The result was Gilt (initially called Gilt After Tris), released in September 1995. Around the same time, a slight remix of the Gilt track "Richest Junkie Still Alive" appeared on the soundtrack to the film Hackers. Both the remix version and the original version were released as singles. Shortly after the release of Gilt, Coffeen was replaced on guitars by Greg Suran. In late 1995, Machines of Loving Grace opened for Jim Rose Circus. From the end of 1995 to the beginning of 1996, Machines of Loving Grace toured alongside Korn, Grotus, and Chemlab throughout the US. Later on in 1996, "Tryst" (off of Gilt) appeared on the soundtrack to Mega Man (a TV show adaption).

After the touring cycle for Gilt ended, Suran departed from the band, and he was replaced by Tom Melchionda (a friend of the band who had previously co-written "Golgotha Tenement Blues" from The Crow and also served as the band's guitar tech). The lineup of Benzel, Fisher, Suycott, Riendeau, and Melchionda then commenced recording the band's fourth album. It was given the working title of Love Scenes at the Slave Market. In 1997, "Richest Junkie Still Alive" appeared on a compilation which promoted the European release of the video game Command & Conquer: Red Alert.

Throughout 1997 and 1998, the band members gradually moved away from Love Scenes at the Slave Market. Riendeau joined the band 2wo as a touring bassist, Suycott focused on session work for a wide variety of artists such as Verbow and Butterfly Child, and Benzel shifted towards technical work for other artists. By the beginning of 1999, Machines of Loving Grace had effectively disbanded. Benzel, however, started a project simply named The Machines. The band's sound was changed into a beat-oriented electronic direction. Ben Grosse, Jim Waters, and Jack Dangers were working on the untitled album as well. Song names mentioned included "Superfuck", "Transgression", and "Never Learn Not to Love" (a Beach Boys cover). Unfortunately for the band, their label (Mammoth Records) went through a transition as they were purchased by The Walt Disney Company. Due to the restructuring, Benzel halted The Machines project by 2000.

=== Post-breakup (2000–present) ===
Three songs from the band's album Concentration appeared in the 2005 film Devour. In 2007, Machines of Loving Grace was included in the documentary High and Dry: 20 Years of Tucson Music, which revolved around the music scene of Tucson, Arizona. In 2008, "Butterfly Wings" (from Concentration) was featured on the soundtrack of the film Punisher: War Zone. Original guitarist Kupers died at the age of 54 on November 14, 2021. He had ultimately died from both Gaucher's disease and Parkinson's disease.

== Members ==
- Scott Benzel – vocals (1989–1999)
- Mike Fisher – keyboards, programming (1989–1999)
- Stuart Kupers – guitars, bass (1989–1995); died 2021
- Brad Kemp – drums (1991–1995)
- Andrew Stewart – bass (1991–1993)
- Ray Riendeau – bass (1993–1999)
- David Suycott – drums (1995–1999)
- Tom Coffeen – guitars (1995)
- Greg Suran – guitars (1995–1996)
- Tom Melchionda – guitars (1996–1999)

=== Timeline ===
Color denotes main live duty.

== Discography ==
=== Albums ===
- Machines of Loving Grace (1991)
- Concentration (1993)
- Gilt (1995)

=== Singles ===
Year	Single	US Alt	Album
1991	"X-Insurrection"	—	Machines of Loving Grace
1991	"Rite of Shiva"	—	Machines of Loving Grace
1992	"Burn Like Brilliant Trash"	—	Machines of Loving Grace
1993	"Butterfly Wings"	13	Concentration
1993	"Acceleration"	—	Concentration
1994	"Perfect Tan (Bikini Atoll)"	—	Concentration
1994	"If I Should Explode"	—	Concentration
1994	"Golgotha Tenement Blues"	—	The Crow Original Soundtrack
1995	"Richest Junkie Still Alive"	—	Gilt
1995	"Suicide King"	—	Gilt

=== Music videos ===
- "X-Insurrection"
  - Directed by Kevin Borque
- "Butterfly Wings"
  - Directed by Julie Hermelin
- "Perfect Tan (Bikini Atoll)"
  - Directed by Julie Hermelin
- "Golgotha Tenement Blues"
- "Richest Junkie Still Alive"
  - Directed by John Reece
