= Terry Benzel =

American computer scientist

Terry C. Vickers Benzel (born 1956) is an American computer scientist specializing in experimental testbeds for computer security research. She works at the Information Sciences Institute of the University of Southern California, as director of its Networking and Cybersecurity Division. She is also affiliated with the USC Marshall School of Business as a research scientist.

== Education and career ==
Benzel was born on November 17, 1956, in Lansing, Michigan, where her father was a master's student. Her parents divorced, and she moved frequently as a child; she discovered an interest in mathematics as a sixth-grade student in Laytonville, California, where her mother was living in a commune. She went to high school in Laguna Beach, California and Palo Alto, California, and studied mathematics as an undergraduate at Foothill College and the University of California, Santa Cruz before transferring to Boston University in a combined bachelor's/master's program in mathematics. She credits Boston University professor Harvey Deitel with beginning her shift in interests from mathematics to computer science.

As a high school student in Palo Alto, in around 1973, Benzel worked at the NASA Ames Research Center, and while at Boston University, she began working for the Draper Laboratory in Boston, initially as a computer programmer and later working on parallel image recognition algorithms. She applied to continue at Boston University for a Ph.D., and enrolled in the program, but eventually stopped out with just the master's degree. While in the doctoral program, she learned about recent research in mathematical methods in computer security through a graduate seminar. Excited by this discovery, she obtained a position at the Mitre Corporation, where this work was authored, through a friend of her fiancé, beginning her work there in 1982 on the Secure Communications Processor (SCOMP).

In 1988, she moved from Mitre to become a principal computer scientist at Trusted Information Systems in Los Angeles, performing defense and intelligence consulting work in computer security. Later she became director of the Los Angeles office of Trusted Information Systems, and earned an MBA, from the University of California, Los Angeles. By the late 1990s, her work there shifted more towards corporate computer security. The company went public in 1996, and was acquired by Network Associates (later McAfee Labs) in 1998. She continued to work for Network Associates until 2003, as Vice President of Advanced Security Research. She joined the Information Sciences Institute in 2003.

In 2020, Benzel was elected to the board of governors of the IEEE Computer Society.

== Recognition ==
Benzel was named an IEEE Fellow, in the 2024 class of fellows, "for leadership in establishing the field of cybersecurity experimentation".
