= Bandit Queen (band) =

British indie rock band

- Origin: Manchester, England
- Genres: Indie rock
- Years active: 1992–1997
- Labels: Playtime, Mammoth (US)
- Past members: Tracy Godding; Janet Wolstenholme; David Galley

Bandit Queen were a British indie rock band from Manchester, England, formed in 1992. They disbanded in 1998 after releasing one album.

== History ==
The band was formed by former music journalist and member of Swirl, Tracy Godding (vocals, guitar), along with fellow former Swirl members Janet Wolstenholme (bass guitar) and David Galley (drums), with the band name inspired by Phoolan Devi. Godding explained "I was just inspired by her endurance".

The band were signed by Playtime Records, who issued all of their releases, with their second EP and debut album also issued in the US by Mammoth Records, although the latter had one track removed for the US release, the band speculating that this may have been due to it "having the word 'cunt' in it 32 times".

Debut album Hormone Hotel was produced by Pat Collier and John Robb, and featured a picture of one of the band's key influences on its cover, Frida Kahlo. The band recorded a second album in 1997, co -produced by the band and Mark Freegard, but it wasn't released and the band split and went their own ways in 1998.

== Musical style ==
Colin Larkin described the band's sound as blending "the pop sensibilities of early Blondie with the modern feminist swagger of The Breeders". Douglas Wolk described them as "a streamlined rock trio, with a dry, explosive sound that recalls In Utero or the first couple of PJ Harvey albums".

== Discography ==
=== Singles, EPs ===
- Dirt + Soul EP (1993), Playtime
- "Scorch" (1994), Playtime
- "Queen Bee" (1994), Playtime
- "Miss Dandys" (1994), Playtime
- "Give it to the Dog" (1995), Playtime

=== Albums ===
- Hormone Hotel (1994), Playtime
- PET (2010)
