= I'd Wait a Million Years =

Single by The Grass Roots

from the album Leaving It All Behind
- B-side: "Fly Me to Havana"
- Released: June 1969
- Genre: Psychedelic pop
- Length: 2:35
- Label: ABC/Dunhill
- Songwriters: Gary Zekley; Mitchell Bottler
- Producer: Steve Barri

The Grass Roots singles chronology
"The River Is Wide" (1969)	"I'd Wait a Million Years" (1969)	"Heaven Knows" (1969)

"I'd Wait a Million Years" (also known as "Wait a Million Years", "Million Years or So", or simply "Million Years") is a 1969 hit single by The Grass Roots.

== Background ==
It was the first of three single releases from the group's fifth LP, Leaving It All Behind, and is among the group's five greatest hits. It was written by Gary Zekley and Mitchell Bottler. The album version contains a slow organ intro and a longer fadeout, increasing the track's length by almost a minute.

== Chart performance ==
The song reached number 15 on the U.S. Billboard Hot 100 during the weeks ending September 13 and 20, 1969 and number 12 on the Cash Box Top 100. In Canada, "I'd Wait a Million Years" spent three weeks at number 12.

=== Weekly charts ===
Chart (1969)	Peak position
Canada RPM Top Singles	12
US Billboard Hot 100	15
US Cash Box Top 100	12

=== Year-end charts ===
Chart (1969)	Rank
Canada Top Singles (RPM)	98
US (Joel Whitburn's Pop Annual)	125
US Cash Box	56

== Personnel ==
Arranged By [Horns] – Jimmie Haskell
