= Temptation Eyes =

Single by The Grass Roots

from the album More Golden Grass
- B-side: "Keepin' Me Down"
- Released: December 1970
- Genre: Soft rock
- Length: 2:40
- Label: ABC/Dunhill
- Songwriters: Harvey Price, Daniel Walsh
- Producer: Steve Barri

The Grass Roots singles chronology
"Come on and Say It" (1970)	"Temptation Eyes" (1970)	"Sooner or Later" (1971)

"Temptation Eyes" is a 1970 hit song by The Grass Roots. It was released on their second compilation album, More Golden Grass.

== Background ==
The song reached number 15 on the U.S. Billboard Hot 100 in 1971. It spent 18 weeks on the charts, making it the band's single of greatest longevity, sustaining itself three weeks longer than their greatest hit, "Midnight Confessions".

Two versions exist. The original mono mix had its vocal chorus section double-tracked, while the chorus in the stereo mix uses one voice (single-tracked).

Grass Roots' lead singer Rob Grill 1991 cited "Temptation Eyes" as his personal favorite Grass Roots song.

== Charts ==
=== Weekly charts ===
Chart (1970–1971)	Peak position
Australia KMR	79
Canada Top Singles (RPM)	22
US Billboard Hot 100	15
US Cash Box Top 100	16

=== Year-end charts ===
Chart (1971)	Rank
US Billboard Hot 100	29

== Cover versions ==
- Erica Smith covered "Temptation Eyes" on her 1989 Columbia Release Holiday LP, Produced by: Gary Spaniola.
- Blake Babies covered "Temptation Eyes" on their 1993 Innocence and Experience LP.
- The Replacements also performed the song for the Let It Be sessions in 1984. The song has shown up in bootleg form, and was later included on the deluxe edition of Let it Be.
