= Freda Love Smith =

American drummer

Freda Love Smith (born Freda Boner, later used the stage name Freda Love) is an American musician, journalist, and non-fiction author. Smith is known as a drummer and vocalist for several alternative rock bands, including Blake Babies, Antenna, Mysteries of Life, Some Girls and Sunshine Boys. She is the author of Red Velvet Underground, a memoir and cookbook published in 2015 and of I Quit Everything, "an account of one woman's quest to shed addictive substances and behaviors in her life - which dares to ask if we're really better off without them."

Smith attended Indiana University Bloomington, where she earned her Bachelor of Arts degree in general studies. She also earned a Master of Arts degree from Nottingham Trent University in creative writing. Smith was a lecturer and undergraduate advisor for the Northwestern University Department of Radio/Television/Film until 2022.
