= Tyson Meade =

American singer and songwriter

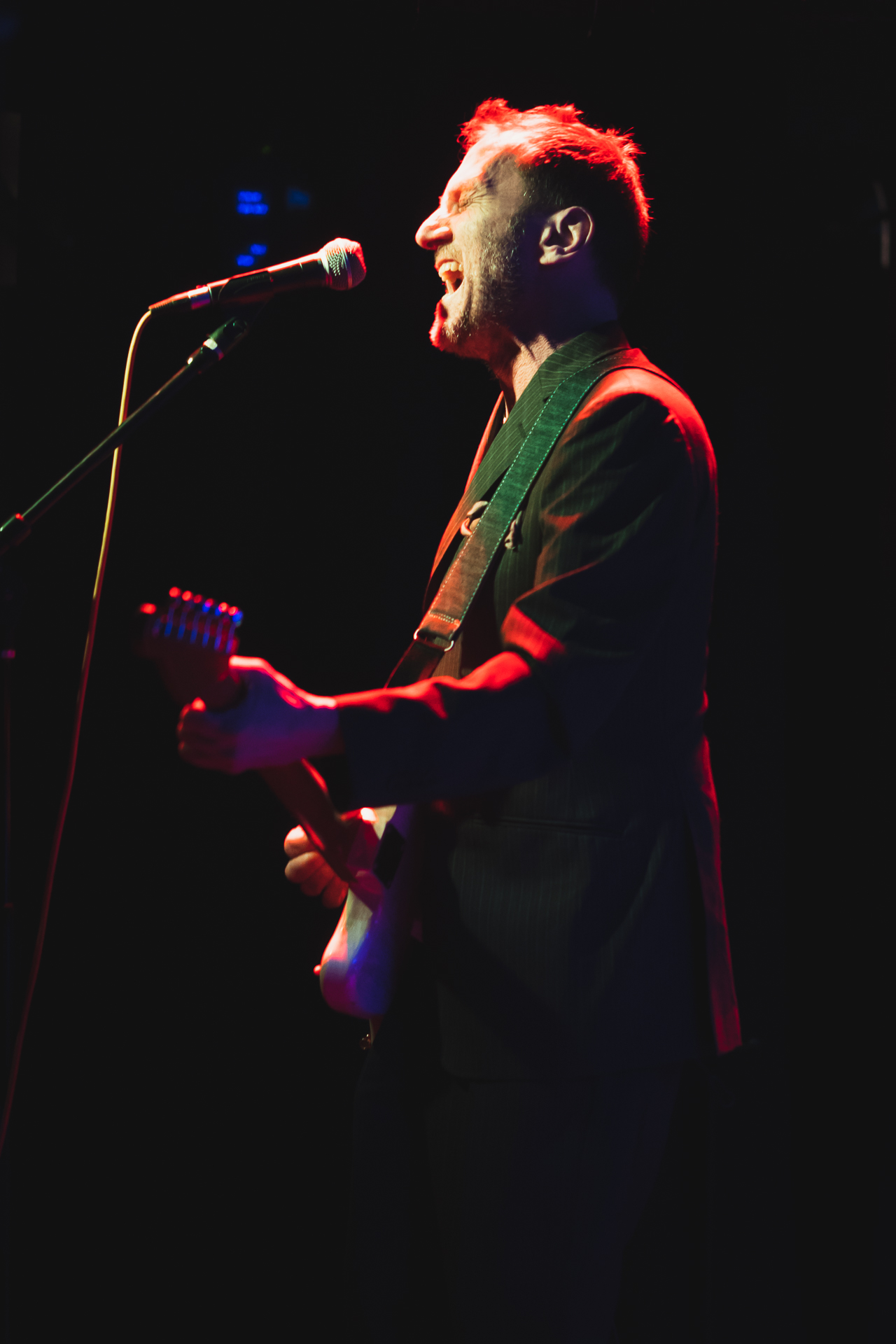

Background information
- Born: Tyson Todd Meade; September 15, 1962 (age 63); Bartlesville, Oklahoma, U.S.
- Genres: Rock, alternative rock, indie rock
- Occupations: Singer-songwriter, musician
- Instruments: vocals, guitar
- Labels: Echostatic, Spacebaby
- Website: tysonmeade.com

Tyson Todd Meade (born September 15, 1962) is an American singer and songwriter best known as the leader and creative force behind alternative rock groups Defenestration and Chainsaw Kittens.

== Background ==
Meade was born in Bartlesville, Oklahoma, the youngest of five children. Before settling into retirement, his father worked as an architect, and his mother pursued a career as a nurse. Both parents, according to Meade, instilled in their son the values of treating others with respect, as well as frugality. Meade's childhood was filled by music: “[Music] was the only thing I was into" says Meade, "It consumed me." His sister Connie—16 when he was born in 1962—would yank him out of the crib when the Beatles came on the radio. His mom would do the same with groups like the Supremes. "She really loved 'Love Is Like an Itching in My Heart,'" says Meade. His first two rock shows were Elvis at the Tulsa Assembly Center in 1972 and a night with Alice Cooper's harrowing Welcome to My Nightmare tour in 1975 . Meade's musical interest eventually gravitated to musicians like New York Dolls, David Bowie, T-Rex (band), and Patti Smith. According to Meade, music was the only place where he could find people who thought and dressed like him.

After graduating from high school in 1980, Meade and fellow music lover, Todd Walker, hung out that summer and wrote songs. According to Meade, "We were all listening to the same stuff—punk, new wave, and fringe bands like Bowie, early Who and T-Rex. My brother Gentry sold me a Gibson Marauder. My cousin Duane showed me three chords, and said I could learn from there. One of the skaters [Meade hung out with] was Todd Walker, who started writing songs with me." Their common love of music and Meade's frustration with 1980s corporate rock led to the formation of his first band, Defenestration, with Todd Walker Clark Walker and other associates.

== Defenestration ==
Defenestration eventually moved to Norman, Oklahoma, where the band recorded its 1984's self-titled record. The relative success of that debut led to a deal with the record company Relativity Records and the release of 1987's Dali Does Windows. Produced by Randy Burns (Megadeth, The Flaming Lips), Dali Does Windows was reviewed as "a straightforward rock album, albeit one with the staunchly idiosyncratic Tyson Meade at its heart."

Eventually, artistic differences created a power struggle between Meade and Walker. The result was Walker being asked to leave the band and Defenestration falling apart: “Todd Walker and I had the usual power struggle, and the other guys and I kicked him out,” Meade says. “When we got another guitarist, things were just awful. We started working at an algae farm because we were so broke. It was basically slave labor with 12-hour workdays at $5.00 an hour no overtime. I started to have a breakdown.” Though he dove headfirst into writing songs, it became apparent to Meade that the new incarnation of Defenestration was lacking something. Frustrated and demoralized, Meade packed it in and returned to Norman, where he took a job at indie shop Shadowplay Records. Defenestration was no more.

== Chainsaw Kittens ==
While working at Shadowplay Records, Meade met Trent Bell, “a regular customer and loiterer,” and eventual lead guitarist to Chainsaw Kittens, who also won a Grammy as a producer in 2012. Bell informed Meade about a group of high schoolers that had a band and were about to kick out their singer. Bell suggested that Meade's songs would be perfect for the band. Meade recalled, "I thought it was ridiculous, but I didn't have any other options I could think of, so I decided to play the kids my songs." After holding practice session for a month in 1989, Chainsaw Kittens were born, their name a nod to their trashy punk guitar sound and baby faces. [id] Along with the other founding members—guitarist Mark Metzger, bass guitarist Kevin McElhaney, and drummer Ted Leader—Chainsaw Kittens recorded a demo and received a contract offer almost immediately from Mammoth Records. Whereas in Defenestration it was all tempered with a vaguely mainstream rock sensibility, Todd Walker's main contribution to the band—the Chainsaw Kittens dove enthusiastically off the deep end, into the extreme waters of glam-pop-punk, full-on transvestitism, and openly gay lyrics. And while it had a lot do with creative statement, it was also the work of Meade's increased understanding of his chosen industry: “I had a definite [idea] of what I wanted the Kittens to be," Meade says. "I wanted to have a band that was signed and made records. A month [after getting together], we made our first demo, and a month after that we were in negotiations with Mammoth Records.”

The band's inaugural album, Violent Religion, introduced Chainsaw Kittens' knack for creating fragile melodies and catchy pop choruses alongside twisted lyrics and powerful, raw guitars. The last track on Violent Religion, "She's Gone Mad," was covered by fellow-Norman based alt-rockers, The Flaming Lips on their album The Day They Shot a Hole in the Jesus Egg. Before touring in support of their debut, guitarist Trent Bell joined Chainsaw Kittens. While on the road, the band witnessed two additional changes to the lineup; Aaron Preston took over drumming duties, while Clint McBay replaced McElhaney on bass. With the new lineup, featuring Meade, Metzger, McBay, Preston, and Bell, the band recorded their sophomore effort, Flipped Out in Singapore, for which they employed the services of Nirvana's Nevermind producer, Butch Vig. Released on Mammoth Records in 1992, the album, containing the songs "Connie I’ve Found the Door" and "High in High School," enabled the group's profile and fan base to grow. Another song from Flipped Out in Singapore, "She Gets", is featured on the soundtrack to William Friedkin's 2006 movie, Bug starring Ashley Judd. Eventually, Clint McBay and Aaron Preston left the band, both landing on the lineup of straight-and-narrow alt-rockers For Love Not Lisa, who scored a song on the 1994 soundtrack for The Crow.

Meade installed Kittens-obsessed Chicagoan Matt Johnson on bass and Eric Harmon on drums, promoted Trent Bell to lead guitarist, and the Kittens set to work on their third album, Pop Heiress, with A-list producer John Agnello. Eventually because of strained relationship between Mammoth Records and Atlantic Records, Mammoth cut Chainsaw Kittens loose. Because the Smashing Pumpkins and Chainsaw Kittens had shared producers and toured together in the early 1990s, members of both bands had become friends. So when James Iha and D'arcy Wretzky of Smashing Pumpkins started their own independent label Scratchie Records, the available Chainsaw Kittens were the perfect place to start. In 1996, the Chainsaw Kittens released their self-titled album, Chainsaw Kittens, under Scratchie Records. Later, the band released a fifth full-length album, The All American, on Four Alarm Records. Despite limited exposure, The All American too received critical praise. Since 2001, Chainsaw Kittens have been on indefinite hiatus. The band reunited for a performance at the Norman Music Festival in Norman, Oklahoma on April 26, 2008.

== Solo career and life after the Kittens ==
Meade has produced two full-length solo albums: Motorcycle Childhood and Kitchens and Bathrooms. He also recently collaborated with Derek Brown of The Flaming Lips and Jesse Tabish of Other Lives on a project called "Winter Boys."

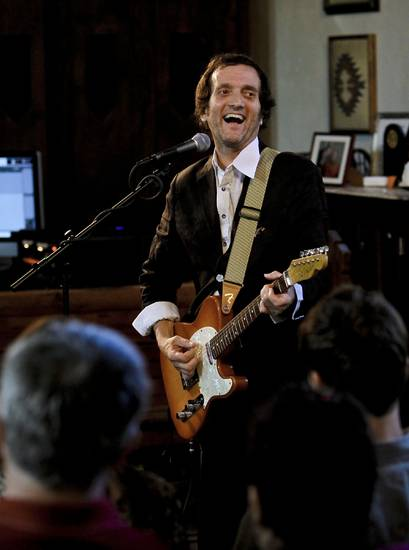
Tyson performing live at CHouse (June 20, 2012)

Meade resided in Shanghai, the People's Republic of China, where he taught English. Although Meade still adores the aura of glam rock and looks back fondly on his days with Defenestration and Chainsaw Kittens, he admitted burning out as a performer. When he put aside his rock persona and shifted into more of a storyteller with a guitar, he said he fell in love with being onstage again. To this end, Meade now returns to America annually and treats his fans to the occasional concert at Chouse in Norman. He now lives back in Norman. Meade is currently set to work on a third solo album, wherein Meade will record at high schools and universities in China with students. Meade describes the project: “In many ways this is diplomatic and, at the very least, a cultural exchange; in some small way. I would like people to know that Chinese people are awesome. This has become very important to me because when I talk about my love for the Chinese people I sometimes get the most heartbreaking responses from people who just do not know how much the Chinese LOVE us! I was in Shanghai and other areas of China for five years and the one thing that I learned is that the Chinese LOVE America and Americans!”

Meade moved back to the U.S. and teaches at Mustang High School in Mustang, Oklahoma.

Asked about being called a godfather of alternative rock music, Meade had this to say:

I hate to try to credit myself for something that I may or may not have created. At the time, I was fed up with everything going on in music. If you were alive in the 80s you know to what music and bands I am referring. The music that was happening was in no way speaking to me. Furthermore, life in general seemed so restricted. When I started writing music, I was not satisfied with the two choices that were given to me as an 18-year-old. The first choice was go to college in order to work your life away at an office. The other choice was to be a townie and work at a machine shop or restaurant in my hometown. I wanted something different that did not entail a new couch, a new car, a new dining room set. Fortunately, I met a like-minded soul in my hometown and we innocently and haphazardly went about putting together a band. This whole process was a head banging one; that is, a banging my head against the wall one. I soon learned, no clubs would book a band that played original songs. Clubs only booked cover bands at that time in the early and mid-80s. So, we played house parties and VFW halls. If we made 20 bucks we were happy, not 20 bucks apiece but altogether. There were a few other bands that were not hardcore punk doing the same thing but not very many. And, I wrote songs about my life and my inner-struggles and all of that sort of stuff that you have going on when you are in your late teens and early 20s. We rammed 50s guitar licks into 60s power pop colliding into 70s glam and punk and more glam and then pureed it in a blender and we had our sound. Soon after, a hoard of other bands did the same and called it grunge or alternative rock. It then became a big business. I never made any money; I have been paid in fan letters, which is really what I set out to do. I set out to make some sort of change. And I feel as if I did. So, I guess I am one of the alterna-Forefathers. I am a starving alterna-Forefather.

== Political career ==
In 2018 Meade was one of several Democrats who filed to run for Oklahoma's 5th congressional district, then held by Steve Russell.

== Solo discography ==
- Motorcycle Childhood (Echostatic/Spacebaby, 1995)
- Kitchens & Bathrooms (Self Released, 2008)

== Electoral history ==
2018 Oklahoma's 5th congressional district Democratic primary results
Party	Candidate	Votes	%
Democratic	Kendra Horn	34,857	43.8
Democratic	Tom Guild	14,242	17.9
Democratic	Elysabeth Britt	10,739	13.5
Democratic	Eddie Porter	8,447	10.6
Democratic	Leona Kelley-Leonard	6,693	8.4
Democratic	Tyson Meade	4,527	5.7
Total votes		79,505	100.0
