= John Strohm (musician) =

American musician, singer, lawyer, and music-industry executive

John P. Strohm
- Born: March 23, 1967 (age 59); Bloomington, Indiana
- Education: Cumberland School of Law
- Occupations: Musician, lawyer, music-industry executive
- Years active: 1980s–present
- Musical career
- Genre: Indie rock
- Instruments: Drums, guitar
- Formerly of: Blake Babies, Velo-Deluxe, The Lemonheads, Antenna

John Strohm (or John P. Strohm, born March 23, 1967, in Bloomington, Indiana) is an American musician, singer, lawyer, and music-industry executive.

== Early life ==
Strohm grew up in Bloomington, Indiana, where his father was an English professor.

== Career ==
=== As a musician ===
Strohm began his musical career playing drums in Indiana's punk rock scene, then moved to Boston in 1985 and switched to guitar. With Juliana Hatfield and Freda Love (then Freda Boner) he co-founded the indie rock trio Blake Babies in 1986.

In 1994 the band Velo-Deluxe, with Strohm as the frontman, released their only album, Superelastic, through Mammoth Records.

Strohm also played drums in The Lemonheads from 1987 to 1989 and guitar in 1993–1994 and 1996–1997. He performed on the albums Creator, Come on Feel the Lemonheads, and Car Button Cloth.

He led the indie rock band Antenna, which released two albums and two EPs in the early 1990s.

Strohm released his first solo record, Caledonia, in 1996, backed by the Hello Strangers. AllMusic described the record as "twangy country-rock" in the vein of Gram Parsons.

His second solo album, Vestavia, was released in 1999.

In 2007, Strohm released his third solo album, Everyday Life.

Strohm's fourth solo album will be released in 2023. It was inspired by his friend, the late record producer and Polara frontman Ed Ackerson, who was a member of Antenna and produced Strohm's 1999 solo album Vestavia. The album's lead single, "Something To Look Forward To", was originally recorded in July 2019 at Ackerson's Flowers Studio and was the last collaboration between the two men before Ackerson's death. Strohm finished the track in 2022 with producer Paul Mahern. The album will also include a cover of Strohm's favorite Polara song, "A+B=Y" (originally from Polara's self-titled debut).

=== As a lawyer and music executive ===
From 2011 to 2017, Strohm worked for the Nashville law firm Loeb & Loeb LLP as senior counsel in their music industry practice. He worked with bands including Alabama Shakes, Bon Iver, The Civil Wars, Sturgill Simpson, Dawes, and Julien Baker.

In late 2017, he was named President of Rounder Records.

After leaving Rounder in 2022, he joined the Nashville law firm Frost Brown Todd.

== Education ==
Strohm attended Berklee College of Music in Boston for two years but dropped out to pursue music.

In 1998, he enrolled at University of Alabama at Birmingham to complete his B.A., majoring in history with a minor in music technology. He then earned a Juris Doctor degree from Samford University Cumberland School of Law in Birmingham, Alabama, graduating magna cum laude in 2004 and serving as editor-in-chief of the Cumberland Law Review.

== Discography ==
Solo

- Caledonia (Flat Earth Records, 1996)
- Vestavia (Flat Earth Records, 1999)
- Everyday Life (Superphonic Records, 2007)
- Something To Look Forward To (Propeller Sound Recordings, 2023)

With the Blake Babies

With Velo-Deluxe

- Superelastic (Mammoth Records, 1994)

With the Lemonheads

- Creator (Taang! Records, 1988)
- Come on Feel the Lemonheads (Atlantic Records, 1993)
- Car Button Cloth (Atlantic Records, 1996)

With Antenna

- Sway (Mammoth Records, 1991)
- Sleep EP (Mammoth, 1992)
- Hideout (Mammoth, 1993)
- For Now EP (Mammoth, 1993)
