= Mammoth Records =

American independent record label

- Parent company: Disney Music Group
- Founded: 1989
- Founder: Jay Faires
- Defunct: 2006
- Genre: Various
- Country of origin: U.S.
- Location: Carrboro, North Carolina
- Official website: mammoth.com (archived)

Mammoth Records was an independent record label founded in 1989 by Jay Faires in the Carrboro area of Chapel Hill, North Carolina. The majority of the acts on Mammoth were executive-produced by Faires and the label's general manager, Steve Balcom. The label was the first independent to produce two platinum records.

Mammoth's roster included Antenna, The Backsliders, Bandit Queen, The Bats, Blake Babies, Chainsaw Kittens, Clarissa. Dash Rip Rock, Dillon Fence, Frente!, Fu Manchu, Fun-Da-Mental, Jason & the Scorchers, Jocelyn Montgomery, Joe Henry, Juliana Hatfield, Kill Creek, Machines of Loving Grace, Mark Lizotte, My Friend Steve, Pure, Seven Mary Three, Squirrel Nut Zippers, The Hope Blister, The Melvins, The Sidewinders, Vanilla Trainwreck, and Victoria Williams.

== History ==
Mammoth first signed Tucson band The Sidewinders; The Sidewinder's debut album, Witchdoctor, sold to RCA within Mammoth's first three months of business. Another early signing, Blake Babies, led by Berklee School of Music students Juliana Hatfield and John Strohm, released “Earwig” and “Sunburn” with Mammoth before breaking up. John Strohm went on to release two solo albums with Mammoth under the moniker Antenna while Juliana Hatfield released solo efforts Hey Babe and Only Everything with Mammoth. Louisiana Music Hall of Famer Dash Rip Rock signed to Mammoth with its 1989 release, Ace of Clubs, produced by Jim Dickinson. Chainsaw Kittens released four albums with Mammoth, including its second album, Flipped Out in Singapore, which was Butch Vig’s follow-up project after producing Nirvana’s Nevermind.

The first signing from the local Chapel Hill college scene was Dillon Fence; the group released three albums on the Mammoth label between 1991 and 1995. Also from the local area, Mammoth signed Vanilla Trainwreck; the band released Sofa Livin’ Dreamazine and two other albums. After The Sidewinders, a second Tucson band—Machines of Loving Grace—was signed to Mammoth. That band released three albums with Mammoth between 1991 and 1995 with the album Concentration gaining national attention. Multiple Grammy Award winner Joe Henry released albums with Mammoth between 1992 and 2001, including Trampoline and Fuse. Through a distribution deal with Les Claypool’s Prawn Song Records, Mammoth released The Charlie Hunter Trio’s self-titled album in 1993; Charlie Hunter went on to sign with the jazz label Blue Note Records. The label’s early success across a spectrum of genres with acts like Blake Babies, Chainsaw Kittens, Dash Rip Rock, Dillon Fence, Juliana Hatfield, Joe Henry and Machines of Loving Grace attracted the attention of Atlantic Records. Mammoth and Atlantic Records formed a joint venture in 1992.

During the Atlantic era, Mammoth signed Frente!. Frente!’s cover of New Order’s “Bizarre Love Triangle” went Top 10 on Billboard Modern Rock Charts, and its record, Marvin The Album, shipped more than 750,000 copies worldwide. The label also added Victoria Williams to its roster, releasing her albums, Loose and This Moment: In Toronto with the Loose Band. Mammoth set a precedent for recognizing and promoting female, alternative voices with acts, such as The Black Girls, Blake Babies, Juliana Hatfield, Frente!, and Victoria Williams. Frente!, which MTV labeled "Buzz Bin", and Hatfield both sold more than 250,000 records.

When Chris Douridas was the director of music at KCRW, Mammoth teamed with the radio station to release Rare on Air, a four-part compilation series featuring artists such as Radiohead, Tori Amos, Lindsey Buckingham, Los Lobos, Beck, Nick Cave, John Cale, World Party, Philip Glass, The Cranberries, Jackson Browne, Fiona Apple, Ben Folds, James Taylor, Ani Difranco, Randy Newman, Jeff Buckley, Mazzy Starr, Patti Smith, Tom Waits, PJ Harvey and Lucinda Williams.

Nashville-based Jason and the Scorchers had a second life after signing with Mammoth Records and released three albums with the label. In 1996, the New Orleans Dirty Dozen Brass Band, released Ears to the Wall with Mammoth, an album produced by The Black Crowes’ Chris Robinson. Seven Mary Three recorded three albums between 1995 and 1998 with Mammoth. Its debut album, American Standard, sold 1.3 million copies aloft the single "Cumbersome", making Seven Mary Three the record label's first platinum seller.

In 1997, Mammoth Records returned to an independent label. Squirrel Nut Zippers released six albums with Mammoth from 1994 to 2000; its second album, Hot, was released towards the end of 1996 and climbed the charts as Mammoth separated from Atlantic. Hot became Mammoth's second platinum record. As an independent, the label also saw the release of Jocelyn Montgomery's “Et Ideo,” produced by David Lynch.

Later, Mammoth made headway with big beat and the early electronic movement from the United Kingdom with bands like The Freestylers, which MTV deemed “Buzzworthy,” and The Wiseguys, whose single “Ooh La La” on The Antidote became a breakout party anthem. Founder of British label 4AD and leader of This Mortal Coil, Ivo Watts-Russell, released his band The Hope Blisters' album Smiles OK on Mammoth in the U.S., an album including work by other artists, including Brian Eno and John Cale.

Mammoth artists were featured on soundtracks for The Crow (Machines of Loving Grace) alongside Nine Inch Nails and Rage Against the Machine, The Crow: City of Angels (Seven Mary Three) alongside Hole and White Zombie, Hurricane Streets (Pure and Seven Mary Three) alongside Mary's Playground and Xzibit, My So Called Life (Frente!, Chainsaw Kittens and Juliana Hatfield) alongside Sonic Youth and The Lemonheads, Trey Parker and Matt Stone’s Orgazmo (The Dust Brothers) alongside Wu-Tang Clan and Dilated Peoples, the triple platinum album for Reality Bites (Juliana Hatfield) alongside Lisa Loeb and U2, Saturday Morning Cartoons (Frente! and Juliana Hatfield) alongside Matthew Sweet and the Ramones, and the compilation album Music for Our Mother Ocean (Seven Mary Three) alongside the Beastie Boys and No Doubt.

The success of the Squirrel Nut Zippers' albums, along with the development of other Mammoth bands—like Pure with Generation Six-Pack, Fu Manchu, and the Backsliders—focused the industry’s attention on the newly independent Mammoth. The label sold to The Walt Disney Company in late 1997.

== Discography ==
=== 1988 ===
- A Picture Made - "Past"
- The Downsiders - All My Friends Are Fish

=== 1989 ===
- Blackgirls - Procedure
- Dash Rip Rock - Ace of Clubs
- The Sidewinders - Witchdoctor
- Blake Babies - Sunburn

=== 1990 ===
- Chainsaw Kittens - Violent Religion
- Dash Rip Rock - Not of This World
- Frequency - North Carolina Compilation
- The Sidewinders - Auntie Ramos' Pool Hall
- Joe Henry - Shuffletown

=== 1991 ===
- Antenna - Sway
- Blackgirls - Happy
- Dash Rip Rock - Boiled Alive
- Machines of Loving Grace - Machines of Loving Grace
- Vanilla Trainwreck - Sofa Livin' Dreamazine

=== 1992 ===
- The Bats - Fear of God
- Big Wheel - Holiday Manor
- Chainsaw Kittens - Flipped Out in Singapore
- Dillon Fence - Rosemary
- Joe Henry - Short Man's Room
- Juliana Hatfield - Hey Babe
- Vanilla Trainwreck - Sounding to Try Like You

=== 1993 ===
- Antenna - Hideout
- The Bats - Silverbeet
- Blake Babies - Innocence & Experience
- Chainsaw Kittens - Angel on the Range (EP)
- Charlie Hunter Trio - Charlie Hunter Trio
- Dillon Fence - Outside In
- Jacobites - Jacobites
- Joe Henry - Kindness of the World
- The Juliana Hatfield Three - Become What You Are
- M.I.R.V. - Cosmodrome
- Machines of Loving Grace - Concentration
- Various - Cocktails at Five - Mammoth's First Five Years
- Various - They Went Thatta Way!
- Fun-Da-Mental - "Countryman"/"Tribal Revolution"

=== 1994 ===
- Alphabet Soup - Take a Ride
- Banco de Gaia - Maya
- The Bats - Daddy's Highway
- The Bats - The Law of Things
- Blake Babies - Nicely, Nicely
- Chainsaw Kittens - Pop Heiress
- Dillon Fence - Living Room Scene
- Frente! - Marvin the Album
- Kevin Kinney - Down Out Law
- Kill Creek - St. Valentine's Garage
- Laundry - Blacktongue
- Machines Of Loving Grace - "Butterfly Wings" (single)
- Porch - Porch
- Vanilla Trainwreck - Mordecai
- Various - Jabberjaw: Good To The Last Drop
- Various - Rare On Air (Live Performances Vol. One)
- Velo-Deluxe - Superelastic
- Victoria Williams - Loose
- Victoria Williams - Swing The Statue!
- Pure - "Anna is a Speed Freak"

=== 1995 ===
- Alphabet Soup - Layin' Low in the Cut
- Banco De Gaia - Last Train to Lhasa
- Bandit Queen - Hormone Hotel
- The Bats - Couchmaster
- Eat Static - Abduction
- Eat Static - Implant
- Eskimo - The Further Adventures of Der Shrimpkin
- Fun-Da-Mental - Seize the Time
- Jason & the Scorchers - A Blazing Grace
- Johnette Napolitano & Holly Vincent - Vowel Movement
- Juliana Hatfield - Only Everything
- Machines of Loving Grace - Gilt
- Seven Mary Three - American Standard
- Squirrel Nut Zippers - The Inevitable
- TimeShard - Crystal Oscillations
- Various - Feed Your Head Volume 1
- Various - Feed Your Head Volume 2
- Various - Quadruped V.1
- Various - Rare On Air: Volume 2 (Live Sessions From KCRW's Morning Becomes Eclectic)
- Various - Transmissions From The Planet Dog
- Various - Up & Down Club Sessions Vol. 1
- Various - Up & Down Club Sessions Vol. 2
- Victoria Williams - This Moment in Toronto with the Loose Band

=== 1996 ===
- Banco de Gaia - Live At Glastonbury
- Children of the Bong - Sirius Sounds
- Clarissa - Silver
- The Dirty Dozen Brass Band - Ears to the Wall
- Frente! - Shape
- Fu Manchu - In Search of...
- Future Loop Foundation - Time and Bass
- Jack Drag - Jack Drag
- Jason & the Scorchers - Clear Impetuous Morning
- Jason & the Nashville Scorchers - Reckless Country Soul
- Joe Henry - Trampoline
- Kill Creek - Proving Winter Cruel
- Melvins - Stag
- Pure - Generation Six-Pack
- The Raymond Brake - Never Work Ever
- Seven Mary Three - "Water's Edge" (single)
- Squirrel Nut Zippers - Hot
- TimeShard - Hunab Ku
- Various - Jabberjaw Vol. 2: Pure Sweet Hell
- Various - MTV Buzz Bin: Volume 1
- Various - Planet Dub

=== 1997 ===
- The Backsliders - Throwin' Rocks at the Moon
- Banco De Gaia - Big Men Cry
- Clarissa - Blood and Commons
- Eat Static - Science of the Gods
- Elevate Interior - Fabric Woolly Mammoth
- Fu Manchu - The Action is Go
- Jack Drag - Unisex Headwave
- James Mathus and His Knock-Down Society - Play Songs for Rosetta
- Seven Mary Three - RockCrown
- Squirrel Nut Zippers - "Hell" (single)
- Strangefolk - Weightless in Water
- Two Dollar Pistols - On Down the Track
- Various - Feed Your Head Volume 3 - Accelerating The Alpha Rhythms
- Various - Hurricane Streets (Music From The Motion Picture)
- Various - MTV Buzz Bin: Volume 2
- Various - Rare On Air: Volume 3
- Various - Tranced Out and Dreaming

=== 1998 ===
- April March - Lessons of April March
- Creeper Lagoon - I Become Small and Go
- Far Too Jones - Picture Postcard Walls
- The Hope Blister - ...smile's OK
- Jason & the Scorchers - Midnight Roads & Stages Seen
- Jocelyn Montgomery with David Lynch - Lux Vivens
- My Friend Steve - Hope and Wait
- Natural Calamity - Peach Head
- Pure - "Feverish" (single)
- Seven Mary Three - Orange Ave.
- Squirrel Nut Zippers - Christmas Caravan
- Squirrel Nut Zippers - Perennial Favorites
- Various - Mammoth Records 1988-1998 A Sound Decade
- Various - Music From the X-Games Volume 3
- Various - Rare On Air Volume 4
- The Wiseguys - The Antidote

=== 1999 ===
- 10¢ - Buggin' Out
- A - A vs. Monkey Kong
- April March - Chrominance Decoder
- The Blacksliders - Southern Lines
- The Dirty Dozen Brass Band - Buck Jump
- Freestylers - We Rock Hard
- Fu Manchu - King of the Road
- Joe Henry - Fuse
- Katharine Whalen's Jazz Squad - Katharine Whalen's Jazz Squad
- Mark Lizotte - Soul Lost Companion
- Medina Green - "I See"/"Full Court Press"
- Splendid - Have You Got a Name For It
- Strangefolk - A Great Long While
- Styles of Beyond - 2000 Fold
- Various - Morning Becomes Eclectic

=== 2000 ===
- Frankie Machine - One
- John Wesley Harding - The Confessions of St. Ace
- Squirrel Nut Zippers - Bedlam Ballroom
- The Young Fresh Fellows/The Minus 5 - Because We Hate You/Let the War Against Music Begin

=== 2001 ===
- James Mathus and His Knock-Down Society - National Antiseptic
- Joe Henry - Scar
- Joe Henry - Selections
- John Wesley Harding - I'm Wrong About Everything
- Seven Mary Three - The Economy of Sound

=== 2002 ===
- A - Hi-Fi Serious
- Freestylers - Pressure Point
- Fu Manchu - California Crossing
- Los Lobos - Good Morning Aztlán
- Schatzi - Fifty Reasons to Explode
- Scapegoat Wax - SWAX

=== 2004 ===
- Los Lobos - The Ride

=== 2005 ===
- Various - Look at All the Love We Found: A Tribute to Sublime

=== 2006 ===
- Los Lobos - The Town and the City
