= Petula Clark discography =

- Studio albums: 47
- Live albums: 8
- Compilation albums: 12
- Singles: 131

This is a discography for British singer Petula Clark.

== Studio albums ==
=== 1950s ===
Title	Album details	Peak chart positions	
Title	Album details	UK	US
Petula Clark Sings	Released: 1956 (UK); Label: Pye Nixa	—	—
A Date with Pet	Released: 1956 (UK); Label: Pye Nixa	—	—
You Are My Lucky Star	Released: 1957 (UK); Label: Pye Nixa	—	—
À Musicorama	Released: 1958 (FRA); Label: Vogue	—	—
Petula Clark in Hollywood / Pet Clark	Released: 1959 (UK/US); Label: Pye Nixa/Imperial	—	—
Prends mon coeur	Released: 1959 (FRA); Label: Vogue	—	—

=== 1960s ===
Title	Album details	Peak chart positions		
Title	Album details	UK	CAN	US
Tête à tête avec Petula Clark	Released: 1961 (FRA); Label: Vogue	—	—	—
Rendez-vous avec Petula Clark	Released: 1962 (FRA); Label: Vogue	—	—	—
In Other Words	Released: 1962 (UK); Label: Pye	—	—	—
Petula	Released: 1962 (FRA/UK); Label: Vogue/Pye	—	—	—
Le soleil dans les yeux	Released: 1963 (CAN); Label: Vogue	—	—	—
Ceux qui ont un coeur	Released: 1964 (FRA); Label: Vogue	—	—	—
Hello Paris	Released: 1964 (FRA/UK); Label: Vogue/Pye	—	—	—
Petula au Canada	Released: 1964 (CAN); Label: Vogue	—	—	—
Les James Dean	Released: 1964 (FRA/UK); Label: Vogue/Pye	—	—	—
Downtown	Released: 1965 (UK/US); Label: Pye/Warner Bros.	—	—	21
I Know a Place	Released: 1965 (UK/US); Label: Pye/Warner Bros.	—	—	42
The World's Greatest International Hits	Released: 1965 (UK/US); Label: Pye/Warner Bros.	—	—	129
Petula '65	Released: 1965 (FRA); Label: Vogue	—	—	—
My Love	Released: 1966 (UK/US); Label: Pye/Warner Bros.	—	—	68
I Couldn't Live Without Your Love	Released: 1966 (UK/US); Label: Pye/Warner Bros.	11	—	43
Petula Clark '66	Released: 1966 (FRA); Label: Vogue	—	—	—
Colour My World	Released: 1967 (UK/US); Label: Pye/Warner Bros.	16	—	49
These Are My Songs	Released: 1967 (UK/US); Label: Pye/Warner Bros.	38	—	27
C'est ma chanson	Released: 1967 (FRA); Label: Vogue	—	—	—
Petula Italiana	Released: 1967 (CAN); Label: Vogue	—	—	—
The Other Man's Grass Is Always Greener	Released: 1968 (UK/US); Label: Pye/Warner Bros.	37	—	93
Petula	Released: 1968 (UK/US); Label: Pye/Warner Bros.	—	43	51
Portrait of Petula	Released: 1969 (UK/US); Label: Pye/Warner Bros.	—	35	37
Just Pet	Released: 1969 (UK/US); Label: Pye/Warner Bros.	—	—	176

=== 1970s ===
Title	Album details	Peak chart positions	
Title	Album details	UK	US
Memphis	Released: 1970 (UK/US); Label: Pye/Warner Bros.	—	198
Warm and Tender / The Song of My Life	Released: 1971 (UK/US); Label: Pye/Warner Bros.	—	178
Comme une prière	Released: 1972 (FRA); Label: Vogue	—	—
La chanson de Marie-Madeleine	Released: 1972 (FRA); Label: Vogue	—	—
Now	Released: 1972 (UK/US); Label: Polydor/MGM	—	—
Come On Home	Released: 1974 (UK); Label: Polydor	—	—
I'm the Woman You Need	Released: 1975 (UK); Label: Polydor	—	—
Blue Lady	Scheduled Release: 1976 (US); Label: ABC; Released: 1995 (US); Label: Varèse Sarabande	—	—
Je reviens	Released: 1977 (FRA); Label: CBS	—	—
Destiny	Released: 1978 (UK); Label: CBS	—	—

=== 1980s–2018 ===
Title	Album details	Peak chart positions		
Title	Album details	UK	BEL (WA)	US
Give It a Try	Released: 1986 (US); Label: Jango Music	—	—	—
Where The Heart Is	Released: 1998 (UK); Label: Anthology	—	—	—
Here For You	Released: 1998 (US); Label: Varèse Sarabande	—	—	—
Solitude & Sunshine: The Songs of Rod McKuen	Released: 2007 (US); Label: Stanyan Street	—	—	—
Lost in You	Released: 2013 (UK/US); Label: Sony/The End	24	—	—
From Now On	Released: 2016 (UK/US); Label: BMG	—	—	—
Living For Today	Released: 2017 (UK/US); Label: BMG	70	156	—
Vu d'ici	Released: 2018 (CAN); Label: Productions Martin Leclerc	—	—	—

== Live albums ==
Title	Album details	Peak chart positions	
Title	Album details	UK	US
Live At The Royal Albert Hall	Released: 1973 (UK); Label: Pye	—	—
Live in London	Released: 1974 (UK); Label: Polydor	—	—
An Hour In Concert With Petula Clark & The London Philharmonic Orchestra	Released: 1983 (UK); Label: Music For Pleasure	—	—
Live At The Copacabana	Released: 1993 (UK); Label: Sequel	—	—
Live 65	Released: 2000 (UK); Label: Magic Records	—	—
A Sign Of The Times	Released: 2001 (CAN); Label: Varèse Sarabande	—	—
Live At The Paris Olympia	Released: 2004 (UK/US); Label: Silva Screen	—	—
A Valentine's Day Concert at the Royal Albert Hall	Released: 2010 (EU); Label: United Music Foundation	—	—

== Charted compilations ==
Title	Album details	Peak chart positions							Certifications (sales thresholds)
Title	Album details	UK	AUS	BEL (WA)	CAN	FIN	NL	US	Certifications (sales thresholds)
Petula Clark's Hit Parade	Released: 1966 (UK); Label: Pye	18	—	—	—	—	—	—	
Greatest Hits Volume 1	Released: 1968 (US); Label: Warner Bros.	—	—	—	22	—	—	57	
20 All Time Greatest	Released: 1976 (UK); Label: K-tel	18	—	—	—	—	—	—	
My Song Album	Released: 1988 (NL); Label: Dino	—	—	—	—	—	45	—	
Les Années Petula...	Released: 1996 (FRA/CAN); Label: Vogue	—	—	8	—	—	—	—	
L'essentiel - 41 succès inoubliables	Released: 1999 (BEL); Label: Ariane AMC	—	—	10	—	—	—	—	
L'essentiel - 20 succès inoubliables	Released: 1999 (BEL); Label: Ariane AMC	—	—	43	—	—	—	—	
The Ultimate Collection	Released: 2002 (UK); Label: Sanctuary	18	88	—	—	37	—	—	
Kaléïdoscope	Released: 2003 (FRA); Label: Sanctuary	—	—	34	—	—	—	—	
Les plus grands succès de Petula Clark	Released: 2006 (CAN); Label: Sony	—	—	131	—	—	—	—	
Then & Now: The Very Best of Petula Clark	Released: 2008 (UK/US); Label: UMTV	17	—	—	—	—	—	—	BPI: Silver
Petula	Released: 2012 (FRA/CAN); Label: Sony	—	—	51	—	—	—	—	

== EPs ==
– The UK Pye Records / France Disques Vogue / U.S. Warner Bros. Records Years –

The monaural 7-inch 45 rpm / 45 T(ours) EP remained the preferred format of French record buyers until 1968. Disques Vogue discontinued the format in 1970, around the time Petula Clark's recording contract expired. UK Pye Records discontinued the (N)EP series in 1968.

Year	EP Title	Track Listing	Label / Catalogue No.
1964	Ceux Qui Ont Un Coeur (sung in French)	1. Ceux Qui Ont Un Coeur (Anyone Who Had A Heart); 2. Walter; 3. Prends Garde à Toi; 4. Il N'a Chante Qu'un Soir	France Disques Vogue EPL 8197
1964	Petula Clark (Chante en Anglais)	1. In Love; 2. Forgetting You; 3. True Love Never Runs Smooth; 4. Baby It’s Me	France Disques Vogue EPL 8224
1964	Hello! Dolly (sung in French)	1. Hello Dolly; 2. Pourquoi Papa; 3. Voila Les Temps Des Vacances (Party Time); 4. Toi Tu Joues a L’amour (I’m Looking At The World Through Teardrops)	France Disques Vogue EPL 8251
1964	Slowly Avec Petula (sung in French)	1. Petite Fleur; 2. Darling Je Vous Aime Beaucoup; 3. Vous Qui Passez Sans Me Voir; 4. Clopin-Clopant	France Disques Vogue EPL 8255
1964	Encore En Francais (sung in French)	1. Ceux Qui Ont Un Coeur (Anyone Who Had A Heart); 2. Il N'a Chante Qu'un Soir; 3. La Nuit N'en Finit Plus (Needles and Pins); 4. Prends Garde A Toi	UK Pye NEP24189
1964	Petula Clark Sings Hello Dolly In French (sung in French)	1. Hello Dolly; 2. Pourquoi Papa; 3. L'Enfant Do; 4. Toi Tu Joues a L’amour (I’m Looking At The World Through Teardrops)	UK Pye NEP 24194
1964	Les James Dean (sung in French)	1. O O Sheriff; 2. J’ai Pas Le Temps (No Go Show Boat); 3. Les James Dean; 4. Toi Qui M’as Fait Pleurer (He Was a Friend of Mine)	France Disques Vogue EPL 8294
1964	Petula Chante en Anglais	1. Downtown; 2. Let Me Tell You; 3. Be Good To Me; 4. You’d Better Love Me	France Disques Vogue EPL 8301
1965	Downtown	1. Downtown; 2. Thank You; 3. Baby It's Me; 4. True Love Never Runs Smooth	UK Pye NEP 24206
1965	Canta En Espanol	1. Que Tal, Dolly (Hello Dolly); 2. Pequeña Flor (Petite Fleur); 3. Tu No Tienes Corazon (Anyone Who Had A Heart); 4. Cantando Al Caminar (Je Chante Doucement / The Road); (Clark's Complete Vogue Recordings in Spanish)	France Disques Vogue EPL 8303
1965	Dans Le Temps (sung in French)	1. Dans Le Temps (Downtown ) 2. Puisque Tu Pars (Now That You’ve Gone); 3. Partir, Il Nous Faut (Nobody I Know); 4. Il N'y A Qu'une Femme	France Disques Vogue EPL 8310
1965	Chante En Italien (15e Festival De San Remo)	1. Invece No; 2. Non Mi Guardi Mai (L'amour Avec Un Grand 'A' / Time For Love ) 3. Se Te Ne Va; 4. La Frontiera (La Frontiere)	France Disques Vogue EPL 8323
1965	Viens Avec Moi (sung in French)	1. Viens Avec Moi (I Know A Place); 2. Regardez Les (Just Say Goodbye); 3. Que Fais-tu Là, Petula; 4. Le Coeur Qui Bat (Heart)	France Disques Vogue EPL 8342
1965	I Know A Place (Chante En English)	1. I Know A Place; 2. Jack and John; 3. Tell Me That It's Love (Est-Ce l'Amour Qui Veut Ça); 4. Music	France Disques Vogue EPL 8343
1965	Call Me	1. Call Me; 2. Heart; 3. Everything in the Garden; 4. Strangers and Lovers	UK Pye NEP 24237
1965	You'd Better Come Home	1. You'd Better Come Home; 2. You're The One; 3. Call Me; 4. Strangers And Lovers	France Disques Vogue EPL 8368
1965	Il Faut Revenir (sung in French)	1. Il Faut Revenir (You'd Better Come Home); 2. Danse Avec Moi (Dance With Me); 3. Un Jeune Homme Bien (A Well Respected Man); 4. Las Vegas	France Disques Vogue EPL 8379
1965	Va Toujours Plus Loin (sung in French)	1. Va Toujours Plus Loin (Round Every Corner); 2. Les Incorruptibles; 3. Un Mal Pour Un Bien (You're The One); 4. Le Ciel De Mon Pays (Hold On To What You've Got)	France Disques Vogue EPL 8386
1966	My Love	1. My Love; 2. Have I the Right?; 3. Round Every Corner; 4. You're the One	UK Pye NEP 24246
1966	My Love	1. My Love; 2. Every Little Bit Hurts; 3. Where Am I Going; 4. The 'In' Crowd	France Disques Vogue EPL 8408
1966	Just Say Goodbye	1. Just Say Goodbye; 2. The Life and Soul of the Party; 3. Hold On to What You've Got; 4. We Can Work It Out	UK Pye NEP 24259
1966	La Gadoue (sung in French)	1. La Gadoue; 2. La Colline Au Whisky; 3. Que Faut-il Faire Pour Oublier (There Goes My Love); 4. Folle De Toi	France Disques Vogue EPL 8410
1966	Mon Amour (sung in French)	1. Mon Amour" (My Love); 2. Que Reste-t-il (Where Do You Go); 3. L'amour Avec Un Grand "A" (Time For Love); 4. Si Tu Prenais Le Temps (A Sign of the Times)	France Disques Vogue EPL 8423
1966	A Sign of The Times	1. A Sign of The Times; 2. The Thirty-first of June; 3. The Life And Soul of the Party; 4. Time For Love (L'amour Avec Un Grand "A")	France Disques Vogue EPL 8447
1966	I Couldn't Live Without Your Love	1. I Couldn't Live Without Your Love; 2. Come Rain or Come Shine; 3. Wasn't It You; 4. A Sign of the Times	UK Pye NEP 24266
1966	I Couldn't Live Without Your Love	1. I Couldn't Live Without Your Love; 2. Monday, Monday; 3. Wasn't It You; 4. Homeward Bound	France Disques Vogue EPL 8472
1966	La Mer Est Comme Toi (sung in French)	1. La Mer Est Comme Toi; 2. L'Agent Secret; 3. Pauvre Chérie; 4. C'est Ton Affaire	France Disques Vogue EPL 8477
1966	Hello Mister Brown (sung in French)	1. Hello Mister Brown; 2. Pierrot Pendu; 3. Tout Le Monde Veut Aller Au Ciel Mais Personne Ne Veut Mourir (Everybody Wants To Go To Heaven But Nobody Wants To Die); 4. Plastic Roses	France Disques Vogue EPL 8485
1967	This is My Song	1. This is My Song; 2. I Couldn't Live Without Your Love; 3. Colour My World; 4. Who Am I	UK Pye NEP 24279
1967	C'est Ma Chanson (sung in French)	1. C'est Ma Chanson (This is My Song); 2. Tu M'as Quitte; 3. Pouquoi Dis-tu Pourquoi; 4. Meme Encore Maintenant	France Disques Vogue EPL 8508
1967	This Is My Song	1. This is My Song; 2. The Show Is Over; 3. Colour My World; 4. (I'm Begging You) Take Me Home Again	France Disques Vogue EPL 8522
1967	Don't Sleep In The Subway	1. Don't Sleep in the Subway; 2. (Softly) Here Comes The Morning; 3. On The Path Of Glory; 4. High	France Disques Vogue EPL 8569
1967	The Many Faces of Petula Clark	1. Don't Sleep in the Subway; 2. Boy from Ipanema; 3. Never on Sunday; 4. Winchester Cathedral	UK Pye NEP 24280
1967	Here, There and Everywhere	1. Here, There and Everywhere; 2. Las Vegas; 3. What Would I Be?; 4. While the Children Play	UK Pye NEP 24286
1967	The Cat In The Window	1. The Cat in the Window; 2. Las Vegas; 3. San Francisco (Be Sure To Wear Flowers In Your Hair); 4. Resist	France Disques Vogue EPL 8581
1967	La Dernière Danse (sung in French)	1. La Dernière Danse (The Last Waltz); 2. La Lune; 3. L'ile De France; 4. Absent Pour Raisons D'amour	France Disques Vogue EPL 8584
1968	L'Amour Viendra (sung in French)	1. L'Amour Viendra (My Own True Love); 2. Le Dixieland; 3. Aide-toi, Le Ciel T'aidera; 4. Tu Reviendras Vers Ta Maison (Am I That Easy to Forget)	France Disques Vogue EPL 8602
1968	Don't Give Up	1. Don't Give Up; 2. Kiss Me Goodbye; 3. The Cat in the Window; 4. The Other Man's Grass Is Always Greener	UK Pye NEP 24301
1968	Dis-moi Au Revoir (sung in French)	1. Dis-moi Au Revoir (Kiss Me Goodbye); 2. Qu'est-ce Qui Fait Courir Le Monde; 3. Dans Mon Lit (Tiny Bubbles); 4. Tu Ne Joues Plus	France Disques Vogue EPL 8618
1968	The Other Man's Grass Is Always Greener	1. The Other Man's Grass Is Always Greener; 2. Smile; 3. Answer Me, My Love; 4. I Could Have Danced All Night Long; 5. At the Crossroads; 6. The Cat in the Window	U.S. Warner Bros. S 1719 EP Stereo, 33 1/3 rpm
1968	Frère Jacques (sung in French)	1. Frère Jacques; 2. Tu Ne Sais Pas, Tu Ne Sais Rien; 3. Quant Ton Tour Viendra; 4. Chante	France Disques Vogue EPL 8647
1968	Petula	1. Have Another Dream on Me; 2. Your Love Is Everywhere; 3. One in a Million; 4. The Sun Shines out of Your Shoes; 5. Days; 6. Why Can't I Cry	U.S. Warner Bros. S 1743 EP Stereo, 33 1/3 rpm

== Singles ==
Year	Single	Peak chart positions										Sales
Year	Single	UK	AUS	CAN	FRA	GER	ITA	US BB	US CB	US AC	IRE	Sales
1949	"Put Your Shoes on Lucy" b/w "There's a House in the Sky"	—	—	—	—	—	—	—	—	—	—	
1949	"I'll Always Love You" b/w "Clancy Lowered the Boom"	—	—	—	—	—	—	—	—	—	—	
1949	"Silver Dollar"	—	—	—	—	—	—	—	—	—	—	
1950	"You Are My True Love" b/w "You're the Sweetest in the Land"	—	—	—	—	—	—	—	—	—	—	
1950	"Beloved Be Faithful" b/w "Fly Away Peter, Fly Away Paul"	—	—	—	—	—	—	—	—	—	—	
1950	"Two Lips" (duet with Benny Lee)	—	—	—	—	—	—	—	—	—	—	
1951	"Tennessee Waltz" b/w "Sleepy Eyes"	—	—	—	—	—	—	—	—	—	—	
1951	"Teasin'" b/w "Black Note Serenade"	—	—	—	—	—	—	—	—	—	—	
1951	"May Kwai" b/w "Clickety Clack"	—	—	—	—	—	—	—	—	—	—	
1951	"Mariandl" b/w "Broken Heart"	—	—	—	—	—	—	—	—	—	—	
1951	"That's How a Love Song Is Born" b/w "Cold Cold Heart"	—	—	—	—	—	—	—	—	—	—	
1951	"Tell Me Truly" b/w "Song of the Mermaid"	—	—	—	—	—	—	—	—	—	—	
1952	"It Had to Be You" b/w "The Card"	—	—	—	—	—	—	—	—	—	—	
1952	"A Boy in Love" b/w "Fly Away Peter, Fly Away Paul"	—	—	—	—	—	—	—	—	—	—	
1952	"Where Did My Snowman Go" b/w "Anytime Is Tea Time Now"	—	—	—	—	—	—	—	—	—	—	
1953	"Made in Heaven" b/w "Temptation Rag"	—	—	—	—	—	—	—	—	—	—	
1953	"My Love Is a Wanderer" b/w "Take Care of Yourself"	—	—	—	—	—	—	—	—	—	—	
1953	"Christopher Robin at Buckingham Palace" b/w "Three Little Kittens"	—	—	—	—	—	—	—	—	—	—	
1953	"Poppa Piccolino" b/w "The Who-Is-It Song"	—	—	—	—	—	—	—	—	—	—	
1954	"The Little Shoemaker" b/w "Helpless"	7	1	—	—	—	—	—	—	—	—	
1954	"Meet Me in Battersea Park" b/w "A Long Way to Go"	—	—	—	—	—	—	—	—	—	—	
1954	"Smile" b/w "Somebody"	—	—	—	—	—	—	—	—	—	—	
1954	"Little Johnny Rainbow" b/w "Christmas Cards"	—	—	—	—	—	—	—	—	—	—	
1954	"Majorca" b/w "Fascinating Rhythm"	12	—	—	—	—	—	—	—	—	—	
1955	"Romance in Rome" b/w "Chee Chee-Oo Chee (Sang the Little Bird)"	—	—	—	—	—	—	—	—	—	—	
1955	"The Pendulum Song" b/w "Crazy Otto Rag"	—	6	—	—	—	—	—	—	—	—	
1955	"How Are Things with You" b/w "Tuna Puna Trinidad"	—	—	—	—	—	—	—	—	—	—	
1955	"Suddenly There's a Valley" b/w "With Your Love"	7	—	—	—	—	—	—	—	—	—	
1956	"Band of Gold" b/w "Memories Are Made of This"	—	—	—	—	—	—	—	—	—	—	
1956	"To You, My Love" b/w "Fortune Teller"	—	—	—	—	—	—	—	—	—	—	
1956	"Another Door Opens" b/w "A Million Stars Above"	—	—	—	—	—	—	—	—	—	—	
1957	"The Sky" b/w "Who Needs You"	—	—	—	—	—	—	—	—	—	—	
1957	"With All My Heart" b/w "Gonna Find Me a Bluebird"	4	—	—	—	—	—	—	—	—	—	
1957	"Alone" b/w "Long Before I Knew You"	8	—	—	—	—	—	—	—	—	—	
1958	"Baby Lover"; UK B: "Little Blue Man"; US B: "Ever Been in Love"	12	—	—	6*	—	—	—	—	—	—	
1958	"Love Me Again" b/w "In a Little Moment"	—	—	—	—	—	—	—	—	—	—	
1958	"Devotion" b/w "St. Tropez (Sur La Plague/On the Beach)"	—	—	—	—	—	—	—	—	—	—	
1958	"Fibbin'" b/w "I Wish I Knew"	—	—	—	—	—	—	—	—	—	—	
1959	"Ever Been in Love" b/w "Lucky Day"	—	—	—	—	—	—	—	—	—	—	
1959	"Watch Your Heart" b/w "Suddenly"	—	—	—	—	—	—	—	—	—	—	
1959	"Where Do I Go from Here" b/w "Mama's Talking Soft"	—	—	—	—	—	—	—	—	—	—	
1959	"Adonis" b/w "If I Had My Way"	—	—	—	—	—	—	—	—	—	—	
1959	"Prends Mon Coeur"	—	—	—	9*	—	—	—	—	—	—	
1959	"Dear Daddy" b/w "Through the Livelong Day"	—	—	—	—	—	—	—	—	—	—	
1960	"I Love a Violin"; UK B: "Guitare Et Tambourin"; US B: "(Where Are You) Now That I Need You"	—	—	—	—	—	—	—	—	—	—	
1960	"Cinderella Jones" b/w "All Over Now"	—	—	—	—	—	—	—	—	—	—	
1961	"Sailor" (FR: "Marin") b/w "My Heart"	1	98	—	2*	—	—	—	—	—	—	UK: 250,000
1961	"Something's Missing" b/w "Isn't This a Lovely Day?"	44	—	—	—	—	—	—	—	—	—	
1961	"Garde-moi la Dernière Danse"	—	—	—	3*	—	—	—	—	—	—	
1961	"Welcome Home" b/w "Les Gens Diront"	—	—	—	—	—	—	—	—	—	—	
1961	"Romeo"; UK B: "You're Getting to Be a Habit with Me"; US B: "Isn't This a Lovely Day"	3	25	—	1	—	—	—	—	—	—	
1961	"My Friend the Sea" b/w "With All My Love"	7	44	—	—	—	—	—	—	—	—	
1962	"I Will Follow Him (Chariot)" (GER: "Cheerio", IT: "Sul Mio Carro") b/w "Darling Cheri"	—	—	—	2	6*	1*	—	—	—	—	
1962	"Monsieur"	—	—	—	—	1*	1*	—	—	—	—	
1962	"I'm Counting on You" b/w "Some Other World"	41	—	—	—	—	—	—	—	—	—	
1962	"Whistlin' for the Moon" b/w "Tender Love"	—	66	—	—	—	—	—	—	—	—	
1962	"Ya Ya Twist" b/w "Si C'est Oui, C'est Oui"	14	—	—	1	—	—	—	—	—	—	
1962	"Jumble Sale" b/w "Too Late"	—	—	—	—	—	—	—	—	—	—	
1962	"The Road"; UK B: "No Love, No Nothin'"; US B: "Jumble Sale"	—	—	—	—	—	—	—	—	—	—	
1963	"Valentino" b/w "Imagination"	—	—	—	—	—	—	—	—	—	—	
1963	"Let Me Tell You" b/w "Be Good to Me"	—	—	—	—	—	—	—	—	—	—	
1963	"Baby It's Me" b/w "This Is Goodbye"	—	—	—	—	—	—	—	—	—	—	
1963	"Les Beaux Jours"	—	—	—	10*	—	—	—	—	—	—	
1963	"Cœur Blessé"	—	—	—	1*	—	—	—	—	—	—	
1963	"Casanova" (GER: "Casanova Baciami") b/w "Chariot"	39	—	—	—	2*	—	—	—	—	—	
1963	"Dance On" (FR: "Je me sens bien auprès de toi")	—	—	—	3*	—	—	—	—	—	—	
1964	"Thank You" b/w "Crying Through a Sleepless Night"	—	—	—	—	—	—	—	—	—	—	
1964	"In Love"; UK B: "Forgetting You"; US B: "The Road"	—	—	—	—	—	—	—	—	—	—	
1964	"True Love Never Runs Smooth" b/w "Saturday Sunshine"	—	—	—	—	—	—	—	—	—	—	
1964	"Downtown" (IT: "Ciao, Ciao", FR: "Dans le temps") b/w "You'd Better Love Me"	2	1	1	6*	1*	1*	1	1	—	2	UK: 250,000; US: 1,600,000
1964	"Anyone Who Had a Heart" (FR: "Ceux qui ont un cœur", GER: "Alles ist nun vorbei", IT: "Quelli che hanno un cuore")	—	—	—	7*	37*	5*	—	—	—	—	
1965	"Invece no"	—	—	—	—	—	5*	—	—	—	—	
1965	"I Know a Place" (FR: "Viens avec moi") b/w "Jack and John"	17	7	1	8*	35	—	3	2	16	—	US: 750,000
1965	"You'd Better Come Home" b/w "Heart"	44	54	11	—	—	—	22	25	4	—	
1965	"Round Every Corner" (IT: "Gocce di mare") b/w "Two Rivers"	43	70	6	—	—	10*	21	23	—	—	
1965	"You're the One" (FR: "Un Mal Pour Un Bien"; GER: "Deine Liebe ist wunderbar") b/w "Gotta Tell the World"	23	4	—	6*	—	—	—	—	—	—	
1965	"My Love" (FR: "Mon Amour", IT: "L'amore e il vento", GER: Verzeih die dummen Tränen) b/w "Where Am I Going"	4	4	1	12*	13; 21*	24*	1	2	4	6	US: 840,000
1966	"Kann Ich dir vertrauen?"	—	—	—	—	17*	—	—	—	—	—	
1966	"A Sign of the Times" b/w "Time for Love"	49	11	8	—	—	—	11	15	2	—	
1966	"I Couldn't Live Without Your Love" (GER: "So wunderbar, verliebt zu sein") b/w "Your Way of Life"	6	11	6	—	28*	—	9	8	1	—	
1966	"Who Am I" b/w "Love Is a Long Journey"	52	42	14	—	—	—	21	22	31	—	
1966	"Si Tu Prenais Le Temps" b/w "L'amour Avec Un Grand "A""	—	—	—	—	—	—	—	—	—	—	
1967	"Colour My World"; UK B: "I'm Begging You"; US B: "Take Me Home Again"	53	10	14	—	—	—	16	18	10	—	
1967	"This Is My Song" (FR: "C'est Ma Chanson", GER: "Love – so heißt mein Song", IT: "Cara Felicita"); UK B: "The Show Is Over"; US B: "High"	1	1	4	1*	16; 23*	1*	3	5	2	1	
1967	"The Last Waltz" (FR: "La dernière valse")	—	—	—	2*	—	—	—	—	—	—	
1967	"Don't Sleep in the Subway" b/w "Here Comes the Morning"	12	1	5	—	—	—	5	6	1	—	
1967	"The Cat in the Window (The Bird in the Sky)" b/w "Fancy Dancin' Man"	66	19	35	—	—	—	26	27	9	—	
1968	"The Other Man's Grass Is Always Greener" b/w "At the Crossroads"	20	29	12	—	—	—	31	28	3	—	
1968	"Kiss Me Goodbye" b/w "I've Got Love Going for Me"	50	14	10	—	36	26	15	12	2	—	
1968	"Don't Give Up" b/w "Every Time I See a Rainbow"	—	43	23	—	—	—	37	27	5	—	
1968	"American Boys (Take Good Care of Your Heart)" b/w "Look to the Sky"	—	—	37	—	—	—	59	49	18	—	
1968	"I Want to Sing with Your Band" b/w "Look to the Sky"	—	20	—	—	—	—	—	—	—	—	
1969	"Happy Heart" b/w "Love Is the Only Thing"	—	22	62	—	—	—	62	71	12	—	
1969	"Look at Mine" b/w "You and I"	—	42	43	—	—	—	89	62	14	—	
1969	"No One Better Than You" b/w "Things Bright and Beautiful"	—	—	64	—	—	—	93	91	18	—	
1970	"The Song Is Love" b/w "Beautiful Sounds"	—	—	—	—	—	—	—	—	19	—	
1970	"Melody Man" b/w "Big Love Sale"	—	28	—	—	—	—	—	—	—	—	
1971	"The Song of My Life" (FR: "C'est La Refrain De Ma Vie"); UK B: "For Love"; US B: "Couldn't Sleep"	32	44	—	11*	—	—	—	—	—	—	
1971	"I Don't Know How to Love Him"; UK B: "Song Went Wrong"; US B: "Maybe"	47	—	—	—	—	—	—	—	—	—	
1971	"The World Song" b/w "I Know What Love Is About"	—	—	—	—	—	—	—	—	—	—	
1972	"My Guy" b/w "Little Bit of Lovin'"	—	—	—	—	—	—	70	89	12	—	
1972	"The Wedding Song (There Is Love)" b/w "Song Without End"	—	10	67	—	—	—	61	77	9	—	
1973	"I Can't Remember (How It Was Before)" b/w "Serenade of Love"	—	—	—	—	—	—	—	—	—	—	
1973	"Gratification" b/w "I Can't Remember (How It Was Before)"	—	—	—	—	—	—	—	—	—	—	
1973	"Lead Me On" b/w "Taking It On"; Both sides with Sacha Distel	—	—	—	—	—	—	—	—	—	—	
1973	"Silver Spoon" b/w "Fixing to Live"	—	—	—	—	—	—	—	—	—	—	
1974	"Never Been a Horse That Couldn't Be Rode" b/w "I'm the Woman You Need"	—	—	—	—	—	—	—	—	—	—	
1974	"Let's Sing a Love Song" b/w "I'm the Woman You Need"	—	—	—	—	—	—	—	—	—	—	
1974	"The Old Fashioned Way" b/w "Come On Home"	—	—	—	—	—	—	—	—	40	—	
1974	"Loving Arms" b/w "I'm the Woman You Need"	—	—	—	—	—	—	—	—	12	—	
1974	"I Am Your Song" b/w "Super Loving Lady"	—	—	—	—	—	—	—	—	—	—	
1974	"Wind of Change" b/w "Memories Are Made of This"	—	—	—	—	—	—	—	—	—	—	
1974	"What I Did for Love" b/w "I Believe in Love"	—	—	—	—	—	—	—	—	—	—	
1977	"Downtown '77" b/w "Two Rivers"	—	—	—	—	—	—	—	—	—	—	
1977	"Don't Cry for Me Argentina" (FR: "La Chanson d'Evita")	—	—	—	8*	—	—	—	—	—	—	
1978	"I'm Not in Love" b/w "What Am I Doing Here"	—	—	—	—	—	—	—	—	—	—	
1978	"Put a Little Sunbeam in Your Life" b/w "Songbird"	—	—	—	—	—	—	—	—	—	—	
1978	"Just a Dance with Time" b/w "Don't Stop the Music"	—	—	—	—	—	—	—	—	—	—	
1981	"Natural Love"^{[A]} b/w "Because I Love Him"	—	—	—	—	—	—	66	—	24	—	
1981	"Edelweiss" b/w "Darkness"	—	—	—	—	—	—	—	—	—	—	
1981	"Blue Eyes Crying in the Rain" b/w "Love Won't Always Pass You By"	—	—	—	—	—	—	—	—	—	—	
1982	"Dreamin' with My Eyes Wide Open" b/w "After Glow"	—	—	—	—	—	—	—	—	—	—	
1985	"Mister Orwell" b/w "Glamoureuse"	—	—	—	—	—	—	—	—	—	—	
1988	"Life's a Game" b/w "How"	—	—	—	—	—	—	—	—	—	—	
1988	"Downtown '88" b/w original version of A-side	10	58	—	—	13	—	—	—	—	14	
1989	"I Couldn't Live Without Your Love '89" b/w "Come On Home"	—	—	—	—	—	—	—	—	—	—	
1990	"Someone Like You" (duet with Dave Willetts) b/w "Getting the Right Thing Wrong"	—	—	—	—	—	—	—	—	—	—	
1992	"Oxygen"	—	—	—	—	—	—	—	—	—	—	
2011	"Downtown" (The Saw Doctors featuring Petula Clark); CD single	—	—	—	—	—	—	—	—	—	2	
2012	"Cut Copy Me"^{[B]}	—	—	—	—	—	—	—	—	—	—	
2013	"Never Enough"	—	—	—	—	—	—	—	—	—	—	
"—" denotes releases that did not chart												

* songs with lyrics not in English

=== Notes ===
- A "Natural Love" also peaked at #20 on the US Hot Country Singles & Tracks chart.
- B "Cut Copy Me" reached #21 on the Belgian charts, and is currently Clark's most recent charting single in any territory.
