= Petula Clark's Hit Parade =

Greatest hits album by Petula Clark
- Released: 1966
- Recorded: London, UK
- Genre: British Invasion, pop, vocal
- Length: 33:45
- Label: Pye NPL 18159 Mono; NSPL 18159 Stereo
- Producer: Tony Hatch

Petula Clark chronology
I Couldn't Live Without Your Love (1966)	Petula Clark's Hit Parade (1966)	Colour My World/Who Am I (1967)

Petula Clark's Hit Parade is a compilation album of Clark's biggest hits to date. This unofficial 'greatest hits' album released on Clark's British label Pye, was only released in the UK however. The US wouldn't see a 'greatest hits' until Warner Bros. released Petula Clark's Greatest Hits, Vol. 1 at the end of 1968. Two of Clark's hit singles, previously unreleased on an LP were included on the Hit Parade album; "Round Every Corner" (#21 US) and "You'd Better Come Home" (#22 US). The album is largely a collection of Tony Hatch's arrangements and songwriting.

== Track listing ==
Side one
No.	Title	Writer(s)	Length
1.	"A Sign of the Times"	Tony Hatch	2:55
2.	"My Love"	Tony Hatch	2:43
3.	"Heart"	Tony Hatch, Petula Clark, Georges Aber	2:37
4.	"I Couldn't Live Without Your Love"	Tony Hatch, Jackie Trent	2:55
5.	"You'd Better Come Home"	Tony Hatch	2:51
6.	"You're The One"	Tony Hatch, Petula Clark	2:26

Side two
No.	Title	Writer(s)	Length
1.	"I Know a Place"	Tony Hatch, Petula Clark	3:05
2.	"Just Say Goodbye"	Tony Hatch, Petula Clark, Pierre Delanoë	2:42
3.	"Round Every Corner"	Tony Hatch	2:36
4.	"Where Did We Go Wrong"	Tony Hatch, Petula Clark	3:05
5.	"Call Me"	Tony Hatch	2:46
6.	"Downtown"	Tony Hatch	3:05

== Personnel ==
- Petula Clark - lead vocals
- Tony Hatch - arranger, orchestra director
- Johnny Harris - arranger, orchestra director

== Charts ==
Chart (1966)	Peak position
UK Albums (OCC)	18
