= Then & Now: The Very Best of Petula Clark =

Greatest hits album by Petula Clark
- Released: 16 June 2008
- Genre: Pop
- Label: UMTV

Then & Now: The Very Best of Petula Clark is a compilation album by British singer Petula Clark that was released on 16 June 2008. It's a collection of greatest hits, four newly recorded tracks, and a previously unreleased recording.

Following heavy promotion on radio, television and in the press, the CD sold 10,535 copies in its first week of release and debuted at #17 on the UK Albums Chart. In recognition of sales in excess of 60,000, it has been awarded a Silver Disc by BPI.

== Track listing ==
1. "Downtown"
2. "Sailor"
3. "I Couldn't Live Without Your Love"
4. "This is My Song"
5. "Don't Sleep in the Subway"
6. "I Know a Place"
7. "Call Me"
8. "With All My Heart"
9. "Romeo"
10. "You're the One"
11. "My Love"
12. "Who Am I"
13. "The Other Man's Grass Is Always Greener"
14. "Kiss Me Goodbye"
15. "People Get Ready"
16. "Maybe I'm Amazed"
17. "When You Get Right Down to It" (duet with Michael McDonald)
18. "These Are the Days of Our Lives"
19. "Memories of Love"
20. "La Vie en Rose"
21. "Come Along with Me"
22. "Heaven's Door"
23. "It's OK (I Believe in You)"
24. "To Memphis"
25. "Corner of the Sky" (duet with Dusty Springfield)
