= Shout! The Mod Musical =

2000 musical by Phillip George and David Lowenstein

SHOUT! The Mod Musical is an off-Broadway musical by Phillip George and David Lowenstein featuring songs from the swinging sixties. The musical features five female singers who are called, Orange, Blue, Green, Yellow and Red.

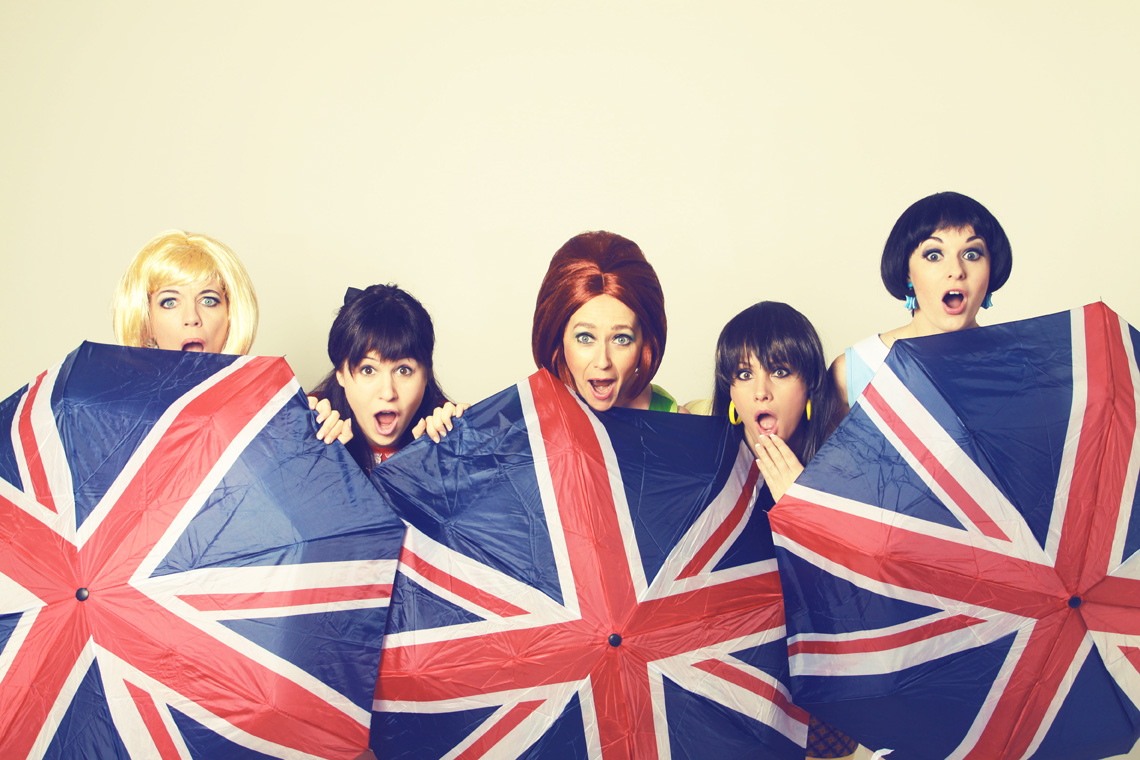
Shout! The Mod Musical

== Storyline ==
The show is set in London between the early 1960s and 1970, and follows the lives of five women in their 20s (The Red Girl), 30s (Green, Blue, and Yellow girls) and 40s (Orange girl) who all face tough situations, usually involving relationships. Throughout the story, all five women send letters to Gwendolyn Holmes, who works for the magazine Shout! in an advice column and who gives them advice on how to deal with these situations.

The Yellow girl is the only American character in the show, who traveled all the way to Britain in order to see Paul McCartney. The Orange woman is shown as a full grown woman who is married, in her forties, and is starting to suspect her husband is cheating on her. The Blue girl is gorgeous and wealthy, and while she can go on and on about how perfect her life is, she does face some questions regarding her sexuality. The Green girl is the classic sexually charged "racey" character in the show, always hooking up with men and throwing innuendos around. Finally, the Red girl is the youngest and most hopeful character; she is a bit hopeless in the beginning, stating she is not good-looking like other girls, until the man of her dreams comes along.

== Synopsis ==
Five women look for excitement and love ("Opening Medley"). Rather than being named, they are identified by the color that they wear for the majority of the show. The orange girl is the oldest, who is the matriarch of the group that is in denial about her husband cheating on her. The red girl is insecure about her looks, and she is the youngest of the group. The blue girl is a beauty, and she does not have any friends due to her vanity. The green girl is slutty, and the yellow girl is loud and brass. The yellow girl is also American. Although the five girls are very different, they all have one thing on their mind: "Love (Talk About Love)".

The girls all look to a fictional magazine called Shout! for advice, particularly the columnist named Gwendolyn Holmes (a voiceover role played by Carole Shelley). The orange girl asks Gwendolyn if she should rush into marriage, and Gwendolyn agrees that she should. Orange sings about how she only has eyes for Miles, his current boyfriend ("I Only Wanna Be With You" / "Tell the Boys").

The red girl has just gotten a boyfriend named Edward, but she is suspicious, and writes to Gwendolyn for advice. Gwendolyn suggests a beauty pageant, which causes the girls to wonder how to get a man ("How Can You Tell" / "Wishin' and Hopin'").

The blue girl acts out an advertisement for Ecotcil.

As the green girl sings about falling in love ("One, Two, Three"), the yellow girl stalks Paul McCartney, and gets his half broken comb with his dandruff on it, and the red girl sings about her own coming of age ("To Sir With Love").

The red girl acts out an advertisement of a birth control pill, with some nasty side effects. The green woman reads that 73% of women get anxiety when breaking up with men, and swears that it is easy, sharing some of her tactics.

Orange waits for her husband for their second anniversary, but it is of no avail ("Wives and Lovers" / "My Handsome Prince").

Blue discusses how she does not care about her suitors, and has no attachment to them ("Don't Sleep In The Subway").

Yellow sings about her feelings towards Billy Ray, an old fling ("Son of a Preacher Man").

After Shout! tells them the truth about marijuana, the girls smoke weed and sing "James Bond's Theme" and "Goldfinger", changing it to "Coldfinger", about the man with the freezing touch.

Orange is getting more and more angry with Miles, and is begging him to spend time with her, even if he is not as affectionate as he once was ("You Don't Have to Say You Love Me"). Blue decides she prefers diamonds over men ("Diamonds Are Forever"), and Red sings her devotion to Edward ("Puppet on a String"). Green writes to Gwendolyn about breaking up with her boyfriend because he is bad in bed, and Gwendolyn says that, as a woman, Green should not care about that. Times are changing for these young women, and they know it ("Georgy Girl" / "Windy").

The red girl talks about an embarrassing moment with her boyfriend, but her boyfriend keeps loving her anyways ("Who Am I"). Orange sings ("Don't Give Up"). Blue is upset about not being girl of the year, and yellow is upset that Paul McCartney is married ("I Just Don't Know What To Do With Myself").

After checking their horoscopes and gaining a new style (Notably, Orange is now wearing Purple), they sing a rousing number ("These Boots Are Made For Walkin'").

Blue turns to Gwendolyn Holmes, admitting that she has never felt attraction to boys, particularly not the one she is currently dating, but Gwendolyn does not help. The girls take a quiz regarding their love life, but it is revealed that Blue's true love is a woman named Penelope, and that Green has feelings for one man, whom she wants to marry ("I Couldn't Live Without Your Love"). Yellow reveals that her husband, a Paul McCartney lookalike, is hitting her, and she now has a baby on the way, but Gwendolyn tells her that she should go to a marriage counsellor rather than breaking it off.

Blue and Orange sing about their own loves ("You're My World" / "All I See Is You").

It is now the 1970s ("Those Were The Days"). Orange gets Gwendolyn fired, and they celebrate ("Shout!"). In the end, they discuss their futures (Orange replaced Gwendolyn, Red became a teacher, Blue became an actress, Green became an airline stewardess, and Yellow became an abuse counsellor), and they are glad to have been a part of the 1960s ("Goin' Back" / "Downtown").

== Songs included ==
Songs in the show include "Don't Sleep in the Subway", "These Boots Are Made for Walkin'", "To Sir, With Love", "Downtown", and several other hits from the 1960s.

== Original cast ==
- Yellow Girl: Erin Crosby
- Red Girl: Denise Summerford
- Orange Girl: Julie Dingman-Evans
- Blue Girl: Marie-France Arcilla
- Green Girl: Erica Schroeder
