= My Love (Petula Clark album) =

- US (Warner Bros.) cover

Studio album by Petula Clark
- Released: 1966
- Recorded: 1965–1966
- Studio: Western Studios, Los Angeles; Pye Studios, Marble Arch, London
- Genre: Pop
- Length: 31:46
- Label: Disques Vogue (France); Pye Records (UK); Warner Bros. Records (U.S.)
- Producer: Tony Hatch

Petula Clark chronology
The World's Greatest International Hits (1965)	My Love (1966)	I Couldn't Live Without Your Love (1966)

Singles from My Love
- 1. "My Love" Released: December 1965; 2. "Sign of the Times" Released: March 1966

Professional ratings
Review scores
Source	Rating
Allmusic	3/5 stars
Record Mirror	4/5 stars

My Love is an album released by Petula Clark; her first album to feature recording done in the United States, My Love was produced, arranged, and conducted by Tony Hatch. In the US, it was her fourth album licensed to Warner Bros. Records. After the single release of "A Sign of the Times" charted, new pressings of the album were titled A Sign of the Times/My Love.

== Overview ==
The My Love album is widely considered to be a qualitative high point in Clark's career. Record Collector called it "her musical masterwork" in May 1993. In 1990 Goldmine claimed that "this album encapsulates the sound of popular music in the mid 1960s."

In the US, My Love entered the Billboard 200 9 April 1966 to chart for twelve weeks with a No. 68 peak. Despite being the first of Clark's Warner Bros. album releases to feature two major hits including the #1 title cut, My Love represented a drop in popularity from the precedent I Know A Place, which has similarly charted lower than Clark's US album debut, Downtown, demonstrating that Clark would be primarily successful as a singles artist. My Love did not reach the UK Top 20 Album chart, despite the LP meeting with positive critical reaction at the time and growing esteem since. Billboard magazine, in March 1966, called it "a solid pop package."

Clark recorded the album at both Western Studios in Los Angeles – where the title cut was recorded – and at Pye Studios in Marble Arch. Clark was backed at Western Studios by the Wrecking Crew while the session personnel at Pye Studios included drummer Bobby Graham, guitarist Big Jim Sullivan, and the Breakaways vocal group.

My Love follows the formula of the Downtown LP in that it features almost all original material; the only cover version is the Beatles' "We Can Work It Out". The balance of the album comprises nine Hatch compositions (with Clark a co-writer on five), the first known recording of Randy Newman's "I Can't Remember (Ever Loving You)", and "If I Were a Bell", allowing Clark her penchant for show tunes.

"Life and Soul of the Party" was intended to be the lead single, but writer Tony Hatch was incorrectly told by an American that the term meant nothing in the States. In its original review of the album, "Billboard" encouraged Warner Brothers to release "Life and Soul" as a single. Also not a single, the dramatic ballad "Just Say Goodbye" was performed by Clark on The Ed Sullivan Show and The Hollywood Palace. It appears on more than one of her greatest hits compilations.

== Track listing ==
Side one

1. "My Love" (Tony Hatch) – 2:43
2. "Hold on to What You've Got" (Tony Hatch, Petula Clark, Pierre Delanoë) – 2:37
3. "We Can Work It Out" (John Lennon, Paul McCartney) – 2:51
4. "Time for Love" (Tony Hatch, Petula Clark, Vito Pallavicini) – 2:15
5. "Just Say Goodbye" (Tony Hatch, Petula Clark, Pierre Delanöe) – 2:42
6. "The Life and Soul of the Party" (Tony Hatch) – 2:59

Side two

1. "A Sign of the Times" (Tony Hatch) – 2:55
2. "The Thirty-First of June" (Tony Hatch) – 2:51
3. "Where Did We Go Wrong" (Tony Hatch, Petula Clark) – 3:05
4. "I Can't Remember Ever Loving You" (Randy Newman, Janis Walner) – 2:04
5. "Dance with Me" (Tony Hatch, Petula Clark, Hubert Ballay) – 2:33
6. "If I Were a Bell" from Guys and Dolls (Frank Loesser) – 2:16
