= Colour My World =

Colour My World or Color My World may refer to:

- Colour My World (album), a 1967 album by Petula Clark
  - "Colour My World" (Petula Clark song), a 1966 song by Petula Clark
- "Colour My World" (Chicago song), a 1970 song by Chicago
- Colour My World, a song by Westlife from the 2005 album Face to Face
- Colour My World, a set of four handguns used by Bayonetta in the video game Bayonetta 3
- "Colour My Word", an episode of the TV series Pocoyo
