= Sign of the Times (Petula Clark song) =

Single by Petula Clark

from the album My Love
- B-side: "Time for Love"
- Released: March 1966
- Recorded: 1966
- Genre: Pop
- Length: 2:55
- Label: Pye 7N 17071 (UK); Warner Bros. (US); Vogue STU 42223 (DEN)
- Songwriters: Tony Hatch; Jackie Trent
- Producer: Tony Hatch

Petula Clark singles chronology
"My Love" (1965)	"Sign of the Times" (1966)	"I Couldn't Live Without Your Love" (1966)

"Sign of the Times", also known as "A Sign of the Times", is a song performed by Petula Clark, featured on her album My Love and released as a single in March 1966. It was the follow-up to her #1 US hit "My Love," the title track from the aforementioned album, and it continued her association with writer/producer Tony Hatch and songwriter Jackie Trent. However, "Sign of the Times" had a more percussive sound than had been evident in Clark's previous singles, or that become evident in her later ones.

== Single and chart performance ==
The song was recorded at the Pye Studios in Marble Arch in a session which featured guitarist Big Jim Sullivan and the Breakaways vocal group.

Clark introduced "A Sign of the Times" on The Ed Sullivan Show broadcast on 27 February 1966. The single would debut on the Billboard Hot 100 dated 26 March 1966 and reached its peak of #11 on 23 April. It peaked at #2 on Billboard's "Easy Listening" survey.

Beginning with her American breakout, "Downtown," Clark's singles had all had higher chart peaks in the US than in the UK. (The 1966 #23 UK hit "You're the One" was not released in the US.) "A Sign of the Times" became the most extreme example of this discrepancy by spending only one week – that of 27 April 1966 – in the UK Top 50 at #49. Although this trend was reversed with Clark's next single: "I Couldn't Live Without Your Love" (UK #6/US #9), Clark's last two 1966 single releases: "Who Am I?" (US #21) and "Colour My World" (US #16) both failed to rank in the UK Top 50.

"A Sign of the Times" was a hit in Australia (#11) and South Africa (#2).

=== Live CD ===
"A Sign of the Times" also served as the title cut for a live CD by Petula Clark released by Varèse Sarabande 13 November 2001 comprising footage from her concert dates at Chrysler Hall in Norfolk, Virginia on 20 and 21 May 2001 featuring guests Richard Carpenter and Lou Rawls.

Track listing:

1. "A Sign Of The Times"
2. "I’m Not Afraid"
3. "At Last" (with Lou Rawls)
4. "Downtown"
5. "I Dreamed A Dream"
6. "Don’t Give Up"
7. "I Need To Be In Love" (with Richard Carpenter)
8. "The Wedding Song (There Is Love)"
9. "With One Look"
10. "Celebrate"
11. "I Couldn’t Live Without Your Love" (with Lou Rawls and Richard Carpenter)
12. "Here For You"
13. "Look For The Silver Lining"
14. "Vivre" (Notre Dame de Paris)

=== Reuse ===
- The Chrysler Hall engagement was also broadcast by PBS as the television special Petula Clark: A Sign of the Times which – augmented with archive footage from Clark's career – was released on DVD 26 March 2002.
- In 1969 B.F. Goodrich utilized the tune to "A Sign of the Times" for TV commercials advertising radial tires: the lyric was adjusted from "It's a sign of the times" to "It's the radial age".
- In 1999 Target department store ran a series of television commercials featuring "A Sign of the Times." The song's use as a jingle for Target was masterminded by the company's marketing director John Pellegrene who had been responsible for "A Sign of the Times" being used in the 1960s B.F. Goodrich ad campaign. This campaign was famous for also introducing Target's iconic mascot, Bullseye. The ad was discontinued the next year, thus removing the song from the ads.
- A brief clip of "A Sign of the Times" was used on Dickie Goodman's 1966 novelty record Batman and his Grandmother.

=== 2001 alleged "banning" ===
In 2001, the radio and media company Clear Channel Communications listed "A Sign of the Times" on an advisory list of records that stations might voluntarily choose to avoid playing—on a temporary basis—in the wake of the September 11 terrorist attacks, the title possibly being construed to refer to a portent of the end of the world.

== Other version ==
- An instrumental version by King Richard's Fluegel Knights was an Easy Listening hit reaching #19 on the Easy Listening chart in Billboard magazine in September 1966. King Richard's Fluegel Knights was a session group led by Bob Thompson and Richard Behrke.
