= Why Don't They Understand =

Single by George Hamilton IV
- B-side: "Even Tho'"
- Released: October 1957
- Genre: Traditional pop
- Length: 2:30
- Label: ABC-Paramount
- Songwriter(s): Jack Fishman, Joe "Mr Piano" Henderson

George Hamilton IV singles chronology
"High School Romance" (1957)	"Why Don't They Understand" (1957)	"Now and for Always" (1958)

"Why Don't They Understand" is a song written by Jack Fishman and Joe Henderson, which became a hit when recorded by George Hamilton IV. It reached number 10 on the U.S. pop chart, number 22 on the UK Singles Chart, and number 18 in Canada in 1958.

The single was arranged by Don Costa.

== Other charting versions ==
- Bobby Vinton released a version which reached number 23 on the adult contemporary chart and number 109 on the U.S. pop chart in 1970.

== Other versions ==
- Glen Mason released a version of the song as the B-side to his 1957 single "Crying My Heart Out for You".
- Victor Silvester and His Ballroom Orchestra released a version of the song as the B-side to his 1958 single "The Story of My Life".
- Lem Winchester released a version of the song on his 1960 album With Feeling.
- The Anita Kerr Singers released a version of the song on their 1963 album Tender Words. It was produced by Chet Atkins.
- Bobby Goldsboro included it on his 1964 album The Bobby Goldsboro Album.
- Wink Martindale released a version of the song as the B-side to his 1964 single "Big Buildin'".
- Dave Berry released a version of the song on his 1965 EP Can I Get It from You.
- Petula Clark released a version of the song on her 1965 album The World's Greatest International Hits! It was produced by Tony Hatch.
- Cliff Richard released a version of the song on his 1965 EP Why Don't They Understand.
- Patty Duke released a version of the song on her 1966 album Patty Duke's Greatest Hits.
- Don Spencer released a version of the song as a single in 1966, but it did not chart.
- Frankie Avalon released a version of the song as the B-side to his 1969 single "For Your Love". It was produced by Jimmy Bowen.
- The Williams Brothers released a version of the song on their 2002 compilation album Andy & David.
