= Meet The Vogues =

Meet the Vogues

Studio album by The Vogues
- Released: December 1965
- Genre: Pop, rock
- Label: Co & Ce
- Producer: Jack Hakim; Nick Cenci

The Vogues chronology
| Meet the Vogues (1965) | Five O'Clock World (1966) |

Meet the Vogues is the debut album by The Vogues. It was released in 1965 on a small Pittsburgh-based label called Co & Ce Records, co-founded by Herb Cohen and Nick Cenci. It features their first hit single, "You're the One", a cover of a song originally recorded by Petula Clark, plus eleven other covers of recent popular songs.

== Track listing ==
| Track | Title | Songwriter(s) |
|---|---|---|
| 1 | "You're the One" | Petula Clark/Tony Hatch |
| 2 | "Hang On Sloopy" | Wes Farrell/Bert Russell |
| 3 | "Make It Easy on Yourself" | Burt Bacharach/Hal David |
| 4 | "Catch Us If You Can" | Dave Clark/Lenny Davidson |
| 5 | "Baby Don't Go" | Sonny Bono |
| 6 | "You Were on My Mind" | Sylvia Tyson |
| 7 | "1-2-3" | Len Barry/John Madara/David White |
| 8 | "Ain't That Just Like Me" | Earl Carroll/Billy Guy |
| 9 | "My Girl" | Smokey Robinson/Ronald White |
| 10 | "It's Not Unusual" | Les Reed/Gordon Mills |
| 11 | "Nothing to Offer You" | Herbert Cohen/Sebastian DiNunzio Jr. |
| 12 | "A Lover's Concerto" | Sandy Linzer, Denny Randell |
