= Who Am I (Petula Clark song) =

Single by Petula Clark

from the album Colour My World
- B-side: "Love Is a Long Journey" (non-LP track)
- Released: October 1966
- Recorded: 1966
- Genre: Pop
- Length: 2:20
- Label: Pye 7N 17187 (UK); Warner Bros. 5863 (US); Vogue DV 14580 (GER)
- Songwriters: Tony Hatch, Jackie Trent
- Producer: Tony Hatch

Petula Clark singles chronology
"I Couldn't Live Without Your Love" (1966)	"Who Am I" (1966)	"Colour My World" (1966)

"Who Am I" is a 1966 single by Petula Clark written by Tony Hatch & Jackie Trent and produced by Tony Hatch. By virtue of its title, "Who Am I" has long been the standard opening number for Clark's concerts. It also served as the centerpiece for the "Who Am I Medley", which opened Clark's 1968 U.S. television special.

A follow-up to the transatlantic Top Ten hit "I Couldn't Live Without Your Love", "Who Am I" peaked at No. 21 in the US in November 1966 and failed to chart in Clark's native UK, as did the follow-up US Top 20 single "Color My World". "Who Am I " was Clark's first post-"Downtown" single which did not chart in the UK. During this 1965–66 period, three US hits — "You'd Better Come Home", "Round Every Corner" and "A Sign Of The Times" — did not crack the UK Top 40. "Who Am I" was symptomatic of a run of singles that on the whole proved far more successful in the States. Clark broke the spell in early 1967 with the release of "This Is My Song" – a UK No. 1. In Australia "Who Am I" reached No. 42.

== Background ==
Although largely conforming to the formula established by Clark's previous work with Hatch, "Who Am I" is distinct in its referencing concerns of the 1960s social consciousness, specifically the search for the meaning of life. The November 1967 issue of High Fidelity magazine featured an essay by Canadian pianist Glenn Gould: The Search for Petula Clark, which Gould was moved to write after hearing "Who Am I" on his car radio, the song striking him as a "document of despair [which] catalogues [the] symptoms of disenchantment and ennui" in contrast to the buoyancy expressed in Clark's earlier hits "Downtown", "My Love" and "A Sign of the Times". Gould later observed his essay used Petula Clark "as a jumping off point to examine the whole so-called flower-child generation of the mid-60s." "Who Am I" acknowledges the mid-1960s baroque vogue in its incorporation of a harpsichord in its instrumentation. Billboard magazine's original review predicted the song would make the top 20 of the Hot 100. "More powerhouse hit material from the dynamic duo, Clark and Hatch. Will have no trouble picking up where "I Couldn't Live Without Your Love" left off."

== Chart performance ==
Chart (1966)	Peak position
Australia	42
US Billboard Hot 100	21
US Billboard Easy Listening	31

== Cover versions ==
- Shirley Bassey recorded "Who Am I" for her 1968 album This is My Life.
- The 1967 album release Pet Project by the Bob Florence Big Band features an instrumental version of "Who Am I", the album being devoted to songs associated with Petula Clark.
- Also Canadian flautist and saxophonist Moe Koffman recorded an instrumental version for his 1996 album Devil's Brew.
