= From Now On =

From Now On may refer to:

== Music ==
=== Albums ===
- From Now On (Jaki Graham album) or the title song, 1989
- From Now On (Robin S. album), 1997
- From Now On (Sonny Fortune album) or the title song, 1996
- From Now On (Will Young album) or the title song, 2002
- From Now On..., by Glenn Hughes, or the title song, 1994
- From Now On (EP), by Dreezy, or the title song, 2015
- From Now On, by Petula Clark, 2016
- From Now On New Songs + Best Selection, by Nicholas Teo, 2008

=== Songs ===
- "From Now On" (Lil Baby song), 2022
- "From Now On", by Band-Maid from Unleash, 2022
- "From Now On", by the Features from The Twilight Saga: Breaking Dawn – Part 1 film soundtrack, 2011
- "From Now On", by Lala Hsu from The Inner Me, 2017
- "From Now On", by Supertramp from Even in the Quietest Moments..., 1977
- "From Now On", from the film The Greatest Showman, 2017
- "From Now On", written by Cole Porter for the musical Leave It to Me!, 1938
- From Now On, a song in Deltarune Chapter 4

== Other ==
- From Now On (film), a 2007 Portuguese film directed by Catarina Ruivo
- From Now On (1920 film), an American film of 1920
- Bắt đầu từ nay, meaning "From Now On", a meme in Hong Kong.
