= Colour My World (Petula Clark song) =

Single by Petula Clark

from the album Colour My World (UK) Color My World/Who Am I (U.S.)
- B-side: "I'm Begging You (Take Me Home Again)" (non-LP track)
- Released: December 1966
- Recorded: 1966
- Genre: Pop, vocal
- Length: 2:51
- Label: Pye 7N 17218 (UK); Warner Bros. 5882 (US); Vogue DV 14609 (GER); Vogue STU 44460 (DEN); Vogue VN 1004 (NOR)
- Songwriters: Tony Hatch, Jackie Trent
- Producer: Tony Hatch

Petula Clark singles chronology
"Who Am I?" (1966)	"Colour My World" (1966)	"This Is My Song" (1967)

"Colour My World" (Color My World on U.S. Release) is a song written by Tony Hatch and Jackie Trent, and recorded by Petula Clark in 1966.

== Background ==
While overall conforming to the hit formula Hatch had come up with for Clark with "Downtown" – and being especially reminiscent of Clark's 1966 #1 hit "My Love – "Colour My World" acknowledged the sound of the later 1960s by featuring a riff played on the sitar.

Recorded in New York City, "Colour My World" was rush released in December 1966 in an attempt to counteract the disappointing performance of Clark's preceding single "Who Am I?" which had fallen short of the US Top 20 and more seriously had become the first Petula Clark single since "Downtown" (1964) to not rank in the UK Top 50.

Billboard magazine's original review of the song predicted it would make the top 20 of the Hot 100. "Chalk up another chart topper in this intriguing Hatch-Trent rhythm number featuring the popular Indian sitar sound and exceptional Clark vocal work."

== Chart performance ==
Although it did return Clark to the top twenty on the US pop charts in early-1967 and was also an Australian top ten hit, "Colour My World" became the second consecutive single by Clark to fall short of the UK Top 50, peaking at number 52.

Chart (1966–1967)	Peak position
Australia	10
Canada	14
New Zealand (Listener)	13
US Billboard Hot 100	16
US Easy Listening (Billboard)	10

== Cover versions ==
- Tony Hatch later produced a recording of "Colour My World" for Two of Each, a group whose lead vocalist Mally Page was the sister of the song's co-writer Jackie Trent to whom Hatch was then married. The Two of Each version of "Colour My World" was issued in January 1970 on a single featuring a version of "Here Comes the Sun" with neither track charting.
- "Colour My World" was recorded by Jason Kouchak at the 2019 Brighton Festival.
- "Color My World", was a #38 C&W hit for Barbara Fairchild in 1972.
- The cover by Volcano Suns was a bonus track on the CD of their 1987 album Bumper Crop.
- It was also rendered as an inspirational number by Sierra who included the song - as "Color My World" - on their 1998 Story of Life album.
- "Colour My World" has been rendered in Croatian by Višnja Korbar as "Svijet za nas" (The world for us) and also by Anica Zubović (hr) as "Moja Jedina Ljubav" (My only love).
- In French by Renée Martel (fr) as "Viens Changer Ma Vie" (Just change my life).
- In Italian as "Dipingi un mondo per me" (Paint a world for me) by Milva
- In Spanish as "Pinta mi mundo" (Paint my world) by both Mexican singer Angélica María and Spanish singer Gelu (es).

== Popular culture ==
- "Colour My World" gained a high UK profile by virtue of being used by BBC Television as the theme song for the November 1969 launch of colour service on BBC1.
- An instrumental rendition was later used for Seven Network in Australia for the launch of colour television services in the summer of 1975.
- In 2004 "Colour My World" — referred to as "Color My World" — was utilized as a jingle in US television commercials for M&M's being rendered in various versions including as a languid ballad; the vocal on the last named version was by Reneé Cologne.
- UK furniture retailer DFS used the Petula Clark version in a UK television commercial campaign run in 2008.
- "Colour My World" is featured in the stage musical Priscilla Queen of the Desert which debuted 6 October 2006. It features the ensemble cast dressed as dancing paintbrushes. The song appears on the 2007 cast recording performed by Daniel Scott, Tony Sheldon, Jeremy Stanford and the Company.
- "Colour My World" was used as the title for a BBC Radio 2 documentary on Tony Hatch broadcast in June 2009.
- Petula Clark's recording of "Colour My World" features in the stage play Our Lady of Blundellsands by Jonathan Harvey which premiered at Liverpool Everyman Theatre in March 2020 and was revived in September 2021. The character of Mickey Joe lip-syncs to it in a drag routine.
- "Colour My World" is the name given to Bayonetta's new set of handguns in Bayonetta 3. The individual weapons are named "Green Grass", "Blue Sky", "Yellow Sunshine" and "Orange Blossom", referencing the song's lyrics.
