= You're the One (Petula Clark song) =

1965 song by Petula Clark

Single by Petula Clark

from the album I Know a Place
- B-side: "Gotta Tell the World"
- Released: 1965
- Recorded: 1965
- Genre: Pop, traditional pop
- Length: 2:26
- Label: Pye UK 7N 15991; Vogue Norway V1312
- Songwriters: Petula Clark, Tony Hatch
- Producer: Tony Hatch

Petula Clark singles chronology
"Round Every Corner" (1965)	"You're the One" (1965)	"My Love" (1965)

"You're the One"

Single by The Vogues

from the album Meet The Vogues
- B-side: "Some Words"
- Released: September 1965
- Recorded: 1965
- Genre: Pop rock
- Length: 2:17
- Label: Co&Ce
- Songwriters: Petula Clark, Tony Hatch

The Vogues singles chronology
"You're the One" (1965)	"Five O'Clock World" (1966)

"You're the One" is a song by Petula Clark with lyrics by Tony Hatch, recorded in 1965. It was later also included on the 1965 album I Know a Place. "You're the One" was a Top 30 hit on the UK Singles Chart for Clark, but was more successful as a top ten US single release by The Vogues.

== History ==
Petula Clark thus describes the genesis of "You're the One": "we [Clark and Tony Hatch] were making yet another LP, and that's like twelve [or] thirteen songs. He'd written twelve, and he said, 'Listen, I haven't got a number thirteen in me at all. Write something.' And I said, 'Okay. I'll try.' And I wrote the melody of 'You're the One.' And he wrote the lyric." As was standard with Clark's tracks produced by Hatch, "You're the One" was recorded at Pye Studios in Marble Arch. Hatch also conducted for the session whose personnel featured Bobby Graham on drums, Big Jim Sullivan on guitar and The Breakaways vocal group.

Originally there were no plans to issue a follow-up to the "I Know a Place" single off its parent album; instead two newly recorded Petula Clark singles were consecutively released: "You'd Better Come Home" and "Round Every Corner" both of which barely made the UK Top 50. Both singles were substantially more successful in the US where each neared the Top 20 in respectively the summer and autumn of 1965. However the US chart impact of Clark's own singles in the latter half of 1965 paled next to that of a recording of Clark's composition "You're the One" by the Vogues which reached No. 4 in the US and Canada that autumn.

Recorded at Gateway Studios in Pittsburgh, "You're the One" was the first track to be credited to the Vogues although the group had previously recorded as the Val-Aires. Pittsburgh-based record producer Nick Cenci had already cut "You're the One" with a local band called the Racket Squad; after hearing the Val-Aires audition tape, Cenci decided that that group's lead singer Bill Burkette could sing "You're the One" more effectively than Racket Squad vocalist Sonny DiNunzio. Accordingly, DiNunzio's vocals were erased from the master, so that Burkette could record a fresh vocal over the instrumentation played by the Racket Squad's members.

Cenci approached Jim Rook, program director of KQV, with the Vogues' "You're the One" and KQV became the first radio station to play the record, which entered the KQV "Finest Forty" chart in July 1965, and that August broke in Detroit and San Diego. prior to breaking nationally that September.

The burgeoning success of the Vogues' "You're the One" had alerted Petula Clark's UK label, Pye Records, to the track's hit potential with Pye rush releasing Clark's own version as a single which entered the UK chart in November 1965 and peaked at No. 23. According to Chuck Blasco of the Vogues, Clark's US label, Warner Bros., had also intended to issue Clark's version as a single to vie with the Vogues' version in the US, but Clark vetoed the idea saying: "Let the boys have the hit". The Vogues' version did have a UK release on London Records but did not garner enough interest to share the UK charts with Clark's version.

In the autumn of 1965 four versions of "You're the One" charted in Australia with that by Petula Clark becoming the major hit at No. 4. Besides the Vogues version, which reached No. 55, two local covers of "You're the One" charted with that by Col Joye reaching No. 41 while that by Yvonne Barrett—charting in tandem with its B-side "Little People"—reached No. 58.

A No. 30 hit for Petula Clark in the Netherlands, "You're the One" also afforded the Vogues a top ten hit in Canada (No. 4) and New Zealand.

Unique among Clark's hit singles as the only English language hit in which she had a hand in writing, "You're the One" was rendered by Clark in French, German and Italian; the French version was entitled "Un Mal Pour Un Bien" (French No. 6), the German "Deine Liebe ist wunderbar".

Clark performed the song live in the 1965 concert film The Big T.N.T. Show.

The 1967 album release Pet Project by the Bob Florence Big Band features an instrumental version of "You're the One", the album being devoted to songs associated with Petula Clark.

Rocky Sharpe and the Replays remade "You're the One" for a 1981 single (Chiswick Records).

A Finnish rendering of "You're the One", "Sinä Vain", was a 1966 single release for Eero.

== Chart history ==
Petula Clark

Chart (1965)	Peak position
Australia	4
France	6
Netherlands	30
UK Singles (OCC)	23

The Vogues

Chart (1965)	Peak position
Australia	55
Canada RPM Top Singles	4
New Zealand	4
US Billboard Hot 100	4
US Cash Box Top 100	7

Col Joye

Chart (1965)	Peak position
Australia	41

Yvonne Barrett

Chart (1965)	Peak position
Australia	58

== In media ==
The Vogues' cover was featured in the Netflix limited series The Queen's Gambit (episode "Doubled Pawns").
