= The World's Greatest International Hits =

Studio album by Petula Clark
- Released: 1965
- Recorded: London
- Genre: Pop
- Label: Pye NPL 18123; Warner Bros. W 1608 Mono; WS 1608 Stereo
- Producer: Tony Hatch

Petula Clark chronology
I Know a Place (1965)	The World's Greatest International Hits (1965)	My Love (1966)

The World's Greatest International Hits is the third album released by Petula Clark in the United States and was the first not to include original material by Tony Hatch. It includes cover songs of other British Invasion groups such as The Beatles and The Honeycombs. Roland Bianchini was credited with the cover photography and Ed Thrasher with art direction.

== Chart performance ==
The album debuted on the Billboard magazine's Top LP’s chart in the issue of October 23, 1965, the album attained a No. 129 peak during a nine-week run.

== Track listing ==
Side one

1. "Never on Sunday" (Manos Hadjidakis, Billy Towne)
2. "You Can't Keep Me from Loving You" (Kenny Ball, Oscar Brand, Paul Nassau)
3. "What Now My Love?" (Pierre Delanoë, Carl Sigman)
4. "Why Don't They Understand" (Jack Fishman, Joe "Mr Piano" Henderson)
5. "Have I the Right?" (Ken Howard, Alan Blaikley)
6. "Volare" (Domenico Modugno, Franco Migliacci)

Side two

1. "Morgen (One More Sunrise)" (Noel Sherman, Peter Moesser)
2. "I Want to Hold Your Hand" (John Lennon, Paul McCartney)
3. "Love Me with All Your Heart" (Maurice Vaughn, Sunny Skylar)
4. "The Boy from Ipanema" (Vinícius de Moraes, Norman Gimbel)
5. "I (Who Have Nothing)" (Carlo Donida, Mogol, Jerry Leiber, Mike Stoller)
6. "Hello, Dolly" (Jerry Herman)

== Personnel ==
Technical

- Tony Hatch - arrangements, conductor
- Ed Thrasher - art direction
- Roland Bianchini - cover photography
