= Josh MacRae =

Scottish singer (1933–1977)

McRae in 1966

Josh MacRae (17 July 1933 – 1977) was a Scottish folk singer. His actual name was Iain Macrae, but he called himself Josh after the blues musician Josh White.

He completed his National Service in the Army and during that time recorded "The Talking Army Blues". Whilst in the army he met Tony Hatch who wrote "Messing About on the River" (under the pseudonym Mark Anthony), which MacRae later recorded.

He was signed to Pye Records in 1960, and three of his singles reached a peak of no. 15 on the Record Mirror chart; "Talking Army Blues" in July 1960, "Wild Side of Life" in December 1960 and "Messing About on the River" in February 1961.

MacRae committed suicide in 1977.

== Discography ==
=== Albums ===
- Messing About on the River (1965), Pye Golden Guinea GGL 0355
