= I Know a Place (Petula Clark album) =

- 1994 CD release replicating the cover of the original 1965 US LP; Photograph by Sherman Weisburd

Studio album by Petula Clark
- Released: 1965
- Studio: Pye Studios (Great Cumberland Place, London)
- Genre: Pop
- Label: Pye UK NPL 18118 Mono; Vogue Canada VF-47020; Warner Bros. U.S. W 1598 Mono; U.S. WS 1598 Stereo
- Producer: Tony Hatch

Petula Clark chronology
Downtown (1965)	I Know a Place (1965)	The World's Greatest International Hits (1965)

Singles from I Know a Place
- 1. "I Know a Place" Released: March 1965; 2. "You're the One" Released: 1965

Professional ratings
Review scores
Source	Rating
Allmusic	4/5 stars

I Know a Place is the second album release by Petula Clark, which in the USA (her second on Warner Bros.) peaked at No. 42. In the UK, the album was released as The New Petula Clark Album, a name which was dropped during later re-releases to prevent confusion among record-buyers.

Arranged and produced by Tony Hatch, the album followed on the release of Clark's "I Know a Place" hit single and yielded another UK hit with "You're the One". The latter song was a Top Ten hit in the US for the Vogues and another song introduced by Clark on this album: "Call Me", reached the US Top 30 via a recording by Chris Montez.

Another album cut: "Strangers and Lovers", is noteworthy as the song Helen Reddy chose to compete with in the televised talent show she won in 1965, her victory marking her move from Australia to the US.

"The 'In' Crowd" was originally recorded in October 1964 by Dobie Gray, whose version charted in the top-twenty in the U.S. and top-thirty in the U.K. in 1965.

== Track listing ==
Side one

1. "Dancing in the Street" (William "Mickey" Stevenson, Marvin Gaye)
2. "Strangers and Lovers" (Tony Hatch)
3. "Everything in the Garden" (Roger Greenaway)
4. "The "In" Crowd" (Billy Page)
5. "Heart" (Petula Clark, Georges Aber, Tony Hatch)
6. "You're the One" (Tony Hatch, Petula Clark)

Side two

1. "A Foggy Day" (George Gershwin, Ira Gershwin)
2. "Gotta Tell The World" (Pierre Delanoë, Petula Clark, Tony Hatch)
3. "Every Little Bit Hurts" (Ed Cobb)
4. "Call Me" (Tony Hatch)
5. "Goin' Out of My Head" (Teddy Randazzo, Bobby Weinstein)
6. "I Know a Place" (Tony Hatch)

== CD release ==
The album was released on compact disc by Sequel Records in 1994. It includes four bonus tracks:

- "You'd Better Come Home"
- "Round Every Corner"
  (The above two tracks were Clark's third and fourth U.S. singles, respectively, that did not appear on LP until Petula Clark's Greatest Hits Volume 1 in 1968)
- "Jack and John" (Non-LP B-side of "I Know a Place")
- "The Sound of Love" (Previously unreleased)

== Personnel ==
Technical

- Tony Hatch - producer, arrangements
- Ed Thrasher - art direction
- Sherman Weisburd - photography
