= Julie Grant =

English pop music singer (born 1946)

- Born: Vivien Foreman; 12 July 1946 (age 80); Blackpool, Lancashire, England
- Genre: Pop music
- Occupation: Singer
- Years active: 1960s
- Label: Pye Records

Julie Grant (born 12 July 1946) is an English pop music singer, who was mainly active during the 1960s. She had three hits on the UK Singles Chart with "Up on the Roof", "Count on Me" (both 1963) and "Come to Me" (1964). She also recorded a cover version of "Every Day I Have to Cry" (1964).

Grant was a contemporary of Petula Clark and Cilla Black. Allmusic journalist Richie Unterberger noted "she had a strong, versatile voice" but was hindered by "her inability to carve out a recognizable stylistic niche".

== Early life ==
Julie Grant was born Vivien Foreman in Blackpool, Lancashire, England. When Grant was aged 16 months old her family – besides her parents, she had an older brother and sister – relocated to Cape Town where, at the age of four, she won a local talent contest. Her prize was the opportunity to perform a concert with a local orchestra, who invited Grant to sing with them regularly for a couple of years. Grant subsequently lived with her family for brief periods in Johannesburg and Victoria Falls, then returned with them to England. They first lived in London where Grant attended the Italia Conti Academy and, at age nine, she appeared onstage at the Drury Lane Theatre in The King and I. Grant then moved with her family to Leeds, where she trained in dance and opera, singing with a local orchestra on weekends.

== Recording career ==
At age 15 Grant was discovered by Frankie Vaughan and signed by Vaughan's agent Eric Easton who arranged for Grant to audition for Pye Records. Pye signed Grant who was still known as Vivien Foreman: as the label requested she adopt a stage name Grant formed "Julie Grant" from the name of her father's accountant Julian Grant. The debut single by Julie Grant, "Somebody Tell Him", was released in March 1962 and was the first of fifteen singles all produced by Tony Hatch the fourth of which, a cover of The Drifters' US hit, "Up on the Roof", gave Grant her chart debut. Despite being beaten by a rival UK cover by Kenny Lynch, which reached No. 5 compared to the No. 33 peak of Grant's version, Grant was able to use the relative success of "Up on the Roof" to gain a series of television guest spots, plus star billing on a package tour which also featured The Rolling Stones, The Everly Brothers and Bo Diddley. Grant's profile was maintained by her follow-up single, the March 1963 release "Count on Me", which became her best chart placing in the UK at No. 24.

After five intervening single releases Grant was afforded a third and final UK chart hit with the August 1964 release "Come to Me", an orchestral ballad (as opposed to Grant's earlier Merseybeat-style hits) which reached No. 31. Grant had no further single releases until January 1965. It has been alleged that Grant turned down the opportunity to record the Tony Hatch composition, "Downtown", recorded by Petula Clark on 16 October 1964 to become an international hit. However, Hatch has said that he only completed the lyrics of "Downtown" after Clark had heard the melody and asked to record it, and also said that prior to Clark's involvement he had thought to place the song with the Drifters: "it never occurred to me [originally] that a white woman could even sing it." From January 1965 Pye issued four singles by Grant with the fourth: "Stop" released 17 September 1965, bringing Grant's Pye Records tenure to a close. Tony Hatch would later recall: "I thought Julie Grant was great and I'm sorry I never managed to help her achieve her full potential. No doubt I was producing too many artistes at this time, especially girls. In those years, in-house producers often faced this problem and I could never give her the attention she deserved".

== Later career and life ==
In 1967, Grant's manager suggested that she join the Zaras, a Spanish-based lounge act who, prior to Grant's recruitment, comprised the Zaratiegui family: four brothers and two sisters from Tafalla. Grant first toured Europe with the Zaras under the aegis of the USO: in 1969 the Zaras accepted an offer for a three-month engagement in the United States where subsequent engagements resulted in the group's members including Grant making Las Vegas their home base from 1970, which year Grant married Marino Zaratiegui of the Zaras with whom she has a daughter. Until 1975 Grant performed as female lead for the Zaras throughout the Caribbean, Canada, and the US, playing casinos, resorts and cruise ships.

From 1975 Grant performed as a solo act at the behest of David Connelly the road manager for the Carpenters whom Grant had met while performing in Toronto with the Zaras: Grant and Connelly formed a personal relationship – eventually marrying – and also a professional one as Connelly became Grant's manager. A 1988 article which described Grant as "performing on the Las Vegas/Atlantic City resort circuit since the late 1970s" quoted her as saying: "Until last year, I was on the road fifty weeks a year. But I was to the point where I said: 'It's time for myself and my family'" (Grant was also described as "the mother of three teen-agers"). In 1994, Grant retired from performing to work as a booking agent and she, and her husband, are still running their own talent agency.

Grant, who was featured on recordings by the Zaras, also recorded in 1985 for Estate Records, a label headed by Paul Leka. In 2010, Grant self-released a live album that had been recorded at the Hilton Hotel in Springfield, Virginia, in 1978.

She currently lives in Gilford, New Hampshire.

== Discography ==
=== Chart singles ===
Year	Title Songwriters	UK Singles Chart
1962	"Up on the Roof" (Gerry Goffin / Carole King)	Number 33
1963	"Count on Me" (Tony Hatch)	Number 24
1964	"Come to Me" (John Beveridge / Charles Pryor)	Number 31

=== Compilation albums ===
Year	Title	Note
1994	Count on Me (RPM Records)	Come to Me has the same track listing and order as Count on Me
2004	Come to Me: The Pye Anthology (Castle Music)	Come to Me has the same track listing and order as Count on Me
