= Downtown (Petula Clark album) =

- US cover, Warner Bros.

Studio album by Petula Clark
- Released: 1965
- Recorded: 1963–1965
- Studios: Pye Studies, Marble Arch, London
- Genre: Pop
- Length: 30:20
- Labels: Pye (UK); Warner Bros. (U.S.); Disques Vogue (France, Canada)
- Producer: Tony Hatch

Petula Clark chronology
In Other Words (1962)	Downtown (1965)	I Know a Place (1965)

Singles from Downtown
- 1. "In Love" Released: 1964; 2. "True Love Never Runs Smooth" Released: 1964; 3. "Downtown" Released: November 1964

Professional ratings
Review scores
Source	Rating
Allmusic	4/5 stars

Downtown is an album by Petula Clark (her first album licensed to Warner Bros. Records) following the success of her single of the same title. The album's tracks were all produced, arranged and conducted by Tony Hatch and were recorded at the Pye Studios in Marble Arch with the session personnel including drummer Bobby Graham, guitarist Big Jim Sullivan and the Breakaways vocal group; the "Downtown" track included guitarists Vic Flick and Jimmy Page in addition to Sullivan. Most of the album's tracks pre-dated the title cut, with almost all of the sides Hatch had produced from their inaugural collaboration: the 1963 single "Let Me Tell You Baby", being included.

Downtown entered the Billboard 200 on 13 February 1965 for a 36 weeks chart run with a #21 peak. Despite Clark's subsequent album releases being more focused on the hit sound Hatch had devised for Clark with the "Downtown" single, the Downtown album would remain Clark's most successful US album release. Downtown did not rank in the UK album charts which were then limited to the Top Twenty.

== Track listing ==
Side one
No.	Title	Writer(s)	Length
1.	"True Love Never Runs Smooth"	Hal David (lyrics) Burt Bacharach (music)	2:07
2.	"Baby It's Me"	Mark Anthony (pseudonym for Tony Hatch)	2:19
3.	"Now That You've Gone"	Petula Clark, Hubert Ballay, Norman Newell	2:54
4.	"Tell Me (That It's Love)"	Tony Hatch, Petula Clark, Ralph Bernet	2:31
5.	"Crying Through a Sleepless Night"	Mark Anthony (pseudonym for Tony Hatch)	2:23
6.	"In Love"	Harvey Fuqua, Bobby Lester	2:31

Side two
No.	Title	Writer(s)	Length
1.	"Music"	Tony Hatch	3:09
2.	"Be Good To Me"	Petula Clark, Tony Hatch	2:00
3.	"This Is Goodbye"	Georges Aber, Petula Clark, Tony Hatch	2:22
4.	"Let Me Tell You Baby"	Mark Anthony (pseudonym for Tony Hatch)	2:13
5.	"You Belong to Me"	Chilton Price, Pee Wee King, Redd Stewart	2:36
6.	"Downtown"	Tony Hatch	3:01
