= I Couldn't Live Without Your Love (album) =

Studio album by Petula Clark
- Released: September 1966
- Recorded: June 1966
- Studio: Pye Studios (Great Cumberland Place, London)
- Genre: Pop
- Label: Pye (UK); Warner Bros. (U.S.)
- Producer: Tony Hatch

Petula Clark chronology
My Love (1966)	I Couldn't Live Without Your Love (1966)	Colour My World (1967)

Singles from I Couldn't Live Without Your Love
- 1. "I Couldn't Live Without Your Love" Released: May 1966

Professional ratings
Review scores
Source	Rating
Allmusic	3/5 stars

I Couldn't Live Without Your Love is a Petula Clark album released in the United States and the UK in September 1966. Clark's fifth US album release, I Couldn't Live Without Your Love was the first Petula Clark album to include creative personnel besides Tony Hatch, who produced the album and arranged some of the tracks, along with Johnny Harris.

== Overview ==
The album was released subsequent to the Top Ten success in both the UK and the US of the "I Couldn't Live Without Your Love" single. Unlike the parent albums of Clark's precedent hits which had favored original material over cover versions, the I Couldn't Live Without Your Love album featured seven contemporary covers plus the traditional pop standard "Come Rain or Come Shine". This formula proved to be a popularity booster in the UK where I Couldn't Live Without Your Love became Clark's first charting album; its No. 11 peak remains Clark's UK album chart best. In the US the album reached No. 43.

The mid-60s hits Clark covers on the album include "Elusive Butterfly"; its original artist and writer Bob Lind has called Clark's recording his favourite version despite its omission of a verse. Also included is Clark's version of the Mindbenders' "A Groovy Kind of Love"; that track became a hit for Clark in Rhodesia (#7) and South Africa (#5) in the summer of 1967. The set opens with Clark's bouncy rendition of Frank Sinatra's recent #1 hit "Strangers in the Night". Her nasal version of the song was reportedly in retaliation for Sinatra's version of "Downtown". Clark performed the song on "The Hollywood Palace".

The song "Two Rivers" was penned by Clark as autobiographic, with references to the Thames and the Seine Rivers, as well as to her husband.

I Couldn't Live Without Your Love also features "Wasn't It You", which is Clark's only recording of a Gerry Goffin/Carole King song.^{1}

- ^{1}Clark has cut post-1960s compositions written by Gerry Goffin and Carole King independently of each other - respectively "Two Lives" (Gerry Goffin/Tom Kelly/Billy Steinberg) and "Beautiful"; Clark has also recorded a live version of King's "You've Got a Friend".

== Track listing ==
Side one

1. "Strangers in the Night" (Bert Kaempfert, Charles Singleton, Eddie Snyder)
2. "A Groovy Kind of Love" (Carole Bayer Sager, Toni Wine)
3. "Rain" (John Lennon, Paul McCartney)
4. "Wasn't It You" (Gerry Goffin, Carole King)
5. "There Goes My Love, There Goes My Life" (Tony Hatch, Petula Clark, Hubert Ballay, Jackie Trent)
6. "Monday Monday" (John Phillips)

Side two

1. "Bang Bang" (Sonny Bono)
2. "Homeward Bound" (Paul Simon)
3. "Two Rivers" (Petula Clark)
4. "Come Rain or Come Shine" (Johnny Mercer, Harold Arlen)
5. "Elusive Butterfly" (Bob Lind)
6. "I Couldn't Live Without Your Love" (Tony Hatch, Jackie Trent)

== Personnel ==
Technical

- Tony Hatch - arrangements, conductor
- Johnny Harris - arrangements, conductor
- Roy Prickett - recording engineer
- Ed Thrasher - art direction
