= Five O'Clock World (album) =

Studio album by The Vogues
- Released: January 1966
- Genre: Pop, rock
- Label: Co & Ce
- Producer: James Stroud & Dick Glasser

The Vogues chronology
Meet the Vogues (1965)	Five O'Clock World (1966)	Turn Around, Look at Me (1968)

Five O'Clock World is the second album by the Vogues, released by Co & Ce Records in 1966.

== Track listing ==
Track	Title	Songwriter(s)
1	"Five O'Clock World"	Allen Reynolds
2	"Goodnight My Love"	George Motola / John Marascalco
3	"Sunday and Me"	Neil Diamond
4	"Everyone's Gone to the Moon"	Jonathan King
5	"Let's Hang On"	Sandy Linzer, Denny Randell, Bob Crewe
6	"A Thousand Miles Away"	James Sheppard / William H. Miller
7	"One More Sunrise"	Peter Mosser / Noel Sherman
8	"Over and Over Again"	Ben Weisman / Al Weisman
9	"Make the World Go Away"	Hank Cochran
10	"Run Baby Run"	Joe Melson / Don Gant
11	"My Troubles Are Not at End"	Curtis Williams
12	"Humpty Dumpty"	Herbert Cohen / E. Rostelli
