= Colour My World (album) =

Colour My World (UK) Color My World/Who Am I (U.S.)
- US cover (Warner Bros.)

Studio album by Petula Clark
- Released: 1967
- Genre: Pop
- Label: Pye Records (UK); Warner Bros. Records (U.S.)
- Producer: Tony Hatch

Petula Clark chronology
I Couldn't Live Without Your Love (1966)	Colour My World (UK); Color My World/Who Am I (U.S.) (1967)	These Are My Songs (1967)

Singles from Colour My World
- 1. "Who Am I?" Released: October 1966; 2. "Colour My World" Released: December 1966

Professional ratings
Review scores
Source	Rating
Allmusic	2/5 stars

Colour My World is the sixth album released by Petula Clark in the US on Warner Bros. Records. It combines cover versions of popular songs of the era and original material, much of it written by Clark and Tony Hatch, who produced the recording and arranged it along with Johnny Harris and Frank Owens.

== Overview ==
In the UK, where it was released on Pye Records, the original album release was withdrawn after a month to have Clark's current hit "This Is My Song" and its UK B-side: "The Show Is Over", added to the track listing. This revised edition of the album - with the subtitle "Including 'This Is My Song'" - reached #16 on the UK album charts.

In the USA, the album entitled Color My World/Who Am I entered the Billboard Top LP's on February 18, 1967 and remained on the charts for 27 weeks, peaking at #49.

== Track listing ==
Side one

1. "England Swings" (Roger Miller)^{1}
2. "Cherish" (Terry Kirkman)
3. "Please Don't Go" (Tony Hatch, Petula Clark, Hubert Ballay)
4. "What Would I Be" (Jackie Trent)
5. "While the Children Play" (Tony Hatch, Petula Clark, Georges Aber)
6. "Who Am I" (Tony Hatch, Jackie Trent)

Side two

1. "Winchester Cathedral" (Geoff Stephens)
2. "Las Vegas" (Guy Magenta, Tony Hatch, Petula Clark, Pierre Delanoë)
3. "Reach Out, I'll Be There" (Edward Holland, Jr., Lamont Dozier, Brian Holland)^{2}
4. "Special People" (Petula Clark, Frank Owens)
5. "Here, There and Everywhere" (John Lennon, Paul McCartney)
6. "Colour My World" (Tony Hatch, Jackie Trent)
- ^{1}UK edition Colour My World substitutes "This Is My Song" written by Charlie Chaplin
- ^{2}UK edition Colour My World substitutes "The Show Is Over" written by Petula Clark
