= The Breakaways =

English female vocal trio

- Also known as: The Fordettes
- Past members: Vicki Haseman; Margot Quantrell; Eleanor Russell; Betty Prescott; Barbara Moore

The Breakaways were an English female vocal trio, formed in 1962. Britain's premier session vocalists throughout the 1960s, The Breakaways also recorded a handful of little-known girl group singles.

== Career ==
The original members were Vicki Haseman (Vicki Brown after marriage to Joe Brown), Margot Quantrell, Barbara Moore (who was also a member of another vocal trio, The Ladybirds), and Betty Prescott. The girls were originally members of the Liverpool vocal group The Vernons Girls. Prescott was replaced by Jean Ryder in 1963.

They started out as the Fordettes, backing Emile Ford. The line-up consisted of Margot Quantrell, Eleanor Russell, Vicki Haseman and Betty Prescott. They spent a year on tour with Ford in 1960, playing one-nighters. Back in London they left Ford to sing backup for Joe Brown who Vicki Haseman had been engaged to for a year. Having broken away from Ford, they were then known as The Breakaways.

Haseman was later replaced by the original member Betty Prescott. In addition to recording their own songs, they did session work with many artists, including the background vocals on The Jimi Hendrix Experience's version of "Hey Joe", and work on the 1968 album The Cheerful Insanity of Giles, Giles and Fripp.

Having signed with the Pye label, their background vocal activities included collaborations with Petula Clark. Most notably this was on Clark's international hit, "Downtown" (not only the original English version, but also in French, Italian and German). There followed "I Know a Place", "Round Every Corner", and "A Sign of the Times", and on several of Clark's most successful French recordings, among them "Je me sens bien auprès de toi", "Mon bonheur danse" (a vocal version of The Shadows' "Foot Tapper") and "Tu perds ton temps".

They worked with Dusty Springfield on her first solo recordings for Philips, and went on to sing on hundreds of sessions supporting Springfield, Cilla Black, Normie Rowe and Lulu. Their work with Cilla Black included being credited as backing vocalists on Black's 1964 single, "You're My World", and were backing singers on her BBC television series Cilla. They backed Cliff Richard's performance of "Congratulations" in the 1968 Eurovision Song Contest at the Royal Albert Hall in London, which placed second in the competition. In 1971, they returned to Eurovision, backing Clodagh Rodgers in her performance of "Jack in the Box", joined by Clodagh's sister Lavinia. That time the song placed fourth. In 1977, at the Eurovision contest staged at the Wembley Conference Centre, the trio sang backing vocals for the Israeli entry "Ahava Hi Shir Lishnayim" performed by Ilanit. The song was performed in Hebrew and The Breakaways learnt their lyrics phonetically as none of them spoke the language. The song placed 11th of the 18 entries. They toured behind American stars such as Little Richard and Sam Cooke, and regularly appeared on Ready Steady Go!.

The Breakaways first single for Pye Records was "That Boy of Mine" (1964), written by Tony Hatch. Although the single was a minor hit, the follow-ups, including "He Doesn't Love Me" and "That's How It Goes", flopped. Their 1965 work on the Burt Bacharach song "Trains and Boats and Planes" and his 1965 album Hit Maker! was uncredited. They sang the uncredited vocals on "Someone to Talk To" from the 1965 movie, Darling. They continued to do session work. Their last single was the Mike Leander song "Sacred Love" (1968).

Vicki Brown died of breast cancer on 16 June 1991, in Henley-on-Thames at the age of 50.

Margot Quantrell died on 24 June 2016 at the age of 74.

Betty Prescott died on 10 May 2023 at the age of 86, her funeral was at the West Herts Crematorium on 5 June 2023.
