= My Love (Petula Clark song) =

Single by Petula Clark

from the album My Love
- B-side: "Where Am I Going?"
- Released: December 1965
- Recorded: 1965
- Studio: Western Studios, Los Angeles
- Genre: Pop
- Length: 2:43
- Label: Pye 7N 17038 (UK); Warner Bros. 5684 (US); Vogue STU 42234 (DEN)
- Songwriter: Tony Hatch
- Producer: Tony Hatch

Petula Clark singles chronology
"Round Every Corner" (1965)	"My Love" (1965)	"A Sign of the Times" (1966)

"My Love" is a 1965 single release by Petula Clark which, in early 1966, became an international hit, reaching No. 1 in the US; the track continued Clark's collaboration with songwriter and record producer Tony Hatch.

== History ==
In November 1965, on a flight from London to Los Angeles, Tony Hatch was putting the finishing touches on his composition "The Life and Soul of the Party", which he planned to record with Clark in Los Angeles to serve as her next single. During casual conversation with the American sitting next to him, Hatch was advised that this song's title would be meaningless to the American public. Hatch then wrote lyrics for a song whose title – "My Love" – could not conceivably present any comprehension issue; the lyrics were completed during the flight and Hatch completed the music soon after landing in Los Angeles.

"My Love" was recorded at Western Studios and featured the backing of the Wrecking Crew. Petula Clark would recall: "We recorded three songs on that session...I liked the two other songs quite a lot, but I really didn't like 'My Love'...I thought it was a bit ordinary. I had got so used to these wonderful songs that Tony had been writing with all these different moods and I thought 'My Love' was just a bit flat." Clark would describe how she tried to discourage Warner Bros A&R man Joe Smith from issuing "My Love" as a single: "He's a very small man physically...about the right height for me. I was able to get hold of his lapels, and I said to him, 'Joe, I don't care which [of the three songs] you put out, but just don't put out "My Love".' And he said: 'Trust me, baby.'"

== Reception ==
Smith did in fact agree to the release of "My Love" as a single, and it returned Clark to the top of the US charts for the first time since "Downtown", her breakthrough success. "My Love" spent 13 weeks on the Billboard Hot 100, reaching No. 1 on 5 February 1966, and spending two weeks at that position. This made Clark the first British female to have two US No. 1 hits. Also a No. 1 hit on Canada's "RPM Play Sheet", "My Love" returned Clark to the top ten on the UK's Record Retailer chart for the first time since "Downtown" two years previous, with a March 1966 peak of No. 4.

=== Chart performance ===
Chart (1966)	Peak position
Australia	4
Canada (RPM Play Sheet)	1
Denmark	≥9
Flanders	14
Germany	13
Ireland (IRMA)	6
Malaysia	4
Netherlands (Parool Top 20)	11
Netherlands (Veronica Top 40)	13
New Zealand (Listener)	6
Singapore	1
South Africa	6
Switzerland	≥8
UK New Musical Express	4
UK Record Retailer	4
US Billboard Hot 100	1
US Billboard Easy Listening	4
US Record World 100 Top Pops	1
Wallonia	35

== Adaptations into other languages ==
Translated recordings by Clark also made "My Love" a hit in France, Italy, and West Germany, respectively as "Mon amour" (No. 12), "L'amore è il vento" (Love is the wind) (No. 24), and "Verzeih' die dummen Tränen" (Forgive the foolish tears) (No. 21). "Mon amour" also reached No. 35 in Wallonia, in a tandem ranking with "My Love" and "Si tu prenais le temps".

== Cover versions ==
- Also in the 1960s, Ed Kilbourne wrote gospel-themed lyrics to the song, retitling it "His love".
- The Norwegian rendering "Det er så lett å leve livet" was recorded in 1966 by Vigdis Mostad, also the Swedish rendering "Det är så lätt att leva livet" by Gitte Haenning and the Finnish rendering "Rakkauteni" by Hannele Laaksonen. "Rakkauteni" was also recorded by Laila Kinnunen whose version appears on the 2002 compilation Kadonneet Helmet.
- Mrs. Miller covered the song in 1966, on her debut album with Capitol Records entitled Mrs. Miller's Greatest Hits and is on the 1997 compilation CD of her work released on Capitol's Ultra-Lounge label: Wild, Cool & Swingin', The Artist Collection Vol. 3: Mrs. Miller.
- John Davidson covered it in 1966 for his album Time of My Life!.
- The 1967 album release Pet Project by the Bob Florence Big Band features an instrumental version of "My Love", the album being devoted to songs associated with Petula Clark.
- Sonny James (C&W singer) covered "My Love" in 1970. His version reached No. 1 that May on the Billboard Hot Country Singles chart, in the midst of his then-record string of 16-straight No. 1 singles in as many releases. Also in 1970 C&W singer Barbara Fairchild recorded "My Love" for her debut album Someone Special.
- Nancy Boyd (nl) remade "My Love" for her 1987 album of classic hit songs Let's Hang On credited to Nancy Boyd & Cappello's.
- Florence Henderson (Actress/singer) performed the song as a serenade on the famous 1969 "Tonight Show" segment in which Tiny Tim married Miss Vicky.
