= I Know a Place =

Single by Petula Clark

from the album I Know a Place
- B-side: "Jack and John"
- Released: March 1965
- Genre: Pop
- Length: 2:39
- Label: Pye (UK); Warner Bros. (US)
- Songwriter: Tony Hatch
- Producer: Tony Hatch

Petula Clark singles chronology
"Downtown" (1964)	"I Know a Place" (1965)	"You'd Better Come Home" (1965)

"I Know a Place" is a song with music and lyrics by Tony Hatch. It was recorded in 1965 by Petula Clark at the Pye Studios in Marble Arch in a session which featured drummer Bobby Graham and the Breakaways vocal group. The American recording industry honored her with a Grammy Award for "Best Contemporary (R&R) Vocal Performance of 1965 – Female" for the song.

== Background ==
Released as the follow-up to "Downtown", which it strongly resembles both in musical structure and the story conveyed by the lyrics.

Billboard described "I Know a Place" as "another winning performance" from Clark and also praised Tony Hatch's production.

Talking about "I Know a Place", Clark told The Boston Globe in 1966 that "No matter what anyone tells you, to make it in the United States is still the dream of every transatlantic performer. You work for it. Long for it. And I can't tell you how ecstatic I was when 'I Know a Place' was nearly as big a hit as 'Downtown' and the Copacabana Club in New York signed me."

Having much more of a rock and roll beat than its predecessor, "I Know a Place" emulated the theme of "Downtown" by inviting the listener to "just get away where your worries won't find you" to a place "where the music is fine and the lights are always low."

The song twice includes the lyric "a cellar full of noise", a deliberate reference to A Cellarful of Noise, the title of Brian Epstein's 1964 autobiography, describing the below-ground Cavern Club in Liverpool where he first discovered the Beatles.

== Chart performance ==
"I Know a Place" was Clark's second consecutive Top Ten hit in the United States, remaining on the charts for twelve weeks, and five of the twelve weeks on the US charts were spent in the Top Ten, the song's fourth week at No. 9, the fifth & sixth week at No. 4, the seventh week at its peak No. 3, then slipping in its eighth week to No. 6, the ninth week ending its turn in the Top Ten at No. 11.

Its UK success was more moderate with a No. 17 peak, establishing the mid-60s pattern of Clark generally having more hit impact in the US than in her homeland.

The recording reached No. 1 in Canada and South Africa, No. 3 in Rhodesia, No. 7 in Australia, and No. 10 in India.

"Viens Avec Moi," Clark's French recording of the song, charted in France and Belgium.
