= I Couldn't Live Without Your Love =

Single by Petula Clark

from the album I Couldn't Live Without Your Love
- B-side: "Your Way of Life" (non-LP track)
- Released: 24 June 1966
- Recorded: June 1966
- Genre: Pop
- Length: 2:54
- Label: Pye 7N 17133 (UK); Warner Bros. 5835 (US); Vogue STU 42245 (DEN); Vogue DVS 14552 (GER)
- Songwriters: Tony Hatch, Jackie Trent
- Producer: Tony Hatch

Petula Clark singles chronology
"A Sign of the Times" (1966)	"I Couldn't Live Without Your Love" (1966)	"Who Am I?" (1966)

"I Couldn't Live Without Your Love" is a 1966 single written by Tony Hatch and Jackie Trent and recorded by Petula Clark. It was inspired by the affair the songwriters were having at the time. Clark has cited "I Couldn't Live Without Your Love" along with "Don't Sleep in the Subway" as her favourite of her hits. “I still love that one; I do it onstage with great joy,” Clark told the "Montreal Gazette" in 2017.

== Background ==
The song was recorded at the Pye Studios in Marble Arch in a session which featured guitarist Big Jim Sullivan, along with vocal group the Breakaways, and was introduced by Clark on her BBC variety series, This Is Petula Clark.

The single peaked at #6 on the UK Singles Chart and #9 on the Billboard Hot 100 chart. "I Couldn't Live Without Your Love" was the first single by Clark to reach #1 on the US Easy Listening chart.

A hit in Australia (#11), New Zealand (#18) and Rhodesia (#7), "I Couldn't Live Without Your Love" gave Clark a hit in Germany twice, first in the original English at #13 and then again via a translation entitled "So wunderbar verliebt zu sein" (So wonderful to be in love) (#28).

== Charts - Petula Clark version ==
Chart (1966)	Peak position
Australian Singles Chart	11
German Singles Chart	13
German Singles Chart: German version ("So wunderbar, verliebt zu sein")	28
New Zealand Singles Chart	18
UK Singles Chart	6
US Billboard Hot 100	9
US Billboard Easy Listening	1

== Other versions ==
"I Couldn't Live Without Your Love" has also been recorded by Patti Brooks, John Davidson, Freda Payne, and Mari Wilson. The 1967 album release Pet Project by the Bob Florence Big Band features an instrumental version of "I Couldn't Live Without Your Love", the album being devoted to songs associated with Petula Clark. The Four King Cousins, a subgroup of the King Family Singers, featuring actress Tina Cole of "My Three Sons," performed the song on their 1969 ABC variety show. They still perform the tune decades later.

In 1966 Donatella Moretti (it) had a single release: "Se un ragazzo pensa a te" which is an Italian rendering of "I Couldn't Live Without Your Love" while Swedish and Finnish renderings were single releases for respectively Siw Malmkvist ("Jag kunde aldrig glömma dej") and Monica Aspelund ("En Ilman Häntä Olla"); another Finnish rendering: "En Voi Elää Ilman Sua", was a 1992 single release for Mari Vesala (fi). The French rendering ""J'aimerais vieillir avec toi" was recorded by Dave for his 2004 album Doux Tam-Tam. The song was also recorded in 1976 by Jugular Vein, a UK jug band, on their album 'Waterloo Road' released on the Plastic Fantastic label, PFLR 3001.

== In media ==
- The song was used in adverts for Cesar dog food in the late 2000s.
- In 2017, the song was used in an advert for Heathrow Airport, following the tale of 2 bears who met on a flight and how their relationship blossomed over the years.
- A version by Lydia Oliver was used at length in a 2024 UK TV advert for pet charity Blue Cross

== See also ==
- List of number-one adult contemporary singles of 1966 (U.S.)

== Bibliography ==
- The Billboard Book of Top 40 Hits, 6th Edition, 1996, Billboard Books, ISBN 978-0823076321
