= Round Every Corner =

Single by Petula Clark
- B-side: "Two Rivers (originally a non-LP track, later released on I Couldn't Live Without Your Love)"
- Released: July 1965
- Recorded: 1965
- Genre: British Invasion, Pop, Vocal
- Length: 2:36
- Label: Warner Bros. WB 5661 (US); Pye 7N 15945 (UK); Vogue DV 14415 (GER); Vogue STU 4513 (DEN)
- Songwriter: Tony Hatch
- Producer: Tony Hatch

Petula Clark singles chronology
"You'd Better Come Home" (1965)	"Round Every Corner" (1965)	"You're The One" (1965)

"Round Every Corner", with words and music by Tony Hatch, is a single release by Petula Clark released in 1965. Described by Clark herself as "an anti-protest song", "Round Every Corner" employs the musical structure of a children's singing game to present its message of optimism. It reached No. 21 on Billboard Hot 100 in the US.

== Background ==
The song was produced by Tony Hatch. It was recorded in July 1965 at the Pye Studios in Marble Arch. The personnel on the recording session included guitarist Big Jim Sullivan.

The previous Petula Clark single "You'd Better Come Home" had evinced a sharp decline in the chart fortunes established by her breakout hit "Downtown". "Round Every Corner" would virtually duplicate the precedent single's chart placings in both the US, where "You'd Better Come Home" and "Round Every Corner" respectively peaked at No. 22 and No. 21, and in the UK. The UK fall-off was more severe - the respective peaks being No. 44 and No. 43.

The 1967 album release Pet Project by the Bob Florence Big Band features an instrumental version of "Round Every Corner", the album being devoted to songs associated with Petula Clark.

== Other versions ==
Clark recorded different versions of "Round Every Corner" in other languages. She recorded the song in French: "Va Toujours Plus Loin" ("Always go farther"), and in Italian: "Gocce di mare" ("Drops in the ocean"). Although Clark had been recording successfully in German regularly since 1962, no German version of "Round Every Corner" was recorded by herself. Instead, Israeli singer and actress Carmela Corren recorded the song in German as "Heut' oder morgen" ("Today Or Tomorrow").

== Charts ==
Chart (1965)	Peak position
Canada Top Singles (RPM)	6
UK Singles (Official Charts)	43
US Billboard Hot 100	21
