= Jackie Trent =

English singer-songwriter and actress (1940–2015)

Background information
- Also known as: Yvonne Ann Gregory
- Born: Yvonne Ann Burgess; 6 September 1940; Newcastle-under-Lyme, Staffordshire, England
- Died: 21 March 2015 (aged 74) Menorca, Spain
- Genres: Popular music, theatre
- Occupations: Singer, songwriter, actress
- Instrument: Vocals
- Years active: 1962–2015
- Labels: Pye, Piccadilly, Oriole, Columbia

Yvonne Ann Gregory (born Yvonne Ann Burgess; 6 September 1940 – 21 March 2015), known professionally as Jackie Trent, was an English singer-songwriter and actress. Her 1965 song "Where Are You Now" reached number one in the UK singles chart. She co-wrote (with Tony Hatch) several hits for Petula Clark in the 1960s and the theme tune to the Australian soap opera Neighbours in 1985.

== Career ==
=== Early years ===
Trent was born in Newcastle-under-Lyme, the daughter of coal-miner Les Burgess and his wife Lily. Her first stage appearance was as an eight-year-old ingenue in the pantomime Babes in the Wood at a local miners' welfare institute, and at the age of nine she won first prize in a national poetry competition. At the age of 11 she won the Carrol Levis and His Discoveries talent show and thereafter changed her stage name to "Jackie Trent", having lived in Stoke-on-Trent for the previous few years. She sang at local venues and was known as "the Vera Lynn of the Potteries".

Her first single, "Pick Up the Pieces", was released in 1962 on the Oriole label, but it was not until Pye Records and three years later that she scored her first hit with "Where Are You Now", written by Tony Hatch and Trent, who at that time were involved in a successful professional collaboration with Petula Clark. "Where Are You Now" reached number one in the UK singles chart in 1965, topping the chart for one week. It reached number three in Canada. The song was featured in the popular TV series It's Dark Outside. The song was written and recorded in just four days after Hatch was asked by Granada TV to produce a song for the female lead in the programme to be seen on screen playing to herself. The lyrics were written by Trent in December 1964, just before she embarked on a three-month tour of South Africa. When the song first appeared on the TV programme, many viewers contacted shops and publications to inquire where they could buy the record with sales accelerating. The song reached number one in May 1965, replacing the Beatles' "Ticket to Ride".

Petula Clark's 1966 hit, "I Couldn't Live Without Your Love" was inspired by the ongoing affair between Trent and Hatch, and they subsequently went public with their relationship. In August 1967 they were married in Kensington. Their duet "The Two Of Us" topped the Australian charts and created a demand for concert and cabaret performances earning the duo the nickname of "Mr & Mrs Music".

Although she recorded several singles and albums, both as a solo artist and with her husband, Trent was more successful as a songwriter than a singer. In addition to their compositions for Clark, over the years she and Hatch wrote extensively for other artists, including Frank Sinatra, Dean Martin, Jack Jones, Nancy Wilson, Des O'Connor, Val Doonican, The Montanas, Shirley Bassey, and Vikki Carr.

In 1968 the couple also wrote the song "Joanna", a hit for Scott Walker.

In the late 1960s, Trent returned to the stage with a UK tour of the musical Nell, playing Gwynne opposite Hermione Baddeley as the title character. The show opened at the Richmond Theatre for a season in 1970.

=== 1970s ===
In 1970, Trent recorded the Les Vandyke-composed "I'll Be Near You" and in March that year she appeared on the cover of the British music magazine NME. The 1970s saw Hatch and Trent diversify into the world of musical theatre. The first of their projects, The Card, based on Arnold Bennett's novel, with book by Keith Waterhouse and Willis Hall, ran in London's West End with Jim Dale and Millicent Martin in the starring roles. (Coincidentally, Clark had starred in the 1952 film version with Sir Alec Guinness). An original cast album was released in 1975. A rewritten version of the show, starring Peter Duncan and Hayley Mills, played the Regent's Park Open Air Theatre in the 1990s and spawned a new cast album.

The second Hatch/Trent musical was Rock Nativity, with book and lyrics by David Wood. Initiated and produced by Cameron Mackintosh, it first played in Newcastle upon Tyne. An updated version of the show toured nationally in 1976, and was broadcast nationally by Scottish TV. A full-length concert version was also recorded at the Cork Opera House for transmission by RTÉ.

In 1972, the couple wrote the song "We'll Be With You", a celebration of Trent's home town football club Stoke City reaching the final of the Football League Cup. Released under the name 'The Potters' (the club's nickname), the song was recorded using Pye Records' outside broadcast unit and featured the team and supporters. Some 40 years on it is still played at all Stoke City home games and reached number 34 on the UK chart. The couple wrote the theme for the game show Mr and Mrs for Border Television which was used from 1975.

=== Theme to Neighbours ===
After Trent and Hatch relocated to Australia in the 1980s, they were asked to write the theme song for the television soap-opera Neighbours. The soap opera was going to be called Ramsay Street, before the couple penned the song. Trent told Jessie Stoelwinder from The West Australian, "We wrote the song as Neighbours because we said Ramsay Street was too close to Coronation Street, which was the major soap in Britain." The theme was written and recorded in a day and Trent said "We called in Barry Crocker at about 10pm to put his voice on it and it was on the producer's desk by 10am the following morning. And they loved it, so the series was then called Neighbours."

=== Recording career ===
In a recording career spanning 1962–1990, Trent issued a total of twelve albums, five compilations and 51 singles.

=== Later years ===
After returning to the UK, Trent toured with the musical High Society, in 1995.

In 2014 Trent worked with the Porthill Players on a stage show of her life. Prior to her death, she had been scheduled to appear in Jackie in May 2015.

== Personal life ==
When Trent and Hatch married in August 1967, Hatch already had two daughters from his first marriage. The couple went on to have a son and daughter together. They separated in 1995 and divorced in 2002. Hatch later married Maggie Clough in May 2005, living with her in Spain.

Trent married Colin Gregory in November 2005. She died in hospital on 21 March 2015, aged 74, in Menorca, Spain, after a long illness.

== See also ==
- List of artists who reached number one on the UK Singles Chart
- List of performers on Top of the Pops
