= Downtown (Petula Clark song) =

1964 single by Petula Clark

- Solid centre edition of 1964 UK single

Single by Petula Clark

from the album Downtown
- B-side: "You'd Better Love Me"
- Released: 23 October 1964
- Recorded: 16 October 1964
- Studio: Pye (London)
- Genre: Pop
- Length: 3:05
- Label: Pye (UK); Warner Bros. (US)
- Songwriter: Tony Hatch
- Producer: Tony Hatch

Petula Clark singles chronology
"True Love Never Runs Smooth" (1964)	"Downtown" (1964)	"I Know a Place" (1965)

Official audio
- "Downtown" on YouTube

"Downtown" is a song written by the English composer Tony Hatch. Its lyrics speak of going to spend time in an urban downtown as a means of escape from everyday life. The 1964 version recorded by British singer Petula Clark and produced by Hatch became an international hit, reaching number one on the Billboard Hot 100 and number two on the UK singles chart. Hatch received the 1981 Ivor Novello award for Best Song Musically and Lyrically.

The song has been covered by many singers, including Dolly Parton, Emma Bunton and the Saw Doctors. Frank Sinatra recorded it on his album Strangers in the Night in 1966.

== Composition ==
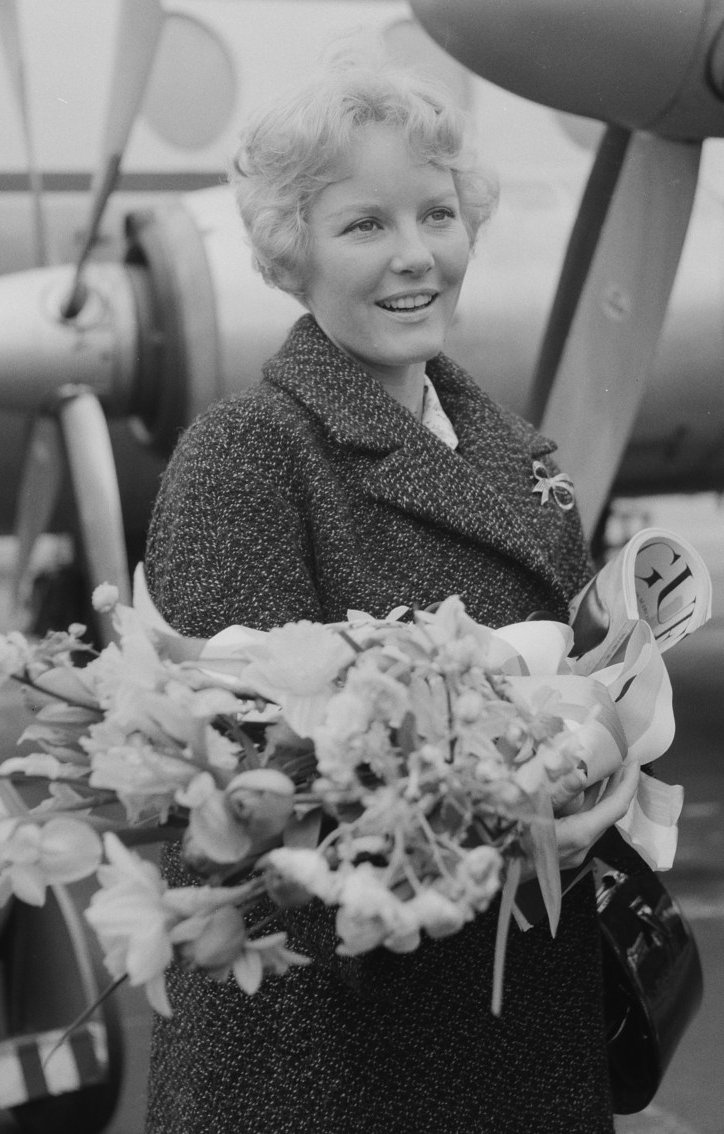
Clark in 1960

"Downtown" sample

Tony Hatch first worked with Petula Clark when he assisted her producer Alan A. Freeman on her 1961 No. 1 hit "Sailor". In 1963 Freeman asked Hatch to take over as Clark's regular producer. Hatch subsequently produced five English-language singles for Clark, none of which charted.

In late 1964 Hatch made his first visit to New York City; he spent three days there in search of material from music publishers for the artists he was producing. He recalled: "I was staying at a hotel on Central Park and I wandered down to Broadway and to Times Square and, naively, I thought I was downtown. ... I loved the whole atmosphere there and the [music] came to me very, very quickly". He was standing on the corner of 48th Street in Midtown, waiting for the traffic lights to change and looking towards Times Square, when "the melody first came to me, just as the neon signs went on."

Hatch envisaged his embryonic composition "as a sort of doo wop R&B song", which he thought to eventually pitch to the Drifters. He had scored his biggest success to date with the Searchers' "Sugar and Spice" modelled on the Drifters' hit "Sweets for My Sweet", and had also produced a cover version of the Drifters' "Up on the Roof" for Julie Grant. It has been said that Hatch gave Grant the opportunity to record "Downtown" and that she turned this down, but this does not accord with Hatch's statement that he played "Downtown" for Petula Clark within a few days of conceiving the melody and only completed the song's lyrics after Clark had asked to record it. Hatch has also said that, before Clark expressed interest in "Downtown", "it never occurred to me that a white woman could even sing it." Hatch has subsequently denied originally offering "Downtown" to the Drifters.

Within a few days of his New York City trip, Hatch visited Paris to present Clark with three or four songs he had acquired from New York publishers for Clark to consider recording at a London recording session scheduled for 16 October 1964, which was roughly two weeks away. Hatch said of the meeting: "She was not very enthusiastic about [the material] and asked me if I was working on anything new myself." According to Clark, besides the title lyric, Hatch had only written "one or two lines." Hatch recalled: "Reluctantly, I played her the tune of my New York inspiration and slipped in the word 'Downtown' in the appropriate places." Clark, who first heard "Downtown" from her kitchen, having stepped away to make a pot of tea, told Hatch: "That's the one I want to record." "Get that finished. Get a good lyric in it. Get a great arrangement and I think we'll at least have a song we're proud to record even if it isn't a hit."

== Recording ==
"Downtown" was recorded on 16 October 1964 at the Pye Studios in Marble Arch. Thirty minutes before the session was scheduled, Hatch was still touching up the song's lyrics in the studio's washroom. Hatch said of his arrangement: "I had to connect with young record buyers... but not alienate Pet[ula]'s older core audience... The trick was to make a giant orchestra sound like a rock band." Hatch insisted that all session personnel on his productions be recorded performing together. The session personnel for the recording of "Downtown" were assembled in Studio One of Pye Recording Studios and included eight violinists, two viola players and two cellists, four trumpeters and four trombonists, five woodwind players with flutes and oboes, percussionists, a bass player and a pianist.

Also playing on the session were guitarists Vic Flick, Jimmy Page and Big Jim Sullivan, as well as drummer Ronnie Verrell, while the Breakaways provided the vocal accompaniment. Bobby Graham was also credited as drummer on the session. Brian Brocklehurst stated in 1995 that he played upright bass at the session. Hatch's assistant Bob Leaper conducted. According to Petula Clark, the session for "Downtown" consisted of three takes with the second take ultimately chosen as the completed track yet, elsewhere, an "extended" version consisting of an instrumental and backing vocal track most likely from a session tape, makes this claim questionable.

== Impact ==
Tony Hatch would recall playing the completed "Downtown" track for Pye Records executives, saying: "Nobody knew what to make of it and no release date was set. Then Pye's general manager called and said Joe Smith – Warner Bros.' head of A&R – was in London looking for British material. When Joe heard Pet[ula]'s record, he loved it and scheduled the single for urgent release in the [United] States". When Hatch, surprised by Smith's enthusiasm for releasing "Downtown" in the US, asked if Smith didn't consider "Downtown" to be a "very English record" Smith replied: "It's perfect. It's just an observation from outside of America and it's just beautiful and just perfect."

In the wake of Smith's interest, "Downtown" was released in the UK on 23 October 1964. It entered the UK Top 50 dated 14 November 1964, ending a virtual two-year UK chart absence for Clark; of the ten singles she had released in the UK during that period only one, "Chariot", had appeared in even the lower charts (No. 39 in early 1963). "Downtown" rose to No. 2 UK in December 1964, remaining there for three weeks, kept out of the No. 1 position by the Beatles' "I Feel Fine". Clark was awarded a silver disc by Disc Weekly for the sale of over 250,000 copies of "Downtown" in the UK.

"Downtown" reached No. 2 in Ireland and No. 1 in Australia, New Zealand, Rhodesia and South Africa, and was also a hit in Denmark (No. 2), India (No. 3), the Netherlands (No. 4) and Norway (No. 8).

But "Downtown" had its greatest significance in the reception it was afforded in the United States, where it was released by Warner Bros. in November 1964: after early regional break-outs, notably in Detroit, Miami, and Washington D.C., "Downtown" debuted at No. 87 on the Hot 100 chart in the Billboard issue dated 19 December 1964. Despite the Christmas season typically being the worst time to break a new hit, "Downtown" shot up to No. 41 in its second week on the Hot 100 chart ascending in its third and fourth charting weeks to No. 12 and then No. 5; then after a subsequent single point advance to No. 4 "Downtown" leapt to No. 1 on the Billboard Hot 100 dated 23 January 1965, retaining that position a further week before being overtaken by the ascendancy of the Righteous Brothers' "You've Lost That Lovin' Feelin'". The song became the first No. 1 hit for the year 1965.

Petula Clark thus became the first UK female artist to have a US No. 1 hit during the rock era and the second in the annals of US charted music, Vera Lynn having hit No. 1 in the US with "Auf Wiederseh'n Sweetheart" in 1952. "Downtown" also made Clark the first UK female artist to have a single certified as a Gold record for US sales of one million units. On Billboard's annual Disk Jockey poll, "Downtown" was voted the second best single release of 1965 and Petula Clark was voted third most popular female vocalist. "Downtown" would be the first of fifteen consecutive hits Clark would place in the US Top 40 during a period when she had considerably less chart impact in her native UK, there reaching the Top 40 eight times.

Petula Clark, who had been playing to her French-speaking fans in small venues in Quebec when "Downtown" entered the US charts, swiftly cut non-English versions of the song for the markets in France, Italy and Germany; the absence in each region's language of a two-syllable equivalent of "downtown" necessitated a radical lyric recasting for the versions aimed at France ("Dans le temps"), Italy ("Ciao Ciao", winning the Festivalbar, a juke-box contest) and Spain ("Chao Chao") which climbed the charts to No. 6, No. 2 and – for three weeks – No. 1; "Dans le temps" also reached No. 18 on Belgium's French-language chart. The title and lyric "Downtown" was retained for an otherwise German version which was the most successful foreign-language version, reaching No. 1 in Germany, No. 3 in Austria, and No. 11 on the charts for the Flemish region of Belgium. The Spanish version, however, was not recorded by Petula Clark herself but bis several Spanish artists, among them Gelu.

Mrs. Miller reached number 82 in the US with her version in 1966.

In 2013, Petula Clark re-recorded the song for her album Lost in You, with new arrangements, as a ballad and with a soft voice, giving it a new life.

=== Popular culture ===
In the 1978 film Jaws 2, as Police Chief Martin Brody enters the brand new Holiday Inn hotel prior to its grand opening ceremony on Amity Island, an instrumental version of the song (performed by the Amity High School Band) can be heard.

In the 1991 film Flight of the Intruder, Brad Johnson and Willem Dafoe sing the chorus portion of "Downtown" as they are flying their A-6 Intruder back to the aircraft carrier after the unauthorized bombing of the "Sam City" section of Hanoi in North Vietnam.

In the 1993 biographical anthology film Thirty Two Short Films About Glenn Gould, the song plays throughout "Truck Stop", the fifteenth segment.

In the 1996 Seinfeld episode "The Bottle Deposit", the song is referenced by George Costanza's supervisor Wilhelm when discussing a project Costanza is in the dark about, prompting George Costanza and Jerry Seinfeld to analyze the song's lyrics for clues.

The song is on the soundtrack of the 1999 film Girl, Interrupted and is sung in character by Winona Ryder and Angelina Jolie.

The song is featured prominently in the beginning of the 2006 Lost episode "A Tale of Two Cities".

The song plays on a loop in a scene from the 2019 film Escape Room.

Immediately before the 2020 Nashville bombing, the song was played from the vehicle which exploded, followed by an audio warning to "evacuate now". Clark released a statement expressing her "shock and disbelief" at the explosion in Nashville.

The song is featured in the Edgar Wright horror film Last Night in Soho performed by actress Anya Taylor-Joy.

The song is featured in the end credits of the series 4 finale of the Amazon Prime series Clarkson's Farm.

The song was used briefly in the 1997 British dark comedy crime film Twin Town.

The song was used in the analog Horror series The Walten Files in Part 5 of the Series.

== Charts ==
=== Weekly charts ===
Chart (1964–1965)	Peak position
Australia (ARIA)	1
Austria (Ö3 Austria Top 40)	3
Belgium (Ultratop 50 Flanders)	11
Canada Top Singles (RPM)	1
French-Canadian Records	1
Ireland The Irish Times	1
Luxembourg (Billboard)	2
The Netherlands (Single Top 100)	3
New Zealand (Lever Hit Parades)	1
Norway (VG-lista)	8
South Africa (RiSA)	1
UK Singles (Official Charts)	2
US Billboard Hot 100	1
West Germany (GfK)	1

=== Year-end charts ===
Chart (1965)	Position
US Billboard Hot 100	6

== Certifications ==
Region	Certification	Certified units/sales
United Kingdom (BPI)	Silver	250,000
United States (RIAA)	Gold	1,600,000
Summaries
Worldwide	—	3,000,000

== Accolades ==
- Grammy Award for Best Rock and Roll Recording, 1965
- Ivor Novello Award for "Outstanding Song of the Year" 1964
- Gold Record (1965) Awarded for One Million US sales
- Cash Box International Gold Award (1965)
- Radio Caroline Bell Award (UK) (1965)
- Festivalbar 1965 winner ("Ciao ciao")
- Grammy Hall of Fame (2003)
- Film & TV Music Award for Best Use of a Song in a Television Program (2007)

== Downtown '88 ==
"Downtown '88"

Single by Petula Clark

from the album My Greatest
- Released: 6 June 1988
- Genre: Dance; acid house; techno
- Length: 3:25
- Label: PRT
- Songwriter: Tony Hatch
- Producers: Peter Slaghuis, Eddy Ouwens

Petula Clark singles chronology
"Life's a Game" (1988)	"Downtown '88" (1988)	"I Couldn't Live Without Your Love '89" (1989)

The original 1964 recording was remixed and released in 1988 as "Downtown '88" which became a top ten UK hit. The track also charted in Australia (No. 58), Belgium (Dutch chart No. 19), Finland (No. 3), Germany (No. 13) and Ireland (No. 14). Clark recalled: "The first time I heard the '88 remix of 'Downtown' I was in my car. I thought: 'This sounds familiar. I wonder who's singing this?' and it turned out to be me! They'd wiped out the orchestra and put on some kind of ticka-ticka-tick thing. I don't know what the hell it was, but it turned into a hit. They don't have to ask my permission, if you know what I mean. But it's fine. I find it rather flattering, actually. And quite amusing."

Clark promoted "Downtown '88" in a live performance on 15 December 1988 broadcast of Top of the Pops (TOTP) – the track had been aired on the preceding TOTP broadcast of 8 December 1988 and had moved from No. 37 to No. 24 on the UK Singles Chart dated (i.e. for the week ending) 12 December 1988: Clark's live TOTP performance evidently facilitated the rise of "Downtown '88" to No. 13 on the UK chart dated 17 December 1988, while the track reached its No. 10 peak on the UK chart dated 24 December 1988, that being the singles rankings for the first full week after Clark's TOTP live performance of "Downtown '88".

=== Charts ===
==== Weekly charts ====
Chart (1988−1989)	Peak position
Australia (ARIA)	58
Belgium (Ultratop)	19
Ireland (IRMA)	14
UK Singles (Official Charts)	10
West Germany (GfK)	13

==== Year-end charts ====
Chart (1989)	Position
West Germany (Media Control)	83

== Other re-recordings ==
In October 2011, Clark recorded several lines of "Downtown" for inclusion in the remake by Irish band the Saw Doctors which was credited to the Saw Doctors featuring Petula Clark – (see below). Clark's own 2013 album release Lost in You features a new version of "Downtown": Clark said she was uninterested when it was first suggested she again record "Downtown", then "I was played this beautiful [instrumental] track ...And I said it was lovely, and they told me it was [intended for] 'Downtown.' I got to the microphone and I didn't know how I was going to sing it, and it really feels like a new song." Reviewing Lost in You for MusicOHM.com, Philip Matusavage writes of the "Downtown" remake: "already a song loaded with melancholy, the stately version here acquires new meaning with its weary but amiable delivery summoning forth powerful nostalgia and the sense of someone fondly remembering their youth."

== Dolly Parton version ==
"Downtown"

Single by Dolly Parton

from the album The Great Pretender
- B-side: "The Great Pretender"
- Released: 12 March 1984
- Recorded: 1983
- Genre: Country pop
- Label: RCA
- Songwriter: Tony Hatch
- Producer: Val Garay

Dolly Parton singles chronology
"Save the Last Dance for Me" (1983)	"Downtown" (1984)	"Tennessee Homesick Blues" (1984)

Dolly Parton recorded "Downtown" in Nashville in 1983 in the sessions for her covers album The Great Pretender, a Val Garay production which focused on hits from the 1950s and 1960s. "Downtown" served as the album's second single release in March 1984 reaching No. 36 on the Billboard C&W chart and crossing over to No. 80 on the Billboard Hot 100 pop chart: to date "Downtown" marks Parton's final solo Hot 100 appearance. Parton's version altered some of the lyrics: "Listen to the rhythm of a gentle bossa nova" became "Listen to the rhythm of the music that they're playing". Petula Clark has described Parton's take on "Downtown" as "cute, because she didn't even try to sound like my recording."

=== Charts ===
Chart (1984)	Peak position
US Billboard Hot 100	80
US Billboard Adult Contemporary	20
US Billboard Hot Country Singles	36
Canadian RPM Country Tracks	20

== Emma Bunton version ==
"Downtown"

Single by Emma Bunton

from the album Life in Mono
- B-side: "Something Tells Me (Something's Going to Happen)"; "Perhaps Perhaps Perhaps"
- Released: 13 November 2006
- Recorded: 2006
- Studio: AIR (London); Angel (London)
- Genre: Soul
- Length: 3:24
- Label: Universal
- Songwriter: Tony Hatch
- Producer: Simon Franglen

Emma Bunton singles chronology
"Crickets Sing for Anamaria" (2004)	"Downtown" (2006)	"All I Need to Know" (2007)

Music video
- "Downtown" on YouTube

=== Background ===
BBC News announced on 20 October 2006 that Emma Bunton would record a remake of the Petula Clark hit "Downtown" to be the 2006 official BBC Children in Need single, with Bunton quoted as saying: "I've always loved 'Downtown'...and I'm really looking forward to putting my own stamp on it. The track's good fun and one everyone will know." Bunton, whose admiration for Petula Clark was evident on the 2004 Free Me album, recorded "Downtown" at AIR Studios' Lyndhurst Hall location with Simon Franglen producing; the orchestra for the track was recorded at Angel Recording Studios with Gavin Wright conducting. The track was released on 13 November 2006 and Bunton premiered her version of "Downtown" on the 2006 Children in Need telethon which began broadcast 17 November 2006.

Although Bunton said that she knew "Downtown" composer Tony Hatch "quite well", Petula Clark said that neither she [i.e. Clark] nor Hatch had prior knowledge of Bunton's remake. Clark also stated that she considered Bunton's remake to be an "outright copy" of Clark's original recording: "I could ask: 'What's the point'...but Emma's recording is wonderful and...for a great cause" (i.e. Children in Need).

=== Impact ===
"Downtown" by Emma Bunton debuted on the UK singles chart 25 November 2006 at No. 24. Central FM noted Bunton's chart debut, declaring "Downtown" "the song she was born to cover...One of the all time great pop songs, ['Downtown'] was long overdue for a revival and Emma Bunton pays it the respect it deserves." The Spanish radio station predicted "Downtown" would rise to the Top 3 in its second week and the single did indeed jump to No. 3 on the chart for 2 December 2006 having sold 30,582 units in the relevant week: the mid-week stats had ranked "Downtown" at No. 2 behind "Patience" by Take That but on the chart for the full week Bunton was bested not only by Take That at No. 1 but by the previous week's No. 1, "Smack That" by Akon, which outsold "Downtown" by 57 copies.

Total UK sales for "Downtown" by Emma Bunton were at 83,000 units.

=== Music video ===
Directed by Harvey & Carolyn, (the directors who also directed her video for her single "Maybe") the sexually suggestive music video for the single is set in a hotel bedroom featuring Bunton as a maid. It includes appearances from contestants from the BBC's reality television show Strictly Come Dancing and features cameos from Matt Dawson, Louisa Lytton, Carol Smillie, Spoony, Mark Ramprakash, Claire King, Peter Schmeichel, Craig Revel Horwood, Anton du Beke, Brendan Cole, Erin Boag, Lilia Kopylova, Karen Hardy, and Darren Bennett. According to Mark Ramprakash the video was shot at "a big house near Baker Street".

The video drew negative reaction for evidently skewing the phrase "go downtown" into a sexual term. Bunton would constantly evade or deny this allegation, as when Michael Baggs of Popjustice put to her: "The dancers in the 'Downtown' video seem to know you very well indeed. So well that they are all pointing at your fanny. Was this your idea?", Bunton's response being: "I don't understand where this has come from. It is a dance routine and it is nothing to do with anything like that. It is everyone else's dirty little minds. Especially yours. It worries me because it is a classic and you can't make classics rude." Singer Jann Arden who recorded "Downtown" for her 2007 album Uncover Me reacted to Bunton's "Downtown" video with the statement: "Petula Clark would slap [Bunton's] face" though in fact Clark herself would state to being untroubled by Bunton's evidently salacious interpretation of "Downtown": "It's a pop song, for God's sake. It's not a hymn!"

=== Charts ===
==== Weekly charts ====
Chart (2006)	Peak position
Europe (Eurochart Hot 100)	12
Ireland (IRMA)	36
Scottish Singles Sales (Official Charts)	2
UK Singles (Official Charts)	3

==== Year-end charts ====
Chart (2006)	Position
UK Singles (OCC)	118

== Saw Doctors version ==
In October 2011, Irish band the Saw Doctors remade "Downtown" with Petula Clark singing some lines: the track is credited to the Saw Doctors featuring Petula Clark. According to Saw Doctors' member Leo Moran the group habitually played snippets of well-known songs during their encore numbers: "One night for no particular reason we did 'Downtown' and you could see people loved it. All ages. You could see it brought joy to people's faces." Some time later the Saw Doctors learned their producer Philip Tennant was friends with Petula Clark's manager John Williams and an invitation was conveyed to Clark to sing on a Saw Doctors' remake of "Downtown"; Clark being agreeable, a session was booked in a London recording studio to allow the Irish group to liaison with the European-based Clark and "Downtown" was recorded over two days with Clark arriving to record her vocal on the second day. Moran recalls: "We [the Saw Doctors] did a whole lot of work the first day. [Petula Clark] came in the second evening and we discovered that the song was in the wrong key. So we had to scrap all of the first day's work and put down the backing track with Petula because she only had a few hours that evening and wasn't able to come back the following day. It was exciting, exhilarating, scary and privileged … rolled into one."

Top Irish cinematographer Eugene O' Connor (Father Ted) directed the video for the Saw Doctor's "Downtown" which was uploaded to YouTube on 17 November 2011. Shot on the nights of 9–10 November 2011, the video focuses on the band's members walking through the town center of Galway (lead vocalist Davy Carton is also seen briefly riding in a car). Footage of Clark was shot in Paris and spliced into the completed video in which she mainly appears on the screens of televisions displayed in a shop window (the shop is in fact clothing retailer Anthony Ryans) outside of which the Saw Doctors perform on the street in the company of eight members of the Galway City Cougars cheerleading squad and also a fire juggler.

Radio presenter Ray Foley (Today FM) began a campaign to make the Saw Doctors' "Downtown" the Christmas No. 1 in Ireland for 2011 encouraging sales of the track upon its 16 December 2011 release with the intent of propelling it to the No. 1 position on the Irish Singles Chart for the week ending 22 December 2011 and the Saw Doctors' "Downtown" was indeed No. 1 on iTunes Ireland for the relevant period. However, on the Irish Singles Chart dated 22 December 2011 the track debuted at No. 2 with "Cannonball" by Little Mix retaining the No. 1 position largely because of "Cannonball"'s greater availability as a CD single – 10,000 units as opposed to "Downtown"'s 2000 – making "Cannonball" a more attractive prospect for gift-buyers.

On the Irish Singles Chart dated 29 December 2011 "Downtown" by the Saw Doctors featuring Petula Clark was ranked at No. 43 in its second and final week on the chart.
