= Tony Hatch =

English composer (born 1939)

Tony Hatch OBE
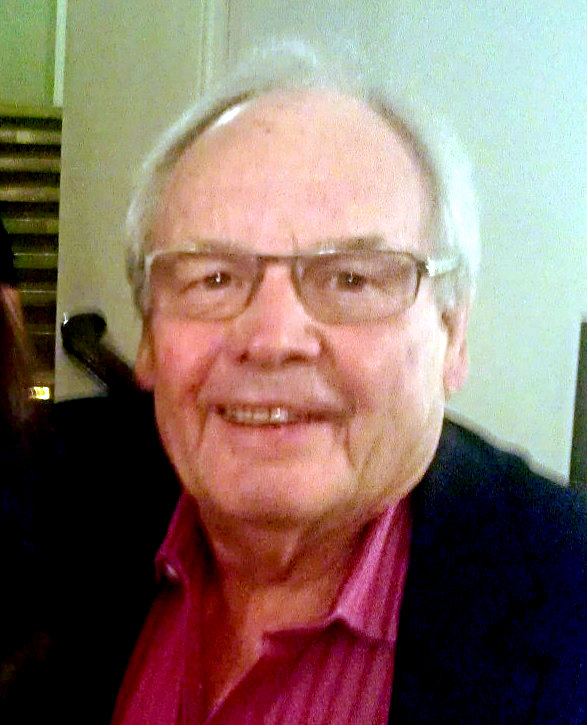
- Hatch in 2013

Background information
- Also known as: Mark Anthony, Fred Nightingale
- Born: Anthony Peter Hatch; 30 June 1939 (age 87); Pinner, Middlesex, England
- Genres: Pop; theme music
- Occupations: Composer; songwriter; pianist; music arranger; producer
- Instrument: Keyboards
- Years active: 1959–present
- Website: tonyhatch.co.uk

Anthony Peter Hatch OBE (born 30 June 1939) is an English composer for musical theatre and television. He is also a songwriter, pianist, arranger and producer.

== Early life and early career ==
Hatch was born in Pinner, Middlesex. Encouraged by his musical abilities, his mother—a pianist herself–enrolled him in the London Choir School in Wansunt Road, Bexley, Kent when he was 10. Instead of continuing at the Royal Academy of Music, he left school in 1955 and found a job with Robert Mellin Music in London's Tin Pan Alley.

Not long after working as a tea boy, Hatch was writing songs (under the name Mark Anthony) and entered the recording industry when he joined The Rank Organisation's new subsidiary Top Rank Records; there he worked for future Decca Records A&R man Dick Rowe. While he served his National Service, he became involved with the Band of the Coldstream Guards.

On his return in 1959, Hatch began producing Top Rank artists such as Bert Weedon, the then unknown Adam Faith ("Ah, Poor Little Baby"), Josh MacRae (together with MacRae's early recordings with Scottish folk trio the Reivers), Jackie Dennis, Carry On comedy actor Kenneth Connor, and the Knightsbridge Strings, and started his own recording career with a version of Russ Conway's piano instrumental "Side Saddle". Although he used his real name Tony Hatch as a performer and producer, until about 1964 virtually all his songs were credited to Mark Anthony.

In 1960, Garry Mills's recording of the Mark Anthony composition "Look for a Star", featured in the film Circus of Horrors, became a Top Ten hit in the UK for Top Rank. Four versions of the song charted simultaneously in the United States, including Mills's original and a version by "Garry Miles" (a recording alias of future member of the Crickets, Buzz Cason). Top Rank, despite some worldwide success with artists such as Jack Scott and the Fireballs, ultimately failed because of an unusual distribution arrangement with EMI.

A swift succession of events ensued through 1961 that Top Rank was sold to EMI, briefly operated as a subsidiary, with hits by John Leyton, and shuttered, with its artists transferred to other EMI labels. Hatch moved on to a part-time job with Pye Records, where he assisted his new mentor, Alan A. Freeman, with the recording of "Sailor", a number 1 hit for Petula Clark.

As Mark Anthony, Hatch continued to write songs for Pye artists, including "Messing About on the River" for Josh MacRae. In 1963, Philadelphia teen idol Bobby Rydell hit the charts with "Forget Him" written and produced by Hatch (still writing as Mark Anthony); Hatch produced, arranged and wrote for other American stars such as Chubby Checker, Connie Francis, Pat Boone, Big Dee Irwin and Keely Smith. In 1963 he wrote (under the pseudonym of Fred Nightingale) the Searchers' hit "Sugar and Spice". By mid-1964, Hatch finally began using his own name as a composer regularly, with Tony Hatch being the credited author of many of Petula Clark's biggest mid-1960s hits, including "Downtown", "I Know a Place", and "Sign of the Times", among others. In February 1964, Hatch's song "I Love the Little Things" won the BBC's A Song for Europe contest, beating out the other five songs performed by Matt Monro; thus becoming the UK's entry in the Eurovision Song Contest 1964, where it placed second. The single of the track failed to reach the UK singles chart.

In November 1965, Hatch performed with David Bowie (then known as Davy Jones) in the band the Lower Third, in an unsuccessful audition for the BBC's Talent Selection Group. The band were not picked up for broadcast, with one member of the judging panel commenting "I don't think they'll get better with more rehearsals."

Hatch produced many artists for Pye and other labels including the Searchers, David Bowie, Mark Wynter, the Settlers, the Viscounts, Julie Grant, Gary Miller, Benny Hill, the Overlanders, Roy Budd, the Brook Brothers, Jimmy Justice, the Montanas, Miki & Griff, Emile Ford, Craig Douglas, Bruce Forsyth, Norman Vaughan, Sue Nicholls, the Breakaways, Julie Budd, Buddy Greco, Sacha Distel, Anne Shelton, Sweet Sensation, David Parton, and Graduate among others.

Hatch's production of the Searchers' entire Pye catalogue was significant in that nearly every song was issued in true stereo. The only other UK chart acts with so much stereo were George Martin producing the Beatles and Ron Richards producing the Hollies (although a handful of early Hollies albums were initially issued only in mono).

Hatch also recorded various lounge style albums with his orchestra; he also made solo piano recordings and some tracks as a vocalist.

== Collaboration with Petula Clark ==
After "Valentino", the first of Hatch's compositions to be recorded by Petula Clark, he became her regular producer. They collaborated on a series of French-language recordings for Vogue Records. (Clark, whose husband was French and who spoke the language fluently, had a successful career throughout Europe.) Hatch became one of her regular songwriting partners, in addition to supplying English lyrics for songs she had composed with French lyricists.

In 1964, Hatch made his first trip to New York City in search of new material for Clark. The visit inspired him to write "Downtown", originally with The Drifters in mind. When Clark heard the still unfinished tune, she told him that if he could write lyrics to match the quality of the music, she would record the song as her next single. Its release transformed her into a huge international star, topping charts globally early in 1965, and introducing her to the US market. "Downtown" peaked at number two in Britain, stuck behind the Beatles' "I Feel Fine". Clark then charted with three consecutive hits written by Hatch: "I Know a Place", "You'd Better Come Home", and "Round Every Corner", which all charted higher in the US than in the UK. She and Hatch co-wrote "You're The One", which peaked at 22 in Britain but which gave The Vogues a major debut hit in the States. Tony Hatch and Petula Clark became established as the British equivalent of Burt Bacharach and Dionne Warwick. In 1965 Hatch's first album under his own name was released. The Downtown Sound of Tony Hatch, features instrumental versions of some of his best known songs, along with new compositions.

The song "Call Me", written for and recorded by Petula Clark in 1965, was recorded by Chris Montez later in the year. Released in November 1965, Montez's version entered the US Easy Listening Top 40 in Billboard that December, and the Billboard Hot 100 in January 1966, peaking that March on the Easy Listening chart at #2 and on the Hot 100 at #22.

Petula Clark's run of 1966 and 1967 hits include many written by Hatch: "My Love" (a US number one), "A Sign of the Times", "I Couldn't Live Without Your Love", "Who Am I", "Don't Sleep in the Subway", "Colour My World", and "The Other Man's Grass Is Always Greener". He wrote all of these (except "My Love") with his wife Jackie Trent. "A Sign of the Times", "Who Am I" and "Colour My World" were not hits in Britain.

== Collaboration with Jackie Trent and later career ==
In 1964, Hatch was hired to write his first television theme, for the soap opera Crossroads. This became one of his best-known compositions and was re-worked by Wings. He continued to write television themes throughout the 1960s, including the themes to Man Alive, The Champions, and The Doctors. When asked to write a song to be featured in the Inspector Rose series, It's Dark Outside, he supplied "Where Are You Now?", with lyrics and vocals by a recently signed Pye artist, Jackie Trent. The song reached number one in the UK singles chart.

Although still married to his first wife, Hatch began an affair with Jackie Trent, who had become a frequent songwriting collaborator. This ongoing affair was the inspiration for the song "I Couldn't Live Without Your Love".

Hatch and Trent married in 1967. Their duet "The Two Of Us" reached number three in the Australian charts in 1967 and created a demand for concert and cabaret performances earning the duo the nickname of "Mr & Mrs Music". The couple also wrote the song "Joanna", a hit for Scott Walker. One of their more unusual collaborations was the song "We'll Be With You" written for Stoke City Football Club in the club's successful run for the League Cup in 1972. The song featured the team and supporters and was recorded at the supporters club using Pye's mobile studio. The song is still sung by fans as the team runs out on matchdays.

During the 1970s, Hatch and Trent diversified into musical theatre. Their first project, The Card, based on Arnold Bennett's novel, with book by Keith Waterhouse and Willis Hall, ran in London's West End with Jim Dale and Millicent Martin in the lead roles. (Coincidentally, Petula Clark had starred in the 1952 film version with Alec Guinness.) An original cast album was released in 1975. A rewritten version of the show, starring Peter Duncan and Hayley Mills, played the Regent's Park Open Air Theatre in the 1990s and spawned a new cast album. The second Hatch/Trent musical was Rock Nativity, with book and lyrics by David Wood. Initiated and produced by Cameron Mackintosh, it first played in Newcastle upon Tyne. An updated version of the show toured nationally in 1976 and was broadcast nationally by Scottish TV. A full-length concert version was recorded at the Cork Opera House for the Irish television state broadcaster RTÉ.

In 1972, Hatch composed the original theme to Emmerdale Farm, as well as the themes to Hadleigh and Sportsnight. During the 1970s, he was also a regular panellist on the talent show New Faces, where his blunt style of assessing the contestants proved to be a forerunner of approaches to come in later, similar series. In 1975, at the request of Kerry Packer, Hatch and Trent produced the first colour musical television special in Australia.

After completing the music score to the movie Sweeney 2 (1978), Hatch and Trent moved to Dublin, where they remained for four years, hosting their own TV series, Words And Music and It's A Musical World. Hatch continued to produce hit television themes for series such as Seagull Island and Airline before moving to Australia in 1982. While there, the couple wrote one the theme for the television soap opera Neighbours.

Hatch produced the Original Australian Cast Recording of the Andrew Lloyd Webber musical Cats in 1985, whilst serving as the show's production musical director.

Hatch and Trent separated in 1995 and divorced in 2002.

Trent died on 21 March 2015 in Menorca after a long illness.[1]

== Other later events ==
In 2003, a disco remix of the original recording of "Downtown" was released in Australia by The OUTpsiDER with the blessing of both Hatch and Clark. A souvenir CD box set of six of Hatch's albums (four from the 1960s and two from the 1970s – including one with Jackie Trent), was released in 2005.

Hatch performed at the Hackney Empire on 9 September 2012, for a Grand Order of Water Rats evening - 'The Golden Years of Variety'. At the piano he played the theme tunes of Emmerdale Farm, Neighbours, and Crossroads and encouraged a sing-along to "Downtown".

On 13 June 2013, Hatch was inducted into the Songwriters Hall of Fame, at a ceremony held at the New York Marriott Marquis. He was accompanied by his wife, Maggie. Hatch performed in October 2016 at the inaugural Variety Hall of Fame Awards, with Petula Clark, and hosting "As Heard on TV" on BBC Radio 2 on 1 November 2016.

Hatch was appointed Officer of the Order of the British Empire (OBE) in the 2020 Birthday Honours for services to music and charity.

== Personal life ==
Hatch has two daughters from his first marriage to Jean Matthews. He also has a son and daughter from his marriage to Jackie Trent. He has two stepchildren with his third wife, Maggie Hatch, the couple lived in Menorca, Spain.

== Selected compositions ==
=== Film and television ===
- 1962: Stork Talk (Film)
- 1964: Crossroads (TV)
- 1965: Man Alive (TV)
- 1967: The Champions (TV)
- 1969: Who-Dun-It (TV)
- 1969: The Doctors (TV)
- 1972: Travels with My Aunt (Film)
- 1972: Emmerdale Farm (TV)
- 1972: Mr & Mrs (TV)
- 1973: Hadleigh (TV)
- 1973: Love Story (TV)
- 1973: Sportsnight (TV)
- 1977: Backs to the Land (TV)
- 1978: Sweeney 2 (Film)
- 1981: Seagull Island (TV)
- 1982: Airline (TV)
- 1983: Waterloo Station (TV)
- 1985: Neighbours (TV)

== See also ==
- Category:Songs written by Tony Hatch
