= Polygon Records discography =

This is a discography of Polygon Records, a British label which ran from 1950 to 1955.

== 10" 78rpm singles ==
- P. 1001 Louis Prima and his Orchestra with Keely Smith - "Oh Babe!" / "Piccolina Lena" (Dec-50)
- P. 1002 Petula Clark with the Stargazers and the Harold Smart Quintet - "You Are My True Love" / "You're the Sweetest in the Land" (Dec-50)
- P. 1003 Petula Clark - "Beloved Be Faithful" / "Fly Away Peter, Fly Away Paul" (Feb-51)
- P. 1004 Petula Clark - "Tennessee Waltz" / "Sleepy Eyes" (Feb-51)
- P. 1005 Petula Clark - "Teasin'" / "Black Note Serenade" (Apr-51)
- P. 1006 Jimmy Young - "Life's Desire" / "Don't Worry 'Bout Me" (Apr-51)
- P. 1007 Ray Martin and his Concert Orchestra - "Muriella" / "Gipsy Fiddler" (Jun-51)
- P. 1008 Petula Clark - "May Kway" / "Clickety Clack" (Jun-51)
- P. 1009 Petula Clark and Jimmy Young - "Mariandl" / "Broken Heart" (Jun-51)
- P. 1010 Jimmy Young - "Would I Love You" / "West Wind" (Jun-51)
- P. 1011 Jimmy Young (* with Barbara Anne) - "Land Of Make-Believe"* / "Park on a Sunday" (Jun-51)
- P. 1012 The Frank Baron Trio - "Moontide" / "Rotten Row" (Oct-51)
- P. 1013 Jimmy Young - "Too Young" / "How Can I Leave You" (Aug-51)
- P. 1014 Jan Rosol - "La Ronde De L'Amour (Love's Roundabout)" / "Melancolie" (Aug-51)
- P. 1015 Hamish Menzies with his Rhythm - "I'm Just a Coconut Collector" / "Look Out!" (Sep-51)
- P. 1016 Hamish Menzies with his Rhythm - "I Wanna Hear it From You" / "Too Many Love Songs" (Sep-51)
- P. 1017 Jimmy Young - "Vanity" / "Only Fools" (Oct-51)
- P. 1018 Jimmy Young - "Because Of You" / "So Many Times Have I Cried Over You" (Oct-51)
- P. 1019 Hamish Menzies with his Rhythm - "Phantom Pianist" / "Piccadilly Piper" (Nov-51)
- P. 1020 Hamish Menzies with his Rhythm - "By Kind Permission of Love" / "Alibis" (Dec-51)
- P. 1021 Petula Clark - "Cold Cold Heart" / "That's How a Love Song is Born" (Nov-51)
- P. 1022 Petula Clark - "Tell Me Truly" / "Song of the Mermaid" (Nov-51)
- P. 1023 Frank Chacksfield and his Orchestra and Chorus - "Sleigh Ride For Two" / "Kate-Chen" (Nov-51)
- P. 1024 Jimmy Young - "Green Glens of Antrim" / "And So to Sleep Again" (Nov-51)
- P. 1025 Jimmy Young - "I'll Sing to You" / "My Love and Devotion" (Dec-51)
- P. 1026 Luckie Robinson - "Unforgettable" / "No Man is An Island" (Dec-51)
- P. 1027 Frank Chacksfield and his Orchestra - "Prelude To a Memory" / "Flirtation Waltz (Valse Coquette)" (Dec-51)
- P. 1028 Max Wall - "Me and My Tune" / "Take it Easy" (Dec-51)
- P. 1029 La Chanson De Lausanne (The Swiss Choir Of Lausanne) - "Magali" / "Chanson A Danser" (Jan-52)
- P. 1030 La Chanson De Lausanne (The Swiss Choir Of Lausanne) - "Aux Marches Du Palais" / "La Jardinière Du Roy" (Jan-52)
- P. 1031 Robin Richmond - "That Ever-Lovin' Rag" / "What A Difference a Day Made" (Jan-52)
- P. 1032 Jimmy Young - "Sin" / "It's All in the Game" (Jan-52)
- P. 1033 Jimmy Young - "Cry" / "Time Alone Will Tell" (Jan-52)
- P. 1034 Evelyne Dorat - "L'Ames des Poetes (At Last, At Last)" / "En Buvant Le Vin Doux" (Jan-52)
- P. 1035 Jimmy Young - "The Little White Cloud That Cried" / "Turn Back the Hands of Time" (Feb-52)
- P. 1036 Gwen Liddel - "It's All Over But the Memories" / "Mistakes" (Feb-52)
- P. 1037 The Mouth Organ Swingers - "Hohner Boogie" / "Mouth Organ Boogie" (Mar-52)
- P. 1038 Sue Carson with the Harold Smart Trio - "Honey, You Can't Love Two" / "The Nickelodeon Rag" (Feb-52)
- P. 1039 Jimmy Young - "We Won't Live in a Castle" / "Roulette" (Mar-52)
- P. 1040 Ray Martin and his Concert Orchestra - "At Last! At Last!" / "Dancing Bells" (Apr-52)
- P. 1041 Jimmy Young - "Kiss Of Fire" / "Faith" (May-52)
- P. 1042 Jimmy Young - "Be Anything (But Be Mine)" / "Love, Where Are You Now" (May-52)
- P. 1043 Petula Clark - "The Card" / "It Had to Be You" (May-52)
- P. 1044 Annette Klooger - "Baby You're Wrong" / "So Madly in Love" (Sep-52)
- P. 1045 Dennis Lotis - "Here in My Heart" / "Take My Heart" (Sep-52)
- P. 1046 Slim and the Boys - "Meet Mister Callaghan" / "Blarney" (Sep-52)
- P. 1047 Jimmy Young - "Forgive and Forget" / "I Thought of You Last Night" (Sep-52)
- P. 1048 Petula Clark - "A Boy in Love" / "Fly Away Peter, Fly Away Paul" (Oct-52)
- P. 1049 Annette Klooger - "Botch-a-Me (Ba-Ba-Baciami Piccina)" / "Start Singing a Song" (Sep-52)
- P. 1050 The Browne Brothers - "Lonely Hearts" / "Farewell Merry Friends" (Oct-52)
- P. 1051 Monty Norman with Frank Chacksfield and his Orchestra - "Melody" / "You Belong to Me" (Oct-52)
- P. 1052 Jimmy Young - "Mademoiselle" / "My Shining Hour" (Nov-52)
- P. 1053 Monty Norman with Frank Chacksfield and his Orchestra - "Takes Two to Tango" / "The Valley of the Roses" (Nov-52)
- P. 1054 Lew Bart with Joseph Kun's Music - "Two-Faced Clock" / "I'll Never Know" (Nov-52)
- P. 1055 Smokey Knight - "I Can't Believe That You're Gone" / "Too Many Cigarettes" (Nov-52)
- P. 1056 Petula Clark - "Where Did My Snowman Go?" / "Anytime Is Teatime Now" (Dec-52)
- P. 1057 Petula Clark - "Made in Heaven" / "Temptation Rag" (Jan-53)
- P. 1058 Bernie Lewis - "Blarney" / "Molly McCarthy And Mary Malone" (Jan-53)
- P. 1059 Robin Richmond - "Ecstacy" / "Young and Healthy" (Jan-53)
- P. 1060 Dolores Ventura - "Hai-Hai-Hai" / "Llamada" (Jan-53)
- P. 1061 Ron Goodwin and his Orchestra - "Heykens' Serenade No.1" / "Wedding of the Rose" (Jan-53)
- P. 1062 Reggie Goff - "Moon Above Malaya" / "Just a Souvenir" (Jan-53)
- P. 1063 Petula Clark - "My Love is a Wanderer" / "Take Care of Yourself" (Jan-53)
- P. 1064 Derrick Francis - "Just Remember Me" / "I'd Love to Fall Asleep and Wake Up in Your Arms" (Mar-53)
- P. 1065 Robin Richmond - "Buffoon" / "That Naughty Waltz" (Mar-53)
- P. 1066 Ron Goodwin - "Rainbow Run" / "Jolly Brothers" (Mar-53)
- P. 1067 Dolores Ventura - "Rag of Rags" / "Calico Rag" (Apr-53)
- P. 1068 Dorothy Squires - "I'm Walking Behind You" / "Is There Any Room in Your Heart" (Apr-53)
- P. 1069 Monty Norman and the Coronets - "Cuban Love Song" / "Sleepless Nights" (May-53)
- P. 1070 The Harmonics - "Let's All Be Good Elizabethans" / "You've Done Something to My Heart" (May-53)
- P. 1071 Eric Winstone and his Orchestra - "Frustration" / "Anticipation" (May-53)
- P. 1072 Petula Clark - "Christopher Robin at Buckingham Palace" / "Three Little Kittens" (Jun-53)
- P. 1073 Jan Rosol - "Ni Toi, Ni Moi" / "Down The Road to Monterey" (Jul-53)
- P. 1074 Reggie Goff - "The Bridge of Sighs" / "I'll Always Love You" (Jul-53)
- P. 1075 Mike McKenzie - "The Kissing Tree" / "Yours For the Asking" (Sep-53)
- P. 1076 Dorothy Squires - "From Your Lips to the Ears Of God" / "Sorrento and You" (Sep-53)
- P. 1077 Dorothy Squires - "If You Love Me" / "Things Go Wrong" (Nov-53)
- P. 1078 Dolores Ventura - "Piano Tuners Rag" / "Fluter's Samba" (Oct-53)
- P. 1079 Dorothy Squires - "It's the Talk of the Town" / "Lost and Found" (Oct-53)
- P. 1080 The Wondertones - "Mystery Street" / "No Escape" (Nov-53)
- P. 1081 Radio Revellers - "Breaker of Hearts" / "Don't Ever Say" (Nov-53)
- P. 1082 Petula Clark - "Poppa Piccolino" / "The Who-Is-It Song" (Nov-53)
- P. 1083 Pierre Dorsey and Orchestra - "Carnavalito" / "The Girl From London" (Nov-53)
- P. 1084 Eric Winstone and his Orchestra / Laurie Johnson and his Orchestra - "Cat Walk" / "Slow Train Blues" (Nov-53)
- P. 1085 Jimmy Young - "Peace of Mind" / "West Wind" (Nov-53)
- P. 1086 The Oscar Rabin Band with Mel Gaynor - "Crazy Man Crazy" / "Forgive Me" (Nov-53)
- P. 1087 Reggie Goff - "Answer Me" / "Rags to Riches" (Nov-53)
- P. 1088 Eva Bartok - "Kiss Me" / "Don't Touch Me" (Nov-53)
- P. 1089 Primo Scala and his Accordion Band - "Six-Hit Medley (Parts 1 and 2): Swedish Rhapsody / Answer Me / Rags to Riches / I Saw Mommy Kissing Santa Claus / When You Hear Big Ben / Poppa Piccolino" (Nov-53)
- P. 1090 Radio Revellers - "Istanbul (Not Constantinople)" / "If You've Never Been in Love" (Dec-53)
- P. 1091 Robin Richmond - "The Creep" / "Park Plaza" (Dec-53)
- P. 1092 Radio Revellers - "Oh! My Pa-Pa" / "Don't Ever Leave Me" (Jan-54)
- P. 1093 Robin Richmond - "The Velvet Glove" / "Windmill Waltz" (Jan-54)
- P. 1094 Eric Winstone and his Orchestra - "Cobblers Song" / "Robbers March" (Jan-54)
- P. 1095 Lou Preager and his Orchestra - "Madonna" / "The Door, Senor" (Jan-54)
- P. 1096 Dorothy Squires - "Romany Violin" / "Changing Partners" (Feb-54)
- P. 1097 Malcom Lockyer and his Orchestra - "Pizzicato Rag" / "Fiddler's Boogie" (Feb-54)
- P. 1098 Colin Prince - "You're On Trial" / "Angelina" (Feb-54)
- P. 1099 Michael Fredericks and his Orchestra - "Ditto" / "Petite Ballerina" (Feb-54)
- P. 1100 Primo Scala and his Accordion Band - "Six-Hit Medley No. 2 (Parts 1 and 2): Oh My Pa-Pa / Changing Partners / You, You, You / The Velvet Glove / If You Love Me / Golden Tango" (Feb-54)
- P. 1101 Primo Scala and his Accordion Band - "Music Box Tango" / "Lazy Whistler" (Feb-54)
- P. 1102 Geoff Love and his Orchestra - "Desire" / "Episode" (Feb-54)
- P. 1103 Johnny Brandon with the Phantoms - "Dreamer's Highway" / "Heartless" (Mar-54)
- P. 1104 Roy Edwards - "From the Vine Came The Grape" / "I Need" (Mar-54)
- P. 1105 The Winter Trio - '"Front Page Story' Theme" / "So Lonely" (Mar-54)
- P. 1106 Lou Preager and his Orchestra (The Ragpickers) - "I See The Moon" / "Pi-Anna Rag" (Mar-54)
- P. 1107 Radio Revellers - "Bell Bottom Blues" / "An Armful Of Love" (Mar-54)
- P. 1108 Lou Preager and his Orchestra (*with Paul Rich) - "Egon Tango" / "I'll Follow You"* (Mar-54)
- P. 1109 Reggie Goff with the Velvetones and his Sextet - "Marry Her While You're Young" / "Love Me" (Mar-54)
- P. 1110 Bob Carroll - "There Is Danger" / "Be True To Me" (Apr-54)
- P. 1111 Johnny Brandon - "Sing Me Something Soft and Sentimental" / "Merci Beaucoup" (May-54)
- P. 1112 The Trio (Max Jaffa, Jack Byfield and Reginald Kilbey) - "Dance of the Angels" / "Moon Through the Trees" (Apr-54)
- P. 1113 Clark Dennis - "Granada" / "My Love For You" (Apr-54)
- P. 1114 Anthony Steel and the Radio Revellers - "West of Zanzibar (Jambo)" / "Who Cares" (Apr-54)
- P. 1115 Joe Kerr and his Jokers - "Mutiny on the Bounty" / "Bread and Water" (Apr-54)
- P. 1116 Joe "Mr Piano" Henderson - "Sour Tinkle" / "Bye Bye Blues" (Apr-54)
- P. 1117 Petula Clark - "The Little Shoemaker" / "Helpless" (Apr-54)
- P. 1118 The Mulcays - "My Happiness" / "Near You" (Jun-54)
- P. 1119 Marco Polo - "Have a Heart" / "Disappointed" (Jun-54)
- P. 1120 The Melody Three with Primo Scala and his Band - "Canoodlin' Rag" / "The Man With the Banjo" (Jun-54)
- P. 1121 Petula Clark "Meet Me in Battersea Park" / "A Long Way to Go" (Jun-54)
- P. 1122 Radio Revellers - "Monkeys Of Gibraltar" / "Roll Me Home" (Jul-54)
- P. 1123 Genie Conrad - "Joey" / "Everyone is Saying" (Jul-54)
- P. 1124 Elly Williams - "Ah-Dee-Dong" / "Worry, Worry, Worry" (Jul-54)
- P. 1125 Robin Richmond - "Valse Grise (The Grey Waltz)" / "Hysterics Rag" (Jul-54)
- P. 1126 Jan Rosol - "The Story of Tina" / "Chez Moi" (Jul-54)
- P. 1127 Inia Te Wiata - "Christening Chant" / "Choral Dance" (Jul-54)
- P. 1128 Petula Clark - "Smile" / "Somebody" (Jul-54)
- P. 1129 Joe "Mr Piano" Henderson - "Smile" / "Jangle-Box Rag" (Jul-54)
- P. 1130 Bill O'Connor - "To Be Your Love" / "The Words That I Whisper" (Sep-54)
- P. 1131 Johnny Brandon with the Phantoms - "Tomorrow" / "High as a Mountain" (Sep-54)
- P. 1132 Betty Garrett - "Go" / "(I Gotta Do) Soft Shoe" (Sep-54)
- P. 1133 Jerry Wallace - "Dixieanna" / "Runnin' After Love" (Sep-54)
- P. 1134 Danny Capri - "You're So Simpatico" / "Mama Nicolini" (Sep-54)
- P. 1135 Petula Clark - "Christmas Cards" / "Little Johnny Rainbow" (Oct-54)
- P. 1136 Jan Rosol (*and Gwen Campbell) - "I Love Paris"* / "C'est Magnifique" (Oct-54)
- P. 1137 Laurie Johnson - "Hallelujah" / "Many Dreams Ago" (Oct-54)
- P. 1138 Janet Gordon / Billy Reid and his Orchestra - "Cross Of Gold" / "Peppito" (Oct-54)
- P. 1139 Bernard Monshin and his Concert Orchestra - "Blue Sapphire" / "Tinkle-Box Samba" (Oct-54)
- P. 1140 Roy Edwards - "Midnight" / "Romeo And Juliet Waltz" (Nov-54)
- P. 1141 Radio Revellers with Dr. Barnardo's Children - "There'll Always Be a Christmas" / "Mrs. Santa Claus" (Nov-54)
- P. 1142 Johnny Brandon - "2-4-6-8" / "Warning" (Nov-54)
- P. 1143 Laurie Johnson and his Orchestra - "Pick Yourself Up" / "Frenchman's Creek" (Nov-54)
- P. 1144 Chris Dane - "Love You Didn't Do Right By Me" / "Stella By Starlight" (Nov-54)
- P. 1145 Bernard Monshin and his Concert Orchestra - "Tango Bolero" / "The Last Tango" (Jan-55)
- P. 1146 Petula Clark - "Majorca" / "Fascinating Rhythm" (Jan-55)
- P. 1147 Monty Kelly and his Orchestra - "Majorca" / "Neapolitan Nights" (Jan-55)
- P. 1148 Chris Dane - "Love Me Now" / "A Love Like Ours" (Jan-55)
- P. 1149 Dorothy Squires and the Radio Revellers - "White Wings" / "With All My Heart" (Jan-55)
- P. 1150 The Harry Arnold Orchestra - "Desiree" / "Blue Mirage" (Jan-55)
- P. 1151 Johnny O'Connor - "A Blossom Fell" / "Give Me the Right" (Jan-55)
- P. 1152 Don Carlos and his Orchestra - "The Hotchy-Witchy" / "Three Cuban Mice" (Feb-55)
- P. 1153 Eric Winstone and his Orchestra - "Fanfare Boogie" / "Slow Joe" (Feb-55)
- P. 1154 Anthony Steel and the Radio Revellers / The Radio Revellers - "The Flame" / "Under the Southern Cross" (Feb-55)
- P. 1155 Bethe Douglas - "Take it From Me / I'm So Right Tonight" (Feb-55)
- P. 1156 Billy McCormack - "I Went To My Mother" / "Unsuspecting Heart" (Mar-55)
- P. 1157 Joe "Mr Piano" Henderson / Laurie Johnson and his Orchestra - "First Theme" / "Out of the Clouds" (Mar-55)
- P. 1158 Tony Osborne and his Orchestra with Gerry Gray and Gwen Campbell - "Stranger in Paradise" / "Baubles, Bangles and Beads" (Apr-55)
- P. 1159 Kenny Baker (flugelhorn) with Laurie Johnson and his Orchestra - "Mama" / "Love is Here To Stay" (Apr-55)
- P. 1160 Harriot and Evans - "Keep Laughing in the Sunshine" / "Jamaica" (Mar-55)
- P. 1161 The Dinning Sisters - "Goofus" / "Mama (He Treats Your Daughter Mean)" (Apr-55)
- P. 1162 Dorothy Squires and the Radio Revellers - "When I Grow Too Old to Dream" / "Blue, Blue, Blue" (Apr-55)
- P. 1163 Johnny Brandon - "Don't Worry" / "Strike it Lucky" (May-55)
- P. 1164 Petula Clark - "Romance in Rome" / "Chee Chee Oo Chee" (May-55)
- P. 1165 Radio Revellers - "Boomerang" / "My Helpless Heart" (May-55)
- P. 1166 Laurie Johnson and his Orchestra (*Phil Seamen on drums) - "Drum Crazy"* / "Jamboree" (May-55)
- P. 1167 Joe "Mr Piano" Henderson - "Sing It With Joe: Parts 1 And 2" (May-55)
- P. 1168 Kathie Kay with Laurie Johnson and his Orchestra - "All My Life" / "I'll Be There" (May-55)
- P. 1169 Petula Clark (* with Joe "Mr Piano" Henderson) - "Crazy Otto Rag"* / "The Pendulum Song" (Jun-55)
- P. 1170 Jackie Bond (sax) and his Orchestra - "Evermore" / "Goodnight Waltz" (Jun-55)
- P. 1171 The Johnny Gregory Orchestra - "The Watermill" / "Elaine" (Jun-55)
- P. 1172 Robin Richmond at the Hammond Organ - "Theme From the Film 'Time of His Life'" / "Crinoline Waltz" (Jun-55)
- P. 1173 Eric Winstone and his Orchestra - "Opus One Mambo" / "Rhythm and Blues" (Jun-55)
- P. 1174 Johnny Brandon - "Anyone Can Be a Millionaire" / "Love and Kisses" (Jul-55)
- P. 1175 Eric Winstone and his Orchestra (*Stan Roderick on trumpet) - "Heartbreak"* / "Deep Sleep" (Jul-55)
- P. 1176 Billy McCormack with Laurie Johnson and his Orchestra - "For As Long As I Live" / "Stars Shine in Your Eyes" (Jul-55)
- P. 1177 Don Carlos and his Orchestra (*Al Winnet on trumpet) - "Why Do I (Theme From 'Am I A Camera'"*) / "Now Or Never" (Aug-55)
- P. 1178 Laurie Johnson and his Orchestra - "Song of the Pearlfishers" / "Letter to Virginia" (Aug-55)
- P. 1179 Petula Clark - "How Are Things With You" / "Tuna Puna Trinidad" (Aug-55)
- P. 1180 Julian Patrick with Don Costa and his Orchestra - "Give a Fool a Chance" / "A Woman's Love is Never Done" (Aug-55)
- P. 1181 UNISSUED
- P. 1182 Jackie Bond (sax) and his Orchestra - "Today and Every Day" / "The Bridge of Love" (Aug-55)
- P. 1183 Tom Stribling with the Johnny Gregory Orchestra - "Until You're Mine" / "Walk With Me Forever" (Aug-55)
- P. 1184 Joe "Mr Piano" Henderson and his Friends - "Sing It Again With Joe: Parts 1 and 2" (Aug-55)
- P. 1185 Lois Winter - "The Breeze and I" / "Malaguena" (Sep-55)
- P. 1186 Diane Cilento / Laurie Johnson and his Orchestra - "A Fool and His Heart" / "The 'Lily Watkins' Tune" (Sep-55)
- P. 1187 Johnny Brandon with the Norman Warren Orchestra and Chorus - "Home" / "I'm Burning My Bridges Behind Me" (Oct-55)
- P. 1188 Mae Williams with Orchestra conducted by Van Alexander - "I Went to the Village" / "Break Through" (Oct-55)
- P. 1189 The Johnny Gregory Orchestra - "Tango Capriccioso" / "The Forget-Me-Not Waltz" (UNISSUED)
- P. 1190 Robin Richmond at the Hammond Organ - "Organ-ising the Blues" / "Some Like it Hot" (Oct-55)

== See also ==
- Polygon Records
- Alan A. Freeman
