= Alan A. Freeman =

British record producer (1920–1985)

- Born: Alan Albert Freeman; 27 September 1920; St. John's Wood, London, England
- Died: 15 March 1985 (aged 64) Carshalton, London, England
- Genres: Pop music
- Occupations: Record producer, A&R executive
- Years active: 1940s – 1980s
- Labels: Polygon, Pye Nixa, Pye

Alan Albert Freeman, known professionally as Alan A. Freeman (27 September 1920 – 15 March 1985) was an English record producer who worked with Petula Clark, Max Miller, Tony Hancock, Nöel Coward, Morecambe and Wise, Sammy Davis Jr., Frank Sinatra, and Lonnie Donegan, producing UK singles chart number 1 hits by Donegan. Freeman founded the independent Polygon label, which ran from 1950 to 1955, and continued to work for its successor companies, Pye Nixa and Pye, in the 1960s and 70s. He achieved fame as a panellist on the ITV talent show New Faces in the 1970s, and his production career on various other labels lasted into the 1980s.

== Early life ==
Freeman was born in St. John's Wood, north west London, in September 1920, to Aileen (née Marks) and Australian-born Leslie Freeman.

== Career ==
By his late teens, Freeman was working as a clerk for a music publisher. His ambition had always been to have a record label and make his own records with it. In 1949, he was working for the Ed Kassner music publishing company as a song plugger, when he inherited some money, and began to go ahead with his project. His friend, pianist Joe Henderson, knew the singer and actress Petula Clark, whose father Leslie was keen to launch her as a recording artist. Henderson introduced Alan to Leslie Clark, who invested some money of his own (or Petula's) in the new label.

The label, Polygon Records, was a brave attempt by Freeman to gain a footing in the British record market, at a time when it was dominated by Decca and EMI (His Master's Voice, Columbia and Parlophone). The earliest recordings were actually made for the Australian market, as Freeman had a contact there, and he wanted to test the water. By 1950, Polygon was active, and during its lifetime, over 180 78 rpm records were released over five years, all of them produced by Freeman, including over 50 titles by Clark. Others who recorded for Polygon included Jimmy Young, Ray Martin, Frank Chacksfield, Robin Richmond, Dennis Lotis, Monty Norman, Ron Goodwin, Eric Winstone, Oscar Rabin, Primo Scala, Lou Preager and Joe "Mr Piano" Henderson.

By 1955, the label had been a small success, achieving several chart hits, the biggest of which was "The Little Shoemaker" by Clark, reaching No. 7. Other artists who had hits on Polygon were Henderson, Dorothy Squires, Johnny Brandon and Anthony Steel (the latter with The Radio Revellers). Freeman was approached by New Zealand businessman Hilton Nixon, who had a similar dream to his own. Hilton wanted to establish Nixa Records, but had run into problems with distribution. Thus Polygon was swallowed up by Nixa and became Pye Nixa Records.

Freeman continued to produce records, but shared responsibilities with several others. He produced "Gamblin' Man", "Puttin' on the Style" and "My Old Man's a Dustman", which were number 1 hits recorded by the skiffle performer Lonnie Donegan (the first two titles being issued on the same single release). By 1959, the company had dropped the 'Nixa' part and evolved into simply Pye Records. Clark was still recording for Pye, but with little success. Freeman found a song that was to relaunch her British career. The song was "Sailor", written by David West, a pseudonym for Norman Newell. It reached number 1 in February 1961. Freeman was Clark's producer from 1950 until 1963, when his role was taken over by Tony Hatch.

Freeman also produced recordings of London performances by Marlene Dietrich, and records featuring British comedian Tony Hancock; the latter's re-enactments of "The Blood Donor" and "The Radio Ham" for an LP was a best seller in 1961. The following year, Freeman produced Frank Sinatra's only studio album to be recorded outside America, Sinatra Sings Great Songs From Great Britain. For Sammy Davis Jr., Freeman produced the albums Sammy Davis Jr. Salutes the Stars of the London Palladium (1964) and Sammy Davis Jr. Sings the Complete "Dr. Dolittle" (1967). In 1968, Freeman moved to Australia, where he freelanced.

Having already taken part in the 1960s television programme Thank Your Lucky Stars, Freeman became a frequent panellist on ATV's 1970s Saturday night talent programme, New Faces, which brought him wider public recognition.

Freeman continued producing for various labels into the 1980s. His last production credit was on a single by comedian Tom O'Connor in 1984.

== Personal life and death ==
Freeman lived on Cromwell Road in South Kensington, south west London, from the 1940s to the 1960s. He subsequently lived in Park West, part of the Hyde Park Estate. After moving to Australia in the late 1960s, he lived in Willoughby, near Sydney.

Freeman married Shirley Bennett on 22 October 1968, and the couple had two children. They were divorced on 1 January 1985.

He died while trying to start a car at his ex-wife's home in Carshalton, Sutton, Greater London, on 15 March 1985, at the age of 64. He was survived by his sister, Patricia, and children, Amanda and Scott.
