= Polygon Records =

Defunct British record label (1950–1955)

Polygon Records was a British independent record label which ran from 1950 to 1955.

== History ==
The label was started in 1949 as the Polygon Record Company Ltd. by Alan A. Freeman and Leslie Clark, who was anxious to control distribution of his daughter Petula Clark's recordings. (Those associated with it fondly referred to the company as "Dead Parrot Records".) The two opened offices on Grosvenor Place in the Sloane Square section of London, and arranged Clark's first recording session with Ron Goodwin and his orchestra and a vocal backing group called the Stargazers. Since Polygon's UK distribution was not yet in existence, the first 78 rpm single – "You Go to My Head", backed with "Out of a Clear Blue Sky" – was released in Australia, followed by a cover of Teresa Brewer's "Music! Music! Music!" backed with "Blossoms on the Bough", both on the Esquire label.

In fact, the first Polygon release in the UK was not by Clark, but by Louis Prima and his orchestra. Clark's first official Polygon release was "You Are My True Love" / "You're the Sweetest in the Land" in 1950. Her first big hit came in June 1954 with "The Little Shoemaker" (Polygon P1117). In all, she recorded more than fifty songs for the label, including a few duets with its other major artist, Jimmy Young, then best known as a singer. Young recorded his big hit "Too Young" for the Polygon label (P1013) in 1951, prior to the launch of the UK singles chart, which started in November 1952.

Other artists who had chart hits on Polygon were Joe "Mr Piano" Henderson, Dorothy Squires, Johnny Brandon and Anthony Steel (the latter with The Radio Revellers).

Near the end of 1955, Polygon was sold to Nixa Records, then part of Pye Records, which led to the establishment of Pye Nixa Records. Nixa utilized a selection of Clark's Polygon tapes to release her first LP, Petula Clark Sings.

Clark's complete Polygon catalogue is available on CD – originally re-issued as The Polygon Years, Volume One (1950–1952) and The Polygon Years, Volume Two (1952–1955). However, when Polygon was first merged with Nixa, one of the two Nissen huts used for storing the label's master tapes was demolished with the contents still inside. Thus, as a consequence, the only source for around half of Polygon's masters is original 78 rpm discs. The first CD reissues of these recordings therefore suffered from poor sound, which was not improved until 2007 on the compilation It Had to Be You – The Complete Early Singles.

== Notable artists ==
- Petula Clark
- Jimmy Young
- Dorothy Squires
- Ray Martin
- Frank Chacksfield
- Robin Richmond
- Dennis Lotis
- Monty Norman
- Ron Goodwin
- Eric Winstone
- Oscar Rabin
- Primo Scala
- Lou Preager
- Joe "Mr Piano" Henderson
- Max Wall
- Eva Bartok
- Geoff Love
- Anthony Steel
- Inia Te Wiata
- Laurie Johnson
- Billy Reid
- Kenny Baker
- Johnny Brandon
- Kathie Kay
- Diane Cilento

== See also ==
- Alan A. Freeman
- List of record labels
- Polygon Records discography
