= Jimmy Skidmore =

- Born: James Richard Skidmore; 8 February 1916; London, England
- Died: 22 August 1998 (aged 82) Welwyn Garden City, Hertfordshire, England
- Genres: Jazz
- Instrument: Tenor saxophone

James Richard Skidmore (8 February 1916 – 22 August 1998) was an English jazz tenor saxophonist. He was born in Manor Park, London and was the father of tenor and soprano saxophonist Alan Skidmore.

Perhaps best known for his work with George Shearing from 1950 to 1952, Jimmy Skidmore worked with a variety of other well-known jazz musicians, including Humphrey Lyttelton, Victor Feldman and Kenny Baker.

He celebrated his 80th birthday playing alongside his son. Two years later, Skidmore died in Welwyn Garden City, Hertfordshire, England, in August 1998, at the age of 82.

== Select discography ==
- Oh Monah w/ Nat Gonella (Philips)
- Kenny Baker and Jazz Today Unit (Polygon)
- Kenny Baker and Friends (Nixa)
- The Melody Maker's All-Stars (Nixa)

With Humphrey Lyttelton

- Humph Plays Standards (Bethlehem)
- Humphrey Lyttelton and His Band (London)
- Music in the Making (Vogue)
- Jazz Today Unit (Esquire)
- Jazz Showcase (Nixa)
