= Double Impact (1960 album) =

Studio album by Buddy Morrow
- Released: 1960
- Venues: Webster Hall, New York City
- Genres: Big band; pop; theme music
- Length: 28:26
- Label: RCA Victor
- Producer: Ethel Gabriel

Double Impact is the second LP of twelve musical themes from popular television programs of the late 1950s performed by the Buddy Morrow Orchestra.

== Origin and concept ==
The chart success of Buddy Morrow's Impact, released in June 1959, prompted the production a year later of a follow-on effort, dubbed Double Impact. The album reflected RCA Victor's continued efforts to meet popular demand for television program theme music.

Veteran RCA Victor producer Ethel Gabriel produced the album. The tracks were arranged by Ray Martin and were recorded at Webster Hall in New York City. The recording engineers were Bob Simpson and Ray Hall.

The liner notes to Double Impact declare that television program music "is no longer neglected. Television has become a fashionable showcase for the special talents of the composing and performing jazz musician." The album "covers a lot of ground," geographically and thematically. "Crime, violence and the sounds of the chase can be heard mirrored in the themes."

== Reception ==
In its April 4, 1960, issue, Billboard magazine listed Double Impact in its Showcase of New and Outstanding LP's, among releases with the greatest potential appeal to the record-buying public, in the opinion of the Billboard review panel.

Reviewer Bruce Eder observed that, compared to Morrow's earlier TV theme album, Double Impact has "perhaps a somewhat more cohesive selection of material, drawn primarily from detective and police shows of the period." Among them, "'Bourbon Street Beat', in particular, benefits from the treatment that it receives here, very close to the original TV recording but with enough of an emphasis on New Orleans jazz and R&B to make it seem heavier and more serious."

In April 1960, Double Impact reached a high of number 44 on The Cash Box list of best-selling stereo albums.

== Track listing ==
Track	Title	Composers	Length
1	"Men into Space"	David Rose	2:45
2	"Hawaiian Eye"	Mack David, Jerry Livingston	2:14
3	"Staccato's Theme"	Elmer Bernstein	2:57
4	"The Deputy	Jack Marshall	2:09
5	"Riverboat Theme"	Elmer Bernstein	2:15
6	"Bourbon Street Beat"	Mack David, Jerry Livingston	2:11
7	"Bonanza"	Ray Evans, Jay Livingston	2:06
8	"Twilight Zone"	Bernard Herrmann	2:35
9	"San Francisco Blues "	Jerry Goldsmith	2:17
10	"The Untouchables"	Nelson Riddle	2:08
11	"Markham"	S.J. Wilson	2:13
12	"International Detective"	Sidney Shaw, Leroy Holmes	2:36
