= A House Divided =

A House Divided may refer to:

== Film ==
- A House Divided (1913 film), a film by Alice Guy-Blaché
- A House Divided (1919 film), a 1919 American film by J. Stuart Blackton
- A House Divided (1931 film), a film by William Wyler
- A House Divided (television film), a 2000 film featuring Sean McCann
- A House Divided (TV documentary), a film nominated at the 2003 1st Irish Film & Television Awards
- A House Divided (2008 film), a film by Mitch Davis

== Gaming ==
- A House Divided (board game), a strategic wargame about the American Civil War
- A House Divided, an expansion pack for Victoria II
- "A House Divided", an episode of The Walking Dead: Season Two

== Television ==
- A House Divided (TV series), a 2019 drama series
- "A House Divided" (Dallas), an episode of Dallas
- "House Divided", an episode of House
- "A House Divided" (Person of Interest), an episode of Person of Interest
- "A House Divided" (Upstairs, Downstairs), an episode of Upstairs, Downstairs
- "A House Divided", an episode of Home Improvement
- "A House Divided", an episode of Jersey Shore

== Other uses ==
- A House Divided (novel), a 1935 novel by Pearl S. Buck
- "A House Divided" (song), a 1993 song by Rick Price

== See also ==
- Lincoln's House Divided Speech, a speech by Abraham Lincoln
- "Living in a House Divided", a 1972 song by Cher
- "A Milhouse Divided", an episode of The Simpsons
- Mark 3, a chapter in the Bible
