= Elgar Symphony No. 2 discography =

Edward Elgar's Symphony No 2 was first recorded complete in 1927 by His Master's Voice (later part of the EMI group) conducted by the composer. (Elgar had conducted a truncated version by the old acoustic process in 1924.) This recording was reissued on LP record and later on compact disc. There was no further recording for seventeen years, until Sir Adrian Boult made the first of his five recordings of the symphony in 1944. Since then there have been many more new recordings, the majority played by British orchestras with seven of them recorded by the London Philharmonic.

== Recordings by date ==
Conductor	Orchestra	Record company	Date
The composer	Royal Albert Hall Orchestra	His Master's Voice	1924
The composer	London Symphony Orchestra	EMI	1927
Sir Adrian Boult	BBC Symphony Orchestra	EMI	1944
Sir John Barbirolli	Hallé Orchestra	EMI	1954
Sir Adrian Boult	London Philharmonic Orchestra	Nixa	1956
Sir Adrian Boult	Scottish National Orchestra	Waverley	1963
Sir Malcolm Sargent	BBC Symphony Orchestra	BBC	1964 (live)
Sir John Barbirolli	Hallé Orchestra	EMI	1964
Sir John Barbirolli	Boston Symphony Orchestra	Music & Arts	1964 (live)
Sir Adrian Boult	London Philharmonic Orchestra	Lyrita	1968
Sir Georg Solti	London Philharmonic Orchestra	Decca	1972
Daniel Barenboim	London Philharmonic Orchestra	CBS	1973
Sir Adrian Boult	London Philharmonic Orchestra	EMI	1976
Sir Alexander Gibson	Scottish National Orchestra	RCA	1977
James Loughran	Hallé Orchestra	Enigma	1979
Yevgeny Svetlanov	USSR Symphony Orchestra	EMI	1979 (live)
Vernon Handley	London Philharmonic Orchestra	EMI (CFP label)	1980
Bernard Haitink	Philharmonia Orchestra	EMI	1984
Bryden Thomson	London Philharmonic Orchestra	Chandos	1986
Giuseppe Sinopoli	Philharmonia Orchestra	DG	1989
Leonard Slatkin	London Philharmonic Orchestra	RCA	1989
Yehudi Menuhin	Royal Philharmonic Orchestra	Virgin	1991
Jeffrey Tate	London Symphony Orchestra	EMI	1991
Andrew Davis	BBC Symphony Orchestra	Teldec	1992
André Previn	London Symphony Orchestra	Philips	1993
Sir Edward Downes	BBC Philharmonic	Naxos	1994
Sir Charles Mackerras	Royal Philharmonic Orchestra	Decca	1994
Sir Colin Davis	London Symphony Orchestra	LSO Live	2001 (live)
Sir Mark Elder	Hallé Orchestra	Hallé	July 2003
Richard Hickox	BBC National Orchestra of Wales	Chandos	2005
Owain Arwel Hughes	National Youth Orchestra of Wales	Divine Art	2006
Sir Andrew Davis	Philharmonia Orchestra	Signum	2007 (live)
Vladimir Ashkenazy	Sydney Symphony Orchestra	Exton	2008 (live)
Kirill Petrenko	Berliner Philharmoniker	Berliner Philharmoniker Digital Concert Hall	2009 (live: DVD via subscription)
Tadaaki Otaka	NHK Symphony Orchestra	King International	2009 (live)
Sakari Oramo	Royal Stockholm Philharmonic Orchestra	BIS	2013
Daniel Barenboim	Staatskapelle Berlin	Decca	2014 (live)
Vasily Petrenko	Royal Liverpool Philharmonic Orchestra	Onyx	2017
Edward Gardner	BBC Symphony Orchestra	Chandos	2018

== Critical opinion ==
BBC Radio 3's "Building a Library" feature has broadcast comparative reviews of all available recordings of the symphony on three occasions since the 1980s. The recommendations were as follows:

- 18 May 1985, reviewer, Robert Philip:
  - BBC Symphony Orchestra, Sir Adrian Boult
  - London Philharmonic Orchestra, Vernon Handley
- 8 April 1995, reviewer, Jerrold Northrop Moore:
  - London Symphony Orchestra, Sir Edward Elgar
  - London Philharmonic Orchestra, Sir Georg Solti
- 15 October 2005, reviewer, David Nice:
  - BBC Symphony Orchestra, Sir Adrian Boult
  - London Symphony Orchestra, Sir Colin Davis

The Penguin Guide to Recorded Classical Music, 2008, gave its maximum four star rating to the Decca recording by Solti and the London Philharmonic, coupled with the First Symphony, and the EMI recording by Handley with the same orchestra.

In September 2011, Gramophone in a comparative review of all recordings of the work recommended those by the composer, Thomson, Elder, and, as first choice, Boult (1968).
