= Nixa =

Nixa can refer to:

- Nixa, Missouri, suburb of Springfield, Missouri, USA
- Nixa Records, British record label founded in 1950
- Nicholas Alexandrovich, Tsesarevich of Russia (nickname)
- Nixa (writer), pseudonym of Nicanor de la Fuente Sifuentes (1902-2009), Peruvian writer
