= Romeo (Petula Clark song) =

1961 song by Petula Clark

Single by Petula Clark
- B-side: "You're Getting to Be a Habit with Me"
- Released: 1961
- Genre: Pop
- Label: Pye
- Composer: Robert Stolz
- Lyricist: Jimmy Kennedy
- Producer: Alan A. Freeman

"Romeo" is a 1961 pop song recorded by Petula Clark.

== History ==
Produced by Alan A. Freeman and featuring Big Jim Sullivan on guitar, "Romeo" was Clark's recording of a 1919 composition by Robert Stolz entitled "Salome" which had featured a German-language lyric by Arthur Rebner (de). The lyric for Clark's "Romeo" was newly written by Jimmy Kennedy: Arthur Rebner is sometimes afforded a songwriting credit for "Romeo".

The song peaked at No. 3 on the UK Singles Chart dated 26 August 1961. Despite peaking lower than her No. 1 UK comeback hit "Sailor", "Romeo" earned Clark her first Gold record by selling 400,000 units in the UK. In Ireland "Romeo" reached No. 2. Jean Broussolle who had translated Clark's precedent hit "Sailor" rendered "Romeo" as "Roméo" which became Clark's first No. 1 hit in France on 20 January 1962 – Clark's next two singles would also reach No. 1 in France where overall she'd top the charts five times. "Roméo" was also ranked at No. 1 on the chart for the Wallonia region of Belgium while the original English version had been a hit (#2) in Belgium's Flemish region.

"Romeo" also achieved hit status in Denmark (#3), the Netherlands (#10), Norway (#7) and Australia (#25).

== Cover versions ==
"Romeo"

- Rina Pia (nl) recorded a Dutch rendering of "Roméo" which reached No. 3 on Belgium's Dutch chart in the autumn of 1962.
- A Czech rendering of "Romeo" was recorded in 1963 by Yvetta Simonová (cs).

"Salome"

- An earlier English-language rendering of "Salome" by lyricist Bartley Costello entitled "Sal-o-may" had been published in 1920 but was evidently never recorded although instrumental versions of Stolz' piece were recorded under the title "Sal-o-may" by the Paul Biese Trio and also by the Joseph C. Smith Orchestra in 1921.
- A hit in Germany in the summer of 1961 via a recording by Lucas Quartett (de) (chart peak #20), the German-language original version of "Salome" has also been recorded by Medium-Terzett (de) (album Weit ist die Welt/ 1967), Harry Friedauer (album "Mit Musik Geht Alles Besser/ 1969), Heino (album La Montanara/ 1973), and Extrabreit (album Welch Ein Land! – Was Für Männeré/ 1981), while a Finnish rendering was recorded in 1961 by Kukonpojat (fi).
- An Italian version of Stolz's "Salome" entitled "Abat-jour", lyric by Ennio Neri, in late 1950s(?) and recorded by Nilo Ossani (it) and remade by Aurelio Fierro, reached No. 4 on the Italian hit parade in September 1962 to rank as the year's No. 9 hit via a remake by Henry Wright (it) which bested a rival version by Milva. The success of Wright's "Abat-jour", which was perceived as a local cover version of Clark's "Romeo" prompted the decision to have Clark herself cut songs for the Italian market.
  - Henry Wright's version of "Abat-jour" is prominently featured in the 1963 film Yesterday, Today and Tomorrow: Sophia Loren, playing the prostitute Mara, plays Wright's record as the background music for the strip tease she performs for a client played by Marcello Mastroianni. The 1994 film Prêt-à-Porter featured Loren and Mastroianni in what was in effect a remake of the strip tease scene from Yesterday, Today & Tomorrow with Wright's "Abat-jour" again played as background music.
- Kukonpojat (fi) recorded a version of "Salome" with Finnish lyrics in 1961.
