= Eric Arthur Tomlinson =

British recording engineer

- Born: 8 January 1931; Preston, Lancashire, England
- Died: 24 November 2015 (aged 84); Exeter, Devon, England
- Occupation: Audio engineer
- Known for: Motion picture soundtracks

Eric Arthur Tomlinson (8 January 1931 – 24 November 2015) was an English recording engineer, who recorded and mixed the scores to more than 120 movies.

He had an aeronautical engineering apprenticeshipship at Fairey Aviation, and served in the Royal Air Force. He then began doing small jobs for Radio Luxemburg, and later joined the International Broadcasting Company, where he recorded John Dankworth, Cleo Laine and Ted Heath among others.

At the end of the 1950s, he moved to cinematic recordings, first with Muir Mathieson. He joined Cine-Tele Sound (CTS) Studios in Bayswater in 1959, where some of his first projects were early James Bond films.

== Films (incomplete list) ==
- Dr. No (1962)
- Charade (1963)
- From Russia with Love (1963)
- A Shot in the Dark (1964)
- Goldfinger (1964)
- Zulu (1964)
- The Ipcress File (1965)
- Thunderball (1965)
- Born Free (1966)
- Ryan's Daughter (1970)
- Fiddler on the Roof (1971)
- Star Wars (1977)
- Superman (1978)
- Alien (1979)
- The Empire Strikes Back (1980)
- Raiders of the Lost Ark (1981)
- Return of the Jedi (1983)
- Amadeus (1984)
- Highlander (1986)
- RoboCop (1987)

== Music (incomplete list) ==
- Sinatra Sings Great Songs from Great Britain
- Goldfinger (Shirley Bassey song)
