= The Sound of Petula =

- Country of origin: United Kingdom

Original release
- Release: 17 December 1972 – 21 December 1974

The Sound of Petula is a musical variety series hosted by Petula Clark that aired on the BBC from 17 December 1972 through 21 December 1974.

Each episode had a theme and featured a guest star or two. Highlights included The French Connection with Sacha Distel, The Roaring Forties with the Pointer Sisters, His & Hers with Jack Jones, Off to the Movies with David Essex and Michael York, And All That Jazz with Oscar Peterson, and two Christmas specials, one with Anthony Newley, the other with Frankie Howerd.
