= Billy Noname =

- Music: Johnny Brandon
- Lyrics: Johnny Brandon
- Book: William Wellington Mackey
- Productions: 1970 Off-Broadway

Billy Noname is an Off-Broadway musical with music and lyrics by Johnny Brandon and a book by William Wellington Mackey. It ran for 48 performances at the Truck and Warehouse Theater, from March 2, 1970, to April 12, 1970. Lucia Victor directed, and the title role of Billy Noname was played by Donny Burks. The musical tells the story of a black man growing up. A recording of the original cast was released in 1996.

Roulette Records Label (New York) issued the musical soundtrack on record #SROC-11.
