= Patsy Smart =

British actress (1918–1996)

- Smart playing Miss Maude Roberts in Upstairs, Downstairs episode "A House Divided")
- Born: Patricia Doreen Smart; 14 August 1918; Chingford, Essex, England
- Died: February 6, 1996; Denville Hall, London, England
- Occupation: Actress
- Years active: 1954–1990
- Height: 5 ft 3 in (160 cm)
- Family: Ralph Smart (brother)

Patsy Smart (14 August 1918 – 6 February 1996) was an English actress, best remembered for her performance as Miss Roberts in the 1970s ITV television drama Upstairs, Downstairs.

She also appeared in: Danger Man, Only When I Laugh, Dixon of Dock Green, Z-Cars, The Prisoner, The Avengers, The Sweeney, Doctor Who (The Talons of Weng-Chiang), Sherlock Holmes and Doctor Watson (The Case of the Final Curtain), Blake's 7, Danger UXB, The Chinese Detective, Minder, Rentaghost, Terry and June, Farrington of the F.O., Casualty, Hallelujah!, and The Bill.

In her later roles, she was expert at playing dotty old ladies, her Mrs Sibley and Miss Dingle characters in Terry and June being examples. Another example was as the wife of the gardener in the Miss Marple episode "The Moving Finger" which starred Joan Hickson.

Her films included Sons and Lovers (1960), The Tell Tale Heart (1960), Return of a Stranger (1961), What Every Woman Wants (1962), Arthur? Arthur! (1969), Leo the Last (1970), The Raging Moon (1971), Great Expectations (1974), Exposé (1976), The Pink Panther Strikes Again (1976), Tess (1979), The Elephant Man (1980) and The Fourth Protocol (1987).

Patsy Smart died on 6 February 1996.

== Partial filmography ==
- The Flying Scot (1957) - Mother (uncredited)
- Sons and Lovers (1960) - Emma
- The Tell Tale Heart (1960) - Mrs. Marlow
- Return of a Stranger (1961) - Mrs. Rayner
- Design for Loving (1962) - Landlady
- What Every Woman Wants (1962) - Hilda
- Never Mention Murder - nurse
- Arthur? Arthur! (1969) - Miss Bonnamie
- Leo the Last (1970) - Mrs. Kowalski
- The Raging Moon (1971) - Bruce's Mother
- Steptoe and Son (1972) - Mrs. Hobbs
- O Lucky Man! (1973)
- Great Expectations (1974) - Mrs. Wopsle
- One of Our Dinosaurs Is Missing (1975) - Old Maid (uncredited)
- Exposé (1976) - Mrs. Aston
- The Bawdy Adventures of Tom Jones (1976) - Village Gossip (uncredited)
- The Pink Panther Strikes Again (1976) - Mrs. Japonica
- The Hound of the Baskervilles (1978) - Masseuse (uncredited)
- The Legacy (1978) - Cook
- Tess (1979) - Housekeeper
- The Wildcats of St. Trinian's (1980) - Miss Warmold
- The Elephant Man (1980) - Distraught Woman
- Electric Dreams (1984) - Lady in Ticket Line
- The Chain (1984) - Old Lady
- The Fourth Protocol (1987) - Preston's Housekeeper
