= What Every Woman Wants (1962 film) =

British comedy by Ernest Morris

- British quad poster
- Directed by: Ernest Morris
- Written by: Mark Grantham (original story) (as M. M. McCormick)
- Produced by: The Danzigers
- Starring: William Fox; Hy Hazell; Dennis Lotis
- Cinematography: James Wilson
- Edited by: John S. Smith
- Music by: Bill LeSage
- Production company: Danziger Productions
- Distributed by: United Artists Corporation (UK)
- Release date: 1962
- Running time: 69 minutes
- Country: United Kingdom
- Language: English

What Every Woman Wants is a 1962 British second feature ('B') comedy film directed by Ernest Morris and starring William Fox, Hy Hazell and Dennis Lotis. The screenplay by Mark Grantham (as M. M. McCormick) concerns a marriage guidance counsellor who struggles with his own domestic life.

== Plot ==
Married mother Jean Goodwin and her daughter Sue join forces to bring about a transformation in their husbands' behavior, hoping to receive more attention from them. Their intricate plan sets off a series of comedic mishaps and chaos.

== Cast ==
- William Fox as Philip Goodwin
- Hy Hazell as Jean Goodwin
- Dennis Lotis as Tom Yardley
- Elizabeth Shepherd as Sue Goodwin
- Guy Middleton as George Barker
- Andrew Faulds as Derek Chadwick
- Patsy Smart as Hilda
- Ian Fleming as Nelson
- George Merritt as Maxwell
- Brian Peck as barman
- Vi Stevens as Mrs Adams
- George Roderick as Adams
- John Breslin as John Shand
- Jack Melford as Doctor Falcon
