= Sinatra Sings Great Songs from Great Britain =

Sinatra Sings Great Songs From Great Britain

Studio album by Frank Sinatra
- Released: 1962
- Recorded: June 12–14, 1962, London
- Genres: Vocal jazz; traditional pop
- Length: 35:12 (original UK mono release)
- Labels: Reprise; R 1006 (mono LP), R9-1006 (stereo LP)
- Producer: Alan A. Freeman

Frank Sinatra chronology
Sinatra and Swingin' Brass (1962)	Sinatra Sings Great Songs From Great Britain (1962)	Sinatra–Basie: An Historic Musical First (1962)

Professional ratings
Review scores
Source	Rating
AllMusic	2.5/5 stars

Sinatra Sings Great Songs From Great Britain is the twenty-eighth studio album by American singer Frank Sinatra, released in 1962. It was released on LP in Great Britain, but not in the United States. A US release would not come until the compact disc released in the early 1990s. All tracks were available on The Complete Reprise Studio Recordings.

Arranged by Robert Farnon, the album was recorded in London in June 1962 at CTS Studios by Eric Tomlinson, a renowned recording and film industry dubbing engineer, who would go on to record the soundtracks to dozens of feature films, including Oliver! (1968), Fiddler on the Roof (1971), and the original Star Wars trilogy (1977; 1980; 1983). The album was produced by Alan A. Freeman.

It is Sinatra's only UK studio album, though there were three other radio performances that were recorded and later released.

Sinatra was tired after touring, and had a sore throat: he was apparently not very happy with his voice.

== Track listing ==
1. "The Very Thought of You" (Ray Noble) – 3:31
2. "We'll Gather Lilacs in the Spring" (Ivor Novello) – 3:11
3. "If I Had You" (Jimmy Campbell, Reginald Connelly, Ted Shapiro) – 4:05
4. "Now Is the Hour" (Maewa Kaihan, Clement Scott, Dorothy Stewart) – 2:48
5. "The Gypsy" (Billy Reid) – 3:18
6. "A Nightingale Sang in Berkeley Square" (Eric Maschwitz, Manning Sherwin) – 3:52
7. "A Garden in the Rain" (James Dyrenforth, Carroll Gibbons) – 3:22
8. "London by Night" (Carroll Coates) – 3:17
9. "We'll Meet Again" (Hughie Charles, Ross Parker) – 3:42
10. "I'll Follow My Secret Heart" (Noël Coward) – 3:16

Additional track not included on original release, first released in Japan on LP in 1985, and later on CD worldwide:

1. "Roses of Picardy" (Frederic E. Weatherly, Haydn Wood) – 3:01

== Personnel ==
- Frank Sinatra - Vocals
- Robert Farnon - Arranger, conductor

== Notes ==
Sinatra recorded the album, a collection of all British material, in June 1962, towards the end of a long tour raising money for children's charities that had started back in April, and included performances in Tokyo, Hong Kong, Tel Aviv, Rome, Athens and Milan. The only studio album he recorded outside of the United States, it was recorded at CTS Studios, at its original Bayswater location. Sinatra spent three nights there, working on the tracks for the recording.

Sinatra had made his first visit to the UK in the summer of 1950, when he topped the bill at the London Palladium, and enjoyed playing in Britain. When he toured the UK in 1953, at venues that ranged from the Tooting Granada to Blackpool Opera House, his star had been fading, but the time of this recording, he was a record label owner (Reprise), no longer recording for Capitol.
