= Buddy Morrow =

American trombonist and bandleader (1919–2010)

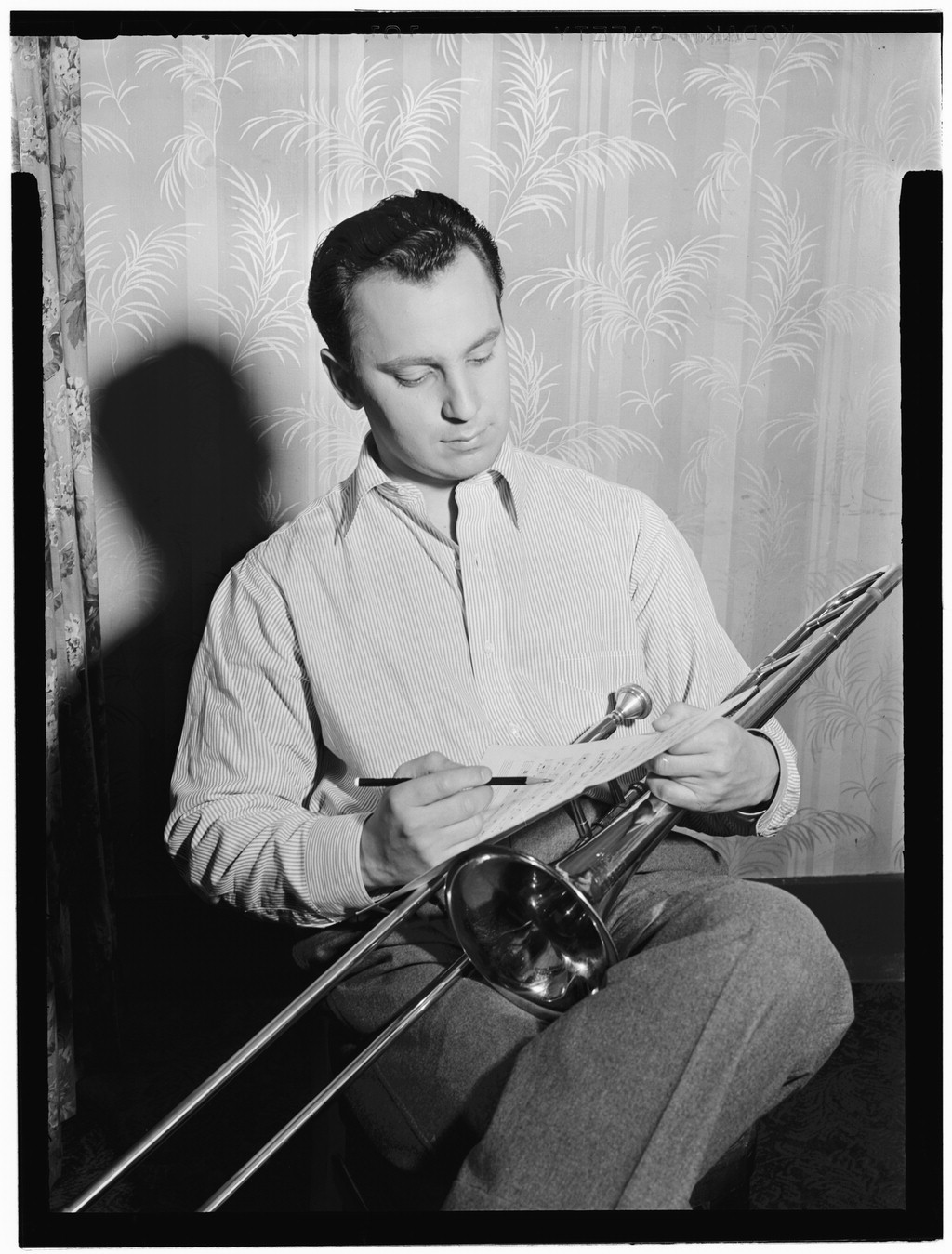
- Morrow, c. May 1947; Photograph by William P. Gottlieb

Background information
- Also known as: Moe Zudekoff
- Born: Muni Zudekoff; February 8, 1919; New Haven, Connecticut, U.S.
- Died: September 27, 2010 (aged 91) Maitland, Florida, U.S.
- Genres: Swing, R&B
- Occupations: Bandleader, musician, arranger, composer
- Instrument: Trombone
- Years active: 1933–2010
- Labels: RCA Victor, Mercury

Buddy Morrow (born Muni Zudekoff; February 8, 1919 – September 27, 2010), also known as Moe Zudekoff, was an American trombonist and bandleader.

== Career ==
On a scholarship at age 16, Morrow studied trombone with Ernest Horatio Clarke (1865–1947) at Juilliard from October to December 1936. During the next year he began playing trombone with Sharkey Bonano's Sharks of Rhythm, an Eddie Condon group. He then worked with Eddy Duchin, Vincent Lopez, and Artie Shaw. He became known as "Buddy Morrow" in 1938 when he joined the Tommy Dorsey band. In 1939 he performed with Paul Whiteman's Concert Orchestra for their recording of Gershwin's Concerto in F. In 1940, Morrow joined the Tony Pastor band, but this was only a short detour on his way to replacing Ray Conniff in the Bob Crosby band. Shortly thereafter, he joined the U.S. Navy, during which he recorded with Billy Butterfield, leading a ten-piece band with three trombones, accompanying Red McKenzie singing four arrangements, including "Sweet Lorraine" and "It's the Talk of the Town".

After demobilization, Morrow joined Jimmy Dorsey's band, then went into radio freelancing as a studio musician. He began conducting sessions, which introduced him to bandleading. RCA Victor sponsored him as director of his band in 1951. The band's first hit, "Night Train" by Jimmy Forrest, was a hit in rhythm and blues.

Morrow's early 1950s records such as "Rose, Rose, I Love You" and "Night Train" appeared on the Billboard magazine charts. "Night Train" reached No. 12 in the U.K. Singles Chart in March 1953. In 1959 and 1960 Morrow's Orchestra released two albums of American television theme songs, Impact and Double Impact. Morrow was a member of The Tonight Show Band.

Morrow led the Tommy Dorsey Orchestra from 1977 through September 24, 2010, when he appeared with the band for the final time. Morrow died on September 27, 2010. He was 91.

== Discography ==
- Re-enlistment Blues (?, 1953)
- Shall We Dance (Mercury, 1955)
- Golden Trombone (Mercury, 1956)
- Music for Dancing Feet (Wing, 1956)
- A Salute to the Fabulous Dorseys (Mercury, 1957)
- Tribute to a Sentimental Gentleman (Mercury, 1957)
- Night Train (RCA Victor, 1957)
- Dancing Tonight to Morrow (RCA Victor, 1958)
- Let's Have a Dance Party! (RCA Camden, 1958)
- Just We Two (Mercury, 1958)
- Impact (RCA Victor, 1959)
- Double Impact (RCA Victor, 1960)
- Poe For Moderns (RCA Victor, 1960)
- Night Train Goes to Hollywood (Mercury, 1962)
- New Blues Scene (United Artists, 1967)
- Revolving Bandstand (RCA Victor, 1974)
- Big Band Series.Original Recording (Picc-a-Dilly, 1980)
- The Complete RCA Victor Revolving Bandstand Sessions (RCA, 1993)
- Swing the Sinatra Way (Hindsight, 1998)

=== As sideman ===
With Count Basie

- High Voltage (MPS, 1970)
- Basie's Timing (MPS, 1972)

With the Free Design

- Kites Are Fun (Project 3 Total Sound, 1967)
- Stars/Time/Bubbles/Love (Project 3 Total Sound, 1970)

With Jackie Gleason

- Tis the Season (Capitol, 1967)
- A Taste of Brass for Lovers Only (Capitol, 1967)

With Urbie Green

- 21 Trombones (Project 3 Total Sound, 1967)
- 21 Trombones Rock/Blues/Jazz Volume Two (Project 3 Total Sound, 1969)
- Urbie Green's Big Beautiful Band (Project 3 Total Sound, 1974)

With Enoch Light

- Volume II (Project 3 Total Sound, 1969)
- Big Hits of the 20's (Project 3 Total Sound, 1971)
- The Big Band Sound of the Thirties (Project 3 Total Sound, 1971)
- Big Band Hits of the 30's & 40's (Project 3 Total Sound, 1971)
- 1973 (Project 3 Total Sound, 1972)
- The Big Band Hits of the 40s & 50s (Project 3 Total Sound, 1973)

With Flip Phillips

- Flip Phillips Collates (Clef, 1952)
- Flip (Verve, 1961)

With Lee Wiley

- Back Home Again (Monmouth Evergreen, 1971)
- I've Got the World On a String (Ember, 1972)

With others

- Gato Barbieri, Chapter Three: Viva Emiliano Zapata (Impulse!, 1974)
- Bob Crosby, South Rampart Street Parade (Decca, 1992)
- Marty Gold, Suddenly It's Springtime (RCA Victor, 1964)
- Barry Manilow, Singin' with the Big Bands (Arista, 1994)
- Galt MacDermot, Dude (Kilmarnock, 1973)
- Van McCoy, The Disco Kid (Avco, 1975)
- Moondog, Moondog (Columbia Masterworks, 1969)
- David "Fathead" Newman, Mr. Fathead (Warner Bros., 1976)
- David Ruffin, Everything's Coming Up Love (Motown, 1976)
- Artie Shaw, Rhythm Makers (Magic 1987)
- Joe Thomas, Masada (Groove Merchant, 1975)
- Sarah Vaughan, Summertime (CBS, 1984)
- Bob Wilber & Maxine Sullivan, The Music of Hoagy Carmichael (Audiophile, 1993)
