= Joe "Mr Piano" Henderson =

Scottish pianist (1920–1980)

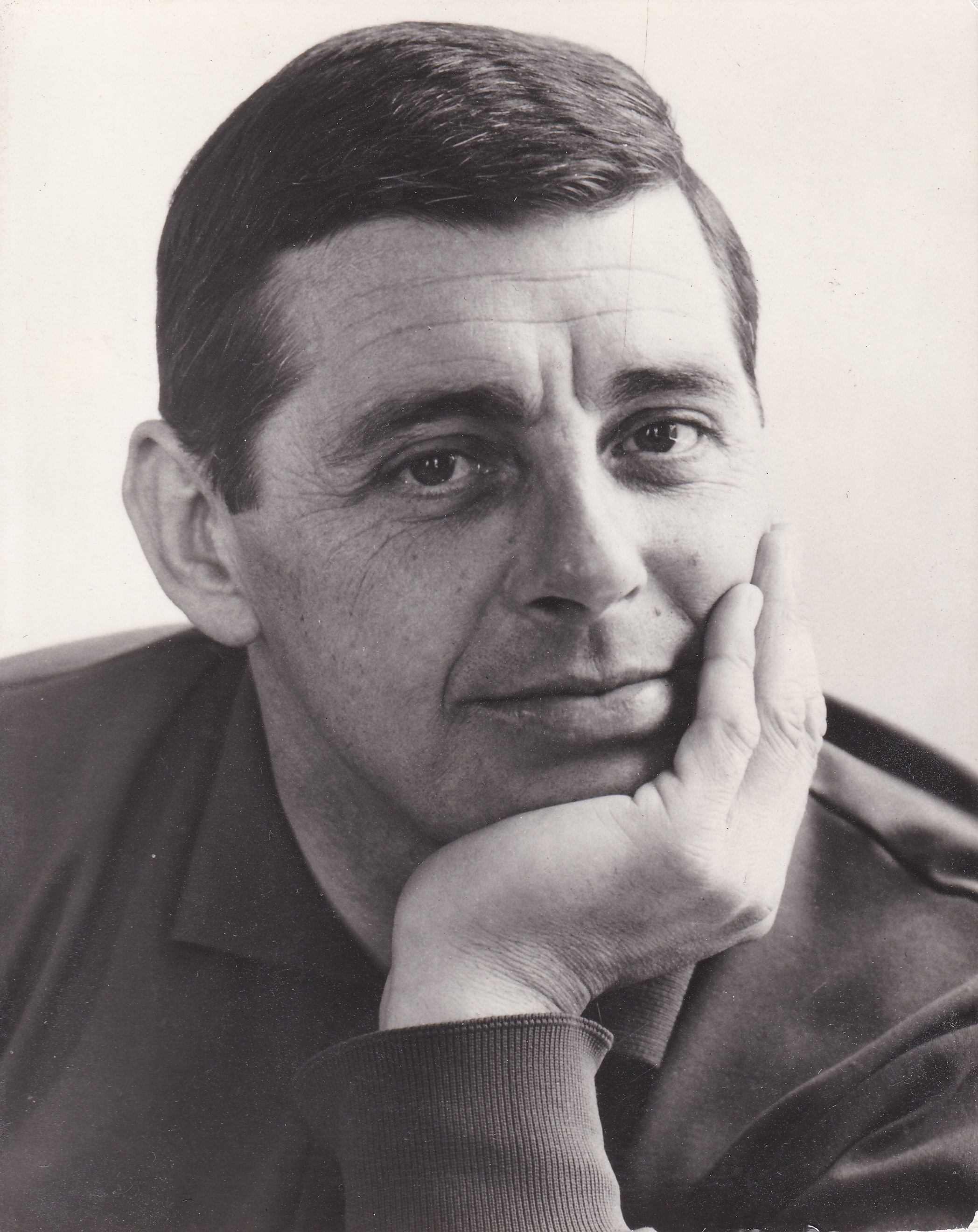
- Publicity shot (1970)
- Born: Joseph Turner Henderson; 2 May 1920; Glasgow, Scotland
- Died: 4 May 1980 (aged 60); London, England
- Occupations: Pianist; composer; entertainer
- Years active: 1935–1980
- Spouses: Janet Brunell (m. 1961); Joyce Greenaway (m. 1978)
- Musical career
- Genres: Easy listening, British dance band, traditional pop
- Labels: Polygon; Pye; Parlophone; Pye Golden Guinea; Marble Arch; Polydor; Mercury; Fontana; Columbia; Spark

Joseph Turner Henderson (2 May 1920 – 4 May 1980), known as Joe "Mr Piano" Henderson, was a Scottish pianist, composer and recording artist who became well-known in Britain in the 1950s, with his entertainment career continuing into the 1960s and 1970s.

== Early life ==
Henderson was born in Glasgow, Scotland, and taught to play the piano by his classically-trained mother. He formed his own band to perform at school dances and became a professional musician aged 13. He left the family home in Kirkcaldy at the age of 15, and played in dance bands.

== Career ==
After World War II, Henderson began working for the Peter Maurice publishing company. It was there that he met the singer Petula Clark in 1947. In 1949, Henderson introduced Clark to Alan A. Freeman, who, together with her father Leslie, formed the Polygon record label, for which she recorded her earliest hits. Clark and Henderson later had a romantic relationship, which is said to have broken up because he did not want to be "Mr Petula Clark".

In the 1950s, Henderson was a regular on Britain's "Tin Pan Alley", the nickname given to the music industry based in Denmark Street, Soho, London. He can be seen in the 1951 Pathé short film Tin Pan Alley, accompanying Clark.

She suggested that Henderson be allowed to record his own music, and in 1955, he enjoyed two top twenty UK singles chart hits on Polygon, "Sing It With Joe" and "Sing It Again With Joe", both medleys of vintage popular songs.

Henderson wrote the incidental music and several songs for three British films that featured Clark: Made In Heaven (1952), The Gay Dog (1954) and The Happiness of Three Women (1954). He can be seen playing a medley of film songs in a clip from an episode of the 1956 television show Fanfare.

In 1957, George Hamilton IV scored a hit with Henderson and Jack Fishman's composition "Why Don't They Understand", a song they wrote about Henderson's relationship with Clark. She later went on to record the song, with it being released in 1965. Other artists who have recorded it include Cliff Richard (1965), Patty Duke (1966), Frankie Avalon (1969), Bobby Vinton (1970) and The Williams Brothers (2002).

Henderson later penned "There's Nothing More To Say" about the split with Clark, which she subsequently recorded as an album track. In 1994, a previously unreleased 14-minute medley of Clark singing while accompanied by Henderson, recorded circa 1958, was found in the Pye Records vaults and released on a CD compilation of her recordings, The Nixa Years: Volume 2.

Henderson's biggest hit was "Trudie", which made number 14 in the UK Singles Chart, and number 1 in the sheet music chart, in which it was the biggest hit of 1958. The song won him an Ivor Novello Award. His single "Treble Chance" charted at number 28 in October 1959, and in March 1960, he had his last chart hit with "Ooh! La! La!", which made number 44.

Henderson wrote the music for the 1960 British film Jazz Boat, for which he received a Certificate of Honour at the 1960 Ivor Novello Awards.

His television appearances included Tonight at the London Palladium and the Wheeltappers and Shunters Social Club; he was often at the top or near the top of the bill for stage shows during summer seasons in British resorts such as Blackpool, Bournemouth, Great Yarmouth, Margate and Hastings.

He continued to work throughout the 1960s and 1970s, including television and stage appearances, as well as presenting a daily weekday afternoon show on BBC Radio 2, Melody Time. Henderson appeared in pantomime as Buttons in the 1968/69 Southampton Gaumont Theatre production of Cinderella.

Henderson was interviewed by Roy Plomley for BBC Radio 4's Desert Island Discs, broadcast on 15 July 1972, in which he talked about how he got into music, and the composing process.

== Personal life and death ==
On 27 November 1961, Henderson married 22-year old dancer Janet Munton-Buckel, known professionally as Janet Brunell, in secret at Caxton Hall, Westminster. The couple met at a summer season in Scarborough, and were together in a 1961 Bournemouth summer show, Sing it With Joe.

He subsequently married Joyce Greenaway, a singer and dancer, in Paignton, Devon, in September 1978. They had met when he was topping the bill at the Princess Theatre, Torquay, in a show she was a dancer in. She became his private secretary in 1971.

Henderson collapsed suddenly at his home after suffering from a heart attack on the morning of 4 May 1980, two days after his 60th birthday. Despite her efforts, his wife Joyce was unable to revive him. He had latterly lived at Trellick Tower in Kensal Town, west London.

He was buried at Christ Church, Paignton. As well as his wife Joyce, Henderson was also survived by a son, Paul.

== Discography ==
=== Albums ===
- Dancing Cheek to Cheek (1959) – Pye Records NSPL 83006
- Joe 'Mr Piano' Henderson (With Geoff Love & His Orchestra and the Williams Singers) (1961) – Pye Records
- Sing Along From the Shows (1962) – Parlophone PMC 1182
- Winifred Atwell and Joe 'Mr Piano' Henderson – Party Time With Winnie and Joe (1962) – Pye Golden Guinea
- Join in With Joe (1966) – March Arch MAL 638
- Plays Around the World (1967) – Marble Arch MAL 685
- Greatest Pop Hits (1968) – Polydor
- The Hits of 1968 (1968) – Mercury
- Around The Piano With Joe Henderson and His Friends (1969) – Fontana SFL 13180
- Sing-In (1969) – Mercury 20153SMCL
- Secret Love and Other Unforgettable Hits of the 50s (1972) – Columbia Two 369
- Join in and Swingalong With (1974) – Spark SRLM 109
- 40 All Time Singalong Party Hits (1975) – Warwick Records

=== UK Singles Chart discography ===
- "Sing It With Joe" (June 1955) – Polygon P 1167 – No. 14
- "Sing It Again With Joe" (September 1955) – Polygon P 1184 – UK No. 18
- "Trudie" (July 1958) – Pye Nixa N 15147 – UK No. 14
- "Treble Chance" (October 1959) – Pye 7N 1522 – UK No. 28
- "Ooh! La! La!" (March 1960) – Pye 7N 1525 – UK No. 44
