= A House Divided (Upstairs, Downstairs) =

- Upstairs, Downstairs episode
- Episode no.: Season 3 Episode 2
- Directed by: Raymond Menmuir
- Written by: Alfred Shaughnessy
- Original air date: 3 November 1973

Guest appearance
- Arthur Brough (Mr. Stallinbrass)

Episode chronology
← Previous "Miss Forrest"	Next → "A Change of Scene"

"A House Divided" is the second episode of the third series of the British television series, Upstairs, Downstairs. The episode is set in 1912.

== Plot ==
Lady Marjorie Bellamy, her brother Hugo Talbot-Carey (the Earl of Southwold), and his new wife (widow Marion Worsley) die in the sinking of the RMS Titanic. Her lady's maid, Miss Roberts survives the sinking but Lady Marjorie perishes, her last known words being uttered to her maid—"Keep this for me, Roberts"—as she hands over her jewellery box.

After being listed as missing, Miss Roberts shows up at 165 Eaton Place, to the astonishment of the household, having not been on the list of survivors. Miss Roberts refuses to let anyone touch the jewellery box, believing she is keeping it for Lady Marjorie. She is however emotionally disturbed by the sinking and loss of Lady Marjorie, taking the blame personally. Richard's new secretary, Hazel Forrest, wins the hearts of all when she very gently persuades Miss Roberts to open the box. That means accepting that Lady Marjorie is gone and Miss Roberts breaks down as she cries, "I tried to save her! I tried to make them [the life boat] go back! I tried to save my Lady."

== Guest cast ==
- Stallinbrass — Arthur Brough
- Mr. Arthur Forrest — Leonard Trolley
- Roberts — Patsy Smart
