= Impact (1959 album) =

Studio album by Buddy Morrow
- Released: 1959
- Venue: Webster Hall, New York City
- Genre: Big band, Pop, Theme music
- Length: 27:23
- Label: RCA Victor
- Producer: Herman Diaz, Jr.

Impact is an LP of twelve musical themes from popular television programs of the late 1950s performed by the Buddy Morrow Orchestra.

== Origin and concept ==
In the face of the increasing popularity of theme music for television programs, coupled with advances in hi-fi and stereo home audio equipment, RCA Victor released Buddy Morrow's Impact in June 1959. The tracks were arranged by Ray Martin, famed British composer, producer and arranger, who had moved to the U.S. two years earlier. The album was recorded at Webster Hall in New York City. The recording engineer was Bob Simpson.

The liner notes to Impact say its concept is "to project the new sound in music which underscores today's action-packed, top-rated TV shows," characterizing the music as not only "brassy and succinct," but also "highly dramatic and exciting," taken from programs "replete with agitated adventure, conflict, the clash of good-men with bad-men."

== Reception ==
In its June 15, 1959, issue, Billboard magazine listed Impact as one of its Spotlight Winners of the Week, among those with the strongest sales potential of all albums reviewed that week. The album was later selected as a Billboard Album Spotlight Winner, for the month of August 1959.

Reviewing the album, The Cash Box magazine said the jazz directed themes should "fare well in light of the current TV jazz theme trend," incorporating "particularly fine" stereo direction.

High Fidelity magazine characterized the album as "hard driving, jazz versions" of popular TV show themes, highlighting the "exuberant Rawhide and blustering Black Saddle selections." It said some of the tracks were "perhaps overly raucous or (as in the Perry Mason and Sea Hunt themes) pretentious, but they all pack genuinely dramatic impact".

Reviewer Bruce Eder observed some "genuinely peculiar and enjoyable oddities here, such as Morrow's interpretation of 'Parade of the Chessmen,' the theme from 'Racket Squad', authored by Joseph Mullendore. It's a pop instrumental that comes to life in its middle section when the winds take over for a few bars, followed by the saxes."

Impact reached a high of number 29 on The Cash Box list of best selling stereo albums in September 1959.

== Track listing ==
Track	Title	Composers	Length
1	"This Is The Naked City"	George Duning, Ned Washington	3:25
2	"Rawhide"	Dimitri Tiomkin, Ned Washington	1:50
3	"Riff Blues"	Dave Kahn, Melvin Lenard	2:05
4	"Richard Diamond	Pete Rugolo	2:27
5	"Perry Mason Theme"	Fred Steiner	2:34
6	"Parade of The Chessmen"	Joseph Mullendore	1:55
7	"M Squad"	Count Basie	2:25
8	"Sea Hunt Theme"	Ray Llewellyn	1:57
9	"Black Saddle "	J. Michael Hennagin	2:06
10	"Waterfront"	Alexander László	2:00
11	"Highway Patrol"	Richard Llewellyn	2:19
12	"Peter Gunn"	Henry Mancini	1:45
