= Johnny Brandon =

English singer (1924–2017)

Brandon on cover of "To-Morrow" sheet music

John Arthur Brandon (16 July 1924 – 26 July 2017) was an English singer and songwriter, popular during the 1950s, who recorded for a number of labels. His perennial backing group was known as The Phantoms. He was born in Hackney, London. His hits included "Tomorrow" and "Don't Worry". He also recorded versions of "Slow Poke" (re-titled as "Slow Coach") and "Painting the Clouds with Sunshine".

Brandon later composed several Off-Broadway musicals, including Cindy (1964) and Billy Noname (1970). In 1979, he was jointly nominated for a Tony Award for Best Original Score for his work on Eubie!. Brandon is also known for his involvement in the musicals Ain't Doin' Nothin' But Singin' My Song (1982) and Oh, Diahne! (1997).

Brandon released his first solo album, Then and Now, in 2005 (a compilation of his old recordings combined with several that were new). He died on 26 July 2017, at the age of 93.

== Chart single discography ==
- "Tomorrow" (1955) (Polygon) – UK number 8, credited as Johnny Brandon with The Phantoms and The Norman Warren Music
- "Don't Worry" (1955) (Polygon) – UK number 18, credited as Johnny Brandon with The Phantoms

== Selected filmography ==
- Fun at St. Fanny's (1956)

== See also ==
- Polygon Records discography
- List of gay, lesbian or bisexual people: Bi-Bz
