= Dennis Lotis =

South African–born British singer and actor (1925–2023)

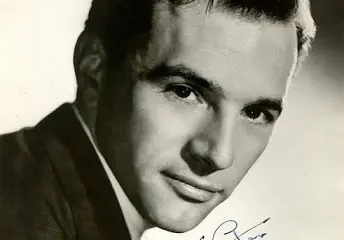

Background information
- Born: Dennis Christos Lotis; 8 March 1925; Johannesburg, South Africa
- Died: 8 February 2023 (aged 97) Stiffkey, Norfolk, England
- Genres: Swing music, pop
- Occupations: Singer, actor
- Years active: Late 1940s–2005
- Labels: Polygon; Decca; Pye; Columbia; King; Polydor

Dennis Christos Lotis (8 March 1925 – 8 February 2023) was a South African-born British singer, actor, and entertainer, whose popularity was greatest in the 1950s. He was described as having "a sophisticated style that was particularly attractive to the young female population".

== Early life ==
Lotis was born in Johannesburg, South Africa, on 8 March 1925. His Greek father was from Ithaca, while his English mother was from Canterbury.

== Career ==
Lotis trained as a boy soprano, and made his first stage appearances and radio broadcasts as a child. After leaving school at the age of 15 he worked as a bus conductor and electrician, as well as singing in clubs and cinemas in Johannesburg. He married and left South Africa with his wife at the start of the 1950s, moving to Britain, where he was introduced to bandleader Ted Heath. He joined the Ted Heath Orchestra, singing alongside Lita Roza and Dickie Valentine. His first record was a cover version of Al Martino's hit "Here in My Heart", released in September 1952 on the independent Polygon label. He later recorded with the Johnston Brothers and Ted Heath and His Music; "Such a Night" / "Cuddle Me" was released by Decca Records in 1954.

Lotis went solo in the mid-1950s, and became one of the most successful acts on the British variety circuit, also appearing frequently on BBC radio. He appeared in his first Royal Variety Performance in 1957, and that year was voted Top Male Singer in the Melody Maker annual poll. He also toured the US with the Ted Heath Orchestra. Lotis recorded in the late 1950s and early 1960s for the Pye Nixa and Columbia labels. However, none of his records made the UK Singles Chart.

In 1956, Lotis toured with a production of the musical Harmony Close, and first worked as an actor in 1959 in John Osborne's The World of Paul Slickey. He also appeared in several British films, including It's A Wonderful World & The Extra Day (1956), The City of the Dead (also known as Horror Hotel, 1960), Sword of Sherwood Forest (1960), What Every Woman Wants (1962), and She'll Have to Go (1962). He also appeared on stage as Lucio in John Neville's production of Shakespeare's Measure for Measure.

Lotis continued his career as a singer, appearing on Six-Five Special and Thank Your Lucky Stars, and in the 1960s recorded for the King and Polydor labels. However, his style of music was going out of style, and after a period playing working men's clubs, he established his own antiques and restaurant business in Tring. He returned to musical performances in theatres in the 1980s, and gave a farewell performance in Mundesley, Norfolk, in 2005, following concerts in France and Spain.

== Personal life and death ==
Lotis married model Rena Mackie before leaving South Africa. A Pathé News film from 1958 shows him at home with his wife, children, and extensive collection of pipes. They lived in Mill Hill, Kings Langley, and Tring before moving to Field Dalling in Norfolk in 1982. He remarried after his wife's death and later lived in Stiffkey on the North Norfolk coast.

Lotis died at home on 8 February 2023, aged 97.

== Filmography ==
- The Extra Day (1956)
- It's a Wonderful World (1956)
- The Golden Disc (1958)
- Make Mine a Million (1959)
- The City of the Dead aka Horror Hotel (1960)
- Sword of Sherwood Forest (1960)
- What Every Woman Wants (1962)
- She'll Have to Go (1962)
