= Ray Martin (orchestra leader) =

Austrian-British orchestra leader (1918–1988)

- Also known as: Marshall Ross
- Born: Kurt Kohn; 11 October 1918
- Origin: Vienna, Austria
- Died: 7 February 1988 (aged 69)
- Occupations: Music director, composer, conductor, orchestra leader
- Instruments: Violin, piano
- Years active: 1940s–1980s

Raymond Stuart Martin (born Kurt Kohn; 11 October 1918 – 7 February 1988) was an Austrian-British orchestra leader. He was noted for his light music compositions. Allmusic journalist Bradley Torreano stated, "Ray Martin created a legacy for himself in British popular music through his work with his orchestra during the 1950s. His regular appearances on radio and television kept him in the public spotlight, while his position at EMI Records made him an influential producer at the label. His use of pseudonyms has blurred the path of his career through the years, making his many contributions even harder to keep track of. But his original compositions are what really made him popular; tracks like "Marching Strings" have become stables [sic] of many public and city bands and orchestras since their release".

== Career ==
Raymond Stuart Martin was born as Kurt Kohn into a liberal Jewish family in Vienna, Austria. His first steps into music came training as a violinist. He studied at the Imperial Academy of Music and the Performing Arts in Vienna. In 1938, he immigrated to England and was a Carroll Levis discovery.

Around this time, Martin was viewed by the British government as possible German spy during World War II, so he was arrested and placed on the ship HMT Dunera that took him and many others to Australia where he was interned at Hay, Tatura and Loveday prisoner of war camps. He returned to England in October 1941, joining the British Army, having been officially cleared.

As he was multilingual, he served in the Intelligence Corps for six years. He became an arranger and composer for the Royal Air Force Band. During this time, he also managed to rescue his brother who was imprisoned in a concentration camp or possibly a prisoner of war camp. After the war's end, he worked in radio for the British Forces Network in Hamburg, Germany, and later formed his own orchestra for a programme called Melody from the Sky, which had over 500 broadcasts.

Martin became the conductor of the BBC Northern Variety Orchestra, and also worked for EMI as a record producer and arranger. Whilst working as an executive and talent scout for EMI/Columbia in the early 1950s, he spotted Ruby Murray, and was the first to put her on record. During this period, he wrote many scores for TV and movies, including the score to the Diana Dors film Yield to the Night in 1956. He moved to the US in 1957, where he worked on both Broadway and Hollywood productions. In 1959, he arranged two LPs of classic US television themes named Impact and Double Impact on RCA Victor for Buddy Morrow and his Orchestra, one of the first such collections on record. In that same year, Martin contributed performances to half of the songs (with singer Mimi Hines) on the Christmas album The Merriest of Pops (RCA Victor), the other half being provided by Esquivel.

Martin composed more than 2,000 works, many of which were recorded for RCA and Polydor.

He returned to the UK in 1972, but was comparatively unproductive. In 1980, he moved to South Africa, where he died after suffering from cancer, aged 69, in Johannesburg.

== Selection of his light music titles ==
- "Melody from the Sky"
- "Once upon a Wintertime"
- "Blue Violins"
- "Waltzing Bugle Boy"
- "Airborne"
- "Ballet of the Bells"
- "Tango of the Bells"
- "Marching Strings" (composition credited to Marshall Ross, a pseudonym) – was used as the theme tune for BBC school quiz show, Top of the Form
- "Begorrah"
- "The Sound of Sight"

== Chart singles ==
- "Blue Tango (1952, Columbia) – UK No. 8
- "Swedish Rhapsody" (1953, Columbia) – UK No. 4
- "The Carousel Waltz" (1956, Columbia) – UK No. 24
