= Petula Clark =

British actress and singer (born 1932)

Petula Clark CBE
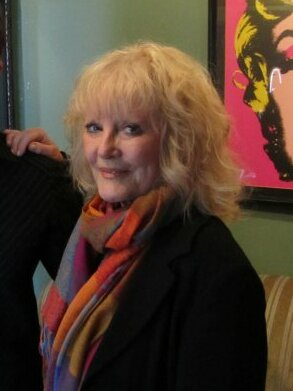
- Clark in 2010

Background information
- Born: Sally Clark; 15 November 1932 (age 94); Ewell, Surrey, England
- Genres: Pop; schlager; theatre; film
- Occupations: Actress; songwriter; vocalist
- Years active: 1939–present
- Labels: Polygon; Vogue; Pye; Imperial; Decca; EMI; Warner Bros.; MGM; Columbia
- Spouse: Claude Wolff (m. 1961; died 2024)
- Website: petulaclark.net
- Children: 3

Sally "Petula" Clark CBE (born 15 November 1932) is a British singer, songwriter and actress. She started her professional career as a child performer. She has spent more than 8 decades in the industry, making her one of the longest serving performers in history.

Clark's professional career began in November 1942 as a child entertainer on BBC Radio. In 1954, she charted with "The Little Shoemaker", the first of her big UK hits, and within two years she began recording in French. Her international successes have included "Prends mon cœur", "Sailor" (a UK number one), "Romeo", and "Chariot". Hits in German, Italian and Spanish followed.

In late 1964, Clark's success extended to the United States with a five-year run of career-defining, often upbeat singles, many written or co-written by Tony Hatch and Jackie Trent. These include her signature song "Downtown" (US number one), "I Know a Place", "My Love" (US number one), "A Sign of the Times", "I Couldn't Live Without Your Love", "Who Am I", "Colour My World", "This Is My Song" (by Charlie Chaplin; a UK number one), "Don't Sleep in the Subway" and "Kiss Me Goodbye". Between January 1965 and April 1968, Clark charted with nine US top 20 hits in the US, where she was called "the First Lady of the British Invasion". Her international chart success was unequalled in recording history. In 1968 she was the recipient of the MIDEM international award for the highest worldwide sales by a female artist. This followed on from her 1967 MIDEM award for most sales in Europe by a European artist.

It is estimated that Clark has sold 100 million records. She also enjoyed success in the musical film Finian's Rainbow, for which she received a Golden Globe nomination for best actress in a musical, and in the stage musicals The Sound of Music, Sunset Boulevard and Mary Poppins, for which she received BAFTA nominations. Clark, along with David Cassidy, has also been credited with rescuing Blood Brothers from failure in her Broadway debut.

== Biography ==
=== Early career ===
Petula Clark was born Sally Clark on 15 November 1932 in Ewell, Surrey, England to Doris (née Phillips) and Leslie Noah Clark. Both of Clark's parents were nurses at Long Grove Hospital in Epsom. Clark's mother had Welsh ancestry and her father was English. Clark's stage name, Petula, was invented by her father, who joked that it was a combination of the names of his two former girlfriends, Pet and Ulla.

Clark grew up in Abercanaid, near Merthyr Tydfil in Wales. Her grandfather was a coal miner. Her first ever live audience was in 1939 at the Colliers' Arms in Abercanaid. She also recalls living just outside London during the Blitz, watching the dogfights in the air and running to air-raid shelters with her sister. Later, when she was eight, she joined other children to record messages with the BBC to be broadcast to members of their families in the forces. The recording event was in the Criterion Theatre, an underground theatre that was safe. When the air-raid siren sounded other children were upset and a call went out for someone to step forward and sing to calm them. Clark volunteered, and they liked her voice so much in the control room that they recorded her. Her song was "Mighty Like a Rose".

As a child, Clark sang in the chapel choir and showed a talent for mimicry, impersonating Vera Lynn, Carmen Miranda and Sophie Tucker for her family and friends. Her father introduced her to theatre in 1944 when he took her to see Flora Robson in a production of Mary Stuart. She later recalled that after the performance, "I made up my mind then and there I was going to be an actress. ... I wanted to be Ingrid Bergman more than anything else in the world." However, her first public performances were as a singer. In 1945, she performed with an orchestra in the entrance hall of Bentall's Department Store in Kingston upon Thames for a tin of toffee and a gold wristwatch.

=== Career start ===
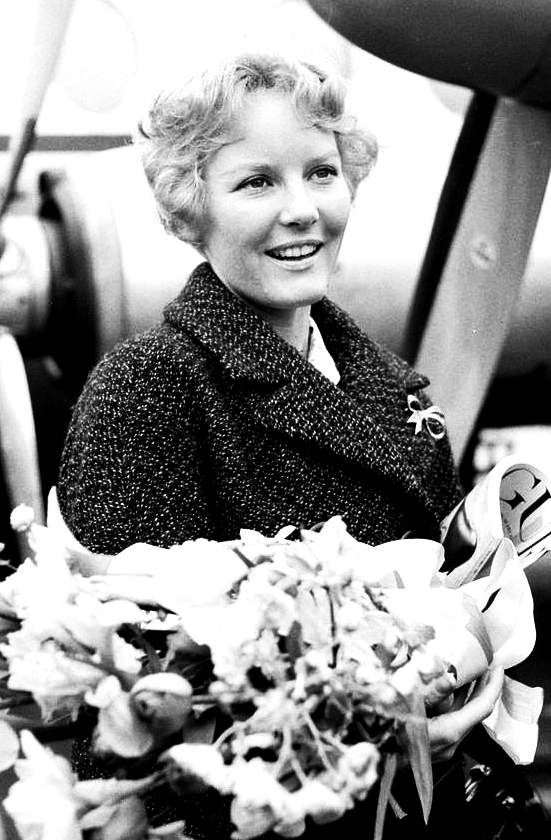
Clark arriving in the Netherlands in 1960

From a chance beginning at the age of seven, Clark appeared on radio, in film, in print, on television and on recordings. In October 1942, the nine-year-old Clark made her radio debut while attending a BBC broadcast with her father. She was trying to send a message to an uncle who was stationed overseas, but the broadcast was delayed by an air raid. During the bombing the producer requested that someone perform to settle the jittery theatre audience and she volunteered a rendering of "Mighty Lak' a Rose" to an enthusiastic response. She then repeated her performance for the broadcast audience, launching a series of some 500 appearances in programmes designed to entertain the troops.

In addition to radio work, Clark frequently toured the United Kingdom with fellow child performer Julie Andrews. Nicknamed the "Singing Sweetheart", she performed for George VI, Winston Churchill and Bernard Montgomery. She also became known as "Britain's Shirley Temple", and was considered a mascot by the British Army, some of whose troops plastered her photos on their tanks for good luck as they advanced into battle.

While she was performing at the Royal Albert Hall in London in 1944, Clark was discovered by the film director Maurice Elvey, who cast her, at the age of 12, as the precocious orphaned waif Irma in his war drama Medal for the General. In quick succession she performed in Strawberry Roan, I Know Where I'm Going!, London Town, Here Come the Huggetts, Vote for Huggett and The Huggetts Abroad, the second, third and fourth of four Huggett Family films. She worked with Anthony Newley in Vice Versa (directed by Peter Ustinov) and Alec Guinness in The Card.

In 1945, Clark was featured in the comic Radio Fun, in which she was billed as "Radio's Merry Mimic". By then she felt that she had played child parts for too long.

In 1946, Clark began her television career with an appearance on a BBC variety show, Cabaret Cartoons, which led to her being signed to host her own afternoon series, Petula Clark. Pet's Parlour followed in 1950.

In 1947, she met Joe "Mr Piano" Henderson at the Peter Maurice Publishing Company. The two collaborated musically and were linked romantically over the following ten years. In 1949 Henderson introduced her to the record producer Alan A. Freeman, who, together with her father Leslie, formed Polygon Records, for which she recorded her earliest hits. She recorded her first release that year, "Put Your Shoes On, Lucy", for EMI, and further recordings with vocalist Benny Lee on Decca. The Polygon label was financed with part of her earnings. She scored a number of major hits in the UK during the 1950s, including "The Little Shoemaker" (1954), "Majorca" (1955), "Suddenly There's a Valley" (1955) and "With All My Heart" (1956). "The Little Shoemaker" was an international hit, reaching number one in Australia, the first of many number-one records in her career.

Near the end of 1955, Polygon Records was sold to Nixa Records, then part of Pye Records, leading to the establishment of Pye Nixa Records (subsequently simply Pye). This effectively signed Clark to the Pye label in the UK, for which she recorded until the early 1970s.

During this period she showed a keen interest in encouraging new talent. She suggested that Henderson be allowed to record his own music, and he had five chart hits on Polygon/Pye between 1955 and 1960.

=== European fame ===
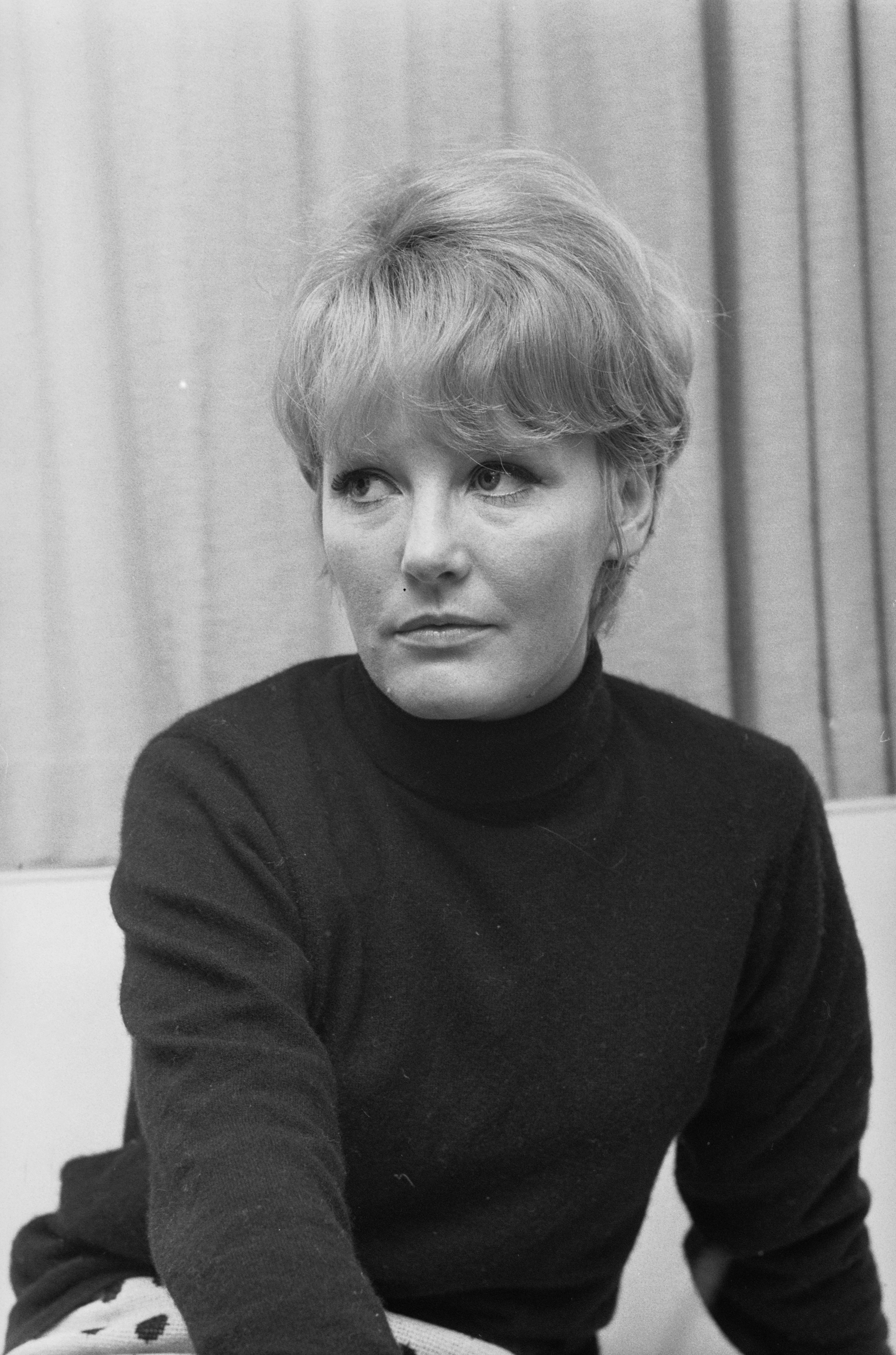
Clark in Zurich (1966)

In 1957, Clark was invited to appear at the Paris Olympia, where, despite her misgivings and a bad cold, she was received with acclaim. The following day, she was invited to the office of Vogue Records to discuss a contract. There she met her future longtime publicist, collaborator and husband, Claude Wolff. Clark was attracted immediately, and when she was told that she would be working with him if she signed with the Vogue label she agreed.

In 1960, she embarked on a concert tour of France and Belgium with Sacha Distel, who remained a close friend until his death in 2004. Gradually she moved further into the continent, recording in German, French, Italian and Spanish.

While she focused on her new career in France, she continued to achieve hit records in the UK into the early 1960s. Her 1961 recording of "Sailor" became her first number-one hit in the UK, while such follow-up recordings as "Romeo" and "My Friend the Sea" landed her in the British Top-10 later that year. "Romeo" sold more than one million copies around the world and won her her first gold disc, which was awarded by the Recording Industry Association of America. In France "Ya Ya Twist" (a French-language cover of the Lee Dorsey rhythm and blues song "Ya Ya" and the only successful recording of a twist song by a woman) and "Chariot" (the original version of "I Will Follow Him") became smash hits in 1962, while German and Italian versions of her English and French recordings charted, as well. Her recordings of several Serge Gainsbourg songs were also big sellers. In addition, she was given at this time a present of the song "Un Enfant" by Jacques Brel, with whom she toured. Clark is one of only a handful of performers to be given a song by Brel. A live recording of this song charted in Canada.

In 1963, she wrote the soundtrack for the French crime film A Couteaux Tirés (Daggers Drawn) – released in 1964 – and made a cameo appearance as herself in the film. Although it was only a mild success, it added a new dimension—that of film composer—to her career. Additional film scores she composed include Entre ciel et mer (1963), Rêves d'enfant (1964), La bande à Bebel (1966), and Pétain (1989). Six themes from the last were released on the CD In Her Own Write in 2007.

Clark was the subject of This Is Your Life in February 1964, April 1975 and March 1996, becoming the only person to receive the television tribute three times.

=== Global fame – the "Downtown" era ===
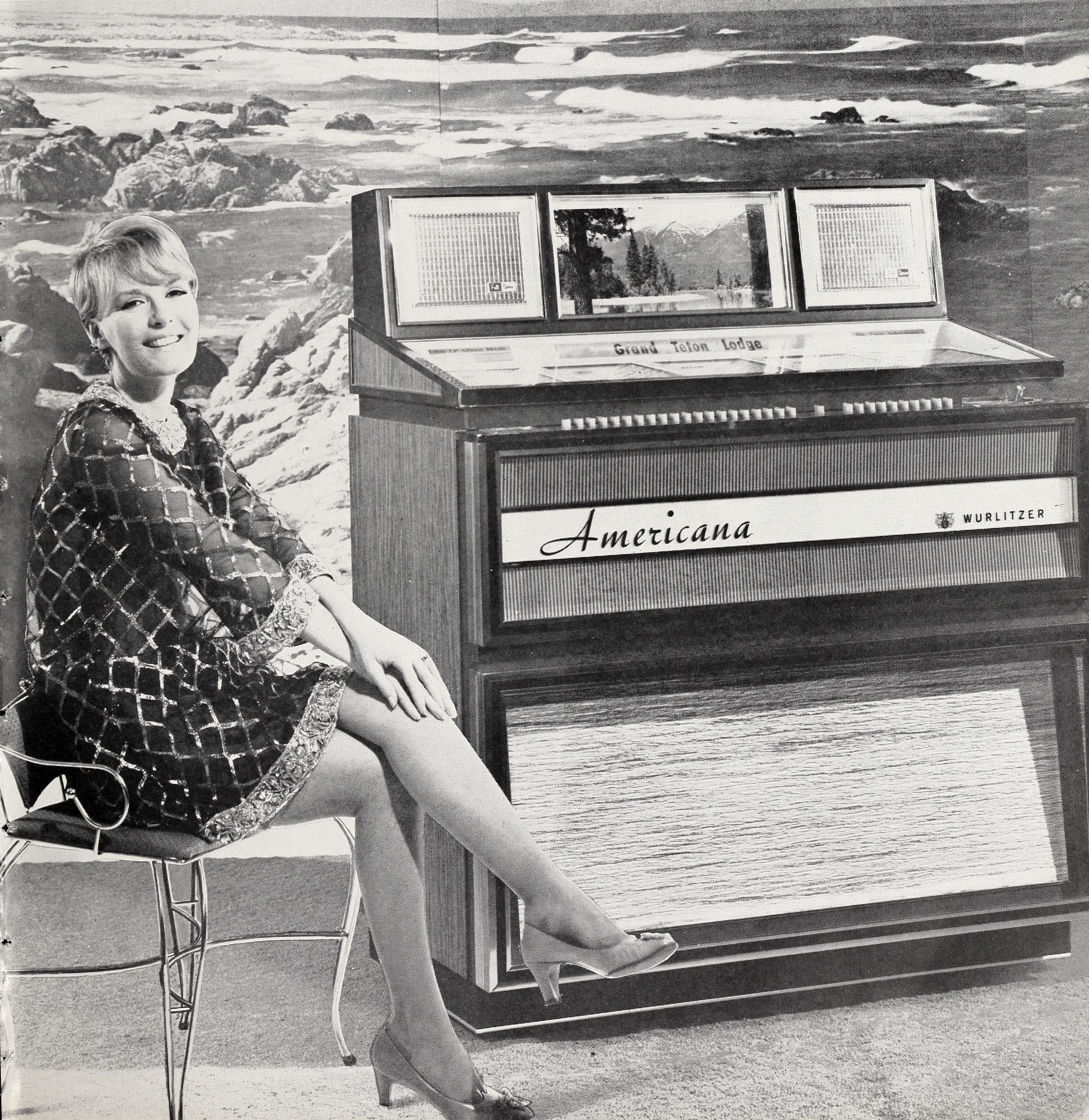
Clark on the cover of Cash Box, 5 November 1966

By 1964, Clark's British recording career was foundering. Composer/arranger Tony Hatch, who had been assisting her with her work for Vogue Records in France and Pye Records in the UK, flew to her home in Paris with new song material he hoped would interest her, but she found none of it appealing. Desperate, he played for her a few chords of an incomplete song that had been inspired by his recent first trip to New York City. Upon hearing the melody, Clark told him that if he could write lyrics as good as the melody, she wanted to record the tune as her next single—"Downtown". Hatch has subsequently denied originally offering "Downtown" to the Drifters.

Neither Clark, who was performing in Canada when the song first received major air play, nor Hatch realised the effect the song would have on their respective careers. Released in four separate languages in late 1964, "Downtown" was a success in the UK, France (in both the English and the French versions), the Netherlands, Germany, Australia, and Italy, and Rhodesia, Japan, and India as well. During a visit to London, Warner Bros. executive Joe Smith heard it and acquired the rights for the United States. "Downtown" went to number one in the American charts in January 1965, and 3 million copies were sold in the United States.

"Downtown" was the first of 15 consecutive Top-40 hits she achieved in the U.S., including "I Know a Place", "My Love" (her second US number-one hit), "A Sign of the Times", "I Couldn't Live Without Your Love", "This Is My Song" (from the Charles Chaplin film A Countess from Hong Kong), and "Don't Sleep in the Subway". The American recording industry honoured her with Grammy Awards for Best Rock & Roll Recording of 1964 for "Downtown" and for Best Contemporary (R&R) Vocal Performance of 1965 – Female for "I Know a Place". In 2004, her recording of "Downtown" was inducted into the Grammy Hall of Fame.

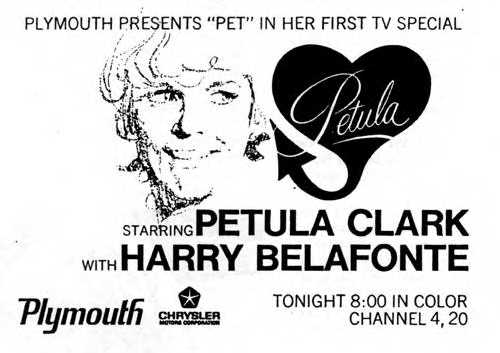
Ad for the 1968 NBC-TV special was controversial even before it aired

Her recording successes led to frequent appearances on American variety programmes hosted by Ed Sullivan and Dean Martin, guest shots on Hullabaloo, The Kraft Music Hall, The Hollywood Palace, Shindig! and inclusion in musical specials such as The Best on Record and Rodgers and Hart Today.

Clark holding Belafonte's arm

In 1968, NBC invited Clark to host her own special in the US, and in doing so, she inadvertently made television history. While singing a duet of "On the Path of Glory", an antiwar song that she had composed, with guest Harry Belafonte, she took hold of his arm, to the dismay of a representative from the Chrysler Corporation (the show's sponsor), who feared that the moment would provoke racial backlash from Southern viewers. When he insisted that they substitute a different take, with Clark and Belafonte standing well away from each other, Clark and the executive producer of the show – her husband, Wolff – refused, destroyed all other takes of the song, and delivered the finished programme to NBC with the touch intact.

The Chrysler representative lost his job and the programme aired on 8 April 1968, four days after the assassination of Martin Luther King Jr., with high ratings, critical acclaim, and a Primetime Emmy nomination. It has erroneously been described as the first instance on American television of physical contact between a black man and a white woman, forgetting many previous instances, including Frankie Lymon dancing with a white girl on Alan Freed's live ABC show The Big Beat on 19 July 1957, Nancy Sinatra kissing Sammy Davis Jr., on her 1967 Movin' with Nancy TV special, and Louis Armstrong shaking hands with "What's My Line?" panelists Dorothy Kilgallen and Arlene Francis in 1953. To commemorate the 40th anniversary of the 1968 Belafonte telecast, Clark and Wolff appeared at the Paley Center for Media in Manhattan on 22 September 2008, to discuss the broadcast and its impact, following a showing of the programme.

Clark was later the hostess of two more specials; Portrait of Petula, shown on both the NBC and CBC networks in early 1970, and one for ABC (Petula) which served as a pilot for a projected weekly series. She starred in the BBC television series This Is Petula Clark, which aired from mid-1966 to early 1968.

Clark revived her film career in the late 1960s, starring in two big musical films. In Finian's Rainbow (1968), she starred opposite Fred Astaire, and she was nominated for the Golden Globe Award for Best Actress – Motion Picture Musical or Comedy for her performance. The following year, she was cast with Peter O'Toole in Goodbye, Mr. Chips (1969), a musical adaptation of the classic James Hilton novella.

Throughout the late 1960s, she toured in concerts in the U.S., and she often appeared in supper clubs such as the Copacabana in New York City, the Ambassador Hotel's Cocoanut Grove in Los Angeles, and the Empire Room at the Waldorf-Astoria Hotel.

During this period Clark continued her interest in encouraging new talent. These efforts also supported the launch of Herb Alpert and his A&M record label. In 1968, she brought the French composer/arranger Michel Colombier to the U.S. to work as her musical director, and introduced him to Alpert. Colombier went on to co-write the film score for Purple Rain with Prince, composed the acclaimed pop symphony Wings, and a number of soundtracks for American films. Richard Carpenter credited her with bringing his sister Karen and him to Alpert's attention when they performed at a premiere party for the 1969 Goodbye, Mr. Chips.

Clark has recalled that she and Karen Carpenter went to see Elvis Presley perform in Las Vegas and that afterwards "He was flirting with both of us, (saying) 'Wow, the two biggest girl pop stars in my dressing room. That's pretty good'... He didn't have us, exactly, but he had a darned good try. Not going to talk about that any more."

Clark was one of the backing vocalists on John Lennon's Plastic Ono Band anthem "Give Peace a Chance". She was performing in Montreal in June 1969, and was being heckled by the audience due to her bilingual performance. She went to see Lennon for advice on dealing with this. He and his wife Yoko Ono were staying at the city's Queen Elizabeth Hotel during their bed-in protest. Clark subsequently ended up on the recording of Give Peace a Chance. On 15 November 1969, her concert, An Evening with Petula, from the Royal Albert Hall in London, was the first BBC One colour transmission.

=== 1970–2000 ===
During the early 1970s, Clark had chart singles on both sides of the Atlantic with "Melody Man" (1970), "The Song of My Life" (1971), "I Don't Know How To Love Him" (1972), "The Wedding Song (There Is Love)" (1972), and "Loving Arms" (1974). In Canada, "Je Voudrais Qu'il Soit Malheureux" was a major hit. She continued touring during the 1970s, performing in clubs in the US and Europe. During this period, she also appeared in print and radio ads for the Coca-Cola Corporation, television commercials for Plymouth automobiles, print and TV spots for Burlington Industries and Chrysler Sunbeam, as well as print ads for Sanderson wallpaper in the UK.

In the mid-1970s, she scaled back her career to devote more time to her family. On 31 December 1976, she performed her hit song "Downtown" on BBC1's A Jubilee of Music, celebrating British popular music for Queen Elizabeth II's impending Silver Jubilee. She also hosted the television series The Sound of Petula (1972–74), and through the 1970s, made numerous guest appearances on variety, comedy, and game-show television programmes. She appeared as a special guest star in an episode of The Muppet Show in 1977. In 1980 she made her last film appearance, in the British production Never Never Land. Her last television appearance was acting in the 1981 French miniseries Sans Famille (An Orphan's Tale). A 1981 single, "Natural Love", reached number 66 on Billboard's Hot 100 chart and number 20 on the US country singles chart in early 1982.

As Clark moved away from film and television, she returned to the stage. In 1954, she had starred in a stage production of The Constant Nymph, but at the urging of her children, did not return to legitimate theatre until 1981, starring as Maria von Trapp in The Sound of Music at the Apollo Victoria Theatre, West End of London. Opening to positive reviews and what was then the largest advance sale in British theatre history, Clark—proclaimed by Maria Von Trapp herself as "the best Maria ever"—extended her initial six-month run to 13 to accommodate the huge demand for tickets and receiving a Laurence Olivier Award nomination for Best Actress in a Musical. On 6 February 1983, during a concert at the Albert Hall she gave a heart-rending performance of For All We Know in tribute to her friend Karen Carpenter who had died two days previously. Also in 1983, she took on the title role in George Bernard Shaw's Candida.

Her later stage work includes Someone Like You in 1989 and 1990, for which she composed the score; Blood Brothers, in which she made her Broadway debut in 1993 at the Music Box Theatre, followed by the American tour; and Andrew Lloyd Webber's Sunset Boulevard, appearing in both the West End and American touring productions from 1995 to 2000. In 2004, she repeated her performance of Norma Desmond in a production at the Opera House in Cork, Ireland, which was later broadcast by the BBC. With more than 2,500 performances, she has played the role more often than any other actress.

A new disco remix of "Downtown", called "Downtown '88", was released in 1988, registering her first UK singles chart success since 1972, making the Top 10 in the UK in December 1988. A live vocal performance of this version was performed on the BBC show Top of the Pops. Clark recorded new material regularly throughout the 1970s, 1980s, and 1990s, and in 1992 released "Oxygen", a single produced by Andy Richards and written by Nik Kershaw.

In December 1995 Clark was the guest for BBC Radio 4's Desert Island Discs. She had previously been the guest twice before, in 1951 and in 1982.

In 1998, Clark was made a Commander of the Order of the British Empire (CBE) by Queen Elizabeth II. In 2012 she was installed as a Commander of the Ordre des Arts et des Lettres of France by the French Minister of Culture.

=== 2000–present ===
In both 1998 and 2002, Clark toured extensively throughout the UK. In 2000, she presented a self-written, one-woman show, highlighting her life and career, to large critical and audience acclaim at the St. Denis Theatre in Montreal. A 2003 concert appearance at the Olympia in Paris has been issued in both DVD and compact disc formats. In 2004, she toured Australia and New Zealand, appeared at the Hilton in Atlantic City, New Jersey; the Hummingbird Centre in Toronto; Humphrey's in San Diego; and the Mohegan Sun Casino in Uncasville, Connecticut; and participated in a multiperformer tribute to the late Peggy Lee at the Hollywood Bowl. Following another British concert tour in early spring 2005, after which, in May she contributed to the V45 televised BBC concert in Trafalgar Square with a rendition of "A Nightingale Sang in Berkeley Square", she appeared with Andy Williams in his Moon River Theatre in Branson, Missouri.

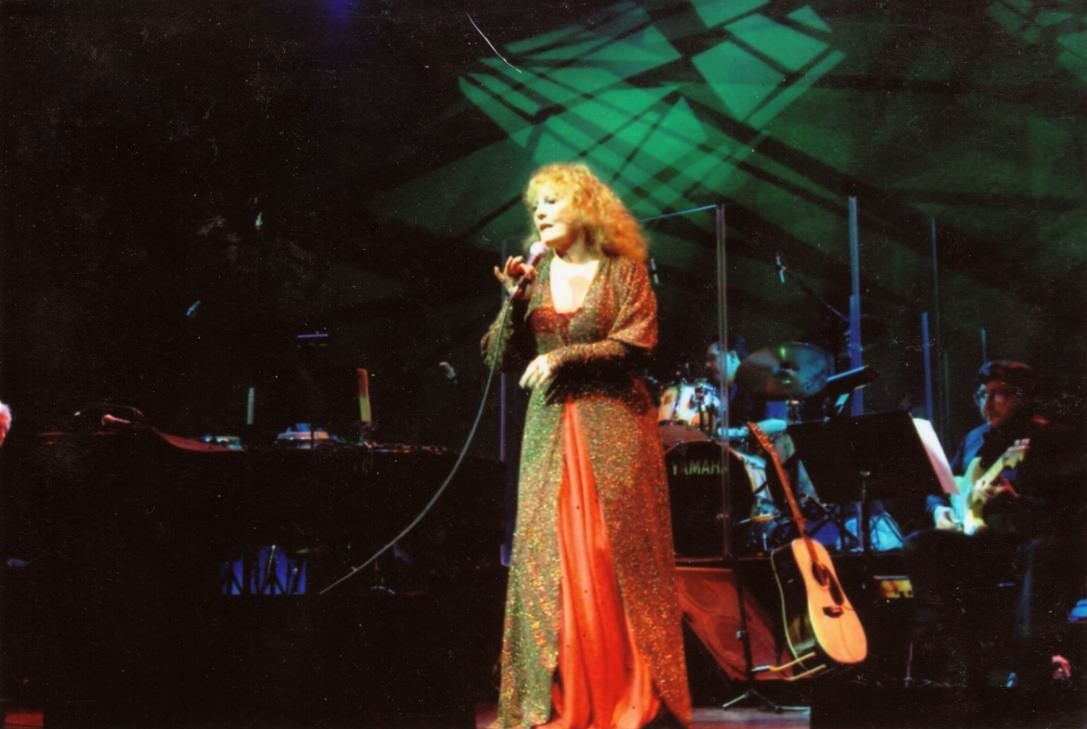
Clark performing in the Mohegan Sun Casino in Connecticut, US, on 11 October 2008

In November 2006, Clark was the subject of a BBC Four documentary titled Petula Clark: Blue Lady, and appeared with Michael Ball and Tony Hatch in a concert at the Theatre Royal, Drury Lane broadcast by BBC Radio the following month. Duets, a compilation including Dusty Springfield, Peggy Lee, Dean Martin, Bobby Darin and the Everly Brothers, among others, was released in February 2007; and Solitude and Sunshine, a studio recording of all new material by composer Rod McKuen, was released in July of that year.

She was the host of the March 2007 PBS fundraising special My Music: The British Beat, an overview of the musical British invasion of the United States during the 1960s, followed by a number of concert dates throughout the US, UK, Canada, Australia and New Zealand. She can be heard on the soundtrack of the 2007 independent film Downtown: A Street Tale. Une Baladine (in English, a wandering minstrel), an authorised pictorial biography by Françoise Piazza, was published in France and Switzerland in October 2007.

In 2007 Clark was the subject of the BBC Wales programme Coming Home about her Welsh family history. That same year she was presented with the 2007 Film and TV Music Award for Best Use of a Song in a Television Programme for "Downtown" in the ABC series Lost.

Then & Now, a compilation of greatest hits and several new Clark compositions, entered the UK Albums Chart in June 2008 and won Clark her first silver disc for an album. Open Your Heart: A Love Song Collection, a compilation of previously unreleased material and new and remixed recordings, was released in January 2009. A collection of holiday songs titled This Is Christmas, which includes some new Clark compositions in addition to previously released material, was released in November 2009.

At the Montreux Jazz Festival on 14 July 2008 Clark joined with Paolo Nutini to perform "Goin' to Chicago Blues" in celebration of Quincy Jones' 75th birthday.

In 2010, she became president of the Hastings Musical Festival, and appeared on the Vivement Dimanche show on French television. Her triple album Une Baladine included 10 new tracks and one new studio recording: "SOS Mozart", a writing collaboration of Gilbert Bécaud and Pierre Delanoë. Both her album set and the new recording of "SOS Mozart" were produced by David Hadzis at the Arthanor Productions studio in Geneva and appeared on the French charts. She was patron of 2011 Dinard British Film Festival.

Early in 2011, the Lark Street Business Improvement District in a section of the downtown area of Albany, New York, needed a name for its logo/mascot, a graphic image of a blue lark. An internet poll was held, and the winner was Petula Lark, clearly a reference to the singer of the adopted anthem of New York City's urban area, "Downtown". In November 2011, at age 78, Clark performed at the Casino de Paris, a Parisian music hall. She entertained for more than 90 minutes and introduced five new songs, one of which she had recently written with friend Charles Aznavour. A French album of all new material was to be released on 7 February 2012 on the Sony label, her first in that language since the late 1970s.

On 11 December 2011, the Saw Doctors released their version of "Downtown", featuring Clark. She appeared in the video for the song, which they recorded in Galway, and she in Paris. On 22 December 2011, the record reached number two on the Irish chart. In February 2012, Clark completed her first New York City show since 1975. Her show featured a parody of "Downtown", an idea that came from her musical director Grant Sturiale. After the end of her season, which was extended due to the demand for tickets, she returned to Paris to promote her new album, before flying to Australia for a tour.

Clark appeared as a guest on Radio 4's The Reunion in August 2012. In January 2013, she released a new album titled Lost in You. The album contains new music and some covers. She remade her famous "Downtown", and performed a cover of Gnarls Barkley's "Crazy". She also performed a new song called "Cut Copy Me", which had a 14-week run in the Belgium chart. The album entered the UK national album chart at number 24 on Sunday, 3 March 2013. Two of the songs, "Crazy" and "Downtown", were performed in Jools Holland's New Year "Hootenanny" on 1 January 2013, along with her 1966 number-six hit, "I Couldn't Live Without Your Love". On 20 June 2015, she appeared with the Midtown Men at the Beacon Theatre in New York City, performing "Downtown". Clark released a new English-language album, From Now On, in October 2016, and completed a tour of the UK to promote it. She made a cameo appearance in the 2017 London Heathrow Airport Christmas television commercial, accompanied by her song "I Couldn't Live without Your Love".

On 10 November 2017, an English-language album was released, Living for Today. She embarked on a tour of the US in November 2017. It was her first US tour in five decades. On 20 April 2018 a French-Canadian album was released, Vu d'ici. In March 2019 she was announced as returning to the West End stage in London for the first time in 20 years, performing in the upcoming revival of Mary Poppins as The Bird Woman. In March 2020, the United Music Foundation released A Valentine's Day at the Royal Albert Hall, a collector's edition including the complete recording of her concert at the Royal Albert Hall on 14 February 1974.

Clark appeared in Stephen Sondheim's Old Friends concert which aired on the BBC in January 2023. She performed "I'm Still Here" from Follies. The CD recording of this performance was released physically and digitally in December 2023.

Her autobiography Is That You, Petula? was published in 2025.

== Personal life ==
In 1955, Clark became linked romantically with Joe "Mr Piano" Henderson. Speculation that the couple planned to marry became rife. However, with the increasing glare of the public spotlight and her growing fame – her career in France was just beginning – Henderson, reportedly not wanting to end up as "Mr Petula Clark", decided to end the relationship, although they remained on friendly terms. Their professional relationship continued for a few years, culminating in the 1959 BBC Radio series Pet and Mr Piano, which was the last time they worked together. In 1962, Henderson penned a ballad about their break-up, called "There's Nothing More To Say", for Clark's LP In Other Words. In 1967, in Las Vegas, she was a witness at the wedding of her friend, French singer Charles Aznavour, alongside Sammy Davis Jr.

In October 1957, Clark was invited to appear at the Paris Olympia for Europe's premier live radio show, Musicorama. The next day, she was invited to the office of Vogue Records' chairman Léon Cabat to discuss recording in French and working in France. There she met her future husband, publicist Claude Wolff (born 6 January 1931), to whom she was attracted immediately, when she was told that he would work with her if she recorded in French, she agreed. They were married in June 1961 and have two daughters and a son. They also have two adult grandchildren. Clark has expressed regret about not being closer to her children when they were younger, as her busy schedule kept her away. In 2013, Clark stated that she and Wolff were "not in a romantic relationship anymore". Wolff died on 20 March 2024 at the age 93.

Following the 1979 UK general election, in which Margaret Thatcher won a majority for the Conservatives, becoming Britain's first female prime minister, Clark sent Thatcher a congratulatory telegram, saying, "Felicitations – so happy for you and for Britain." The same year, Clark performed at a Young Conservatives rally. In 2002, she attended a fundraiser for Labour prime minister Tony Blair.

Since the 1960s, Clark has called Geneva, Switzerland home. She also has a holiday chalet in the French Alps, where she likes to ski, and a pied-à-terre in London's Chelsea.

== Filmography ==
- Medal for the General (1944)
- Strawberry Roan (1945)
- Murder in Reverse (1945)
- I Know Where I'm Going! (1945)
- Trouble at Townsend (1946)
- London Town (1946)
- Vice Versa (1948)
- Easy Money (1948)
- Here Come the Huggetts (1948)
- Vote for Huggett (1949)
- The Huggetts Abroad (1949)
- Don't Ever Leave Me (1949)
- The Romantic Age (1949)
- Dance Hall (1950)
- White Corridors (1951)
- Madame Louise (1951)
- The Card (1952)
- Made in Heaven (1952)
- The Runaway Bus (1954)
- The Gay Dog (1954)
- The Happiness of Three Women (1954)
- Track the Man Down (1955)
- That Woman Opposite (1957)
- 6.5 Special (1958) (as herself)
- À Couteaux Tirés (1964) (also composed score) (aka Daggers Drawn for the American release)
- Finian's Rainbow (1968)
- Goodbye, Mr. Chips (1969)
- Drôles de zèbres (1977)
- Never Never Land (1980)
- Sans famille (1981, French mini-series)

== Noteworthy recordings ==
=== French singles ===
- "Prends mon cœur" ("A Fool Such as I") (1960, No.9)
- "Garde-moi la dernière danse (Save the Last Dance for Me)" (1961, No.3)
- "Marin (Sailor)" (1961, No.2)
- "Roméo" (1961, No.3)
- "Ya Ya Twist" (1962, with Johnny Hallyday, No.1)
- "Chariot" (later also known as "I Will Follow Him") (1962, No.1)
- "Les Beaux Jours" (original title: "Ramblin' Rose") (1963)
- "Cœur blessé" (original title: "Torture" by John D. Loudermilk; lyric by Jean Kluger, Daniel Vangarde, Claude Carrere, Jean Broussolle) (1963, No.4)
- "Je me sens bien auprès de toi (Dance On)" (1963, No.5)
- "Ceux qui ont un cœur (Anyone Who Had a Heart)" (1964, No.11)
- "Dans le temps (Downtown)" (1965, No.6)
- "Un jeune homme bien (A Well Respected Man)" (1965)
- "C'est ma chanson" ("This is My Song") (1967, No.1)
- "La Dernière Valse (The Last Waltz)" (1967, No.2)
- "Tout le monde veut aller au ciel" (1967)

=== German singles ===
- "Monsieur" (by Karl Götz, Kurt Hertha; German language song) (1962, No.1)
- "Casanova Baciami" (song with German lyric) (1963, No.2)
- "Cheerio" (German language version of "Chariot") (1963, No.6)
- "Mille Mille Grazie" (song with mainly German lyric) (1963, No.9)
- "Warum muß man auseinandergeh'n (Mit weißen Perlen)" (1964, No.17)
- "Alles ist nun vorbei (Anyone Who Had a Heart)" (1964, No.37)
- "Downtown" (1965, German version, No.1)
- "Kann ich dir vertrauen" (1966, No.17)
- "Verzeih' die dummen Tränen" (1966, German version of "My Love", No.21)
- "Love – so heißt mein Song" (1967, German version of "This is My Song", No.23)
- "Alle Leute wollen in den Himmel", (1967, German version of "Tout le monde veut aller au ciel", No.28)

=== Italian singles ===
- "Monsieur" (the German song with Italian lyrics by Vito Pallavicini) (1962, No.1)
- "Sul mio carro (Chariot)" (1962, No.1)
- "Quelli che hanno un cuore (Anyone who had a heart)" (1964, No.4)
- "Invece no" (Entry at the San Remo Festival 1965, No.5)
- "Ciao, ciao (Downtown)", (1965, No.1)
- "Cara felicità (This is my song)" (1967, No.1)
- "Kiss Me Goodbye (Italian version)" (1968, No.26)

=== Complete Spanish recordings ===
- "Qué tal, Dolly? (Hello, Dolly!)"
- "Pequeña Flor (Petite Fleur)"
- "Tú no tienes corazón (Anyone Who Had a Heart)"
- "Cantando al caminar (The Road)"

All four songs were released in 1964 in Spain on Hispavox EP "Petula Clark canta en Español" (Cat.-No. HV 27–126).

=== Other noteworthy recordings ===
- "Put Your Shoes on Lucy" (1949)
- "House in the Sky" (1949)
- "I'll Always Love You" (1949)
- "Clancy Lowered the Boom" (1949)
- "You Go to My Head" (1950)
- "Music! Music! Music!" (1950)
- "You Are My True Love" (1950)
- "May Kway (Rose, Rose I Love You)" (1951)
- "Mariandl" (with Jimmy Young) (1951)
- "Where Did My Snowman Go?" (1952)
- "The Card" (1952)
- "Christopher Robin at Buckingham Palace" (1953)
- "Meet Me in Battersea Park" (1954)
- "Suddenly There's a Valley" (1955)
- "Another Door Opens" (1956)
- "With All My Heart" (1957)
- "Fibbin'" (1958)
- "Devotion" (1958)
- "Dear Daddy" (1959)
- "Mama's Talkin' Soft" (1959), a song deleted from Gypsy prior to its Broadway opening
- "Cinderella Jones" (1960)
- "Marin" ("Sailor") (1961)
- "La Nuit N'en Finit Plus" ("Needles And Pins") (1963)
- "Ceux qui ont un cœur" ("Anyone Who Had a Heart") (1964)
- "Petite Fleur" (1964)
- "Invece no" (1965)
- "Dans le temps" ("Downtown") (1965)
- "The World Song" (1971)
- "Sauve-moi" (1977)
- "C'est si bon" (1978) (with Mireille Mathieu)
- "Fred and Marguerite" (1980) (from Captain Beaky and His Band)
- "The Bumble Bee" (1980) (from Captain Beaky and His Band)
- "Mr. Orwell" (1984)
- Blood Brothers (International Recording) (1995)
- Songs from Sunset Boulevard (1996)
- Here for You (1998)
- The Ultimate Collection (2002)
- Kaleidoscope (2003)
- "Starting All Over Again" (2003)
- Live at the Paris Olympia (2004)
- "Driven by Emotion" (2005)
- "Memphis" (2005)
- "Together" (2006), recorded as a duet with Andy Williams
- "Thank You for Christmas" (2006)
- "Simple Gifts" (2006)
- "It Had to Be You" (2007)
- Duets (2007)
- Solitude and Sunshine (2007)
- In Her Own Write (2007), also featuring a guest recording by Amanda-Jane Manning of "My Love Will Never Die"
- Then & Now (2008)
- Open Your Heart: A Love Song Collection (2009)
- This is Christmas (2009)

== See also ==
- List of best-selling music artists
