= Eric Winstone =

English bandleader (1913–1974)

- Born: Eric Henry Winstone; 1 January 1913; London, England
- Died: 5 February 1974 (aged 61) Pagham, Sussex
- Genres: easy listening, pop
- Occupations: Bandleader, conductor, composer
- Instruments: Piano, accordion
- Years active: 1930s - 1970s

Eric Henry Winstone (1 January 1913 – 2 May 1974) was an English big band leader, conductor and composer.

== Biography and career ==
Playing piano in his spare time from a job as Westminster Gas and Coke Company led him to form his first band in 1935.

During World War II his orchestra entertained the forces, and performed at holiday camps after the war. In 1955 a CinemaScope short of The Eric Winstone Bandshow was made.

He was quoted in 1955 as saying that

With the exception of money, length of working hours, living and working conditions, the price of beer, and the opposite sex, a musician is completely unconcerned about the material things of life.

His limited company, Eric Winstone Orchestras Ltd., was involved in a widely reported court case involving Diana Dors in 1957. Dors had been engaged to appear with the orchestra at a charity matinee in July 1954 for the RAF Association in Clacton, where Winstone's orchestra was playing a season at Butlins holiday camp. She failed to fulfil the singing commitment, which was to take place in a cinema, due to having a septic throat. She claimed that the illness had been notified to the company. The company argued that she was fulfilling her film commitments and therefore the illness was an excuse, and furthermore that being unable to sing was not the issue at stake as merely saying "hello" would have sufficed. Winstone remarked to the audience that she was not a woman of her word, did not respect her obligations and considered the people of Clacton to be unworthy of her talents, He thereafter told a newspaper journalist that she had let him down. Winstone's company sued for breach of contract and this caused Dors to counter-sue for slander, the outcome of which was that the company was awarded £5 compensation and Dors received 100 guineas. The judge in the case said that the company's financial loss had been non-existent, having heard that it was to receive £210 for the performance and a further £40 if all the seats were sold. Dors, who was to receive £80 for her fifteen-minute appearance, donated her court award to the charity. Her husband had said in court that the need for a court's ruling (by which he was referring to the company's claim) was "a waste of time".

== Personal life ==
Winstone had a somewhat tempestuous personal life at times. In September 1959 he obtained a court order that banned his mother-in-law from staying at his home. In the same month a court ordered that an "iron curtain" be constructed in the property so as to split the rooms between himself, then aged 46, and his wife and two-year-old daughter. He was also ordered to stop playing his piano by 6pm each day in order not to disturb his family. At that time he was using it to compose arrangements for three bands and five radio shows. Four months later, his then 26-year-old wife, Myrtle Shepherd, a former fashion model, was seeking a judicial separation. They had married on 25 February 1957.

== Discography ==
- Rumbas & Sambas (EP) - Eric Winstone And Los Chicos 1967
