= Robin Richmond (organist) =

English cinema organist and BBC Radio presenter (1912–1998)

- Born: Robert Athol Stephenson Richmond; 21 April 1912; London, England
- Died: 27 July 1998 (aged 86); Sussex, England
- Education: Westminster School
- Occupations: Organist, broadcaster

Robert Athol Stephenson Richmond (21 April 1912 – 27 July 1998) was an English cinema organist and BBC Radio presenter and performer.

== Early life ==
Richmond was born on 21 April 1912 in Kensington, London, England, UK. His father William Stephenson Richmond was a doctor, and his mother was Barbara Hamilton Archibald. He had a brother, John Whitaker Stephenson Richmond. Robin was educated at Westminster School and London University to study law, though he failed to graduate from the latter. It was at Westminster School where he learned how to play the organ.

== Career ==
After a brief engagement at Lambeth Mission Hall, from which he was sacked for adding percussion sounds to hymns, he made his West End debut in the revue It's in the Bag. He then toured with the comedy singing duo The Two Leslies (Leslie Sarony and Leslie Holmes). His BBC Radio debut was in Palace of Varieties in 1938.

His trademark instrument became the Hammond organ, after he imported the first example to Great Britain from the United States in 1935. It carried the serial number "001". Richmond volunteered for the Navy during World War II but was rejected for health reasons. He began the war as organist at the Paramount Cinema in Tottenham Court Road, London, with the singer Adelaide Hall. However, the cinema was bombed soon after Richmond's joining. He appeared extensively on BBC radio. Richmond was known as one of the first "swing-timers", playing mainly works that were the latest songs and dances in the U.S.

In 1944 Richmond was an actor as well as a writer for Rainbow Round the Corner, in 1949 the Mystery at the Burlesque, and The Time of His Life in 1955.

Post-war, Richmond regularly performed on the BBC Light Programme, on shows such as Music While You Work, Variety Bandbox and Organ Grinder Swing. He also presented a number of programmes including Housewives' Choice and Jazz Club. On television, he was the resident organist on the quiz show Double Your Money.

He created the BBC Radio 2 series The Organist Entertains in 1969, and was its main presenter until 1980, often at the BBC Theatre Organ in Manchester. A special edition in 2012 marked the centenary of his birth. He appeared as a castaway on the BBC Radio programme Desert Island Discs on 10 September 1977.

== Personal life and death ==
Richmond died of cancer in Westminster, London, on 26 July 1998, aged 86.
