= Harry Bidgood =

English bandleader (1898–1957)

- Also known as: Primo Scala
- Born: Henry James Barnard; 28 August 1898; West Ham, London, England
- Died: 15 November 1957 (aged 59) London, England
- Genres: Jazz, British dance band
- Occupation: Bandleader
- Instrument: Accordion
- Labels: Broadcast Records, Rex, Imperial, Decca

Henry Bidgood (28 August 1898 – 15 November 1957) was an English composer, dance band leader and musical director for films.

Born in West Ham, London, England in 1898, his father was music teacher and composer Thomas Bidgood. The family moved to Harringay in North London when Thomas was about 10 years old. He studied at the Royal College of Music. In the 1920s Bidgood was the assistant organist at the Electric Coliseum in Harringay.

Bidgood released dance band music under various names, mostly notably Primo Scala and his Accordion Band, who issued over 200 sides on 78 rpm. Over the course of 20 years, he would frequently broadcast on the BBC. In 1930, he and his band covered "Amy, Wonderful Amy", a song about Amy Johnson. Bidgood was also the musical director for numerous films, including several starring George Formby. Apart from the many recordings made under his own name, he also led accordion bands under the names Rossini and Don Porto. As Primo Scala, he broadcast regularly on Music While You Work, until just before his death. Many of these sessions were directed by deputies, such as Ernest Penfold, owing to Bidgood being in and out of hospital.

He died in November 1957, at the age of 59, having been diagnosed with inoperable stomach cancer.
