= Frank Chacksfield =

English conductor (1914–1995)

Background information
- Born: Francis Charles Chacksfield; 9 May 1914; Battle, Sussex, England
- Died: 9 June 1995 (aged 81) Kent, England
- Genres: Easy listening; pop
- Occupations: Bandleader, conductor, composer
- Instruments: Piano; organ
- Years active: c.1938–1991
- Labels: Decca; Phase 4; Starborne Productions

Francis Charles Chacksfield (9 May 1914 – 9 June 1995) was an English pianist, organist, composer, arranger, and conductor of popular light orchestral easy listening music, who had great success in Britain and internationally in the 1950s and early 1960s.

== Life and career ==
Chacksfield was born in Battle, East Sussex, and as a child learned to play the piano and organ. His organ teacher was J. R. Sheehan-Dare (1857–1934). He had appeared at Hastings Music Festivals by the time he was 14, and then became deputy church organist at Salehurst. After working for a short period in a solicitor's office he decided on a career in music, and by the late 1930s, led a small band at Tonbridge in Kent. At the beginning of World War II, he joined the Royal Army Service Corps, and, following a radio broadcast as a pianist, was posted to ENSA at Salisbury where he became the arranger for Stars in Battledress, an armed forces entertainment troupe, and shared an office with comedian Charlie Chester.

After the war, he worked with Chester and on BBC Radio as an arranger and conductor. He also worked as musical director for both Henry Hall and Geraldo, and began recording under his own name in 1951 as "Frank Chacksfield's Tunesmiths". In early 1953, he had his first top ten hit, "Little Red Monkey", on the Parlophone label. This was a novelty recording featuring Jack Jordan on the clavioline, and reportedly the first record featuring an electronic instrument to feature on the UK singles chart.

Chacksfield signed a recording contract with Decca Records in 1953, and formed a 40-piece orchestra with a large string section, the "Singing Strings". His first record release for Decca, Charlie Chaplin's theme for his film Limelight, won him a gold disc in the United States, and in the United Kingdom, where it reached No. 2 in the UK Singles Chart, and won him the NME award as 'Record of the Year'. It spent eight weeks at No. 2 (an all-time UK chart record), and in all thirteen weeks in the top five chart positions, without dislodging Frankie Laine's "I Believe". His next 78 single, "Ebb Tide", became the first British instrumental recording to reach No. 1 in the United States, spending 5 weeks on top of the Your Hit Parade chart from November 1953 to January 1954 (including Christmas week), also providing him with a second gold disc, and he was voted the most promising new orchestra of the year in the US. Both of these hits used arrangements by Leon Young.

He became one of Britain's best known orchestra leaders internationally, and is estimated to have sold more than 20 million albums worldwide. His material was "mood music", similar to that of Mantovani, including ballads, waltzes, and film themes. In 1954, he began presenting a series on BBC TV, which continued occasionally until the early 1960s. Chacksfield was responsible for the musical arrangement of the first UK entry into the Eurovision Song Contest 1957; "All" by Patricia Bredin. He continued to write music, release singles and albums through the 1950s and 1960s, and appeared regularly on BBC radio.

He continued to record occasionally until the 1990s, from the 1970s primarily on the Phase 4 label. He also developed business interests in publishing and recorded for Starborne Productions, a company supplying "canned music" for use by easy listening radio stations and others. Many of these recordings were made commercially available in 2007. Many of his recordings were used during Test card and Ceefax intervals on BBC1 and BBC2 during the 1980s and 1990s. His last album was Thanks for the Memories (Academy Award Winners 1934–55), released in 1991. Chacksfield died in Kent in 1995, after having suffered for several years from Parkinson's disease.

The main theme from his Latin-American style track "Cuban Boy", composed by Federico Moreno Torroba, was used as the theme music for the BBC Scotland sitcom Still Game.

From the album All Time Top T.V. Themes (Decca PFS 4087, 1966; also as The Great TV Themes on London SP 44077), several tracks were used by Dutch offshore pirate radio station Radio Veronica in the 1960s. "Rawhide" and "Dragnet" were used in the news jingles; "The Alfred Hitchcock Theme" was also used.

== Discography (selected) ==
=== Albums ===
- Presenting Frank Chacksfield and his Orchestra, Michael LL 1041
- Ebb Tide, London LL 1408, No. 36 US
- Velvet, London LL 1443
- Love Letters in the Sand, London LL 3027
- Hollywood Almanac, London LL 3102/3
- On the Beach, London LL 3158
- Evening in Paris, Decca LK 4081
- The Music of Noel Coward, Decca LK 4090
- Evening in Rome, Decca LK 4095
- The Music of George Gershwin, Decca LK 4113
- If I Had a Talking Picture of You, Decca LK 4135
- Close Your Eyes, Decca LK 4138
- Broadway Melody, Decca LK 4151
- Mediterranean Moonlight, Decca LK 4168
- South Sea Island Magic, Decca LK 4174
- In the Mystic East, Decca LK 4231
- Academy Award Songs Vol. 1 (1934–1945), Decca LK 4302
- Academy Award Songs Vol. 2 (1946–1957), Decca LK 4311
- Glamorous Holiday, Decca SKL 4016
- Immortal Serenades, Decca SKL 4018
- Evening in London, Decca SKL 4057
- Music for Christmas, Decca SKL 4069
- The Million Sellers, Decca SKL 4072
- Opera's Golden Moments, London Phase 4 21092
- The New Ebb Tide, London Phase 4 44053, No. 120 US
- Globe-Trotting, London Phase 4 SP 44059
- The New Limelight, London Phase 4 SP 44066
- Hawaii, London Phase 4 SP 44087
- Foreign Film Festival, London Phase 4 SP 44112
- New York, London Phase 4 SP 44141
- Beatles Songbook, London Phase 4 44142
- Simon & Garfunkel & Jimmy Webb, London Phase 4 44151
- Plays Bacharach, London Phase 4 44158
- Plays Ebb Tide and Other Million Sellers, London Phase 4 44168
- Chacksfield Plays Rodgers & Hart, London Phase 4 SP 44223
- The Glory That Was Gershwin, London Phase 4 44254
- Plays Hoagy Carmichael, London Phase 4 44275
- TV's Golden Hits, Compleat Records 671020-1

A number of the Decca/London Phase 4 titles have been reissued on CD by Dutton Vocalion.

=== Singles ===
Year	Single	Peak chart positions	
Year	Single	US	UK
1953	"Little Red Monkey"	—	10
1953	"Terry's Theme from Limelight"	5	2
1953	"Ebb Tide"	2	9
1956	"In Old Lisbon"	—	15
1956	"Port au Prince" (with Winifred Atwell)	—	18
1956	"Donkey Cart"	—	26
1960	"On the Beach"	47	—
