= Nixa Records =

Nixa Record Company Ltd. was founded in 1950 by Hilton Nixon. Nixa was the second company, after Decca, to release LP records in Britain (at the time, EMI was attempting to promote 45 rpm records over 33 LP records). The record label, which traded as Nixa Records, was acquired by Pye Records in 1953.

Nixon's stepson, John M. Reid (then also known as Nixon), was manager from 1950 until the company was sold to Pye in 1953. Nixa Records was set up principally to market the catalogue of Compagnie Générale du Disque, Paris, in Commonwealth of Nations countries. The artists included Dany Dauberson, André Claveau, and other continental cabaret and jazz artists. The shellac records were pressed for Nixa by the Decca Record Company. Later, Nixa made licensing arrangements with a number of US classical music record companies, including Westminster Records, Period Records, Concert Hall Records, Haydn Society and Vanguard Records, to manufacture and market their catalogues in the UK and British Commonwealth. Nixa also made original recordings in England at the Walthamstow Assembly Hall of Sir Adrian Boult conducting Holst's The Planets Suite, Vaughan Williams' English Folk Song Suite, and others.

Their primary artist was Petula Clark, who recorded for the label in both English and French from 1955 to 1962. Many of her releases for the label were top ten hits in both the UK and France, with three of them charting at number one.

In 1987, the Nixa name was used again as a classical imprint by PRT Records.

== See also ==
- List of record labels
