= Ray Conniff discography =

This is the discography of American bandleader and arranger Ray Conniff.

== Albums ==
=== 1950s ===
| Year | Album | Peak positions | | | | | Label |
| Year | Album | US 200 | US CB | GER MCC | NOR VG | UK OCC | Label |
|---|---|---|---|---|---|---|---|
| 1956 | 'S Wonderful! | 11 | 12 | — | — | — | Capitol |
| 1957 | Dance the Bop! | — | 20 | — | — | — | Capitol |
| 1957 | 'S Marvelous | 10 | 7 | — | — | — | Capitol |
| 1958 | 'S Awful Nice | 9 | 28 | — | — | 13 | Capitol |
| 1958 | Concert in Rhythm, Vol.1 | 9 | 4 | — | — | — | Capitol |
| 1958 | Broadway in Rhythm | 10 | 11 | 37 | — | — | Capitol |
| 1958 | Hollywood in Rhythm | 29 | 7 | — | — | — | Capitol |
| 1959 | It's the Talk of the Town | 8 | 9 | — | — | 15 | Capitol |
| 1959 | Christmas with Conniff | 14 | 34 | — | — | — | Capitol |
| 1959 | Concert in Rhythm, Vol.2 | 13 | 12 | — | — | — | Capitol |
"—" denotes a recording that did not chart or was not released in that territory.

=== 1960s ===
| Year | Album | Peak positions | | | | | Label |
| Year | Album | US 200 | US CB | GER MCC | NOR VG | UK OCC | Label |
|---|---|---|---|---|---|---|---|
| 1960 | Young at Heart | 6 | 10 | — | — | — | Capitol |
| 1960 | Say It with Music (A Touch of Latin) | 4 | 10 | — | — | — | Capitol |
| 1961 | Memories Are Made of This | 4 | 8 | — | — | 14 | Capitol |
| 1961 | Somebody Loves Me | 14 | 12 | 8 | — | — | Capitol |
| 1962 | So Much in Love | 4 | 8 | — | — | — | Capitol |
| 1962 | 'S Continental | 6 | 8 | 12 | — | — | Capitol |
| 1962 | Rhapsody in Rhythm | 28 | 13 | — | — | — | Capitol |
| 1962 | We Wish You a Merry Christmas | 32 | 32 | — | — | 12 | Capitol |
| 1963 | The Happy Beat of Ray Conniff, His Orchestra and Chorus | 20 | 15 | 7 | — | — | Capitol |
| 1963 | You Make Me Feel So Young | 73 | 26 | — | — | — | Capitol |
| 1963 | Speak to Me of Love | 50 | 34 | — | — | — | Capitol |
| 1964 | Invisible Tears | 23 | 11 | 24 | — | — | Capitol |
| 1965 | Friendly Persuasion | 141 | 70 | — | — | — | Capitol |
| 1965 | Music From 'Mary Poppins', 'The Sound of Music', 'My Fair Lady' & Other Great Movie Themes | 34 | 47 | — | — | — | Capitol |
| 1965 | Love Affair | 54 | 53 | 12 | — | — | Capitol |
| 1965 | Happiness Is | 80 | 83 | 20 | — | — | Capitol |
| 1966 | Somewhere My Love and Other Great Hits | 3 | 3 | 11 | 3 | 34 | Capitol |
| 1966 | Ray Conniff's World of Hits | 78 | 51 | — | — | — | Capitol |
| 1966 | En Español (The Ray Conniff Singers Sing It in Spanish) | 180 | — | — | — | — | Capitol |
| 1967 | This Is My Song | 30 | 25 | 25 | 4 | — | Capitol |
| 1967 | Ray Conniff's Hawaiian Album | 39 | 47 | — | — | — | Capitol |
| 1967 | It Must Be Him | 25 | 46 | 28 | 16 | — | Capitol |
| 1968 | Honey | 22 | 27 | 17 | 14 | — | Capitol |
| 1968 | Turn Around Look at Me | 70 | — | — | — | — | Capitol |
| 1969 | I Love How You Love Me | 101 | 78 | — | — | — | Capitol |
| 1969 | Ray Conniff's Greatest Hits | 158 | — | — | — | — | Capitol |
| 1969 | Jean | 103 | — | — | — | — | Capitol |

=== 1970s ===
| Year | Album | Peak positions | | | | | Label |
| Year | Album | US 200 | US CB | GER MCC | AUS KMT | UK OCC | Label |
|---|---|---|---|---|---|---|---|
| 1970 | Bridge Over Troubled Water | 47 | 66 | — | — | 30 | |
| 1970 | Concert In Stereo: Live at 'The Sahara Tahoe' | 177 | — | — | — | — | |
| 1970 | Live Europa Tournee 1969/Concert in Stereo | — | — | — | — | — | |
| 1970 | We've Only Just Begun | 120 | 98 | — | — | — | |
| 1971 | Love Story | 98 | 101 | — | — | 34 | |
| 1971 | Great Contemporary Instrumental Hits | 177 | 106 | — | — | — | |
| 1971 | I'd Like to Teach the World to Sing | 138 | 73 | — | — | 17 | |
| 1972 | Love Theme from 'The Godfather' | 114 | 92 | — | — | — | |
| 1972 | Alone Again (Naturally) | 180 | — | — | — | — | |
| 1973 | I Can See Clearly Now (aka Clair) | 165 | — | — | — | 39 | |
| 1973 | Ray Conniff in Britain | — | — | — | — | — | |
| 1973 | You Are the Sunshine of My Life | 176 | 139 | — | 41 | — | |
| 1973 | Harmony | 194 | — | — | 61 | — | |
| 1973 | The Way We Were | — | — | — | — | — | |
| 1974 | Ray Conniff Plays Carpenters | — | — | — | — | — | |
| 1974 | The Happy Sound of Ray Conniff | — | — | — | — | — | |
| 1974 | Ray Conniff in Moscow | — | — | — | — | — | |
| 1975 | Laughter in the Rain | — | — | — | — | — | |
| 1975 | Another Somebody Done Somebody Wrong Song | — | — | — | — | — | |
| 1975 | Love Will Keep Us Together | — | — | — | — | — | |
| 1975 | Ray Conniff Plays The Beatles | — | — | — | — | — | |
| 1975 | I Write the Songs | — | — | — | — | — | |
| 1975 | Live in Japan | — | — | — | — | — | |
| 1976 | Send in the Clowns | — | — | — | — | — | |
| 1976 | Theme from 'SWAT' and Other TV Themes | — | — | — | — | — | |
| 1976 | After the Lovin'' | — | — | — | — | — | |
| 1976 | Exitos Latinos | — | — | — | — | — | |
| 1978 | Ray Conniff Plays the Bee Gees and Other Great Hits | — | — | — | — | — | |
| 1979 | I Will Survive | — | — | — | — | — | |
| 1979 | Moon River | — | — | 11 | — | — | |

=== 1980s ownwards ===
| Year | Album | Peak positions | | | | | Label |
| Year | Album | US 200 | US CB | GER MCC | AUS KMT | UK OCC | Label |
|---|---|---|---|---|---|---|---|
| 1980 | The Perfect '10' Classics | — | — | — | — | — | |
| 1980 | Exclusivamente Latino | — | — | — | — | — | |
| 1981 | Siempre Latino | — | — | — | — | — | |
| 1982 | The Nashville Connection | — | — | — | — | — | |
| 1982 | Musik für Millionen | — | — | — | — | — | |
| 1982 | Amor Amor | — | — | — | — | — | |
| 1982 | Fantastico | — | — | — | — | — | |
| 1984 | Supersonico | — | — | — | — | — | |
| 1984 | Christmas Caroling | — | — | — | — | — | |
| 1985 | Campeones | — | — | — | — | — | |
| 1986 | Say You Say Me | — | — | — | — | — | |
| 1986 | 30th Anniversary Edition | — | — | — | — | — | |
| 1987 | Always in My Heart | — | — | — | — | — | |
| 1988 | Interpreta 16 Exitos De Manuel Alejandro | — | — | — | — | — | |
| 1990 | Ray Conniff Plays Broadway | — | — | — | — | — | |
| 1991 | 'S Always Conniff | — | — | — | — | — | |
| 1993 | Latinisimo | — | — | — | — | — | |
| 1995 | 40th Anniversary | — | — | — | — | — | |
| 1997 | Live in Rio (aka Mi Historia) | — | — | — | — | — | |
| 1997 | I Love Movies | — | — | — | — | — | |
| 1998 | My Way | — | — | — | — | — | |
| 1999 | 'S Country | — | — | — | — | — | |
| 1999 | 'S Christmas | — | — | — | — | — | |
| 2000 | Do Ray Para O Rei | — | — | — | — | — | |

=== As a collaborative artist ===
List of albums, with selected chart positions, showing other relevant details
| Title | Album details | Peak chart positions | |
| Title | Album details | US 200 | US CB |
|---|---|---|---|
| Conniff Meets Butterfield (with Billy Butterfield) | Released: 1959; Label: Columbia; Formats: LP | 8 | 13 |
| Just Kiddin' Around (with Billy Butterfield) | Released: 1962; Label: Columbia; Formats: LP | 85 | 33 |

== Hit records ==
| Year | Single | Chart positions | | |
| Year | Single | US | US AC | CB |
|---|---|---|---|---|
| 1957 | "''S Wonderful" | 73 | — | — |
| 1960 | "Midnight Lace-Part 1" | 92 | — | 89 |
| 1964 | "Blue Moon" | 119 | — | — |
| 1964 | "Invisible Tears" | 57 | 10 | 50 |
| 1964 | "If I Knew Then" | 126 | — | — |
| 1965 | "Happiness Is" | — | 26 | — |
| 1966 | "Somewhere My Love" | 9 | 1 | 11 |
| 1966 | "Lookin' For Love" | 94 | 2 | — |
| 1967 | "Wednesday's Child" | — | 29 | — |
| 1967 | "Cabaret" | 118 | 13 | — |
| 1967 | "'17'" | — | 15 | — |
| 1967 | "Wonderful Season of Summer" | — | 14 | — |
| 1967 | "Moonlight Brings Memories" | — | 24 | — |
| 1967 | "One Paddle, Two Paddle" | — | 25 | — |
| 1968 | "Winds of Change" | — | 7 | — |
| 1968 | "We're a Home" | — | 23 | — |
| 1968 | "Sounds of Silence" | — | 34 | — |
| 1968 | "Look Homeward Angel" | — | 12 | — |
| 1969 | "I've Got My Eyes On You" | — | 23 | — |
| 1971 | "Loss of Love" | — | 35 | — |
| 1973 | "Harmony" | — | 23 | — |
| 1977 | "Rain On" | — | 48 | — |

== Holiday 100 chart entries ==
Since many radio stations in the US adopt a format change to Christmas music each December, many holiday hits have an annual spike in popularity during the last few weeks of the year and are retired once the season is over. In December 2011, Billboard began a Holiday Songs chart with 50 positions that monitors the last five weeks of each year to "rank the top holiday hits of all eras using the same methodology as the Hot 100, blending streaming, airplay, and sales data", and in 2013 the number of positions on the chart was doubled, resulting in the Holiday 100. Two recordings by Conniff and The Singers have made appearances on the Holiday 100 and are noted below according to the holiday season in which they charted there.

| Title | Holiday season peak chart positions | | | | | | Album |
| Title | 2015 | 2017 | 2018 | 2019 | 2021 | 2022 | Album |
|---|---|---|---|---|---|---|---|
| "Ring Christmas Bells" | 60 | 92 | 97 | 84 | — | 92 | We Wish You a Merry Christmas |
| "The Twelve Days of Christmas" | — | — | 49 | 63 | 83 | — | We Wish You a Merry Christmas |
