= We Wish You a Merry Christmas (disambiguation) =

"We Wish You a Merry Christmas" is a popular secular English carol from the West Country of England.

We Wish You a Merry Christmas may also refer to:

- We Wish You a Merry Christmas (Ray Conniff album), 1962
- We Wish You a Merry Christmas (Take 6 album), 1999
- We Wish You a Merry Christmas, a 2009 Wii game

== See also ==
- We Wish You a Metal Xmas and a Headbanging New Year
