= Happiness Is (Ray Conniff album) =

Studio album by The Ray Conniff Orchestra and Chorus
- Released: March 1966
- Genre: Easy listening
- Label: Columbia
- Producer: Ernie Altschuler

The Ray Conniff Orchestra and Chorus chronology
Love Affair (1965)	Happiness Is (1966)	Somewhere My Love (1966)

Happiness Is is a 1966 LP by The Ray Conniff Orchestra and Chorus.

== Overview ==
The title track, and single, "Happiness Is" is a song written by Paul Parnes and Paul Evans, a modified version of the song was later used for four years as an advertising jingle for Kent cigarettes.

The album peaked at No. 80 on the Billboard Top LPs, and stayed on the chart for 9 weeks.

== Track listing ==
1. "Happiness Is" (Paul Evans, Paul Parnes)
2. "Midnight Lace", Pt. 1 (Joe Lubin)
3. "Miss You" (Charles Tobias, Harry Tobias)
4. "Popsy" (Douglas James/Mark Hill/J. Proctor)
5. "Melodie d'Amour" (Leonardo Johns, Henri Salvador)
6. "You Stepped Out of a Dream" (Nacio Herb Brown, Gus Kahn)
7. "Jamaica Farewell" (Lord Burgess)
8. "Blue Moon" (Richard Rodgers, Lorenz Hart)
9. "If I Knew Then" (Charles Tobias, Harry Tobias)
10. "The Sheik of Araby" (Harry B. Smith, Ted Snyder, Francis Wheeler)
11. "All by Myself" (Irving Berlin)
12. "Sweet Sue, Just You" (Will J. Harris and Victor Young)

== Personnel ==
- Ray Conniff – arranger, conductor, trombone and whistle solos
- The Ray Conniff Singers – vocals
- The Ray Conniff Orchestra – instrumentation
- Billy Butterfield – trumpet solo

== Charts ==
Chart (1966)	Peak position
US Billboard Top LPs	80
