= Here We Come A-Caroling (Ray Conniff album) =

- CD reissue with second cover

Studio album by Ray Conniff
- Released: 1965
- Genre: Pop, easy listening
- Length: 30:21
- Language: English
- Label: Columbia
- Producer: Ray Conniff

Ray Conniff chronology
We Wish You a Merry Christmas (1962)	Here We Come A-Caroling (1965)	Christmas Caroling (1984)

Here We Come A-Caroling is a 1965 album by Ray Conniff. It was recorded in Los Angeles, California, from July 21–23, 1965. The album reached No. 15 on Billboard's holiday season Best Bets for Christmas albums chart on December 3, 1966.

In the late 1960s, the album was reissued with the title Ray Conniff's Christmas Album: Here We Come A-Caroling and featured a new album cover.

== Track listing ==
International edition
No.	Title	Writer(s)	Length
1.	"Here We Come A-Caroling"	Traditional	2:30
2.	"Silent Night, Holy Night"	Joseph Mohr	2:49
3.	"God Rest Ye Merry, Gentlemen"	Traditional	2:44
4.	"Away in a Manger"	Martin Luther	2:13
5.	"Joy to the World"	Isaac Watts	2:14
6.	"Adoramus Te"	Traditional	2:23
7.	"The Real Meaning of Christmas"	Ray Conniff	2:09
8.	"Go Tell It on the Mountain"	John Wesley Work Jr.	2:01
9.	"What Child Is This?"	William Chatterton Dix	3:30
10.	"O Tannenbaum"	Traditional	2:10
11.	"It Came Upon the Midnight Clear"	Edmund Sears	2:46
12.	"O Little Town of Bethlehem"	Phillips Brooks	2:52

== Charts ==
Chart (1965)	Peak position
US Best Bets for Christmas: Christmas LP's (Billboard)	15
