= Remember (Irving Berlin song) =

1925 song by Irving Berlin

Single by Jean Goldkette and His Orchestra
- A-side: "I Want to See My Tennessee"
- Published: 1925
- Released: 1925
- Recorded: November 24, 1924
- Genre: Traditional pop
- Label: Victor
- Songwriter: Irving Berlin

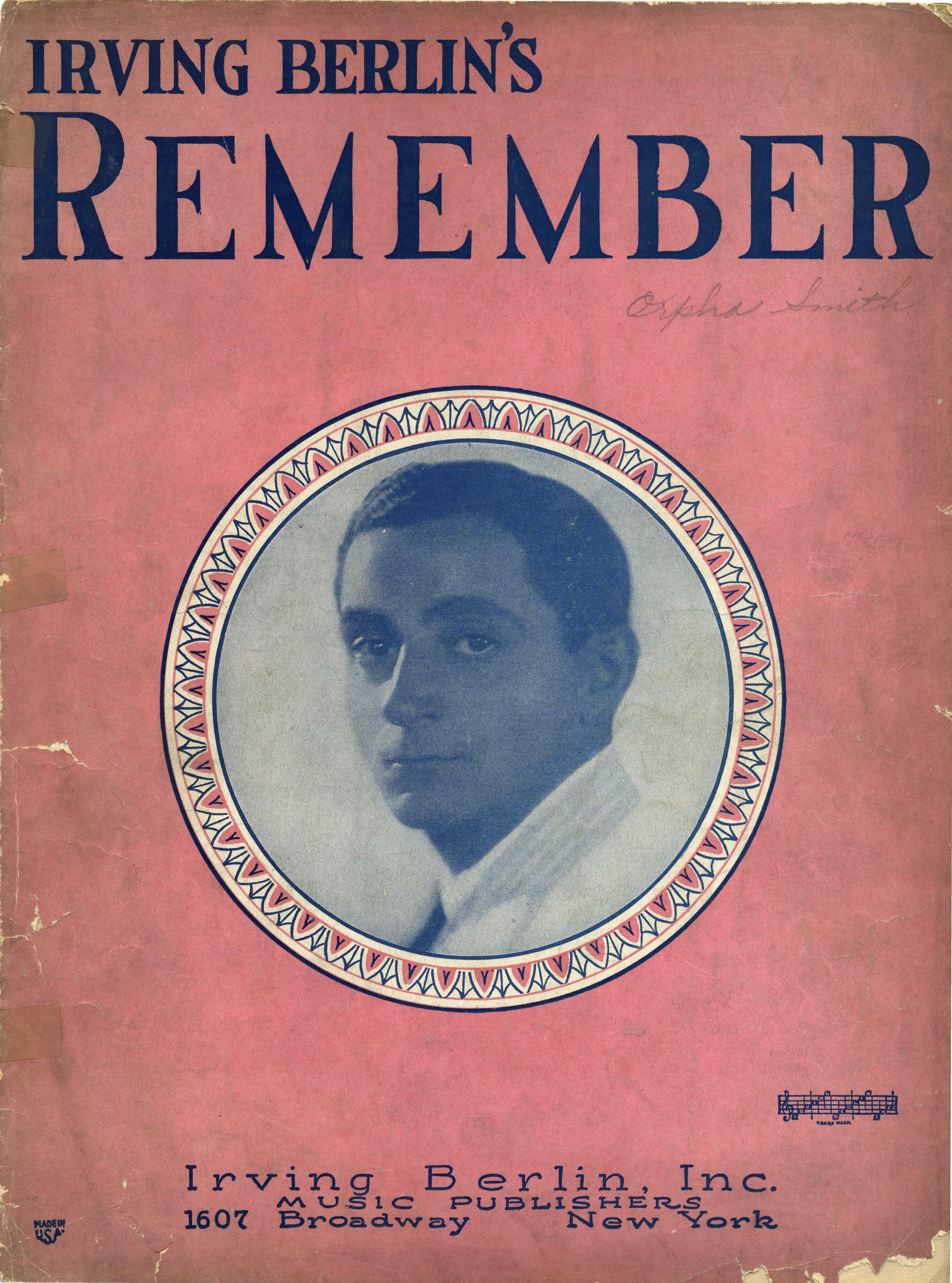
Original sheet music cover

"Remember" is a popular song about nostalgia by Irving Berlin, published in 1925. The song is a popular standard, recorded by numerous artists.

In the lyric, Berlin uses an interesting poetic technique by extending the sound of the word "forgot" into "forget me not" then placing the original word (forgot) and the base form of its opposite (remember) at the end of the next two lines:

"Remember we found a lonely spot,
And after I learned to care a lot,
You promised that you'd forget me not,
But you forgot
To remember."

== First recorded versions ==
Three different versions of "Remember" achieved success between May 1925 and February 1926: Jean Goldkette & His Orchestra featuring Seymour Simons on vocal, an instrumental recording by Isham Jones & His Orchestra, and one by Cliff Edwards.

== Film appearances ==
- Alexander's Ragtime Band (1938) - performed by Alice Faye
- Moontide (1942) - instrumental
- So This is Love (1953) - sung by Kathryn Grayson
- There's No Business Like Show Business (1954) - sung by the cast and later by Ethel Merman and Dan Dailey
- Isn't it Shocking? (1973) - unknown vocalist, orchestrated by David Shire.

== Other recorded versions ==
- Red Norvo (instrumental) (1937)
- Benny Goodman (instrumental) (1938)
- Erroll Garner and Johnny Hartman (1950)
- Billie Holiday on her album An Evening with Billie Holiday (1953)
- Julie London on her Lonely Girl album (1956)
- Sarah Vaughan and Billy Eckstine for their Sarah Vaughan and Billy Eckstine Sing the Best of Irving Berlin album (1957)
- Ella Fitzgerald on her album Ella Fitzgerald Sings the Irving Berlin Song Book (1958)
- Thelonious Monk (instrumental) for his Thelonious Alone in San Francisco album (1959)
- Dinah Shore in the medley: "Remember / All Alone / Always" for her Somebody Loves Me album (1960)
- Betty Carter on her album The Modern Sound of Betty Carter (1960)
- The Ray Conniff Singers on their Young at Heart album (1960)
- Hank Mobley (instrumental) for his Soul Station (1960) album
- Bing Crosby included the song in a medley on his album On the Sentimental Side (1962), and he also recorded it for the 1968 album Bing Crosby's Treasury - The Songs I Love.
- Frank Sinatra for his All Alone album (1962)
- Michael Feinstein and Liza Minnelli for his Remember: Michael Feinstein Sings Irving Berlin album (1987)
- Wes Montgomery (instrumental) on The Complete Riverside Recordings (1992)
