= Landis Valley Museum =

Historic house in Pennsylvania, United States

- Landis Valley Village & Farm Museum
- U.S. National Register of Historic Places
- U.S. Historic district
- Pennsylvania state historical marker
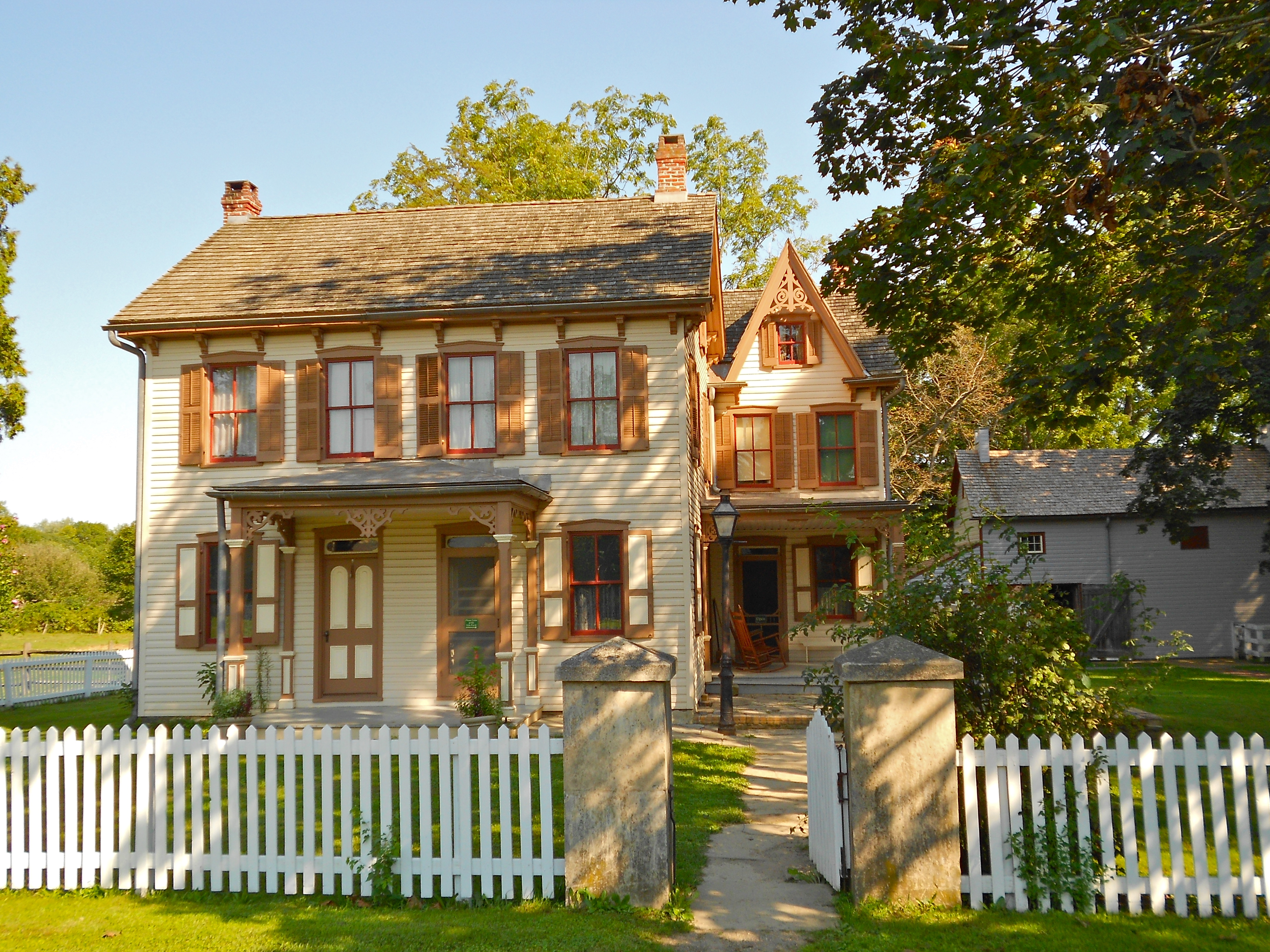
- Landis House in September, 2012

- Location within Pennsylvania Location within the United States
- Nearest city: Lancaster, Pennsylvania
- Coordinates: 40°5′36″N 76°16′48″W
- Area: 100 acres (40 ha)
- Built: 1940
- Architect: D. L. Warfel & Co.
- NRHP reference No.: 99001578

Significant dates
- Added to NRHP: January 3, 2000
- Designated PHMC: 1957

The Landis Valley Village & Farm Museum is a 100-acre living history museum located on the site of a former rural crossroads village in Lancaster, Pennsylvania. Founded by brothers Henry K. Landis and George Landis in 1925 and incorporated in 1941, it is now operated by the Pennsylvania Historical and Museum Commission. Its staff and volunteers collect, conserve, exhibit, and interpret Pennsylvania German material, culture, history and heritage from 1740 through 1940.

It has EIN 23-1573202 as a 501(c)(3) Public Charity; in 2024, it claimed total revenue of $429,790 and total assets of $375,060.

== History ==
Planning for the Landis Valley Village & Farm Museum was undertaken during the early 1920s by brothers Henry K. Landis and George Landis, who had grown up in Lancaster, Pennsylvania during the 1870s and 1880s. With a shared interest in Pennsylvania history, and more specifically in Pennsylvania German history, they became active collectors of a range of historic artifacts, including antique furniture, arrowheads and other Native American relics, bullets, buttons, coins, Conestoga Wagons, dishes and glassware, farm equipment and tools, fossils, Fraktur, guns, pottery, and quilts. Following their retirement in 1924 from their respective careers as a mining and construction/sanitary engineer, the Landis brothers combined their respective collections at the Landis family's farm in Lancaster and, in 1925, officially opened many of their collected items to public viewing. As their holdings continued to grow and their educational attraction increased in popularity, they sought funding from the Carl Shurz Foundation to turn their buildings and collections into an official museum. The cultural attraction was then formally incorporated as the Landis Valley Museum in 1941, and a professional curator was hired to catalogue and display the brothers' collection. The foundation also facilitated the construction of a farm implement barn, gunsmith's shop, tavern, and wagon shed.

In 1953, the aging Landis brothers deeded the museum and property to the Commonwealth of Pennsylvania, which transformed the operation into a living history museum by reconstructing historic structures on adjacent properties purchased by the state in order to develop educational programs that would show groups of teachers and school children, families, tour groups, and other visitors, firsthand, how Pennsylvania Germans lived, farmed and operated their manufacturing businesses during the 18th century. Guides who were specially trained in the performance of period tasks and making of period crafts, and then dressed in period costumes, were also then added as curators and staff continued to refine the museum's educational offerings.

=== Heirloom Seed Project ===
During the mid-1980s, museum staff launched an initiative to preserve the purity of heirloom seeds, which were grown and harvested on Pennsylvania German homesteads and small farms prior to 1940. As of 2019, three production plots, six display gardens, and two hoop houses are being used to save and replant select seeds from year to year, ensuring that these strains of vegetables and other plants remain free from the impacts of modern hybridization. The museum also maintains records which document where each seed originated, and makes select varieties of seed available for sale each year to the general public at the museum's Herb & Garden Faire.

== Exhibits, educational programs and special events ==
This living history museum, which is part of the Pennsylvania State Museum system, celebrates the many inventions developed in Pennsylvania's Lancaster County region, birthplace of the Conestoga wagon and the Pennsylvania longrifle (also known as the Kentucky longrifle). Visitors are able to learn how Conestoga Wagons were made, including the critical process of making spoked wheels, and how 18th-century gunsmiths manufactured rifle barrels. In addition, guides dressed in period costumes explain the traditions and folklore of Pennsylvania Germans who resided in the area between 1740 and 1940 while specially trained artisans demonstrate the procedures for craftmaking and open-hearth cooking.

The features of the museum include:

- Visitor Center
- Landis House & Stable (life during the Victorian Era, between 1870 and 1890)
- Leatherworking Shop
- Pottery Shop
- Log Farm (life between 1760 and 1780)
- Yellow Barn
- Brick Farmstead (life between 1830 and 1850)
- Erisman House
- Blacksmith Shop
- Tavern
- Transportation Building
- Gun Exhibit
- Landis Valley House Hotel
- Conestoga Wagon Shed
- Maple Grove School
- Farm Implement Shed
- Steam Engine Building
- Textile Processes & Garden
- Country Store
- Isaac Landis House, Barn & Feed Mill
- Firehouse
- Tin Shop
- Landis Valley Museum Store

The museum also hosts a free annual bonfire with holiday caroling, as well as other special events throughout the year.

=== Publications ===
- Crago, Carol, Chuck Greeholt, Mike Pengra, Pennsylvania Historical and Museum Commission, and Pennsylvania Commonwealth Media Services. Landis Valley: Pennsylvania German Heritage, 1750-1940. Harrisburg, Pennsylvania: Pennsylvania Commonwealth Media Services, 1999 and 2000. OCLC 48664960
- Heirloom Seed Reference Guide. Lancaster, Pennsylvania: Landis Valley Museum (Heirloom Seed Project), 1997. OCLC 37617829
- Herr, Patricia T., Stephen S. Miller, and Landis Valley Museum. Selected Quilts from the Landis Valley Museum. Lancaster, Pennsylvania: Landis Valley Associates, 2002. OCLC 261233360
- Landis, Henry K. and Elizabeth Johnson. Canoeing on the Juniata, 1888. Harrisburg, Pennsylvania: Pennsylvania Historical and Museum Commission and Landis Valley Associates, 1993. OCLC 29591875
- Landis, Henry Kinzer and George Diller Landis. Lancaster Rifle Accessories. Publication date circa 1944 (publisher's name and location not identified). OCLC 20751008
- Landis Valley Associates. The Landis Valley Cookbook: Pennsylvania German Foods and Traditions. Mechanicsburg, Pennsylvania: Stackpole Books, 2009. OCLC 951227767
- Landis Valley Museum. Fraktur, 1790-1850. Lancaster, Pennsylvania: Landis Valley Museum, 1977. OCLC 646678237
- Landis Valley Museum. The Landis Valley Museum, the Museum of Eastern Pennsylvania Folk Art. Lancaster, Pennsylvania: Publisher unknown, 1942. OCLC 78297319
- Pennsylvania Farm Museum of Landis Valley. Lancaster, Pennsylvania: Landis Valley Associates, 1963, 1968. OCLC 12001387
- Pennsylvania German Fraktur and color drawings: Exhibited at Pennsylvania Farm Museum of Landis Valley, Lancaster, Pennsylvania, May 19-June 30, 1969. Lancaster, Pennsylvania: Landis Valley Associates, 1969. OCLC 15510
- Pennsylvania Historical and Museum Commission Staff. Landis Valley Museum, Lancaster, PA: Rural Life. Harrisburg, Pennsylvania: Pennsylvania Historical and Museum Commission, 1988. OCLC 84977358
- Spiese, Monica D. and Landis Valley Museum. Plant Materials Used by Pennsylvania Germans in the 18th and 19th Centuries Relating to Textile Production and Dyeing: A research paper to support the design and implementation of a textile garden at the Landis Valley Museum. Lancaster, Pennsylvania: Landis Valley Museum, 1993. OCLC 33065607

== Supporters ==
The Landis Valley Village & Farm Museum receives significant financial and volunteer assistance from the Landis Valley Associates, a 3,000-member non-profit community support organization. Members of the LVA receive complimentary museum admission and discounted admission to various special events, as well as discounts at the museum's store.

== Henry K. Landis ==
Henry Kinzer Landis (1865–1955) was an editor, photographer, collector, and founder of the museum.

=== Early life ===
Landis was born in Lancaster County, Pennsylvania to Henry Harrison Landis (1838–1926), a farmer, and Emma Caroline Diller (1842–1929), daughter of a prosperous farmer, in 1865. Henry was one of four children—George Diller (1867–1954), Nettie May (1879–1914), and Anna Margaretta, who died early in childhood.

The Landis family was historically typical Pennsylvania Dutch, originating as Swiss Mennonite folk with the earliest Landis antecedent living twelve miles south of Zurich, Switzerland in 1438. To escape religious persecution, in 1717, three Landis brothers—John, Jacob, and Felix—fled Switzerland. Jacob and Felix Landis established themselves in Lancaster County, Pennsylvania where the name Landis is prominent today.

Henry K. Landis (1865–1955) was raised on multi-generational family farm in a rather tumultuous environment of domestic strife. He attended local schools, and was eventually sent to Lititz Academy as a boarding student with his brother George. Afterwards, the two Landis brothers both matriculated at Lehigh University, but only Henry would graduate in ____ with a degree in Engineering. Landis’ sister Nettie was also educated locally and eventually attended a prep school in Brooklyn, New York.

In 1888, Landis took a canoe trip on the Juniata River in Pennsylvania with his brother George and H. Justin Roddy (1856-1943). A transcription of his Landis's diary entries about the trip, along with the photographs he took of the trip, were published in 1993 by the Pennsylvania Historical and Museum Commission under the title: Canoeing on the Juniata, 1888.

=== Career ===
Landis worked as a mining engineer and educator for several years after he graduated (in the west?). His interest in photography developed at some point during college, but his picture snapping ripened.

Practicing as an engineer was short-lived as Henry eventually relocated to New York City where he worked as an editor of technical journals such as The Gas Age, a publication dedicated to the natural gas industry. Weekends were dedicated to photography whether in and around Manhattan and Brooklyn or in Port Washington on Long Island where he owned a houseboat and sailing vessel. He occasionally returned for vacations in Lancaster County.

Landis’ photography involved a wide range of subject matter including New York City architecture, street and immigrant life, posed-thematic character studies, self-portraits (some of which were in the nude) and a diversity of others.

=== Retirement ===
After several decades in New York City, Landis retired, returning to the family farm where his parents and unmarried siblings had lived for most of their lives. Landis and his brother George began collecting, packing their buildings with farming implements and the domestic artifacts of the culture that revolved around farming. They established an informal museum with Landis as the main guide. Establishing a reputation among the Pennsylvania German community, the Landis brothers were rescued as money and age threatened their museum and ultimately the security of their extensive collection. Gustav Oberlaender (1867–1936), a wealthy German-born Reading, Pennsylvania industrialist and President of the Berkshire Knitting Mills, founded and headed the Oberlaender Trust for Better Understanding Between Citizens of the United States and Germany. Oberlaender was also a Trustee of the Carl Schurz Memorial Association—an organization to honor Carl Schurz (1829–1906), a poster boy for American-German relations. Learning about the collection of the Landis brothers, the Oberlaender Trust incorporated the Landis Valley Museum in 1940, paying for the construction of new exhibition buildings. The museum opened in 1941. With the Oberlaender Trust facing money troubles and the advanced age of the Landis brothers, the museum was acquired by the Commonwealth of Pennsylvania and, eventually, administered by the Pennsylvania Historical and Museum Commission (PHMC), which in co-operation with the Landis Valley Associates still operates the facility today.

Landis, then in his eighties, retained life tenancy of their family home, retained some rights to the collections, and remained a lifetime curator. Landis died in 1955.

== Gallery ==
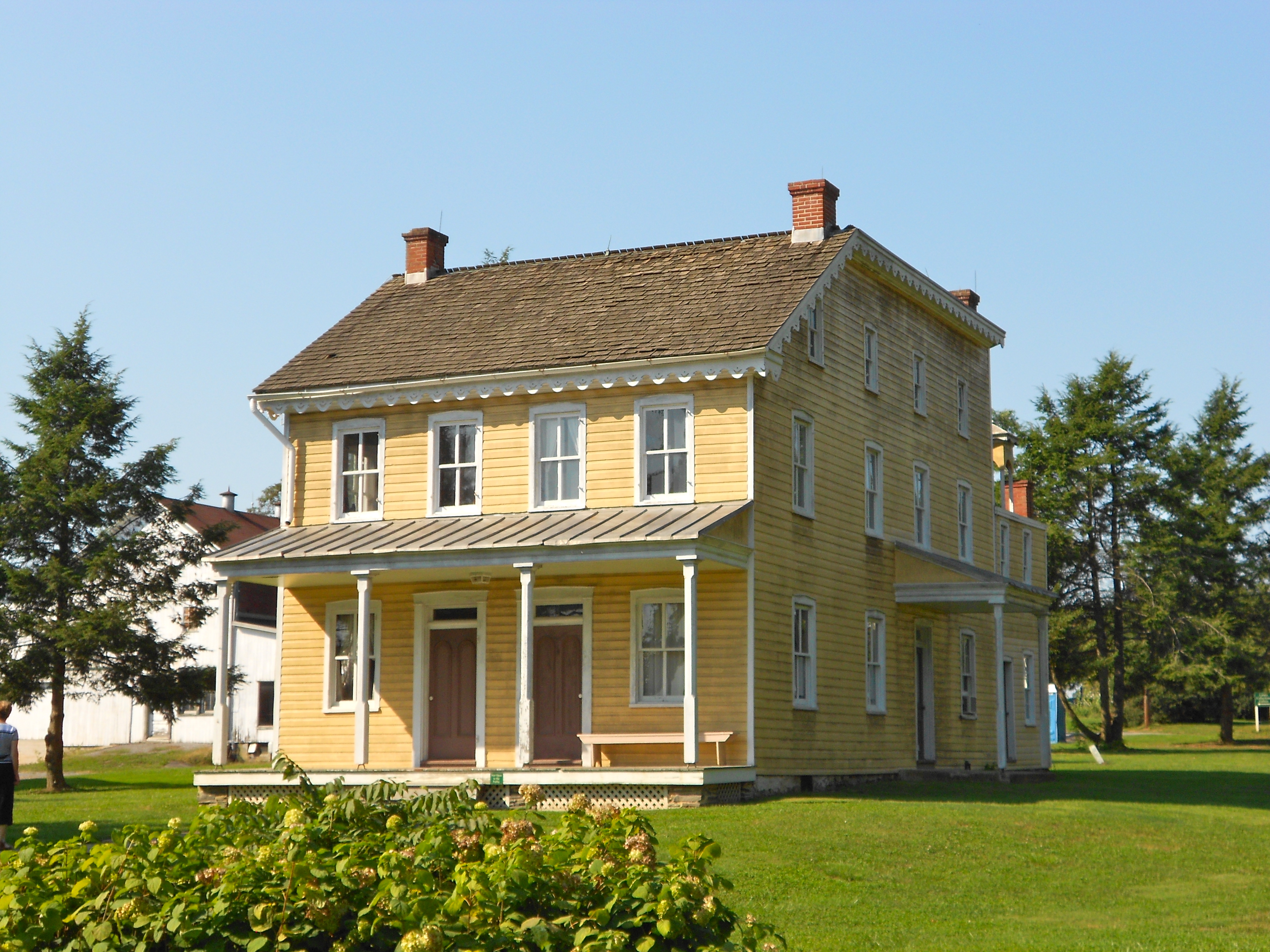
Isaac Landis house, built 1875

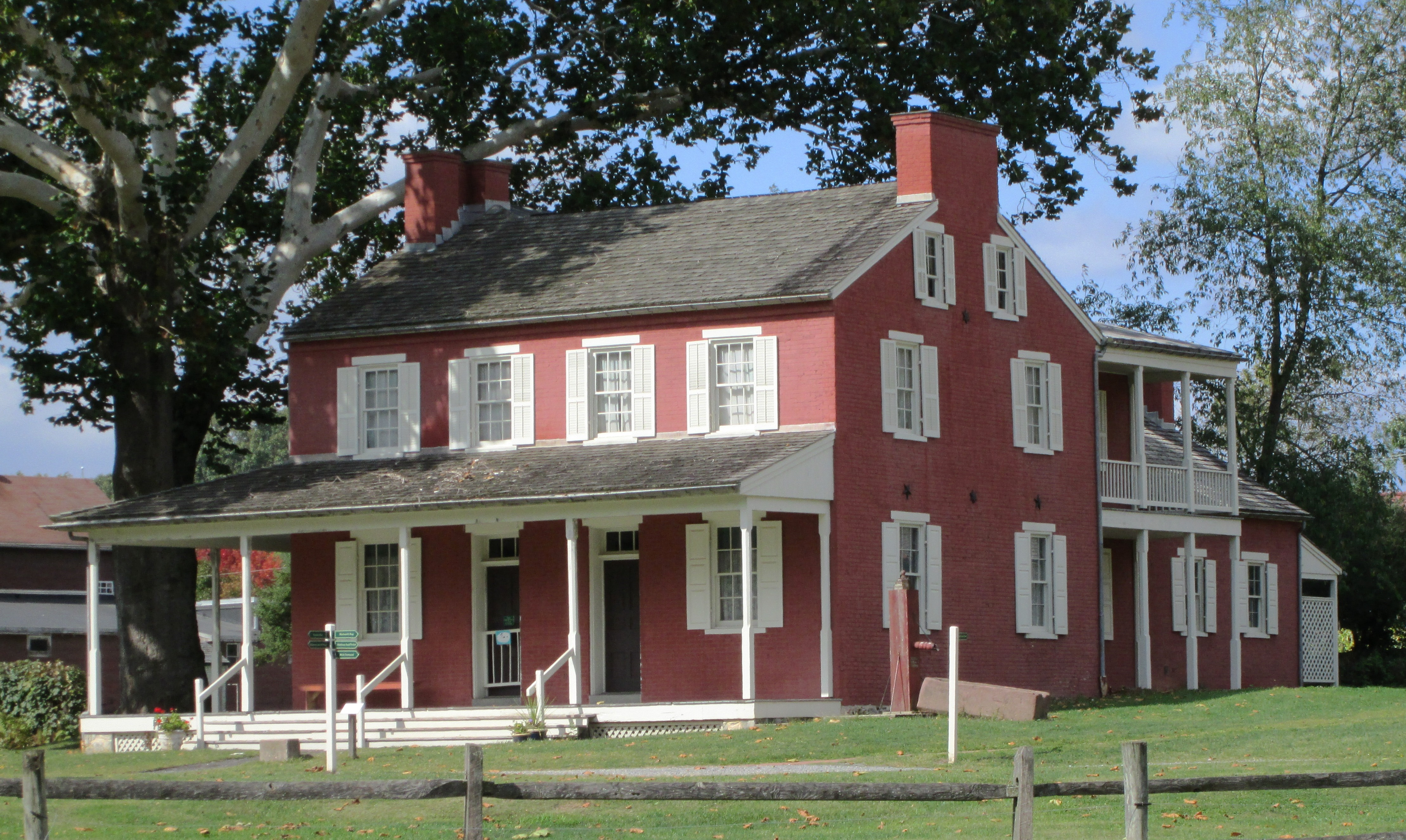
The Landis Valley Hotel, built in 1855-56

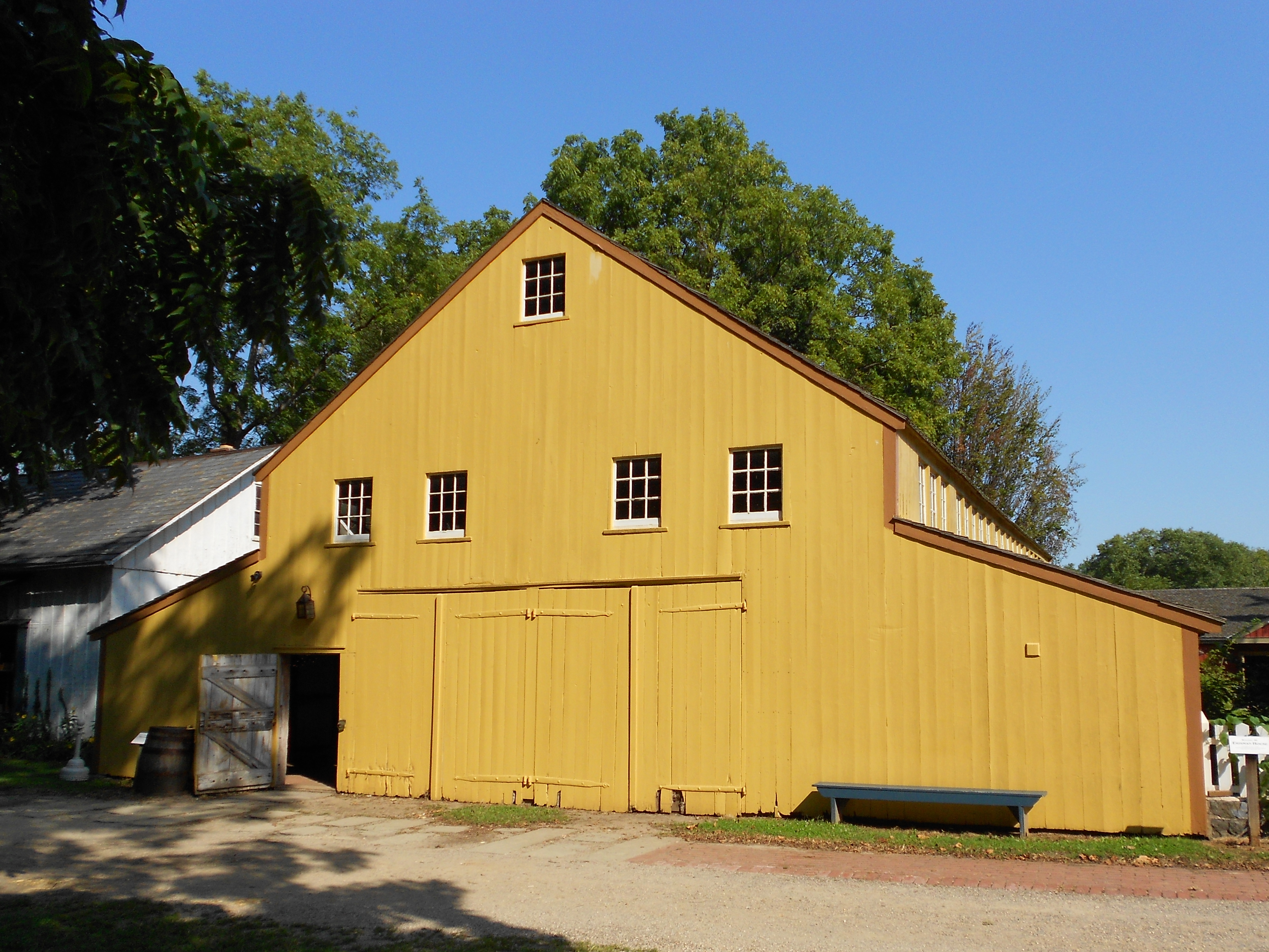
Yellow barn, built 1939

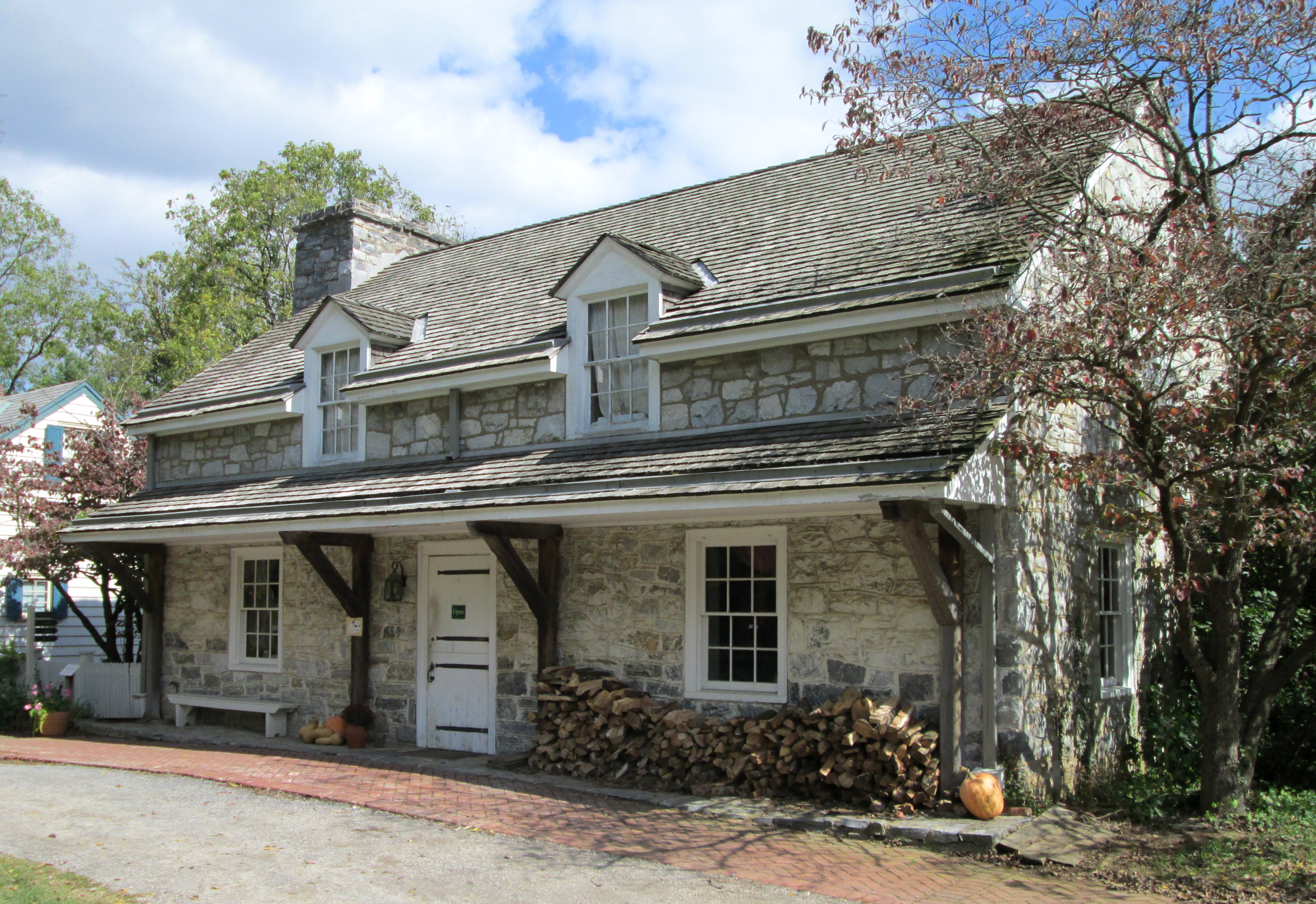
The Tavern, a recreation of one from the early 1800s
