= Morgen (Ivo Robić song) =

Single by Ivo Robić
- B-side: "Ay, Ay, Ay Paloma"
- Released: March 1959 (Germany); July 1959 (US)
- Recorded: 1959
- Genre: Traditional pop
- Length: 2:19
- Label: Polydor (Germany), Laurie (US)
- Songwriter: Pete Moesser

Ivo Robić singles chronology
"Morgen" (1959)	"The Happy Muleteer" (1959)

"Morgen" is a popular song (1959), originally performed in German by Croatian singer Ivo Robić and The Song-Masters, accompanied by Bert Kaempfert and his orchestra.

== Background ==
"Morgen" was written by Peter Moesser, the song became a hit in West Germany, and later a #1 song in Canada and on the US charts in 1959 where it peaked at #13.

== Other recordings ==
- English versions, titled "One More Sunrise" (lyrics by Noel Sherman), were issued as singles by Leslie Uggams, and Vera Lynn and other performers of the era: the only artist to reach the UK Top 20 with his version of the song was Dickie Valentine who spent 7 weeks therein from October to December 1959, peaking at No 14.
- The Ventures recorded an instrumental version to open their first album in 1960, Walk, Don't Run, on Dolton BLP 2003 (monaural)/BST 8003 (stereo).
- Bing Crosby included the song in his 1961 album Holiday in Europe and Petula Clark sang the song on her 1965 album The World's Greatest International Hits.
- Ray Conniff recorded an instrumental version which was part of his album "'S Continental" (Columbia Records CS 8576) released in 1961.
- Bert Kaempfert recorded an instrumental version for the U.S. version of his album "The Wonderland of B. K." for Decca Records in 1961.
