= Christmas Caroling =

Greatest hits album by Ray Conniff
- Released: 1984
- Genre: Pop, Easy listening
- Length: 48:59
- Language: English
- Label: Columbia
- Producer: Ray Conniff

Ray Conniff chronology
Here We Come A-Caroling (1965)	Christmas Caroling (1984)	'S Christmas (1999)

Christmas Caroling is a 1984 compilation album by Ray Conniff, consisting of tracks recorded between 1959 and 1965 and previously released on his three Christmas albums.

== Track listing ==
International edition
No.	Title	Writer(s)	Length
1.	"White Christmas" (from Christmas with Conniff)	Irving Berlin	2:49
2.	"Santa Claus is Comin' to Town" (from Christmas with Conniff)	J. Fred Coots, Haven Gillespie	2:29
3.	"Rudolph, the Red-Nosed Reindeer" (from Christmas with Conniff)	Johnny Marks	2:13
4.	"Winter Wonderland" (from Christmas with Conniff)	Felix Bernard, Richard B. Smith	2:39
5.	"Jingle Bells" (from Christmas with Conniff)	James Lord Pierpont	2:45
6.	"Frosty the Snowman" (from Christmas with Conniff)	Walter "Jack" Rollins, Steve Nelson	2:21
7.	"Silent Night, Holy Night" (from Here We Come A-Caroling)	Joseph Mohr	2:49
8.	"Silver Bells" (from Christmas with Conniff)	Jay Livingston, Ray Evans	2:30
9.	"O Little Town of Bethlehem" (from Here We Come A-Caroling)	Phillips Brooks	2:52
10.	"O Tannenbaum" (from Here We Come A-Caroling)	Traditional	2:10
11.	"God Rest Ye Merry, Gentlemen" (from Here We Come A-Caroling)	Traditional	2:44
12.	"Joy to the World" (from Here We Come A-Caroling)	Isaac Watts	2:14
13.	"Here Comes Santa Claus" (from Christmas with Conniff)	Gene Autry, Oakley Haldeman	2:25
14.	"Sleigh Ride" (from Christmas with Conniff)	Leroy Anderson, Mitchell Parish	2:31
15.	"The Christmas Song (Merry Christmas to You)" (from Christmas with Conniff)	Mel Tormé, Bob Wells	2:49
16.	"The Twelve Days of Christmas" (from We Wish You a Merry Christmas)	Traditional	4:19
17.	"Medley: The First Noel / Hark! The Herald Angels Sing / O Come, All Ye Faithful / We Wish You a Merry Christmas" (from We Wish You a Merry Christmas)	Traditional, Charles Wesley	6:13
