= So Much in Love (Ray Conniff album) =

Studio album by The Ray Conniff Singers
- Released: 1961
- Genre: Easy listening
- Label: Columbia

The Ray Conniff Singers chronology
Young at Heart (1960)	So Much in Love (1961)	'S Continental (1962)

So Much in Love is an album by The Ray Conniff Singers. It was released in 1961 on the Columbia label (catalog no. CS-8520).

The album debuted on Billboard magazine's "Top LPs" chart on February 17, 1962, peaked at No. 5, and remained on that chart for 23 weeks. It was certified by the RIAA as a gold record.

AllMusic later gave the album a rating of four stars. Reviewer Greg Adams called it "a straight choral pop album with orchestral accompaniment and classic songs."

== Track listing ==
Side 1

1. "Autumn Leaves" (J. Mercer, J. Kosma) / "Just Walking in the Rain" (J. Bragg, R. Riley) [4:45]
2. "I Fall In Love Too Easily" (S. Cahn, J. Styne) / "My Heart Stood Still" (L. Hart, R. Rodgers) [4:25]
3. "Dancing On The Ceiling" (L. Hart, R. Rodgers) / "Dancing in the Dark" (H. Dietz, A. Schwartz) [3:35]

Side 2

1. "I Wish I Didn't Love You So" (F. Loesser) / "Bewitched" (L. Hart, R. Rodgers) [4:09]
2. "Whatever Will Be, Will Be" (Que Sera, Sera) (J. Livingston, R. Evans) / "True Love" (Cole Porter) [4:42]
3. "Chances Are" (Al Stillman, Robert Allen) / "It's Not for Me to Say" (Al Stillman, Robert Allen) [5:09]
