= Ivo Robić =

Croatian singer-songwriter (1923–2000)

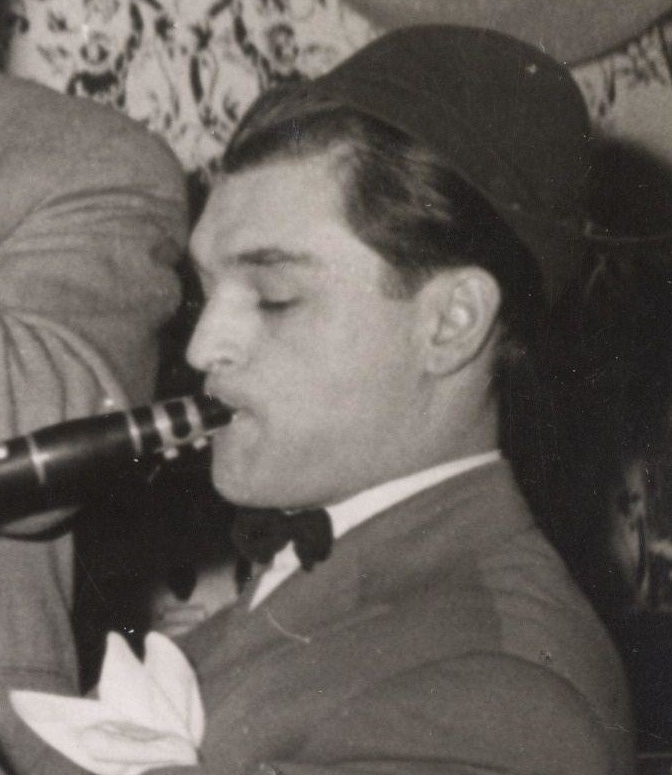
- Robić playing a clarinet in 1953
- Born: 28 January 1923; Garešnica, Kingdom of Serbs, Croats and Slovenes
- Died: 9 March 2000 (aged 77); Rijeka, Croatia
- Occupation: Singer
- Years active: 1943–2000

Ivo Robić (28 January 1923 – 9 March 2000) was a Croatian singer-songwriter.

== Domestic career ==
Robić began his career as a soloist with the Radio Zagreb Orchestra, while studying at the same time in Zagreb. He performed during World War II on "Krugovalna postaja Zagreb" in an Esplanade hotel in Zagreb, Independent State of Croatia.

During his career in what was then Socialist Republic of Croatia, he made more than one hundred records, mostly singles and schlagers. In his own country, the most memorable of his many schlagers might be "Vraćam se Zagrebe tebi" (Coming Back to You, My Zagreb), "Ta tvoja ruka mala" (That Little Hand of Yours), and "Tiho plove moje čežnje" (Silent Sail of My Yearnings).

== International achievements ==
A pioneer of popular Croatian music from the early 1950s on, Robić was an artist who successfully pursued both domestic and international careers for almost half a century. When he began, he was the only artist from Croatia whose records were available in the record shops of Europe and the rest of the world.

Robić was nicknamed "Mister Morgen" following the success of his first international hit, "Morgen" (which means "tomorrow"), in 1959. The optimistic song was the first collaboration between Robić and Bert Kaempfert. Following its success in Germany, the German-language version became a #1 song in Canada and #13 hit on the pop chart (Billboard Hot 100) in the United States, sold over one million copies, and was awarded a gold disc. An English set of lyrics, "One More Sunrise", bearing no resemblance to the German lyrics, sung by Leslie Uggams, reached #98 on the same charts. It has also been performed by many other artists.

Robić was active in recording for Germany's Polydor label. He performed and collaborated with Kaempfert, Freddy Quinn, and Dean Martin. Of the Kaempfert composed international hit of 1966 Strangers in the Night he sang the Yugoslav and German versions Stranci u Noći with lyrics by Marija Renota and Fremde in der Nacht with lyrics by Kurt Feltz.

Robić's other international hits are "Muli-Song" (1960), "Mit 17 fängt das Leben erst an" (1960), "Ein ganzes Leben lang" (1962), "Rot ist der Wein" (1966), and "Ich zeig' dir den Sonnenschein" (1971).
