= 'S Awful Nice =

Studio album by Ray Conniff and His Orchestra
- Released: 1958
- Genre: Easy listening
- Label: Columbia

Ray Conniff and His Orchestra chronology
| 'S Marvelous (1957) | 'S Awful Nice (1958) | Concert in Rhythm (1958) |

'S Awful Nice is an album by Ray Conniff and His Orchestra. It was released in 1958 on the Columbia label (catalog no. CS-8001).

== Overview ==
The album debuted on Billboard magazine's popular albums chart on June 23, 1958, peaked at No. 9, and remained on that chart for 43 weeks. It was his 3rd album with " 'S " in its title, and the most successful one, with the other ones peaking at No. 11 and No. 10.

AllMusic later gave the album a rating of three stars.

== Track listing ==
Side 1

1. "(When Your Heart's On Fire) Smoke Gets In Your Eyes" (Jerome Kern, Otto Harbach)
2. "Lullaby of Birdland" (George Shearing, George David Weiss)
3. "June in January" (Ralph Rainger, Leo Robin)
4. "I Cover The Waterfront" (Edward Heyman, Johnny Green)
5. "The Very Thought of You" (Ray Noble)
6. "It Had To Be You" (Isham Jones, Gus Kahn)

Side 2

1. "Paradise" (Nacio Herb Brown, Gordon Clifford)
2. "April In Paris" (Yip Harburg, Vernon Duke)
3. "That Old Feeling" (Lew Brown, Sammy Fain)
4. "Say It Isn't So" (Irving Berlin)
5. "All the Things You Are" (Jerome Kern, Oscar Hammerstein II)
6. "Lovely to Look At" (Jerome Kern, Dorothy Fields, Jimmy McHugh)

== Charts ==
| Chart (1958) | Peak position |
|---|---|
| US Billboard Top LPs | 9 |
| UK Top LPs | 13 |
