= Dance the Bop! =

Studio album by Ray Conniff
- Released: 1957
- Genre: Rock 'n' roll

Ray Conniff chronology
'S Wonderful (1956)	Dance the Bop! (1957)	'S Marvelous (1957)

Dance the Bop! is a 1957 album by Ray Conniff. All the tracks were written by Conniff with a "solid rock and roll beat" to appeal to the teenage audience of the time. The album was produced in February, 1957. Released by Columbia Records, the album was an attempt by the company to cash in on the teen dance craze.

== Overview ==
Conniff himself never liked this album and felt under pressure by producer and a&r chief Mitch Miller to record it. He once stated in an interview with German television "We should have burnt the tapes". Miller thought that the "new dance" Bop (which has nothing in common with the jazz style of the same name) was on the way to the top at that time while Conniff was afraid of killing his new sound concept (instrumentally singing voices doubling instruments) which he started off with in the late 1956 by releasing his album 'S Wonderful. After the Bop album he returned to this sound which turned out to be a worldwide success in the late 1950s and early 1960s.

The album was a failure, and didn't sell well. It came after a top 15 debut album. The next album, 'S Marvellous, was also successful, which suggested public agreement with Connniff's dislike of the recordings.

== Track listing ==
1. Walkin' the Bop
2. The Drop
3. Just Boppin'
4. Doin' the Twister
5. The Flea Hop
6. Cross Over
7. Walkin' the Bop Again
8. Swingin' the Bop
9. Hand Around
10. Play a Guitar Solo
11. The Spinner
12. Honky-Tonk Rock-Around
