= Conniff Meets Butterfield =

Studio album by Ray Conniff, Billy Butterfield
- Released: 1959
- Genre: Jazz
- Label: Columbia

Ray Conniff, Billy Butterfield chronology
Hollywood in Rhythm (1959)	Conniff Meets Butterfield (1959)	Christmas with Conniff (1959)

Conniff Meets Butterfield is an album by band leader Ray Conniff and trumpeter Billy Butterfield. It was released in 1959 on the Columbia label (catalog no. CS-8155).

The album debuted on Billboard magazine's Top Stereo LP's chart on December 14, 1959, peaking at No. 8 over a 32-week stay on the chart.

AllMusic gave the album a rating of four-and-a-half stars. Reviewer Cub Koda wrote: "Showing off a jazzier side to Conniff that recalls his big-band work, this is a nice album with great trumpet work from Billy Butterfield."

== Track listing ==
Side 1

1. "Beyond the Blue Horizon" (Robin, Whiting, Harling)
2. "You Must Have Been a Beautiful Baby" (Warren, Mercer)
3. "All The Things You Are" (Hammerstein II, Kern)
4. "Oh What a Beautiful Mornin'" (Rodgers and Hammerstein)
5. "Time on My Hands" (Adamson, Gordon, Youmans)
6. "Something to Remember You By" (Schwartz, Dietz)

Side 2

1. "What a Diff'rence a Day Made" (Grever, Adams)
2. "South of the Border" (Kennedy, Carr)
3. "Can't We Be Friends?" (Swift, James)
4. "Rosalie" (Cole Porter)
5. "A Love Is Born" (Ray Conniff)
6. "I Found a Million Dollar Baby" (Rose, Warren, Dixon)

== Charts ==
Chart (1959–1960)	Peak position
US Billboard Top LP's (Monaural)	30
US Billboard Top LP's (Stereo)	8
US Cash Box Best Selling Monaural Albums	14
US Cash Box Best Selling Stereo Albums	13
