= Adoramus te =

Christian religious text

Adoramus te (Latin, "We adore Thee") is a stanza recited or sung mostly during the ritual of the Stations of the Cross. It is recited or sung between stations.

Though primarily a Catholic tradition, it is also practised in some confessional Anglican and Lutheran denominations during Good Friday liturgies, although recited generally in the vernacular.

== Text ==
Latin Text	English Translation
Adoramus Te, Christe, et benedicimus tibi, quia per sanctam crucem tuam redemisti mundum. Qui passus es pro nobis, Domine, Domine, miserere nobis.	We adore Thee, O Christ, and we bless Thee, who by Thy Holy Cross hast redeemed the world. Thou, who hast suffered death for us, O Lord, O Lord, have mercy on us.
