= Broadway in Rhythm =

Studio album by Ray Conniff and His Orchestra and Chorus
- Released: 1961
- Genre: Easy listening
- Label: Columbia

Ray Conniff and His Orchestra and Chorus chronology
Memories Are Made of This (1960)	Broadway in Rhythm (1961)	Somebody Loves Me (1961)

Broadway in Rhythm is an album by Ray Conniff and His Orchestra and Chorus. It was released in 1961 on the Columbia label (catalog no. CL-1252).

The album debuted on Billboard magazine's popular albums chart on March 27, 1961, peaked at No. 10, and remained on that chart for three weeks.

AllMusic gave the album a rating of two stars.

== Track listing ==
Side 1

1. "Oklahoma!" (from Oklahoma!)
2. "People Will Say We're in Love" (from Oklahoma!)
3. "The Surrey with the Fringe on Top" (from Oklahoma!)
4. "Oh, What a Beautiful Morning" (from Oklahoma!)
5. "Hello Young Lovers" (from The King and I)
6. "Getting To Know You; I Whistle a Happy Tune" (from The King and I)

Side 2

1. "On the Street Where You Live" (from My Fair Lady)
2. "I Could Have Danced All Night; I've Grown Accustomed to Her Face" (from My Fair Lady)
3. "A Wonderful Guy" (from South Pacific)
4. "Bali Ha'i" (from South Pacific)
5. "Younger than Springtime" (from South Pacific)
6. "Some Enchanted Evening" (from South Pacific)
