= Honey (Ray Conniff album) =

Studio album by Ray Conniff and The Singers
- Released: 1968
- Genre: Easy listening
- Label: Columbia
- Producer: Jack Gold

Ray Conniff and The Singers chronology
It Must Be Him (1967)	Honey (1968)	Turn Around Look At Me (1968)

Honey is an album by Ray Conniff and The Singers. It was released in 1968 on the Columbia label (catalog no. CS-9661). The recording sessions for the album were supervised and produced by Jack Gold.

== Chart performance ==
The album debuted on Billboard magazine's Top LP's chart in the issue dated June 6, 1968, peaking at No. 22 during a thirty-nine-week run on the chart. The album debuted on Cashbox magazine's Top 100 Albums chart in the issue dated June 1, 1968, peaking at No. 27 during a sixteen-week run on the chart. The album had also proven to be successful overseas, reaching No. 14 in Norway and No. 17 in Germany.

The LP was certified gold in December 1969 by the RIAA. It was Conniff's last album to reach the top 40 on the Billboard albums chart.

== Reception ==
AllMusic gave the album a rating of three stars. Reviewer William Ruhlmann wrote: "Fans of the original songs may have found the results disconcerting on occasion, but Conniff was aiming at a less-discerning audience that could have hummed along when hearing the songs on the radio without paying close attention to the words."

== Track listing ==
Side 1

1. "Honey (I Miss You)" (B. Russell)
2. "I Say a Little Prayer" (B. Bacharach, H. David)
3. "The Look of Love" (From "Casino Royale") (B. Bacharach, H. David)
4. "Love Is Blue (L'Amour est bleu)" (B. Blackburn, A. Popp, P. Cour)
5. "Kiss Me Goodbye" (B. Mason, L. Reed)

Side 2

1. "Gentle on My Mind" (J. Hartford)
2. "By the Time I Get to Phoenix" (J. Webb)
3. "Spanish Eyes" (B. Kaempfert, C. Singleton, E. Snyder)
4. Theme From "Valley of the Dolls" (A. Previn, D. Previn)
5. "The Sound of Silence" (P. Simon)
6. "Goin' Out of My Head" (B. Weinstein, T. Randazzo)

== Charts ==
Chart (1968)	Peak position
GER Media Control Charts	17
NOR VG-lista Top 40 Albums	14
US Billboard Top LPs	22
US Cashbox Top 100 Albums	27

== Certification ==
Region	Certification	Certified units/sales
United States (RIAA)	Gold	500,000^{^}
^{^} Shipments figures based on certification alone.
