= Memories Are Made of This (Ray Conniff album) =

Studio album by Ray Conniff and His Orchestra and Chorus
- Released: 1960
- Genre: Easy listening
- Label: Columbia

Ray Conniff and His Orchestra and Chorus chronology
Say It with Music (1960)	Memories Are Made of This (1960)	Broadway in Rhythm (1961)

Memories Are Made of This is an album by Ray Conniff and His Orchestra and Chorus. It was released in 1960 on the Columbia label (catalog no. CS-8374). The album features Conniff, his orchestra, and a chorus performing wordless vocalizing.

== Overview ==
The album debuted on Billboard magazine's popular album chart on February 13, 1961, peaked at No. 4, and remained on that chart for 27 weeks. It was certified by the RIAA as a gold record.

AllMusic later gave the album a rating of four-and-a-half stars. Reviewer Greg Adams wrote Conniff remakes the songs in "surprising and creative ways" and concluded that it was "simultaneously an infectiously fun album and an impressive display of inspired arrangements."

== Track listing ==
Side A

1. "Memories Are Made of This"
2. "Tammy"
3. "Young Love"
4. "Three Coins in the Fountain"
5. "Moments to Remember"
6. My Foolish Heart"

Side B

1. "Love Me Tender"
2. "Around the World"
3. "Love Letters in the Sand"
4. "Unchained Melody"
5. "Only You (And You Alone)"
6. "No Other Love"

== Charts ==
Chart (1960)	Peak position
US Billboard Top LPs	4
UK Top LPs	14
