= Concert in Rhythm =

Studio album by Ray Conniff and His Orchestra
- Released: 1958
- Genre: Easy listening
- Label: Columbia

Ray Conniff and His Orchestra chronology
| 'S Awful Nice (1958) | Concert in Rhythm (1958) | Hollywood in Rhythm (1959) |

Concert in Rhythm is an album by Ray Conniff and His Orchestra. It was released in 1958 on the Columbia label (catalog no. CS-8022).

== Charts ==
The album debuted on Billboard magazine's Best-Selling LPs chart on September 29, 1958, peaking at No. 9 during a thirty-nine-week run. It was certified gold by the RIAA.

== Reception ==
AllMusic gave the album a rating of four stars. Reviewer Greg Adams wrote that Conniff's "pop-oriented adaptations" of classical music "achieved perhaps his purest blend of voices and instruments, particularly on 'Theme From Swan Lake Ballet.'"

== Track listing ==
Side 1

1. Favorite theme from Tchaikovsky's "First Piano Concerto"
2. Favorite theme from Tchaikovsky's "Swan Lake Ballet"
3. Favorite theme from Rachmaninoff's "Second Piano Concerto"
4. Favorite theme from Tchaikovsky's "Fifth Symphony" (adaptation by Ray Conniff)
5. "Early Evening" (theme from "The Ray Conniff Suite") (Conniff)
6. Favorite theme from Tchaikovsky's "Romeo and Juliet" (adaptation by Ray Conniff)

Side 2

1. "Rhapsody in Blue" (George Gershwin)
2. "I'm Always Chasing Rainbows" (from Chopin's "Fantasy Impromptu") (J. McCarthy, H. Carroll)
3. "The Lamp Is Low" (from Ravel's "Pavane For A Dead Princess") (M. Parish, P. De Rose, B. Shefter)
4. "On the Trail" (from Grofe's "Grand Canyon Suite") (F. Grofe)
5. "My Reverie" (from Debussy's "Rêverie") (L. Clinton)
6. "Schubert's "Serenade" (adaptation by Ray Conniff)

== Charts ==
| Chart (1958) | Peak position |
|---|---|
| US Billboard Best-Selling LPs | 9 |
