= 'S Continental =

Studio album by Ray Conniff and His Orchestra & Chorus
- Released: 1962
- Genre: Easy listening
- Label: Columbia
- Producer: Rann Productions, Inc.

Ray Conniff and His Orchestra & Chorus chronology
So Much in Love (1961)	'S Continental (1962)	We Wish You a Merry Christmas (1962)

'S Continental is an album by Ray Conniff and His Orchestra & Chorus. It was released in 1962 on the Columbia label (catalog nos. CS 8576 stereo and CL 1776 monaural).

== Overview ==
The album debuted on Billboard magazine's "Top LPs" chart on May 12, 1962, peaked at No. 6, and remained on that chart for 18 weeks.

It was his fourth album with 'S in its title, and his most successful one with 'S in its title.

AllMusic later gave the album a rating of three stars. Reviewer William Ruhlmann wrote that the album marked Conniff's return to "a familiar approach" with the vocals "back to 'da'das' and 'doot-doots.'"

== Track listing ==
Side 1

1. "The Continental (You Kiss While You're Dancing)" (Con Conrad, Herb Magidson) [2:45]
2. "The Whiffenpoof Song" (George S. Pomeroy, Meade Minnigerode, Rudy Vallée, T. B. Galloway) [3:21]
3. "Beyond The Sea (La Mer)" (Charles Trenet, Jack Lawrence) [3:32]
4. "Swing Little Glow Worm" (arr. Ray Conniff) [3:09]
5. "The Poor People Of Paris" (Jack Lawrence, Marguerite Monnot) [2:48]
6. "Strange Music" (from the musical production Song Of Norway) (George Forrest, Robert Wright) [2:58]

Side 2

1. "Tico-Tico" (Aloísio de Oliveira, Ervin Drake, Zequinha de Abreu) [2:32]
2. "The White Cliffs of Dover" (Nat Burton, Walter Kent) [3:38]
3. "African Safari" (R. Conniff) [3:09]
4. "Morgen (One More Sunrise)" (Noel Sherman, Peter Moesser) [3:00]
5. "Lisbon Antigua" (Amadeu do Vale, José Galhardo, Raul Portela) [2:37]
6. "Green Eyes" (Adolfo Utrera, Eddie Rivera, Eddie Woods, Nilo Menéndez) [2:44]

== Charts ==
Chart (1962)	Peak position
US Billboard Top LPs	6
