= It Must Be Him (Ray Conniff album) =

Studio album by Ray Conniff and The Singers
- Released: 1967
- Genre: Easy listening
- Length: 29 minutes 14 seconds
- Label: Columbia
- Producer: Jack Gold

Ray Conniff and The Singers chronology
Hawaiian Album (1967)	It Must Be Him (1967)	Honey (1968)

It Must Be Him is an album by Ray Conniff and The Singers. It was released in 1967 on the Columbia label (catalog no. CS-9595).

== Reception ==
The album debuted on Billboard magazine's "Top LPs" chart on March 30, 1968, peaked at No. 25, and remained on that chart for 13 weeks. It was certified by the RIAA as a gold record. The album debuted on Cashbox magazine's Top 100 Albums chart in the issue dated February 10, 1968, peaking at No. 46 during a sixteen-week run on the chart. The album had also proven to be successful overseas, reaching No. 16 in Norway and No. 28 in Germany.

AllMusic later gave the album a rating of three stars. Reviewer William Ruhlmann called it "a fairly typical collection of easy listening interpretations of pop hits from 1965-1967 that had been fairly easy to listen to in their original recordings."

== Track listing ==
Side One
No.	Title	Writer(s)	Length
1.	"Music to Watch Girls By"	Sid Ramin; Tony Velona	3:03
2.	"Yesterday"	John Lennon; Paul McCartney	2:55
3.	"Somethin' Stupid"	C. Carson Parks	2:28
4.	"It Must Be Him"	Gilbert Bécaud; Mack David	3:24
5.	"A Man and a Woman"	Francis Lai; Pierre Barouh	3:11

Side Two
No.	Title	Writer(s)	Length
1.	"Release Me"	Eddie Miller; Robert Yount; W.S. Stevenson	2:10
2.	"There's a Kind of Hush (All Over the World)"	Geoff Stephens; Les Reed	2:25
3.	"What the World Needs Now Is Love"	Hal David; Burt Bacharach	2:07
4.	"Don't Sleep in the Subway"	Jackie Trent; Tony Hatch	3:16
5.	"Up, Up and Away"	Jimmy Webb	2:18
6.	"The Impossible Dream" (from Man of La Mancha)	Mitch Leigh; Joe Darion	2:57
Total length:			29:14

== Charts ==
Chart (1968)	Peak position
GER Media Control Charts	28
NOR VG-lista Top 40 Albums	16
US Billboard Top LPs	25
US Cashbox Top 100 Albums	46

== Certification ==
Region	Certification	Certified units/sales
United States (RIAA)	Gold	500,000^{^}
^{^} Shipments figures based on certification alone.
