= This Is My Song (Ray Conniff album) =

Studio album by Ray Conniff
- Released: May 1967
- Genre: Easy listening
- Length: 30 minutes 32 seconds
- Label: Columbia
- Producer: Jack Gold

Ray Conniff chronology
En Espanol! (1967)	''This Is My Song'' (1967)	Hawaiian Album (1967)

This Is My Song is an LP album released by Columbia Records in 1967 under catalog number CS 9476, containing mostly songs from musical plays and movies.

== Chart performance ==
In 1967, Conniff had a minor hit single, "Cabaret" (No. 129 US), and after it he recorded an album featuring 1966 and 1967 hit songs.

The album debuted on Billboard magazine's Top LP's chart in the issue dated Janune 3, 1967, peaking at No. 30 during a forty-six-week run on the chart. The album debuted on Cashbox magazine's Top 100 Albums chart in the issue dated May 27, 1967, peaking at No. 25 during a seventeen-week run on the chart. The album had also proven to be successful overseas, reaching No. 25 in Germany during a three-week run on the charts. This Is My Song saw the biggest commercial success in Norway, where it reached a peak position of No. 4 over the course of a nineteen-week chart run.

== Reception ==
The album received a positive critical reception upon its release. The Daily Breeze stated that "Conniff's crew stays in the winning groove with this easy listening set." They also noted that "With a push on 'Born Free' take, Conniff goes with show tunes and big film songs in release that can't miss making the charts." Cashbox magazine described Conniff's arrangements as "zestful and contemporary as the songs themselves," also saying that the "Singers match the songs mood for mood. They concluded that "The LP should find acceptance with a wide number of listeners."

Retrospectively, Stephen Thomas Erlewine on AllMusic said that the album is "a good but unexceptional collection that combines some of Ray Conniff's biggest hits with his versions of '60s pop hits," and that "it's an entertaining sampler, featuring nice versions of 'Mame,' 'Sunrise, Sunset,' 'Cabaret,' 'Strangers in the Night,' 'What Now My Love,' 'Winchester Cathedral,' 'Georgy Girl,' 'Born Free' and the title track."

== Track listing ==
=== Side One ===
No.	Title	Writer(s)	Musical	Length
1.	"This Is My Song"	Charlie Chaplin	A Countess From Hong Kong	2:38
2.	"Mame"	Jerry Herman	Mame	2:46
3.	"Sunrise, Sunset"	Jerry Bock / Sheldon Harnick	Fiddler on the Roof	3:47
4.	"Cabaret"	Fred Ebb / John Kander	Cabaret	2:53
5.	"Strangers in the Night"	Bert Kaempfert / Charlie Singleton / Eddie Snyder	A Man Could Get Killed	3:06
6.	"What Now, My Love?"	Gilbert Bécaud / Pierre Delanoë / Carl Sigman	—	2:32

=== Side Two ===
No.	Title	Writer(s)	Musical	Length
7.	"My Cup Runneth Over"	Darrell Edwards / Harvey Schmidt	I Do! I Do!	2:36
8.	"Winchester Cathedral"	Geoff Stephens	—	2:11
9.	"The World Will Smile Again"	Howard Greenfield / Maurice Jarre	The Night of the Generals	2:42
10.	"Georgy Girl"	Jim Dale / Tom Springfield	Georgy Girl	2:40
11.	"Born Free"	John Barry / Don Black	Born Free	2:41
Total length:				30:32

== Charts ==
Chart peaks for This Is My Song
Chart (1967)	Peak position
GER Media Control Charts	25
NOR VG-lista Top 40 Albums	4
US Billboard Top LPs	30
US Cashbox Top 100 Albums	25
