= 'S Marvelous =

Studio album by Ray Conniff and His Orchestra
- Released: 1957
- Genre: Easy listening
- Label: Columbia

Ray Conniff and His Orchestra chronology
Dance the Bop! (1957)	'S Marvelous (1957)	'S Awful Nice (1958)

'S Marvelous is an album by Ray Conniff and His Orchestra. It was released in mono in 1957 on the Columbia label (catalog no. CL 1074) and in stereo (catalog no. CS 8037) in 1958.

== Chart performance ==
The album came after an unsuccessful one with a bop sound, but this one debuted on Billboard magazine's pop album chart on December 23, 1957, peaked at No. 10, and remained on the chart for 31 weeks. On the Cash Box albums chart, it peaked at No. 7, staying on the chart for 15 weeks. It was certified by the RIAA as a gold record.

== Reception ==
AllMusic later gave the album a rating of four-and-a-half stars. Reviewer William Ruhlmann called it "a set of lively arrangements of standards featuring a wordless chorus."

== Track listing ==
Side 1

1. "You Do Something to Me" (Cole Porter)
2. "As Time Goes By" (Herman Hupfeld)
3. "In the Still of the Night" (Cole Porter)
4. "Someone to Watch Over Me" (George Gershwin, Ira Gershwin)
5. "Be My Love" (Sammy Cahn, Nicholas Brodszky)
6. "Where or When" (Richard Rodgers, Lorenz Hart)

Side 2

1. "The Way You Look Tonight" (Jerome Kern, Dorothy Fields)
2. "I Hear a Rhapsody" (George Fragos, Jack Baker, Dick Gasparre)
3. "They Can't Take That Away from Me" (George Gershwin, Ira Gershwin)
4. "Moonlight Serenade" (Glenn Miller, Mitchell Parish)
5. "I Love You" (Cole Porter)
6. "I've Told Ev'ry Little Star" (Jerome Kern, Oscar Hammerstein II)

== Charts ==
Chart (1957)	Peak position
US Billboard Top LPs	10
US Cashbox Top LPs	7
