= 'S Wonderful! =

Studio album by Ray Conniff
- Released: October 8, 1956
- Recorded: November 11, 1955 – June 18, 1956
- Genre: Pop, easy listening
- Length: 30:21
- Label: Columbia
- Producer: Mitch Miller

Ray Conniff chronology
'S Wonderful! (1956)	Dance the Bop! (1957)

'S Wonderful! is a 1956 album by Ray Conniff, his orchestra and (wordless) chorus. It was his first album released under his name. The album was produced completely in mono by Mitch Miller at Columbia Records' 30th Street Studios in New York City. The album became a hit and Conniff recorded three more albums in a similar style.

== Overview ==
With S' Wonderful, Conniff "combined a chorus of four men and four women with a traditional big band mix of 18 instruments". The success of the album's format resulted in Conniff continuing the pattern over a number of subsequent albums (each starting with "'S" in its title), recording them in a similar style.

== Chart performance ==
The album reached No. 11 on the Billboard Best Selling Pop Albums chart and No. 12 on the Cash Box pop albums chart, where it remained on the chart for 38 weeks. The title track, a recording of "'S Wonderful", was released as a single and peaked at No. 73 on the Billboard Top 100 singles chart.

== Critical reception ==
Professional ratings
Review scores
Source	Rating
AllMusic	4.5/5 stars

AllMusic rated the album 4.5 stars while its review by William Ruhlmann stated, "Conniff updated the big band sound to the '50s, retaining its danceable tempos and building upon the unison section innovations of Glenn Miller...Employing standards with familiar melodies, the imaginativeness of his work became all the more noticeable."

== Track listing ==
International edition
No.	Title	Writer(s)	Length
1.	"'S Wonderful"	George Gershwin, Ira Gershwin	2:29
2.	"Dancing in the Dark"	Arthur Schwartz, Howard Dietz	2:46
3.	"Speak Low"	Kurt Weill, Ogden Nash	3:55
4.	"Wagon Wheels"	Billy Hill, Peter de Rose	3:15
5.	"Sentimental Journey"	Les Brown, Ben Homer, Bud Green	2:42
6.	"Begin the Beguine"	Cole Porter	2:42
7.	"September Song"	Kurt Weill, Maxwell Anderson	2:46
8.	"I Get a Kick Out of You"	Cole Porter	3:14
9.	"Stardust"	Hoagy Carmichael, Mitchell Parish	2:18
10.	"I'm an Old Cowhand (From the Rio Grande)"	Johnny Mercer	2:55
11.	"Sometimes I'm Happy"	Vincent Youmans, Irving Caesar	3:02
12.	"That Old Black Magic"	Harold Arlen, Johnny Mercer	2:47

== Recording dates ==
Recording dates based on Ray Conniff's diaries:

- November 11, 1955: Stardust/Begin the Beguine (to be released as a single first)
- March 26, 1956: Dancing in the Dark/That Old Black Magic
- June 15, 1956: September Song/Speak Low/I Get a Kick Out of You/Sometimes I'm Happy
- June 18, 1956: 'S Wonderful/Wagon Wheels/I'm an Old Cowhand/Sentimental Journey

== Charts ==
Chart (1957)	Peak position
US Billboard Best Selling Pop Albums	11
US Cash Box Best Selling Pop Albums	12
