= Say It with Music (A Touch of Latin) =

Studio album by Ray Conniff, His Orchestra and Chorus
- Released: 1960
- Genre: Easy listening
- Label: Columbia

Ray Conniff, His Orchestra and Chorus chronology
Young at Heart (1960)	Say It with Music (A Touch of Latin) (1960)	Memories Are Made of This (1960)

Say It with Music (A Touch of Latin) is an album by Ray Conniff, His Orchestra and Chorus. It was released in 1960 on the Columbia label (catalog no. CL-1490).

== Overview ==
The album debuted on Billboard magazine's popular albums chart on October 10, 1960, peaked at No. 4, and remained on that chart for 58 weeks. It was his second best charting album ever, with his next album also peaking at No. 4 on the Billboard Top LPs, but stayed on the chart 20 weeks less.

AllMusic later gave the album a rating of three-and-a-half stars.

== Track listing ==
Side 1

1. "Bésame Mucho" (C. Velazquez, S. Skylar) [2:37]
2. "Stranger in Paradise" (G. Forrest, R. Wright) [3:03]
3. "Summertime" (D. Heyward, G. Gershwin) [2:38]
4. "I've Got You Under My Skin" (Cole Porter) [3:00]
5. "Too Young" (S. Lippman, S. Dee) [2:39]
6. "Softly, As in a Morning Sunrise" (Oscar Hammerstein II, Sigmund Romberg) [3:20]

Side 2

1. "Just One of Those Things" (Cole Porter) [3:22]
2. "Deep Purple" (M. Parrish, P. DeRose) [1:30]
3. "Brazil" (Ary Barroso, Bob Russell) [3:03]
4. "Night and Day" (Cole Porter) [3:17]
5. "Temptation" (A. Freed, N. Brown) [3:37]
6. "Say It with Music" (Irving Berlin) [2:26]

== Charts ==
Chart (1960)	Peak position
US Billboard Top LPs	4
