= Somewhere My Love and Other Great Hits =

Studio album by Ray Conniff and The Singers
- Released: 1966
- Genre: Easy listening
- Label: Columbia
- Producer: Ernie Altschuler

Somewhere My Love and Other Great Hits is an album by Ray Conniff and The Singers. It was released in 1966 on the Columbia label (catalog no. CS-9319). The title track reached No. 9 on the singles chart.

== Chart performance ==
The album debuted on Billboard magazine's "Top LPs" chart on July 16, 1966, peaked at No. 3, and remained on that chart for 41 weeks. It was certified by the RIAA as a platinum record. It was his best charting album ever, coming after a well charting single with the same name. The album peaked at No. 34 in the UK in 1967.

== Reception ==
AllMusic later gave the album a rating of three stars. Reviewer Cub Koda called it the "lushest of all Conniff albums."

== Track listing ==
Side 1

1. "Red Roses for a Blue Lady" (Sid Tepper, Roy C. Bennett)
2. "Downtown" (Tony Hatch)
3. "Charade" (from the motion picture Charade) (Henry Mancini, Johnny Mercer)
4. "King of the Road" (Roger Miller)
5. "Edelweiss" (from The Sound of Music) (Rodgers and Hammerstein)
6. "Young and Foolish" (from Plain and Fancy) (Albert Hague, Arnold B. Horwitt)

Side 2

1. "Somewhere, My Love" ("Lara's Theme" from Dr. Zhivago) (Maurice Jarre, Paul Francis Webster)
2. "Days of Wine and Roses" (from the motion picture Days of Wine and Roses) (Henry Mancini, Johnny Mercer)
3. "Tie Me Kangaroo Down, Sport" (vocal solo by Jay Meyer) (written by Rolf Harris)
4. "Wouldn't It Be Loverly" (from the musical production My Fair Lady) (Alan Jay Lerner, Frederick Loewe)
5. "So Long, Farewell" (from the musical production The Sound of Music) (Rodgers and Hammerstein)

== Charts ==
Chart (1966)	Peak position
US Billboard Top LPs	3
UK Top Albums	34
