= Christmas with Conniff =

Studio album by Ray Conniff
- Released: 1959
- Genre: Pop, easy listening
- Length: 30:56
- Language: English
- Label: Columbia
- Producer: Ray Conniff

Ray Conniff chronology
Conniff Meets Butterfield (1959)	Christmas with Conniff (1959)	It's the Talk of the Town (1960)

Christmas with Conniff is a 1959 album from Ray Conniff of mostly secular Christmas songs. For the most part, the album relies on uptempo songs like "Here Comes Santa Claus" and "Frosty the Snowman".

== Track listing ==
Original recording version
No.	Title	Length
1.	"Here Comes Santa Claus"	2:25
2.	"Winter Wonderland"	2:39
3.	"Rudolph, the Red-Nosed Reindeer"	2:13
4.	"Christmas Bride"	2:53
5.	"Sleigh Ride"	2:31
6.	"Greensleeves (What Child is This?)"	2:32
7.	"Jingle Bells"	2:45
8.	"Silver Bells"	2:30
9.	"Frosty the Snowman"	2:21
10.	"White Christmas"	2:49
11.	"Santa Claus is Comin' to Town"	2:29
12.	"The Christmas Song (Merry Christmas To You)"	2:49

International edition
No.	Title	Writer(s)	Length
1.	"Jingle Bells"	James Lord Pierpont	2:43
2.	"Silver Bells"	Jay Livingston, Ray Evans	2:27
3.	"Frosty the Snowman"	Walter "Jack" Rollins, Steve Nelson	2:18
4.	"White Christmas"	Irving Berlin	2:46
5.	"Santa Claus is Comin' to Town"	J. Fred Coots, Haven Gillespie	2:26
6.	"The Christmas Song (Merry Christmas to You)"	Mel Tormé, Bob Wells	2:46
7.	"Here Comes Santa Claus"	Gene Autry, Oakley Haldeman	2:22
8.	"Winter Wonderland"	Felix Bernard, Richard B. Smith	2:36
9.	"Rudolph, the Red-Nosed Reindeer"	Johnny Marks	2:10
10.	"Christmas Bride"	Midge Jay	2:50
11.	"Sleigh Ride"	Leroy Anderson, Mitchell Parish	2:28
12.	"Greensleeves (What Child Is This?)"	William Chatterton Dix	2:29

2010 Digitally remastered iTunes version
No.	Title	Length
1.	"Sleigh Ride"	2:28
2.	"Here Comes Santa Claus"	2:22
3.	"Rudolph, the Red-Nosed Reindeer"	2:11
4.	"Christmas Bride"	2:50
5.	"Winter Wonderland"	2:36
6.	"Greensleeves (What Child is This?)"	2:29
7.	"Jingle Bells"	2:42
8.	"Frosty the Snowman"	2:18
9.	"White Christmas"	2:47
10.	"Santa Claus is Comin' to Town"	2:26
11.	"Silver Bells"	2:27
12.	"The Christmas Song (Merry Christmas To You)"	2:46

== Charts ==
Year	Peak chart position
Year	US Albums
1959	14
1961	15
1961	16
