= Young at Heart (Ray Conniff album) =

Studio album by The Ray Conniff Singers
- Released: 1960
- Genre: Easy listening
- Label: Columbia

The Ray Conniff Singers chronology
Concert in Rhythm Vol. 2 (1960)	Young at Heart (1960)	Say It with Music (1960)

Young at Heart is an album by The Ray Conniff Singers. It was released in 1960 on the Columbia label (catalog no. CL-1489).

== Overview ==
The album debuted on Billboard magazine's popular albums chart on August 15, 1960, peaked at No. 6, and remained on that chart for 13 weeks.

AllMusic later gave the album a rating of three stars. Reviewer Greg Adams wrote that Conniff's "expert arranging skills and the talent of his chorus are on prominent display."

== Track listing ==
Side 1

1. "Remember" (Irving Berlin) [2:18]
2. "You'll Never Know" (Harry Warren, Mack Gordond) [3:22]
3. "Dancing with Tears in My Eyes" (Al Dubin, Joe Burke) [3:16]
4. "I'm in the Mood for Love" (Jimmy McHugh, Dorothy Fields) [2:27]
5. "I'll Be Seeing You" (Irving Kahal, Sammy Fain) [2:55]
6. "It's Dark On Observatory Hill" (Harold Spina, Johnny Burke) [2:34]

Side 2

1. "These Foolish Things (Remind Me of You)" (Harry Link, Holt Marvell, Jack Strachey) [2:24]
2. "Ma! He's Making Eyes at Me" (Con Conrad, Sidney Clare) [2:10]
3. "Young At Heart" (Carolyn Leigh, Johnny Richards) [2:24]
4. "If I Loved You" (Rodgers and Hammerstein) [2:37]
5. "Harbor Lights" (Hugh Williams, Jimmy Kennedy) [2:32]
6. "I'll See You In My Dreams" (Gus Kahn, Isham Jones) [2:13]

== Charts ==
Chart (1960)	Peak position
US Billboard Top LPs	6
