= Billy Butterfield =

American bandleader and trumpeter (1917–1988)

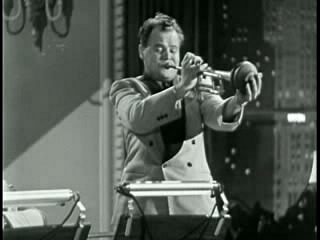
- Billy Butterfield in the Artie Shaw band, 1940

Background information
- Born: Charles William Butterfield; January 14, 1917; Middletown, Ohio, U.S.
- Died: March 18, 1988 (aged 71) North Palm Beach, Florida
- Genres: Jazz, swing, big band
- Occupation: Musician
- Instruments: Trumpet, flugelhorn, cornet

Charles William Butterfield (January 14, 1917 – March 18, 1988) was an American jazz bandleader, trumpeter, flugelhornist, and cornetist.

== Early years ==
Charles William Butterfield was born in Middletown, Ohio and attended high school in Wyoming. Although he studied medicine at Transylvania College, he preferred playing in bands, and he studied cornet with Frank Simon. He discontinued his studies after finding success as a trumpeter.

== Career ==
Early in his career, Butterfield played in the band of Austin Wylie. He gained attention working with Bob Crosby (1937–1940), and later performed with Artie Shaw, Les Brown, and Benny Goodman.

While with Bob Crosby, he initially played third trumpet behind Charlie Spivak and Yank Lawson. When those two left Crosby to join Tommy Dorsey's band in 1938, Butterfield was given the chance to solo on a song written by Crosby bassist Bob Haggart, initially titled "I'm Free". When lyrics were added, it became the well-known standard "What's New?".

On October 7, 1940, during his brief stay with Artie Shaw's orchestra, Butterfield performed what has been described as a "legendary trumpet solo" on the hit song "Star Dust". He was also a featured soloist in the small group from Shaw's band, the Gramercy Five. Between 1943 and 1947, while serving in the U.S. armed forces, Butterfield led his own orchestra. On September 20, 1944, Capitol recorded the jazz standard "Moonlight In Vermont", which featured a vocal by Margaret Whiting and trumpet solos (both open and muted) by Butterfield. The liner notes from the CD Capitol from the Vaults, Volume 2, "Vine Street Divas" indicate that, although Billy Butterfield & His Orchestra were credited with the song, it was really the Les Brown band recording under the name of Billy Butterfield, because Brown was under contract to another label.

Butterfield recorded two albums with arranger-conductor Ray Conniff, Conniff Meets Butterfield, (1959) and Just Kiddin' Around (1962). Both were commercial hits. Later in the 1960s he recorded two albums with his own orchestra for Columbia Records.

The trumpeter was a member of the World's Greatest Jazz Band, led by former Crosby bandmates Yank Lawson and Bob Haggart, from the late 1960s until his death in 1988. He freelanced as a guest star with bands all over the world, and performed at many jazz festivals including the Manassas Jazz Festival and Dick Gibson's Bash in Colorado.

== Film ==
Butterfield is seen in the film Second Chorus (1940) as a member of an orchestra led by Artie Shaw.

== Personal life ==
Butterfield was married to singer Dotty Dare Smith.

== Death ==
Butterfield died on March 18, 1988, in North Palm Beach, Florida. He was 71.

== Discography ==
Solo

- Gershwin (Capitol, 1945, No. 4 US)
- Stardusting (Capitol, 1950)
- "That Butterfield Bounce" (Westminster Records, 1954)
- Billy Butterfield (1955)
- New York Land Dixie (1955)
- They're Playing Our Song (RCA, 1956)
- Session at Riverside (Capitol, 1957)
- I'm In The Mood (Belldisc Italiana, 1959)
- Billy Blows His Horn (Columbia, 1961)
- The Golden Horn (Columbia, 1962)
- Songs Bix Beiderbecke Played (Epic, 1969)
- With Ted Easton's Jazzband (Circle, 1975)
- Watch What Happens (Jazzology, 1977)
- Swinging at the Elks (Fat Cat Jazz, 1978)
- You Can Depend on Me (Fat Cat Jazz, 1980)
- Just Friends (Jazzology, 1982)
- The Incomparable Butterfield Horn (Fat Cat Jazz, 2002)
- Recipe for Romance (Collectors' Choice Music, 2003)
- Soft Strut (Fresh Sound, 2004)
- What Is There to Say (Jasmine, 2005)

With Buck Clayton

- All the Cats Join In (Columbia, 1956)

With Ray Conniff

List of albums, with selected chart positions, showing other relevant details
Title	Album details	Chart positions	
Title	Album details	US 200	US CB
Conniff Meets Butterfield	Released: 1959; Label: Columbia; Formats: LP	8	13
Just Kiddin' Around	Released: 1962; Label: Columbia; Formats: LP	85	33
