= We Wish You a Merry Christmas (Ray Conniff album) =

Studio album by Ray Conniff
- Released: 1962
- Recorded: May 15–17, 1962
- Studio: CBS Recording Studios in Hollywood, California
- Genre: Pop, Christmas, easy listening
- Length: 30:58
- Language: English
- Label: Columbia
- Producer: Rann Productions, Inc. Production Coordinator: Ernie Altschuler Recording Sessions Supervised by Bob Ballard

Ray Conniff chronology
'S Continental (1962)	We Wish You a Merry Christmas (1962)	Here We Come A-Caroling (1965)

We Wish You a Merry Christmas is a 1962 album by Ray Conniff. The album was one of two platinum albums over the course of Conniff's career and earned him the title of CBS Records Best Selling Artist for 1962.

== Overview ==
It was his second Christmas album, and charted well. It peaked at No. 32 on the Billboard Top LPs, and stayed on the chart for 4 weeks.

== Track listing ==
International edition
No.	Title	Writer(s)	Length
1.	"Medley: Jolly Old St. Nicholas / The Little Drummer Boy"	Traditional, Katherine K. Davis	4:46
2.	"Medley: O Holy Night / We Three Kings Of Orient Are / Deck the Halls with Boughs of Holly"	Adolphe Adam, John Henry Hopkins Jr., Traditional	7:39
3.	"Ring Christmas Bells"	Mykola Leontovych, Minna Louise Hohman	2:30
4.	"Medley: Let It Snow! Let It Snow! Let It Snow! / Count Your Blessings (Instead of Sheep) / We Wish You a Merry Christmas"	Sammy Cahn, Jule Styne, Irving Berlin, Traditional	5:14
5.	"The Twelve Days of Christmas"	Traditional	4:18
6.	"Medley: The First Noel / Hark! The Herald Angels Sing / O Come, All Ye Faithful / We Wish You a Merry Christmas"	Traditional, Charles Wesley	6:13

== Charts ==
Chart (1962)	Peak position
US Billboard Top LPs	32
UK Albums Chart	12
