= Ray Conniff =

American bandleader (1916–2002)

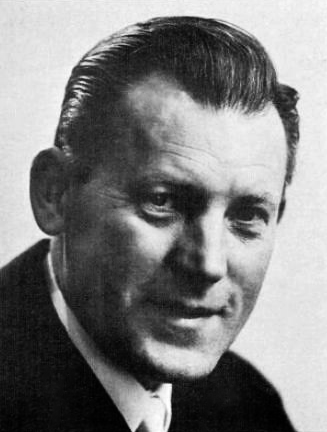
- Conniff in 1967

Background information
- Also known as: Jay Raye, Jimmy Richards
- Born: Joseph Raymond Conniff; November 6, 1916; Attleboro, Massachusetts, U.S.
- Died: October 12, 2002 (aged 85) Escondido, California, U.S.
- Genre: Big band
- Occupations: Composer, conductor
- Instruments: Trombone, vocals, whistling
- Website: www.rayconniff.info

Joseph Raymond Conniff (November 6, 1916 – October 12, 2002) was an American bandleader and arranger best known for his Ray Conniff Singers during the 1960s. He developed a unique sound taking advantage of stereo LP recording combining wordless chorus with brass and woodwinds reinterpreting American standards. The recorded sounds shifted the balance of instruments in a way that could not be heard in live performance, for example balancing a harp or rhythm guitar against a full brass ensemble.

== Biography ==
Conniff was born November 6, 1916, in Attleboro, Massachusetts, United States, and learned to play the trombone from his father. He studied music arranging from a course book.

=== Early career ===
After serving in the U.S. Army in World War II (where he worked under Walter Schumann), he joined the Artie Shaw big band and wrote many arrangements for him. After his stint with Shaw, he was hired in 1954 by Mitch Miller, head of A&R at Columbia Records, as the label's home arranger, working with several artists including Rosemary Clooney, Marty Robbins, Frankie Laine, Johnny Mathis, Guy Mitchell and Johnnie Ray. He wrote a top-10 arrangement for Don Cherry's "Band of Gold" in 1955, a single that sold more than a million copies. Among the hit singles Conniff backed with his orchestra (and eventually with a male chorus) were "Yes Tonight Josephine" and "Just Walkin' in the Rain" by Johnnie Ray; "Chances Are" and "It's Not for Me to Say" by Johnny Mathis; "A White Sport Coat" and "The Hanging Tree" by Marty Robbins; "Moonlight Gambler" by Frankie Laine; "Up Above My Head", a duet by Frankie Laine and Johnnie Ray; and "Pet Me, Poppa" by Rosemary Clooney. He also backed up the albums Tony by Tony Bennett, Blue Swing by Eileen Rodgers, Swingin' for Two by Don Cherry, and half the tracks of The Big Beat by Johnnie Ray. In these early years Conniff produced similar-sounding records for Columbia's Epic label under the name of Jay Raye (which stood for "Joseph Raymond"), among them a backing album and singles with the American male vocal group Somethin' Smith and the Redheads.

Between 1957 and 1968, Conniff had 28 albums in the American Top 40, the most famous one being Somewhere My Love (1966). He topped the album list in Britain in 1969 with His Orchestra, His Chorus, His Singers, His Sound, an album which was originally published to promote his European tour (Germany, Austria, Switzerland) in 1969. He also was the first American popular artist to record in Russia—in 1974 he recorded Ray Conniff in Moscow with the help of a local choir. His later albums like Exclusivamente Latino, Amor Amor, and Latinisimo made him very popular in Latin American countries, even more so after performing in the Viña del Mar International Song Festival. In Brazil and Chile in the 1980s and 1990s, he was treated like a young pop superstar despite being in his seventies and eighties. He played live with his orchestra and eight-person chorus in large football stadiums as well as in Viña del Mar.

Conniff commented, "One time I was recording an album with Mitch Miller – we had a big band and a small choir. I decided to have the choir sing along with the big band using wordless lyrics. The women were doubled with the trumpets and the men were doubled with the trombones. In the booth Mitch was totally surprised and excited at how well it worked." Because of the success of his backing arrangements, and the new sound Conniff created, Miller allowed him to make his own record, and this became the successful ’s Wonderful!, a collection of standards that were recorded with an orchestra and a wordless singing chorus (four men, four women). He released many more albums in the same vein, including ’s Marvelous (1957, gold album), ’s Awful Nice (1958), Concert in Rhythm (1958, gold album), Broadway in Rhythm (1958), Hollywood in Rhythm (1959), Concert in Rhythm, Vol. II (1960), Say It With Music (1960), Memories Are Made of This (1960, gold album), and ’s Continental (1962). His second album was Dance the Bop! (1957). It was an experiment by one of the senior managers at Columbia to cash in on a new dance step, but from the outset, Conniff disliked it. When it sold poorly, he had it withdrawn.

=== The Ray Conniff Singers ===
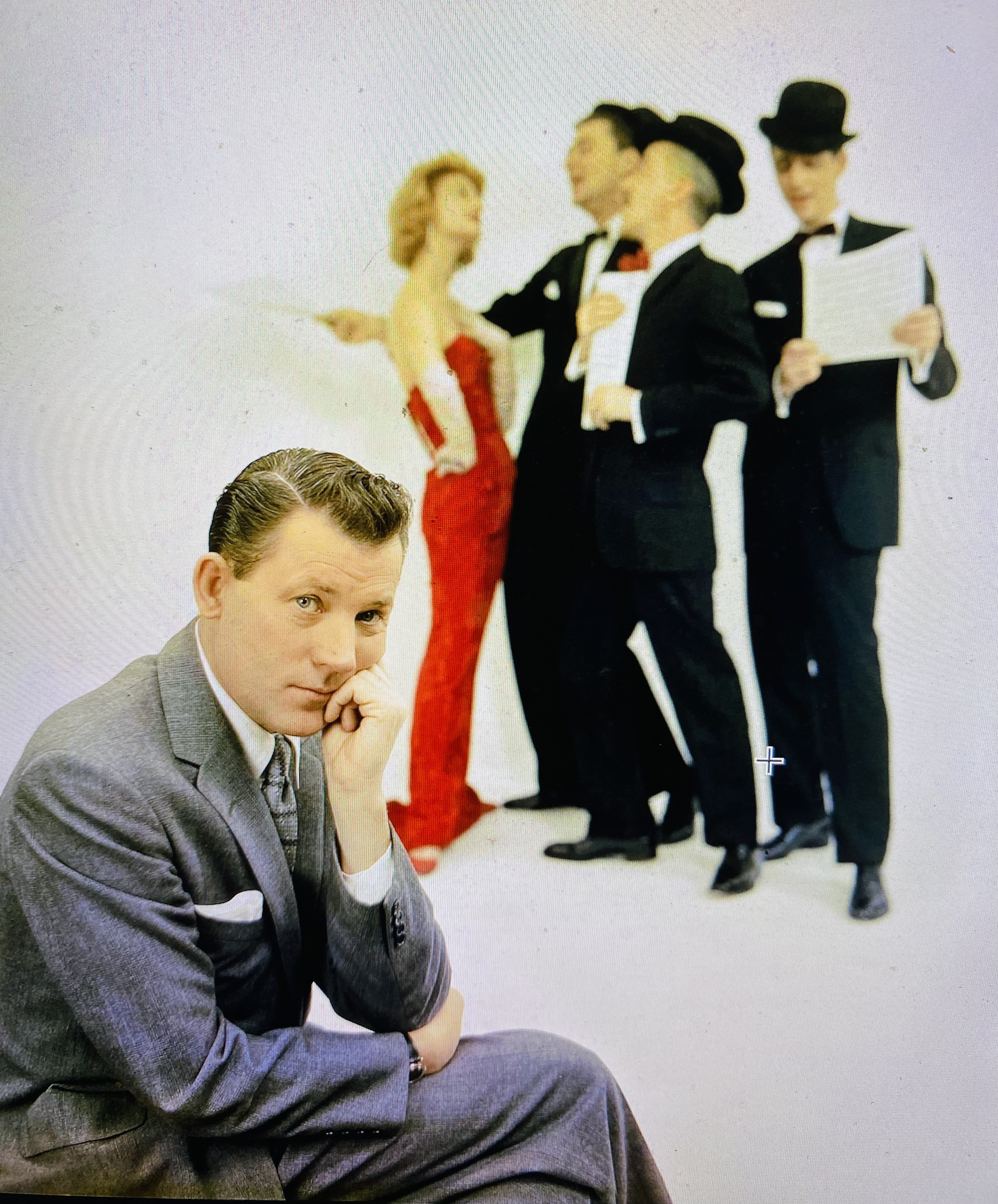
Conniff and his singers in 1958

In 1959, Conniff started The Ray Conniff Singers (12 women and 13 men) and released the album It's the Talk of the Town. This group brought him his biggest hit: "Somewhere My Love" (1966). The lyrics of the album's title track were sung to the music of "Lara's Theme" from the film Doctor Zhivago, and it became a US top 10 single.

The album reached the US top 20 and went platinum, and Conniff won a Grammy. The single and album also reached high positions in the international charts (including Australia, Germany, Great Britain, Japan), while the first of four Christmas albums by the Singers, Christmas with Conniff (1959) was also successful.

Nearly 50 years after its release, in 2004, Conniff was posthumously awarded a platinum album/CD. Other well-known releases by the Singers included Ray Conniff's Hawaiian Album (1967), featuring the hit song "Pearly Shells," and Bridge Over Troubled Water (1970), which included Conniff's original composition "Someone", and remakes of such hits as "All I Have to Do is Dream", "I'll Never Fall in Love Again", and "Something".

Musically different highlights in Conniff's career are two albums he produced in cooperation with Billy Butterfield, an old friend from earlier swing days. Conniff Meets Butterfield (1959) featured Butterfield's solo trumpet and a small rhythm group, and Just Kiddin' Around (after a Conniff original composition from the 1940s), released in 1963, which featured additional trombone solos by Ray himself. Both albums are pure light jazz and did not feature any vocals.

=== 'Stop the Killing' protest at the White House ===
On January 28, 1972, Canadian-born member of the Ray Conniff Singers Carole Feraci protested the Vietnam War during a performance at the White House in front of President Richard Nixon. Just before the performance began, Feraci displayed a sign reading “Stop the Killing” and said directly to President Nixon: “If Jesus Christ were here tonight, you would not dare drop another bomb.” Nixon, seated in the front row, remained silent with a fixed smile. Conniff apologized afterward, and Feraci was asked to leave the event. The protest brought international attention and, according to Feraci, a mixed response including phone-calls direct to her home, some supportive but the majority being hostile, including death threats.

=== Later years ===
Conniff recorded in New York from 1955 to 1961, and mainly in Los Angeles from 1962 through 2000. Later in the 1960s he produced an average of one vocal and two instrumental albums a year.

In 1979, Conniff was hired to re-arrange and record a new version of "Those Were The Days" and "Remembering You", the opening and closing themes to All in the Family for Carroll O'Connor's new spin-off, Archie Bunker's Place on CBS with a small ensemble, trombone solo, and honky-tonk piano. Conniff sold about 70 million albums worldwide, and continued recording and performing until his death in 2002.

== Death ==
Ray Conniff died October 12, 2002, in Escondido, California after falling and hitting his head on a sink. He is buried in the Westwood Village Memorial Park Cemetery in Los Angeles, California with his grave marker bearing a musical score with the first four notes of "Somewhere My Love". Conniff was survived by his wife Vera (April 7, 1944 - January 7, 2018, buried in the same plot as Ray), daughter Tamara Conniff, son Jimmy Conniff (died 2015), and three grandchildren.

== Legacy ==
In 2004, a memorial two-CD compilation set, The Essential Ray Conniff, was released, featuring many rare and previously unreleased tracks. The Singles Collection, Vol. 1 was released on the Collectables label in 2005, The Singles Collection, Vol. 2 in 2007, and Vol. 3 was released in 2009. These collections feature rare singles and previously unissued tracks. His music is also featured prominently in the movie There's Something About Mary.

In 2022, "Bah Bah Conniff Sprach (Zarathustra)", from Conniff's 1973 album You Are the Sunshine of My Life, was featured in a Salesforce television commercial starring Matthew McConaughey.

== Ray Conniff Singers membership ==
In 1959, Conniff started The Ray Conniff Singers (12 women and 13 men).

From 1962 through 2001, membership in the Ray Conniff Singers included:

Tenor
- Dick Castle (also known as Dick Kent)
- Dick Cathcart (father of Betsy Cathcart, who provided the singing voice in the Don Bluth film An American Tail)
- Jack Halloran (as in Jack Halloran Singers)
- Jay Meyer
- Verne Rowe
- Bob Shepard
- Bill Stephens
- Troy Kennedy
- Enoch Asmuth
- Dave Loucks
- Phillip Chaffin
- Scott Hoffman
- John Bähler
- Jody McBrayer
- Ron Hicklin (who also contracted the singers on 25 Ray Conniff albums)
- Jerry Whitman
- Jim Haas
- Tom Bähler
- Stan Farber
- Michael Redman

Bass and Baritone

- Paul Ely
- Wayne Dunstan
- Jimmy Joyce (as in Children's Choir), featured on "Sing" (The Carpenters song)
- Christopher Beatty
- Bill Kanady
- Bob Tebow (also sang bass with the Anita Kerr Singers on Dot & Warner Bros. labels)
- Dick Wessler
- Ted Wills
- David Theriault
- Jeff Dolan
- Phill Gold
- Gene Morford
- Gene Merlino
- Mitch Gordon

Soprano

- Jackie Allen
- Sally Stevens (wife of Dick Castle, above)
- Pat Collier
- Betty Joyce (wife of Jimmy Joyce, above)
- Loulie Jean Norman
- Myra Stephens
- Laura Savitz
- Fran Logan
- Kathy Westmoreland
- Darlene Koldenhoven
- Leana Ryan (Peggy Ryan)
- Karen Schnurr
- Rhonda Cherryholmes
- Billye Sluyter
- Robin Gray
- Kathy Mann
- Judy Murdock
- Diana Lee
- Andra Willis
- Susie McCune
- Linda Harmon
- Terry Stilwell
- Isela Rawitz

Alto

- B.J. Baker (also sang alto with the Anita Kerr Singers on Warner Bros. label)
- Vangie Carmichael
- Rica Moore (the Disney narrator)
- Marge Stafford
- Doreen Tryden
- Karen Kessler
- Erin Theriault
- Lisa Semko
- Jackie Ward (Robin Ward)
- Sandy Howell
- Carole Feraci
- Kimberly Lingo
- Anna Callahan
- Sylvia Lindsay
- Lesli Tyson
- Sue Allen
- Debbie Hall
- Myrna Matthews
- Melissa Mackay
- Nancy Adams Huddleston

== Original albums discography ==
The list below shows his studio albums only. Ray Conniff was one of the most successful easy listening artists on the Billboard magazine album chart, placing 30 albums on their Billboard Hot 200 chart up to 1973, and many of the albums charted internationally as well. Ray Conniff went on to record over 90 albums.

- 'S Wonderful! (1956)
- Dance the Bop! (1957)
- 'S Marvelous (1957, gold album)
- 'S Awful Nice (1958)
- Concert in Rhythm, Vol.1 (1958, No. 9 Hot 200, gold album)
- Broadway in Rhythm (1958) No. 10 Hot 200
- Hollywood in Rhythm (1958) No. 29 Hot 200
- It's the Talk of the Town (1959) No. 8 Hot 200, No. 15 UK
- Conniff Meets Butterfield (1959), with Billy Butterfield
- Christmas with Conniff (1959, platinum album)
- Concert in Rhythm, Vol.2 (1959) No. 13 Hot 200
- Young at Heart (1960)
- Say It with Music (A Touch of Latin) (1960)
- Memories Are Made of This (1960, gold album)
- Somebody Loves Me (1961) No. 14 Hot 200
- 'S Continental (1962)
- So Much in Love (1962, gold album)
- Rhapsody in Rhythm (1962) No. 28 Hot 200
- We Wish You a Merry Christmas (1962, platinum album)
- The Happy Beat of Ray Conniff, His Orchestra and Chorus (1962) No. 20 Hot 200
- Just Kiddin' Around (1962), with Billy Butterfield No. 85 Hot 200
- You Make Me Feel So Young (1963) No. 73 Hot 200
- Speak to Me of Love (1963) No. 50 Hot 200
- Friendly Persuasion (1964) No. 141 Hot 200
- Invisible Tears (1964) No. 23 Hot 200
- Love Affair (1965) No. 54 Hot 200
- Music From 'Mary Poppins', 'The Sound of Music', 'My Fair Lady' & Other Great Movie Themes (1965) No. 34 Hot 200
- Here We Come A-Caroling (1965, platinum album)
- Happiness Is (1965) No. 80 Hot 200
- Somewhere My Love and Other Great Hits (1966, platinum album) No. 3 Hot 200, No. 34 UK
- Ray Conniff's World of Hits (1966) No. 78 Hot 200
- En Español (The Ray Conniff Singers Sing It in Spanish) (1966) No. 180 Hot 200
- This Is My Song (1967) No. 30 Hot 200
- Ray Conniff's Hawaiian Album (1967) No. 39 Hot 200
- It Must Be Him (1967, gold album) No. 25 Hot 200
- Honey (1968, gold album) No. 22 Hot 200
- Turn Around Look at Me (1968) No. 69 Hot 200
- I Love How You Love Me (1969) No. 101 Hot 200
- Ray Conniff's Greatest Hits (1969) No. 158 Hot 200
- Live Europa Tournee 1969/Concert in Stereo (1969)
- Jean (1969) No. 103 Hot 200
- Concert In Stereo: Live at 'The Sahara Tahoe' (1969) No. 177 Hot 200
- Bridge Over Troubled Water (1970) No. 47 Hot 200, No. 30 UK
- We've Only Just Begun (1970) No. 120 Hot 200
- Love Story (1970) No. 98 Hot 200, No. 34 UK
- Great Contemporary Instrumental Hits (1971) No. 177 Hot 200
- I'd Like to Teach the World to Sing (1971) No. 138 Hot 200, No. 17 UK

- Love Theme from 'The Godfather' (1972) No. 114 Hot 200
- Alone Again (Naturally) (1972) No. 180 Hot 200
- I Can See Clearly Now (aka Clair) (1973) No. 165 Hot 200, No. 39 UK
- Ray Conniff in Britain (1973)
- You Are the Sunshine of My Life (1973) No. 176 Hot 200, No. 41 AUS
- Harmony (1973) No. 194 Hot 200, No. 61 AUS
- The Way We Were (1973)
- Ray Conniff Plays Carpenters (1974)
- The Happy Sound of Ray Conniff (1974)
- Ray Conniff in Moscow (1974)
- Laughter in the Rain (1975)
- Another Somebody Done Somebody Wrong Song (1975)
- Love Will Keep Us Together (1975)
- Ray Conniff Plays The Beatles (1975)
- I Write the Songs (1975)
- Live in Japan (1975)
- Send in the Clowns (1976)
- Theme from 'SWAT' and Other TV Themes (1976)
- After the Lovin' (1976)
- Exitos Latinos (1977)
- Ray Conniff Plays the Bee Gees and Other Great Hits (1978)
- I Will Survive (1979)
- The Perfect '10' Classics (1980)
- Exclusivamente Latino (1980)
- Siempre Latino (1981)
- The Nashville Connection (1982)
- Musik für Millionen (partly produced for a German TV show in 1982)
- Amor Amor (1982)
- Fantastico (1983)
- Supersonico (1984)
- Christmas Caroling (1984)
- Campeones (1985)
- Say You Say Me (1986)
- 30th Anniversary Edition (1986)
- Always in My Heart (1987)
- Interpreta 16 Exitos De Manuel Alejandro (1988)
- Ray Conniff Plays Broadway (1990)
- 'S Always Conniff (1991)
- Latinisimo (1993)
- 40th Anniversary (1995)
- Live in Rio (aka Mi Historia) (1997)
- I Love Movies (1997)
- My Way (1998)
- 'S Country (1999)
- 'S Christmas (1999)
- Do Ray Para O Rei (2000)

== Spinoffs ==
A special version of the song "Happiness Is" was recorded for use in a TV commercial for Kent cigarettes, prior to the ban on TV advertising of tobacco products.

== Songs composed by Conniff ==
- "I Don't Love Nobody but You" (1956)
- "Unwanted Heart" (1956)
- "A Girl Without a Fella" (1956)
- "Please Write While I'm Away" (1956)
- "Love Her in the Morning" (1956)
- "No Wedding Today" (1956; under pseudonym, "Engberg")
- "There's a Place Called Heaven" (1956; under pseudonym, "Engberg")
- "Three Way Love" (1957)
- "Walkin' and Whistlin" (1957)
- "Grown Up Tears" (1957)
- "Steel Guitar Rock" (1957)
- LP Dance the Bop! (1957; all titles)
- "Ann's Theme" (1957; under pseudonym, "Engberg")
- "(If 'n' You Don't) Somebody Else Will" (1957)
- "Just a Beginner in Love" (1957)
- "Window Shopping" (1957)
- "Soliloquy of a Fool" (1957; co-written)
- "When We're All Through School" (1957)
- "Make It Baby" (1957/58)
- "Let's Walk" (1957/58)
- "Lonely for a Letter" (1958)
- "Early Evening (Theme from the Ray Conniff Suite)" (1958)
- "Let's Be Grown Up Too" (1958)
- "Pacific Sunset" (1958)
- "A Love is Born" (1959)
- "Stay" (1959; co-written)
- "Will You Love Me" (1959; co-written)
- "African Safari" (1961)
- "To my Love" (1962)
- "Just Kiddin' Around" (1963; composed in the 1930s)
- "Scarlet" (1963)
- "Love Has No Rules" (1963)
- "The Real Meaning of Christmas" (1965)
- "Midsummer in Sweden" (1966)
- "The Power of Love" (1969)
- "Everybody Knows" (1970)
- "Someone" (1970)
- "With Every Beat of My Heart" (1971)
- "A Man Without a Vision" (1972; co-written with Robert Pickett and Fred Sadoff)
- "Here Today and Gone Tomorrow" (1973)
- "Frost Festival" (1973)
- "Ecstasy" (1974)
- "Ray Conniff in Moscow" (1974)
- "I Need You Baby" (1975)
- "Love Theme from an X-Rated Movie", also titled "Duck Walk" and "Love Dance" (1975)
- "Vera's Theme" (1976)
- "Dama Latina" (1977)
- "The 23rd Psalm" (1979)
- "Exclusivamente Latino" (1980)
- "Fantastico" (1983; co-written)
- "Supersonico" (1984)
- "Campeones" ("The Champions") (1985)
- "I Can Do All Things (Through Christ Which Strengthenth Me)" (1986)
- "Tamara's Boogie" (1996)
- "Turn to the Right" (1996)

== See also ==
- List of jazz arrangers
