= The Cat in the Window (The Bird in the Sky) =

Single by Petula Clark

from the album The Other Man's Grass Is Always Greener
- B-side: "Fancy Dancin' Man"
- Released: 1967
- Recorded: 1967
- Genre: Pop
- Length: 1:55
- Label: Pye 7N 17377 (UK); Vogue VN 1009 (US); Pye STU 42296 (DEN)
- Songwriters: Garry Bonner, Alan Gordon
- Producers: Charles Koppelman and Don Rubin

Petula Clark singles chronology
"Don't Sleep in the Subway" (1967)	"The Cat in the Window (The Bird in the Sky)" (1967)	"The Other Man's Grass Is Always Greener" (1967)

"The Cat in the Window (The Bird in the Sky)" is a song with words and music by Garry Bonner and Alan Gordon which was a 1967 single for Petula Clark.

== Background ==
In the spring of 1967, Clark had had her biggest hit ever with "This is My Song" her first single since "Downtown" in 1964. Clark had then cut the These Are My Songs album with producer Sonny Burke, reuniting with Hatch only for one track "Don't Sleep in the Subway", a strong follow-up to "This Is My Song".

For her next album, Clark proceeded with no planned involvement from Hatch. Clark continued to work with Burke but as his productions tended to be intensely easy listening, she signed with Koppelman-Rubin Associates, a Los Angeles-based music publishing and independent production company, to provide her with material with more Top 40 appeal. The submissions to Charles Koppelman and Dan Rubin for consideration for Clark to record included two songs: "Who Got the Credit" and "Bus Driver is a Fruit Cake" which if deemed suitable for Clark - which they weren't - would have been the first songs placed by Walter Becker and Donald Fagen.

Eventually Koppelman-Rubin had Clark record a song by their staff writers Gary Bonner and Alan Gordon: "The Cat in the Window (The Bird in the Sky)". Bonner and Gordon had been signed as Koppelman-Rubin house writers on the strength of penning the Turtles' No. 1 hit "Happy Together" and had recently placed songs with Gary Lewis and the Playboys, the Mojo Men, Gene Pitney and the Righteous Brothers. "The Cat in the Window..." was reportedly written with Clark in mind; the song was also cut by the Turtles whose version had no contemporaneous release. (Note: The Turtles recording "Cat in the Window" was first released on the 1970 album The Turtles! More Golden Hits.)

Recorded by Clark at Wally Heider Studios, "The Cat in the Window..." is a brief (at 1:55) track richly orchestrated with strings and flutes - Jack Nitzsche arranged the session - difficult to categorize by specific musical genre. The lyrics have the singer empathize with a cat ("with a tear in his eye") seemingly eager to "fly out the window, go where the wind goes" like the birds flying by. Resolving to "glide to a rainbow off where the clouds go dancing by," she ends with the plaintive comment, "You won't find me . . . don't even try to." Another Bonner/Gordon composition: "Fancy Dancin' Man", was recorded to serve as the track's B-side.

During her September 1967 sessions at United Western Recorders, Clark would also record Bonner and Gordon's composition "Happy Together" which was later included in her 1969 Just Pet album.

== Chart performance ==
Released in August 1967, "The Cat in the Window..." charted at No. 26 on the Billboard Hot 100. In the UK "The Cat in the Window..." afforded Clark her lowest chart showing since her 1964 breakout with "Downtown" with a No. 66 peak (No. 16 in Record Mirror's Bubbling Under List for 20 September 1967). The single's only evident chart showing outside the US was in Australia at No. 19.

Plans for further collaboration between Clark and Koppelman-Rubin were scrapped (Note: Clark did record at least one more track for Koppelman-Rubin: another Bonner/Gordon composition entitled "Nana". The track remains unreleased.) and the singer reunited with Hatch for the follow-up single: "The Other Man's Grass is Always Greener", which would fail to buoy her chart fortunes with a No. 31 peak. The twelfth of Clark's fifteen consecutive US Top 40 hits, "The Cat in the Window..." is evidently the least remembered, being the only one to register no nostalgic radio airplay as of 2011's Broadcast Marketing Research.
