= Petula (album) =

Studio album by Petula Clark
- Released: September 1968 (USA)
- Genre: Pop
- Label: Pye Records (U.K.) (U.S.)
- Producer: Tony Hatch

Petula Clark chronology
| The Other Man's Grass Is Always Greener (1968) | Petula (1968) | Petula Clark's Greatest Hits, Vol 1 (1968) |

Singles from Petula
- 1. "Kiss Me Goodbye" Released: 1968; 2. "Don't Give Up" Released: 1968

Petula is a 1968 Pye Records album release by Petula Clark leased to Warner Bros. in the USA.

The two albums precedent to Petula: These Are My Songs and The Other Man's Grass Is Always Greener had been primarily produced by Sonny Burke with Tony Hatch, the producer/songwriter who'd established Clark as a top recording star in 1964, contributing only one track to each album. With Petula Hatch again became Clark's exclusive producer overseeing all the album's tracks. Petula would prove to be the last Petula Clark album of original material produced by Hatch.

The first advance single from Petula: the Les Reed/Barry Mason composition "Kiss Me Goodbye" had reached #15 US in April 1968, becoming the first hit single for Clark produced but not written by Hatch. Of the eleven additional tracks which would comprise Petula, seven were written by Hatch and Jackie Trent. Hatch also had Clark cover "Days", "The Good Life" and "This Girl's in Love with You" and recorded Clark singing "Why Can't I Cry" which had been written by arranger Johnny Harris and wife Kim Clark. The song was also recorded by Tom Jones.

The Hatch/Trent composition "Don't Give Up" - described by Hatch as a homage to "Can't Take My Eyes off You" - was released as the album's second advance single in July 1968 and failed to sustain Clark's Top 20 comeback peaking at #37 on the Billboard Hot 100 becoming Clark's final US Top 40 hit.^{2} "Billboard" reported that "Don't Give Up" was one of the most requested tunes at Las Vegas' Desert Inn Sky Room as of late 1968 and early 1969. Singer-pianist Murray Arnold claimed it was behind only "Didn't We" and "Little Green Apples."

The track "Have Another Dream On Me" was referred to as "my latest" by Clark on her April 1968 NBC TV special. For reasons unclear, the song never came out on single, but "Don't Give Up" did.

Petula rose significantly higher on the US album charts than the preceding The Other Man's Grass Is Always Greener reaching #51 as opposed to #93.

Clark's UK label Pye Records released the album in the UK and Ireland (cat# NPL 18235) and also in New Zealand (cat# NSPL 18235). In France the Petula album was issued by Vogue Records with cat# CLD 723.

- ^{1}The titles of the singles "Kiss Me Goodbye" and "Don't Give Up" were displayed with the name "Petula" on the album's cover but the official title of the album is simply Petula.
- ^{2}"Don't Give Up" ranked in the Top 30 in both Cash Box and Record World with respective peaks of #27 and #23. The track reached #5 on Billboard's Easy Listening chart.

== Track listing ==
Side one

1. "Don't Give Up"
2. "Have Another Dream on Me"
3. "Your Love is Everywhere"
4. "One in a Million"
5. "Beautiful in the Rain"
6. "This Girl's in Love with You" (Burt Bacharach, Hal David)

Side two

1. "Kiss Me Goodbye" (Les Reed, Barry Mason)
2. "Sun Shines Out of Your Shoes"
3. "We're Falling in Love Again"
4. "Days" (Ray Davies)
5. "Why Can't I Cry" (Kim Clark, Johnny Harris)
6. "The Good Life" (Sacha Distel, Jack Reardon)

Unless otherwise indicated songwriting credit is to Tony Hatch and Jackie Trent.
