= The Grass Is Always Greener (disambiguation) =

The Grass Is Always Greener is an album by Barbara Morgenstern.

The Grass Is Always Greener may also refer to:

- "The Grass is Always Greener", episode 24 of The Brady Bunch
- "Grass Is Always Greener", a song by Jake Owen, featuring Kid Rock, from Greetings from... Jake

== See also ==
- The Other Man's Grass Is Always Greener (album), 1968 album by Petula Clark
  - "The Other Man's Grass Is Always Greener", 1967 single by Petula Clark
- The Grass Is Greener (disambiguation)
