= The Other Man's Grass Is Always Greener =

Single by Petula Clark

from the album The Other Man's Grass Is Always Greener
- B-side: "At the Crossroads"
- Released: November 1967 (U.S.)
- Recorded: 1967
- Genre: Pop
- Length: 2:55
- Label: Pye 7N 17416 (UK); Warner Bros. Records S 1719 (U.S.)
- Songwriters: Tony Hatch and Jackie Trent
- Producer: Tony Hatch

Petula Clark singles chronology
"The Cat in the Window (The Bird in the Sky)" (1967)	"The Other Man's Grass Is Always Greener" (1967)	"Kiss Me Goodbye" (1968)

Official audio
- "The Other Man's Grass Is Always Greener" on YouTube

"The Other Man's Grass Is Always Greener" is a song written by Tony Hatch and Jackie Trent which was a 1967-68 hit for Petula Clark.

== Background ==
After working exclusively with producer/songwriter Tony Hatch following their 1964 breakout collaboration "Downtown", Clark had had her most successful single ever in the spring of 1967 with "This Is My Song", a Charlie Chaplin composition recorded by Clark with producer Sonny Burke.

The resultant These Are My Songs album was also produced by Burke with Hatch contributing only one track albeit the one selected as the follow-up single: "Don't Sleep in the Subway". Despite that single's success Clark proceeded to record her next album without Hatch's involvement again working with Burke except for the track "The Cat in the Window (The Bird in the Sky)" which was released as an advance single in August 1967.

"The Cat in the Window (The Bird in the Sky)" at #26 became Clark's lowest charting US single to that date and missed the UK Top 50 entirely, causing Clark to reunite with Hatch for a track to be added to her album as the title track and to serve as a second advance single. This track: "The Other Man's Grass Is Always Greener" — which Hatch says contains "a lot of deep thought [and] a lot of philosophy... [Clark] enjoyed singing those kind of songs" — was musically similar to "Don't Sleep in the Subway" but failed to approach that hit's success, reaching only #31 on the Hot 100 in Billboard for the last week of December 1967 and the first week of January 1968. The song did best on the Easy Listening chart, where it reached a peak of number three. In the UK "The Other Man's Grass (Is Always Greener)" - so entitled - spent six weeks in the Top 30 with a #20 peak on the UK chart dated January 16, 1968.

The original Billboard magazine review of the song raved that "The team of Clark-Hatch and Trent combines talents once again for this blockbuster rhythm item that should rapidly rise to the top. Well written material and winning performance."

Clark would again bypass Hatch for her next single: "Kiss Me Goodbye", which would return her to the US Top 20. Conversely in the UK, "The Other Man's Grass (Is Always Greener)" would remain Clark's final Top 20 hit as "Kiss Me Goodbye" would just reach #50, effectively ending Clark's career as a mainstream hitmaker. (Note: Except for the #10 remix re-issue of "Downtown" in 1988)

In Australia, "The Other Man's Grass Is Always Greener" reached #30 while in South Africa the track achieved a #19 chart peak.

Clark's recording of "The Other Man's Grass Is Always Greener" plays under the opening credits of the 1997 film Twin Town, and is likewise utilized in the 2013 mini-series Power Games: The Packer-Murdoch War broadcast by Nine Network (Aus.).

The song has also been recorded by Ed Ames and Vikki Carr.

== Chart history ==
Chart (1967–68)	Peak position
Australia (Go-Set)	23
Australia (Kent Music Report)	29
Canada RPM Top Singles	12
South Africa (Springbok)	19
UK Singles Chart	20
U.S. Billboard Hot 100	31
U.S. Billboard Adult Contemporary	3
U.S. Cash Box Top 100	28
