= Kiss Me Goodbye (song) =

Single by Petula Clark

from the album Petula
- B-side: "I've Got Love Going For Me"
- Released: February 1968
- Recorded: 1968
- Genre: Easy Listening
- Length: 3:59
- Label: Pye (UK); Warner Bros (US)
- Songwriter: Les Reed/Barry Mason
- Producer: Tony Hatch

Petula Clark singles chronology
"The Other Man's Grass Is Always Greener" (1967)	"Kiss Me Goodbye" (1968)	"Don't Give Up" (1968)

"Kiss Me Goodbye" is a Les Reed/Barry Mason composition recorded in 1968 by Petula Clark.

== Background ==
After recording the Reed/Mason composition "The Last Waltz" for her 1967 album The Other Man's Grass Is Always Greener, Clark had rendered that song as "La derniere valse" for release in France to serve as the follow-up to her #1 hit "C'est Ma Chanson".The success of "La derniere valse", which reached #2 in France in January 1968, encouraged Clark to record another original Reed/Mason composition, "Kiss Me Goodbye".

The recording session took place at Pye Studios in Marble Arch and was produced by Tony Hatch, although the arranging/conducting duties were assigned to Les Reed, who played piano; the track also featured Big Jim Sullivan on guitar. Hatch also produced the B-side, "I've Got Love Going For Me', a composition by Clark herself, with Hatch's then former assistant Johnny Harris as arranger/conductor.

== Reception ==
Released in February 1968, "Kiss Me Goodbye" rose swiftly up the Billboard Hot 100 to enter the Top 20 at #16 on the chart dated 23 March 1968 representing a considerable comeback for Clark whose last two U.S. singles had been Top 20 shortfalls. However, "Kiss Me Goodbye" would rise no higher than #15 — although the track was ranked as high as #12 in Cash Box and #10 in Record World) — and would mark Clark's final appearance in the Top 30 of the Billboard Hot 100 where the follow-up "Don't Give Up" would peak at #37. ("Don't Give Up" would peak at respectively #27 and #23 in Cash Box and Record World: in all three trades it would be Clark's last Top 40 hit.)

The Billboard magazine review of the single stated: "Miss Clark has another 'This is My Song' in this beautiful ballad, penned, arranged, and conducted by Les Reed. Exceptional performance is matched by Tony Hatch's production work." Warner Brothers advertised the single in both Billboard and Cash Box with the line "Continuing the industry's most enduring affair of the chart."

In the UK, "Kiss Me Goodbye" just reached the Top 50 dated 9 March 1968, effectively punctuating Clark's British hitmaking career.

In Belgium "Kiss Me Goodbye" almost afforded Clark her final #1 hit on the chart for any major territory, rising as high as #2 on the Flemish hit parade, its ascendancy blocked by another Reed/ Mason number: "Delilah" recorded by Tom Jones leaving "Don't Sleep in the Subway" as Clark's final #1 hit, based on "Don't Sleep in the Subway" having topped the Australian chart. "Kiss Me Goodbye" also afforded Clark a hit on Belgium's Francophone chart with a #13 peak.

"Dis-moi au revoir", Clark's rendering of "Kiss Me Goodbye" for the French market (with lyrics by Pierre Delanoë), rose as high as #15 on the hit parade for France. Clark also recorded a German-language rendering (with lyrics by Hans Bradtke) which retained the original English-language title "Kiss Me Goodbye", and this version reached #36 in Germany, Clark's final chart single there (except for the 1988 remix of "Downtown"). In Italy, a version which retained the lyric "kiss me goodbye", but otherwise featured Italian lyrics written by Misselvia, was released as "Kiss Me, Goodbye" and assisted by the Clark's performance on Italian television provided the singer with her final Italian chart entry at #26.

"Kiss Me Goodbye" reached #12 in Australia becoming Clark's last Top 20 hit of the 1960s in that nation. In Malaysia "Kiss Me Goodbye" matched the #2 chart peak it had achieved on the Flemish hit parade.

"Kiss Me Goodbye" was included on the album Petula released September 1968.

== Charts ==
Chart (1968)	Peak position
Australia	12
Belgium (Ultratop 50 Flanders)	2
Belgium (Ultratop 50 Wallonia)	15
Canada Top Singles (RPM)	10
Netherlands (Dutch Top 40)	26
UK Singles (Official Charts)	50
New Zealand	21
US Billboard Hot 100	15
US Adult Contemporary (Billboard)	2

== 1988 remake ==
Kiss Me Goodbye 88
Regional chart	Peak #
BELGIUM Wallonia	18
NETHERLANDS	13

Having remade "Kiss Me Goodbye" and several other hits for her 1986 Jango CD Give It a Try, Clark cut the similarly styled This Is My Song Album for the Dutch Dino label in 1988 and that album's version of "Kiss Me Goodbye" - entitled "Kiss Me Goodbye 88" - became a hit in the Netherlands reaching #13 that spring remaining the most recent appearance of a first-time release by Clark on a major singles chart until "Downtown" by the Saw Doctors featuring Petula Clark reached #2 on the Irish chart in December 2011. (In the autumn of 1988 Clark did have an international hit with "Downtown 88" which was a remix of the original 1964 recording of "Downtown".)

== Other versions ==
In 1968, Jim Nabors covered "Kiss Me Goodbye" for an album on which it served as title cut. That same year the song was featured on albums by Ray Conniff (Honey), Michele Lee (L. David Sloane), Gary Puckett and the Union Gap (Young Girl) and Inga Sulin (fi) (in Finnish as "Suutele Minua Hyvästiksi") (Niinkuin Jokainen). Also in 1968, The Mystics (Hong Kong pop group) covered it on their LP album Now, and Ana Štefok (hr) recorded a Croatian rendering of "Kiss Me Goodbye" entitled "Poljubi me za kraj".

Connie Francis recorded "Kiss Me Goodbye" for her Connie Francis Sings the Songs of Les Reed album which featured Reed as producer and pianist; the album was released in November 1969. Also in 1969 Karel Gott recorded a Czech rendering of "Kiss Me Goodbye" entitled "Zpátky Si Dám Tenhle Film".

Virginia Lee (af) recorded "Kiss Me Goodbye" for her 1970 album Poem of Love.

Red Hurley and the Nevada had a #1 hit on the Irish charts in 1971 with a remake of "Kiss Me Goodbye": released that October, this version reached #1 on 18 November 1971 returning to #1 on 2 December 1971. ("Kiss Me Goodbye" by Red Hurley and the Nevada was succeeded at #1 on the Irish charts by another local version of a Top 50 UK hit for Petula Clark, specifically "I Don't Know How to Love Him" by Tina & Real McCoy.)

Bamse remade "Kiss Me Goodbye" for his 1977 album release Din Sang, himself writing lyrics for a Danish rendering entitled "Kys Mig Farvel."

Wendy Van Wanten (nl) had a #4 hit on Belgium's Flemish chart in 1995 with her version of "Kiss Me Goodbye" which retained the English title for a Dutch rendering of the song by lyricist Yvan Brunetti.

The 2007 compilation album Try to Remember by Heidi Brühl features the singer's version of "Kiss Me Goodbye" recorded in 1969 with the Les Humphries (de) Orchestra.

"Kiss Me Goodbye" has been a favored cover version item for Cantopop singers, having been recorded by Josephine Siao Fong Fong (EP Fong Fong Sings Hits 1968), the Chopsticks (album All of a Sudden/ 1971), Chelsia Chan (album Dark Side of Your Mind/ 1975), Tracy Huang (album Mississippi/ 1977), Susan Wong (album These Foolish Things/ 2005), and Irene Ryder (date unknown - on compilation album The Legend/ 1998).
