= John Townley =

American musician, astrologer, and naval historian

- Born: August 17, 1945 (age 81); Washington, D.C.

John Townley (born 1945) is a musician, astrologer, and naval historian who was a member of the folk-rock group The Magicians and founder of New York City's Apostolic Recording Studio. Townley performs and releases maritime music, and is a professional astrologer who has published eight books on the subject.

== Biography ==
=== Early life and education ===
Townley's parents, who were former owners of Beekman Place Bookshop in Manhattan, lived in Rancho Santa Fe, California when Townley was just beginning school. Opposed to the California education system's adoption of the whole-word recognition system to teach reading, the family relocated to Port Lavaca, Texas, where they began living on a boat and homeschooling Townley for over two years as they sailed from the Bahamas to New England, eventually settling in the Miami neighborhood of Coconut Grove.

In the 1960s, Townley discovered folk music and began playing guitar. He later left college to move to New York City's Greenwich Village to study guitar with Reverend Gary Davis, eventually becoming Davis' driver in order to pay for guitar lessons. Townley immersed himself in the Greenwich Village folk music scene, associating with Peter La Farge, David Crosby, Fred Neil, and Vince Martin at establishments like The Gaslight Cafe and Kettle of Fish.

=== Career ===
In 1965 Townley was trying to make a living as a musician, working with various artists, including Peter Tork, David Blue, and Jay Ungar. He was approached by Allan "Jake" Jacobs to record a B-side for Alan Gordon and Garry Bonner. Gordon and Bonner's band, Tex and the Chex, had recently lost two band members and signed a recording contract with Columbia Records. Jacobs and Townley joined the band, which was renamed The Magicians, but left in 1966.

In August of the same year, Townley turned 21 and came into an inheritance of $85,000. Inspired by two DMT-facilitated psychedelic visions, he decided to establish an independent recording studio in Greenwich Village that would be very different from what he previously experienced recording under the somewhat rigid corporate practices of Columbia Recording Studio. Townley invested in a building at 53 East 10th Street and outfitted it with the first recording console designed and built by API co-founders Lou Lindauer and Saul Walker, along with a prototype 1" 12-track Scully tape recorder. Apostolic Recording Studio opened in 1967, its name alluding to its capabilities as the first 12-track studio in New York City.

In the 1970s, Townley developed an interest in maritime music. He began visiting the South Street Seaport and singing with others aboard the ships there, resulting in the "X-Seamen's Institute" quartet. Townley moved to Virginia and worked for the Mariners' Museum. He continued to perform maritime music professionally and has recorded and produced several albums in that genre. He also performed with other sea shanty bands, including "The Press Gang".

Townley received his first astrology chart from astrologer Al H. Morrison, and provided office space for Morrison on the 6th floor of Apostolic Recording Studio's building in exchange for doing readings for the studios' clients. Townley later became a professional astrologer, later publishing eight books on the subject. He also served as President of the Astrologers’ Guild of America.

== Personal life ==
Townley's first wife was Gilma (Gilly). Their daughter, Dierdre, is pictured on the cover of the studio's 1968 2-disc LP The Family of Apostolic. Townley later married Christine.
