= Green Grass =

Green Grass may refer to:

- Green Grass, South Dakota, community in South Dakota
- "Green Grass" (song), song by Gary Lewis & the Playboys
- "Green Grass", song by Tom Waits on Real Gone (album)
- Green Grass (nuclear warhead), used on British nuclear weapon Yellow Sun

== See also ==
- Greengrass, surname
- Greengrass Productions, production company
- Green Green Grass (disambiguation)
