= Apostolic Recording Studio =

American recording studio in New York City

Coordinates: 40°43′56″N 73°59′31.5″W

Apostolic Studios was an American independent recording studio located at 53 East 10th Street in New York City's Greenwich Village. Established in 1967 by John Townley, Apostolic was the first 12-track studio in New York. Artists recording at the studio included Frank Zappa and The Mothers of Invention, Larry Coryell, Allen Ginsberg, and The Fugs.

== History ==
Townley, who had moved to New York City to study guitar with Reverend Gary Davis, was immersed in the mid-1960s Greenwich Village music community, associating with Peter La Farge, David Crosby, Fred Neil, and Vince Martin, and working with various artists, including Peter Tork, David Blue, and Jay Ungar before becoming a member of The Magicians in 1965. In August 1966 Townley turned 21 and came into an inheritance of $85,000. Inspired by two DMT-facilitated psychedelic visions, he decided to leave The Magicians and establish an independent recording studio in Greenwich Village that would be very different from what he previously experienced recording under the somewhat rigid corporate practices of Columbia Recording Studio.

Townley invested in a building at 53 East 10th Street and partnered with Matt Hoffman and Weiss jewelry fortune heirs Michael and Danny Weiss to remodel its 2-story loft space into a recording studio. Lou Lindauer, who would go on to co-found API with Saul Walker, not only advised the construction of the new studio, but designed and built the recording console, which featured a separate performers' cue system that provided the monitoring necessary for facilitating overdubs—a feature not common on mixing consoles at that time. Townley convinced Scully to produce a prototype 1" 12-track tape recorder. Four additional tracks allowed for more recording flexibility than the 1" 8-track recorders that were state of the art at the time. Apostolic Recording Studio opened in 1967, its name alluding to its capabilities as the first 12-track studio in New York City.

Access to the studio was via a freight elevator, whose 6-story elevator shaft was painted with a blacklight mural by Nic Osborn, who dressed in a Viking costume and worked as the studio's elevator operator. The building's six-story stairwell was utilized as a live reverb chamber in addition to the studio's plate reverb.

Apostolic Studios' independent, non-corporate style attracted numerous artists to record there, including Frank Zappa and The Mothers of Invention, the Grateful Dead, Larry Coryell, Allen Ginsberg, and The Fugs.

In 1968, the studio produced The Family of Apostolic, a two-disc LP composed of performances from a variety of artists affiliated with the studios. Townley's daughter Diedre is pictured on the front cover of the album, and a young Aida Turturro is pictured among a collage of numerous pictures of children on the back album cover.

In March 1969, Townley returned to his original musical inspiration when he persuaded Reverend Gary Davis to his first recording studio session in five years. The resulting album, O, Glory – The Apostolic Studio Sessions would be Davis' final studio album, released posthumously in 1973.

In 1968, Townley opened Pacific High Studios in San Francisco as a West Coast counterpart to Apostolic. Apostolic Recording Studio and Pacific High Studios both went out of business in the early 1970s as a result of over-expansion and an economic recession.

== Legacy ==
Tony Bongiovi, who would go on to found the Power Station, worked as a recording engineer at Apostolic in 1967. Other engineers who began their career at Apostolic Studios include Gary Kellgren and John Kilgore.
