= The Grass Is Greener (disambiguation) =

The Grass Is Greener is a 1960 film starring Cary Grant.

The Grass Is Greener may also refer to:

- The Grass Is Greener (play), a 1956 play by Hugh and Margaret Williams; basis for the 1960 film
- Grass Is Greener, a 2019 documentary film
- The Grass Is Greener (festival), an annual Australian music festival
- The Grass Is Greener (album) or the title song, by Colosseum, 1970
- "The Grass Is Greener" (song), by Brenda Lee, 1963
- "Beddy Bye/The Grass is Greener", episode 33 of The Fairly OddParents

== See also ==
- The Grass Is Always Greener (disambiguation)
- The Other Man's Grass Is Always Greener (album), 1968 album by Petula Clark
  - "The Other Man's Grass Is Always Greener", 1967 single by Petula Clark
