= Green Green Grass =

Green Green Grass may refer to:

- "Green Green Grass" (song), by George Ezra
- "Green, Green Grass of Home", a song popularised by Tom Jones
- Green, Green Grass of Home (album), by Tom Jones
- Green Green Grass by the River, a Taiwanese television drama
- The Green Green Grass, a British sitcom
- The Green, Green Grass of Home, a Taiwanese film.

== See also ==
- Green Grass (disambiguation)
- The Grass Is Greener (disambiguation)
