= The Other Man's Grass Is Always Greener (album) =

Studio album by Petula Clark
- Released: 1 January 1968
- Genre: Pop
- Label: Pye Records (UK); Warner Bros. Records (U.S.)
- Producer: Sonny Burke, Charles Koppelman, Don Rubin, Tony Hatch

Petula Clark chronology
These Are My Songs (1967)	The Other Man's Grass Is Always Greener (1968)	Petula (1968)

Singles from The Other Man's Grass Is Always Greener
- 1. "The Cat in the Window (The Bird in the Sky)" Released: 1967; 2. "The Other Man's Grass Is Always Greener" Released: 1967

Professional ratings
Review scores
Source	Rating
Allmusic	3/5 stars

The Other Man's Grass Is Always Greener is the ninth album released by Petula Clark in the United States. It entered the Billboard 200 on February 17, 1968 and remained on the charts for 23 weeks, peaking at #93. It fared better in the United Kingdom, where it reached #37.

After collaborating with producer/songwriter Tony Hatch on nine US Top 40 hits, Petula Clark had begun to work independently of Hatch in 1966 collaborating with Sonny Burke on "This is My Song" which would become Clark's most successful global hit in the spring of 1967: Burke also oversaw the resultant These Are My Songs album although that album did feature one Clark/Hatch collaboration: "Don't Sleep in the Subway" which would provide Clark with a further Top Ten hit.

Clark's next single: "The Cat in the Window (The Bird in the Sky)" was produced by Charles Koppelman and Don Rubin, and was released in August 1967 as the first advance single for what would become Clark's The Other Man's Grass is Always Greener album, although as "The Cat in the Window..." shaped up to become Clark's first US Top Twenty shortfall since she'd reached #1 with "Downtown" in 1965 plans for Clark to record an entire album with Koppelman/Rubin were scrapped and in September 1967 Clark reunited with the producer Sonny Burke, and also "This is My Song" arranger Ernie Freeman, to record the nucleus of her next album release at Western Studios (Los Angeles) with the Wrecking Crew session players.

The tracks which Sonny Burke had Clark record included his own composition: "Black Coffee", which had helmed the iconic 1953 debut album by Peggy Lee: Black Coffee, which Petula Clark would eventually describe as "my Bible. I knew every note [Peggy Lee] sang, every note of the orchestrations." Clark would add that she herself "really shouldn't have touched" the song "Black Coffee". Burke also had Clark record "Smile", the signature composition by Charlie Chaplin, writer of "This is My Song" - ; the current Engelbert Humperdinck hit "The Last Waltz"; the 1953 Frankie Laine hit "Answer Me, My Love"; and the Lerner & Loewe showtune "I Could Have Danced All Night". Burke also produced the only French language track to be included on a non-Francophone album by Petula Clark: "L'île de France", which Clark herself wrote with lyricist Pierre Delanoë.

With Burke's output seemingly too easy listening focused to yield the comeback single Clark required it was felt expedient to reunite the singer with Tony Hatch to produce a second advance single "The Other Man's Grass is Always Greener", as song written by Hatch with Jackie Trent which would eventually serve as the title cut for Clark's January 1968 album release. "The Other Man's Grass is Greener" would in fact become Clark's second consecutive US Top 30 shortfall peaking at #31 on the Hot 100 in Billboard for the last week of December 1967 and the first week of January 1968. The single fared better in the UK - where its title was formatted as "The Other Man's Grass (is Always Greener)" - spending six weeks in the Top 30 with a #20 peak on the UK chart dated January 16, 1968.

== Track listing ==
Side one

1. "Smile" (Charlie Chaplin, John Turner, Geoffrey Parsons)
2. "Black Coffee" (Sonny Burke, Paul Francis Webster)
3. "The Last Waltz" (Les Reed, Barry Mason)
4. "Answer Me, My Love" (Fred Rauch, Gerhard Winkler, Carl Sigman)
5. "The Other Man's Grass Is Always Greener" (Tony Hatch, Jackie Trent) (Produced by Tony Hatch)
6. "Today, Tomorrow" (Norman Gimbel, Caetano Veloso)

Side two

1. "I Could Have Danced All Night" (from My Fair Lady) (Frederick Loewe, Alan Jay Lerner)
2. "At the Crossroads" (from Doctor Dolittle) (Leslie Bricusse)
3. "L'ile de France" (Petula Clark, Pierre Delanoë)
4. "The Cat in the Window (The Bird in the Sky)" (Garry Bonner, Alan Gordon) (Produced by Charles Koppelman and Don Rubin; arranged by Jack Nitzsche)
5. "For Love" (Al Grant)
6. "Ballad of a Sad Young Man" (Francis Landesman, Tommy Wolf)
