= Black Coffee (1948 song) =

1948 song by Sonny Burke and Paul Francis Webster

"Black Coffee" is a song with music by Sonny Burke and words by Paul Francis Webster. The song was published in 1948.

Sarah Vaughan charted with this song in 1949 on Columbia; arranged by Joe Lipman, it is considered one of the most notable versions.

Peggy Lee recorded the song on May 4, 1953, and it was included on her first LP record Black Coffee.

It was included in the soundtrack for the 1960 Columbia Pictures feature Let No Man Write My Epitaph, recorded on Verve by Ella Fitzgerald, also in 1960. The version by Ella Fitzgerald was a favourite song of Polish Nobel Prize laureate Wisława Szymborska who chose it as the song to be performed at her funeral.

== Relationship to song "What's Your Story, Morning Glory?" ==
"Black Coffee"'s first two measures are nearly identical to Mary Lou Williams' 1938 piece "What's Your Story Morning Glory", and both songs share melodic motifs drawn from blues (including a strong melodic emphasis on the flat third and flat seventh intervals, known as "blue notes"). Williams felt that Burke and Webster plagiarized her composition, and reportedly considered taking legal action over the matter. The two songs have significant melodic and rhythmic differences after the first two measures of their respective 'A' sections, and "Black Coffee" has a unique bridge section that has no parallel in "Morning Glory". However, during her piano solo, Williams plays both the identical feel and harmonies that appear on "Black Coffee," with dominant chords moving up and down by half steps in lieu of staying on the tonic chord. While not a carbon copy, Burke and Webster arguably picked sections of "What's Your Story Morning Glory" to string together to create a new song. Coincidentally, jazz trumpeter Paul Webster (no relation to lyricist Paul Francis Webster) was given co-writer credit for "Morning Glory" by Williams when she published her song in 1938.

== Other recordings ==
Other versions of "Black Coffee" were performed by:

- Ann Richards on a single release with Stan Kenton (1955)
- Martha Hayes on her album A Hayes Named Martha (1956)
- Pat Suzuki on her self-titled album Pat Suzuki (1958).
- Ray Charles on his album The Great Ray Charles (1957)
- Duke Pearson on his album Profile (1959)
- Bobby Darin on his album This is Darin (1960)
- Julie London – Around Midnight (1960), The Ultimate Collection (2005)
- Chris Connor – Double Exposure (with Maynard Ferguson) (1961)
- Jane Morgan - on her album What Now My Love? (1962).
- Earl Grant on his albums Midnight Sun (1962) and In Motion (1968)
- Rosemary Clooney on her album Thanks for Nothing (1964)
- Sonny Criss – This Is Criss (1966)
- Ruth Brown on the Thad Jones/Mel Lewis album The Big Band Sound of Thad Jones/Mel Lewis featuring Miss Ruth Brown (1968)
- Petula Clark on her album The Other Man's Grass Is Always Greener (1968)
- The Pointer Sisters on the album That's a Plenty (1974)
- Roseanna Vitro on her debut album Listen Here (1984)
- Janis Siegel on the album At Home (1987)
- Vivian Lord on the album Route 66 (1987)
- k.d. lang on the album Shadowland (1988)
- Carmen McRae on the album Sarah: Dedicated to You (1991)
- Sinéad O'Connor on the album Am I Not Your Girl? (1992)
- Diane Schuur on her covers album In Tribute (1992)
- Elkie Brooks on her album Round Midnight (1993)
- Stanford Fleet Street Singers on their album What You Want (1994)
- Patricia Kaas on her album Café Noir (1996)
- Martina Topley-Bird and Tricky on the album Nearly God (1996)
- Alexia Vassiliou on her album In a Jazz Mood (1996)
- Mary Coughlan on "Red Blues" album (2002)
- Claire Martin on her album Too Darn Hot (2002)
- Maria Muldaur on her album A Woman Alone With The Blues (2002)
- Nana Mouskouri on her live album Nana Swings (2003)
- Canned Heat on "Friends in the Can" album (2003)
- Kimiko Itoh on her album Once You've Been in Love (2004)
- Barbara Lusch on Spotify (2004)
- Marianne Faithfull for her album Easy Come, Easy Go (2008)
- Anita Eccleston on her album Anita Eccleston Jazz EP (2011)
- April Hall on her album Room for Two (2012)
- Caroll Vanwelden on her album Don't Explain (2013)
- Clare Maguire on her EP Clare Maguire (2014)
