= Disc cutting lathe =

Device for creating master phonograph discs

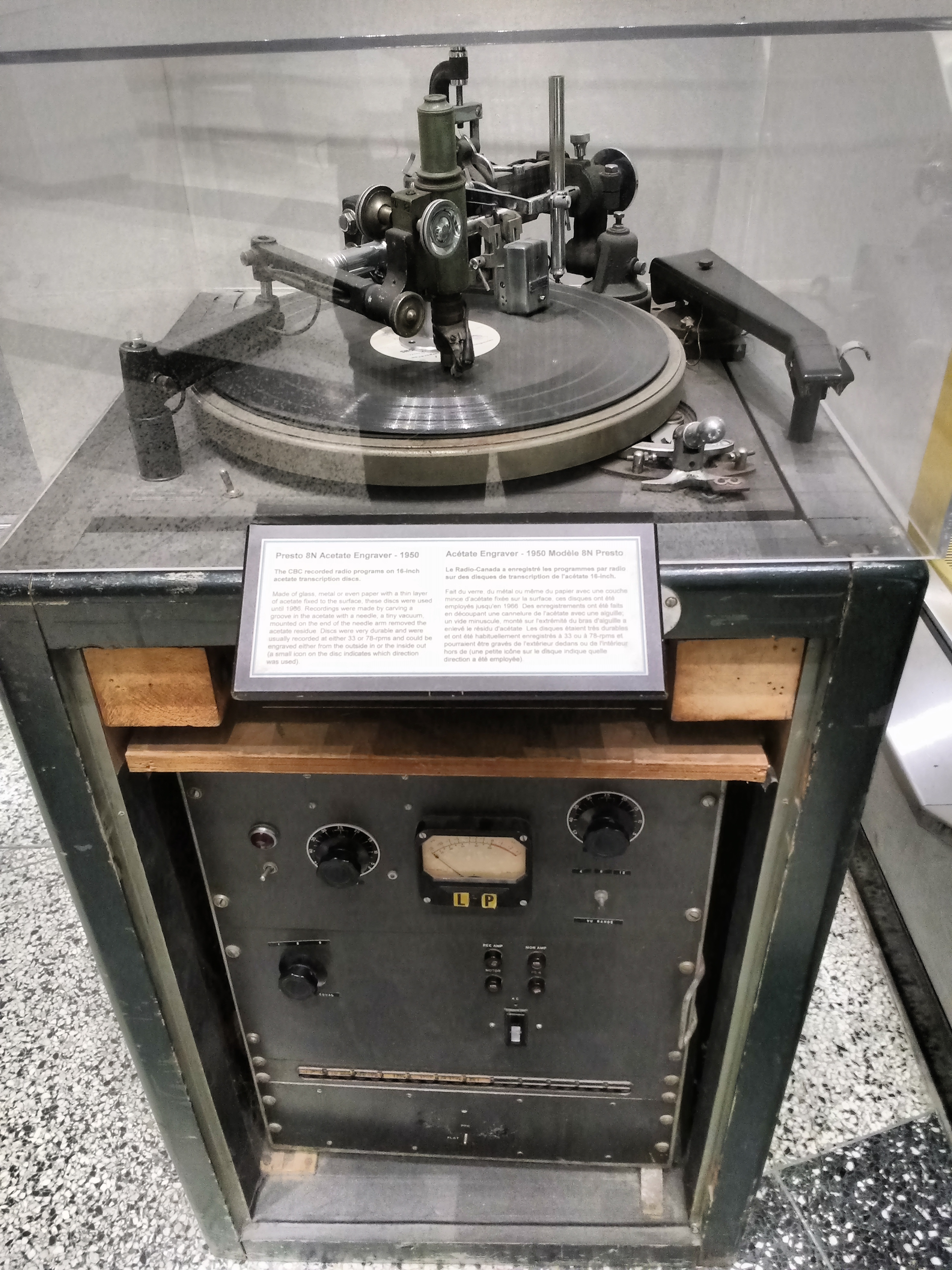
Presto 8N Disc Cutting Lathe (1950) used by the Canadian Broadcasting Corporation to record radio programs

A disc cutting lathe is a device used to transfer an audio signal to the modulated spiral groove of a blank master disc for the production of phonograph records. Disc cutting lathes were also used to produce broadcast transcription discs and for direct-to-disc recording.

== Overview ==
Disc cutting lathes utilize an audio signal, sent through a cutting amplifier to the cutter head, which controls the cutting stylus. The cutting stylus engraves a modulated spiral groove corresponding to the audio signal into the lacquer coating of the master disc. The direct metal mastering (DMM) process uses a copper-coated rather than lacquer-coated disc. Before lacquer discs, master recordings were cut into blank wax discs.

Once complete, this master disc is used to produce matrices from which the record is pressed. For all intents and purposes, the finished record is a facsimile of this master disc.

== History ==
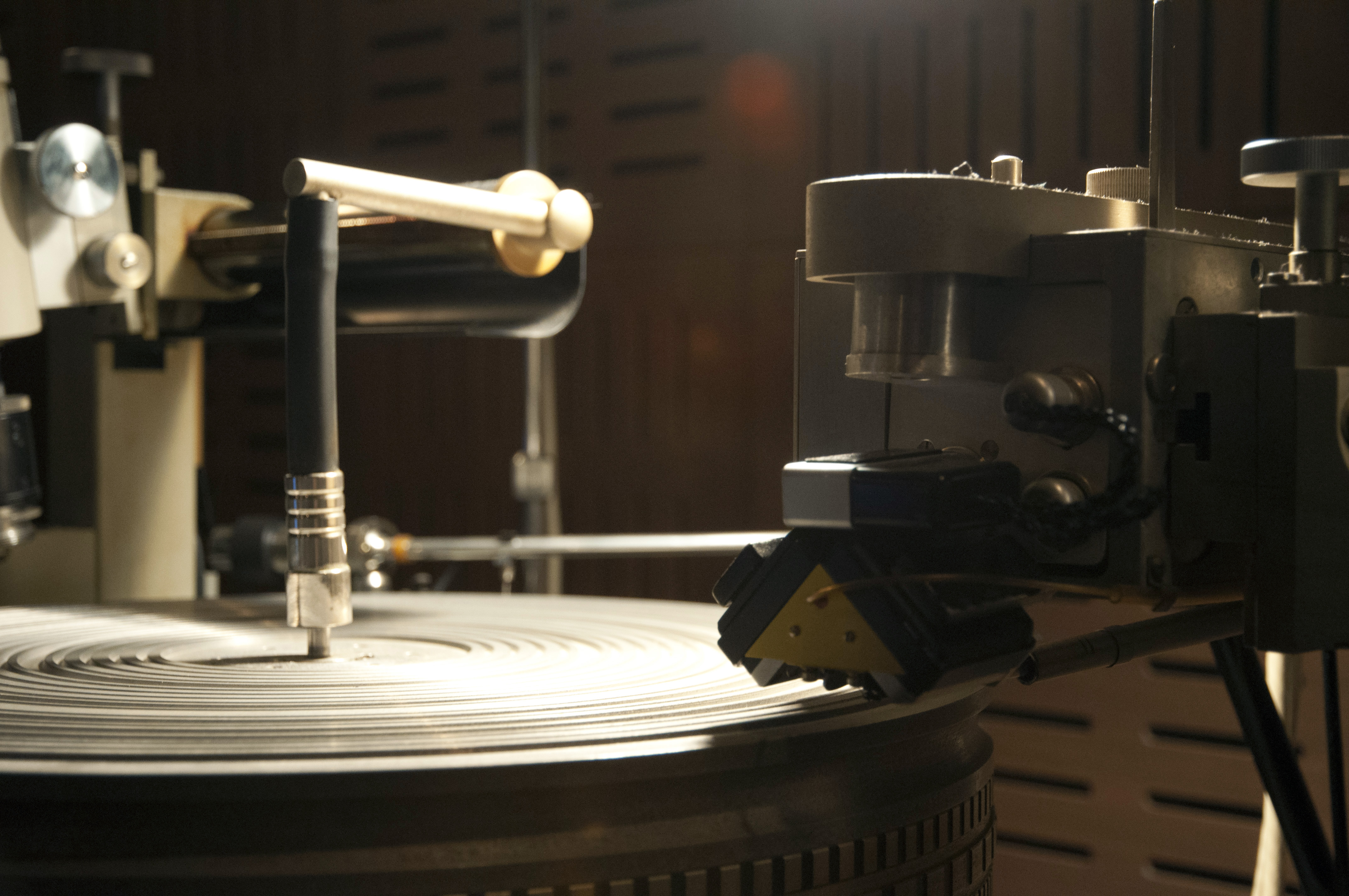
Neumann VMS70 disc cutting lathe (with SX74 cutter head)

Prior to the success of Western Electric's "Westrex" system, master discs were produced acoustically and without electricity. In 1921, John J. Scully, a former Columbia Phonograph Company employee, designed and built a weight-driven lathe specifically designed for use by phonograph manufacturers. The first Scully lathe was sold to Cameo Records. John's son, Lawrence, founded Scully Recording Instruments.

In 1924, Western Electric purchased a Scully weight-driven lathe to demonstrate their "Westrex" cutter head and electronics for both the Columbia Phonograph Company and Victor Talking Machine Company. Both companies began using the Westrex system for recording sessions in 1925 after agreeing to license the system from Western Electric.

In 1931, German manufacturer Georg Neumann & Co. introduced the AM31 disc-cutting lathe, which employed a direct-drive design. Two years later, Neumann introduced a portable lathe capable of making recordings on location. Imports of Neumann lathes into the United States were restricted, however, and Neumann lathes were not imported to the United States until the 1960s. Scully dominated the U.S. marketplace for professional recording lathes from the 1930s to the 1960s, and almost all American lacquer masters were cut using a Scully lathe, often fitted with the Westrex cutter head and electronics.

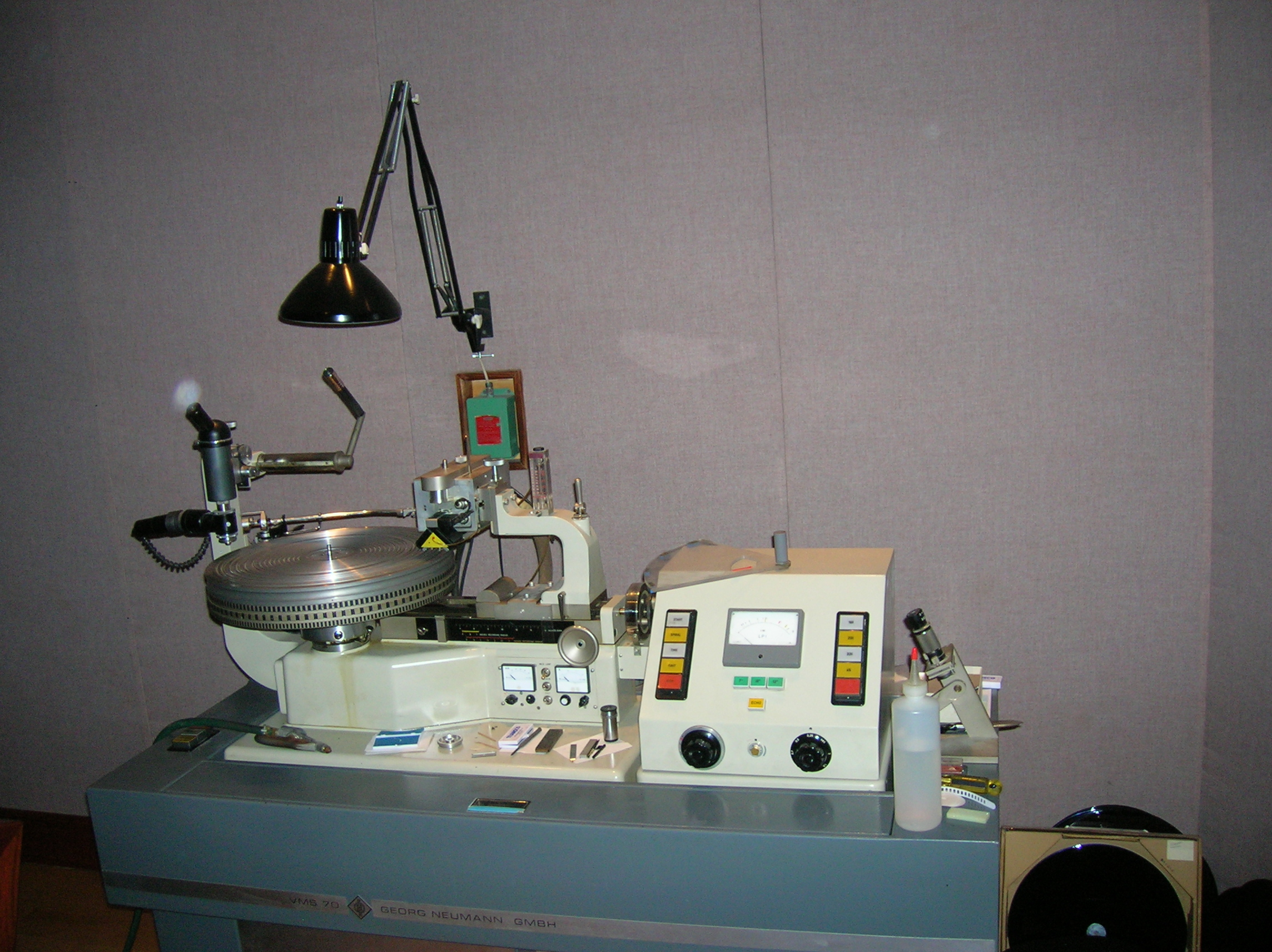
Neumann VMS70 disc cutting lathe

In 1947, the Presto 1D, Fairchild 542, and Cook feedback cutters represented major improvements in disc-cutting technology. In 1950 Scully Recording Instruments introduced a disc cutting lathe with variable pitch, which made it possible to vary the width of the grooves (i.e. the pitch) of a master disc, simultaneously conserving the available recording space of the disc while preserving the dynamics and fidelity of the recorded material. Five years later, the company introduced automation for this variable pitch feature.

In 1957, Westrex demonstrated the first commercial "45/45" stereo cutter head.

In 1966, Neumann introduced the VMS66, followed by the VMS70 (1970) and the VMS80 (1980), which introduced variable pitch to Neumann's offerings, reducing speed fluctuations to achieve smoother sound and extended dynamic range. Unlike other systems, Neumann's disc cutting system was complete and included the lathe, cutter head, and electronics.
