= The Chopsticks =

1960-70s HK female musical duo

- Origin: Hong Kong
- Genre: Hong Kong English pop
- Years active: 1960s–1970s
- Past members: Sandra Lang (仙杜拉); Amina (阿美娜)

Chinese name
- Chinese: 筷子姊妹花
Transcriptions
Standard Mandarin
- Hanyu Pinyin: kuàizi zǐmèi huā
- IPA: [kʰwâɪtsɹ̩ tsɹ̩̀mêɪ xwá]
Yue: Cantonese
- Jyutping: faai3 zi2 zi2 mui6 faa1
- IPA: [faj˧tsi˧˥ tsi˧˥muj˨ fa˥]

The Chopsticks was a short-lived female duo in Hong Kong consisting of Sandra Lang and Amina. They were the first all-female modern music singing group to be marketed and launched from Hong Kong.

They started singing in the late 1960s with HK English pop songs and were contracted with the local Crown Records between 1969 and 1972, having a release total of four LP albums and not more than 10 SP/EPs. In 1973, the duo split and both Sandra Lang and Amina went solo.

== Discography ==
Issue Number	Album Title	Song List
ESSP-1222 (SP) 1970	The Chopsticks Sandra Amina	Medley: Can't Buy Me Love, Love Potion No. 9, Satisfaction (John Lennon/Paul McCartney, Jerry Leiber/Mike Stoller, Mick Jagger/Keith Richards); Stop! In The Name Of Love (Brian Holland/Lamont Dozier/Edward Holland)
ESEP-4004 (EP) 1970	Sooner Or Later	Sooner Or Later (Noel Quinlan); Medley: To Sir With Love, San Francisco, Bala Bala (Don Black/Mark London, John Philips, Horst Lippok); For Your Love (Ed Townsend); Words (Noel Quinlan)
CES-1022 (LP) 1970	The Chopsticks Sandra And Amina	You Are My Sunshine (Jimmie Davis/Charles Mitchell); Yesterday (John Lennon/Paul McCartney); Stop! In The Name Of Love (Brian Holland/Lamont Dozier/Edward Holland); Medley: Can't Buy Me Love, Love Potion No. 9, Satisfaction (John Lennon/Paul McCartney, Jerry Leiber/Mike Stoller, Mick Jagger/Keith Richards); Wait Till Now (Alfred Newman); La Malaguena (Elpidio Ramírez/Pedro Galindo); Summer Time (George Gershwin/DuBose Hayward); Tears Of Love (Yao Mien/James Wong); Ko Ko Mo (Forest Gene Wilson/Jake Porter/Eunice Levy); Una Sera Di Tokyo (Miyakawa Yasushi/Iwatani Tokiko); Land Of A Thousand Dances (Chris Kenner)
CES-1023 (LP) 1970	Someday	Chopstick (Joseph Koo/Desmond Mayne); Valley Of The Dolls (André Previn/Dory Previn); Medley: To Sir With Love, San Francisco, Bala Bala (Don Black/Mark London, John Philips, Horst Lippok); A Man Like You (Desmond Mayne); The Shadow Of Your Smile (Johnny Mandel/Paul Francis Webster); Love Is Blue (André Popp/Brian Blackburn); For Your Love (Ed Townsend); Some Day (Desmond Mayne); This Is My Song (Charlie Chaplin); Mas Que Nada (Jorge Ben); Cu Cu Ru Cu Cu Paloma (Tomás Méndez)
CES-1024 (LP) 1971	If You Go Away	If You Go Away (Jacques Brel/Rod McKuen); Medley: Night And Day, A Man And A Woman, One Note Samba (Cole Porter, Pierre Elie Barough/Jerry Paul Keller/Francis Albert Lai, Antonio Carlos Jobim/Jobim/Newton Mendonça); Spinning Wheel (David Clayton-Thomas); The Joker (Leslie Bricusse/Anthony Newley); I Can't Stop Loving You (Don Gibson); Ain't No Mountain High Enough (Nickolas Ashford/Valerie Simpson); You've Made Me So Very Happy (Brenda Holloway/Patrice Holloway/Frank Wilson/Berry Gordy); Can't Take My Eyes Off You (Bob Crewe/Bob Gaudio); Close To You (Burt Bacharach/Hal David); This Girl Is a Woman Now (Alan Bernstein/Victor Millrose); You've Lost That Loving Feeling (Barry Mann/Phil Spector/Cynthia Weil)
CES-1025 (LP) 1971	All Of A Sudden	Medley: Exodus, Hava Nagila (Ernest Gold/Pat Boone, Abraham Zevi (Zvi) Idelsohn); Little Green Apples (Bobby Russell); All Of A Sudden (Don Black/Ned Nelson); Fool On The Hill (John Lennon/Paul McCartney); Medley: Aquarius, Let The Sunshine In (Gerome Ragni, James Rado/Galt MacDermot); Historia Di Un Amor (Carlos Eleta Almaran); Scarborough Fair (Art Garfunkel/Paul Simon); House Of The Rising Sun (Alan Price); Medley: Chain Of Fools, Sunny, Gimme Little Sign, Uptight (Don Covay, Bobby Hebb, Joseph Hooven/Alfred Smith/Jerry Winn/Brenton Wood, Henry Cosby/Sylvia Moy/Stevie Wonder); Kiss Me Goodbye (Barry Mason/Les Reed)
