= Sandra Lang =

- Chinese: 仙杜拉
- Born: Chinese: 梁玉姬 Lèuhng Yuhkgēi; 1943 (age 82–83)
- Other names: Sandra, Sandra Sin Do Laai, Sin Do-Laai, Sin Tao-Lai, Xian Du-La
- Occupations: Singer; actress
- Years active: 1960s–1970s (singer), 1970–1994 (acting)
- Musical career
- Origin: Hong Kong
- Genres: Cantopop, Hong Kong English pop

Chinese name
Transcriptions
Standard Mandarin
- Hanyu Pinyin: Xiāndùlā
Yue: Cantonese
- Yale Romanization: Sīndouhlā

Sandra Lang (Chinese: 仙杜拉; Cantonese Yale: Sīndouhlā, born 梁玉姬; Lèuhng Yuhkgēi) is a former Chinese Cantopop singer who was active in the 1970s and actress in Hong Kong. Lang is credited with over 25 films.

== Early life ==
In 1943, Lang was born in the United States.

== Career ==
During the late 1960s, Lang's career began as a singer in the HK English pop group named The Chopsticks. The group did not last long, as Lang soon went solo for TVB.

In 1970, Lang became an actress in Taiwanese film. Lang appeared as Linda in The Wandering Generation, a 1970 Taiwan film directed by Yang Tun-Ping. In 1974, Lang became an actress in Hong Kong film. Lang was known as Sin Do-Laai (Chinese: 仙杜拉). Lang first appeared in Hong Kong film in Fun, Hong Kong Style, a 1974 Comedy film directed by Ng Wui. Lang's last film was Family Affairs, a 1994 Comedy Drama film directed by Cheung Ji-Kok. Lang is credited with over 25 films.

In 1974, her Cantonese TV theme song "The Yuanfen of a Wedding that Cries and Laughs" (啼笑姻緣) made Cantopop the new music phenomenon. The song was aired on TVB Jade on 11 March 1974 at 7 pm. The 1974 version of the song was written by Joseph Koo.

== Filmography ==
=== Films ===
This is a partial list of films.

- 1970 The Wandering Generation - Linda
- 1974 Fun, Hong Kong Style
- 1994 Family Affairs

== Personal life ==
In 1999, Lang became a naturalized Canadian citizen.
