= Alan Gordon (songwriter) =

American songwriter

Alan Lee Gordon (April 22, 1944 – November 22, 2008) was an American songwriter best known for songs recorded by the Turtles, Petula Clark, and Barbra Streisand. Many of his songs were co-written with Gary Bonner, including the Turtles' "Happy Together" and Three Dog Night's "Celebrate".

He worked with various popular musicians, including Blues Magoos, Alice Cooper, the Archies, the O'Jays, Lynn Anderson, Flo & Eddie, Frank Zappa, Helen Reddy, Gary Lewis & the Playboys, Tammy Wynette, the Lovin' Spoonful, Bobby Darin, and Freddy Fender.

== Career ==
Gordon was born in Natick, Massachusetts. In 1965, he and Garry Bonner formed the Magicians, a group which would also include Allan "Jake" Jacobs and John Townley. They released a single in November 1965, "An Invitation to Cry". It met with some success, but their popularity was confined primarily to the New York and New England area.

Gordon co-wrote, with Bonner, "Happy Together", originally recorded by the Turtles. In 1967, the Turtles version followed The Beatles' "Penny Lane" into the #1 slot on the Billboard Hot 100 chart, spending three weeks there. It was named one of the Top 50 songs of the 20th century by BMI, having generated over 5 million performances on American radio by 1999, placing it in the same league as the Beatles' "Yesterday", and "Mrs. Robinson" by Simon and Garfunkel.

Songs from Alan Gordon's catalogue have been featured in film, television, commercials and video games. Some of the films that featured Gordon-penned songs include The Naked Gun, Muriel's Wedding, Shrek, The Simpsons Movie, 27 Dresses, and Freaky Friday. Television programs include The Simpsons, That '70s Show, ER, Scrubs, The Wonder Years, and American Idol.

Gordon died at his home in Scottsdale, Arizona on November 22, 2008, after a two-year battle with cancer. He was 64 years old.

== Singles ==
- 1965: "An Invitation To Cry" by The Magicians
- 1967: "Girls in Love" performed by Gary Lewis & the Playboys
- 1967: "Jill" performed by Gary Lewis & the Playboys
- 1967: "Happy Together" performed by The Turtles
- 1967: "She'd Rather Be with Me" performed by The Turtles
- 1967: "She's My Girl" performed by The Turtles
- 1967: "You Know What I Mean" performed by The Turtles
- 1967: "Put the Clock Back on the Wall" by the E-Types
- 1967: "As Long As You're Here" by Zalman Yanovsky (of The Lovin' Spoonful)
- 1967: "The Cat in the Window (The Bird in the Sky)" performed by Petula Clark
- 1968: "Small Talk" performed by Lesley Gore
- 1968: "Small Talk" performed by Harpers Bizarre
- 1968: "('Til I) Run With You" performed by Lovin' Spoonful
- 1969: "Celebrate" performed by Three Dog Night
- 1970: "Me About You" performed by The Turtles
- 1976: "Gladiola" performed by Helen Reddy
- 1976: "Music Is My Life" performed by Helen Reddy
- 1977: "My Heart Belongs to Me" performed by Barbra Streisand
- 1978: "Love Breakdown" performed by Barbra Streisand
- 1979: "I Ain't Gonna Cry Tonight" performed by Barbra Streisand
