= Greengrass =

Greengrass is a surname. Notable people with the surname include:

- Jessie Greengrass (born 1982), British poet and author
- Jim Greengrass (1927–2019), American professional baseball player
- John Greengrass, New Zealand rugby league footballer
- Ken Greengrass (1926–2014), American music and television producer
- Paul Greengrass (born 1955), English film director, screenwriter and former journalist

== Fictional characters ==
- Astoria Greengrass, character from J. K. Rowling's Harry Potter series
- Claude Greengrass character from the British period police drama Heartbeat

== See also ==
- Barney Greengrass, restaurant on the Upper West Side of Manhattan
