= The Magicians (band) =

American garage rock band

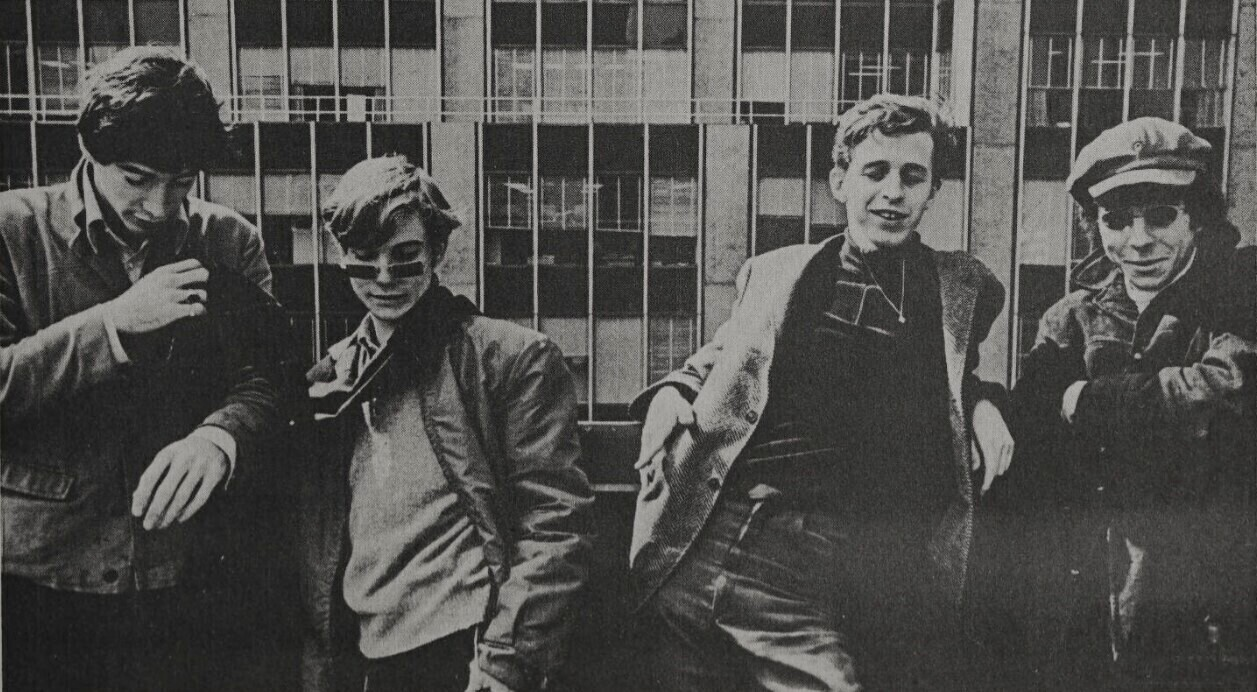
- The Magicians c. 1966

Background information
- Origin: New York City, New York, United States
- Genres: Pop rock; garage rock
- Years active: 1964-1967
- Labels: Atlantic; Columbia
- Past members: Alan Gordon; Garry Bonner; Mike Appel; Everett Jacobs; Rod Bristow; Allan "Jake" Jacobs; John Townley

The Magicians were an American garage rock band formed in New York City, New York, in 1965. The group released four singles during their brief recording career with Columbia Records, with their most well-known song being "An Invitation to Cry". Members Alan Gordon and Garry Bonner later became a successful songwriting duo, and the Magicians' material was assembled on a compilation album in 1999.

== History ==
The Magicians originated from an interracial rock group called the Tex and the Chex, which assembled a lineup consisting of Alan Gordon (drums), Everett Jacobs (bass guitar), Mike Appel (lead guitar), and Rod Bristow (lead vocals). The band performed regularly at the Cinderella club in the Greenwich Village, and released one obscure single, the Bristow-penned "My Love", on Atlantic Records, in 1964. Gordon co-wrote the song "An Invitation to Cry" with non-member, Jimmy Woods, and demoed it, after being discovered by record producers Bob Wyld and Art Polhemus, with Jacobs and Appel. However, prior to recording the song, Bristow was replaced as vocalist by Garry Bonner as a consequence of the two producers' demand of an improvement at the position. The final product of "An Invitation to Cry" was, as music historian Richie Unterberger described it, "superb moody pop/rock with a touch of blue-eyed soul, enhanced by an imaginative production highlighting ominous distorted guitar riffs, graceful tempo shifts, accomplished vocal harmonies and Bonner's anguished lead vocal". It became a regional hit, and received a wider notice when the song resurfaced on the 1972 compilation album, Nuggets: Original Artyfacts from the First Psychedelic Era, 1965–1968.

Appel departed the Tex and the Chex, later worked in the Balloon Farm, composed their hit, "A Question of Temperature", which charted at number 37, and managed Bruce Springsteen early in his career. As the band signed a recording contract with Columbia Records, Jacobs also left, and Allan "Jake" Jacobs and John Townley were added to the group, which was renamed the Magicians. The Magicians made a name for itself by replacing the Lovin' Spoonful as the house band at the Night Owl club, even gaining interest from future Mountain bassist and Cream producer Felix Pappalardi, but the addition never materialized. Two singles were released in 1966, with two cover versions of David Blue songs, yet none of the recordings manage to reach the same regional success of their debut. The Magicians were featured on a segment of the CBS program, Eye on New York—an unusual amount of exposure for a band that never was able to produce an album—and recorded more unreleased material before Jacobs and Townley left the band.

In early 1967, the group's final single surfaced with little commercial success. Gordon and Bonner were emerging as a songwriting duo, most notably for the Turtles, and already penned their hit "Happy Together". The Magicians disbanded later in the year, and their recordings were issued on the 1999 compilation album, An Invitation to Cry: The Best of the Magicians.
