= Scully Recording Instruments =

American professional audio equipment company (1919–1985)

Scully Recording Instruments Corporation
- Founded: 1919; 107 years ago
- Founder: John G. Scully, Lawrence Scully
- Defunct: 1985
- Headquarters: Bridgeport, Connecticut, United States

Scully Recording Instruments was an American designer and manufacturer of professional audio equipment for recording studios and broadcasters.

== History ==
=== Background ===
John J. Scully was a machinist who worked for sewing machine manufacturer Wheeler & Wilson before going to work for the Columbia Phonograph Company in 1904. During his employment at Columbia, Scully was put in charge of the company's experimental laboratories and improved the design of the Dictaphone. Independently of his work at Columbia, Scully designed and perfected his first disc recording apparatus in 1909. Scully left Columbia Phonograph Company in 1918 and became a technical engineer for General Phonograph Corp. for a year.

=== Recording lathes ===
In 1919, John J. Scully founded Scully Recording Instruments in Bridgeport, Connecticut as a manufacturer of disc cutting lathes. The original Scully lathe was a mechanical, weight-driven device that utilized three weights (the largest being 100 pounds) attached to pulleys connected to a turntable which revolves under a stationary cutting head. The lathe was positioned on a 5–6 foot tall pedestal to provide adequate distance for the weights to descend, their descent governed by a 7-gear transmission, driving the lathe a sufficient amount of time to cut a complete disc.

From 1919 through 1923, the company produced 1 disc cutting lathe per year. In 1921, the company sold its first Scully Recorder to Cameo Recording Corp. in New York City, and in 1924, Western Electric purchased a Scully weight-driven lathe to demonstrate their "Westrex" cutter head and electronics for both the Columbia Phonograph Company and Victor Talking Machine Company. Both companies began using the Westrex system for recording sessions in 1925 after agreeing to license the system from Western Electric.

From 1925 to 1929, Scully Recording Instruments experienced booming demand from the motion picture industry as it adopted new electronic sound recording technologies to transition from silent films to "talkies," but orders for new disc cutting lathes halted following the stock market crash. In 1933, John J. Scully's son, Lawrence J. Scully, joined the company, and the following year, RCA Victor placed the first of what would become orders for 20 disc cutting lathes purchased from Scully over the next four years.

During the remainder of the 1930s and into the 1940s, Scully disc cutting lathes were widely adopted by major American recording studios and broadcasting companies, including NBC Radio Network, who bought 36 lathes between 1938 and 1947. The company ceased recording lathe production during World War II to work on aircraft subcontracts, with the only exception being a recording lathe built in 1943 for the United States Navy's Underwater Sound Laboratory in nearby New London. After the war, orders for Scully recording lathes rolled in from Westinghouse Broadcasting, the Detroit Symphony Orchestra, General Motors, Columbia, Decca, and Capitol Records. In 1945, Mary Howard founded her own recording studio, Mary Howard Recordings, and became the first private person to own a Scully lathe, which she purchased for her own record label, MHR. The company exported recording lathes to England, France, Germany, Japan, Italy, Mexico Chile, Australia, New Zealand, the Philippines, and even Russia.

By 1950, the year that company founder John J. Scully died, his company had 10 employees. The same year, the company introduced the model 601, a disc cutting lathe with variable pitch, which made it possible to vary the width of the grooves (i.e. the pitch) of a master disc to preserve the fidelity of the recorded material while conserving the available recording space of the disc. Addition of the variable pitch feature raised the price of Scully's recording lathe from $2,500 to $7,300. In 1955, the Scully company introduced automation for this variable pitch feature, which could be included for a total price of $8,500. Scully Recording Instruments continued to dominate the U.S. marketplace for disc cutting lathes until the 1960s, and almost all American lacquer masters were cut using a Scully lathe, often fitted with the Westrex cutter head and electronics.

=== Tape recorders ===
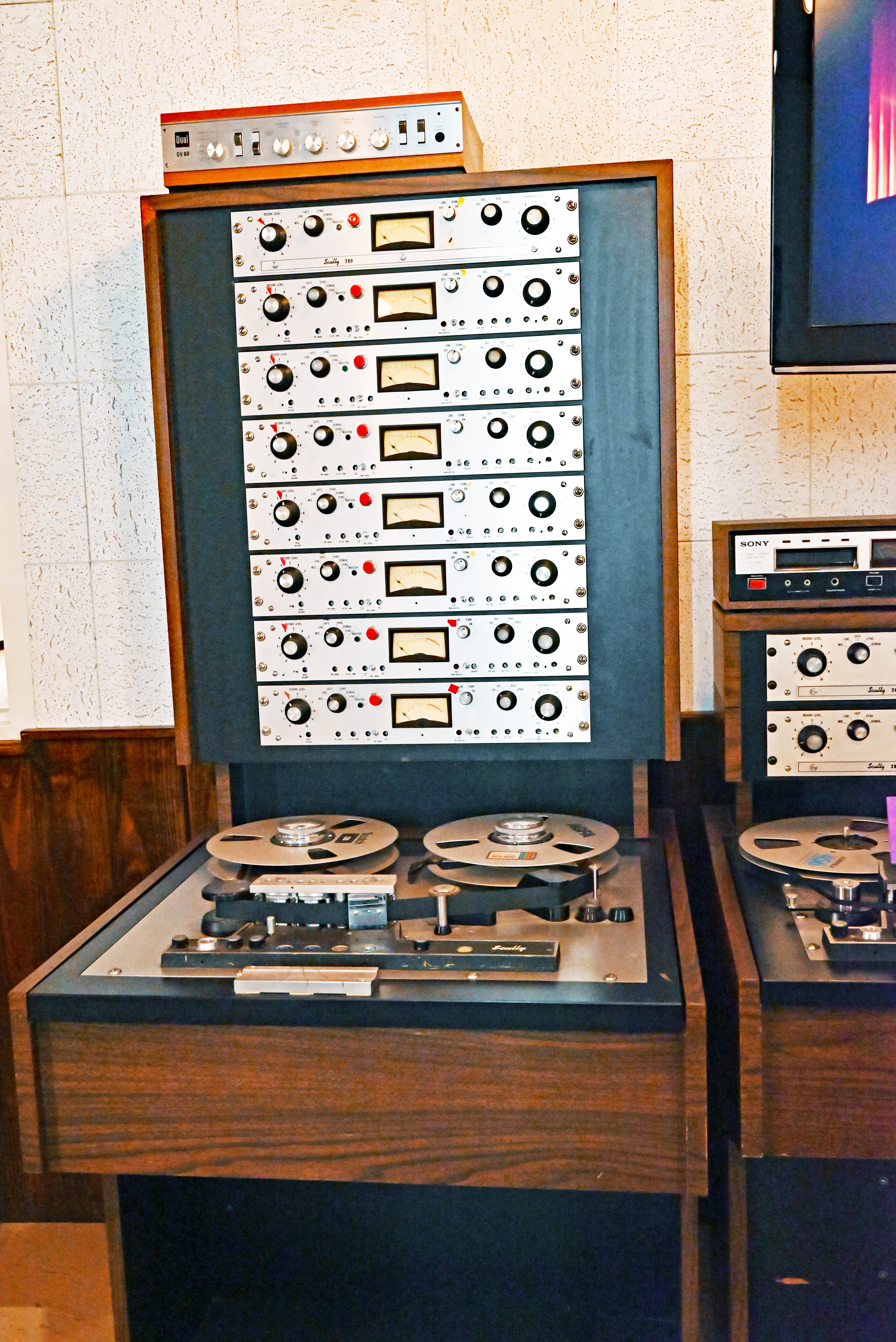
Scully 280 eight-track recorder at the Stax Museum of American Soul Music

In 1961, recognizing the limited market for professional disc cutting lathes and facing increased competition from Neumann, whose disc cutting lathes were no longer restricted from being imported to the United States, Scully Recording Instruments entered the tape recorder market. Under the direction of former Presto Recording designer Arthur Gruber, who was Scully's chief engineer and vice president from 1961 through 1968, Scully introduced the model 270, a playback-only device intended to address the needs of automated radio stations. When sales of the model 270 did not meet the company's expectations, Scully contracted Bell Sound Studios co-founder and chief engineer Dan Cronin to design a tape recorder that would utilize the parts that the company had purchased to build the model 270. The Scully model 280 was introduced in 1965, and adopted by recording studios such as Decca in London. Scully later introduced a 1/4-inch two-track recorder, then a 1/4-inch three-track recorder, and eventually a 1/2-inch four-track recorder, which became a mainstay for several years.

In 1966, as many recording studios were seeking to upgrade to eight-track capabilies, the company introduced a 1-inch eight-track recorder, the 284-8, which offered more features than the similar model from competitor Ampex, while taking up less rack space. Advision Studios installed a 284-8 in 1968, making it one of the first 8-track studios in London. By 1972, Decca was using two 284-8s, and added a third later.

In 1967 Scully introduced an innovative and unique 1-inch 12-track model, the 284-12, which was briefly popular. The first of these machines was custom built for Apostolic Studios in Manhattan and was used by Frank Zappa and The Mothers of Invention for the album Uncle Meat. The same model was quickly installed at the Record Plant in New York City and used by Jimi Hendrix, and also at Pacific High Recording in San Francisco. With more tracks, artists enjoyed increased recording flexibility. The 12-track system used a narrower track width than 8-track, which may have influenced the recording quality. Despite the narrower track width, Tom Scholz of Boston, later bought one of these machines and was thrilled with its sound quality. However, the 12-track format was overtaken by 2-inch 16-track technology, which was introduced soon after by Ampex. The 12-track Scully system also pre-dated the introduction of 2-inch 24-track recorders, which would become an industry standard for recording studios during the mid-1970s.

In 1971, the company introduced the Scully 100, a 2-inch 16-track model priced below $11,000, significantly lower than the industry-leading 3M M56's $15,000 price, but the Scully 100 was not commercially successful. Scully shifted its efforts to the broadcast market but found it to be crowded, and the company went out of business by mid-1980s. Scully's 16-track models were used by studios such as Sigma Sound in Philadelphia.

== Legacy ==
A total of approximately 600 Scully recording lathes were built, and it is estimated that less than 40 still exist, with only twenty-one of those still functional, making them extremely rare.

Prolific jazz recording engineer Rudy Van Gelder purchased a Scully model 601 recording lathe for his recording studio in 1954, and acquired a second model 601 in 1962.

In 1975, Tom Scholz purchased a used Scully 12-track machine for home demos and the initial recordings that would become the debut album by Boston.

French electronic musician Jean-Michel Jarre recorded the album Oxygène in 1976 on a Scully 8-track recorder at his home studio. As of 2016 it had sold an estimated 18 million copies and is one of the best-selling French albums in history.

Third Man Records acquired a Scully recording lathe previously used at King Records in Cincinnati, which is now used by Vance Powell for direct-to-acetate recording of live performances at the label's Blue Room venue in Nashville. Live at Third Man releases cut direct-to-acetate with the Scully lathe have been released by artists including The Shins, The Kills, Seasick Steve, Blitzen Trapper, and Billie Eilish.

Engineer Nicholas Bergh spent over 10 years assembling and restoring a vintage 1925 Scully lathe with a Western Electric amplification system used to demonstrate the first electrical sound recording system in the 2017 documentary film The American Epic Sessions.
