= Happy Together (song) =

1967 single by the Turtles

- Picture sleeve for the US single

Single by the Turtles

from the album Happy Together
- B-side: "Like the Seasons" (US/Canada/South Africa/Mexico/Denmark); "We'll Meet Again" (Japan and most of Europe); "Can I Get to Know You Better?" (Brazil); "Get Away" (Australia/New Zealand)
- Released: January 1967
- Recorded: 1966
- Studio: Sunset Sound, Hollywood
- Genre: Pop rock; psychedelic pop; sunshine pop
- Length: 2:50
- Label: White Whale
- Songwriters: Alan Gordon; Garry Bonner
- Producer: Joe Wissert

The Turtles singles chronology
| "Can I Get to Know You Better" (1966) | "Happy Together" (1967) | "She'd Rather Be with Me" (1967) |

Music video
- "Happy Together" on YouTube

"Happy Together" is a song written by Garry Bonner and Alan Gordon and recorded by the American rock band the Turtles. It was released as a single, backed with (b/w) "Like the Seasons", in January 1967, and peaked at number one on the US Billboard Hot 100, becoming the band's first and only chart-topper there. It also reached the top 20 in various countries, including number 2 in Canada and number 12 in the UK. It was later included on the Turtles' third studio album Happy Together (1967).

Bonner and Gordon composed the song while members of the Magicians. Its lyrics tell about an unrequited love albeit to a joyous melody. The composition was rejected by many artists, before being accepted by the Turtles, who were passing through a lowdown in their career. They recorded their version in the Sunset Sound studio, with the newly arrived bassist Chip Douglas arranging the horns and backing vocals.

After the song's successful release, the band was called to perform on TV shows such as The Ed Sullivan Show and The Smothers Brothers Show in 1967. Music critics have continued to praise the Turtles version for its pop qualities. It was covered by several acts, with the most successful being by the soft rock duo Captain & Tennille, and has been featured on numerous movies and TV shows. In 1999, BMI included the song in the list of the most-performed songs in the United States in the 20th century and, in 2007, it was inducted into the Grammy Hall of Fame. Howard Kaylan and Mark Volman, singers of the Turtles, were involved on various legal battles due to their attempts to copyright "Happy Together" against unauthorized broadcasts, notably with Sirius XM Radio.

== Background ==
Alan Gordon had served as the drummer and one of the primary songwriters of the Magicians, which had recently evolved from Tex & the Chex. He wrote and co-wrote a number of songs for the band, most famously "An Invitation to Cry" (with Jimmy Woods). Gordon already had many of the lyrics in mind for "Happy Together" but the chorus of the song came to him at the Park Street Diner in Ayer, Massachusetts, after visiting his father. The melody was based on the constant tuning of guitarist Allan "Jake" Jacobs during the band's concerts. After a failed attempt to convince Jacobs to write the song with him, Gordon finished it with vocalist Garry Bonner.

In 1965, Bonner and Gordon started to work with publishers Charles Koppelman and Don Rubin from the Koppelman/Rubin Associates, writing songs for artists selected by them. The songwriters cut a demo of "Happy Together" and offered it to several artists including the Happenings, the Vogues and the Tokens, but it was rejected by all of them.

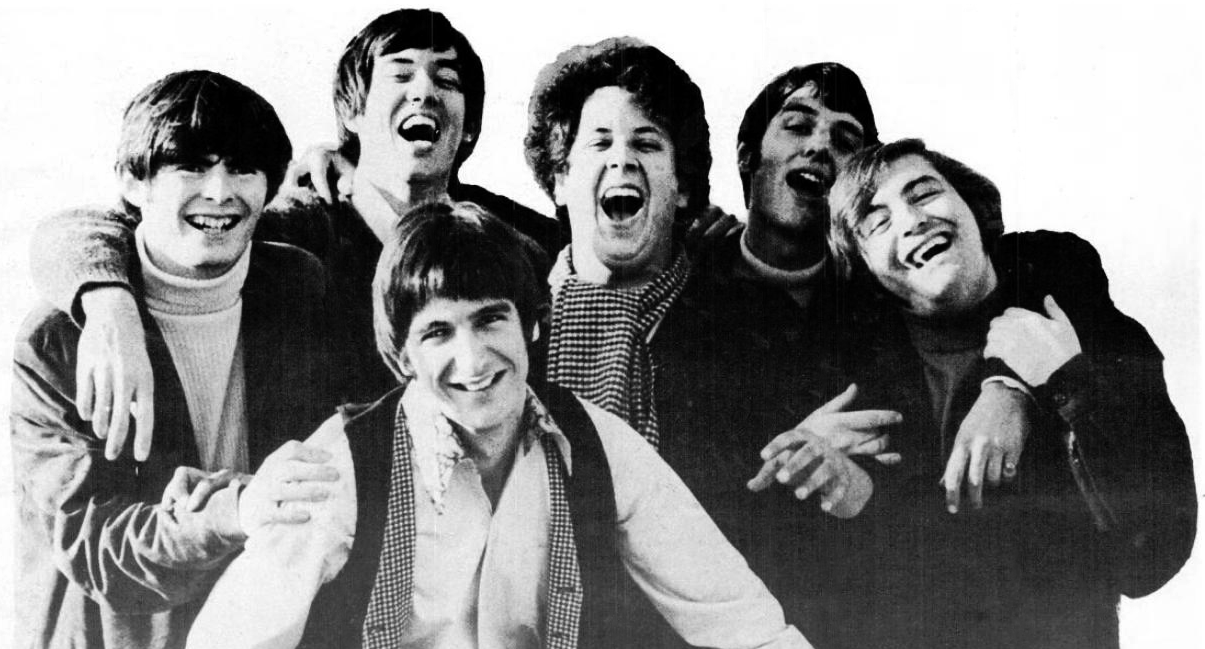
The Turtles in 1967. One of the few photos showing Chip Douglas (pictured in the upper left) with the group.

Around the same time, California band the Turtles had been struggling with financial and personal problems. After scoring three Top 40 hits in 1965 and 1966, including Bob Dylan's "It Ain't Me Babe" and "You Baby", their next five singles had not charted well. Chip Douglas and John Barbata had stepped in as replacements for the original members. As an act focused on singles, member Mark Volman explained that their lack of success almost caused the Turtles to break up.

Lead vocalist Howard Kaylan mentions in his autobiography, and in the Turtles' documentary, that the group found "Happy Together" after spending some time to listen to demos submitted by publishing companies. (Note: According to Alan Gordon's website, Koppelman/Rubin arranged for their West Coast associate, Gary Klein, to submit the demo for the Turtles' label, complementing Kaylan's version of the "publishing companies" White Whale.) Volman remembers it slightly differently, saying that, between the sets of a Manhattan gig, Bonner and Gordon themselves asked the band if they needed material, and then subsequently sent some demos that included "Happy Together". Because of its circulation to many other artists, the demo acetate was worn out and, according to Fred Bronson, "practically unlistenable", with Kaylan describing the acetate as "scratchy and sticky".

During an interview with Grammy Awards, Howard Kaylan said that, when he heard it the first time, he considered the recording to be "terrible", but later understood that the rejection by other artists was due to the performance. Kaylan recalled that the demo consisted of "one guy (Gary Bonner) strumming an acoustic guitar while the other (Alan Gordon) sings in a bizarre falsetto to get a semblance of rhythm going. Their voices were abysmal". Volman agreed with Kaylan, calling the demo "amateurish, lacking any kind of professional performance".

Conversely, Brill Building session guitarist Ralph Casale, in an interview with Songfacts affirmed that he had played on the demo and that other session musicians were involved. The performance was in a "Lovin' Spoonful feel" and praised it as much like a "finished product". (Note: Casale's recollection about the demo is possibly mistaken, according to Bonner and Gordon's supposed performance of the demo in the Turtles' documentary, also the Kaylan/Volman's version is the most cited.)

It was pretty basic, but you could tell by the melody line it was gonna be strong.

— John Barbata, 2019

Stereogum critic Tom Breihan comments that the Turtles were "hungry" for a hit and with Bonner and Gordon's song "it all fit". Volman observed:

It [the demo] only included a singer and a guitar, but we could hear the melody and chorus. We were very careful because we had had those records that had been done poorly and we needed something to be great. It could have easily been our last recording. After all, how many failures were we going to be given by a small, independent record label?

== Recording ==
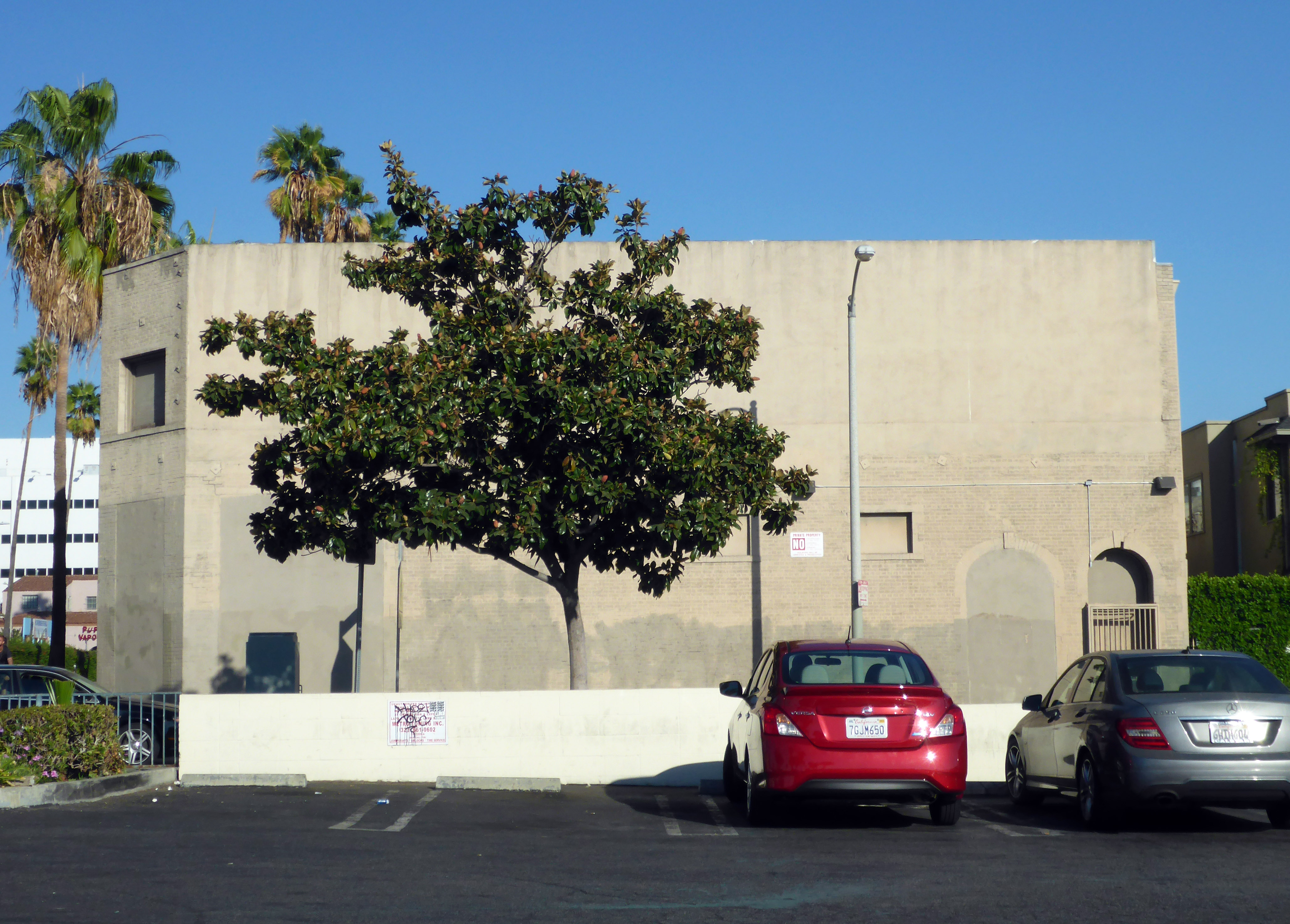
Sunset Sound was where the Turtles recorded "Happy Together".

Wanting to record the song, the Turtles had the writers travel from New York to California where Garry Bonner and Alan Gordon performed for them live at the Beverly Hills Hotel. According to Kaylan, "they sounded even worse than the demo, but it didn't matter. We wanted this song, and they and their publishers [Koppelman-Rubin] certainly wanted us to have it." The group rehearsed "Happy Together" in live performances for eight months, although music author Wayne Wadhams states the rehearsals lasted only two weeks. (Note: Based on Kaylan's statements, the Turtles found the song in April or May 1966, but Wadhams wrote that the band found the demo in early January 1967.) With the audience's response becoming very positive, the band members decided to record the song in January 1967.

Koppelman/Rubin, as the publishers of Bonner and Gordon songs, chose how "Happy Together" was going to be recorded, substituting the original producer Bones Howe with Joe Wissert, and the Turtles' familiar United Western studios with Sunset Sound, which had been the studio for emerging artists like the Doors. The "Happy Together" session was engineered by Sunset Sound regular Bruce Botnick.

As with all their previous records, the band – Kaylan, Volman, guitarists Al Nichol and Jim Tucker, bassist Chip Douglas and drummer John Barbata – played on the recording of "Happy Together" (their independent label, White Whale, could not afford LA session musicians to augment or replace them like other artists on bigger labels), while being accompanied by an orchestra of horns and woodwinds.

According to engineer Botnick, the Turtles benefited from an eight-track recorder being used. The first three tracks were for the basic instrumentation, the other three were for the vocals, and the seventh was for the orchestra overdubs. Barbata recalled that they recorded the drums, bass and guitars at the same time, and then overdubbed the vocals and the orchestra. Volman said that the band usually didn't experiment in the studio, and, for him, the process of recording was unremarkable. Botnick agreed with him, stating that the session was short and he would be surprised if it lasted more than three hours: "maybe another three hours to do vocals, and it was basically done". Kaylan wrote that he recorded his lead vocals in one take. The basic track was cut in 15 takes according to Fred Bronson's book The Billboard Book of Number One Hits, but Barbata presumed that they had achieved a satisfying sound in only two takes.

Chip [Douglas] was, besides being a really fine bass player and excellent singer, also a great arranger, who did most of the arrangements on 'Happy Together.' He is very instrumental in what would be thought of as the production.

— Mark Volman, 2002

Although some members of the band contributed to the record's arrangements, probably the most cited is Chip Douglas. With only nine months in the group, Douglas proved to be important for the record, arranging the horns and the backing vocals. Both Kaylan and Volman praised his arrangement, the former stating that "Chip knew what he wanted to hear and he actually heard in his head the blend of horns and voices. He wanted to have the flutes echo the high voices and the horns be the middle voices". John Barbata credited himself with creating "those drum parts that helped make it [the record] magical".

After the orchestra was overdubbed, Kaylan said he remembered that he took the mono acetate home and listened to it numerous times: "I just couldn't believe how well the orchestra sat with the track, and how well the vocals blended, and just the overall mysterious sound we got. We knew it was gonna be a No.1 record". He noted that the song's production had sparse instrumentation in some portions while other segments were described as being "so 'Wall of Sound'", referring to the production methods of record producer Phil Spector, consisting of heavily layered instrumentation optimized for mono, indicating his influence on Wissert.

== Composition ==
The sheet music for "Happy Together" is notated in the common key of E minor, but the Turtles' recording is one whole step higher, in F♯ minor during the verses and F♯ major (F♯ Mixolydian) during the chorus. The song is in common time with a tempo of 120 beats per minute. It starts with an electric guitar, followed by drums and electric bass, then Kaylan starts to sing the first two verses, reinforced by another guitar and reverberated vocal harmonies in the second verse, before the chorus begins (consisting of double-tracked lead vocals now backed by four part "ah" singing and trumpets).

The switch of mode from minor key verse to major key chorus is called by Langerholc "one of the most effective minor to major switcharoos of all time". The pivot chord for the change of mode is C♯ (V), the dominant of both F♯ minor and major. This structure accompanies Kaylan in the third verse, the second chorus, the first repeat of the third verse (harmonizing with Volman), the "baa, baa" chorus and the outro: the second repeat of the third with the coda, that consists of another "baa, baa" section with the joining of the orchestra and the band, before the reverb fades the song. The outro (F♯ minor verse with the F♯ major coda) is a Picardy third. (Note: A Mellotron and an organ are used in the third verse and its second repeat, as well as in the chorus, while oboes (or organs mimicking them) are heard in the first repeat.)

Many listeners (such as Langerholc) thought that the lyrics of "Happy Together" were about a couple in love with each other due to its cheery chorus and the title, but, according to historian James E. Perone, a closer reading in the lyrics ("imagine me and you", "if I should call you") reveals that the love expressed by the narrator is not reciprocated by the other person, with Perone stating that the relationship "is only in dreams, wishes, desires and the mind of the singer". O'Rourke felt that the song "stretches the contrast between the loneliness of being apart and the thrill of being together to bipolar extremes". Joe Viglione compared "Happy Together"'s lyrics to Tommy James's hit "Mirage", but while "Mirage" was about an ex-girlfriend, "the Turtles never even get to first base in their laments". O'Rourke observed that is the listener's option to determine if in the final line "We're happy together", the narrator conquered his beloved, "or if he's just retreated into his fantasy world for good".

== Release and commercial performance ==
The Turtles performing "Happy Together" on The Ed Sullivan Show, May 14, 1967. The band performed on several TV shows due to the success of the song.

"Happy Together" was released as a single in January 1967, backed with the Warren Zevon-penned "Like the Seasons". To promote the single, the band members performed in a couple of shows, including The Smothers Brothers Comedy Hour in February. The Turtles would be called to perform on The Ed Sullivan Show on May 14, 1967, and again, as a quintet, on November 12 (Tucker had left for personal reasons). During this time, Douglas had left the Turtles to produce the Monkees. His replacement was Jim Pons, formerly from the Leaves. With Pons, they participated in a film shot in March that consisted of "the group running, jumping, rolling and mugging in a park in Los Angeles". Guitarist Tucker said in an interview that the park location was possibly Griffith Park.

According to Volman, the song slowly climbed through the charts, saying that "it took maybe three or four weeks before it even got into the Top 20". He credits the radio airplay for helping the song to top the charts, on March 25, overtaking the Beatles' "Penny Lane". It stayed at number one for three weeks before being knocked out of the number-one position by Frank and Nancy Sinatra's duet "Somethin' Stupid". In total, the record stayed on the Billboard Hot 100 charts for 15 weeks. "Happy Together" was the breakthrough hit for the Turtles in Britain, where it peaked at number 12. The single, mainly distributed by London Recordings on other countries, became a Top 10 hit in Australia, Canada, Malaysia, Mexico, New Zealand, Singapore, and Spain.

The associated album Happy Together was released in April 1967. Gary Bonner and Alan Gordon also wrote the next three singles for the Turtles, including the top 10 "She'd Rather Be with Me". The "Happy Together" single sold three million copies, and was certified 3× platinum by the Recording Industry Association of America (RIAA) on February 7, 2024.

== Reception and accolades ==
The single received primarily positive reviews in the American press at the time. Billboard magazine described "Happy Together" as a "groovy folk-oriented item" that could repeat the chart success of the Turtles' earlier hit single "It Ain't Me, Babe (also predicting that the song would reach the Top 20) and praised Joe Wissert's production. It is similarly described in Cashbox magazine, where they write that it is a "happy go-lucky melody-rocker" regarding a boy who has fallen in love. They end the review by noting that it might become a hit for the group. In Record World, the song was ranked a "sleeper of the week", stating that the group are "happy together", which they had to be in order to get the song "into the grooves". In the UK, the single also received praise. In Disc & Music Echo, critic Penny Valentine writes that the group has a "divine sound going" on the song. She positively notes the guitars, which she considers "warm", and closes the review by stating that the lead singer "threads" the lyrics together. Peter Jones from Record Mirror believes that "Happy Together" starts off tamely which escalates into a "most commercial sort of sound". He also adds that the chorus appealed to him the most. All in all, he gave the single four stars.

Since then, the song has continued to receive positive reviews. the Denise Sullivan of AllMusic stated that the Turtles had combined "all their pop, folk, psychedelia, and Zombies-style harmony expertise" into "Happy Together", while considering it a "pop perfection" and "a most sublime slice of pop heaven". In his book, Sixties Rock, a Listener's Guide, Robert Santelli called the song "arguably one of the two or three greatest pop constructions with its intricate arrangement and great harmonies". Wadhams called it a "brilliant pop production, deftly crafted by Joe Wissert", while observing that "good pop can be produced by formula, but great pop—like The Turtles' best—combines real music art with a pure, ear-charming entertainment". A reviewer from The Daily Guru claimed that "the way in which The Turtles take a base of folk music, yet give it a more rock-style edge and mood is the most obvious difference, and the manner with which the chorus sections seem to soar away from the rest of the song is where "Happy Together" truly becomes an unforgettable moment in music history".

Some reviewers and authors labeled it "bubblegum pop", but Sullivan and The Daily Guru reviewer observed that, despite its bubblegum sensibilities, the song "rises above it" and its "[later] continued legendary status makes it far more than that".

Tom Breihan of Stereogum praised "Happy Together" for its instrumentation but felt that the Turtles were only capitalizing on Beatles and Beach Boys innovations to "put them in service of the sort of silly no-stakes love songs that those bands might've recorded a few years earlier in their career." He rated it an 8/10.

Due to its subsequent popularity, in 1999, BMI named "Happy Together", with approximately five million performances on American radio, the 44th most-performed song in the United States of the 20th century, placing it in the same league as "Yesterday" by the Beatles and "Mrs. Robinson" by Simon & Garfunkel. In 2007, it was inducted into the Grammy Hall of Fame.

== Cover versions ==
"Happy Together" has been covered by artists as diverse as Odyssey, Mel Tormé, Captain and Tennille, the Nylons, Jason Donovan, Petula Clark, Simple Plan, Donny Osmond and Gerard Way. At the same year of the original release, Argentinian singer Palito Ortega recorded a cover called "Qué Importa La Gente". Spanish flamenco duo Las Grecas made a cover called "Los dos tan felices" (We both so happy) in their album Tercer Album (1976) and there is also a Spanish cover, sung by Roberto Jordán, called "Juntos y Felices". Miley Cyrus covered the song on the Backyard Sessions YouTube series.

Norwegian comedy group Prima Vera recorded a version with altered lyrics titled "Så Lykkelig I Sverige" (So Happy in Sweden) from their album Brakara (1978).

Hugo Montenegro's cover version was released as a single in 1969 and reached number 29 on the Billboard Easy Listening chart.

At a live performance in New Orleans in 2018, American rock band Weezer performed a cover version of the song. The cover was described by Doug MacCash of The Times-Picayune as "fierce yet faithful", taking "that chunk of 50-year-old bubblegum and chew[ing] it into grungy rock n roll glory".

== Copyright lawsuits ==
Flo & Eddie, legal successors to the Turtles, filed a lawsuit (Flo & Eddie, Inc. v. Sirius XM Radio) in the New York Court of Appeals against Sirius XM Radio to establish common law copyright on their original recording of "Happy Together". As the song was recorded in 1967, five years before federal sound copyright was established, the group sought to establish that such recordings were covered under common law copyright, a nebulous form of copyright held at the state level, in the hopes of earning royalties from Sirius XM; as they did not write the song, they could receive only performance royalties. The Court of Appeals had previously ruled that such a common law copyright may exist for the sale of recordings in New York in the 2005 ruling Capitol Records, Inc. v. Naxos of America, Inc.. On December 20, 2016, the Court ruled that no such common law copyright exists in New York for public performances of a sound recording, and that Flo & Eddie could not claim royalties.

On March 20, 2016, Scottish rock band Biffy Clyro released their single "Wolves of Winter", which originally featured the lyric "we have the chance to be happy together" in the pre-chorus, sung in a similar manner to the Turtles' recording. However, the lyric was changed due to copyright infringement, becoming "we have the chance to survive the winter", as sung in the second pre-chorus.

== Usage in media ==
In 1999, the song was used in a commercial for the Nintendo 64 crossover fighting game Super Smash Bros. The commercial depicts mascot costumes of Mario, Donkey Kong, Yoshi, and Pikachu skipping through a field of flowers, until Mario trips Yoshi, at which point the four start fighting each other, all while the song plays in the background.

Jim Bessman reported for Billboard that the "key usage in the acclaimed movie" Adaptation is "as a means of juxtaposing a soundtrack song against the story's mood, à la 'As Time Goes By' in Casablanca". Bessman goes on to say that "the song's inclusion in Adaptation has also spurred the solo side of Kaylan's career."

When I saw the film, the audience started singing along with it ... It indicated to me that this thing had a life of its own—and that it was time for me to get off my butt and finish my solo album.

— Howard Kaylan, Billboard

In 2024–2025, the song was used in commercials for Chevrolet.

== Personnel ==
According to Tom Pinnock and Wayne Wadhams.

The Turtles

- Howard Kaylan – lead and backing vocals
- Mark Volman – backing vocals
- Al Nichol – lead guitar, keyboards, backing vocals
- Jim Tucker – rhythm guitar, backing vocals
- Chip Douglas – bass guitar, backing vocals, horn and woodwind arrangements
- John Barbata – drums

== Charts ==
=== Weekly charts ===
| Chart (1967) | Peak position |
|---|---|
| Australia (Go-Set) | 25 |
| Canada RPM Top Singles | 2 |
| Ireland (IRMA) | 19 |
| New Zealand (Listener) | 2 |
| Norway (VG-Lista) | 9 |
| Rhodesia (Lyons Maid) | 6 |
| South Africa (Springbok Radio) | 3 |
| Sweden (Kvällstoppen) | 20 |
| Sweden (Tio i Topp) | 6 |
| UK (Record Retailer) | 12 |
| US Billboard Hot 100 | 1 |
| US Cash Box Top 100 | 1 |
| West German Media Control Singles Chart | 11 |

=== Year-end charts ===
| Chart (1967) | Rank |
|---|---|
| Canada | 13 |
| US Billboard Hot 100 | 8 |
| US Cash Box Top 100 | 6 |

=== All-time charts ===
| Chart (1958–2018) | Position |
|---|---|
| US Billboard Hot 100 | 448 |

== Certifications ==
| Region | Certification | Certified units/sales |
|---|---|---|
| New Zealand (RMNZ) | Platinum | 30,000^{‡} |
| United Kingdom (BPI) | Platinum | 600,000^{‡} |
| United States (RIAA) | 3× Platinum | 3,000,000^{‡} |
^{‡} Sales+streaming figures based on certification alone.
