= These Are My Songs =

Studio album by Petula Clark
- Released: 1967
- Recorded: Los Angeles
- Genre: Pop
- Label: Pye Records; NPL 18197 Mono, NSPL 18197 Stereo; Warner Bros. Records; W 1698 Mono; WS 1698 Stereo
- Producer: Sonny Burke

Petula Clark chronology
| Colour My World (1967) | These Are My Songs (1967) | The Other Man's Grass Is Always Greener (1968) |

Singles from These Are My Songs
- 1. "Don't Sleep in the Subway" Released: April 1967

These Are My Songs is a 1967 album released by Petula Clark. In a break with longtime collaborator Tony Hatch, Clark joined forces with producer Sonny Burke and arranger/conductor Ernie Freeman for this release.

The album includes two songs that were released as singles. "This Is My Song", with words and music by Charlie Chaplin, had been composed as an instrumental theme for his film A Countess From Hong Kong. It peaked at #1 in the United Kingdom and #3 in the US. "Don't Sleep In The Subway", the only track written by Hatch and Jackie Trent, who had written much of Clark's previous material, charted at #5 in the US and #12 in the UK. Hatch arranged and produced the song.

"On The Path Of Glory" was a civil rights song co-written by Clark. It was the song she was singing with Harry Belafonte on her 1968 NBC special when she touched his arm. This incident set off controversy when the sponsor threatened to back out because a white woman touched a black man. Clark and Belafonte stood firm and the segment remained as filmed.

These Are My Songs reached #27 on the album charts in the US where it was Clark's first album release to feature "This Is My Song". In the UK that track had been featured on Clark's Colour My World album which had been released concurrently with the "This Is My Song" single in February 1967 and had reached #16. The These Are My Songs album reached #38 on the UK charts.

The tracks attributed to Al Grant actually were written by Petula, who used the pseudonym for many of her compositions during the 1960s.

For the first time, the same cover artwork as the original Warner Bros. release was used for versions of the album released worldwide by Pye Records and Disques Vogue.

== Track listing ==
Side One
| No. | Title | Writer(s) | Length |
|---|---|---|---|
| 1. | "This Is My Song" | Charlie Chaplin | 2:17 |
| 2. | "Groovin'" | Felix Cavaliere, Eddie Brigati | 2:59 |
| 3. | "Lover Man" | Jimmy Davis, Roger "Ram" Ramirez, James Sherman | 3:04 |
| 4. | "San Francisco (Be Sure To Wear Some Flowers In Your Hair)" | John Phillips | 3:12 |
| 5. | "Eternally" | Charlie Chaplin, Geoffrey Parsons, John Turner | 2:35 |
| 6. | "Resist" | Al Grant | 2:46 |

Side Two
| No. | Title | Writer(s) | Length |
|---|---|---|---|
| 1. | "Don't Sleep in the Subway" | Tony Hatch, Jackie Trent | 2:57 |
| 2. | "Imagine" (theme from The Bobo) | Francis Lai, Sammy Cahn | 2:58 |
| 3. | "Love Is Here" | Al Grant | 2:43 |
| 4. | "How Insensitive" | Antônio Carlos Jobim, Norman Gimbel, Vinícius de Moraes | 2:40 |
| 5. | "I Will Wait For You" | Michel Legrand, Jacques Demy | 2:28 |
| 6. | "On the Path of Glory" | Petula Clark, Guy Magenta, Kris Ife | 2:41 |
