= Don't Sleep in the Subway =

Single by Petula Clark

from the album These Are My Songs
- B-side: "Here Comes the Morning"
- Released: April 1967; 19 May 1967 (UK)
- Recorded: 1967
- Genre: Pop
- Length: 2:57
- Label: Pye (UK); Warner Bros. (US); Vogue (FRA)
- Songwriters: Tony Hatch, Jackie Trent
- Producer: Tony Hatch

Petula Clark singles chronology
"This Is My Song" (1967)	"Don't Sleep in the Subway" (1967)	"The Cat in the Window (The Bird in the Sky)" (1967)

"Don't Sleep in the Subway" is a song written by Tony Hatch and Jackie Trent and recorded by the British singer Petula Clark, who released it as a single in April 1967.

It received a 1968 Grammy Award nomination for best contemporary song, losing to "Up, Up and Away" by The 5th Dimension.

== Background ==
The song was constructed from three different sections of music previously composed by Hatch; it changes in musical style from pop to symphonic and then, for the chorus, to a Beach Boys-like melody.

In the lyrics the narrator advises her sweetheart against storming out after an argument due to his "foolish pride". If he does, he will "sleep in the subway" or "stand in the pouring rain" merely to prove his point. Although in Scotland there has long existed the Glasgow Subway metro line, in England the term "subway" refers to a pedestrian underpass rather than to an underground transit system. Hatch employed the term in the North American sense. According to the song's co-writer Jackie Trent, the title lyric was suggested by the 1961–62 Broadway musical Subways Are for Sleeping. "Don't Sleep in the Subway" peaked at No. 5 on the US charts in July 1967, becoming Clark's final US Top Ten single. It was also, for three consecutive weeks, the second of her two No. 1 hits on the Billboard Easy Listening chart, following the 1966 release of "I Couldn't Live Without Your Love".

In the UK, where Clark's previous single, "This Is My Song", had given Clark her best chart showing with two weeks at No. 1, "Don't Sleep in the Subway" reached a July 1967 chart peak of No. 12. This was a decline in Clark's UK chart profile that would continue until Clark made her last UK Top 40 appearance with "Song of My Life", which peaked at No. 32 in March 1971. (In the UK, Clark would subsequently peak in 1972 with "I Don't Know How to Love Him" at No. 47. In 1988, a remix of her 1964 recording "Downtown" peaked at No. 10.) "Don't Sleep in the Subway" reached No. 3 in Rhodesia, No. 5 in Canada, No. 7 in New Zealand, No. 10 in South Africa, and No. 16 in Germany. In Australia, it reached No. 1 on the charts dated 16 and 23 September 1967, marking Clark's final appearance at the top of an official Australian pop chart.

Along with "I Couldn't Live Without Your Love", Clark has cited "Don't Sleep in the Subway" among her personal favourite hits. The latter has also been recorded by Betty Chung, Rita Hovink, Marilyn Maye, Matt Monro, Patti Page, Frank Sinatra, Caterina Valente, and Mari Wilson. A Spanish rendering, "No duermas en el metro", was recorded by both Gelu (es) and Los Stop (es). Siw Malmkvist recorded the Swedish version, "Sov inte på tunnelbanan" (Swedish lyrics by Peter Himmelstrand), in 1970.

The song's title was used as part of a candidate's name in "Election Night Special", a sketch on Monty Python's Flying Circus: another of that series' episodes featured Cardinal Richelieu (Michael Palin) lip-synching to Clark's record on the show-within-a-show Historical Impersonations. It also makes a brief appearance in the Malcolm in the Middle episode "Emancipation", when Lois blasts the song on her car stereo to avoid confronting Francis about his legal emancipation.

The song was performed by Rachel Berry, (Lea Michele), and Artie Abrams (Kevin McHale) in the 2014 Glee episode "New New York".

== Charts ==
Chart (1967)	Peak position
Australian Singles Chart	1
Canada Top Singles (RPM)	5
Malaysian (Radio Malaysia)	1
New Zealand (Listener)	7
Singapore (Radio Singapore)	1
South African Singles Chart	10
UK Singles (Official Charts)	12
US Billboard Hot 100	5
US Adult Contemporary (Billboard)	1

== See also ==
- List of number-one adult contemporary singles of 1967 (U.S.)
