= This Is My Song (1967 song) =

Single by Petula Clark

from the album These Are My Songs
- B-side: "The Show Is Over" (UK); "High" (US)
- Released: February 1967
- Recorded: 5 January 1967
- Genre: Pop
- Length: 3:16; 2:16 (US 7")
- Label: Pye 7N 17258 (UK); Warner Bros. 7002 (US); Vogue V 4185 (FRA)
- Songwriter: Charlie Chaplin
- Producer: Sonny Burke

Petula Clark singles chronology
"Colour My World" (1966)	"This Is My Song" (1967)	"Don't Sleep in the Subway" (1967)

"This Is My Song" is a song written by Charlie Chaplin in 1966, and performed by Petula Clark.

== Origin and Petula Clark recording ==
"This is My Song" was intended for the film A Countess from Hong Kong, which Charlie Chaplin wrote, directed and produced. Chaplin saw this film, the only production in Chaplin's filmography to be in color, as a throwback to the shipboard romances that were popular in the 1930s, and wrote "This Is My Song" with the intent of evoking that era. To reinforce the evocation, Chaplin was determined to have Al Jolson sing the song—so determined that he only accepted the information that Jolson had died on 23 October 1950 when shown a photograph of Jolson's tombstone. Ultimately, the song would be featured in the film only as an instrumental.

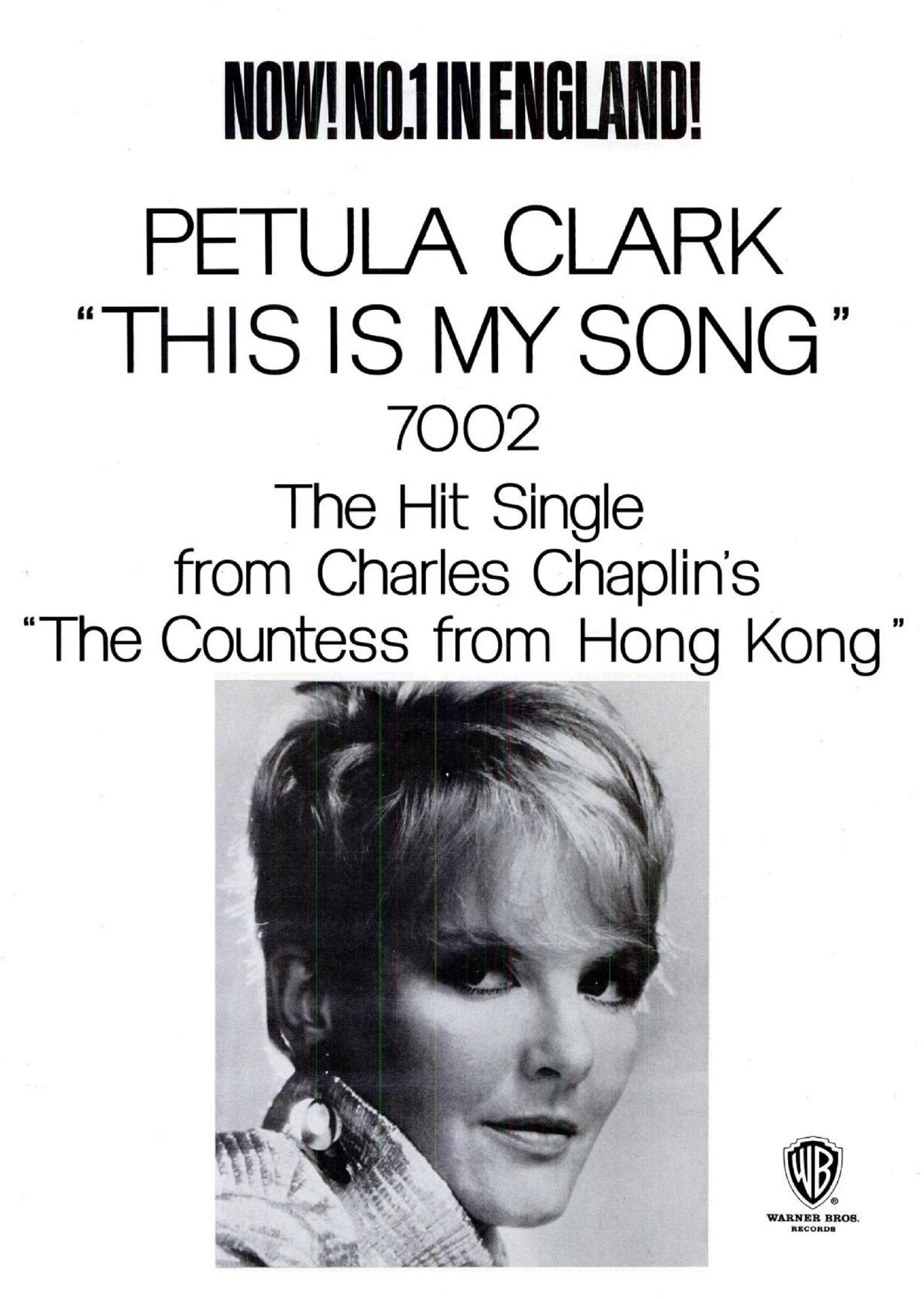
Billboard advertisement, February 25, 1967

After being disillusioned with regard to Jolson, Chaplin considered having "This Is My Song" recorded by Petula Clark, who had a home in Switzerland near his residence. Clark's husband and manager Claude Wolff—who at the time was with Clark in Reno, Nevada—received a copy of "This Is My Song" in September 1966, and liked the song which Clark felt had special potential for success in France. However, Clark's regular collaborator Tony Hatch was not impressed with the song, and refused Wolff's invitation to arrange it for Clark to record. French label Vogue Records then commissioned a then successful French arranger Jacques Denjean whose work was judged unsuitable by Wolff. Ultimately, Vogue's U.S. distributor Warner Bros. records sent Ernie Freeman who flew to Reno to prepare for the song's recording session which was to be produced by Sonny Burke at Western Studios in Los Angeles. Clark recorded the song not only in English, but in French as "C'est Ma Chanson" (lyrics by Pierre Delanoë, who also felt the song a poor choice for Clark), German as "Love, So Heisst Mein Song" (lyrics by Joachim Relin) and Italian as "Cara Felicità" (lyrics by Ciro Bertini). Clark did not even wish to record the song in English, because she disliked the deliberately old-fashioned lyrics, which Chaplin refused to modify; however, after the translated versions of the song had been recorded, some time remained on the session, and Burke coaxed Clark to use this to record Chaplin's lyrics. The recording session featured the backing of the Wrecking Crew.

== UK hit ==
Clark had assumed her recording of "This Is My Song" with the original quaint Chaplin lyrics would only be used as an album track; on learning of Pye Records' plan to release the track as a single she attempted to block its release. Instead, she found herself atop the UK Singles Chart for the first time in six years when "This Is My Song" reached no. 1 on the chart dated 16 February 1967, a position it retained the next week. Certified Silver for sales of 250,000, the total sales of "This Is My Song" in the UK would exceed 500,000.

The breakout of "This Is My Song" in the UK in February 1967 caused Pye Records to withdraw Clark's current album release Colour My World, which was rush re-released with "This Is My Song" added on to reach no. 16 on the charts. "This Is My Song" was also included on Clark's next album: These Are My Songs, which reached no. 38 UK later that year.

"This is My Song" (in English) is one of four Petula Clark hits for which she has expressed dislike, the others being: "Sailor", another UK no. 1 hit; "Monsieur", a German language no. 1 hit which won a gold disc for sales in Germany alone; and "My Love".

== International success ==
Petula Clark's "This Is My Song" was no. 1 for three weeks in Ireland and six weeks in Australia; it also topped the charts in Rhodesia and South Africa, and reached the top of the Dutch charts for both the Netherlands and Belgium. "This Is My Song" also earned hit status in Finland (#8), India (#5), Malaysia (#1), New Zealand (#15), Norway (#6), Singapore (#1), Spain (#8), Thailand (#9) and Venezuela (#5).

The North American single release omitted the opening lyrical section, following the instrumental introduction, owing to the length of the song. "This Is My Song" reached #3 in the U.S. and #4 in Canada. The These Are My Songs album peaked at #27 in the U.S., becoming Clark's second—and final—US Top 30 album (Downtown at #21 would remain Clark's top-ranking U.S. album).

"C'est Ma Chanson" reached #1 in France and #3 on the chart for Belgium's French-speaking sector, also reaching #10 on Belgium's Dutch chart where the English version had hit #1; total sales of the French-language version were reported as 350,000 by 8 April 1967. In Germany, the English version competed with the German-language version with the former more successful, reaching #16 while "Love, So Heisst Mein Song" peaked at #23. In Italy, the rendering "Cara Felicità" reached #23. In United Kingdom sales have reached 500,000 mark, while in Belgium 70,000. Sales in Belgium and France by 22 April 1967 have reached 500,000 total sales. "This Is My Song" sold 700,000 copies in France in five months while French version sold 350,000.

== Aftermath ==
Although Clark had become a fixture on the upper realms of the U.S. charts through her collaboration with writer/producer Tony Hatch on "Downtown", her UK singles chart success had been more hit-and-miss. The two singles before "This Is My Song", "Who Am I?" and "Colour My World", had failed to reach the UK Top 50. This made the strong UK showing of "This Is My Song"—Clark's first single release since "Downtown" to be neither written nor produced by Hatch—the more remarkable.

The follow-up single "Don't Sleep in the Subway" resumed the Clark/Hatch collaboration and was a UK hit (#12) but, like all Clark's releases after "This Is My Song", would fail to return her to the UK Top Ten.

Despite Clark's reservations about the English version of "This is My Song":

- the song's popularity mandates its inclusion in any concert Clark gives in the English-speaking world; Clark generally performs the song combining French lyrics with the English.
- the one published biography of Clark written to date (by Andrea Kon in 1983) is titled This Is My Song (W.H. Allen & Co. Ltd.).

== Other versions ==
The first recording of "This Is My Song" was made by Harry Secombe, with Angela Morley responsible for arranging and conducting. Secombe himself found the lyrics risible; several takes were necessitated due to his bursting into laughter when he tried to sing the line: "I care not what the world may say". Despite the eventual UK release of Clark's version as a single, "This Is My Song"'s appeal was strong enough to sustain two versions high on the chart. Secombe's version debuted at number 44 on 25 February 1967 (the second week Clark's version was number one) to rise as high as number two on the chart dated 1 April (which featured Clark's version at number eight). (Clark's previous UK #1 song, "Sailor", had also had a rival version, in that instance by Anne Shelton, which had reached the Top 10. Angela Morley, who'd regularly produced Clark for the Polygon label in the early 1950s, had also overseen the Shelton recording.) Secombe's version of "This Is My Song" was included on the album Secombe's Personal Choice, an April 1967 release whose chart peak of #6 in May 1967 bests that of both the Petula Clark albums which parented the song. Besides selling over 300,000 units in the UK, Secombe's version of "This Is My Song" also became a hit in Australia (#6), Ireland (#13) and South Africa (#15). The version ranked 28 on the Dutch Top 40's all-time "Love Top 40" chart.

Versions of "This Is My Song" have been recorded by Ronnie Aldrich, The Ray Charles Singers, Ray Conniff and the Singers (from the This Is My Song album/ 1967), Dada, James Darren, Percy Faith, Connie Francis (live version), Bobby Hendricks, Engelbert Humperdinck (whose "Release Me" succeeded Clark's version of "This Is My Song" at #1 UK and kept Secombe's version at #2), Morgana King, James Last, the Lennon Sisters, the Lettermen, the Patrick Linder and Thilo Wolf Big Band, Mantovani, Lena Martell, Al Martino, Paul Mauriat, Jane McDonald, Jim Nabors, Frank Sinatra, Jerry Vale, Bobby Vinton, Andy Williams, Taiwanese singer Tracy Huang (1980 with EMI) and Hong Kong artists, Nancy Sit (1967 with Crane Brand Records), Judy Jim 詹小屏 (1969 with EMI Columbia Graphophone Company) & The Chopsticks (Sandra & Amina) (1970 with Crown Records).

The Seekers also recorded a version of "This Is My Song" in 1967; however, the track was unreleased until 1995 when it was included on The Seekers - Complete box set. On the Seekers' Night of Nights...Live! release from 2002, "This Is My Song" follows "Ten Thousand Years Ago" - which only features the group's male members - to showcase Judith Durham as a solo vocalist.

Foreign language covers of "This Is My Song" contemporary with the Petula Clark hit version include: the Croatian rendering "Moja pjesma" recorded by Tereza Kesovija in 1968; the Czech rendering "Obrať Se S Důvěrou" recorded by Helena Blehárová (cs); the Dutch rendering "Sjungas till sömns" recorded by Lize Marke to chart in Belgium (Flemish Region) at No. 26 (as a double A-side hit with "Lara's lied"); another Dutch rendering: "Daar Straalt Eeen Licht", recorded by the Netherlands-based group the Shephards; the French version titled "C'est ma chanson" by Les Compagnons de la chanson, which reached No. 43 on the Belgian chart in 1967; the Polish rendering "Moja Piosenka" recorded by Halina Kunicka (pl); and the Serbian rendering "Ljubav Je To" recorded by Senka Veletanlić. 1967 also saw at least thirteen recordings of renderings of "This Is My Song" made by artists local to Scandinavia (Denmark/ Finland/ Norway/ Sweden) beginning with the Swedish "En serenad till dig" introduced by Ann-Louise Hanson and also recorded by Gunnar Wiklund: other Scandinavian renderings included the Danish "Min sang till dig" recorded by both Gitte and Katy Bødtger and the Finnish "Tämä on lauluni" recorded by Matti Heinivaho (fi). Contemporary covers of "C'est ma chanson" include those by Lucky Blondo (fr) and Mireille Mathieu while "Cara Felicità" was recorded by 15 Italian singers in 1967. In Spain "Amor es mi cancion" had been recorded by Juan Bau, Dova, Gelu (es) and Los Javaloyas. Angelika Milster (de) remade "Love, So Heisst Mein Song" for her 1998 album ""Die größten Hits der Filmgeschichte" as did Margot Eskens for a 2006 single release. Taiwanese singer Dai-Lin Chuang 黛玲 recorded a Chinese Mandarin version as 聽我歌唱 (Ting Wo Ge Chang) with EMI Pathe Records in 1967.
