= Sonny Burke =

American arranger, composer, band leader and producer (1914–1980)

- Born: Joseph Francis Burke; March 22, 1914; Scranton, Pennsylvania, U.S.
- Died: May 31, 1980 (aged 66); Santa Monica, California, U.S.
- Occupations: American composer, musical arranger, big band leader, and producer

Joseph Francis "Sonny" Burke (March 22, 1914 – May 31, 1980) was an American musical arranger, composer, Big Band leader, and producer. He was a prominent figure in the U.S. music industry, particularly in Los Angeles.

While he was one of the top composers and arrangers in the country for many years, his later career was more widely known for his production work. Burke's legacy is found in the numerous recordings he contributed to, as his work touched many people's lives, often without them knowing his name.

== Early life ==
Born to Francis P. Burke and Rhoda Nihany in Scranton, Pennsylvania, Burke was raised in Detroit, Michigan, where he attended St. Ambrose High School and earned All-State honors as a fullback. He briefly attended the University of Detroit, playing for coach Gus Dorais, before transferring to Duke University. At Duke, he formed and led the Duke Ambassadors, a jazz big band.

== Career ==
During the 1930s and 1940s, Burke was a big band arranger in New York City, working with Sam Donahue's band. He continued this work into the 1950s, arranging for the bands of Charlie Spivak and Jimmy Dorsey, among others. In addition to his work as an arranger for Spivak's band, Burke also composed their theme song, "Stardreams."

He also wrote the music for several popular songs, including "Black Coffee" and "Midnight Sun" with jazz vibraphonist Lionel Hampton; lyrics for "Midnight Sun" were later added by Johnny Mercer. In 1953, he co-wrote songs with John Elliot for the animated short film Toot, Whistle, Plunk and Boom, which won an Academy Award for Best Animated Short Film. In 1955, Burke collaborated with Peggy Lee to write the songs for Disney's Lady and the Tramp.

Burke became an active arranger, conductor, and A&R man at major Hollywood record labels, especially at Decca Records where he worked with Charles "Bud" Dant. He also wrote and arranged the theme for the early 1960s television show Hennesey, a jazzy update of "The Sailor's Hornpipe".

Later, as musical director of Warner Bros. Records and Reprise Records, Burke was responsible for many of Frank Sinatra's albums. He notably produced Sinatra's recording of "My Way" in 1969. He also produced Petula Clark's "This Is My Song", which was written by Charlie Chaplin for the movie A Countess From Hong Kong.

He also served as a bandleader for recordings by leading singers such as Dinah Shore, Bing Crosby, The Andrews Sisters, The Mills Brothers, Ella Fitzgerald, Mel Tormé, and Billy Eckstine.

On February 8, 1960, Burke was awarded a star on the Hollywood Walk of Fame for Recording at 6920 Hollywood Blvd.

== Death and interment ==
Burke died from cancer on May 31, 1980, in Santa Monica, California, at the age of 66. His interment was at Holy Cross Cemetery in Culver City.

He was married to Dorothy Gillis Burke and had four children: Gaylord, Peter, and twins Jerry and Tom Burke. His sister, Rhoda Burke Andrews, was the mother of Punch Andrews, the longtime manager for Bob Seger.

Burke's son, Peter Burke, also worked in the music industry. In January 1975, following a six-year tenure with ASCAP where he had served as acting West Coast director, he was appointed as the West Coast A&R manager for United Artists Records, specializing in new talent acquisition.

== Discography ==
=== As leader ===
- Sonny Burke plays Mambos (1951)
- Sonny Burke and his Orchestra I & II (1951)
- The Sonny Burke-Don Elliott Six (ca. 1960)
