= Live in Athens (Fates Warning video album) =

Video by Fates Warning
- Released: November 22, 2005
- Genre: Progressive metal
- Length: 165:00
- Label: InsideOut

Live in Athens is a 2005 DVD release by progressive metal band Fates Warning.

== Track listing ==
Live Show:

1. "One" – 4:39 (from Disconnected)
2. "A Pleasant Shade of Gray Pt. III" – 3:36 (from A Pleasant Shade of Gray)
3. "Life in Still Water" – 5:37 (from Parallels)
4. "Simple Human" – 3:55 (from FWX)
5. "Heal Me" – 4:22 (from FWX)
6. "Pieces of Me" – 4:16 (from Disconnected)
7. "Face the Fear" – 5:03 (from Inside Out)
8. "Quietus" – 3:58 (from No Exit)
9. "Another Perfect Day" – 4:12 (from FWX)
10. "A Pleasant Shade of Gray Pt. XI" – 3:41 (from A Pleasant Shade of Gray)
11. "The Eleventh Hour" – 8:06 (from Parallels)
12. "Point of View" – 5:11 (from Parallels)
13. "Monument" – 6:50 (from Inside Out)
14. "Still Remains" – 15:37 (from Disconnected)
15. "Nothing Left to Say" – 7:58 (from Perfect Symmetry)

=== Behind the Scenes ===
1. "Excerpts from Bulgarian TV"
2. "Athens Rehearsal"
3. "Athens Soundcheck"

=== Holland Headway Festival 2005 ===
1. "Another Perfect Day"
2. "The Eleventh Hour"

== Personnel ==
- Ray Alder - vocals
- Jim Matheos - guitars
- Frank Aresti - guitars
- Joey Vera - bass
- Nick D'Virgilio - drums
- Kevin Moore - keyboards on "Still Remains"
