= Darkness in a Different Light =

Studio album by Fates Warning
- Released: September 30, 2013
- Recorded: April–July 2013
- Studio: Carriage House Studios, Stamford, Connecticut; Jim Matheos' home studio, New Hampshire; The Bridge Recording, Glendale, California
- Genre: Progressive metal
- Length: 56:57
- Label: Inside Out
- Producer: Jim Matheos

Fates Warning chronology
FWX (2004)	Darkness in a Different Light (2013)	Theories of Flight (2016)

Darkness in a Different Light is the eleventh studio album by progressive metal band Fates Warning, released in 2013 through Inside Out Music. It is the band's first album since FWX (2004), marking the longest gap between two studio albums in their career, as well as being their only studio album with guitarist Frank Aresti since Inside Out (1994); although he appeared on the band's next album Theories of Flight (2016), as a guest, Darkness in a Different Light would be the last to feature Aresti as an official member. Drummer Bobby Jarzombek also makes his debut with Fates Warning on this album, and it is the band's first release through Inside Out Music.

== Background ==
Plans for an eleventh Fates Warning studio album were mentioned in September 2009 when vocalist Ray Alder said that the band was working on new material. In June 2011, guitarist and bandleader Jim Matheos hinted that Fates Warning would not be playing any more shows that year as the band was continuing to work on their new album.

In March 2012, Alder reaffirmed that the band was working "as hard as we can" to complete the album for a late 2012 or early 2013 release. On December 28, 2012, Matheos confirmed that the songwriting was complete. Three months later, it was announced that Fates Warning would enter the studio in April to record the album.

On August 1, 2013, the album title and release dates were announced. Alder described Darkness in a Different Light as "the result of almost two years of very hard work from everyone in the band" and celebrated the lineup as "the best that Fates Warning has ever had". He expressed his eagerness to tour extensively in support of the album. During October 2013, the band performed in nine European countries.

Alder suggested that awareness of the band's previous releases informed the new album: "The idea with Darkness in a Different Light was to do something similar to Parallels, not necessarily musically, but in theory. Catchy songs, big choruses—that was the idea. Sure, we sometimes think that we won't ever make an album as big as Parallels, but I think our new album is different than anything else out there right now. We look to the future".

With respect to the album title, Alder indicated that it was inspired, although accidentally, by Matheos' lyrics for the song "And Yet It Moves". Alder explained that

the lyrics [to that song] seemed to make everything a common bond—going back between light and dark. I don't know why or how that happened. It was some subconscious thing that went on. So the title just seemed to make sense. Some of the songs have to do with hope and working your way through certain things. I mean, darkness to me seems more of a state of mind - it's not a physical darkness. But Darkness In A Different Light seemed to make sense. Again, it tied in with the lyrics. It didn't mean to, but it did".

The track "O Chloroform" features lyrics by keyboardist Kevin Moore, which were originally left unused from the writing sessions for the 2011 Arch/Matheos album Sympathetic Resonance. Alder remarked of the song's lyrics and curious title: "It's such a cool song, ... I know what chloroform is, but I don't know what he's talking about [laughs]."

== Reception ==
Professional ratings
Review scores
Source	Rating
About.com	3.5/5 stars
AllMusic	3/5 stars
Blabbermouth	8.5/10
Jukebox:Metal	3/5 stars
Loudwire	4/5 stars
Sputnikmusic	4/5 stars

Reviews for Darkness in a Different Light have been mostly positive. Observing that instrumental technicality has become the norm in metal, AllMusic's Gregory Heaney lauded Fates Warning for bucking the trend and writing songs which "bring us back to a time when songs felt more like sprawling compositions than theoretical math problems". Describing it as "another notch in a long list of accomplishments for Fates Warning", Dan Drago praised the album in About.com for "flawlessly glid[ing] back and forth between complex progressive time signatures and straightforward crushing riffs". Blabbermouth's Ray Van Horn Jr. suggested a kinship between Darkness in a Different Light and Fates Warning's 1990s output, but also noted an "amplified toughness" that pointed to earlier works such as No Exit (1988). Joe Devita suggested in Loudwire that Darkness in a Different Light marked Fates Warning's "leap into the modern age" with the band "reinventing themselves while retaining pieces of their hallmark sound".

Around 2,700 copies were sold in its first week of release. This resulted in Darkness in a Different Light entering at 162 on the Billboard 200; the band's first album since Perfect Symmetry (1989) to appear on the chart.

== Track listing ==
No.	Title	Writer(s)	Length
1.	"One Thousand Fires"	Jim Matheos, Ray Alder, Frank Aresti	7:21
2.	"Firefly"	Matheos, Alder	4:59
3.	"Desire"	Matheos, Alder	4:00
4.	"Falling"	Alder, Matheos	1:34
5.	"I Am"	Matheos, Alder, Bobby Jarzombek	5:08
6.	"Lighthouse"	Matheos, Alder	5:25
7.	"Into the Black"	Matheos, Alder	5:09
8.	"Kneel and Obey"	Matheos	5:05
9.	"O Chloroform" (lyrics by Kevin Moore)	Matheos, Alder	4:13
10.	"And Yet It Moves"	Matheos	14:03
Total length:			56:57

Limited edition bonus disc
No.	Title	Writer(s)	Length
1.	"Firefly" (extended version)	Matheos, Alder	7:20
2.	"Falling Further"	Matheos, Alder	4:43
3.	"One" (live at Progpower USA; Atlanta, Georgia; September 12, 2009)	Matheos, Alder	4:41
4.	"Life in Still Water" (live at ProgPower USA; Atlanta, Georgia; September 12, 2009)	Matheos	5:21
Total length:			22:05

== Personnel ==
Fates Warning

- Ray Alder – lead vocals, production
- Jim Matheos – guitar, engineering (vocals, guitar)
- Frank Aresti – guitar, background vocals
- Bobby Jarzombek – drums
- Joey Vera – bass, engineering (bass)

Additional credits

- Phil Magnotti – engineering (drums), mixing
- Kent Smith – engineering, mixing (live tracks)
- Maor Appelbaum – mastering
- Conte di San Pietro – artwork, design

== Release history ==
Region	Date	Label
Europe	September 30, 2013	Inside Out
North America	October 1, 2013	Inside Out

== Chart performance ==
Year	Chart	Position
2013	Billboard Heatseekers Albums	5
2013	Billboard Hard Rock Albums	10
2013	Billboard Independent Albums	32
2013	German albums chart	41
2013	Billboard Top Rock Albums	50
2013	Swiss albums chart	56
2013	Dutch albums chart	90
2013	Belgian albums chart	129
2013	Billboard 200	162
