= Still Life (Fates Warning album) =

Live album by Fates Warning
- Released: 6 October 1998
- Genre: Progressive metal
- Length: 51:55 (Disc I); 55:33 (Disc II); 107:38 (Total)
- Label: Massacre Records

Fates Warning chronology
A Pleasant Shade of Gray (1997)	Still Life (1998)	Disconnected (2000)

Professional ratings
Review scores
Source	Rating
Allmusic	3/5 stars
Collector's Guide to Heavy Metal	6/10

Still Life is a live album by progressive metal band Fates Warning, released in 1998. The Japanese release of this album includes a studio cover version of the Scorpions song "In Trance" (Track 8 on Disc II).

== Track listing ==
=== Disc one ===
No.	Title	Length
1.	"A Pleasant Shade of Gray": I. "Part I"; II. "Part II"; III. "Part III"; IV. "Part IV"; V. "Part V"; VI. "Part VI"; VII. "Part VII"; VIII. "Part VIII"; IX. "Part IX"; X. "Part X"; XI. "Part XI"; XII. "Part XII"	51:55: 2:09; 3:36; 3:56; 4:34; 5:27; 7:04; 5:38; 2:44; 4:42; 1:11; 3:23; 7:31

=== Disc two ===
No.	Title	Length
1.	"The Ivory Gate of Dreams"	20:54
2.	"The Eleventh Hour"	8:15
3.	"Point of View"	4:33
4.	"Monument"	6:46
5.	"At Fate's Hands"	6:48
6.	"Prelude to Ruin"	3:39
7.	"We Only Say Goodbye"	4:42
Total length:		53:33

=== Japanese edition ===
No.	Title	Length
8.	"In Trance" (Scorpions cover; Japanese bonus track)

== Band members ==
- Ray Alder – Vocals
- Jim Matheos – Guitars
- Mark Zonder – Drums

== Guest musicians ==
- Bernie Versailles – Guitars
- Joey Vera – Bass
- Jason Keazer – Keyboards
