= League of Lights =

British art pop-rock duo

- Origin: United Kingdom
- Genres: Art rock, Art pop, Symphonic rock, Electronic rock, Synth pop
- Years active: 2010–present
- Members: Farrah West; Richard West
- Website: www.leagueoflights.com

League of Lights is a British art pop-rock duo, formed in the UK during 2010 by vocalist Farrah West and keyboard player/producer Richard West from British rock band Threshold.

League of Lights released their self-titled debut album in 2011 with contributions from guitarist Ruud Jolie of Dutch symphonic rock act Within Temptation, drummer Mark Zonder of US progressive metallers Fates Warning, and bassist Jerry Meehan. The album was followed by the single "Forever" in 2012, featuring guest vocals by former Threshold vocalist Glynn Morgan, with drums once again by Mark Zonder.

League of Lights’ acclaimed second album "In The In Between" was released in late 2019 and contains 14 original songs with a sound that makes room for electronic rock, organic pop, piano, cinematic soundscapes and everything in between, including the singles "Kings & Queens" and "On A Night Like This". The video for "Kings & Queens" was filmed at Palac Marianny in Kamieniec Zabkowicki, Poland. On 27 March 2020, the duo released the EP "Extended Light" featuring extended versions of the songs "On a Night Like This", "Spectrometer" and "Butterfly".

The band have performed at various live and online events during Summer 2020 including Artrock Festival in Germany (with Within Temptation's Ruud Jolie playing guitar).

The duo released their third album "Dreamers Don’t Come Down" on 12 March 2021, featuring 11 new songs written and recorded during lockdown. The album was preceded by the single "Twenty Twenty One" on 4 December 2020, accompanied by a video which was premiered on the Prog website. This was followed by a second single “Modern Living” on 29 January 2021, an indie club floor-filler accompanied by an anime video. According to vocalist Farrah West, "the album is about the past, the present and the future - about taking the best from all that you have been through, the pressures of modern life and keeping your dreams alive in dark times.”

== Line-up ==
Current members

- Farrah West - vocals
- Richard West - keyboards

Past guest performers

- Ruud Jolie - guitars
- Jerry Meehan - bass
- Mark Zonder - drums
- Glynn Morgan - vocals

== Discography ==
Albums and EPs

- 2011: League of Lights
- 2019: In The In Between
- 2020: Extended Light (EP)
- 2021: Dreamers Don’t Come Down

Singles

Single	Year	Album
Forever	2012	Non-album single
Kings and Queens	2019	In The In Between
On a Night Like This (Radio Version)	2020	In The In Between
Twenty Twenty One	2020	Dreamers Don't Come Down
Modern Living	2021	Dreamers Don't Come Down
The Collector (Radio Version)	2021	Dreamers Don't Come Down
Persephone (Radio Version)	2021	Dreamers Don't Come Down
Forever (2022 Remastered Version)	2022	Non-album single
