= Disconnected (Fates Warning album) =

Studio album by Fates Warning
- Released: July 25, 2000
- Recorded: February–April, 2000
- Genre: Progressive metal
- Length: 51:28
- Label: Metal Blade
- Producer: Fates Warning, Terry Brown

Fates Warning chronology
Still Life (1998)	Disconnected (2000)	FWX (2004)

Alternative cover
- European edition

Professional ratings
Review scores
Source	Rating
AllMusic	4/5 stars

Disconnected is the ninth studio album by progressive metal band Fates Warning, released on July 25, 2000, through Metal Blade Records. Kevin Moore previously played on the Fates Warning album A Pleasant Shade of Gray and later appeared in OSI with Matheos.

The album was re-released in Germany in 2006 as part of a two-CD set with the album Inside Out featuring bonus tracks

== Track listing ==
All music is composed by Jim Matheos.

No.	Title	Lyrics	Length
1.	"Disconnected Part 1"	(Instrumental)	1:13
2.	"One"	Ray Alder	4:27
3.	"So"	Matheos	8:08
4.	"Pieces of Me"	Matheos, Alder	4:24
5.	"Something from Nothing"	Alder	10:59
6.	"Still Remains"	Matheos	16:08
7.	"Disconnected Part 2"	(Instrumental with spoken word)	6:11
Total length:			51:28

== Personnel ==
- Ray Alder – vocals
- Jim Matheos – guitars, additional keyboards, sequencing, effects
- Mark Zonder – drums
- Joey Vera – bass
- Kevin Moore – keyboards
- Steve Tushar – additional keyboards, sequencing, effects
- Laurie Matheos – voices
- Amy Motta – voices
- Bernie Altman – voices

Credits

- Fates Warning – producer
- Terry Brown – producer
- Phil Magnotti – drum and keyboard recording at Frankie's Hideaway, North Hollywood, California, mixing at Carriage House, digital editing, masting at Barking Doctor Studios
- Terry Brown – vocals, guitar and additional keyboard recording at Carriage House, Stamford, Connecticut
- Jim Matheos – additional vocals recording
- Joey Vera – additional vocals recording
- Laurie Matheos – superfluous voices, whispers and verbal meandering
- Amy Motta – superfluous voices, whispers and verbal meandering
- Bernie Altman – superfluous voices, whispers and verbal meandering
- George Hideous – superfluous voices, whispers and verbal meandering
- Fidel Horrendous – superfluous voices, whispers and verbal meandering
- Arthur Letsgoberg – superfluous voices, whispers and verbal meandering
- John Shyloski – assistant engineer
- Tom Bender – mastering at Barking Doctor Studios
- Alex Solca – photography
