= Long Day Good Night =

Studio album by Fates Warning
- Released: November 6, 2020
- Recorded: 2020
- Genre: Progressive metal
- Length: 72:35
- Label: Metal Blade

Fates Warning chronology
Theories of Flight (2016)	Long Day Good Night (2020)

Singles from Long Day Good Night
- 1. "Scars" Released: August 25, 2020

Long Day Good Night is the thirteenth and final studio album by American progressive metal band Fates Warning, released on November 6, 2020. It is Fates Warning's first release on Metal Blade Records since 2004's FWX and also the first to feature guitarist Mike Abdow as a full time member, which he became in 2017 having previously been a touring only member (since 2013) and appearing as a guest on their previous album Theories of Flight in 2016.

== Background ==
On February 15, 2019, it was announced that Fates Warning had re-signed to Metal Blade Records, and were planning to work on their thirteenth studio album for a 2020 release. In a December 2019 interview, bassist Joey Vera stated, "Fates Warning is not quite done writing, but pretty close. I think that the Fates record is also gonna be recording probably around January, February. I'm still very involved in both of those bands, obviously. So, for sure, a new Armored Saint record and a new Fates Warning record is on the horizon in the next 18 months, for sure." On May 13, 2020, Alder announced on his Instagram profile that his vocals for the album were finished.

On August 25, 2020, details of Fates Warning's thirteenth studio album were released, including the title, release date and track listing, and its lead single "Scars" was released on the same day.

In a May 2023 interview, Ray Alder revealed that Jim Matheos has no plans of writing any more new music for the band.

== Track listing ==
All lyrics are written by Ray Alder, except where noted; all music is composed by Jim Matheos, except where noted.

Long Day Good Night track listing
No.	Title	Lyrics	Music	Length
1.	"The Destination Onward"			8:12
2.	"Shuttered World"			5:13
3.	"Alone We Walk"			4:43
4.	"Now Comes the Rain"			4:14
5.	"The Way Home"			7:43
6.	"Under the Sun"			5:49
7.	"Scars"			5:04
8.	"Begin Again"		Jim Matheos, Bobby Jarzombek	4:05
9.	"When Snow Falls"			4:15
10.	"Liar"			4:23
11.	"Glass Houses"		Jim Matheos, Bobby Jarzombek	3:35
12.	"The Longest Shadow of the Day"	Jim Matheos		11:29
13.	"The Last Song"	Jim Matheos, Ray Alder		3:50
Total length:				72:35

== Personnel ==
- Ray Alder – lead vocals
- Jim Matheos – guitars
- Joey Vera – bass, backing vocals
- Bobby Jarzombek – drums
- Mike Abdow – guitar solos on "Shuttered World", "The Way Home" & "The Longest Shadow of the Day".

== Guest musicians ==
- Gavin Harrison – drums on When Snow Falls
- Mika Posen – violin on Under the Sun
- Raphael Weinroth-Browne – cello on Under the Sun
- George Hideous – bass on When Snow Falls & The Last Song

== Charts ==
Chart performance for Long Day Good Night
Chart (2020)	Peak position
Austrian Albums (Ö3 Austria)	50
Belgian Albums (Ultratop Flanders)	134
German Albums (Offizielle Top 100)	11
Hungarian Albums (MAHASZ)	24
Swiss Albums (Schweizer Hitparade)	20
