= Live in Athens =

Live in Athens may refer to:

- Live in Athens (Fates Warning video album), 2005
- "Live in Athens" (Motörhead single), 1988
- Live In Athens 1987, 2013 video album by Peter Gabriel
- Live In Athens, 2011 DVD by Archive
- With the Wild Crowd! Live in Athens, GA, 2012 live album and DVD by The B-52s
