= Chasing Time (Fates Warning album) =

Compilation album by Fates Warning
- Released: July 25, 1995
- Genre: Progressive metal
- Length: 77:43

Fates Warning chronology
Inside Out (1994)	Chasing Time (1995)	A Pleasant Shade of Gray (1997)

Professional ratings
Review scores
Source	Rating
Allmusic	4/5 stars
Collector's Guide to Heavy Metal	6/10

Chasing Time is a compilation album, recorded by the Progressive metal group Fates Warning. The album was released on July 25, 1995. It includes 14 songs from all the band's periods, including 1 unreleased remix and 2 unreleased songs. It is the only compilation album the band has released.

== Track listing ==
1. "Monument" - 6:15
2. "The Apparition" - 5:47
3. "Through Different Eyes" - 4:20
4. "Point of View" - 4:58
5. "Prelude to Ruin" - 7:20
6. "Quietus" - 4:06
7. "Eye to Eye" - 4:05
8. "Guardian" - 7:30
9. "At Fates Hands" [Previously unreleased] - 4:46
10. "Silent Cries" - 3:16
11. "We Only Say Goodbye" [Previously unreleased remix] - 4:50
12. "Damnation" - 6:22
13. "Circles" [Previously unreleased] - 5:16
14. "The Eleventh Hour" - 8:52
- Track 1 is from Inside Out (1994)
- Track 2 is from The Spectre Within (1985)
- Track 3 is from Perfect Symmetry (1989)
- Tracks 4, 7, 11, and 14 are from Parallels (1991)
- Tracks 5 and 8 are from Awaken the Guardian (1986)
- Tracks 6 and 10 are from No Exit (1988)
- Track 9, an instrumental version of "At Fates Hands" from Perfect Symmetry, is from Guitar's Practicing Musicians Vol. 2. (1991)
- Track 12 is from Night on Bröcken (1984)
- Track 13, recorded during the Inside Out sessions, had not appeared elsewhere
