= Deliver Us =

Deliver Us may refer to:

- Deliver Us (Darkest Hour album), a 2007 album by death metal band Darkest Hour
- Deliver Us (Warlord album), a 1983 album by heavy metal band Warlord
- "Deliver Us" (The Prince of Egypt), a song from the 1998 film The Prince of Egypt
- "Deliver Us" (In Flames song), a song from the 2011 album Sounds of a Playground Fading by heavy metal band In Flames
- Deliver Us (film), a 2023 horror film
