= A Pleasant Shade of Gray =

Studio album by Fates Warning
- Released: 22 April 1997
- Recorded: December 1996
- Studio: The Carriage House (Stamford, Connecticut)
- Genre: Progressive metal
- Length: 53:46
- Label: Metal Blade Records
- Producer: Terry Brown

Fates Warning chronology
Chasing Time (1995)	A Pleasant Shade of Gray (1997)	Still Life (1998)

A Pleasant Shade of Gray is the eighth studio album by progressive metal band Fates Warning, released on April 22, 1997, through Metal Blade Records. It is a concept album, and contains one song divided into twelve parts and is noted for its darker mood and more progressive style.

== Overview ==
A Pleasant Shade Of Gray is a single song that is divided into twelve tracks. The album is notable for its darker mood and mixture of progressive rock and metal with hints of industrial, classical, and psychedelia. Jim Matheos wrote the album following Fates Warning's 1994 tour in support of Inside Out, with Matheos mailing tapes to Ray Alder and Mark Zonder. The record was recorded after two weeks of live rehearsals. It took approximately one month in Carriage House studio with Terry Brown producing to complete the recording. Then-former Armored Saint bassist Joey Vera and former Dream Theater keyboard player Kevin Moore were recruited to complete the recording lineup of Matheos, Alder, and Zonder.

Matheos said that the genesis of A Pleasant Shade of Gray's stark departure was the similarity of the previous two albums. "I think all of our records have been drastically different with the exception of Inside Out and Parallels [...] Looking back, that might not have been such a good move. We repeated ourselves and when we stepped away from it at the end of touring with it we weren't pleased with that; so this time we've done something radically different."

In 2007 the album was re-released by Metal Blade Europe with a bonus DVD of the Pleasant Shade of Gray Live video, previously only on VHS.

== Reception ==
Professional ratings
Review scores
Source	Rating
AllMusic	2.5/5 stars
Collector's Guide to Heavy Metal	7/10
Rock Hard	9/10
Sputnikmusic	4.5/5 stars

Sputnikmusic gave the album 4.5 stars and noted that the album has held up well with the passage of time: "It wasn't until later that people began to regard A Pleasant Shade of Gray in a more positive light, and its popularity subsequently grew as the album is now considered inimitable in the progressive genre." In 2005, the album was ranked number 416 in Rock Hard magazine's book of The 500 Greatest Rock & Metal Albums of All Time.

However, AllMusic panned the album, criticizing "the guitar riffs and melodic hooks [as] simply not that memorable, requiring way too many listens before leaving any lasting impressions and overshadowing the band's remarkable musicianship [...] All told, A Pleasant Shade of Gray is a challenging listen and not for the faint of heart."

In 2025, it was ranked by Loudwire as the 7th best progressive metal album of the 1990s.

== Track listing ==
All tracks are written by Jim Matheos.

No.	Title	Length
1.	"A Pleasant Shade of Gray": I. "Part I"; II. "Part II"; III. "Part III"; IV. "Part IV"; V. "Part V"; VI. "Part VI"; VII. "Part VII"; VIII. "Part VIII"; IX. "Part IX"; X. "Part X"; XI. "Part XI"; XII. "Part XII"	53:46: 1:53; 3:25; 3:53; 4:26; 5:24; 7:28; 4:51; 3:31; 4:45; 1:19; 3:34; 9:08
Total length:		53:46

Part XII ends at 7:46; it is then followed by 31 seconds of silence and 31 seconds of an alarm-clock ringing to signify the end of a dream.

== Credits ==
=== Band ===
- Ray Alder – vocals
- Jim Matheos – guitar, guitar synth
- Mark Zonder – drums
- Joey Vera – bass
- Kevin Moore – keyboards
- Bill Metoyer, Lydia Montagnese, Mark Zonder, Terry Brown, Lindsay Matheos – additional voices

=== Production and art ===
- Terry Brown – production, recording and mixing
- Andy Katz and Joe Peccerillo – assistant engineering
- Eddy Schreyer – mastering
- Bill Metoyer – pre-production
- Ioannis and Steve Jacaruso at Vivid Images – art direction and design
- Ioannis and Heide Coyle – photography

The credits thank former bassist Joe DiBiase, who departed the band in 1995; A Pleasant Shade of Grey was the first Fates Warning album without DiBiase.
