= Arch/Matheos =

American progressive metal band

- Origin: Los Angeles, California, U.S.
- Genre: Progressive metal
- Years active: 2010−present
- Label: Metal Blade
- Members: Jim Matheos; John Arch; Frank Aresti; Joey Vera; Bobby Jarzombek
- Website: www.metalblade.com/us/artists/arch-matheos/

Arch/Matheos is an American progressive metal project.

== History ==
Arch/Matheos began as a reunion between founding Fates Warning members John Arch and Jim Matheos, who had not collaborated since Arch's 2003 EP A Twist Of Fate and had not fully collaborated for a whole album since 1986's Awaken the Guardian. In 2010, the duo began working on an album together and brought along three Fates Warning members to the fold. The five members would in turn release their debut album "Sympathetic Resonance" in 2011, under the name Arch/Matheos. The album, while only 6 tracks, clocked at 55 minutes. On August 17, 2018, they re-signed with Metal Blade records.

In August 2018, a follow-up album was announced for release in 2019. On March 29, 2019, Metal Blade announced the name of the album would be Winter Ethereal, and was released on May 10. To emphasize the project's distance from Fates Warning, Winter Ethereal featured numerous guest performers such as former Fates Warning members Joe Dibiase and Mark Zonder as well as musicians Steve Di Giorgio (Death, Testament, Charred Walls of the Damned), Cynic's Sean Malone, and drummer Thomas Lang.

== Discography ==
- Sympathetic Resonance (2011, Metal Blade)
- Winter Ethereal (2019)

== Performers ==
=== Sympathetic Resonance ===
- John Arch − vocals
- Jim Matheos − lead and rhythm guitars
- Frank Aresti − lead guitar
- Joey Vera − bass guitar
- Bobby Jarzombek − drums

=== Winter Ethereal ===
- John Arch − vocals
- Jim Matheos − lead and rhythm guitars
- Joey Vera − bass guitar on "Wanderlust", "Never in Your Hands"
- Bobby Jarzombek − drums on "Wrath of the Universe", "Straight and Narrow"
- Frank Aresti – guitar solos in "Never in Your Hands", "Kindred Spirits"
- Joe DiBiase − bass guitar on "Solitary Man"
- Mark Zonder − drums on "Wanderlust", "Tethered"
- Steve Di Giorgio − bass guitar on "Vermilion Moons", "Wrath of the Universe", "Straight and Narrow"
- Sean Malone − bass guitar on "Pitch Black Prism", "Kindred Spirits"
- George Hideous − bass guitar on "Tethered"
- Matt Lynch − drums on "Kindred Spirits"
- Thomas Lang – drums on "Vermilion Moons", "Solitary Man", "Pitch Black Prism"
- Baard Kolstad – drums on "Never in Your Hands"
