= Jim Matheos =

American songwriter

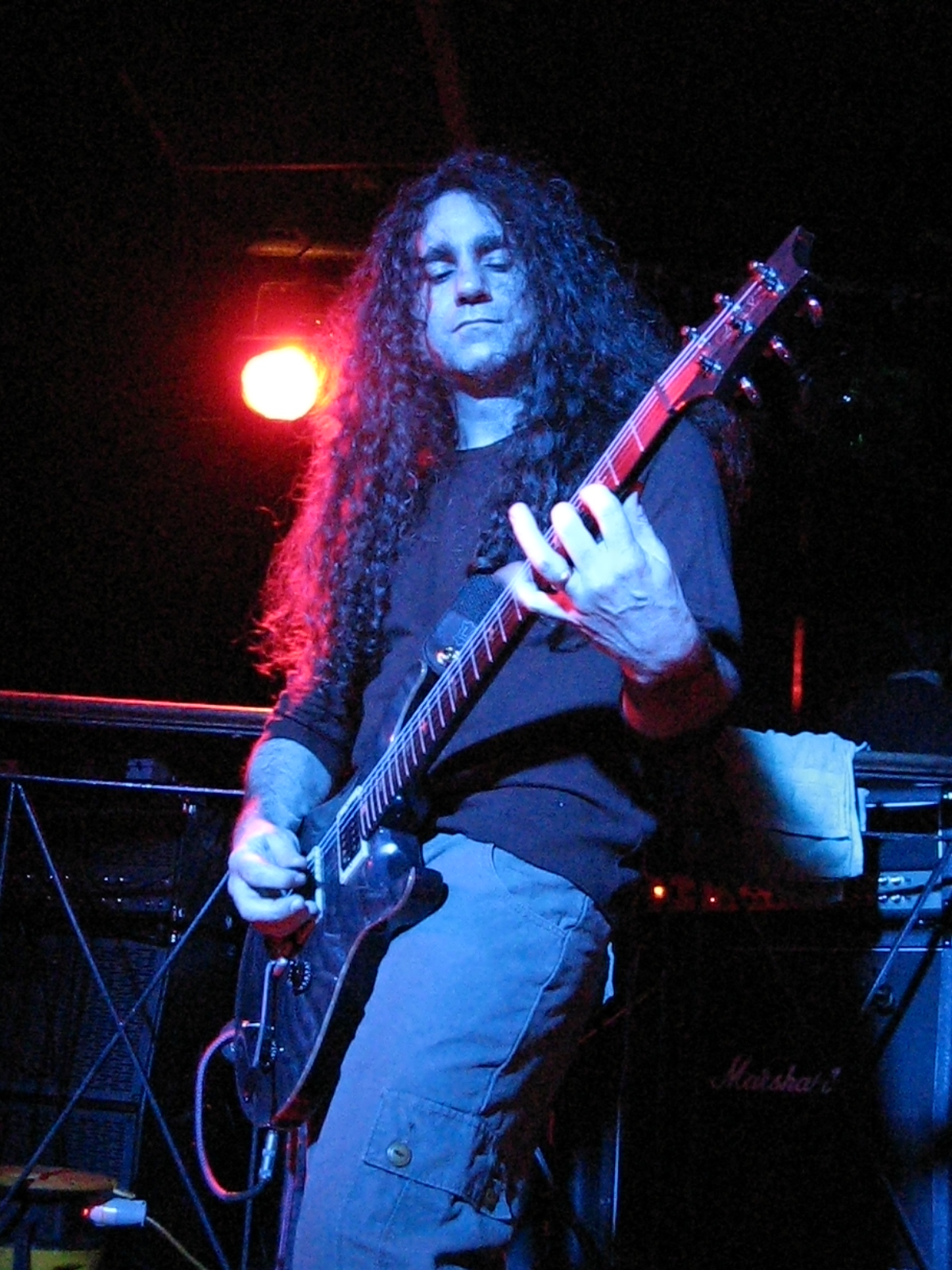

Background information
- Born: November 22, 1962 (age 63); Westfield, Massachusetts, U.S.
- Genre: Progressive metal
- Occupations: Musician, songwriter
- Instruments: Guitar, bass, keyboards, bouzouki, programming
- Years active: 1982–present

Jim Matheos (born November 22, 1962) is an American guitarist and the primary songwriter for the progressive metal band Fates Warning, in which he has been the only consistent member since the group's beginning. Matheos also plays in OSI alongside Kevin Moore (Chroma Key, ex-Dream Theater), as well as making other appearances with many different bands and artists.

He has also released two solo instrumental albums on Metal Blade Records.

In 2003, Matheos collaborated with original Fates Warning vocalist John Arch on 2003's A Twist of Fate, Arch's first professional recording since leaving Fates Warning in 1987. The two later collaborated as Arch/Matheos, releasing full-length albums Sympathetic Resonance in 2011 and Winter Ethereal in 2019.

Fates Warning has released thirteen studio albums since their formation in 1982. Their latest studio album, Long Day Good Night, was released in 2020.

On February 17, 2014, Matheos released an experimental guitar album called Halo Effect. It was released by the independent record label Burning Shed.

== Discography ==
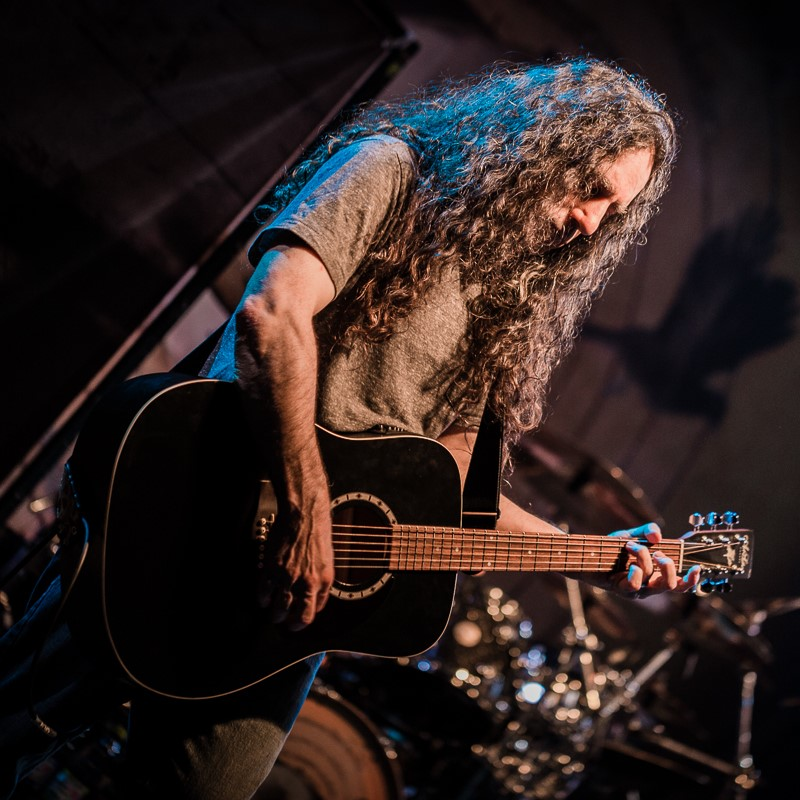
Jim Matheos with Fates Warning in Bratislava, Slovakia (2017)

=== With Fates Warning ===
- Night on Bröcken (1984)
- The Spectre Within (1985)
- Awaken the Guardian (1986)
- No Exit (1988)
- Perfect Symmetry (1989)
- Parallels (1991)
- Inside Out (1994)
- Chasing Time (1995)
- A Pleasant Shade of Gray (1997)
- Still Life (1998)
- Disconnected (2000)
- FWX (2004)
- Darkness in a Different Light (2013)
- Theories of Flight (2016)
- Live Over Europe (2018)
- Long Day Good Night (2020)

=== With OSI ===
- Office of Strategic Influence (2003)
- Free (2006)
- Blood (2009)
- Fire Make Thunder (2012)

=== With Gordian Knot ===
- Emergent (2003)

=== With John Arch ===
- A Twist of Fate (2003)

=== With John Arch (Arch/Matheos) ===
- Sympathetic Resonance (2011)
- Winter Ethereal (2019)

=== With Memories of Machines ===
- Warm Winter (2011)

=== Solo ===
- First Impressions (1993)
- Away With Words (1999)
- Halo Effect (2014)

=== With Tuesday the Sky ===
- Drift (2017)
- The Blurred Horizon (2021)
- Indoor Enthusiast (2025)

=== With Kings of Mercia ===
- Kings of Mercia (2022)
- Battle Scars (2024)

=== With North Sea Echoes ===
- Really Good Terrible Things (2024)
- How to Cast a Shadow (2026)

== Equipment ==
=== Guitar Rig & Signal Flow ===
A detailed gear diagram of Jim Matheos' 2012 Fates Warning guitar rig is well-documented.
