= Theories of Flight =

2016 Fates Warning album

Studio album by Fates Warning
- Released: July 1, 2016
- Recorded: 2015–2016
- Genre: Progressive metal
- Length: 52:17
- Label: Inside Out Music
- Producer: Jim Matheos

Fates Warning chronology
Darkness in a Different Light (2013)	Theories of Flight (2016)	Long Day Good Night (2020)

Professional ratings
Review scores
Source	Rating
Sputnikmusic	4.5/5 stars

Theories of Flight is the twelfth studio album by progressive metal band Fates Warning, released on July 1, 2016 through Inside Out Music; their last release on the label with their re-signing with their longtime label Metal Blade Records in 2019. Theories of Flight marked the first time since 2004's FWX that Fates Warning had recorded as a four-piece. Although guitarist Frank Aresti was still a member of Fates Warning at the time of the album's writing and recording sessions, he does not appear in band photos inside the album booklet and is credited only as a guest, for providing guitar solos on two tracks ("From the Rooftops" and "White Flag"); therefore, this is the last Fates Warning album to feature Aresti.

== Critical reception ==
In his review of the album, Trey Spencer of Sputnik Music stated "Theories of Flight feels like a classic", arguing "when a band somehow manages to take the most solid and memorable moments of their breakthrough release and seamlessly mesh them with a sound they’ve been circling around for years, and do so flawlessly, then it is at least worth proclaiming that they’ve released a milestone within their own career. But is it worth stopping the discussion there; I don’t know? While it’s too early to start calling Theories of Flight another pinnacle of the progressive metal genre, in 10-years’ time that may very well be what this album has become."

== Track listing ==
No.	Title	Writer(s)	Length
1.	"From the Rooftops"	Jim Matheos, Ray Alder, Bobby Jarzombek	6:52
2.	"Seven Stars"	Matheos, Alder	5:33
3.	"SOS"	Matheos, Alder	4:34
4.	"The Light and Shade of Things"	Matheos, Alder	10:14
5.	"White Flag"	Matheos, Alder	5:20
6.	"Like Stars Our Eyes Have Seen"	Matheos, Alder	5:13
7.	"The Ghosts of Home"	Matheos	10:31
8.	"Theories of Flight" (Instrumental)	Matheos	4:00
Total length:			52:17

Acoustic bonus disc
No.	Title	Writer(s)	Length
1.	"Firefly"	Matheos, Alder	3:15
2.	"Seven Stars"	Matheos, Alder	4:25
3.	"Another Perfect Day"	Matheos	3:25
4.	"Pray Your Gods" (Toad the Wet Sprocket cover)	Glen Phillips, Todd Nichols, Dean Dinning, Randy Guss	3:45
5.	"Adela" (Joaquín Rodrigo cover)	Joaquín Rodrigo	2:25
6.	"Rain" (Uriah Heep cover)	Ken Hensley	4:03

== Personnel ==
=== Fates Warning ===
- Ray Alder – lead vocals
- Jim Matheos – guitar
- Joey Vera – bass and backing vocals
- Bobby Jarzombek – drums

=== Guests ===
- Frank Aresti – guitar solos on "From the Rooftops" and "White Flag"
- Mike Abdow – guitar solo on "White Flag"
- Carina Tinker – spoken word samples on "Theories of Flight"

== Charts ==
Chart (2016)	Peak position
Austrian Albums (Ö3 Austria)	32
Belgian Albums (Ultratop Flanders)	175
Belgian Albums (Ultratop Wallonia)	192
Dutch Albums (Album Top 100)	70
German Albums (Offizielle Top 100)	12
Italian Albums (FIMI)	80
Swiss Albums (Schweizer Hitparade)	16
US Heatseekers Albums (Billboard)	2
