= Inside Out (Fates Warning album) =

Studio album by Fates Warning
- Released: July 26, 1994
- Recorded: May 1994
- Genre: Progressive metal
- Length: 48:32
- Label: Metal Blade
- Producer: Fates Warning; Bill Metoyer

Fates Warning chronology
Parallels (1991)	Inside Out (1994)	Chasing Time (1995)

Professional ratings
Review scores
Source	Rating
AllMusic	link
Collector's Guide to Heavy Metal	7/10
Sputnikmusic	link

Inside Out is the seventh studio album by progressive metal band Fates Warning, released on July 26, 1994 through Metal Blade Records. The album continues with the commercial sound that Parallels began. It was the last to feature long-time bassist Joe DiBiase, who left after its release, as well as the last to feature guitarist Frank Aresti until his return to band in 2005. Aresti later appeared on their 2013 album Darkness in a Different Light as a full-time member and on the 2016 album Theories of Flight as a guest. DiBiase would return in 2010 and 2016 for a number of shows, but did not officially rejoin.

This album was re-released in 2006 in Germany as part of a 2-CD Set with the album Disconnected featuring bonus tracks.

== Original Track listing ==
All music is composed by Jim Matheos, except where noted.

No.	Title	Length
1.	"Outside Looking In"	4:50
2.	"Pale Fire"	4:17
3.	"The Strand" (Aresti/Matheos)	5:29
4.	"Shelter Me"	4:45
5.	"Island in the Stream"	6:30
6.	"Down to the Wire" (Alder/Matheos)	4:30
7.	"Face the Fear"	5:37
8.	"Inward Bound" (Instrumental)	2:34
9.	"Monument"	6:34
10.	"Afterglow"	3:26
Total length:		48:32

== Metal Blade Records re-mastered 2012 version ==
On June 5, 2012, the album was remastered with a second disc of live and demo material, along with a DVD with videos and the album played live.

=== Disc 1 - Original album remastered ===
All music is composed by Jim Matheos, except where noted.

No.	Title	Length
1.	"Outside Looking In"	4:50
2.	"Pale Fire"	4:17
3.	"The Strand" (Aresti/Matheos)	5:29
4.	"Shelter Me"	4:45
5.	"Island in the Stream"	6:30
6.	"Down to the Wire" (Alder/Matheos)	4:30
7.	"Face the Fear"	5:37
8.	"Inward Bound" (Instrumental)	2:34
9.	"Monument"	6:34
10.	"Afterglow"	3:26
Total length:		48:32

=== Disc 2 ===
- All live tracks were recorded at Düsseldorf, February 11, 1995

No.	Title	Length
1.	"Outside Looking In" (Live)	5:28
2.	"Down to the Wire" (Live)	4:58
3.	"The Eleventh Hour" (Live)	8:12
4.	"Point of View" (Live)	4:54
5.	"Face the Fear" (Live)	5:18
6.	"Outside Looking In" (Demo)	3:56
7.	"Pale Fire" (Demo)	4:17
8.	"Shelter Me" (Demo)	5:46
9.	"Island in the Stream" (Demo)	5:31
10.	"Face the Fear" (Demo)	7:49
11.	"Monument" (Rough Mix)	6:12
12.	"Circles" (Unreleased)	6:11

=== DVD - Inside Out Live ===
DVD - Inside Out Live
No.	Title	Length
1.	"Outside Looking In" (1994/1995)
2.	"Pale Fire" (1993/1994)
3.	"The Strand" (1994)
4.	"Shelter Me" (1993)
5.	"Island In The Stream" (2010)
6.	"Down To The Wire" (1994/1995)
7.	"Face The Fear" (1994/1995)
8.	"Monument" (1994/1995)
9.	"Afterglow" (Slide Show)

==== DVD EXTRAS ====
1. Live In Still Water (1994)
2. Through Different Eyes (1995)
3. Guardian (Mike Portnoy Drums) (1994)
4. Shades of Heavenly Death (1995)
5. MTV Europe Interview (1995)
6. Eye to Eye (1994/1995)
7. Face The Face Of Fear (1994)
8. Don't Follow Me (1994)
9. Shortest Show Ever (1994)
10. Guardian (Arch/ Alder Duet) (1994)

== Credits ==
- Ray Alder - Vocals
- Jim Matheos - Guitar
- Frank Aresti - Guitar
- Joe DiBiase - Bass
- Mark Zonder - Drums & Percussion
- Produced by Bill Metoyer & Fates Warning
- Recorded by Bill Metoyer during May 1994 at Track Record, North Hollywood and Silver Cloud, Burbank, CA
- Mixed at Cornerstone Recorders, Chatsworth, CA
- Assistant Engineers - Mike Ainsworth & Eric Stitt Greedy
- Guest Musicians - George Hideous, Fidel Horrendous, Sal Mortadelli, Arthur Letsgoberg, Mike White
- Mastered at Futuredisc by Eddy Schreyer
- Art Direction & Design - Hugh Syme
- Band Photography - Mark Husmann
- Reptilian Portrait - Tony Frederick
