= Frank Aresti =

American guitarist and composer

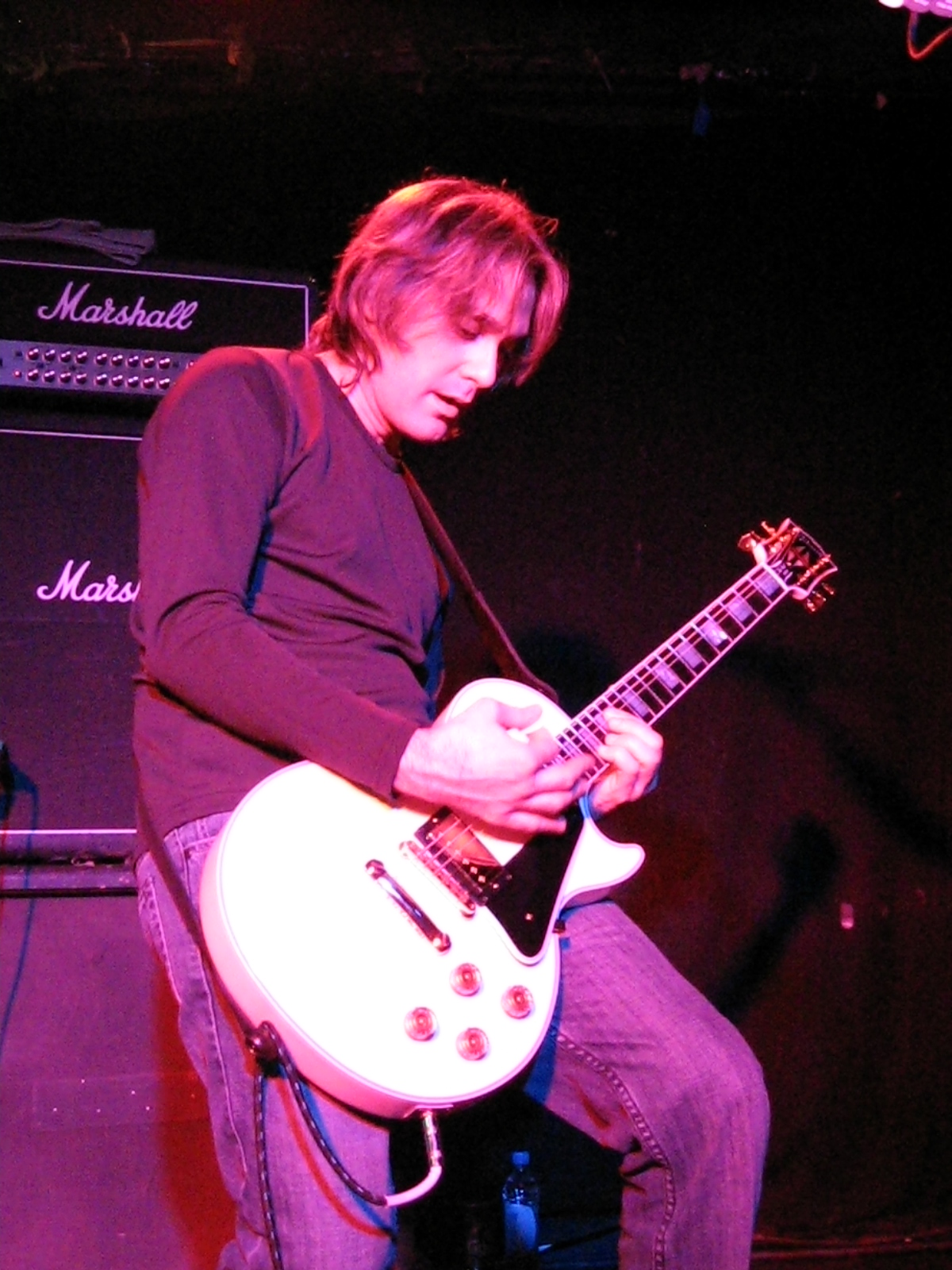
- Aresti performing with Fates Warning in Camden, 2019.

Background information
- Born: September 12, 1967 (age 58); Hartford, Connecticut, US
- Genres: Progressive metal; industrial; electronic
- Occupations: Musician; songwriter
- Instruments: Guitar; bass; programming
- Years active: 1984–present
- Member of: Arch/Matheos
- Formerly of: Demonax; Dragonspoon; Fates Warning

Frank Aresti is an American guitarist and composer and former member of progressive metal band Fates Warning.

== Music career ==
=== Fates Warning ===
Aresti was in a metal band called Demonax before joining Fates Warning. His first appearance was during the tour of 1985, promoting the album The Spectre Within. The following year, he became an official member of the band. He co-wrote "Giant's Lore (Heart of Winter)" along with John Arch. During the following albums, Aresti wrote lyrics to various songs on Fates Warning's albums.

On the No Exit album, he was the primary lyricist for three songs: "Anarchy Divine", "In a Word" and "Shades of Heavenly Death".

On the Perfect Symmetry album, he wrote lyrics to three songs: "Static Acts", "A World Apart" and "The Arena". He also co-wrote "At Fate's Hands" along with Matheos and bassist Joe DiBiase.

Between 1991 and 1994, Aresti only wrote one song, "The Strand" on the Inside Out (1994) album. After a year and a half from the release of the album and the compilation Chasing Time, Aresti left the band.

=== Projects since departure from Fates Warning ===
Aresti has kept a very low profile throughout the years since his departure. During this time, Aresti began experimenting with other genres such as industrial music and electronic.

During the early 2000s, Aresti began recording and producing material for a band he would create under a program called audio computing. His creation would be Dragonspoon, which he released as an album in 2002, the instruments in the album are all by the programming software except the guitar parts.

Since 2003, Aresti came back to Fates Warning but as a touring guitarist only, not an official member of the band.

In 2005, he played guitar on one song from Icarus Witch's album Capture the Magic.

In 2011, Aresti along with Fates' members Matheos and Joey Vera would reunite with John Arch to form the band Arch/Matheos. They released their self-titled album the same year.

=== Return to Fates Warning ===
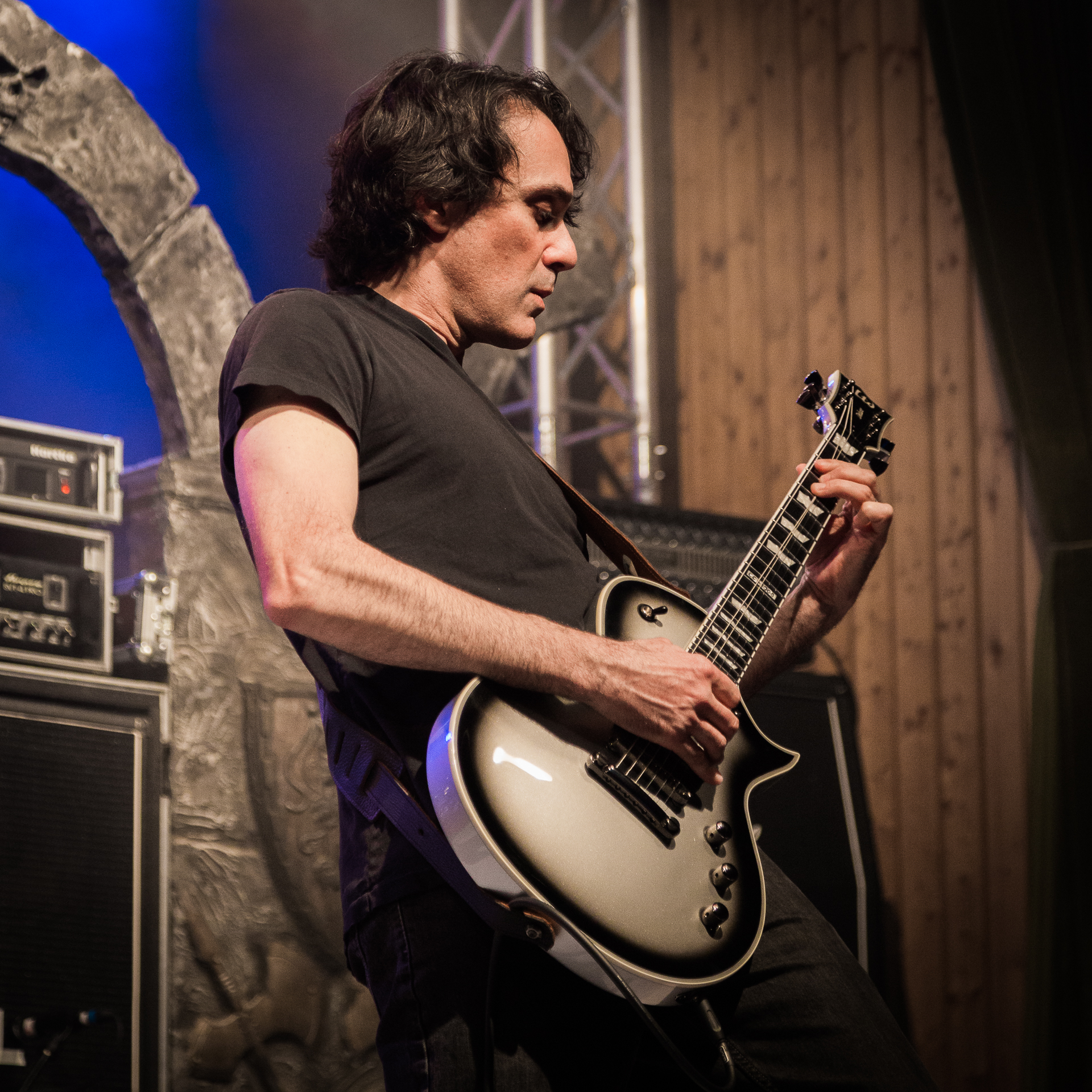
Frank Aresti with Fates Warning

Aresti would become a full-time member once more of Fates Warning in 2005 and remained so until 2016. Fates Warning released their eleventh studio album Darkness in a Different Light in September 2013, and was their first one with Aresti on guitar since Inside Out (1994).

For the 2014 tour, Aresti would not participate until an unknown date due to personal activities that would not permit him to tour. He left the band in 2016 though he remains "part of the Fates Warning extended family", and is still expected to contribute as a session member on future albums.

== Discography ==
=== With Demonax ===
- Play That Metal Mean (Demo) (1985)
- Demonax (2001)

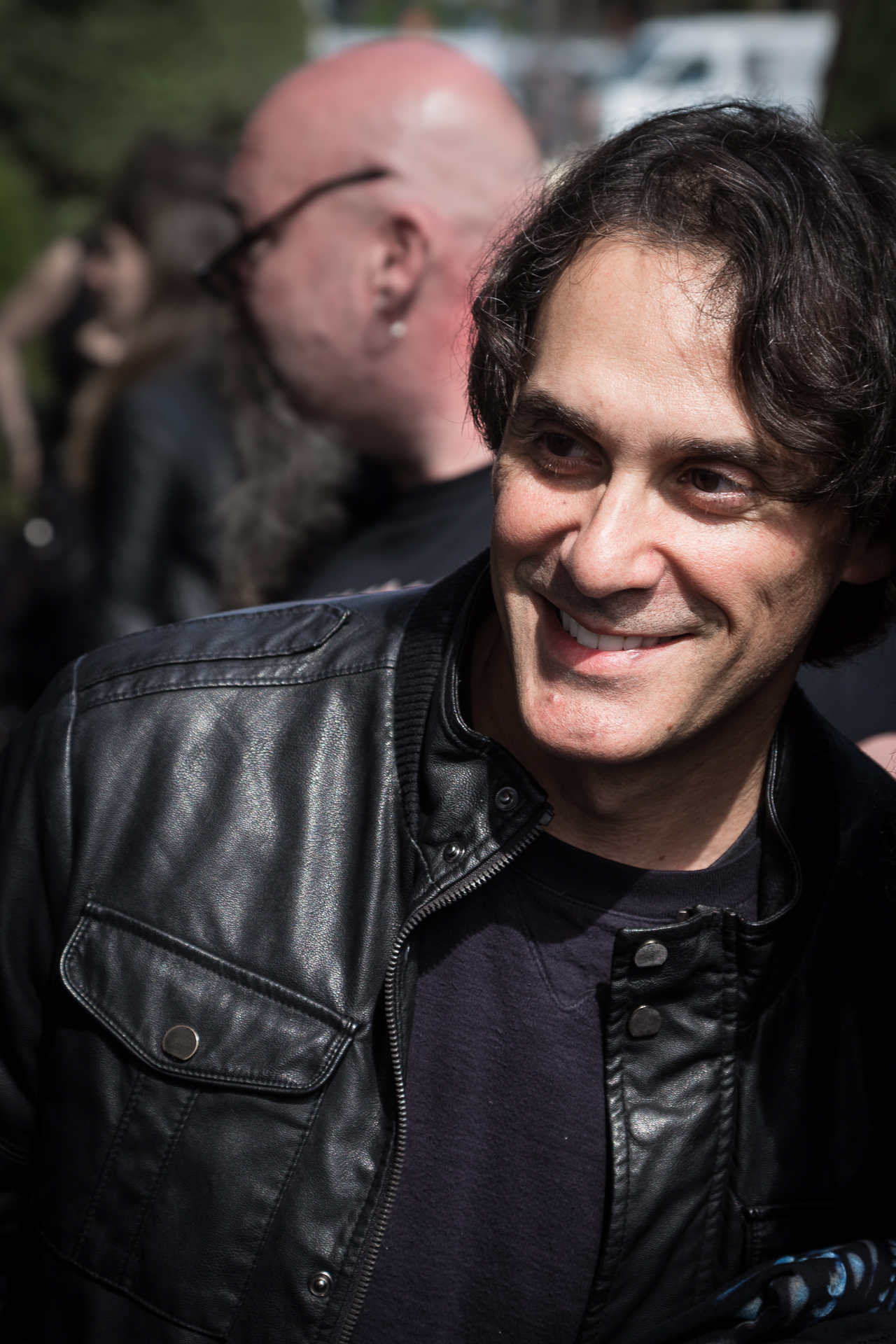
Frank Aresti with Fates Warning

=== With Fates Warning ===
- Awaken the Guardian (1986)
- No Exit (1988) (Reissued 2007)
- Perfect Symmetry (1989)
- Parallels (1991)
- Inside Out (1994)
- Chasing Time (1995)
- Darkness in a Different Light (2013)
- Theories of Flight (2016) (performs only two tracks)

=== With Dragonspoon ===
- Dragonspoon (2002)

=== With John Arch (Arch/Matheos) ===
- Sympathetic Resonance (2011)
- Winter Ethereal, guitar solos in the songs Never In Your Hands, Kindred Spirits (2019)

== Equipment ==
One piece of equipment Aresti uses is a Hamer Silver Sparkle Vanguard guitar.
