= Awaken the Guardian =

Studio album by Fates Warning
- Released: 1986
- Recorded: September–October 1986
- Studio: Stagg Street, Preferred Sound (Los Angeles)
- Genre: Heavy metal; progressive metal
- Length: 47:57
- Label: Metal Blade
- Producer: Fates Warning, Brian Slagel

Fates Warning chronology
The Spectre Within (1985)	Awaken the Guardian (1986)	No Exit (1988)

Alternative cover
- 2005 deluxe edition

Awaken the Guardian is the third studio album by American progressive metal band Fates Warning, released in 1986 through Metal Blade Records. The album was the band and their label's first to enter the U.S. Billboard 200, reaching No. 191 and remaining on the chart for four weeks. It is also the first Fates Warning album to feature guitarist Frank Aresti and the last with original singer John Arch, who was replaced by Ray Alder on their subsequent 1988 album No Exit.

== Release history ==
Awaken the Guardian has been reissued several times. The first was as part of a double album with No Exit in 1992, followed by a remastered edition in 1994, and once again as a deluxe Digipak edition on June 28, 2005. The latter includes a bonus disc containing demos and live tracks, as well as a DVD of a concert from December 28, 1986, at the Sundance Club in Long Island, New York; this being the only known video footage of the Awaken the Guardian line-up performing live.

== Music ==
Awaken the Guardian further develops the sound established on The Spectre Within by employing a greater sense of attention to detail. Decibel characterized the album's sound as "arcane, literate, doom-laden metal," and called the album's guitar riffs "bewitching knots of magic code." Music journalist Martin Popoff described the sound on Awaken the Guardian as "a serpentine and doomy metallic journey through prog soundscapes." He described the album's instrumentation as "persistently powerful but basic," and further characterized the album as melodically "mournful [and] doomy." Robert Taylor of AllMusic stated that "the song structures are too rudimentary to be called progressive."

The album's lyrical content explores themes such as witchcraft and the devil. The lyrics are allegorical.

== Reception and legacy ==
Professional ratings
Review scores
Source	Rating
AllMusic	3/5 stars
PopMatters	8/10 stars
Rock Hard	9.0/10

Robert Taylor at AllMusic gave Awaken the Guardian three stars out of five, calling it "a closet classic from the underground metal years of the '80s" and the song "Guardian" being noted as a highlight. As with Fates Warning's previous album The Spectre Within (1985), Taylor recommended it more for fans of heavy metal than progressive metal, remarking that "the song structures are too rudimentary to be called progressive."

Jeff Wagner at Decibel magazine ranked the album at number 134 in the Decibel Hall of Fame, saying it was "one of the celebrated masterworks of the genre." Adrien Begrand at PopMatters, reviewing the 2005 reissue, called it the best of Fates Warning's catalog, adding that "such a stirring combination of traditional metal and progressive sounds would never be duplicated by the band", and concluding that "Awaken the Guardian still resonates with life today" and it "solidifies Fates Warning's place in metal history."

Loudwire named it in #4 on its list "Top 25 Progressive Metal Albums of All Time."

In the 2003 book The Top 500 Heavy Metal Albums of All Time, music journalist Martin Popoff wrote: "Awaken the Guardian not only ages well, it perhaps improves with time."

In 2016, the album was inducted into the Decibel Hall of Fame. Staff writer Jeff Wagner said it was "one of the celebrated masterworks of the genre."

In 2017, the band reunited with its 1986 lineup to play two festival appearances, playing the album live. The performance was released as a live album. Original singer John Arch said: "It was truly a surreal experience being able to share the spirit of Awaken The Guardian at these shows. We would like to take this opportunity to thank all the fans that have given back so much over the 30-year span since the album's release. To all our family and friends, much gratitude."

Blind Guardian took inspiration from Awaken the Guardian when renaming themselves from their earlier name Lucifer's Heritage. Blind Guardian guitarist Marcus Siepen also listed the album among ten that changed his life, calling it "still [his] very favorite album of all time".

== Track listing ==
All tracks are written by Jim Matheos and John Arch, except where noted.

No.	Title	Length
1.	"The Sorceress"	5:44
2.	"Valley of the Dolls"	5:22
3.	"Fata Morgana"	5:25
4.	"Guardian"	7:33
5.	"Prelude to Ruin"	7:23
6.	"Giant's Lore (Heart of Winter)" (Arch, Frank Aresti)	6:00
7.	"Time Long Past" (Matheos)	1:51
8.	"Exodus"	8:39
Total length:		47:57

Disc two (CD): 2005 deluxe edition bonus tracks
No.	Title	Length
1.	"The Sorceress" (demo)	5:27
2.	"Valley of the Dolls" (demo)	5:33
3.	"Prelude to Ruin" (demo)	7:06
4.	"Fata Morgana" (live)	5:08
5.	"Damnation" (live)	5:44
6.	"The Apparition" (live)	5:57
7.	"The Sorceress" (live)	4:51
8.	"Guardian" (live)	6:40
9.	"Die Young" (live)	4:04
Total length:		50:30

Disc three (DVD): live at the Sundance club
No.	Title	Length
1.	"Valley of the Dolls"	4:28
2.	"Pirates of the Underground"	6:57
3.	"Orphan Gypsy"	6:25
4.	"Fata Morgana"	5:41
5.	"Traveler in Time"	6:17
6.	"The Sorceress"	4:37
7.	"Guardian"	6:54
8.	"Prelude to Ruin"	7:10
9.	"Damnation"	6:02
10.	"The Apparition"	6:00
11.	"Die Young"	3:24
12.	"Kiss of Death"	5:11
Total length:		69:06

== Personnel ==
Fates Warning

- John Arch – vocals, producer
- Frank Aresti – guitar, producer
- Jim Matheos – guitar, producer
- Jim Archambault – keyboard
- Steve Zimmerman – drums, production
- Joe DiBiase – bass, production

Production

- Bill Metoyer – engineer
- Scott Campbell, Steve Himelfarb, Kevin Beauchamp, Dave Obrizzo – assistant engineers
- Eddy Schreyer – mastering, remastering (reissue)

== Charts ==
Chart (1987)	Peak position
US Billboard 200	191
