= Deliver Us (Warlord album) =

Studio album by Warlord
- Released: April 1983
- Studios: Sound and Vision Studios, North Hollywood
- Genre: Heavy metal
- Length: 27:16
- Label: Metal Blade
- Producers: William J. Tsamis, Mark Zonder

Warlord chronology
Deliver Us (1983)	And the Cannons of Destruction Have Begun (1984)

Professional ratings
Review scores
Source	Rating
Collector's Guide to Heavy Metal	8/10

Deliver Us is the debut studio album by the American heavy metal band Warlord, released in 1983. The album was re-released in 2012 to coincide with the band's reunion.

== Track listing ==
All tracks are written by William J. Tsamis.

Chapter I
No.	Title	Length
1.	"Deliver Us from Evil"	6:08
2.	"Winter Tears"	4:46
3.	"Child of the Damned"	4:04

Chapter II
No.	Title	Length
1.	"Penny for a Poor Man"	3:54
2.	"Black Mass"	5:26
3.	"Lucifer's Hammer"	3:50

Japanese edition bonus track
No.	Title	Length
4.	"Mrs Victoria"	5:49

== Personnel ==
Warlord

- Jack Rucker (Damien King) - lead vocals
- William J. Tsamis (Destroyer) - guitar, bass (as The Raven)
- Mark Zonder (Thunder Child) - drums
- Diane Kornarens (Sentinel) - keyboards

Additional musicians

- Bill Krysler - narrator, vocal effects on "Mrs Victoria"

Production'

- Cornell Tannesy - engineer, mixing, mastering
- Maureen Marten - cover art
