= Perfect Symmetry (Fates Warning album) =

Studio album by Fates Warning
- Released: August 22, 1989
- Recorded: April–May 1989
- Studio: Carriage House Studios, Stamford, Connecticut
- Genre: Progressive metal
- Length: 42:01
- Label: Metal Blade
- Producer: Roger Probert

Fates Warning chronology
No Exit (1988)	Perfect Symmetry (1989)	Parallels (1991)

Singles from Perfect Symmetry
- 1. "Through Different Eyes" Released: 1989; 2. "Nothing Left to Say" Released: 1990

Perfect Symmetry is the fifth studio album by progressive metal band Fates Warning, released in 1989 through Metal Blade Records; a remastered edition was reissued on June 10, 2008 together with a bonus disc containing studio demos, as well as a DVD of live performances from the 1989–90 Perfect Symmetry world tour. It was with this album that the band's more modern, progressive direction was established.

== Overview ==
Perfect Symmetry was Fates Warning's second album with singer Ray Alder, who fully participated in the writing of the album. Guitarist and founding band member Jim Matheos describes Alder as having "really started to find his voice and range [on Perfect Symmetry]. It was our second album with him and he did some incredible stuff. It's also when he started to sing in a lower range and we welcomed that because that's the direction we wanted to head into anyway. Before that album, in terms of singing, we were like, 'the higher the better!'"

It was also the band's first album with drummer Mark Zonder, who, according to Matheos, "helped us go in that progressive direction we wanted to go in. It was an even bigger change than when Ray joined a few years before." Zonder confirmed in a 2011 interview that Matheos was pushing the songwriting in a more progressive direction: "It seemed a bit more prog and less thrashy. Seemed like Jim wanted to stretch things out a bit and make them a bit more airy-linear than straight up and down."

"Nothing Left to Say" was featured on the soundtrack to the 1991 film Freddy's Dead: The Final Nightmare. An instrumental version of "At Fates Hands", renamed "At Fate's Fingers", was released on the 1991 compilation album Guitar's Practicing Musicians Vol. 2, and resurfaced four years later on Fates Warning's only compilation album Chasing Time.

== Reception ==
Professional ratings
Review scores
Source	Rating
AllMusic	4/5 stars
Sputnikmusic	5/5

Critical reception for Perfect Symmetry has been mostly positive. Robert Taylor at AllMusic gave the album four out of five stars and said, "This was the recording that established Fates Warning as a progressive band. Their metal influences still dominate the group's overall sound; however, Mark Zonder's unique approach to drumming adds another level of depth and credibility to the music." Trey Spencer at Sputnikmusic gave the album five stars out of five, describing it as "easily their most progressive album to date" and saying, "If you like your prog cold and precise without all the random instrumental masturbation that a lot of others utilize then you should do your best to pick this up as soon as possible."

The album was relatively successful in the charts, reaching No. 141 on the U.S. Billboard 200 (the second-highest position in the band's history) and remaining on that chart for nine weeks. Fates Warning would not have another album enter the Billboard 200 until Darkness in a Different Light in 2013.

== Track listing ==
No.	Title	Writer(s)	Length
1.	"Part of the Machine"	Jim Matheos	6:15
2.	"Through Different Eyes"	Matheos	4:22
3.	"Static Acts"	Frank Aresti	4:28
4.	"A World Apart"	Aresti	5:03
5.	"At Fates Hands"	Aresti, Joe DiBiase, Matheos	6:59
6.	"The Arena"	Aresti	3:18
7.	"Chasing Time"	Matheos	3:38
8.	"Nothing Left to Say"	Matheos	7:58
Total length:			42:01

=== Disc two (CD) ===
Studio demos
No.	Title	Length
1.	"Part of the Machine"	7:03
2.	"Through Different Eyes"	4:20
3.	"Static Acts"	4:27
4.	"A World Apart"	5:38
5.	"At Fates Hands"	6:11
6.	"The Arena"	3:52
7.	"Chasing Time"	4:06
8.	"Nothing Left to Say"	8:06
9.	"Part of the Machine"	8:03
10.	"Nothing Left to Say"	4:51
Total length:		56:37

=== Disc three (DVD) ===
Allentown, Pennsylvania (December 2, 1989)
No.	Title	Length
1.	"Fata Morgana"
2.	"Part of the Machine"
3.	"Silent Cries"
4.	"Static Acts"
5.	"Through Different Eyes"

Houston, Texas (April 26, 1990)
No.	Title	Length
6.	"Fata Morgana"
7.	"Static Acts"
8.	"Anarchy Divine"
9.	"Silent Cries"
10.	"Nothing Left to Say"
11.	"Quietus"
12.	"Damnation"

Amsterdam, the Netherlands (December 16, 1989)
No.	Title	Length
13.	"Fata Morgana"
14.	"Part of the Machine"
15.	"Silent Cries"
16.	"The Apparition"
17.	"Through Different Eyes"
18.	"Nothing Left to Say"

Philadelphia, Pennsylvania (March 27, 1990)
No.	Title	Length
19.	"The Arena"

New Haven, Connecticut (December 11, 1989)
No.	Title	Length
20.	"Through Different Eyes"
21.	"The Apparition"
22.	"Damnation"
23.	"Exodus"
24.	"Drum Solo"
25.	"Nothing Left to Say"
26.	"The Ivory Gate of Dreams"
27.	"Promotional video: "Through Different Eyes""

== Charts ==
Chart (1989)	Peak position
US Billboard 200	141

== Personnel ==
- Ray Alder – lead vocals, background vocals
- Jim Matheos – guitar
- Frank Aresti – guitar, background vocals
- Kevin Moore – keyboard
- Mark Zonder – drums
- Joe DiBiase – bass
- Faith Fraeoli – violin on "Chasing Time"
- Phil Magnotti – engineering, mixing
- Matt Lane – engineering
- Johnny Montagnese – engineering
- Max Norman – mixing, executive production
- Bob Ludwig – mastering
- Roger Probert – production
