= No Exit (Fates Warning album) =

Studio album by Fates Warning
- Released: March 23, 1988
- Recorded: 1987
- Studio: Carriage House Studios, Stamford, Connecticut
- Genre: Progressive metal
- Length: 40:04
- Label: Metal Blade
- Producer: Roger Probert, Max Norman

Fates Warning chronology
Awaken the Guardian (1986)	No Exit (1988)	Perfect Symmetry (1989)

Singles from No Exit
- 1. "Silent Cries" Released: 1988; 2. "Anarchy Divine" Released: 1988; 3. "Quietus" Released: 1988

No Exit is the fourth studio album by progressive metal band Fates Warning, released in 1988 through Metal Blade Records. It is the first Fates Warning album to feature current singer Ray Alder, who replaced John Arch after the release of Awaken the Guardian (1986), as well as the last to feature drummer Steve Zimmerman, who left the band just prior to the recording of their subsequent album Perfect Symmetry (1989). The album's title was inspired by No Exit, a 1944 play written by French philosopher Jean-Paul Sartre.

== Music and style ==
Musically, No Exit is fairly similar to the band's previous efforts, although incorporating more elements of thrash metal while still maintaining the complex structures and powerful vocal performances found in the earlier albums. Although the lyrics are less influenced by fantasy themes which were predominant in the earlier albums, the philosophical element is still present.

== Reissues ==
No Exit has had two major reissues. The first was in 1992 as part of a double album with Awaken the Guardian. The second was a remastered edition containing three bonus tracks and a DVD of live material, released on September 4, 2007 to coincide with Metal Blade's 25th anniversary.

== Reception ==
Professional ratings
Review scores
Source	Rating
AllMusic	4/5 stars

Eduardo Rivadavia at AllMusic gave No Exit four stars out of five, saying "Usually regarded as the finest release from Fates Warning's early years, when their progressive leanings were tempered with no small amount of classic metal riffing, No Exit is a typically difficult album to come to grips with." The album reached No. 111 on the U.S. Billboard 200 and remained on that chart for thirteen weeks, longer than any of the band's albums before or since. In a 2007 article by IGN, it was ranked No. 14 on their list of "Top 25 Metal Albums".

== Track listing ==
No.	Title	Lyrics	Music	Length
1.	"No Exit"	Jim Matheos	Matheos	0:41
2.	"Anarchy Divine"	Frank Aresti	Aresti, Matheos	3:46
3.	"Silent Cries"	Matheos	Matheos, Aresti, Joe DiBiase, Steve Zimmerman	3:17
4.	"In a Word"	Aresti	Aresti	4:25
5.	"Shades of Heavenly Death"	Aresti	Aresti, DiBiase, Matheos, Zimmerman	5:57
6.	"The Ivory Gate of Dreams": "I. Innocence"; "II. Cold Daze"; "III. Daylight Dreamers"; "IV. Quietus"; "V. Ivory Tower"; "VI. Whispers on the Wind"; "VII. Acquiescence"; "VIII. Retrospect"	Matheos	Matheos	21:58
Total length:				40:04

2007 remastered edition bonus tracks
No.	Title	Length
7.	"Quietus" (demo)	4:00
8.	"Ivory Gate of Dreams (Outtake 1)"	2:04
9.	"Ivory Gate of Dreams (Outtake 2)"	3:14

Bonus DVD
No.	Title	Length
1.	"No Exit" (tour documentary)
2.	"Silent Cries" (music video)
3.	"Anarchy Divine" (music video)
4.	"Valley of the Dolls" (live in Philadelphia, 1988)

== Personnel ==
- Ray Alder – vocals, arrangement
- Jim Matheos – guitar, arrangement
- Frank Aresti – guitar, arrangement
- Mark Castiglione – keyboard
- Steve Zimmerman – drums, percussion, arrangement
- Joe DiBiase – bass, arrangement
- Phil Magnotti – engineering, mixing
- Roger Probert – mixing, production
- Max Norman – mixing, executive production

== Charts ==
Chart (1988)	Peak position
US Billboard 200	111
