= Ray Alder =

American musician (born 1967)

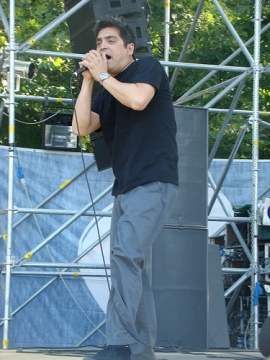
- Alder performing with Fates Warning

Background information
- Born: August 20, 1967 (age 59); San Antonio, Texas, U.S.
- Genres: Progressive metal; power metal; nu metal
- Occupation: Musician
- Instruments: Vocals, percussion
- Years active: 1980–present
- Member of: Fates Warning
- Formerly of: Engine; Redemption

Ray Alder (born Raymond Balderrama, August 20, 1967) is a Mexican-American musician. He is the lead vocalist of the progressive metal band Fates Warning since their 1988 release No Exit.

He has released two albums Engine in 1999 and Superholic in 2002 with Engine.

He also sang on Redemption's albums The Origins of Ruin, The Fullness of Time, Snowfall on Judgment Day, This Mortal Coil, and The Art of Loss, having produced their debut self-titled release in 2002.

He has recently worked with underground emcee/producer Necro for his album entitled Death Rap.

Alder was featured at a show with the band Dream Theater in Los Angeles on May 18, 1998.

On March 16, 2010, Fates Warning released a deluxe edition of their 1991 album, Parallels. This edition has been fully re-mastered and contains over three hours of music and live footage. Parallels was one of Fates Warning's most successful releases due to the commercial success of the singles Eye To Eye, Point of View and We Only Say Goodbye. According to Metal Blade records (2010) Parallels has proven to be one of the most influential albums in the prog and metal genres, despite its hotly debated status among fans as a "commercial" sounding album. Commenting on the album, Ray Alder is quoted on the "Metal Blade Records Website". as follows, "I think it's one of the best albums we ever put out and I'm happy that fans have the chance to take a second look at this important record. The lineup, the songs and the cover art all came together to make a great package when originally recorded and the bonus DVD really adds a fresh perspective to the album."

== Gallery ==
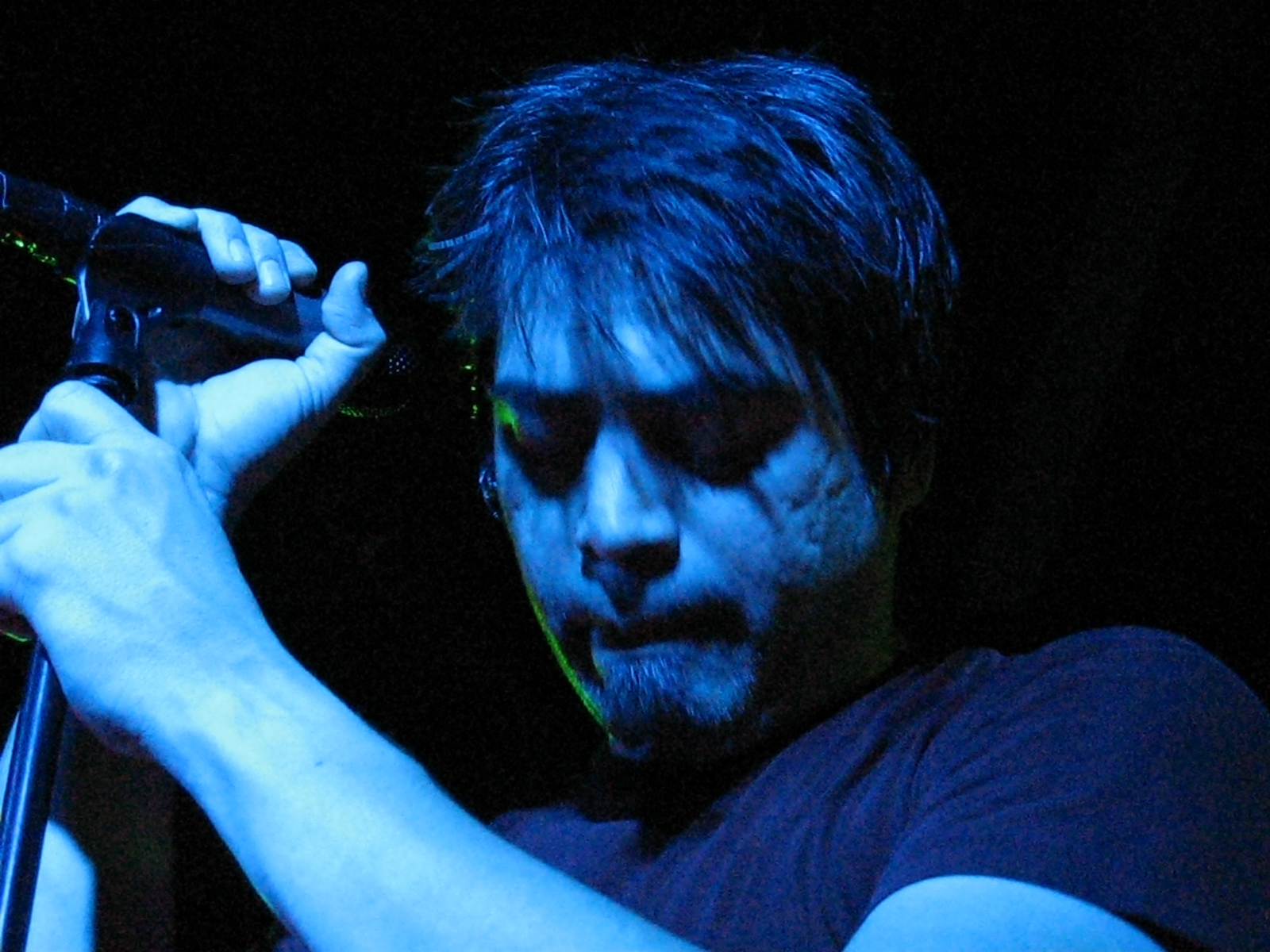
Ray Alder in Fates Warning at The Underworld in Camden, 2007

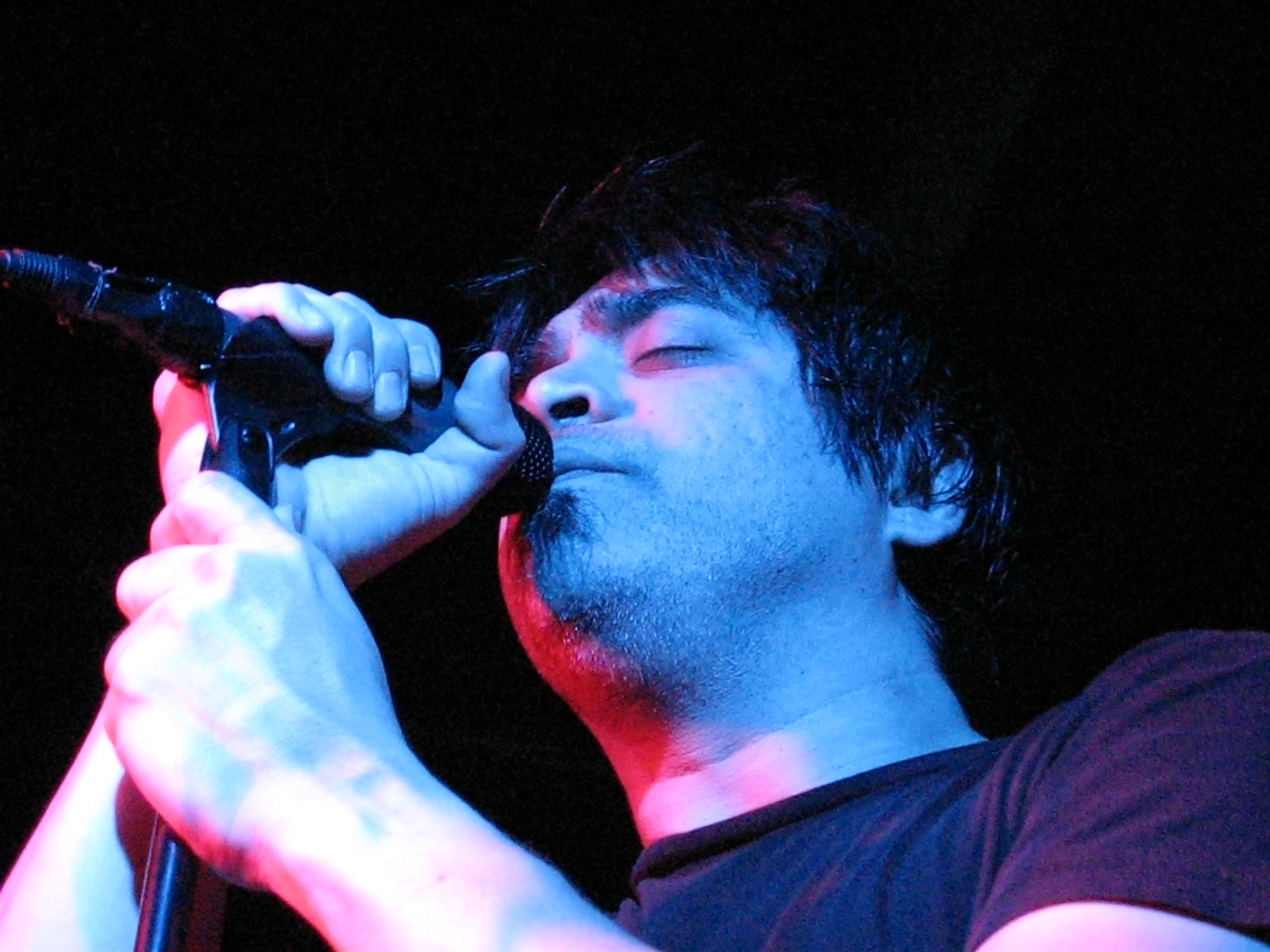
Ray Alder from Fates Warning at The Underworld in Camden, 2007

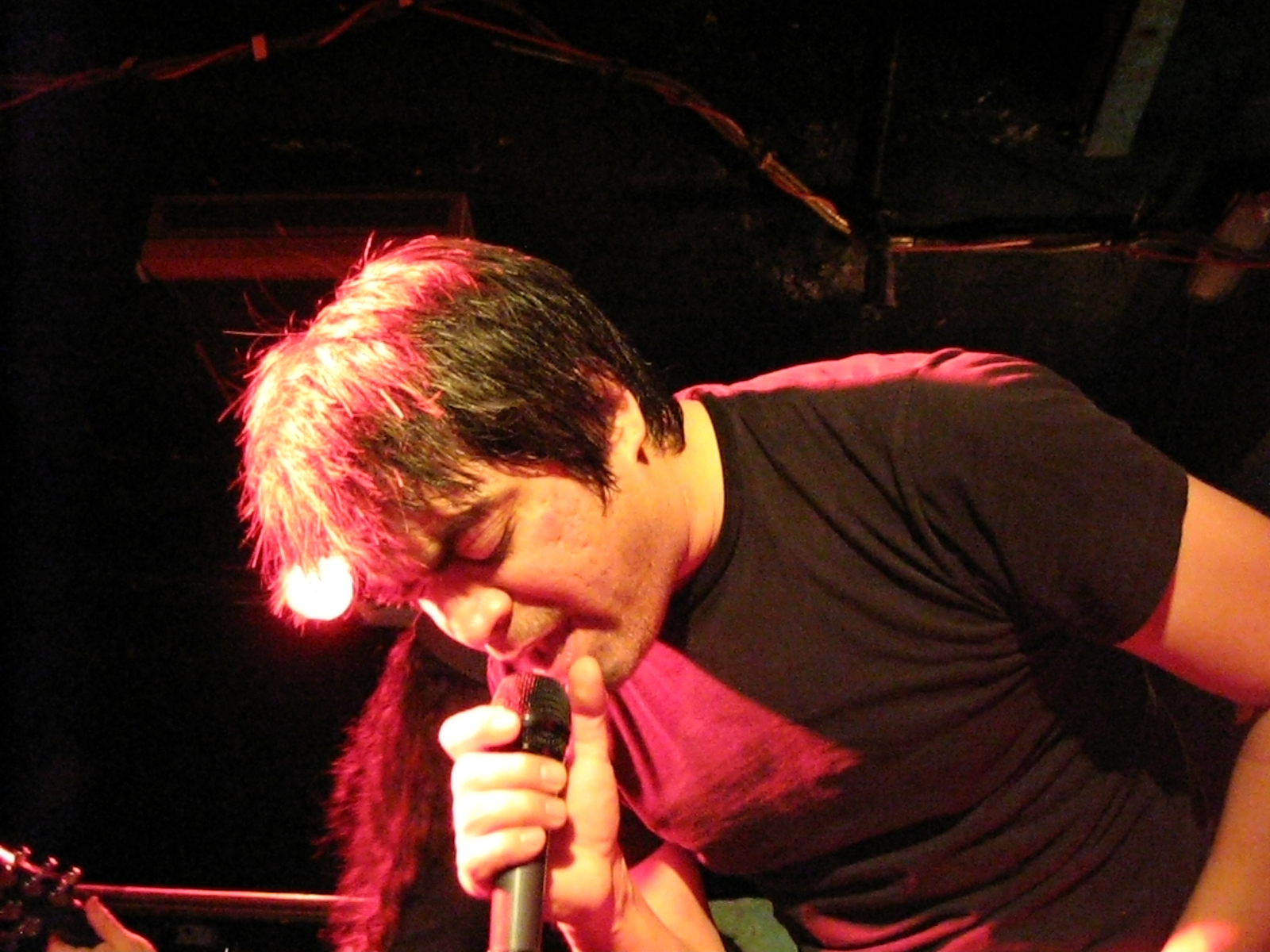
Ray Alder from Fates Warning at The Underworld in Camden, 2007

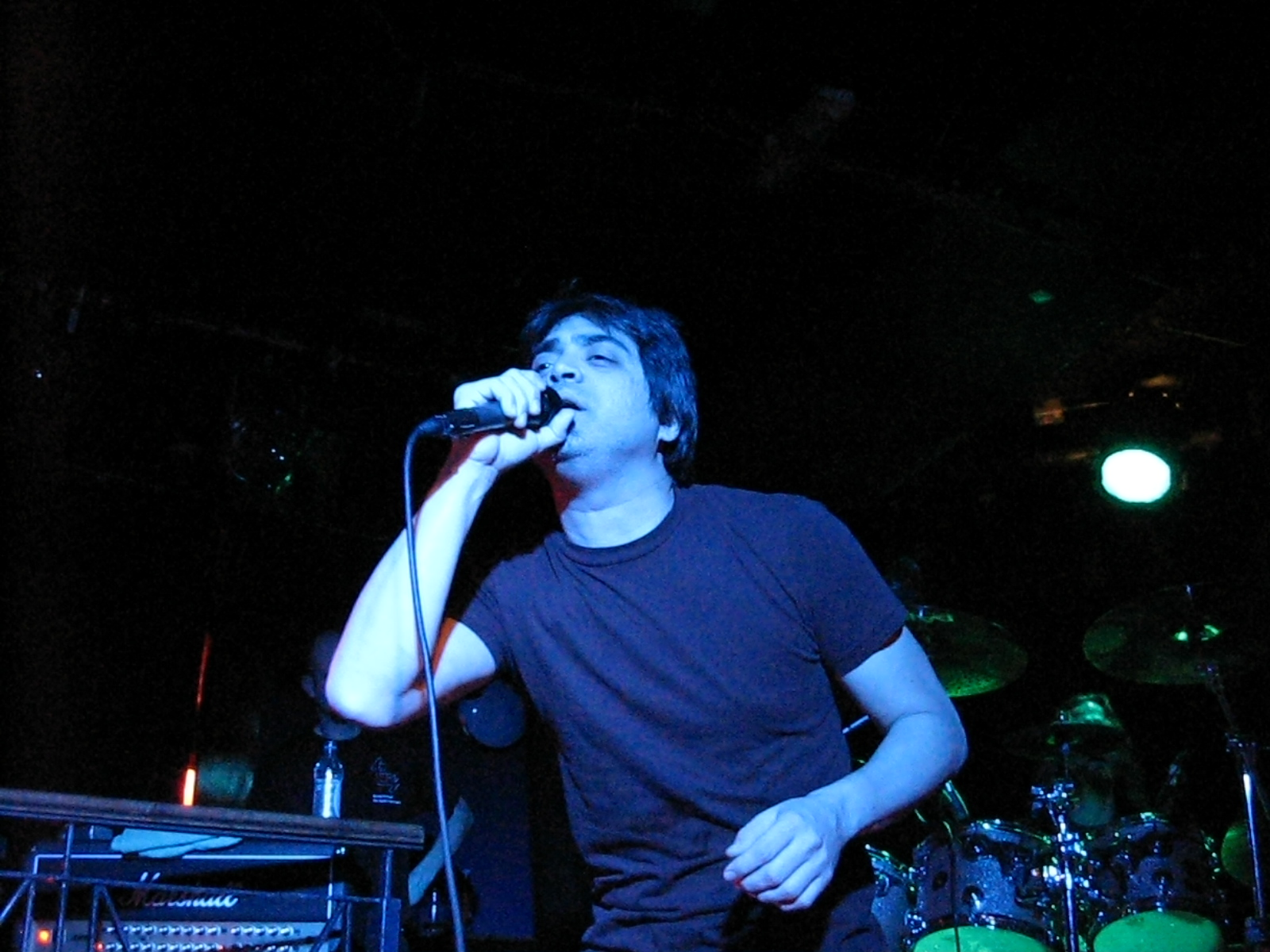
Fates Warning at The Underworld in Camden, 2007

== Discography ==
=== With A-Z ===
- "A-Z" (2022)
- "A2Z2" (2025)

=== With Fates Warning ===
- No Exit (1988, reissued and expanded 2007)
- Perfect Symmetry (1989, reissued and expanded 2008)
- Parallels (1991, reissued and expanded 2010)
- Inside Out (1994, reissued and expanded 2012)
- A Pleasant Shade of Gray (1997)
- Disconnected (2000)
- FWX (2004)
- Darkness in a Different Light (2013)
- Theories of Flight (2016)
- Long Day Good Night (2020)

=== With Engine ===
- Engine (1999)
- Superholic (2002)

=== With Redemption ===
- Redemption (2003) (only vocals on track: Desperation Part II)
- The Fullness of Time (2005)
- The Origins of Ruin (2007)
- Frozen in the Moment - Live in Atlanta (2009)
- Snowfall on Judgment Day (2009)
- This Mortal Coil (2011)
- The Art of Loss (2016)

=== With North Sea Echoes ===
- Really Good Terrible Things (2024)

=== As a guest ===
- Various Artists - Slave to the Power (2000)
- Pentesilea Road - Pentesilea Road (2021) - Lead vocals on "Shades of the Night" and "Noble Art"
- Figure of Speechless - Tunnel at the end of the light (2022)

=== Solo ===
- What the Water Wants (2019)
- II (2023)
