= Parallels (album) =

Studio album by Fates Warning
- Released: October 29, 1991
- Recorded: Mid-1991
- Studio: Metalworks Studios in Mississauga
- Genre: Progressive metal
- Length: 45:27
- Label: Metal Blade
- Producers: Terry Brown, Brian Slagel

Fates Warning chronology
Perfect Symmetry (1989)	Parallels (1991)	Inside Out (1994)

Parallels is the sixth studio album by American progressive metal band Fates Warning, released on October 29, 1991, through Metal Blade Records. The album reached No. 20 on the U.S. Billboard Heatseekers chart.

James LaBrie, who had recently joined Dream Theater, contributed background vocals on the song "Life in Still Water." On March 16, 2010, a special edition of Parallels was released through Metal Blade. This included a remaster of the original album, a bonus disc of live and demo tracks, as well as a DVD.

== Critical reception ==
Professional ratings
Review scores
Source	Rating
AllMusic	3/5 stars
Collector's Guide to Heavy Metal	9/10
Rock Hard	10/10

Eduardo Rivadavia at AllMusic gave Parallels three stars out of five, calling it Fates Warning's "biggest commercial if not artistic success" and "an ideal first purchase for fans of traditional '80s metal." Highlights noted were "Eye to Eye", "Point of View" and "We Only Say Goodbye".

In 2005, the album was ranked No. 371 in Rock Hard magazine's book of The 500 Greatest Rock & Metal Albums of All Time.

== Track listing ==
All tracks are written by Jim Matheos.

No.	Title	Length
1.	"Leave the Past Behind"	6:13
2.	"Life in Still Water"	5:44
3.	"Eye to Eye"	4:06
4.	"The Eleventh Hour"	8:11
5.	"Point of View"	5:07
6.	"We Only Say Goodbye"	4:55
7.	"Don't Follow Me"	4:40
8.	"The Road Goes on Forever"	6:31
Total length:		45:27

=== 2010 deluxe edition bonus tracks ===
Disc 2
No.	Title	Length
1.	"Leave the Past Behind"	4:39
2.	"Don't Follow Me"	5:19
3.	"The Eleventh Hour"	8:09
4.	"Point of View"	4:20
5.	"Eye to Eye"	4:06
6.	"Nothing Left to Say"	7:59
7.	"Quietus"	4:00
8.	"Through Different Eyes"	4:39
9.	"Leave the Past Behind"	5:50
10.	"Eye to Eye"	4:06
11.	"The Eleventh Hour"	7:39
12.	"Point of View"	4:50
13.	"Don't Follow Me"	4:17
14.	"The Road Goes on Forever"	5:43

- Tracks 1–8 were recorded at the Palace Theatre in Hollywood, California on January 23, 1992.
- Tracks 9–14 are demos.

Bonus DVD
No.	Title	Length
1.	"Leave the Past Behind"
2.	"Static Acts"
3.	"Don't Follow Me"
4.	"Part of the Machine"
5.	"The Eleventh Hour"
6.	"Point of View"
7.	"Silent Cries"
8.	"Life in Still Water"
9.	"Eye to Eye"
10.	"Nothing Left to Say"
11.	"Quietus"
12.	"Damnation/In a Word"
13.	"Through Different Eyes"

- Filmed live in concert in New Haven, Connecticut on February 13, 1992.
- Features current interviews with all band members as well as producer Terry Brown and Metal Blade Records CEO Brian Slagel.
- Rare and exclusive interviews and behind-the-scenes footage from the 1992 U.S. tour.
- Includes music videos for "Eye to Eye" and "Point of View".

== Personnel ==
=== Fates Warning ===
- Ray Alder – lead vocals
- Jim Matheos – guitar
- Frank Aresti – guitar
- Mark Zonder – drums, percussion
- Joe DiBiase – bass

=== Additional credits ===
- James LaBrie – background vocals (track 2)
- John Bailey – computer sequencing, engineering assistance
- Terry Brown – engineering, mixing, production
- Stu Young – engineering assistance
- Trevor Sadler – engineering assistance
- Bob Ludwig – mastering
- Brian Slagel – executive production

== Chart performance ==
Year	Chart	Position
1991	Billboard Top Heatseekers	20
