= FWX =

Album by Fates Warning

Studio album by Fates Warning
- Released: October 5, 2004
- Recorded: April–June 2004
- Studio: Carriage House Studios in Stamford, Connecticut; "A Clean Well-Lighted Place" in New Hampshire
- Genre: Progressive metal
- Length: 52:10
- Label: Metal Blade
- Producer: Jim Matheos, Ray Alder

Fates Warning chronology
Disconnected (2000)	FWX (2004)	Darkness in a Different Light (2013)

Professional ratings
Review scores
Source	Rating
AllMusic	3/5 stars
Sputnikmusic	3.5/5 stars

FWX is the tenth studio album by progressive metal band Fates Warning, released on October 5, 2004, through Metal Blade Records; their last album on the label until re-signing in 2019. It is also the band's last studio album to feature drummer Mark Zonder.

== Track listing ==
All music is composed by Jim Matheos.

No.	Title	Lyrics	Length
1.	"Left Here"	Jim Matheos	6:59
2.	"Simple Human"	Ray Alder	4:03
3.	"River Wide Ocean Deep"	Matheos	6:09
4.	"Another Perfect Day"	Matheos	4:43
5.	"Heal Me"	Alder	7:38
6.	"Sequence # 7"	(instrumental)	2:13
7.	"Crawl"	Alder	4:21
8.	"A Handful of Doubt"	Matheos	5:06
9.	"Stranger (With a Familiar Face)"	Matheos	4:20
10.	"Wish"	Matheos	6:38
Total length:			52:10

== Personnel ==
- Ray Alder – vocals, production
- Jim Matheos – guitar, keyboard, programming, production
- Mark Zonder – drums
- Joey Vera – bass
- Phil Magnotti – engineering, mixing
- Andy VanDette – mastering
