= Warlord (California band) =

American heavy metal band

- Origin: San Jose, California, U.S.
- Genres: Heavy metal, power metal
- Years active: 1980–1986, 2002, 2011–present
- Labels: Metal Blade, Drakkar
- Members: Mark Zonder; Philip Bynoe; Giles Lavery; Jimmy Waldo; Eric Juris
- Past members: William J Tsamis; Dave Watry; Diane Kornarens; Jack Rucker; Rick Cunningham; Joacim Cans; Rick Anderson; Nicholas Leptos
- Website: warlordband.com

Warlord is an American heavy metal band, formed in 1980 and based in Los Angeles, California. Since its formation the band was led by guitarist William J Tsamis and drummer Mark Zonder.

According to AllMusic, little is known about the band's origins. Despite early appearances on compilation albums, their efforts are considered to have been largely overshadowed by more commercially successful Californian heavy metal bands that formed around the time, such as Armored Saint, Slayer and Metallica.

== History ==
=== Early years ===
Warlord is the brainchild of guitarist/songwriter Bill Tsamis and drummer Mark Zonder, who had made their way down from San Jose, California to Los Angeles. The new band caught the attention of fledgling record company owner, Brian Slagel, whose label, Metal Blade Records, had recently issued Metal Massacre, a compilation featuring up and coming local metal bands such as Malice, Steeler, Ratt, and Metallica. An aficionado of the new wave of British heavy metal and admirer of the European metal aesthetic, Slagel was impressed by Warlord's semi-progressive style inspired by such diverse acts as Rainbow, Angel Witch, and Jethro Tull. Slagel decided to offer the band a spot on his next compilation and Warlord would make their vinyl debut with "Lucifer's Hammer" on 1982's Metal Massacre II. Earning rave reviews, Warlord made a repeat appearance with "Mrs. Victoria" on Metal Massacre III and were signed to Metal Blade for their 1983 Deliver Us 6-song mini-album which got the band featured in important publications such as Kerrang!.

Adding further intrigue to the growing Warlord mystique was the band members' use of pseudonyms such as 'Destroyer' (Tsamis), 'Thunderchild' (Zonder), 'Damien King' (vocalist Jack Rucker), and 'Sentinel' (keyboardist Diane Kornarens) as well as Warlord's refusal to become just another LA club act, opting to present themselves on a grander scale instead. To that end, the band rented The Raymond Theatre to stage what would turn out to be the only Warlord live performance. It was filmed and recorded - without an audience present - for the group's first full-length release, And the Cannons of Destruction Have Begun..., issued in October 1984 and accompanied by a VHS home video release of the same name (now in DVD). The album featured 2 brand new tracks, "Soliloquy" and "MCMLXXXIV", as well as both cuts from the "Lost And Lonely Days" / "Aliens" 12" single released earlier that same year. Tsamis, Zonder, and Kornarens were joined by bassist Dave Watry ('Archangel') and new vocalist Rick Cunningham ('Damien King II'). A third vocalist worked shortly with the band (even if just in studio recording and never on a stage): Rick Anderson, also known as "Damien King III".

=== Post-Warlord activities and first reunion ===
The inability to retain a working line-up, that is the difficulty in procuring a sure-fire vocalist led to inner tensions and despair, thus Warlord finally ground to a halt in 1986, with Tsamis moving from California to Florida and eventually undergoing a spiritual conversion. The band's label, Metal Blade, would issue Thy Kingdom Come, a quasi-Best Of, in December of that same year. An extended version, including the whole Deliver Us EP, followed in 1989, titled Best of Warlord. It was the first time the band's music had been issued on compact disc.

Tsamis initially recorded an acoustic demo under the name Lordian Winds and worked for years on a project called 'My Name Is Man' (a 75-minute music video concept): an epic story based on John Milton's 'Paradise Lost' and similar to Homer's 'Iliad' and 'Odyssey'. Hopes of turning it into a proper movie never came to fruition as no producer could be found to take on the project. Tsamis next formed a new Christian apocalyptic-themed venture called Lordian Guard with his wife, Vidonne Sayre Riemenschneider, serving as lead vocalist. Lordian Guard issued two albums, Lordian Guard (1995) and Sinners in the Hands of an Angry God (1997) through Germany's Hellion Records. Many of the songs, especially those on the self-titled record, had originally been planned for inclusion on the unreleased My Name Is Man album or a second Warlord full-length. A third album, titled The Holy Empire, was planned but never materialized as the project was disbanded.

Following Warlord's demise, drummer Mark Zonder would retain the band's practice facility in the San Fernando Valley, expanding and building it into one of the top rehearsal spots in the Northern Los Angeles area over the next several years. He also kept busy as a studio drum consultant and in-demand session player, including a stint with Animotion offshoot Plane English, and eventually joined Metal Blade recording artists, Fates Warning, in time for 1989's Perfect Symmetry. Zonder's association with Fates would last a decade and a half covering a total of six studio and two live albums. In 2004, Zonder announced that FWX would be his last album with the band and he left the following year. He began to collaborate with fellow San Diego, CA-based multi-instrumentalist Wayne Findlay (Michael Schenker Group, Vinnie Moore) in a new band called Temple Within who released their eponymous debut album under the name Slavior in 2007 on Inside Out Music.

Retaining a considerable underground following as a much beloved cult band over the years, Warlord reformed in 2002. Original members Tsamis and Zonder were joined by HammerFall vocalist Joacim Cans, a long-time Warlord admirer whose band had in fact covered the Deliver Us classic 'Child of the Damned' on their debut album, Glory to the Brave, in 1997. Warlord issued Rising Out of the Ashes via Italian Athreia Records (which in turn sub-licensed it to German Drakkar Records), re-recording several tracks that had previously appeared on the Lordian Guard albums, however with the traditional heavier sound of Warlord. That same year, Tsamis, Zonder and Cans, backed by members of the Italian band Black Jester, played their first ever live shows at the Wacken Open Air festival.

Until 2011 no further activities had taken place, but vocalist Joacim Cans stated in a February 2009 interview with the Italian metal magazine, Metal Maniac, that another album might be in the realm of possibility should there be sufficient label interest. The continued demand for Warlord has been evidenced by numerous invitations to play concerts in Germany, Italy and Greece, most importantly to headline the summer 2009 festival Headbangers Open Air in Hamburg; however, Tsamis and Zonder declined for various reasons. Nevertheless, the musical legacy of 'Warlord' continued to live through its cult following in Europe despite the passing of years.

=== Second reunion, death of Tsamis and new studio effort ===
In late 2011, Bill Tsamis announced in the band's fan (The Warlord Battle Choir) page on Facebook that the band was once again in the studio. Subsequently, a snippet of an upcoming song was released by Mark Zonder on YouTube. At that time Tsamis declined to reveal the name of the vocalist that would be used. On March 12, 2012, on the eve of his 51st birthday, Tsamis surprised Warlord fans with the first Warlord song in 10 years, called "Night of the Fury". It was then also revealed that vocalist duties were once again handled by Rick Anderson (Damien King III) whose stint with Martiria had just ended. In August 2012, Warlord announced that it would headline the 2013 Keep It True XVI Festival. This announcement was followed by two more dates in Greece in Athens and Thessaloniki.

In October 2012, the band's 1984 EP "Lost and lonely days/Aliens" was remastered and re-released via the label Sons of a dream music.

In March 2013, Warlord released a new studio album, titled The Holy Empire. The album was received positively by the metal press. Two live performances (featuring vocalist Giles Lavery) in Athens on April 27, 2013, and April 28, 2013, were sold out.

In September 2013, Warlord announced that their new singer will be the Cypriot Nicholas Leptos, known for his works with Arrayan Path, Astronomikon, Prodigal Earth, Diphtheria and Gangland.

In March 2014, Warlord announced that bass player duties for the 2014 Tour had been assigned to Shadow Gallery's Gary Wehrkamp due to scheduling issues with Philip Bynoe.

In May 2021, guitarist, composer and founder of Warlord Bill Tsamis died.

=== Third reunion ===
On April 10, 2023, Warlord announced they had reformed with a line-up featuring Mark Zonder (drums), Giles Lavery (vocals), Philip Bynoe (bass), and Jimmy Waldo (keys) with the guitarist positions to be announced at a later date, the band will play select shows in 2024 in tribute to band co-founder Bill Tsamis.

In 2025, the band participated in the Hell's Heroes music festival held at the White Oak Music Hall in Houston.

== Members ==
Current

- Mark Zonder – drums (1980–1986, 2001–2002, 2011–present)
- Philip Bynoe – bass (2013–present)
- Giles Lavery – vocals (2013, 2023–present)
- Jimmy Waldo – Keys (2023–present)
- Eric Juris – Guitars (2023-present)
- Diego Pires - Guitars (2025)

Former

- William J Tsamis – guitars, bass, keyboards (1980–1986, 2001–2002, 2011–2021, died 2021)
- Jack Rucker – vocals (Damien King) (1981–1983)
- Rick Cunningham – vocals (Damien King II) (1984–1986)
- Rick Anderson – vocals (1986, 2011–2013)
- Joacim Cans – vocals (2001–2002)
- Nicholas Leptos – vocals (2014–2017)
- Joe Hall – bass (1980–1981)
- Rik Fox – bass (1982)
- Dave Watry – bass (Archangel) (1984–1986)
- Jerry Alcevia – keyboards (1981)
- Diane Kornarens – keyboards (Sentinel) (1981–1986)

Live

- Paulo Viani – guitar (2002, 2013–2017)
- Angelo Vafeiadis – keyboards (2013–2017)
- Philip Bynoe – bass (2013)
- Gary Wehrkamp – bass (2014)
- Pasko – bass (2002)
- Daniele Soravia – keyboards (2002)
- Giles Lavery – vocals (2013)

Timeline

== Discography ==
=== Studio albums ===
- Deliver Us (1983) (EP)
- And the Cannons of Destruction Have Begun... (1984)
- Rising Out of the Ashes (2002)
- The Holy Empire (2013)
- The Hunt for Damien (2015)(Remix)
- Free Spirit Soar (2024)
- The Lost Archangel (2025)

=== Live albums ===
- Live in Athens 2013 (2015)

=== Singles ===
- Lost and Lonely Days / Aliens (12-inch single) (1984)

=== Compilations ===
- Metal Massacre II "Lucifer's Hammer"
- Metal Massacre III "Mrs. Victoria"
- Best of Metal Massacre "Mrs. Victoria"
- Thy Kingdom Come (1986)
- Best of Warlord (1989)
- The Ten Commandments (Warlord Through the Years) (2014)
- From the Ashes to the Archive - The Hot Pursuit Continues (2024)
