= Evergrey discography =

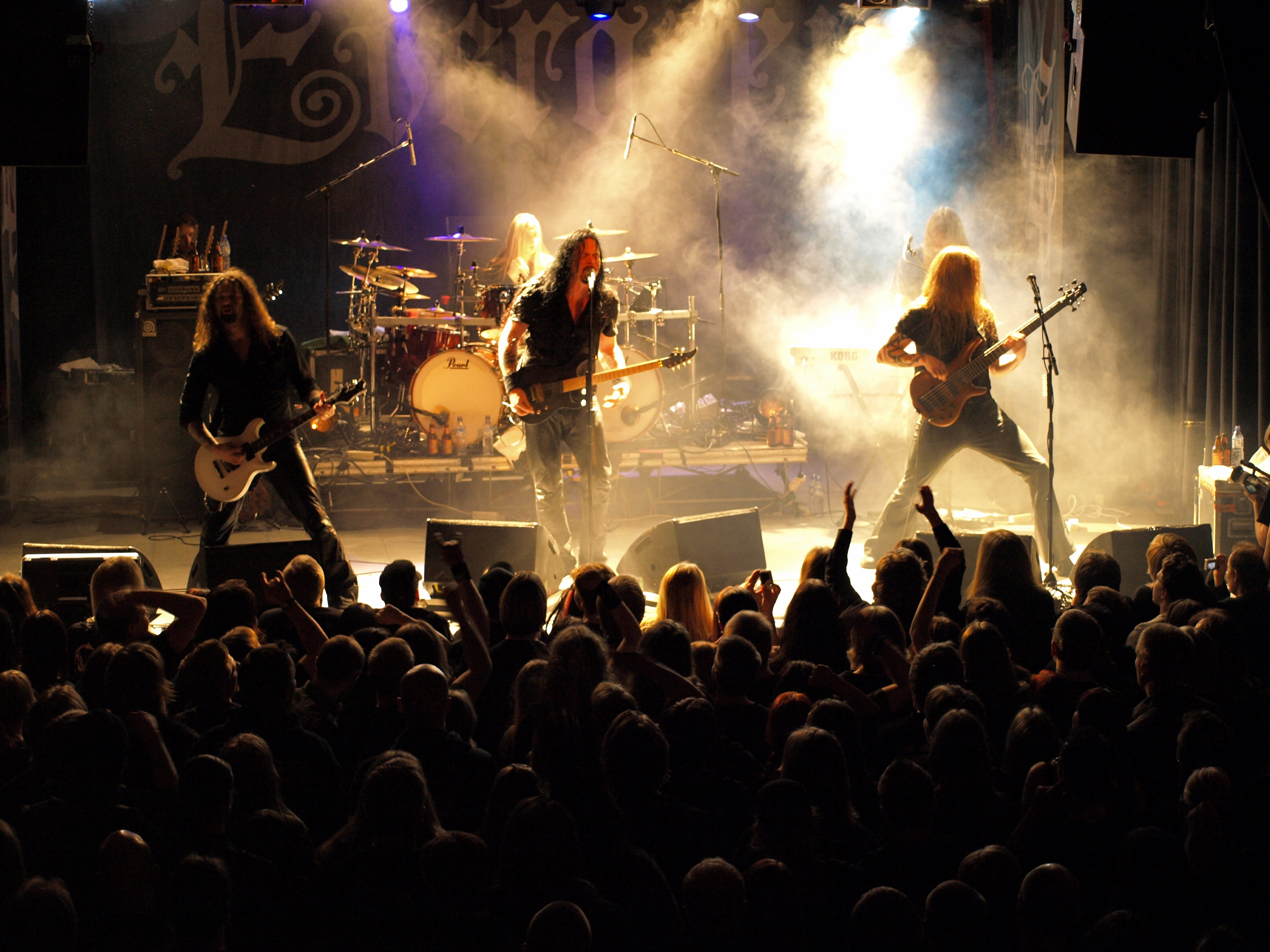
Evergrey performing in 2008

This is the discography for Swedish progressive metal band Evergrey.

== Studio albums ==
Title	Album details	Peak chart positions			
Title	Album details	SWE	FRA	FIN	GER
The Dark Discovery	Released: 1998; Label: Gothenburg Noiseworks, GNW Records; Formats: CD	—	—	—	—
Solitude, Dominance, Tragedy	Released: 17 May 1999; Label: Gothenburg Noiseworks, Hall of Sermon; Formats: CD	—	—	—	—
In Search of Truth	Released: 18 September 2001; Label: Inside Out Music, Nothing to Say; Formats: CD, digital download	59	—	—	—
Recreation Day	Released: 11 March 2003; Label: Inside Out Music; Formats: CD, LP, digital download	18	148	—	—
The Inner Circle	Released: 27 April 2004; Label: Inside Out Music; Formats: CD, LP, digital download	24	189	—	—
Monday Morning Apocalypse	Released: 4 April 2006; Label: Inside Out Music, SPV; Formats: CD, digital download	6	—	—	—
Torn	Released: 19 September 2008; Label: Steamhammer/SPV; Formats: CD, digital download	4	185	—	—
Glorious Collision	Released: 22 February 2011; Label: Steamhammer/SPV; Formats: CD, LP	8	—	36	—
Hymns for the Broken	Released: 26 September 2014; Label: AFM; Formats: CD, LP	43	—	24	62
The Storm Within	Released: 9 September 2016; Label: AFM; Formats: CD, LP, download	29	—	48	39
The Atlantic	Released: 15 January 2019; Label: AFM; Formats: CD, LP, download	37	166	—	15
Escape of the Phoenix	Released: 26 February 2021; Label: AFM; Formats: CD, LP, download	30	—	48	12
A Heartless Portrait (The Orphean Testament)	Released: 20 May 2022; Label: Napalm; Formats: CD, LP, download	54	—	—	12
Theories of Emptiness	Released: 7 June 2024; Label: Napalm; Formats: CD, LP, download	13	—	—	20
Architects of a New Weave	Released: 5 June 2026; Label: Napalm; Formats: CD, LP, download	6	—	—	30
"—" denotes a recording that did not chart or was not released in that territory.

== Compilation albums ==
Title	Album details
A Decade and a Half	Released: 22 November 2011; Label: Steamhammer; Formats: CD, digital download

== Live albums ==
Title	Album details
A Night to Remember	Released: 15 March 2005; Label: Inside Out Music, SPV; Formats: CD, digital download
Before The Aftermath	Released: 28 January 2022; Label: AFM Records; Formats: 2-CD/Digpak Blu-ray, 3-LP, digital download

== Video albums ==
Title	Video details	Peak chart positions
Title	Video details	SWE
A Night to Remember	Released: 15 March 2005; Label: Inside Out Music; Formats: DVD	1
Before The Aftermath	Released: 28 January 2022; Label: AFM Records; Formats: 2-CD/Digpak Blu-ray	—
"—" denotes a recording that did not chart or was not released in that territory.

== Singles ==
Year	Title	Peak chart positions	Certifications	Album
Year	Title	SWE	Certifications	Album
2003	"I'm Sorry"	—		Recreation Day
2006	"Monday Morning Apocalypse"	19		Monday Morning Apocalypse
2011	"Wrong"	—	SWE: Gold	Glorious Collision
2014	"King of Errors"	—		Hymns for the Broken
"—" denotes a recording that did not chart or was not released in that territory.

== Music videos ==
Year	Title	Directed	Album
1998	"For Every Tear That Falls"	—	The Dark Discovery
2001	"The Masterplan"	—	In Search of Truth
2003	"I'm Sorry"	—	Recreation Day
2003	"Blinded"	—	Recreation Day
2004	"A Touch of Blessing"	Patric Ullaeus	The Inner Circle
2006	"Monday Morning Apocalypse"	Patric Ullaeus	Monday Morning Apocalypse
2008	"Broken Wings"	Patric Ullaeus	Torn
2011	"Wrong"	Patric Ullaeus	Glorious Collision
2014	"King of Errors"	Patric Ullaeus	Hymns for the Broken
2016	"Distance"	—	The Storm Within
2016	"The Paradox of the Flame"	—	The Storm Within
2016	"In Orbit"	—	The Storm Within
2018	"A Silent Arc"	—	The Atlantic
2019	"Weightless"	—	The Atlantic
2019	"End of Silence"	—	The Atlantic
2021	"Eternal Nocturnal"	—	Escape of the Phoenix
2021	"Where August Mourns"	—	Escape of the Phoenix
2022	"Save Us"	—	A Heartless Portrait (The Orphean Testament)
2022	"Midwinter Calls"	—	A Heartless Portrait (The Orphean Testament)
2022	"Blindfolded"	—	A Heartless Portrait (The Orphean Testament)
2026	"Architects of the New Weave"	—	Architects of a New Weave
2026	"The World Is on Fire"	—	Architects of a New Weave
2026	"Leaving the Emptiness"	—	Architects of a New Weave
