= Redemption (band) =

American progressive metal band

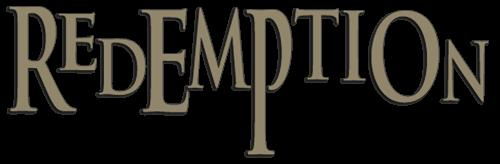

Background information
- Origin: Los Angeles, California, U.S.
- Genres: Progressive metal
- Years active: 2001−present
- Labels: AFM Records, Sensory, InsideOut, Metal Blade Records
- Members: Tom Englund; Nick van Dyk; Sean Andrews; Chris Quirarte; Vikram Shankar
- Past members: Rick Mythiasin; Jason Rullo; James Sherwood; Bernie Versailles; Greg Hosharian; Ray Alder
- Website: redemptionweb.com

Redemption is an American progressive metal band based in Los Angeles, currently signed to AFM Records. The band's current lineup includes members of several nationalities.

== History ==
=== Redemption (2001–2004) ===
The New Jersey–based independent label Sensory Records—associated with many up-and-coming progressive metal bands and responsible for signing Riverside, Delain and Circus Maximus, among others—signed Redemption to a two-record deal including the self-titled debut record which was released in 2003. The band was invited to perform at Progpower USA IV on September 5, 2003, at Center Stage (then called Earthlink Live) in Atlanta, GA. With Versailles now a member but with Rullo being unavailable to perform due to commitments to Symphony X, van Dyk scouted Los Angeles–based progressive metal band Prymary and met drummer Chris Quirarte, bassist James Sherwood and keyboardist Smiley Sean, whom he recruited to perform with the band. As Mythiasin was considered not to be the best fit with the band, van Dyk approached Colorado-based vocalist Corey Brown to perform. Ray Alder made a guest appearance on the one track that he performed on the record.

=== The Fullness of Time (2004–2007) ===
Inspired by a song-writing competition that progressive metal legends Dream Theater had through their online presence, van Dyk set about writing new music. With Quirarte and Sherwood, van Dyk recorded an instrumental which was released as one of the winners of the contest to members of Dream Theater's fan club at the time. Energized by the experience, van Dyk wrote more music which reflected significant musical growth from the band's initial release as well as lyrics that were more contemplative first-person accounts of real life experience instead of the third party storytelling that made up the bulk of the band's first record. With the working title of The Fullness of Time, the band recorded the music and before they could approach Corey Brown to determine if he would sing on it, Ray Alder said that he felt the material was strong enough to join the band.

The band traveled to Celle, Germany to work with producer Tommy Newton (Conception, Ark, UFO, etc.). The Fullness of Time was released in 2005 and was considered a watershed release for the band, marking Redemption as one of the leading progressive metal bands in the US.

=== The Origins of Ruin (2006–2007) ===
With its contract with Sensory Records completed, independent label Inside Out (now part of the Century Media Group) signed Redemption to a new three-record contract. As Sherwood had decided to focus on other things, Quirarte enlisted a musical acquaintance of his, Sean Andrews, to play bass on Redemption's follow-up record, The Origins of Ruin. Newton was brought to Los Angeles where the record was recorded before being released in 2007. The musical core of Alder, van Dyk, Versailles, Andrews and Quirarte represented for nearly a decade a stable group in the band's relatively tumultuous lineup.

The band's success in the song-writing competition as well as the involvement of Alder brought them to the attention of Dream Theater drummer Mike Portnoy, who invited the band to support Dream Theater in the latter's tour of North America in 2007 in support of the record Systematic Chaos. Van Dyk, at the time a senior executive with The Walt Disney Company, secured a leave of absence in order to free his schedule for a six-week tour. The band recruited Sean Entrikin of Quirarte's other band Prymary to fill in on guitar on several dates that van Dyk was unable to make due to work commitments, and brought in another musical acquaintance of Quirarte's, keyboardist Greg Hosharian, to play live keyboards on this tour.

=== Frozen in the Moment: Live in Atlanta (2007–2008) ===
The band performed a well-reviewed 75-minute set at Progpower VIII on October 5, 2007, at Center Stage Atlanta in Atlanta, GA. This performance was recorded and released on DVD and audio CD in 2009. It contains a performance of fan favorite Sapphire from The Fullness of Time, a 16-minute long song that has rarely been performed live due to its length.

Shortly after completing the mix of the live album in 2008, the band recorded its follow-up, Snowfall on Judgment Day, with Greg Hosharian recording keys in addition to van Dyk.

=== Snowfall on Judgment Day (2008–2010) ===
In October 2008, in the process of a routine physical, van Dyk was diagnosed with multiple myeloma, a cancer of the bone marrow that at the time had a median life expectancy of three to five years and was largely considered incurable. Undaunted, van Dyk recorded Alder's vocals and traveled to Toronto, Canada to record a guest vocal performance from James LaBrie of Dream Theater, before disclosing his illness to his bandmates and telling them of his intent to battle the disease. He took a leave of absence from work and underwent extensive chemotherapy for several months at the Myeloma Institute for Research and Therapy at the University of Arkansas, Medical Sciences in Little Rock, Arkansas. With the visionary and aggressive therapy he underwent, he remains in complete remission with an expectation of cure. Van Dyk chronicled his diagnosis and treatment online at his blog as a means of helping others dealing with the disease, and continues to volunteer his time in patient outreach and counseling.

While undergoing chemotherapy, van Dyk composed new music and waited for the mixes for Snowfall to come back from Newton. Without van Dyk in the room, the results of the mix diverged from expectation and Newton's schedule became impacted and he was unable to continue to work on it. Van Dyk elected to remix the record with noted producer Tommy Hansen and the album was released on October 6, 2009, shortly after van Dyk achieved complete remission. van Dyk returned to Los Angeles and resumed work, as well as finished writing music for the band's next release. Snowfall is considered one of the highlights of Redemption's discography by both the band's fans and van Dyk. It contains fan favorites "Black and White World" and "Walls".

=== This Mortal Coil and Live from the Pit (2010–2014) ===
Now back in Los Angeles, Redemption teamed up with Grammy Award-winning producer Neil Kernon to complete work on the band's next record. Hosharian decided to return his focus to classical music and departed from the band amicably, so van Dyk returned to keyboards. Released in October 2011, This Mortal Coil is centered lyrically around the concept of mortality and is influenced—though not to a simply auto-biographical extent—by van Dyk's experience with cancer.

The album's completion and production was rushed as the band wanted to deliver a record in time for its European tour in October of that year so that there could be a new record to highlight and promote. The resulting production quality reflects the pressured timeline, though the album was recognized as having strong songs and performances. The band also recorded a selection of cover songs released on a bonus CD with the tongue-in-cheek title of Songs that One Would Not Expect Would be Recorded by a Progressive Metal Band: Album the First.

The band rehearsed with Hosharian with the intent of him joining them for a brief European tour beginning with a headlining performance at the Progpower Europe festival in Baarlo, Netherlands on October 2, 2011, however he cancelled his participation just a few days before the tour, necessitating the use of backing tracks. The band nevertheless completed the tour successfully and returned to America, taking a hiatus while Alder recorded with Fates Warning. When that was completed, Redemption returned to the Progpower XIII festival in Atlanta to co-heading the first night of the fest on September 14, 2012.

That show was recorded again for release on DVD and audio CD. With its contract with Inside Out now completed, van Dyk partnered with Redemption's original label, Sensory Records, to release its second live album and video. The performance was titled Live from the Pit (a play on the song title Dreams from the Pit, from This Mortal Coil) and was released on September 16, 2014.

=== The Art of Loss (2014–2016) ===
Redemption signed with famed label Metal Blade and began working on a new record. The songs were written but not yet recorded when, on October 5, 2014, Bernie Versailles suffered an aneurysm and was rushed to the emergency room.

The band stopped all work while Bernie was hospitalized and in an induced coma to give him the best chance of recovery. They monitored his progress and waited out of respect, but when it became apparent that Versailles would be unable to contribute to the record, the band decided to dedicate the album to him and recruit guest guitarists to participate in the recording. The band secured extensive performances from Chris Poland (ex-Megadeth, OHM) and Simone Mularoni (DGM) as well as appearances from John Bush (vocals, Armored Saint and ex-Anthrax), Chris Broderick (ex-Megadeth) and Marty Friedman (also ex-Megadeth).

Desiring a return to the sound of Snowfall on Judgment Day, Redemption worked again with Tommy Hansen and released the much-delayed record, titled The Art of Loss, on February 26, 2016. The band created its second fully produced song video for the album's title track, with Chris Poland appearing in the video.

=== Long Night's Journey into Day (2016–2018) ===
When the band was to discuss limited touring in support of the record, Alder informed van Dyk that he was compelled to return to Fates Warning on an exclusive basis. The band nevertheless wrote new music and began evaluating potential successors to Alder on vocals. Van Dyk turned to his longtime friend Tom Englund of Sweden's Evergrey and played him demos of the new material. After ensuring that Englund's schedule would permit him to continue with Evergrey while recording and performing with Redemption, he joined the band and his vocals were recorded for the band's follow-up record, Long Night's Journey into Day. The band turned to Danish producer Jacob Hansen who had worked with Evergrey and many other bands to produce the new record.

With the recording completed and news of Englund's involvement confidentially communicated to the organizers of the Progpower USA festival, the band was invited to return to Progpower XIX in 2018 to perform as a co-headliner. As is the tradition, the 2018 festival roster was revealed at the 2017 festival. Van Dyk and Englund traveled to Atlanta where the surprise change in vocalist was revealed in a video message to festival attendees. At this festival, van Dyk was introduced by Englund to Vikram Shankar, a multi-instrumentalist keyboard prodigy who at the time was best known for YouTube recordings of progressive metal and rock songs arranged for piano. Van Dyk, understanding the value of both a live keyboardist as well as a compositional partner, introduced Shankar to Quirarte and Andrews, and Shankar was welcomed to the band.

=== Progpower XIX (2018–2020) ===
Due to its complex arrangements and the heavily pre-booked schedule of Jacob Hansen, the record took an unexpectedly long time to produce. During that time, Shankar was able to add some small but creative keyboard parts at the end of the process. The record was released on July 27, 2018. It was preceded by a play-through video of Indulge in Color and the band's third fully produced video for Someone Else's Problem, directed by Patric Ullaeus, which significantly upped the production value and visual style of the band.

With Shankar and Englund now members, the band asked Simone Mularoni to join them for their Progpower performance and other tour dates. They also invited Ray Alder and Chris Poland to make surprise guest appearances at Progpower XIX, which they co-headlined on September 7, 2018. At this performance, Alder appeared on the song Threads from The Fullness of Time, and Poland appeared to play Indulge in Color and a cover of the Megadeth classic Peace Sells... But Who's Buying? was the first time Poland had performed that song live since leaving Megadeth in 1987. The band's Progpower performance was filmed in high definition for release on Blu-ray and standard DVD formats and CD, released as Alive in Color on August 28, 2020, via AFM Records.

=== I Am The Storm (since 2021) ===
In December 2022, the band announced that their 8th studio album would be titled I Am The Storm, and would be released via AFM Records on March 17, 2023. The album was co-produced by van Dyk and Shankar, and mixed and mastered by Simone Mularoni, who also played lead guitars in a guest capacity on the record.

== Band members ==
=== Current lineup ===
- Nick van Dyk − guitars, keyboards (since 2001), bass (2001–2004)
- Chris Quirarte − drums (since 2004)
- Sean Andrews − bass guitar (since 2007)
- Tom Englund − vocals (since 2017)
- Vikram Shankar − keyboards (since 2018)

=== Touring members ===
- Simone Mularoni − guitars (since 2018)
- Greg Hosharian − keyboards (2014)

=== Former members ===
- Bernie Versailles − guitars (2001–2014) (on hiatus from October 5, 2014, due to recovery from aneurysm)
- Rick Mythiasin − vocals (2001–2004)
- Jason Rullo − drums (2001–2004)
- James Sherwood − bass (2004–2006)
- Ray Alder - vocals (2004–2016)
- Greg Hosharian − keyboards (2008–2010)

== Discography ==
=== Studio albums ===
- Redemption (2003)
- The Fullness of Time (2005)
- The Origins of Ruin (2007)
- Snowfall on Judgment Day (2009)
- This Mortal Coil (2011)
- The Art of Loss (2016)
- Long Night's Journey into Day (2018)
- I Am The Storm (2023)

=== Live albums ===
- Frozen in the Moment – Live in Atlanta (2009)
- Live from the Pit (2014)
- Alive in Color (2020)
