= A Night to Remember (Evergrey album) =

Live album by Evergrey
- Released: 2005
- Recorded: 19 October 2004
- Venue: Stora Teatern, Gothenburg, Sweden
- Genre: Progressive metal
- Length: 1:52:02
- Label: InsideOut

Evergrey chronology
The Inner Circle (2004)	A Night to Remember (2005)	Monday Morning Apocalypse (2006)

A Night to Remember is the first live album by Swedish progressive metal band Evergrey. It was recorded at Stora Teatern in Gothenburg on 19 October 2004 and released in 2005.

== Track listing ==
=== CD 1 ===
1. "Intro"
2. "Blinded"
3. "End of Your Days"
4. "More Than Ever"
5. "She Speaks to the Dead"
6. "Rulers of the Mind"
7. "Blackened Dawn"
8. "Waking Up Blind"
9. "As I Lie Here Bleeding"
10. "Misled"
11. "Mark of the Triangle"

=== CD 2 ===
1. "When the Walls Go Down"
2. "Harmless Wishes"
3. "Essence of Conviction"
4. "Solitude Within"
5. "Nosferatu"
6. "Recreation Day"
7. "For Every Tear That Falls"
8. "A Touch of Blessing"
9. "The Masterplan"

== Personnel ==
=== Band ===
- Tom S. Englund – vocals and guitar
- Henrik Danhage – guitar
- Michael Håkansson – bass
- Rikard Zander – keyboards
- Jonas Ekdahl – drums

=== Live choir ===
- Carina Englund (also performs lead female vocals on "For Every Tear That Falls")
- Tinna Karlsdotter
- Andy Engberg

=== Gothenburg Symphony Orchestra string quartet ===
- Peter Svensson – cello
- Nicola Voruvka – violin
- Lotte Lybeck – violin
- Karin Claesson – viola
