= DGM =

DGM may refer to:

- DGM (band), an Italian metal band
- Discipline Global Mobile, a British record label
- DGM Racing, a Canadian stock car racing team
