= The Art of Loss =

Studio album by Redemption
- Released: February 26, 2016
- Recorded: 2015
- Genre: Progressive metal, hard rock
- Length: 75:52
- Label: Metal Blade Records
- Producer: Tommy Hansen

Redemption chronology
| This Mortal Coil (2011) | The Art of Loss (2016) | Long Night's Journey Into Day (2018) |

Professional ratings
Review scores
| Source | Rating |
|---|---|
| Sputnikmusic | 4/5 stars |

The Art of Loss is the sixth studio album of American progressive metal band Redemption. It is the band's last studio album to feature vocalist Ray Alder. It is also their first album without guitarist and founding member Bernie Versailles, who has been on indefinite medical leave of absence from the band since suffering an aneurysm in October 2014. To replace Versailles in the recordings, DGM guitarist Simone Mularoni and former Megadeth guitar players Chris Poland, Chris Broderick and Marty Friedman were invited. Vocalist John Bush of Armored Saint appears as a guest singer on "Love, Reign o'er Me", a cover of a song originally recorded by The Who.

The album was released on February 26, 2016, via Metal Blade Records and can be streamed in its entirety in the SoundCloud and Bandcamp pages of the band. A video was made for the title track, which features a guest appearance by guitarist Chris Poland. The video was directed by Brian Cox of Flarelight Films.

== Critical reception ==
Sputnik Music writer Trey Spencer came away impressed stating, "The Art of Loss maintains the heavy riffs and driving rhythms of This Mortal Coil, but returns the focus to the classy progressive metal that defined the band’s earlier albums. If The Art of Loss isn’t considered Redemption’s best album, it’s damn near close."

== Track listing ==
| No. | Title | Length |
|---|---|---|
| 1. | "The Art of Loss" | 5:22 |
| 2. | "Slouching Towards Bethlehem" | 8:06 |
| 3. | "Damaged" | 4:56 |
| 4. | "Hope Dies Last" | 10:33 |
| 5. | "That Golden Light" | 4:54 |
| 6. | "Thirty Silver" | 6:25 |
| 7. | "The Center of the Fire" | 7:55 |
| 8. | "Love, Reign O'er Me" (The Who cover) | 5:08 |
| 9. | "At Day's End" | 22:33 |
| Total length: | | 75:52 |

Digital release bonus track
| No. | Title | Length |
|---|---|---|
| 10. | "Say Something" (A Great Big World cover) | 3:48 |
| Total length: | | 79:40 |

== Personnel ==
=== Band members ===
- Ray Alder - vocals
- Nick van Dyk - guitars, keyboards
- Sean Andrews - bass
- Chris Quirarte - drums

=== Guest musicians ===
- Chris Poland - guitars (1, 2, 4, 6, 7, 8, 9)
- Simone Mularoni - guitars (1, 2, 7, 9)
- Marty Friedman - guitars (3, 6)
- Chris Broderick - guitars (6)
- John Bush - vocals (8)
- Parker van Dyk - backing vocals (9)
