= Reversing Time =

Studio album by Dreamtone & Iris Mavraki's Neverland
- Released: February 29, 2008
- Genre: Symphonic metal Power metal
- Label: AFM Records

Reversing Time is the first studio album of the Greek - Turkish band Dreamtone & Iris Mavraki's Neverland, released in February 2008. Hansi Kürsch (Blind Guardian) and Tom S. Englund (Evergrey) participated in this project.

== Track listing ==
1. "Shooting Star" (4:19)
2. "To Lose the Sun" (5:53)
3. "Mankind Is A Lie" (4:17)
4. "Everlasting Tranquillity" (4:04)
5. "Reversing Time" (4:11)
6. "Black Water" (6:33)
7. "Mountain of Judgement" (1:45)
8. "Mountain of Joy" (4:26)
9. "World Beyond These Walls" (3:53)
10. "Transcending Miracle" (6:16)
11. "Once Again This Life" (4:25)* (European Edition)
12. "Who Asked You to Fight" (4:04)** (Japanese Edition)

Multimedia track : Video Interview* (European Edition)

Total Time - 54.18

== Guest artists ==
Musician	Musical ensemble	Featuring Track(s)	Instrument(s)
Hansi Kürsch	Blind Guardian	To Lose The Sun	Lead & Backing Vocals
Tom S. Englund	Evergrey	World Beyond These Walls	Lead & Backing Vocals
Mike Baker	Shadow Gallery	Reversing Time (song)	Lead & Backing Vocals
Gary Wehrkamp	Shadow Gallery	Mountain Of Joy	Lead guitar
Hakan Sensoy (Conductor)	Philarmonia Istanbul Orchestra	All tracks except demo versions	Philharmonic Orchestra
Ozan Alparslan	Ozan Alparslan Project	All tracks	Additional Orchestral Arrangements
Iorgos Loggos		All tracks except demo versions	Additional Orchestral Arrangements
Stefanos Efthimou		All tracks except demo versions	Additional Orchestration
Efe Alpay		All tracks except demo versions	Bass
Evren Yazgan		Reversing Time (song)	Bağlama
Erim Arkman		Shooting Star, Mankind is a Lie	Lead guitar, Backing Vocals
Berk Kula		Who Asked You To Fight	Backing Vocals
Ipek Kahraman		Transcending Miracle	Saxophone

== Engineers ==
Erim Arkman, Alp Turac (ATM), Mars Studios (ethnical instruments), MIAM (orchestra recordings), Division One Studios (Tom Englund's Recordings), Gary Wehrkamp (Gary Wehrkamp's recordings), Paul Wasser & Mike Baker (Gargoyle Recording Studios - Mike Baker's Recordings), Charlie Bauerfeind (Hansi Kürsch's recordings)
