= Starfall (album) =

Studio album by Dragonland
- Released: 27 October 2004
- Recorded: June 2 – July 14, 2004 at Division One Studios, Gothenburg, Sweden
- Genres: Power metal, symphonic metal
- Length: 49:21
- Labels: Century Media (Europe, North America), King Records (Japan)
- Producers: Tom S. Englund of Evergrey, Arnold Lindbergh

Dragonland chronology
Holy War (2002)	Starfall (2004)	Astronomy (2006)

Professional ratings
Review scores
Source	Rating
Allmusic	3.5/5 stars
Imperiumi	8/10
Metalitalia.com	5/10
Metal.de	8/10
Powermetal.de	Favourable
Rock Hard	6.5/10
Vampster	Favourable

Starfall is the third album released by the power metal band Dragonland, and the first not to deal with "The Dragonland Chronicles". The music for Starfall was mainly written between June 2003 and May 2004 after arriving home from their 2003 Japan tour. The song, "To the End of the World", from this album, was performed during that tour, before it was even recorded. A demo version of "As Madness Took Me" can be found on YouTube.

== Track listing ==
All tracks are written by Dragonland, except where noted.

No.	Title	Length
1.	"As Madness Took Me"	3:57
2.	"Starfall"	3:19
3.	"Calling My Name"	4:49
4.	"In Perfect Harmony"	4:42
5.	"The Dream Seeker"	5:32
6.	"The Shores of Our Land"	6:46
7.	"The Returning"	4:41
8.	"To the End of the World"	4:40
9.	"The Book of Shadows Part I: A Story Yet Untold"	3:13
10.	"The Book of Shadows Part II: The Curse of Qa'a"	2:51
11.	"The Book of Shadows Part III: The Glendora Outbreak"	4:51
Total length:		49:21

Japanese bonus tracks

No.	Title	Length
12.	"Rusty Nail" (X Japan cover, also in Korean release)	5:47
13.	"Sole Survivor" (Helloween cover, also in Korean release)	4:06
Total length:		59:14

Korean bonus track

No.	Title	Length
14.	"Illusion" (Korean Bonus Track, original demo version of "Starfall")	3:20
Total length:		62:34

== Thematic meanings ==
In a 2004 interview with Metal Rules, guitarist Olof Mörck talked to Anders Sandvall, and in the interview Mörck goes into detail about "The Book of Shadows" trilogy and the story behind the songs:

- "The Book Of Shadows is a story told in three chapters, being an adventurous epic with a movie script like feel to enhance what’s going on in the music. It starts out in Oxford, Great Britain in the late 19th century with the finding of an ancient tome, known as The Book Of Shadows. The stories and secrets it contains eventually leads to sojourns to Egypt, and the terrible findings unleashed there, once again springs to life in the last part, which is set in modern day USA. The story I wrote for it is archaically momentous, containing more writing than both previous albums lyrics combined."

The song "Calling My Name" contains sound clips by Charles Manson from the 7 March 1986 San Quentin Prison interview with Charlie Rose for CBS News Nightwatch.

"The Shores of Our Land" tells the story of a group of Vikings returning home after a successful battle. It includes a feast scene in the middle, which was recorded by a very intoxicated Dragonland.

== Personnel ==
- Jonas Heidgert - vocals
- Olof Mörck - lead guitar
- Nicklas Magnusson - rhythm guitar
- Christer Pedersen - bass
- Elias Holmlid - keyboards, synthesizers
- Jesse Lindskog - drums

Guest musicians

- Johanna Andersson - female vocals on "The Shores of Our Land"
- Tom S. Englund of Evergrey - guitar solo and backing vocals on "Calling My Name" and "The Shores of Our Land"
- Henrik Danhage of Evergrey - guitar solo on "The Shores of Our Land"

Production

- Mixed and Engineered by: Arnold Lindberg
- Mastered by: Dragan Tanaskovic at Bohus Mastering, Sweden

Visual

- Cover Art by ToxicAngel
- Band Photos by Olle Carlsson
