= I Am the Storm =

Studio album by Redemption
- Released: March 17, 2023
- Recorded: 2022
- Genre: Heavy metal, progressive metal
- Length: 71:04
- Label: AFM Records
- Producer: Nick Van Dyk, Vikram Shankar

Redemption chronology
Long Night's Journey into Day (2018)	I Am the Storm (2023)

Singles from I Am the Storm
- 1. "I Am the Storm" Released: December 14, 2022; 2. "Seven Minutes from Sunset" Released: January 20, 2023; 3. "Remember the Dawn" Released: February 24, 2023

Professional ratings
Review scores
Source	Rating
Blabbermouth.net	8/10
Dead Rhetoric	9/10

I Am the Storm is the eighth studio album by American progressive metal band Redemption. It is the band's second studio album with their new lineup that includes vocalist Tom Englund and keyboardist Vikram Shankar, though Shankar was a guest member for their previous album Long Night's Journey into Day.

== Track listing ==
No.	Title	Length
1.	"I Am the Storm (Note: A 10 second pre-gap intro track is present before this song, and when combined, it brings the song's length up to 4:30.)"	4:20
2.	"Seven Minutes from Sunset"	4:28
3.	"Remember the Dawn"	8:26
4.	"The Emotional Depiction of Light"	6:11
5.	"Resilience"	4:36
6.	"Action at a Distance"	14:25
7.	"Turn It On Again" (Genesis cover)	4:19
8.	"All This Time (and Not Enough)"	12:36
9.	"The Emotional Depiction of Light (Vikram Shankar Mix)" (bonus track)	6:10
10.	"Red Rain" (Peter Gabriel cover) (bonus track)	5:33
Total length:		71:04

== Personnel ==
=== Band members ===
- Tom S. Englund - lead vocals
- Nick van Dyk - guitars, backing vocals
- Sean Andrews - bass
- Vikram Shankar - keyboards, backing vocals
- Chris Quirarte - drums

=== Guest musicians ===
- Simone Mularoni - additional guitars
