= Recreation Day =

Studio album by Evergrey
- Released: 11 March 2003
- Studio: Los Angered Studios (Gothenburg, Sweden)
- Genre: Power metal; progressive metal
- Length: 1:00:10
- Label: Inside Out Music
- Producer: Henrik Danhage; Tom S. Englund

Evergrey chronology
| In Search of Truth (2001) | Recreation Day (2003) | The Inner Circle (2004) |

Professional ratings
Review scores
| Source | Rating |
|---|---|
| AllMusic | 4.5/5 stars |
| Blabbermouth.net | 7.5/10 |
| Metalitalia | 9/10 |
| Metal Storm | 8.5/10 |
| RockHard | 8.5/10 |
| Sputnikmusic | 4.5/5 |

Recreation Day is the fourth studio album by Swedish progressive metal band Evergrey. It was released on 11 March 2003 through Inside Out Music and re-released in 2018 via AFM Records. Recording sessions took place at Los Angered Recordings in Gothenburg. Production was handled by members Tom S. Englund and Henrik Danhage. The album's lyrics deal mainly with personal reformation. It is the first album with longtime keyboardist Rikard Zander, and the last to feature original drummer Patrick Carlsson.

A music video was produced for the song "Blinded", which saw substantial airplay on Headbangers Ball in late 2003. It would soon be followed by the power ballad "I'm Sorry".

== Track listing ==
| No. | Title | Lyrics | Music | Length |
|---|---|---|---|---|
| 1. | "The Great Deceiver" | Tom S. Englund; Henrik Danhage | Tom S. Englund; Henrik Danhage | 4:18 |
| 2. | "End of your Days" | Englund | Englund; Danhage | 4:38 |
| 3. | "As I Lie Here Bleeding" | Englund | Englund; Danhage | 3:51 |
| 4. | "Recreation Day" | Englund | Englund; Danhage; Rikard Zander | 5:21 |
| 5. | "Visions" | Englund | Englund; Danhage | 6:01 |
| 6. | "I'm Sorry" | Dilbahar Demirbağ | Dilbahar Demirbağ | 3:18 |
| 7. | "Blinded" | Englund | Englund; Danhage | 4:34 |
| 8. | "Fragments" | Englund; Michael Håkansson | Englund; Danhage | 5:37 |
| 9. | "Madness Caught Another Victim" | Englund | Englund; Danhage | 2:59 |
| 10. | "Your Darkest Hour" | Englund | Englund; Danhage; Zander | 6:14 |
| 11. | "Unforgivable" | Englund | Englund; Danhage | 4:28 |

Limited edition
| No. | Title | Length |
|---|---|---|
| 12. | "Trilogy of the Damned" (The track is a medley of "As Light Is Our Darkness" (from The Dark Discovery), "Words Mean Nothing" (from Solitude, Dominance, Tragedy), and "The Shocking Truth" (also from Solitude, Dominance, Tragedy), performed with vocals backed by electric piano plus an expressive guitar solo by Henrik Danhage.) | 9:00 |

== Personnel ==
- Tom S. Englund – vocals, guitar, arranger, producer
- Henrik Danhage – guitar, arranger, producer
- Michael Håkansson – bass, arranger
- Patrick Carlsson – drums, percussion, arranger
- Rikard Zander – keyboards
- Carina Kjellberg – female vocals
- The Mercury Choir (courtesy of the Swedish Catholic Church) – choir
- Fredrik Nordström – mixing
- Patrik Jerksten – mixing
- Anders Allhage – engineering
- Kristian "Rizza" Isaksson – engineering
- Göran Finnberg – mastering
- Mattias Norén – artwork, design
- Rex Zachary – photography
- Lars Karlsson – photography

== Charts ==
| Chart (2003) | Peak position |
|---|---|
| French Albums (SNEP) | 148 |
| Swedish Albums (Sverigetopplistan) | 18 |
