= The Power of the Nightstar =

Studio album by Dragonland
- Released: October 14, 2022
- Genres: Symphonic metal, power metal
- Length: 66:25
- Label: AFM Records

Dragonland chronology
Under the Grey Banner (2011)	The Power of the Nightstar (2022)	Prophecies (2026)

Professional ratings
Review scores
Source	Rating
Imperiumi	7-/10
Metal.de	6/10
Metal Hammer Germany	4.5/7
Metal Hammer Italia	75/100
Metalitalia.com	8/10
Powermetal.de	10/10
Rock Hard	6.5/10
Vampster	Favourable

The Power of the Nightstar is the sixth studio album of the Swedish symphonic power metal band Dragonland. It was released on October 14, 2022. It is the band's longest work by length, at over 66 minutes, and was mastered by Jacob Hansen.

== Track listing ==
No.	Title	Length
1.	"The Awakening"	01:59
2.	"A Light in the Dark"	05:31
3.	"Flight from Destruction"	04:35
4.	"Through Galaxies Endless"	04:30
5.	"The Scattering of Darkness"	05:31
6.	"A Threat from Beyond the Shadows"	05:57
7.	"Aphelion"	02:37
8.	"Celestial Squadron"	03:45
9.	"Resurrecting an Ancient Technology"	05:27
10.	"The Power of the Nightstar"	05:03
11.	"Final Hour"	06:22
12.	"Journey's End"	09:14
13.	"Oblivion"	05:54
Total length:		66:25

== Personnel ==
Dragonland

- Jonas Heidgert - vocals
- Olof Mörck - lead guitar, violin
- Elias Holmlid - keyboards
- Jesse Lindskog - guitar
- Anders Hammer - bass
- Johan Nunez - drums

Guest/session musicians

- Tommy Johansson - guitar solo on "Flight from Destruction"

Crew

- Jacob Hansen - recording, mixing, mastering
