= Dreamtone & Iris Mavraki's Neverland =

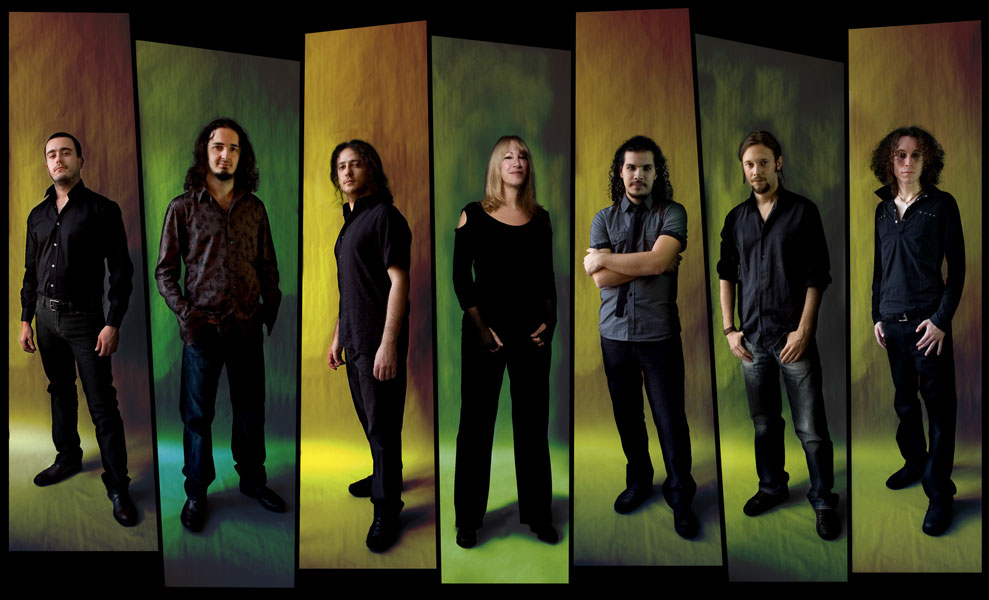

Background information
- Origin: Greece, Turkey
- Genres: Power metal Symphonic metal
- Years active: 2005–present
- Label: AFM Records
- Members: Oganalp Canatan; Iris Mavraki; Onur Ozkoc; Burak Kahraman; Emrecan Sevdin; Can Dedekarginoglu; Guney Ozsan
- Website: Official website

Dreamtone & Iris Mavraki's Neverland is a music group, a collaboration between Turkish progressive metal band Dreamtone and Greek singer Iris Mavraki. Commonly abbreviated as "Neverland", their music can be best described as Symphonic power metal.

== History ==
In 2004, Neverland's former manager Orpheus Spiliotopoulos listened to Dreamtone's first demo, Unforeseen Reflections and later introduced the band and Iris Mavraki to each other. Throughout the writing and composing stages of the songs, Iris was in Greece and Dreamtone were in Turkey. During this time, they recorded a collection of demos (two of which are on the special edition of the band's first CD). In December 2007, Neverland signed their first record contract with AFM Records and set out to record their debut album, Reversing Time.

Teaming up with the guest artists Hansi Kürsch, Tom Englund, Gary Wehrkamp and Mike Baker, they recorded the band's first 12 tracks. The album was released in February 2008 after visiting 8 studios before finalized. Also during Hansi Kürsch's recording sessions, the recordings had to be rescheduled six times and cancelled once due to various reasons, from touring to storms destroying studio rooftops. Mike Baker, the recently deceased singer, reserved the track Reversing Time when he first heard it, without a second thought. This track was his final officially released singer appearance and ironically the song is about a person trying to reverse the time and stop his death.

== Future ==
As of February 1, 2009, Dreamtone & Iris Mavraki's Neverland are recording their second album which is to be released through AFM Records.

== Band members ==
=== Current members ===
- Oganalp Canatan - Vocals
- Iris Mavraki - Vocals
- Onur Ozkoc - Guitars
- Burak Kahraman - Guitars
- Emrecan Sevdin - Drums
- Can Dedekarginoglu - Bass
- Guney Ozsan - Keyboard

=== Guest Artists ===
Musician	Musical ensemble	Album(s) performed on	Featuring Track(s)	Instrument(s)
Hansi Kürsch	Blind Guardian	Reversing Time	To Lose The Sun	Lead & Backing Vocals
Tom S. Englund	Evergrey	Reversing Time	World Beyond These Walls	Lead & Backing Vocals
Mike Baker	Shadow Gallery	Reversing Time	Reversing Time (song)	Lead & Backing Vocals
Gary Wehrkamp	Shadow Gallery	Reversing Time	Mountain of Joy	Lead guitar
Hakan Sensoy (Conductor)	Philarmonia Istanbul Orchestra	Reversing Time	All tracks except demo versions	Philharmonic Orchestra
Ozan Alparslan	Ozan Alparslan Project	Reversing Time	All tracks	Additional Orchestral Arrangements
Iorgos Loggos		Reversing Time	All tracks except demo versions	Additional Orchestral Arrangements
Stefanos Efthimou		Reversing Time	All tracks except demo versions	Additional Orchestration
Efe Alpay		Reversing Time	All tracks except demo versions	Bass
Evren Yazgan		Reversing Time	Reversing Time (song)	Bağlama
Erim Arkman		Reversing Time	Shooting Star, Mankind is a Lie	Lead guitar, Backing Vocals
Berk Kula		Reversing Time	Who Asked You to Fight	Backing Vocals
Ipek Kahraman		Reversing Time	Transcending Miracle	Saxophone

== Discography ==
=== Studio albums ===
- Reversing Time (2008)
- Ophidia (2010)

=== Compilations ===
- Power and Glory - The Best Power Metal Hymns Vol. 1 (2008)

== See also ==
- Blind Guardian
- Evergrey
- Shadow Gallery
