= Long Night's Journey into Day (album) =

Studio album by Redemption
- Released: July 27, 2018
- Recorded: 2017–2018
- Genres: Heavy metal, progressive metal, power metal
- Length: 65:46
- Label: Metal Blade Records
- Producer: Nick Van Dyk

Redemption chronology
The Art of Loss (2016)	Long Night's Journey into Day (2018)	I Am the Storm (2023)

Professional ratings
Review scores
Source	Rating
Dead Rhetoric	9/10
Sonic Perspectives	9/10

Long Night's Journey into Day is the seventh studio album by American progressive metal band Redemption. It is the band's first studio album with vocalist Tom Englund and keyboardist Vikram Shankar, though Shankar was a guest member for this release. It features a cover of the song "New Year's Day" by U2.

== Track listing ==
No.	Title	Length
1.	"Eyes You Dare Not Meet in Dreams"	5:22
2.	"Someone Else's Problem"	7:06
3.	"The Echo Chamber"	8:15
4.	"Impermanent"	5:11
5.	"Indulge in Color"	7:54
6.	"Little Men"	6:25
7.	"And Yet..."	3:55
8.	"The Last of Me"	5:08
9.	"New Year's Day" (U2 cover)	5:57
10.	"Long Night's Journey into Day"	10:33
Total length:		65:46

== Personnel ==
=== Band members ===
- Tom S. Englund - vocals
- Nick van Dyk - guitars, keyboards
- Sean Andrews - bass
- Chris Quirarte - drums

=== Guest musicians ===
- Chris Poland - additional guitars
- Simone Mularoni - additional guitars
- Vikram Shankar - additional keyboards
- Ron Fish - orchestrations
