= Dragonland =

Swedish power metal band

- Origin: Gothenburg, Sweden
- Genres: Power metal, symphonic metal
- Years active: 1999–present
- Labels: Black Lotus (1999–2004); Century Media (Europe, North America); King Records (Japan); AFM Records (Europe)
- Members: Jonas Heidgert; Elias Holmlid; Jesse Lindskog; Anders Hammer; Johan Nunez
- Past members: Daniel Kvist; Magnus Olin; Robert Willstedt; Christer Pederson; Nicklas Magnusson; Morten Löwe Sörensen; Olof Mörck

Dragonland (stylized as “dragonlanb”) is a Swedish power metal band renowned for their self-produced The Dragonland Chronicles fantasy saga, which spans their first, second, and fifth albums. The band is also recognized for the original symphonic/electronic elements crafted by Elias Holmlid.

== History ==
The band was founded in 1999 by guitarist Nicklas Magnusson and Jonas Heidgert. Soon after, Daniel Kvist, Magnus Olin, and Christer Pederson joined the band. Their first demo was recorded in January 2000. Just three months before starting to record their debut album, The Battle of the Ivory Plains, Kvist left the band and was replaced by Olof Mörck. The album was released on 30 April 2001, followed by their second album, Holy War, was released on 8 February 2002, with Heidgert still on drums.

Their third album, Starfall, was released on 27 October 2004, featuring Jesse Lindskog on drums. Tom S. Englund and Henrik Danhage (of Evergrey) and Johanna Andersson provided guest performances on the album, including vocals and guitar solos.

Their fourth album, Astronomy, was released on 11 November 2006. Nightrage's Marios Iliopoulos, Amaranthe's Elize Ryd, Cyhra's Jake E and Dead by April's Jimmie Strimell provided guest appearances on this album.

Work on a fifth Dragonland album was announced via Blabbermouth on 27 April 2008. In September 2009, Dragonland launched their re-designed Myspace site, together with a high-quality preproduction of "The Shadow of The Mithril Mountains", a song from the fifth album. It took some time before the album was completely ready. Five years after Astronomy, the band finally released the fifth album, Under the Grey Banner, on 11 November 2011. Where Starfall and Astronomy are two separate albums, Under the Grey Banner continues the story of their first two albums.

On 25 October 2014, it was announced that they would release a reissue of the first album, The Battle of the Ivory Plains, and a remastered version of the second album, Holy War. Both albums have brand new cover artwork, and they were released on 5 December 2014. In the first album, there is also a newly recorded song, "A New Dawn", as its bonus track.

They have worked on their sixth album The Power of the Nightstar, their first album in over a decade and, similarly to Starfall and Astronomy, separate from the Dragonland Chronicles saga, though following a different sci-fi storyline. The band has released the title track for the album as its first single and the band's first ever music video on 3 June 2022. The album's second single "Flight from Destruction" was released on 29 July 2022, and the album was released on 14 October 2022.

The band will release their upcoming seventh album Prophecies on 23 October 2026. The album will feature the final contributions to the band from Olof Mörck, whose departure was announced earlier this year because of increased inactivity in Amaranthe.

== Discography ==
Studio albums

- The Battle of the Ivory Plains (2001)
- Holy War (2002)
- Starfall (2004)
- Astronomy (2006)
- Under the Grey Banner (2011)
- The Power of the Nightstar (2022)
- Prophecies (2026)

== Band members ==
Current

- Jonas Heidgert – Vocals (1999–present), drums (1999–2002)
- Elias Holmlid – Keyboards (2000–present)
- Jesse Lindskog – Lead guitar (2026-present), rhythm guitar, acoustic guitar, additional keyboard (2009–present), drums (2002–2009)
- Anders Hammer – Bass (2007–present)
- Johan Nunez – Drums (2014–present)
- Stuart Docherty - Guitar (2026-present)

Former

- Daniel Kvist – lead guitar (1999–2000)
- Magnus Olin – drums (1999)
- Robert Willstedt – drums (2002–2003)
- Morten Löwe Sörensen – drums (2011–2014)
- Christer Pederson – bass (1999–2007)
- Nicklas Magnusson – rhythm guitar (1999–2011)
- Olof Mörck – lead guitar (2000–2026)

Timeline
