= In Search of Truth =

Studio album by Evergrey
- Released: 13 November 2001
- Recorded: January–April 2001
- Studio: Los Angered Recordings, Gothenburg, Sweden
- Genre: Progressive metal, power metal
- Length: 47:50
- Label: Inside Out
- Producer: Andy LaRocque and Tom S. Englund; assisted by Kristian "Rizza" Isaksson

Evergrey chronology
Solitude, Dominance, Tragedy (1999)	In Search of Truth (2001)	Recreation Day (2003)

Professional ratings
Review scores
Source	Rating
Allmusic	4/5 stars
Sputnikmusic	10/10 stars

In Search of Truth is the third studio album and first concept album by Swedish progressive metal band Evergrey. Released on 13 November 2001 through Inside Out Music, it is the first album to feature guitarist Henrik Danhage and bassist Michael Håkansson, as well as the only one to feature keyboardist Sven Karlsson.

== Recording and concept ==
The album was recorded at Los Angered Studios in Gothenburg, Sweden from January to April 2001. Production was handled by Andy LaRocque, who had produced all the band's previous albums. LaRocque also contributed musically; playing slide guitar. It is currently the last album he produced for the band, although he engineered the following album, Recreation Day.

The song "Dark Waters" features the Mercury Choir on vocals, who also performed on the previous album, Solitude, Dominance, Tragedy. As with most Evergrey albums, female vocals were contributed by Carina Kjellberg.

Although the album does not have a title track, the lyrics "in search of the shocking truth" are featured in the song "Watching the Skies".

The album is a concept album dealing with alien abductions, primarily based on and inspired by the allegedly factual account of alien abduction victim Whitley Strieber's book Communion. Speaking of the influence of the book, frontman Tom S. Englund stated:

That book really affected me deeply and I think it's very sincere and honest book and no matter what you think about it serves as an introduction. This man believes he has been experiencing something in that way and that it's the most important thing that you got to think about. You know that he believes this all happened to him. So you gotta respect his ideas and cause for that. On this album I tend to reflect more on the personal level of him and try to reflect more on the emotional side of the character - his fears, sadness and all that.

—

The album cover was created by Swedish graphic designer Mattias Norén.

== Reception and legacy ==
The album received favorable reviews. AllMusic stated that "the overall picture is that of a very well-crafted concept album that certainly should please fans of progressive metal", and noted of the concept: "rather than addressing the subject in a cheesy sort of universal mode, though, it is the story of one man's struggle to understand what is happening to him. The lyrics, and the strong delivery by vocalist Tom S. Englund, convey the confusion, fear, and sense of helplessness splendidly."

Metal Storm praised it as "full of fresh ideas and perfect in their complexity" and "undoubtedly the best prog album of the year". Sputnikmusic gave it a perfect 10/10 score, saying that "odd time signatures and extremely technical riffs bounce off of haunting keyboard lines and severely dark stylings in perfect harmony, creating a sound that has yet to be matched."

The album debuted on the Swedish Albums Chart at No. 59 and stayed on the chart for 11 weeks.

Since the album's release, it has been critically acclaimed and is generally considered to be the band's 'magnum opus' as well as one of the best progressive metal albums ever made. Loudwire placed the album at No. 20 on its list "Top 25 Progressive Metal Albums of All Time." To celebrate its 10th anniversary, the album was played in its entirety at the ProgPower USA Festival in Atlanta, Georgia on 15 September 2011. Speaking of the event, frontman Tom Englund said: "Glenn [Harveston, ProgPower USA festival promoter] asked me for a special show,….what else is new as he always does… hrmpff. So to pay tribute to one of our most loved albums, we decided to celebrate the tenth anniversary of 'In Search Of Truth' by playing the whole damned thing. This will be an exclusive for Atlanta and the ProgPower USA show alone."

A remastered version of the album, titled In Search of Truth: Remasters Edition, was released in 2019, featuring live versions of the songs "Rulers of the Mind", "Mark of the Triangle" and "Misled"; "Misled" had previously been released on the live album A Night to Remember in 2005. The original recordings were remastered by Jacob Hansen, who produced the band's 2014 album Hymns for the Broken.

== Track listing ==
All lyrics are written by Tom S. Englund; all music is composed by Evergrey.

No.	Title	Length
1.	"The Masterplan"	4:46
2.	"Rulers of the Mind"	5:57
3.	"Watching the Skies"	6:16
4.	"State of Paralysis"	2:13
5.	"The Encounter"	4:38
6.	"Mark of the Triangle"	6:22
7.	"Dark Waters"	6:00
8.	"Different Worlds"	5:30
9.	"Misled"	6:00

Remasters Edition
No.	Title	Length
10.	"Rulers of the Mind" (live)	5:16
11.	"Mark of the Triangle" (live)	6:45
12.	"Misled" (live)	7:21

== Personnel ==
- Tom S. Englund - vocals, guitar
- Henrik Danhage - guitar
- Michael Håkansson - bass
- Patrick Carlsson - drums, percussion
- Sven Karlsson - keyboards
- Carina Kjellberg - all female vocals
- Mercury Choir (courtesy of the Swedish Catholic Church) - choir

== Charts ==
Chart (2001)	Peak position
Swedish Albums Chart	59
