= Astronomy (Dragonland album) =

Studio album by Dragonland
- Released: 13 November 2006
- Recorded: January – September 2006
- Studios: Studio Fredman, Gothenburg, Sweden
- Genres: Power metal, progressive metal, symphonic metal, melodic death metal
- Length: 60:51
- Labels: Century Media (Europe, North America), King Records (Japan)
- Producers: Patrik J., Olof Mörck, Henrik Udd

Dragonland chronology
Starfall (2004)	Astronomy (2006)	Under The Grey Banner (2011)

Professional ratings
Review scores
Source	Rating
Chronicles of Chaos	8/10
Imperiumi	7/10
Metalitalia.com	7.5/10
Metal.de	8/10
Powermetal.de	Favourable
Rock Hard	7/10
Vampster	Favourable

Astronomy is the fourth studio album by Swedish power metal band Dragonland, released in Europe on 13 November 2006 and in North America on 28 November 2006. While their third album Starfall focused heavily on keyboards and had a more upbeat lyrical tone, according to guitarist Olof Mörck, Astronomy is "gloomier, more stygian and packed with crunching guitars; both furiously fast and bone-grindingly heavy."

== Track listing ==
All tracks are written by Olof Mörck, except "Intuition", by Tony Harnell, Ronni Le Tekrø.

No.	Title	Length
1.	"Supernova"	5:09
2.	"Cassiopeia" (featuring Elize Ryd, solo by Marios Ilipoulos of Nightrage)	4:06
3.	"Contact"	4:25
4.	"Astronomy" (featuring Jake E)	3:20
5.	"Antimatter" (featuring Jimmie Strimmel)	3:00
6.	"The Book of Shadows Part IV: The Scrolls of Geometria Divina"	4:04
7.	"Beethoven's Nightmare"	6:11
8.	"Too Late for Sorrow" (featuring Elize Ryd & Jake E)	3:36
9.	"Direction: Perfection" (featuring Jimmie Strimmel)	4:29
10.	"The Old House on the Hill Chapter I: A Death in the Family"	4:30
11.	"The Old House on the Hill Chapter II: The Thing in the Cellar"	3:08
12.	"The Old House on the Hill Chapter III: The Ring of Edward Waldon"	6:17
Total length:		52:15

Japanese edition bonus tracks

No.	Title	Length
13.	"Intuition" (TNT cover)	4:25
14.	"The Last Word"	4:11
Total length:		60:51

== Lyrical references ==
In a February 2007 interview with Metal Reviews, guitarist Olof Mörck went into details about some of musical and lyrical influences in Astronomy:

- Olof and Elias Holmlid were inspired to write "The Old House on the Hill" trilogy by listening to film scores, and they attributed this trilogy to Danny Elfman, probably most famously known for his Tim Burton's Batman theme and the theme to The Simpsons. Unlike "The Book of Shadows" trilogy from the Starfall album which had the story written after the music was composed, "The Old House on the Hill" trilogy's story was written by Olof, and it took about six months to get the song fully fleshed out and recorded.
- "Too Late for Sorrow" is a tribute to Harold Faltermeyer, known for his 1986 Top Gun movie score and the "Axel F" electronic theme for Beverly Hills Cop.

As suggested with the album title, many of the songs on the album are based around space subjects:

- "Supernova" sings about the beauty of an exploding star (supernova).
- The song "Cassiopeia" tells the tale of Queen Cassiopeia, wife of King Cepheus of the mythological Phoenician realm of Ethiopia, who claimed that both her and her daughter Andromeda were more beautiful than all the Nereids, the nymph-daughters of the sea god Nereus. To avoid the God's wrath, she sacrificed her daughter Andromeda by chaining her to a rock near the water's edge, but the Greek hero Perseus saved Andromeda, soon becoming her husband. Poseidon decided that Cassiopeia didn't deserve to escape punishment for her vainness, so he put her in the heavens as a constellation for all eternity.
- "Contact" is about first contact with aliens who turn out to be conquerors instead of saviors and destroy mankind.
- The title track "Astronomy" deals with the power of astronomy.
- "Antimatter" deals with the exotic properties and mystery of antimatter.

Another point of interest is the song "Beethoven's Nightmare" which intertwines heavy guitar riffs and classical piano melodies to tell the story of Beethoven writing a symphony about a tragedy that is consuming his life, while he laments about being deaf and wishing he could hear a sound "that could open my mind".

== Personnel ==
- Jonas Heidgert – vocals (additional drums on track 7)
- Olof Mörck – guitars (additional keyboards on tracks 11 & 12, whispers on track 9, story on tracks 6, 10, 11 & 12)
- Nicklas Magnusson – guitars
- Christer Pedersen – bass
- Elias Holmlid – keyboards, synthesizers (additional drums on track 11, all drums on track 12, tambourine and shaker on track 8)
- Jesse Lindskog – drums

=== Additional musicians ===
- Jake E – vocals (4, 8)
- Elize Ryd – female vocals (tracks 2, 8)
- Jimmy Strimmell – growl vocals (tracks 5, 9)
- Marios Iliopoulos – guitar solo (track 2)
- Nils-Arne Holmlid – intro speech (track 1)

=== Production ===
- Patrik J. – engineering, mixing
- Henrik Udd – engineering
- Fredrik Nordström – mixing
- Peter In de Betou – mastering
- Niklas Sundin – cover art
- Olle Carlsson – photography
