= Redemption (Redemption album) =

Studio album by Redemption
- Released: March 18, 2003
- Genre: Progressive metal
- Length: 68:13
- Label: Sensory Records
- Producers: Nick van Dyk, Ray Alder

Redemption chronology
Redemption (2003)	The Fullness of Time (2005)

Redemption is the debut album by the American progressive metal band of the same name. It was formed around the friendships and compositions of guitarist/keyboardist Nicholas van Dyk, joined by well-known musicians of the genre from bands like Steel Prophet, Agent Steel, Symphony X, and Fates Warning. The first four tracks are taken from Stephen King's novel Desperation.

== Track listing ==
All songs written by Nick Van Dyk, except where noted.

No.	Title	Length
1.	"Desperation, Part I"	5:56
2.	"Desperation, Part II"	4:32
3.	"Desperation, Part III"	5:43
4.	"Desperation, Part IV"	5:08
5.	"Nocturnal" (Van Dyk, Chris Roy, Bernie Versailles)	3:51
6.	"Window to Space"	13:26
7.	"As I Lay Dying"	5:08
8.	"Something Wicked This Way Comes": I. "Arrivals"; II. "Torments"; III. "The Carnival"; IV. "Pursuits"; V. "The Autumn People"; VI. "Temptations"; VII. "Confrontations"; VIII. "Departures"	24:29
Total length:		68:13

=== Import bonus tracks ===
No.	Title	Length
9.	"The Sound And The Fury"	6:25
Total length:		74:38

== Personnel ==
- Rick Mythiasin - vocals
- Bernie Versailles - guitars
- Nick Van Dyk - guitars, bass, keyboards
- Jason Rullo - drums

=== Guest musicians ===
- Michael Romeo - keyboards, orchestrations (1-4)
- Ray Alder - vocals (2)
- Mark Zonder - drums (7)
