= This Mortal Coil (album) =

Studio album by Redemption
- Released: October 11th, 2011
- Recorded: 2011
- Genre: Progressive metal
- Length: 71:50
- Label: InsideOut Music
- Producer: Neil Kernon

Redemption chronology
Snowfall on Judgment Day (2009)	This Mortal Coil (2011)	The Art of Loss (2016)

This Mortal Coil is the fifth studio release of the progressive metal band Redemption. The album was officially released on October 11, 2011. The inspiration for the album came from guitarist/keyboardist Nick van Dyk being diagnosed with cancer and told he had 3–5 years to live, only to later have that diagnosis overturned and be declared cancer-free. The album comes in both a single-disc standard edition and a two-disc deluxe edition, with the latter including a bonus disc of cover songs billed as "A Collection Of Songs Originally Recorded By Other Artists That One Would Not Expect Would Be Performed By A Progressive Metal Band, Part the First".

== Track listing ==
All tracks are written by Nick van Dyk, except where noted.

This Mortal Coil
No.	Title	Length
1.	"Path of the Whirlwind"	5:26
2.	"Blink of an Eye"	5:57
3.	"No Tickets to the Funeral"	6:26
4.	"Dreams from the Pit"	9:12
5.	"Noonday Devil"	5:04
6.	"Let It Rain (Nick van Dyk, Chris Quirarte)"	7:22
7.	"Focus"	5:43
8.	"Perfect"	4:49
9.	"Begin Again"	6:12
10.	"Stronger Than Death"	5:29
11.	"Departure of the Pale Horse (Nick van Dyk, Sean Andrews)"	10:15
Total length:		71:50

Limited edition bonus disc
No.	Title	Length
1.	"Funeral for a Friend/Love Lies Bleeding" (Elton John cover)	10:32
2.	"Jane" (Jefferson Starship cover)	4:04
3.	"Hold the Line" (Toto cover)	3:40
4.	"Edge of the Blade" (Journey cover)	4:36
5.	"Love To Love" (UFO cover)	7:02
6.	"Precious Things" (Tori Amos cover)	7:24
Total length:		37:18

== Personnel ==
=== Band members ===
- Ray Alder - vocals (except on Precious Things)
- Nick van Dyk - guitars, keyboards
- Bernie Versailles - guitars
- Sean Andrews - bass
- Chris Quirarte - drums

=== Guest musicians ===
- Gary Wehrkamp - keyboard solos on Begin Again
- Anna Kristina - vocals on Precious Things

=== Production ===
- Drums recorded and album mixed by Neil Kernon
- All music written by Redemption
- All lyrics by Nick van Dyk
- Artwork by Travis Smith
