= The Storm Within (Evergrey album) =

Studio album by Evergrey
- Released: 9 September 2016
- Recorded: 2015–2016
- Studios: Top Floor Studios, Gothenburg, Sweden
- Genres: Progressive metal, power metal
- Length: 58:23
- Label: AFM
- Producers: Tom S. Englund, Jonas Ekdahl

Evergrey chronology
Hymns for the Broken (2014)	The Storm Within (2016)	The Atlantic (2019)

Professional ratings
Review scores
Source	Rating
Metal Hammer	5/7 stars
Rock Hard	8.5/10 stars
Metal.de	9/10 stars
Powermetal.de	8/10 stars
Soundi	5/5 stars
Inferno.fi	3.5/5 stars
Vampster	
Loudwire	

The Storm Within is the tenth studio album by Swedish progressive metal band Evergrey.

== Track listing ==
No.	Title	Lyrics	Length
1.	"Distance"	Tom S. Englund	5:38
2.	"Passing Through"	Englund	5:02
3.	"Someday"	Englund	4:59
4.	"Astray"	Englund	5:22
5.	"The Impossible"	Englund	3:19
6.	"My Allied Ocean"	Englund	4:07
7.	"In Orbit" (featuring Floor Jansen)	Englund	5:38
8.	"The Lonely Monarch"	Englund	5:28
9.	"The Paradox of the Flame" (featuring Carina Englund)	Englund	5:40
10.	"Disconnect" (featuring Floor Jansen)	Englund	7:00
11.	"The Storm Within"	Englund	6:16

Limited edition
No.	Title	Music	Length
12.	"Paranoid" (Black Sabbath cover)	Bill Ward, Tony Iommi, Ozzy Osbourne, Geezer Butler	4:41

== Charts ==
Chart (2016)	Peak position
Belgian Albums (Ultratop Flanders)	130
Belgian Albums (Ultratop Wallonia)	84
Finnish Albums (Suomen virallinen lista)	48
German Albums (Offizielle Top 100)	39
Swedish Albums (Sverigetopplistan)	29
Swiss Albums (Schweizer Hitparade)	32
