= Torn (Evergrey album) =

Studio album by Evergrey
- Released: 19 September 2008
- Recorded: September–December 2007
- Studio: Division One Studios
- Genre: Progressive metal, power metal
- Length: 53:30
- Label: Steamhammer/SPV
- Producer: Tom S. Englund and Jonas Ekdahl

Evergrey chronology
Monday Morning Apocalypse (2006)	Torn (2008)	Glorious Collision (2011)

Professional ratings
Review scores
Source	Rating
Allmusic	3.5/5 stars
Metal.de	8/10 stars
Metal Express Radio	9/10 stars
Dead Rhetoric	7.5/10 stars
Heavymetal.dk	5/10 stars
Soundi	4/5 stars
Metal Hammer Germany	
Powermetal.de	

Torn is the seventh studio album by Swedish progressive metal band Evergrey and their first album on SPV sublabel Steamhammer, released on September 2008.

The album debuted at No. 4 on the Swedish charts.

== Track listing ==
All lyrics are written by Tom S. Englund.

No.	Title	Music	Length
1.	"Broken Wings"	Tom S. Englund, Jonas Ekdahl	4:42
2.	"Soaked"	Ekdahl, Englund	4:58
3.	"Fear"	Henrik Danhage	4:15
4.	"When Kingdoms Fall"	Ekdahl, Englund	5:32
5.	"In Confidence"	Englund, Ekdahl	4:03
6.	"Fail"	Englund	4:50
7.	"Numb"	Englund, Rikard Zander	5:17
8.	"Torn"	Englund, Danhage	4:43
9.	"Nothing Is Erased"	Englund, Danhage	4:40
10.	"Still Walk Alone"	Danhage	4:43
11.	"These Scars"	Englund, Ekdahl	5:51

Limited edition
No.	Title	Length
12.	"Caught in a Lie"	5:46

== Personnel ==
Evergrey

- Tom S. Englund - vocals, guitar
- Henrik Danhage - guitar
- Jari Kainulainen - bass
- Rikard Zander - keyboards
- Jonas Ekdahl - drums

Additional musicians

- Carina Englund - female vocals on "Broken Wings" and "These Scars"

== Charts ==
Album

Year	Chart	Position
2008	Sweden (SVG)	4
2008	France (SNEP)	185
