= Raccomandata con Ricevuta di Ritorno =

- Origin: Rome, Italy
- Genres: Progressive rock
- Years active: 1971–1973; 2009 -
- Label: Fonit Cetra
- Members: Luciano Regoli (vocals); Nanni Civitenga (guitar); Damaso Grassi (flute, sax); Stefano Piermaroli (keyboards); Froggio Francica (drums); Manlio Zacchia (bass)

Raccomandata con Ricevuta di Ritorno (also known as Raccomandata Ricevuta Ritorno or RRR), are an Italian progressive rock band.

== Career ==
The band was formed in Rome in 1971 by vocalist Luciano Regoli, guitarist Nanni Civitenga and Drummer Froggio Francica. They released only one LP, the concept album Per... Un Mondo di Cristallo (1973). The album tells the story of an astronaut who on returning home finds life on Earth to be extinct. The band spent two years secluded in a monastery of an undisclosed religion perfecting the lyrics and the music.

Following the dissolution of the band in 1973, Regoli and Civitenga went on to form Samadhi in 1974. Civitenga also worked with the hard rock band Crystals, which included members of Banco del Mutuo Soccorso, Area and Alphataurus. Francica joined bands such as Procession in 1974 and Kaleidon. Later Regoli became a painter, and fronted the band DGM.

=== Comeback ===
In 2010, after a 37-year hiatus, the band reunited and released the album Il pittore volante under the name Nuova Raccomandata con ricevuta di ritorno. The booklet featured some of Regoli's paintings. The band played a concert with Thijs van Leer in 2010. Several live tracks from the gig would later appear on the album Prog Exhibition: 40 anni di musica immaginifica, including an extended version of "Il palco di marionette" from Per... un mondo di cristallo.

== Discography ==
- (1972) Per... un mondo di cristallo
- (2010) Il pittore volante
