= Snowfall on Judgment Day =

Studio album by Redemption
- Released: October 6, 2009
- Recorded: 2009
- Genre: Progressive metal
- Length: 70:24
- Label: InsideOut Music
- Producer: Tommy Hansen

Redemption chronology
The Origins of Ruin (2007)	Snowfall on Judgment Day (2009)	This Mortal Coil (2011)

Professional ratings
Review scores
Source	Rating
AllMusic	3.5/5 stars

Snowfall on Judgment Day is the fourth studio release of the progressive metal band Redemption. Though the official American release date was October 6, 2009, the album was sold almost a month early exclusively at the 10th Annual Prog Power festival in Atlanta, Georgia (September 11–12). This is the only studio album with Greg Hosharian on the keyboards.

== Track listing ==
All songs written by Nick Van Dyk.

No.	Title	Length
1.	"Peel"	6:31
2.	"Walls"	6:46
3.	"Leviathan Rising"	6:41
4.	"Black and White World"	8:03
5.	"Unformed"	6:29
6.	"Keep Breathing"	7:36
7.	"Another Day Dies"	5:14
8.	"What Will You Say"	5:20
9.	"Fistful of Sand"	6:35
10.	"Love Kills Us All / Life in One Day"	10:59
Total length:		70:24

== Personnel ==
=== Band members ===
- Ray Alder - vocals
- Sean Andrews - bass
- Bernie Versailles - guitars
- Nick van Dyk - guitars, keyboards
- Greg Hosharian - keyboards
- Chris Quirarte - drums

=== Guest musicians ===
- James LaBrie - vocals on Another Day Dies
