= The Fullness of Time =

Studio album by Redemption
- Released: June 21, 2005
- Genre: Progressive metal
- Length: 57:25
- Label: Sensory Recordings
- Producer: Tommy Newton

Redemption chronology
Redemption (2003)	The Fullness of Time (2005)	The Origins of Ruin (2007)

The Fullness of Time is progressive metal band Redemption's second album overall, but the first to feature a band lineup, as opposed to a project lineup as found on the 2003 eponymous debut and featuring James Sherwood and Chris Quirarte of Prymary on bass guitar and drums, respectively. The vocals were provided by Fates Warning singer Ray Alder, who previously produced the first album and provided vocals for one song. This is the only album with Sherwood on the bass.

== Reception ==
The album generally received positive reviews from magazines and webzines. Writing for Blabbermouth, Scott Alisoglu also praised the album and commented that the 16-minute track "Sapphire" was the standout piece of the album. Metal Storm's review was also complimentary calling it a "masterpiece."

== Track listing ==
All songs written by Nick Van Dyk.

No.	Title	Length
1.	"Threads"	5:43
2.	"Parker's Eyes"	6:15
3.	"Scarred"	7:56
4.	"Sapphire"	15:55
5.	"The Fullness of Time": I. "Rage"; II. "Despair"; III. "Release"; IV. "Transcendence"	21:36 5:01 3:20 5:16 7:59
Total length:		57:25

=== Import bonus tracks ===
No.	Title	Length
6.	"The Real Thing" (Faith No More cover)	8:14
Total length:		65:39

== Personnel ==
- Ray Alder - vocals
- Nick van Dyk - guitars, keyboards
- Bernie Versailles - guitars
- James Sherwood - bass
- Chris Quirarte - drums
