= The Passage (DGM album) =

Studio album by DGM
- Released: August 26, 2016
- Venue: San Marino
- Studio: Domination Studio, San Marino
- Genre: Progressive metal, power metal
- Length: 60:01, 64:03 (Japanese version)
- Label: Frontiers
- Producer: Simone Mularoni

DGM chronology
| Momentum (2013) | The Passage (2016) | Tragic Separation (2020) |

Singles from The Passage
- 1. "Animal" Released: June 13, 2016; 2. "Fallen" Released: August 15, 2016

The Passage is the ninth full-length studio album by Italian progressive metal band DGM. This is the third album with this line-up and it was released on August 26, 2016, by Italian label Frontiers Records. The album was produced by band guitarist Simone Mularoni.

On June 13, "Animal" was released as its first single and on August 15 "Fallen" was released.

== Track listing ==
All music written by Mark Basile and Simone Mularoni. All lyrics written by Basile, Mularoni, Andrea Arcangeli, Fabio Costantino and Luigi Sanese.

| No. | Title | Length |
|---|---|---|
| 1. | "The Secret (Part I)" (additional orchestration by Andrea Anastasi) | 8:24 |
| 2. | "The Secret (Part II)" | 7:16 |
| 3. | "Animal" | 5:19 |
| 4. | "Ghosts of Insanity" (featuring Tom Englund) | 5:35 |
| 5. | "Fallen" | 5:40 |
| 6. | "The Passage" | 5:11 |
| 7. | "Disguise" | 1:54 |
| 8. | "Portrait" | 5:40 |
| 9. | "Daydreamer" | 5:36 |
| 10. | "Dogma" (featuring Michael Romeo) | 5:45 |
| 11. | "In Sorrow" | 3:41 |
| Total length: | | 60:01 |

Japanese version bonus track
| No. | Title | Length |
|---|---|---|
| 12. | "Animal" (Acoustic version) | 4:02 |

== Personnel ==
- Mark Basile – lead vocals
- Simone Mularoni – guitars
- Andrea Arcangeli – bass
- Fabio Costantino – drums
- Emanuele Casali – keyboards

=== Additional personnel ===
- Tom Englund – guest vocals on Ghosts of Insanity
- Michael Romeo – guest guitar solo on Dogma
- Andrea Anastasi – additional orchestration on The Secret (Part I)
