= Glorious Collision =

Studio album by Evergrey
- Released: 22 February 2011
- Recorded: March–October 2010
- Studio: Division Sun Studios; Damage Done Studios; Surroundworks Studios
- Genre: Progressive metal, heavy metal
- Length: 57:53
- Label: SPV
- Producer: Tom S. Englund

Evergrey chronology
Torn (2008)	Glorious Collision (2011)	Hymns for the Broken (2014)

Professional ratings
Review scores
Source	Rating
Heavymetal.dk	6/10 stars
Metal Express Radio	9/10
Metal Injection	7.5/10
Metal Storm	7.5/10
Metal.de	8/10
Powermetal.de	9/10
Rock Hard	8.5/10

Glorious Collision is the eighth studio album by Swedish progressive metal band Evergrey, released on 22 February 2011 via SPV. It was the first Evergrey album to feature bassist Johan Niemann, and the only album to have guitarist Marcus Jidell (later with Avatarium) and drummer Hannes Van Dahl (who left for Sabaton). A music video was released for "Wrong", followed by "Leave It Behind".

== Track listing ==
No.	Title	Lyrics	Music	Length
1.	"Leave It Behind Us"	Tom Englund	Englund/Rikard Zander	5:09
2.	"You"	Englund	Marcus Jidell/Englund	6:23
3.	"Wrong"	Englund/Zander	Zander/Englund	5:14
4.	"Frozen"	Englund	Zander/Englund	5:01
5.	"Restoring the Loss"	Englund	Englund	4:46
6.	"To Fit the Mold"	Englund	Englund/Jidell	5:24
7.	"Out of Reach"	Englund	Zander/Englund	3:43
8.	"The Phantom Letters"	Englund	Englund	5:31
9.	"The Disease..."	Englund	Englund	4:13
10.	"It Comes from Within"	Englund	Englund	4:25
11.	"Free"	Englund	Zander/Englund	3:45
12.	"I'm Drowning Alone"	Englund	Zander/Englund	4:17
13.	"...And the Distance"	Englund	Englund/Zander	3:47

Limited edition digipak
No.	Title	Lyrics	Music	Length
14.	"...And the Distance" (feat. Carina Englund)	Englund	Englund/Zander	3:47

== Personnel ==
=== Band ===
- Tom Englund - vocals, guitar
- Rikard Zander - keyboards
- Marcus Jidell - guitar
- Johan Niemann - bass
- Hannes Van Dahl - drums

=== Guest musicians ===
- Carina Englund - female vocals
- Salina Englund (Tom Englund's daughter) - guest vocals on "I'm Drowning Alone"

== Charts ==
Album

Year	Chart	Position
2011	Sweden (SVG)	8
