= Holy War (Dragonland album) =

Studio album by Dragonland
- Released: 29 June 2002
- Recorded: December 2001–January 2002
- Studios: Studio Fredman, Gothenburg, Sweden
- Genres: Power metal, symphonic metal
- Length: 56:11
- Label: Black Lotus
- Producers: Patrik J., Fredrik Nordström of Dream Evil

Dragonland chronology
The Battle of the Ivory Plains (2001)	Holy War (2002)	Starfall (2004)

Professional ratings
Review scores
Source	Rating
Imperiumi	9/10
Metalitalia.com	6/10
Powermetal.de	Unfavourable
Rock Hard	6.5/10
Vampster	Unfavourable

Holy War is the second album released by the power metal band Dragonland, set in the fictional world of Dragonland.

== Track listing ==
All music written by Dragonland unless otherwise noted

1. "Hundred Years Have Passed" – 2:24
2. "Majesty of the Mithril Mountains" – 5:29
3. "Through Elven Woods and Dwarven Mines" – 5:32
4. "Holy War" – 6:48
5. "Calm Before the Storm" – 4:53
6. "The Return to the Ivory Plains" – 6:05
7. "Forever Walking Alone" – 4:55
8. "Blazing Hate" – 5:25
9. "A Thousand Points of Light" – 6:02
10. "One With All" – 4:24
- Japanese Bonus Tracks:

11. "The Neverending Story" (Limahl Cover) – 3:03
12. "Allemande" (Johann Sebastian Bach) – 1:06
13. "So Many Questions" - 3:40

== Personnel ==
- Jonas Heidgert - vocals, drums
- Nicklas Magnusson - guitars
- Olof Mörck - guitars
- Elias Holmlid - keyboards, synthesizers
- Christer Pedersen - bass
- Mixed and Engineered by: Patrik J., Fredrik Nordström of Dream Evil
- Mastered at: Athens Mastering House
- Cover Art by: Chrille Andersson
- Band Photos by: Tanja Backhaus
