= The Origins of Ruin =

Studio album by Redemption
- Released: April 3, 2007
- Recorded: May–September 2006
- Studios: Bill's Place Studios, North Hollywood, California; Linda Flora Studios, Los Angeles, California
- Genre: Progressive metal
- Length: 57:13
- Label: Inside Out Music
- Producer: Tommy Newton

Redemption chronology
The Fullness of Time (2005)	The Origins of Ruin (2007)	Snowfall on Judgment Day (2009)

Professional ratings
Review scores
Source	Rating
Metal Express Radio	5/10
Metal Injection	7.5/10
Metal Storm	8.8/10
RevelationZ Magazine	8.5/10; 8/10

The Origins of Ruin is the third album by American progressive metal band Redemption. It is the first to feature Sean Andrews on bass.

== Track listing ==
All songs written by Nick Van Dyk.

No.	Title	Length
1.	"The Suffocating Silence"	6:37
2.	"Bleed Me Dry"	6:55
3.	"The Death of Faith and Reason"	4:56
4.	"Memory"	9:30
5.	"The Origins of Ruin"	2:47
6.	"Man of Glass"	5:01
7.	"Blind My Eyes"	5:55
8.	"Used to Be"	6:08
9.	"Fall on You"	9:24
Total length:		57:13

=== Japanese edition bonus track ===
No.	Title	Length
10.	"Precious Things" (Tori Amos cover)	7:23
Total length:		64:36

== Personnel ==
- Ray Alder - vocals
- Nick van Dyk - guitars, keyboards
- Bernie Versailles - guitars
- Sean Andrews - bass
- Chris Quirarte - drums
