= The Dark Discovery =

Studio album by Evergrey
- Released: 16 March 1998
- Recorded: June–October 1996
- Studios: Los Angered Recordings, Gothenburg, Sweden
- Genres: Progressive metal, power metal
- Length: 47:47
- Label: GNW
- Producers: Andy La Rocque and Evergrey

Evergrey chronology
The Dark Discovery (1998)	Solitude, Dominance, Tragedy (1999)

Professional ratings
Review scores
Source	Rating
Metal Curse	9.75/10
Scream Magazine	5/6
Soundi	4/5 stars

The Dark Discovery is the debut studio album by Swedish progressive metal band Evergrey. It was recorded in 1996, but not released until 1998. This album and the band's second album Solitude, Dominance, Tragedy were re-released together in 2017.

== Track listing ==
All lyrics are written by Tom S. Englund except where noted; all music is composed by Evergrey.

No.	Title	Length
1.	"Blackened Dawn"	3:52
2.	"December 26th"	5:05
3.	"Dark Discovery"	3:35
4.	"As Light Is Our Darkness" (lyrics: Daniel Nojd, Englund)	2:00
5.	"Beyond Salvation"	4:03
6.	"Closed Eyes"	6:39
7.	"Trust and Betrayal"	4:18
8.	"Shadowed"	3:52
9.	"When the River Calls"	4:28
10.	"For Every Tear That Falls"	4:14
11.	"To Hope Is to Fear"	5:41
Total length:		47:47

2004 special edition
No.	Title	Length
12.	"For Every Tear That Falls" (bonus video)	4:13
Total length:		52:00

== Performers ==
Band:

- Tom S. Englund - vocals, guitar
- Dan Bronell - guitar
- Daniel Nojd - bass
- Patrick Carlsson - drums
- Will Chandra - keyboards

Guests:

- Carina Kjellberg - all female vocals
- Andy LaRocque - guest guitar on "Closed Eyes"
- Mattias IA Eklundh - guest guitar on "When the River Calls"
