= Hymns for the Broken =

Studio album by Evergrey
- Released: 26 September 2014
- Recorded: November 2013 – August 2014
- Studio: Gung Studios; Division Two Studios; Sound Industry Studios
- Genre: Progressive metal, power metal
- Length: 61:13
- Label: AFM
- Producer: Tom S. Englund, Jacob Hansen

Evergrey chronology
Glorious Collision (2011)	Hymns for the Broken (2014)	The Storm Within (2016)

Professional ratings
Review scores
Source	Rating
Heavymetal.dk	6/10 stars
Louder Sound	4/5 stars
Metal Hammer	5/7
Metal Storm	8/10
Metal.de	9/10
Powermetal.de	9/10
Rock Hard	8.5/10

Hymns for the Broken is the ninth studio album by Swedish progressive metal band Evergrey. A music video was released for "King of Errors", followed shortly by "The Grand Collapse".

== Track listing ==
All lyrics are written by Tom S. Englund.

No.	Title	Length
1.	"The Awakening"	1:42
2.	"King of Errors"	5:42
3.	"A New Dawn"	4:37
4.	"Wake a Change"	4:50
5.	"Archaic Rage"	6:28
6.	"Barricades"	4:59
7.	"Black Undertow"	5:03
8.	"The Fire"	4:12
9.	"Hymns for the Broken"	4:58
10.	"Missing You"	3:27
11.	"The Grand Collapse"	7:48
12.	"The Aftermath"	7:27

Limited edition bonus disc
No.	Title	Length
1.	"Hymns for the Broken" (Piano version)	4:40
2.	"Barricades" (Piano version)	3:52
3.	"These Scars" (Piano version)	4:55

== Chart positions ==
Chart (2014)	Peak position
Finnish Albums Chart	24
German Albums (Offizielle Top 100)	62
Swedish Albums Chart	43
