= Monday Morning Apocalypse =

Studio album by Evergrey
- Released: 24 March 2006
- Recorded: 2005
- Studio: Division One Studios
- Genre: Progressive metal, power metal
- Length: 41:32
- Label: InsideOut
- Producer: Sanken Sandquist and Evergrey

Evergrey chronology
The Inner Circle (2004)	Monday Morning Apocalypse (2006)	Torn (2008)

Professional ratings
Review scores
Source	Rating
Heavymetal.dk	9/10 stars
Metal Storm	8/10
Metal.de	8/10
Soundi.fi	3/5 stars

Monday Morning Apocalypse is the sixth studio album by Swedish progressive metal band Evergrey. It was released on 24 March 2006 (Europe) and 4 April 2006 (United States). It was the final Evergrey album to feature bassist Michael Håkansson who was temporarily replaced by Fredrik Larsson (ex-HammerFall). The album has received mixed-to-positive feedback from reviewers.

== Track listing ==
No.	Title	Lyrics	Music	Length
1.	"Monday Morning Apocalypse"	Tom S. Englund	Henrik Danhage, Englund	3:10
2.	"Unspeakable"	Englund	Englund	3:54
3.	"Lost"	Englund	Danhage, Englund	3:13
4.	"Obedience"	Englund	Jonas Ekdahl, Englund, Danhage	4:13
5.	"The Curtain Fall"	Englund	Englund	3:09
6.	"In Remembrance"	Rikard Zander, Englund	Zander, Englund	3:33
7.	"At Loss for Words"	Englund	Englund	4:13
8.	"Till Dagmar"		Zander	1:40
9.	"Still in the Water"	Englund	Danhage	5:17
10.	"The Dark I Walk You Through"	Englund	Danhage, Englund	4:19
11.	"I Should"	Englund	Englund	4:51
12.	"Closure" (bonus track)	Englund	Ekdahl	3:08

== Personnel ==
=== Evergrey ===
- Tom S. Englund - vocals, guitar
- Henrik Danhage - guitar
- Michael Håkansson - bass
- Rikard Zander - keyboards
- Jonas Ekdahl - drums

=== Guest musicians ===
- Carina Englund - female vocals
- Sigvard Järrebring - string arrangement on "In Remembrance"

== Charts ==
Chart (2006)	Peak position
Sweden (SVG)	6
