= Under the Grey Banner =

Studio album by Dragonland
- Released: 15 November 2011
- Recorded: April 2010–March 2011
- Studio: Hansen Studios
- Genres: Power metal, symphonic metal
- Length: 55:52; 53:36 (Japanese edition)
- Label: AFM Records

Dragonland chronology
Astronomy (2006)	Under the Grey Banner (2011)	The Power of the Nightstar (2022)

Professional ratings
Review scores
Source	Rating
Imperiumi	8+/10
Metal.de	9/10
Metalitalia.com	7/10
Metal Temple	8/10
Rock Hard	7/10

Under the Grey Banner is the fifth studio album by Swedish power metal band Dragonland. Released on 13 November 2011, it is the third part of the Dragonland Chronicles saga. Damian Bajowski (known from PC game The Witcher) created the cover artwork for this chapter of the saga.

== Track listing ==
No.	Title	Writer(s)	Length
1.	"Ilmarion"	Olof Mörck	3:18
2.	"Shadow of the Mithril Mountains" (feat. Anna Mariann Lundberg)	Elias Holmlid/Mörck	5:44
3.	"The Tempest"	Holmlid/Mörck	4:12
4.	"A Thousand Towers White"	Mörck	4:07
5.	"Fire and Brimstone" (feat. Fred Johanson)	Holmlid/Mörck	4:31
6.	"The Black Mare"	Holmlid/Mörck	6:13
7.	"Lady of Goldenwood" (feat. Elize Ryd, Anna Mariann Lundberg)	Mörck	4:16
8.	"Dûrnir's Forge" (feat. Fred Johanson)	Mörck	4:58
9.	"The Trials of Mount Farnor"	Holmlid/Mörck	5:26
10.	"Throne of Bones" (feat. Fred Johanson)	Mörck	1:46
11.	"Under the Grey Banner" (feat. Andy Solveström, Fred Johanson, Jake E, Elize Ryd, Anna Marianne Lundberg)	Holmlid/Mörck	8:04
12.	"Ivory Shores" (feat. Anna Marianne Lundberg)	Mörck	3:17
Total length:			55:52

Japanese edition bonus track
No.	Title	Writer(s)	Length
6.	"At the Inn of Éamon Bayle"	Mörck	3:57
Total length:			59:49

== Personnel ==
Dragonland

- Olof Mörck – guitars, violin
- Jonas Heidgert – vocals
- Anders Hammer – bass
- Elias Holmlid – keyboards
- Jesse Lindskog – guitars
- Morten Løwe Sørensen – drums

Additional musicians

- Fred Johanson
- Anna Mariann Lundberg
- Elize Ryd
- Jake E. Lundberg
- Andy Solveström
