= Solitude, Dominance, Tragedy =

Solitude · Dominance · Tragedy

Studio album by Evergrey
- Released: 17 May 1999
- Recorded: February–April 1999
- Studio: Los Angered Recordings (Gothenburg, Sweden)
- Genre: Progressive metal; power metal
- Length: 43:15
- Label: Gothenburg Noiseworks
- Producer: Andy LaRocque; Evergrey

Evergrey chronology
The Dark Discovery (1998)	Solitude · Dominance · Tragedy (1999)	In Search of Truth (2001)

Professional ratings
Review scores
Source	Rating
Metal Crypt	3/5
Metal.de	7/10
MetalReviews	90/100
Metal-Temple	10/10
RockHard	8.5/10

Solitude, Dominance, Tragedy is the second studio album by Swedish progressive metal band Evergrey. It was released on 17 May 1999 through Gothenburg Noiseworks/Hall of Sermon. It was re-issued and re-released in 2004 via Inside Out Music, and in 2017 via AFM Records. Recording sessions took place at Los Angered Recordings in Gothenburg from February to April 1999. Production was handled by Andy LaRocque and Evergrey themselves. It is the last album to feature original bassist Daniel Nojd and guitarist Dan Bronell.

== Track listing ==
All lyrics are written by Tom S. Englund except tracks 4-6 written with Daniel Nojd, Dan Bronell and Patrick Carlsson; all music is composed by Evergrey

No.	Title	Length
1.	"Solitude Within"	5:32
2.	"Nosferatu"	5:39
3.	"The Shocking Truth"	4:34
4.	"A Scattered Me"	4:16
5.	"She Speaks to the Dead"	4:57
6.	"When Darkness Falls"	4:50
7.	"Words Mean Nothing"	4:11
8.	"Damnation"	3:50
9.	"The Corey Curse"	5:21

2004 special edition
No.	Title	Length
10.	"The Masterplan" (bonus video)	4:45

== Personnel ==
Evergrey

- Tom S. Englund – vocals, guitars, lyrics, keyboards arrangement, producer
- Daniel Nojd – backing vocals, bass, lyrics (tracks: 4–6), keyboards arrangement, producer
- Dan Bronell – guitars, lyrics (tracks: 4–6), keyboards arrangement, producer
- Patrick Carlsson – drums, lyrics (tracks: 4–6), keyboards arrangement, producer

Additional credits

- Carina Kjellberg – female vocals, choir arrangement
- The Mercury Choir – choir
- Erik Ask – harp
- Stuart Wyatt – six-string violin
- Zachary Stephens – keyboards
- Anders Allhage – mixing, engineering, producer
- Kristian "Rizza" Isaksson – additional technician
- Kristian Wåhlin – cover
- Samuel Durling – cover
- Kenneth Johansson – photography
