= DGM (band) =

Italian progressive power metal band

- Origin: Italy
- Genres: Progressive metal, power metal
- Years active: 1994−present
- Label: Scarlet
- Members: Mark Basile; Simone Mularoni; Emanuele Casali; Andrea Arcangeli; Fabio Costantino
- Past members: Maurizio Pariotti; Gianfranco Tassella; Marco Marchiori; Luciano Regoli; Diego Reali; Fabio Sanges; Titta Tani
- Website: www.dgmsite.com

DGM ("Diego, Gianfranco and Maurizio", after the founding members) is an Italian progressive metal band. The band has undergone numerous lineup changes throughout its history, and none of the original members remain in the current formation. Since 1994, eight former members have departed the group.

== Career ==
=== Early career (1994–2000) ===
Originally formed in 1994 as an all-instrumental, power metal outfit, Italy's DGM featured guitarist Diego Reali, keyboardist Maurizio Pariotti and drummer Gianfranco Tassella.

In 1995 Luciano Regoli, formerly of Raccomandata Ricevuta Ritorno, soon joined as lead singer. Their first official release was in 1996, the self-produced mini CD Random Access Zone.

In 1997 the band produced their first full-length album Change Direction the album was well received in Italy, Germany, Finland, and Denmark, which prompted them to start an Italian tour which resulted in a gain in popularity.

With the new drummer Fabio Costantino (ex-Carnal Raptor), DGM entered the studio for their second album: Wings of Time (top album on the Italian magazines Metal Shock, Flash and Metal Hammer). In Japan the CD sold over 4,000 copies in the first 10 days. The band was also contacted by Burrn! for an exclusive interview that enlarged DGM's reputation in the worldwide musical scene.

=== Rise in popularity with Titta Tani (2000–2007) ===
Before their third studio album release, Titta Tani joined the band, becoming the new DGM singer. Dreamland was subsequently released in December 2001. In springtime 2001, Andrea Arcangeli (Airlines Of Terror, Solisia, Concept, ex-River of Change) became the new DGM bass player just before the Italian dates for Dreamland promotion.

In 2002, the band was signed by Italian independent label Scarlet Records. After the split of former member Maurizio Pariotti, Hidden Place was released in May 2003 with different sound from the new keyboard player Fabio Sanges (Abstracta). The fourth album received excellent reviews on many magazines and web magazines from all over the world. Following the release DGM played at the Gods of Metal in 2003.

Misplaced was released in February 2004. The album was produced by Giuseppe Orlando's Outer Sound studios. Like Hidden Place, Misplaced has been received well by both the magazines and the audience, and several live dates followed the release.

In 2005, Simone Mularoni replaced Diego Reali. Mularoni had previous experience as a sound engineer and producer at the Fear Studios. After his addition, DGM also teamed up with keyboard player Emanuele Casali after the departure of Fabio Sanges. Mularoni and Casali gave the new songs a renewed process of recording and the result of Simone's experience is included in Different Shapes, which was released in 2007.

On the live front, DGM played for the second time at the Gods of Metal (2007) together with Heaven & Hell, Dream Theater, Symphony X, Dark Tranquility among others, Lagoa Burning Festival (2007), Prog-Power Europe (2007) as a confirmation of the high quality of Different Shapes.

=== Mark Basile era (2007–present) ===
In February 2007, DGM announced that Mark Basile was the new singer of the band. He was chosen among several auditions throughout Italy, Europe and America after Titta Tani left the band.

In early 2009, DGM released their first album with Mark Basile and the seventh album of their career: Frame. Although well received, several reviews marked it as a slight step back compared to Different Shapes. It was another four years before DGM released another studio album, the longest gap in their career.

In April 2010, DGM performed a show in Rome to celebrate the band's 15 year anniversary. This was recorded and released in September in the same year as the 2-disc CD/DVD, Synthesis. The DVD disc contained the complete live show including backstage access and a 'Making of' film of the album Frame. The CD is a 'best of' collection, containing songs from throughout the band's career re-recorded and re-arranged with the current line-up. The CD also contained two new songs "Just like Before" and "The Only One".

On 28 March 2013, DGM released their eighth album, Momentum. Their second with Basile and also the first album since 2004's Misplaced to feature an unchanged line-up from their previous studio release. The album featured guest vocals on the track "Reason" from Russell Allen of Symphony X and guest guitars on the track "Chaos" from Jørn Viggo Lofstad of Pagan's Mind.

On 26 August 2016, DGM released their ninth studio album, The Passage. Guitarist and producer Simone Mularoni said; "This album can easily be seen as our most ambitious work to date". This album also featured special guest appearances, Evergrey singer Tom Englund on the track and single "Ghosts of Insanity" and another guest appearance from a member of Symphony X, this time from guitarist Michael Romeo on the track "Dogma".

On August 8, 2020, the single "Flesh and Blood" was released from the tenth studio album Tragic Separation, which itself came out on October 9 via Frontiers Records and was produced by guitarist Simone Mularoni.

On August 28th 2024 DGM released the single "The Great Unknown", from their album "Endless", due on October 18th via Frontier Records. This album will be a progressive rock concept album, bringing a new style to their music.

== Band members ==
Current

- Mark Basile - vocals (2008–present)
- Simone Mularoni - guitar (2006–present)
- Emanuele Casali - keyboards (2006–present)
- Andrea Arcangeli - bass guitar (2003–present)
- Fabio Costantino - drums (1999–present)

Former

- Diego Reali - guitar, bass (1994–2005)
- Gianfranco Tassella - drums (1994–1999)
- Maurizio Pariotti - keyboards (1994–2002)
- Luciano Regoli - vocals (1995–2000)
- Marco Marchiori - bass guitar (1998–2000)
- Ingo Schwartz - bass guitar (1996–1997)
- Titta Tani - vocals (2001–2007)
- Fabio Sanges - keyboards (2003–2005)

== Discography ==
=== Studio albums ===
- 1997 - Change Direction
- 1999 - Wings of Time
- 2001 - Dreamland
- 2003 - Hidden Place
- 2004 - Misplaced
- 2007 - Different Shapes
- 2009 - Frame
- 2013 - Momentum
- 2016 - The Passage
- 2020 - Tragic Separation
- 2023 - Life
- 2024 - Endless

=== Compilation and live albums ===
- 2010 - Synthesis
- 2017 - Passing Stages: Live in Milan and Atlanta
