= The Inner Circle (album) =

Studio album by Evergrey
- Released: 27 April 2004
- Recorded: November 2003 – February 2004
- Studio: Division One Studios
- Genre: Progressive metal, power metal
- Length: 48:15
- Label: InsideOut
- Producer: Tom S. Englund; Henrik Danhage

Evergrey chronology
Recreation Day (2003)	The Inner Circle (2004)	Monday Morning Apocalypse (2006)

Professional ratings
Review scores
Source	Rating
Allmusic	3/5 stars
Heavymetal.dk	8/10 stars

The Inner Circle is the fifth studio album by Swedish progressive metal band Evergrey, released in 2004. The album is a concept album that deals with the themes of religion, cults, and child abuse. According to an interview with frontman Tom S. Englund, the spoken word parts in the album are of an actual person. The last track on the album, "When the Walls Go Down" samples excerpts from David Wilkerson's speech "A Call to Anguish".

== Track listing ==
All lyrics are written by Tom S. Englund.

No.	Title	Music	Length
1.	"A Touch of Blessing"	Tom S. Englund	5:50
2.	"Ambassador"	Englund, Jonas Ekdahl	4:29
3.	"In the Wake of the Weary"	Henrik Danhage	4:43
4.	"Harmless Wishes"	Danhage, Englund, Rikard Zander	4:18
5.	"Waking Up Blind"	Englund	4:22
6.	"More Than Ever"	Danhage	4:13
7.	"The Essence of Conviction"	Englund, Danhage, Ekdahl	6:07
8.	"Where All Good Sleep"	Zander, Englund	4:37
9.	"Faith Restored"	Englund	3:54
10.	"When the Walls Go Down"	Englund, Zander, Danhage, Ekdahl	5:42

Special edition
No.	Title	Length
11.	"I'm Sorry" (Live and acoustic)	3:28
12.	"Recreation Day" (Live and acoustic)	3:33
13.	"Madness Caught Another Victim" (Live and acoustic)	3:09

== Personnel ==
=== Band ===
- Tom S. Englund – vocals and guitar
- Henrik Danhage – guitar
- Michael Håkansson – bass
- Rikard Zander – keyboards
- Jonas Ekdahl – drums

=== Other ===
- Carina Englund – vocals
- Gothenburg Symphony Orchestra – string quartet
