= Evergrey =

Swedish progressive metal band

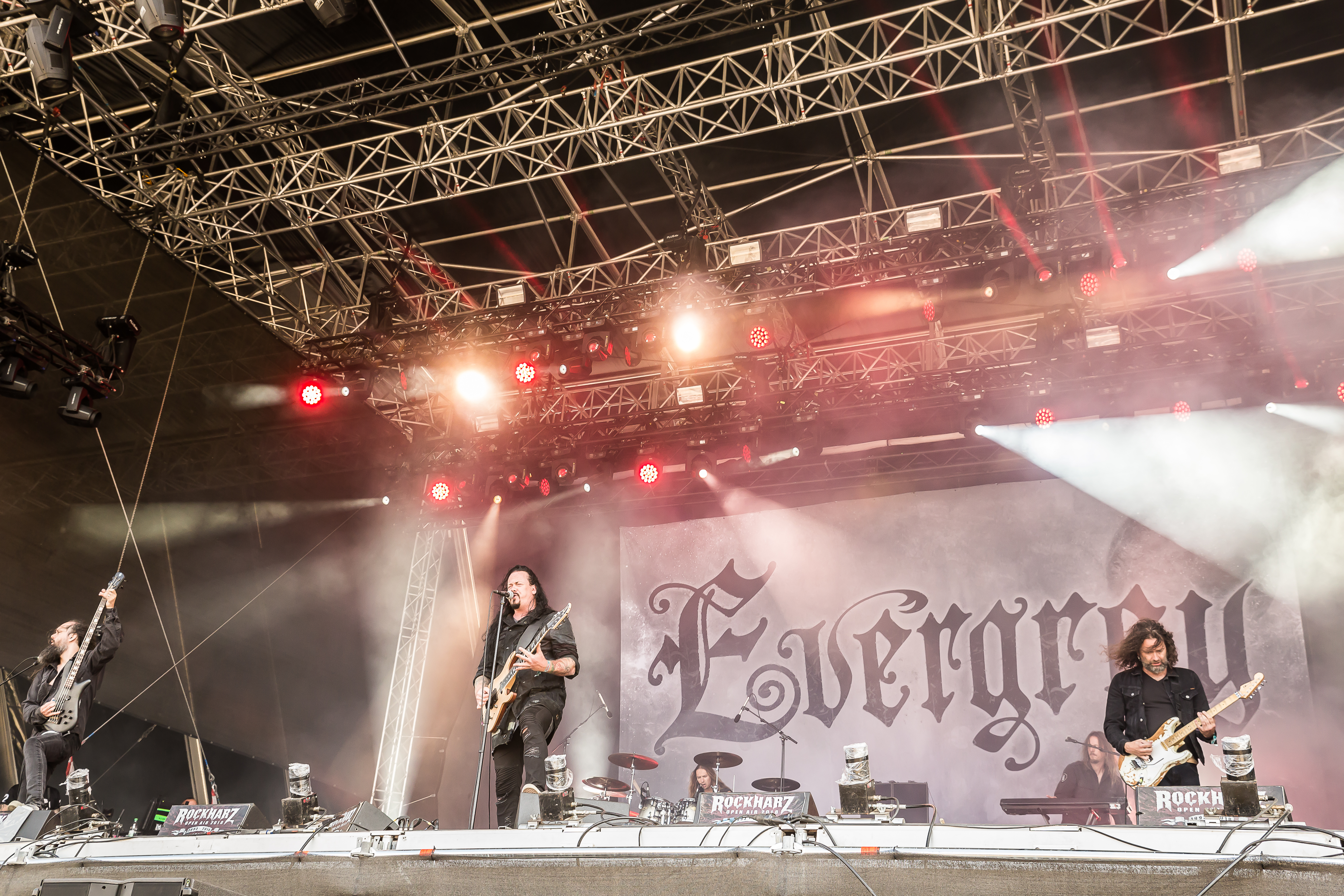
- Evergrey performing at Rockharz 2018

Background information
- Origin: Gothenburg, Sweden
- Genres: Progressive metal, power metal
- Years active: 1993–present
- Labels: Napalm, AFM, Inside Out
- Members: Tom S. Englund; Rikard Zander; Johan Niemann; Simen Sandnes; Stephen Platt
- Past members: Patrick Carlsson; Dan Bronell; Daniel Nöjd; Will Chandra; Sven Karlsson; Michael Håkansson; Henrik Danhage; Christian Rehn; Jonas Ekdahl; Fredrik Larsson; Jari Kainulainen; Marcus Jidell; Hannes Van Dahl
- Website: evergrey.net

Evergrey is a Swedish progressive metal band from Gothenburg, formed in 1993 by guitarist and vocalist Tom S. Englund and guitarist Dan Bronell. The band is known for combining progressive metal and power metal with dark lyrical themes and imagery.

After releasing their debut album, The Dark Discovery, in 1998, Evergrey developed a discography that includes concept albums such as In Search of Truth and Recreation Day, as well as the later conceptual trilogy Hymns for the Broken, The Storm Within, and The Atlantic. Englund has remained the band's central member through numerous lineup changes.

== History ==
Evergrey was formed in 1993 in Gothenburg by guitarist/vocalist Tom S. Englund and guitarist Dan Bronell as a progressive power metal band, in contrast to the melodic death metal that Gothenburg is known for. Since then, the band's lyrics have always been of the darker sort, and the same can be said of the band's imagery. After finding a stable lineup, The Dark Discovery was recorded in 1996 and released in 1998, and Solitude, Dominance, Tragedy was recorded and released in 1999. While those two albums dealt with a variety of ideas, In Search of Truth (2001) and Recreation Day (2003) are concept albums, the latter album dealing with issues such as contemplating suicide ("As I Lie Here Bleeding"), mourners after a funeral ("I'm Sorry", a cover of Dilba Demirbag's hit), and dying people looking back on their "unforgivable" sins ("Unforgivable"). "Unforgivable" also acted as a catalyst for the next album, The Inner Circle (2004), which expanded on the issues described in the song: cults, religion and child abuse.

On 4 April 2006, Evergrey released their sixth studio album, Monday Morning Apocalypse. It debuted at No. 6 in Sweden.

Later that year, Evergrey played at many festivals throughout Europe: among others, Sweden Rock Festival, Download Festival, Arvika Festival, Masters of Rock, Storsjöyran and Sziget Festival. From 5 to 30 May, the band toured the United States with In Flames, Nevermore and Throwdown. On 15 September, they headlined Prog Power VII in Atlanta, Georgia.

On 24 October 2006, Evergrey started a new European tour. They were supported by fellow Swedish death metal band Avatar, and they visited Germany, Italy, Spain, France, the Netherlands, Belgium, the United Kingdom, Denmark, and Sweden.

Evergrey released their seventh studio album, Torn, in September 2008, continuing with their trademark lyrical themes of desperation and despair. Jari Kainulainen permanently filled the role on 6 August 2007, who also played bass on Torn.

On 8 May 2008, Evergrey announced that they had signed a deal with Steamhammer/SPV. This included the release of their new album and the entire back catalogue. It also was announced that the new album, Torn, would be released early in September 2008. As the deal includes the band's entire back catalog, there is the possibility of re-releases of previous Evergrey albums with the inclusion of added bonus material.

In July 2008, Swedish/Danish band Amaranthe announced that keyboardist Rikard Zander, along with In Flames bassist Peter Iwers, would make a guest appearance on their upcoming album.

In May 2010, it was announced that Jonas Ekdahl, Henrik Danhage and Jari Kainulainen have all left Evergrey by mutual decision because of problems with the band members interacting with each other. They called it quits as to not ruin the friendship they all have with each other.

An article posted on 13 November 2010 on Evergrey's blog contained dates for upcoming concerts as well as the confirmation of a new album titled Glorious Collision on 28 February 2011.

Via Facebook posts in November 2013, while writing the next Evergrey album due for release in 2014, the band first confirmed that drummer Hannes Van Dahl would be leaving the band to join Sabaton full-time, and then due to "problems working together" guitarist Marcus Jidell would also be leaving.

In August 2014, the release of the music video for "King of Errors" from the forthcoming Hymns for the Broken revealed that Henrik Danhage and Jonas Ekdahl had returned to the band. Hymns for the Broken was released in September 2014. The band released two more albums after that, The Storm Within in 2016 and The Atlantic in 2019. Those three albums were mixed and mastered by Jacob Hansen and form a conceptual trilogy.

Evergrey's twelfth studio album, Escape of the Phoenix, was released on 26 February 2021. It was elected by Metal Hammer as the 10th best progressive metal album of 2021.

On 26 August 2021 Evergrey announced they signed a new deal with Napalm Records and are already working on a new album.

On 24 February 2022 Evergrey announced the release of their thirteenth studio album, A Heartless Portrait (The Orphéan Testament), which was released on Napalm Records on 20 May 2022.

On 23 October 2023 Evergrey announced the release of From Dark Discoveries To Heartless Portraits, a compilation album to commemorate the 30th anniversary of the band's formation, released on 15 December 2023.

On 12 April 2024 the band released a new single, "Falling from the Sun", coinciding with the announcement of their newest album Theories of Emptiness, which released on 7 June 2024. On 15 May it was announced that drummer Jonas Ekdahl would be stepping down as drummer for the band due to having more interest in production and mixing than drumming. Simen Sandnes (also of Shining) joined as their new drummer.

On 6 November 2025, a new single called "Oxygen" was released. This came after an announcement for a new European tour in 2025, where they would be supporting Katatonia.

On 9 November 2025, the band announced that Henrik Danhage would be taking a break from the band. Stephen Platt (Scar Symmetry & former live guitarist for Devin Townsend) was announced to be filling in his place for all upcoming live shows. On 7 April 2026, it was announced the band had parted ways with Danhage. Two days later, Platt was announced as a full-time member of the band.

== Band members ==
Evergrey at Rockharz Open Air 2018

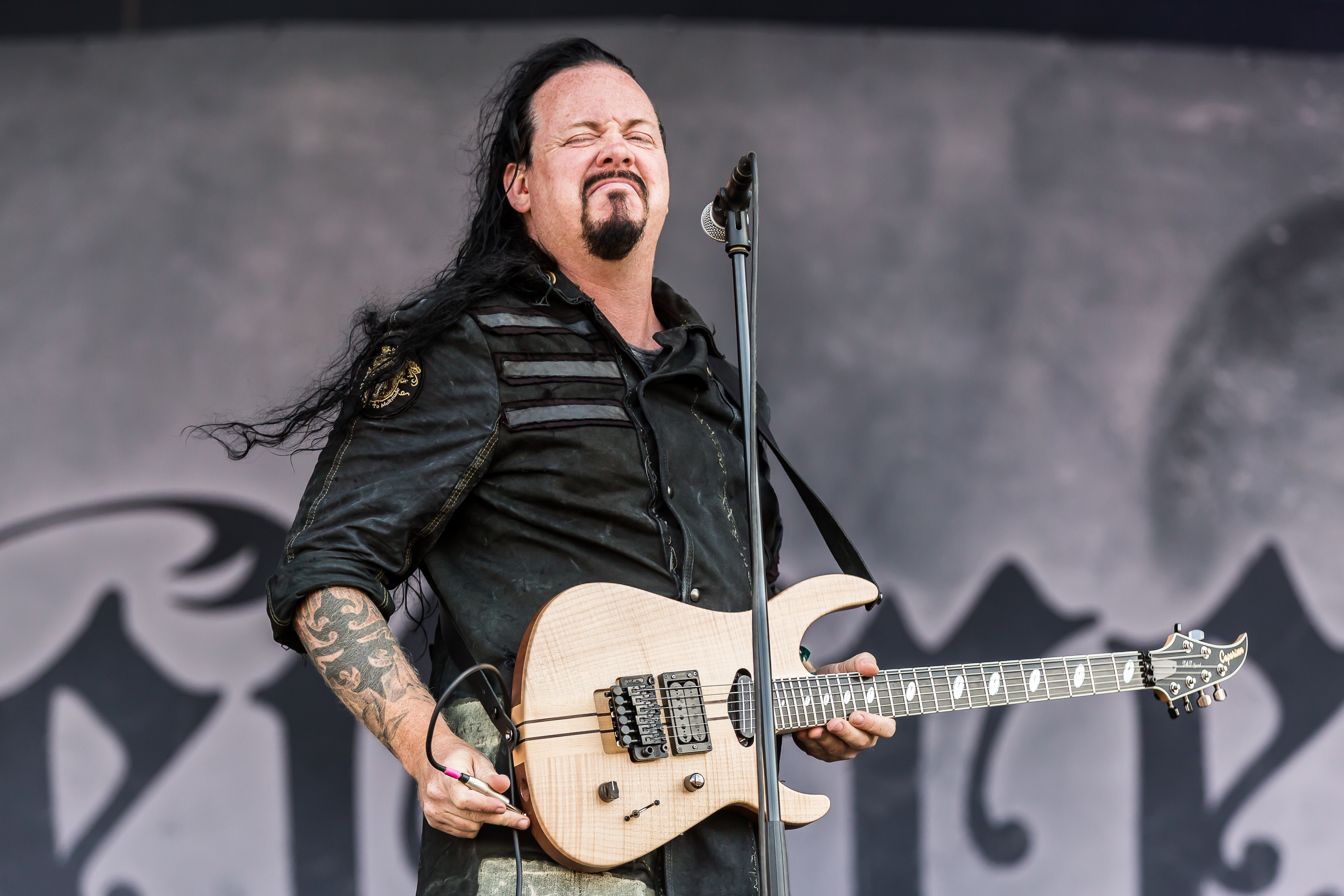
Tom S. Englund

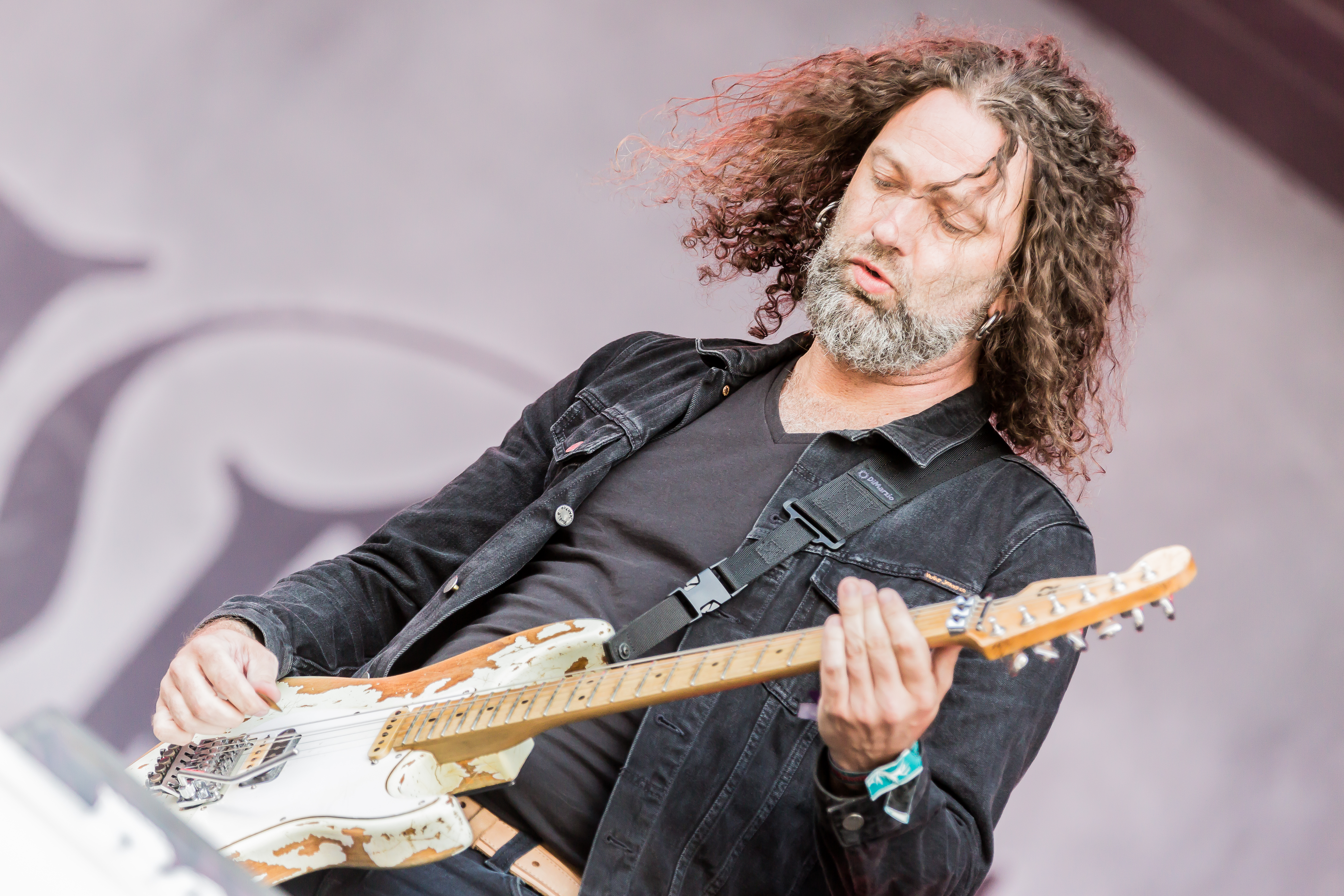
Henrik Danhage

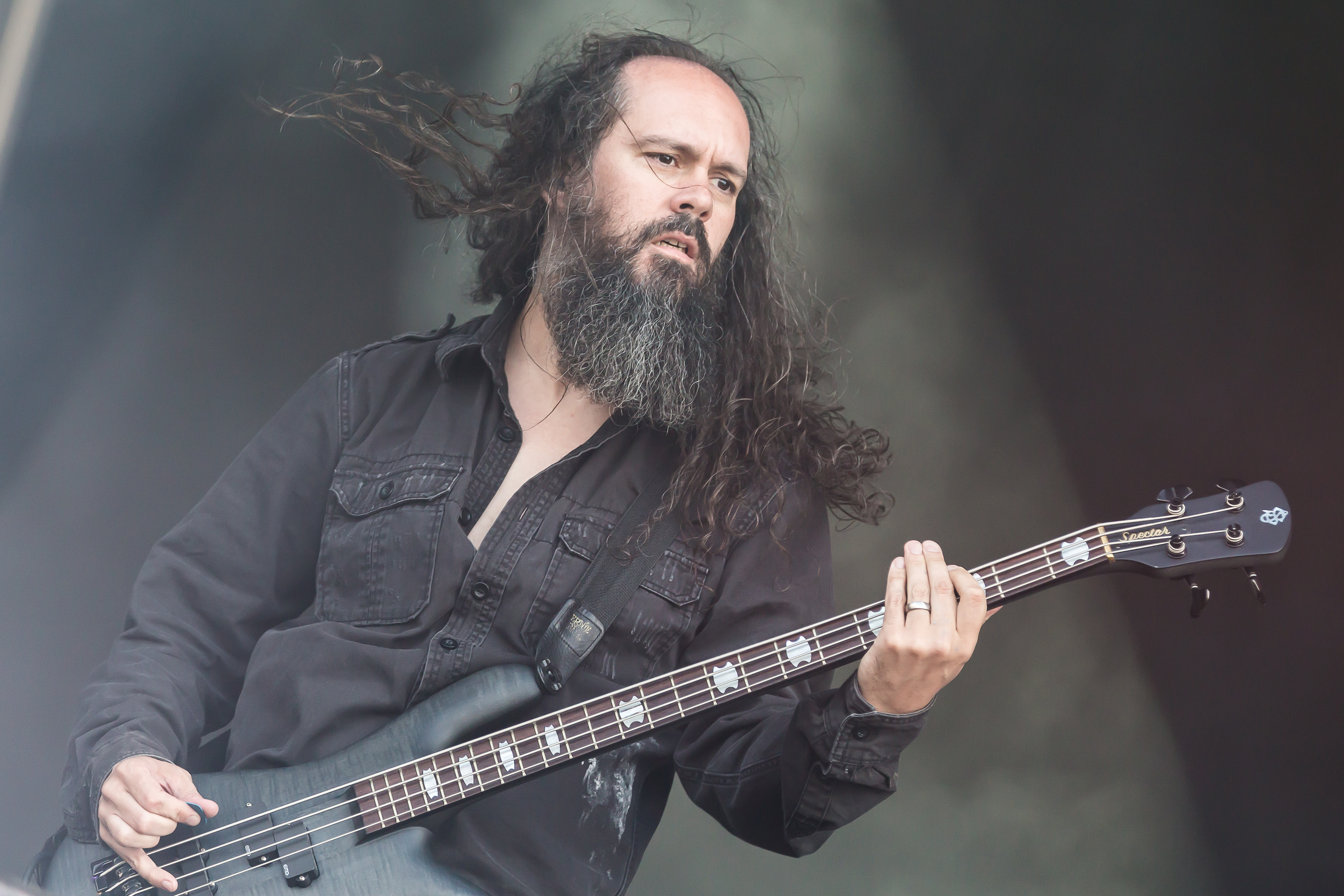
Johan Niemann

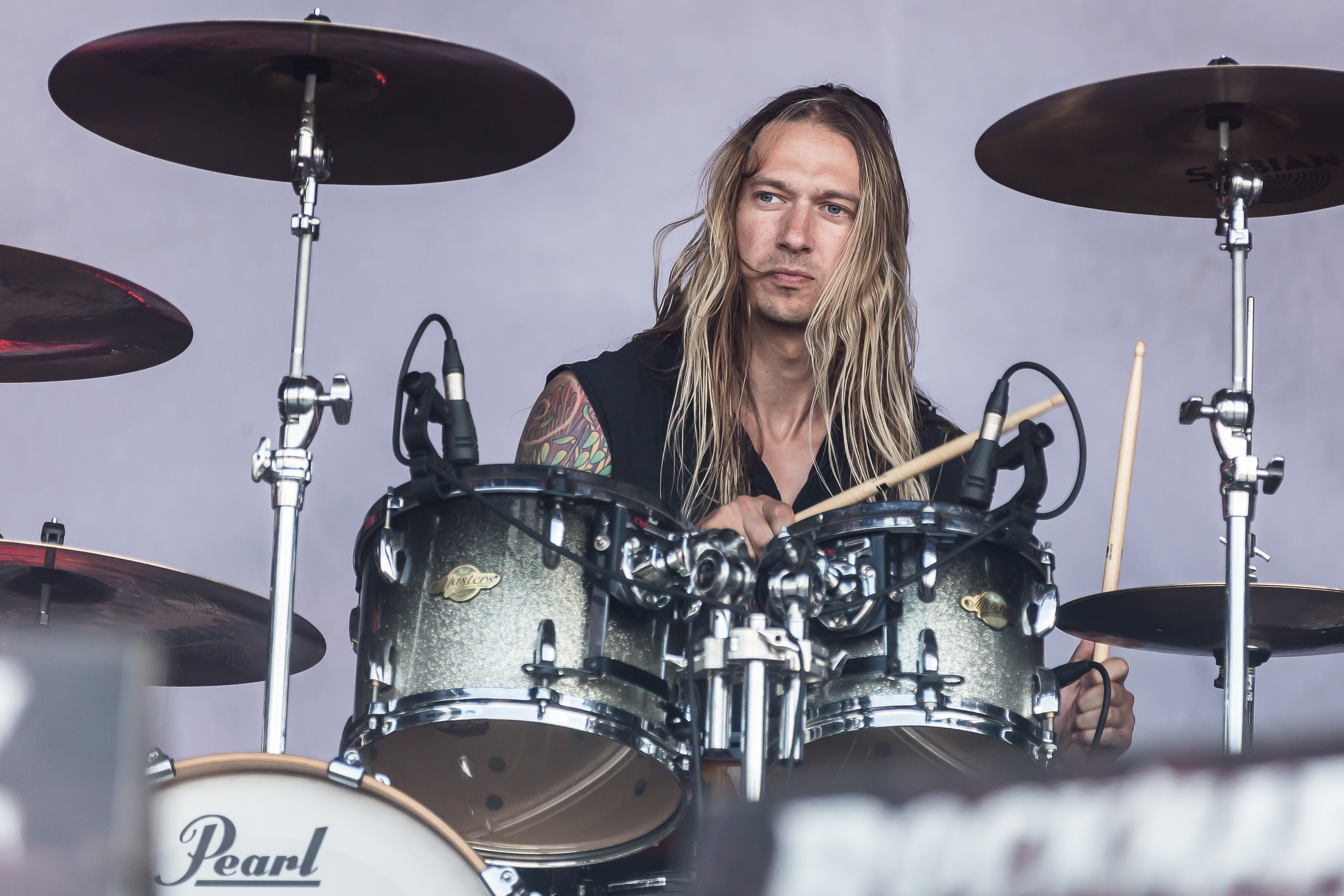
Jonas Ekdahl

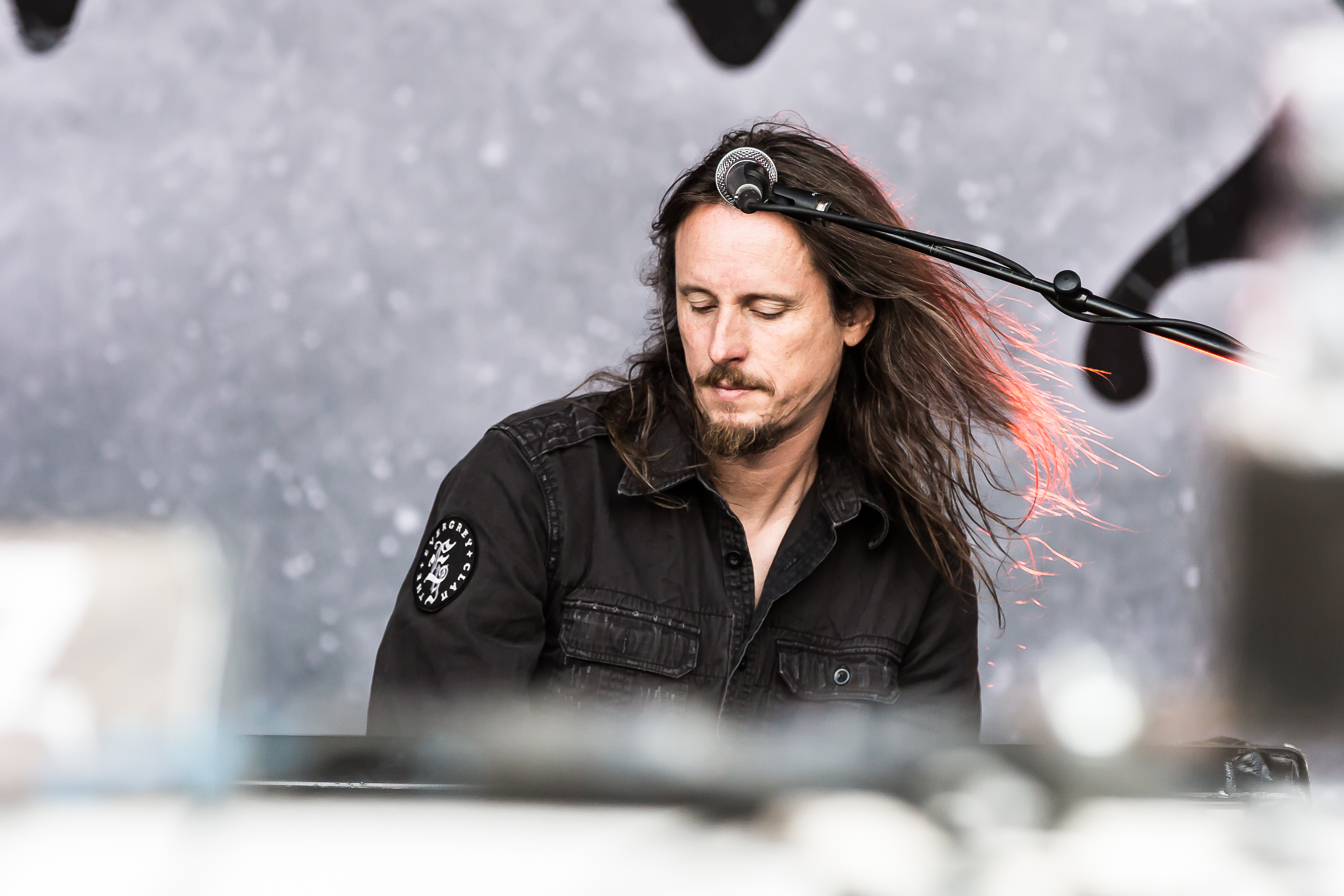
Rikard Zander

Current

- Tom S. Englund – vocals, guitar (1993–present)
- Rikard Zander – keyboards, backing vocals (2002–present)
- Johan Niemann – bass, backing vocals (2010–present)
- Stephen Platt – guitar (2026–present; live 2025–2026)

Guest

- Carina Kjellberg-Englund – vocals (1996–present)

Live

- Christian Krull Grönlund – bass (2007)

Former

- Simen Sandnes - drums (2024-2026)
- Dan Bronell – guitar 1993–2000)
- Patrick Carlsson – drums (1996–2003)
- Daniel Nöjd – bass, vocals (1996–1999)
- Will Chandra – keyboards (1996–1998)
- Sven Karlsson – keyboards (1998–2001)
- Michael Håkansson – bass (1999–2006)
- Henrik Danhage – guitar, backing vocals (2000–2010, 2014–2026)
- Christian Rehn – keyboards (2001–2002)
- Jonas Ekdahl – drums (2003–2010, 2014–2024)
- Fredrik Larsson – bass (2007)
- Jari Kainulainen – bass (2007–2010)
- Marcus Jidell – guitar, backing vocals (2010–2013)
- Hannes Van Dahl – drums (2010–2013)

== Discography ==
- The Dark Discovery (1998)
- Solitude, Dominance, Tragedy (1999)
- In Search of Truth (2001)
- Recreation Day (2003)
- The Inner Circle (2004)
- Monday Morning Apocalypse (2006)
- Torn (2008)
- Glorious Collision (2011)
- Hymns for the Broken (2014)
- The Storm Within (2016)
- The Atlantic (2019)
- Escape of the Phoenix (2021)
- A Heartless Portrait (The Orphéan Testament) (2022)
- Theories of Emptiness (2024)
- Architects of a New Weave (2026)
