= Tom S. Englund =

Swedish musician (born 1973)

Tom Englund
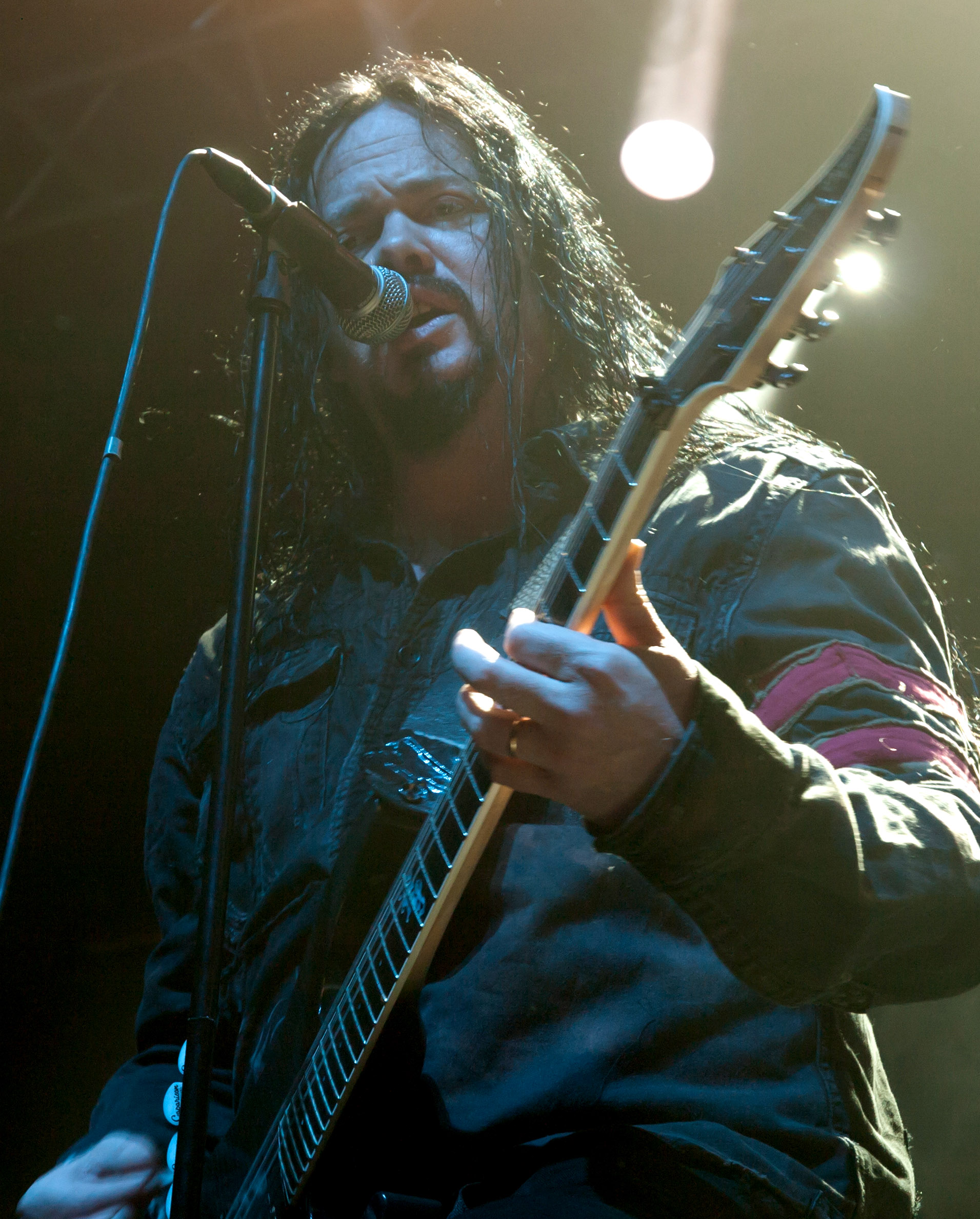
- Englund with Evergrey in 2012

Background information
- Born: 14 December 1973 (age 52)
- Origin: Sweden
- Genres: Progressive metal
- Occupations: Musician, songwriter
- Instruments: Vocals, guitar
- Years active: 1993–present
- Member of: Evergrey, Redemption, Silent Skies

Tom S. Englund (born 14 December 1973) is a Swedish musician. He is best known for being the vocalist and guitarist of the progressive metal band Evergrey, of which he is also a founding member. He is the main songwriter and sole remaining original member of the band.

Englund has been the vocalist of the American progressive metal band Redemption since 2017, replacing Ray Alder. He is also the vocalist and a founding member of the Swedish-American cinematic pop project Silent Skies. He is a contributor to Arjen Anthony Lucassen's Ayreon project, performing vocals on the album 01011001 on the tracks "Age of Shadows", "Unnatural Selection" and "The Sixth Extinction". He reprised those parts on 01011001 – Live Beneath the Waves. Englund has composed music for video game developer Saber Interactive.

== Discography ==
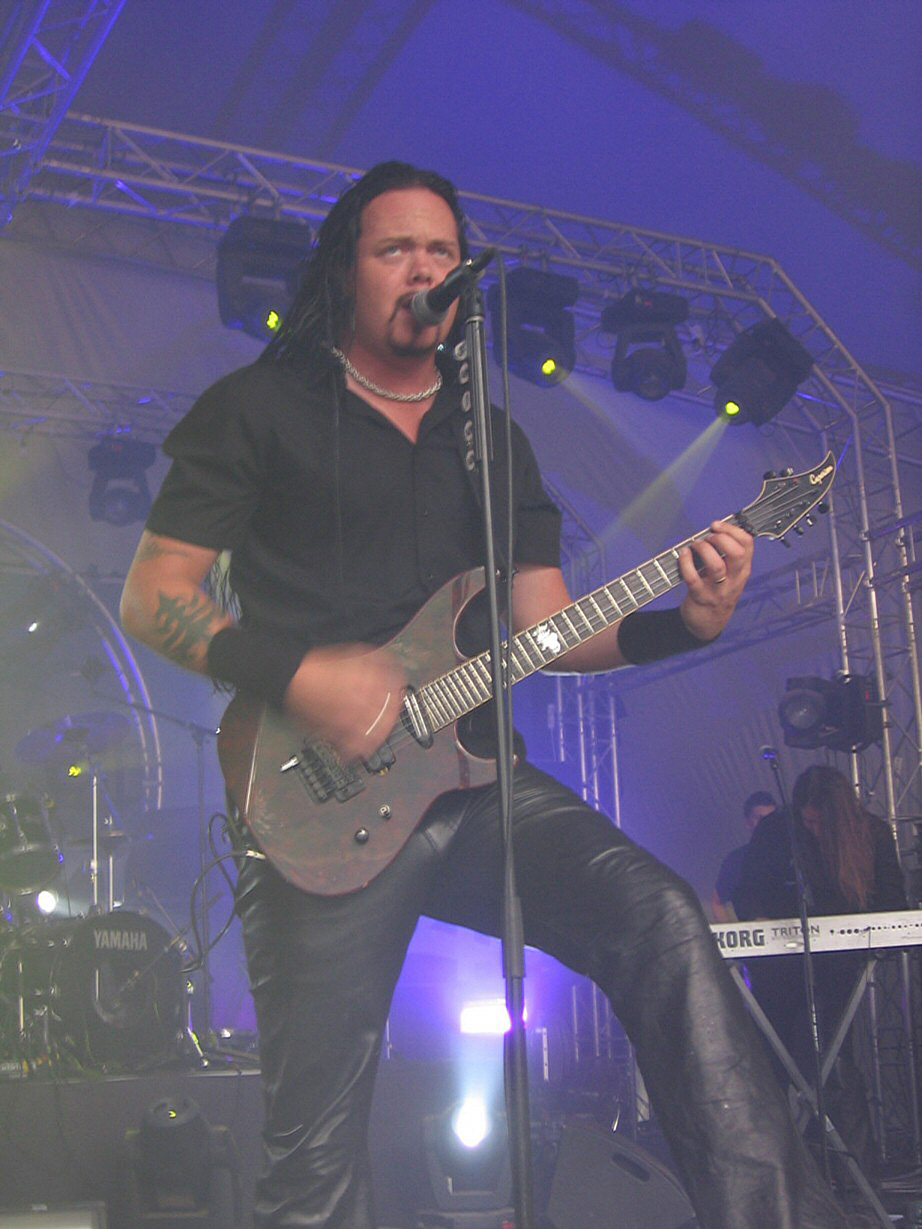
Englund performing in 2005

=== With Evergrey ===
- The Dark Discovery (1998)
- Solitude, Dominance, Tragedy (1999)
- In Search of Truth (2001)
- Recreation Day (2003)
- The Inner Circle (2004)
- Monday Morning Apocalypse (2006)
- Torn (2008)
- Glorious Collision (2011)
- Hymns for the Broken (2014)
- The Storm Within (2016)
- The Atlantic (2019)
- Escape of the Phoenix (2021)
- A Heartless Portrait (The Orphéan Testament) (2022)
- Theories of Emptiness (2024)
- Architects of a new weave (2026)

=== With Redemption ===
- Long Night's Journey into Day (2018)
- Alive in Color (2020)
- I Am The Storm (2023)

=== With Silent Skies ===
- Satellites (2020)
- Nectar (2022)
- Dormant (2023)

=== As a producer ===
- Dragonland – Starfall (2004)
- Shot Injection – Fear Comes Full Circle (2006)
- Awake (UK) – Illumination (2007)

=== Guest appearances ===
- Nightrage – Sweet Vengeance (clean vocals on "Hero", "Etheral", "Circle of Pain" and "At the Ends of the Earth") (2003)
- Dragonland – Starfall (backing vocals and lead guitars on "Calling My Name" and "The Shores of Our Land") (2004)
- Moonlight Agony – Echoes Of A Nightmare (lead guitars on "Equilibrium") (2004)
- Shot Injection – Eleven Triple Manifest (vocals on "Suicide Scenario") (2006)
- Odin's Court – Deathanity (vocals on "Mammonific") (2008)
- Ayreon – 01011001 (vocals on "Age of Shadows", "Unnatural Selection" and "The Sixth Extinction") (2008)
- Dreamtone & Iris Mavraki's Neverland – Reversing Time (vocals on "World Beyond These Walls") (2008)
- Mind Key – Pulse for a Graveheart (vocals on "Graveheart") (2009)
- Emergency Gate – The Nemesis Construct (vocals on "Dark Side Of The Sun") (2010)
- The Absence – Enemy Unbound (guitar solo on "Malestrom) (2010)
- Sweden United – "Open Your Eyes" (vocals) (2010)
- Nightrage – Insidious (vocals) (2011)
- Twintera – Lines (vocals on "Oversight") (2012)
- Epysode – Fantasmagoria (vocals) (2013)
- Mental Circus – Mental Circus (vocals on "Shards of You") (2013)
- Ethernity – Obscure Illusions (vocals on "Obscure Illusions") (2015)
- DGM – The Passage (vocals on "Ghosts of Insanity") (2016)
- North of South – The Tides in Our Veins (vocals on "Soul Cartopgraphy") (2021)
- Demon Hunter – Exile (vocals on "Silence The World") (2022)
- Stranger Vision – Wasteland (vocals on "The Deep") (2022)
- Dark Side of The Moon – Metamorphosis (vocals on "Misty Mountains") (2023)
- Ayreon – 01011001 – Live Beneath the Waves (vocals on "Age of Shadows", "Unnatural Selection" and "The Sixth Extinction") (2024)

== Equipment ==
- Caparison Guitars (TAT Special)
- Bogner Überschall
- Peavey poweramp 50/50
- 4 4×12 cabinets
- Shure Wireless Systems
- Korg Triton Syntheseizer
- Korg N364 Syntheseizer
