= Amaranthe discography =

Heavy metal group discography

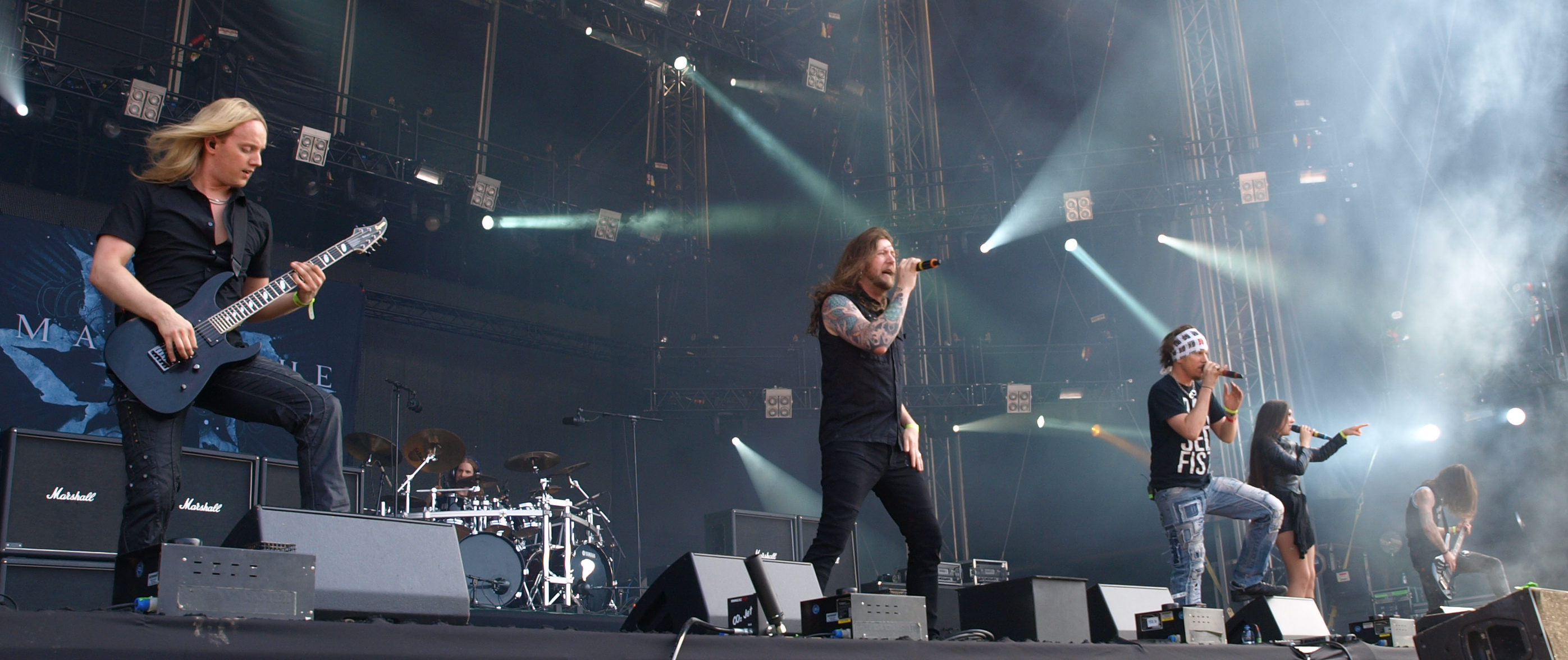
- Amaranthe performing in 2012
- Studio albums: 7
- EPs: 1
- Compilation albums: 1
- Singles: 36
- Music videos: 33

Amaranthe is a Swedish heavy metal band from Gothenburg, known for their combination of pop rock and death metal. Their discography consists of seven studio albums, one compilation album, one extended play, thirty-six singles, and thirty-three music videos. To date, the band has sold 500,000 album copies worldwide.

The band was formed in 2008, under the original name Avalanche. After signing a recording contract with Spinefarm Records, they changed their name to Amaranthe, and released the extended play Leave Everything Behind (2009). The band's debut studio album, Amaranthe (2011), achieved moderate chart success in Sweden, Finland, and Japan. Their second album, The Nexus (2013), peaked within the top ten in both Sweden and Finland, and sold 1,700 copies in its first week.

Massive Addictive (2014), Amaranthe's third album, found chart success in new territories, including Germany and the United States. The album featured the single "Drop Dead Cynical", which reached number twenty-seven on the Mainstream Rock chart in the United States, their first and only single to do so. After the release of the compilation album Breaking Point: B-Sides 2011–2015 (2015), the band recorded their fourth album Maximalism (2016). Continuing on the success of Massive Addictive, it charted within the top ten in Sweden and Finland, and found commercial success in several other territories. The album was nominated for a Grammis award for Best Hard Rock/Heavy Metal album.

== Albums ==
=== Studio albums ===
List of studio albums, with selected chart positions and certifications
Title	Album details	Peak chart positions								Certifications
Title	Album details	SWE	BEL (Note: Indicates chart positions in Wallonia, Belgium.)	CAN	FIN	GER	JPN	SWI	US	Certifications
Amaranthe	Released: 13 April 2011; Label: Spinefarm; Formats: CD, digital download	35	—	—	16	—	39	—	—	GLF: Gold
The Nexus	Released: 19 March 2013; Label: Spinefarm; Formats: CD, LP, digital download	6	192	—	4	—	31	90	—	
Massive Addictive	Released: 21 October 2014; Label: Spinefarm; Formats: CD, LP, digital download	18	—	—	6	89	14	53	105	
Maximalism	Released: 21 October 2016; Label: Spinefarm; Formats: CD, LP, digital download	4	—	91	3	84	24	44	169	
Helix	Released: 19 October 2018; Label: Spinefarm; Formats: CD, LP, digital download	19	101	—	4	29	—	21	—	
Manifest	Released: 2 October 2020; Label: Nuclear Blast; Formats: CD, LP, digital download	23	56	—	4	12	—	14	—	
The Catalyst	Released: 23 February 2024; Label: Nuclear Blast; Formats: CD, LP, digital download	—	52	—	21	3	—	6	—	
"—" denotes a recording that did not chart or was not released in that territory.

=== Compilation albums ===
List of compilation albums
Title	Album details
Breaking Point: B-Sides 2011–2015	Released: 30 October 2015; Label: Spinefarm; Formats: CD, digital download

== Extended plays ==
List of extended plays
Title	EP details
Leave Everything Behind	Released: 18 February 2009; Label: Spinefarm; Formats: CD

== Singles ==
List of singles, with selected chart positions and certifications, showing year released and album name
Title	Year	Peak chart positions			Certifications	Album
Title	Year	US Main.	FIN Down.	FIN Radio	Certifications	Album
"Leave Everything Behind"	2009	—	—	—		Leave Everything Behind
"Hunger"	2011	—	—	—	GLF: Platinum	Amaranthe
"Rain"	2011	—	—	—		Amaranthe
"Amaranthine"	2011	—	—	—	GLF: Platinum	Amaranthe
"1.000.000 Lightyears"	2012	—	—	—	GLF: Gold	Amaranthe
"The Nexus"	2013	—	28	86	GLF: Platinum	The Nexus
"Burn with Me"	2013	—	—	—		The Nexus
"Invincible"	2013	—	—	—		The Nexus
"Drop Dead Cynical"	2014	27	29	52	GLF: Gold	Massive Addictive
"Dynamite"	2014	—	—	—		Massive Addictive
"Trinity"	2014	—	—	—		Massive Addictive
"Digital World"	2015	—	—	—		Massive Addictive
"That Song"	2016	—	—	—		Maximalism
"Fury"	2016	—	—	—		Maximalism
"Boomerang"	2017	—	—	95		Maximalism
"Maximize"	2017	—	—	—		Maximalism
"365"	2018	—	—	—		Helix
"Countdown"	2018	—	—	—		Helix
"Inferno"	2018	—	—	75		Helix
"Dream"	2019	—	—	—		Helix
"Helix"	2019	—	—	—		Helix
"GG6"	2019	—	—	—		Helix
"82nd All the Way" (Sabaton cover)	2020	—	—	—		Manifest
"Do or Die" (featuring Angela Gossow)	2020	—	—	—		Manifest
"Viral"	2020	—	—	—		Manifest
"Strong" (featuring Noora Louhimo)	2020	—	—	27		Manifest
"Archangel"	2020	—	—	—		Manifest
"Fearless"	2020	—	—	—		Manifest
"BOOM!1"	2020	—	—	—		Manifest
"PvP"	2021	—	—	—		Non-album single
"Find Life"	2022	—	—	—		The Catalyst
"Make It Better" (featuring Jennifer Haben)	2022	—	—	—		Single Version of "Make It Better" from Manifest
"Damnation Flame"	2023	—	—	—		The Catalyst
"Insatiable"	2023	—	—	—		The Catalyst
"Outer Dimensions"	2023	—	—	—		The Catalyst
"Re-Vision"	2024	—	—	—		The Catalyst
"Interference"	2024	—	—	—		The Catalyst
"Chaos Theory"	2026	—	—	—		Non-album single
"—" denotes a recording that did not chart or was not released in that territory.

== Music videos ==
List of music videos, with the director and year released
Title	Year	Director(s)	Ref.
"Hunger"	2011	Patric Ullaeus	
"Amaranthine"	2011	Patric Ullaeus	
"1.000.000 Lightyears"	2012	Johan Carlén	
"The Nexus"	2013	Patric Ullaeus	
"Burn with Me"	2013	Patric Ullaeus	
"Invincible"	2013	Patric Ullaeus	
"Drop Dead Cynical"	2014	Patric Ullaeus	
"Digital World"	2015	Patric Ullaeus	
"True"	2015	Patric Ullaeus	
"That Song"	2016	Patric Ullaeus	
"Boomerang"	2017	Patric Ullaeus	
"Maximize"	2017	Ville Juurikkala	
"365"	2018	Patric Ullaeus	
"Countdown"	2018	Patric Ullaeus	
"Dream"	2019	Jens De Vos	
"Helix"	2019	Patric Ullaeus	
"GG6"	2019	Patric Ullaeus	
"82nd All the Way"	2020	Amaranthe	
"Do or Die" (featuring Angela Gossow)	2020	Marcus Overbeck	
"Endlessly"	2020	Duminciuc Bogdan	
"Viral"	2020	Marcus Overbeck	
"Strong" (featuring Noora Louhimo)	2020	Ville Juurikkala	
"Archangel"	2020	GRUPA 13	
"Fearless"	2020	GRUPA 13	
"BOOM!1"	2020	GRUPA 13	
"PVP"	2021	GRUPA 13	
"Crystalline"	2022	GRUPA 13	
"Find Life"	2022	Patric Ullaeus	
"Damnation Flame"	2023	GRUPA 13	
"Insatiable"	2023	Patric Ullaeus	
"Outer Dimensions"	2023	Patric Ullaeus	
"Re-Vision"	2024	Patric Ullaeus	
"The Catalyst"	2024	Patric Ullaeus	
"Interference"	2024	Jens De Vos	
"Chaos Theory"	2026	Jens De Vos	

== Guest appearances ==
- "Army of the Night" (Powerwolf cover - originally from the album Blessed & Possessed (July 17, 2015), released on July 20, 2018 on the Communio Lupatum of Powerwolf's album The Sacrament of Sin)
