= Nebularium =

2001 studio album by Disarmonia Mundi

Studio album by Disarmonia Mundi
- Released: 2001
- Recorded: 2001 at dB Studio
- Genre: Melodic death metal
- Length: 48:06
- Language: English
- Label: Independent
- Producer: Ettore Rigotti

Disarmonia Mundi chronology
Nebularium (2001)	Fragments of D-Generation (2004)

The Restless Memoirs

EP by Disarmonia Mundi
- Released: 26 June 2009
- Recorded: 1999–2006 and mastered in 2009 by Ettore Rigotti at The Metal House Studio
- Genre: Melodic death metal
- Language: English
- Label: Coroner Records
- Producer: Ettore Rigotti

Disarmonia Mundi chronology
Mind Tricks (2006)	The Restless Memoirs (2009)	The Isolation Game (2009)

Nebularium is the debut studio album by the Italian melodic death metal band Disarmonia Mundi. It was independently released and recorded by Ettore Rigotti in his home studio. The album would help the group obtain a recording contract with Italian-based Scarlet Records. The album was re-released on 26 June 2009 in a remastered version with new artwork as a double digipak with a new EP entitled The Restless Memoirs.

== Track listing ==
1. "Into D.M." – 3:06
2. "Blue Lake" – 7:02
3. "Mechanichell" – 5:02
4. "Guilty Claims" – 7:15
5. "Burning Cells" – 4:38
6. "Demiurgo" – 7:07
7. "Nebularium" – 7:07
8. "Awakening" – 2:51
9. "Chester" (live in-studio bonus) – 3:58

== The Restless Memoirs track listing ==
1. "Across the Burning Surface" – 4:12 (recorded in 2006)
2. "Flare" – 3:08 (recorded in 1999)
3. "Spiral Dancer" – 3:40 (recorded in 2005)
4. "Kneeling on Broken glass" – 3:48 (recorded in 2006)
5. "Chester" – 3:56 (recorded in 2000)
6. "Ghost Song" – 3:15 (recorded in 1999)

Comes with the Nebularium album

== Personnel ==
Disarmonia Mundi

- Benny Bianco Chinto – vocals
- Ettore Rigotti – guitars, drums, keyboards, vocals
- Simone Palermiti – guitars, keyboards
- Mirco Andreis – bass
- Claudio Ravinale (The Restless Memoirs only) − vocals, lyrics
- Federico Cagliero a.k.a. "FedAz" – guitar solos on tracks 1, 2, 3, 4, 5, 6, 7; guitars/songwriting on "Awakening" and "Chester"

Production and other

- Produced and recorded by Ettore Rigotti at dB Studio
- Mixed and mastered by Ettore Rigotti and Alessandro Vanara at dB Studio – summer 2001
- Artwork by Marco Corti
- Artwork conceived and realized by Marco Corti
