= Smash into Pieces =

Swedish rock band

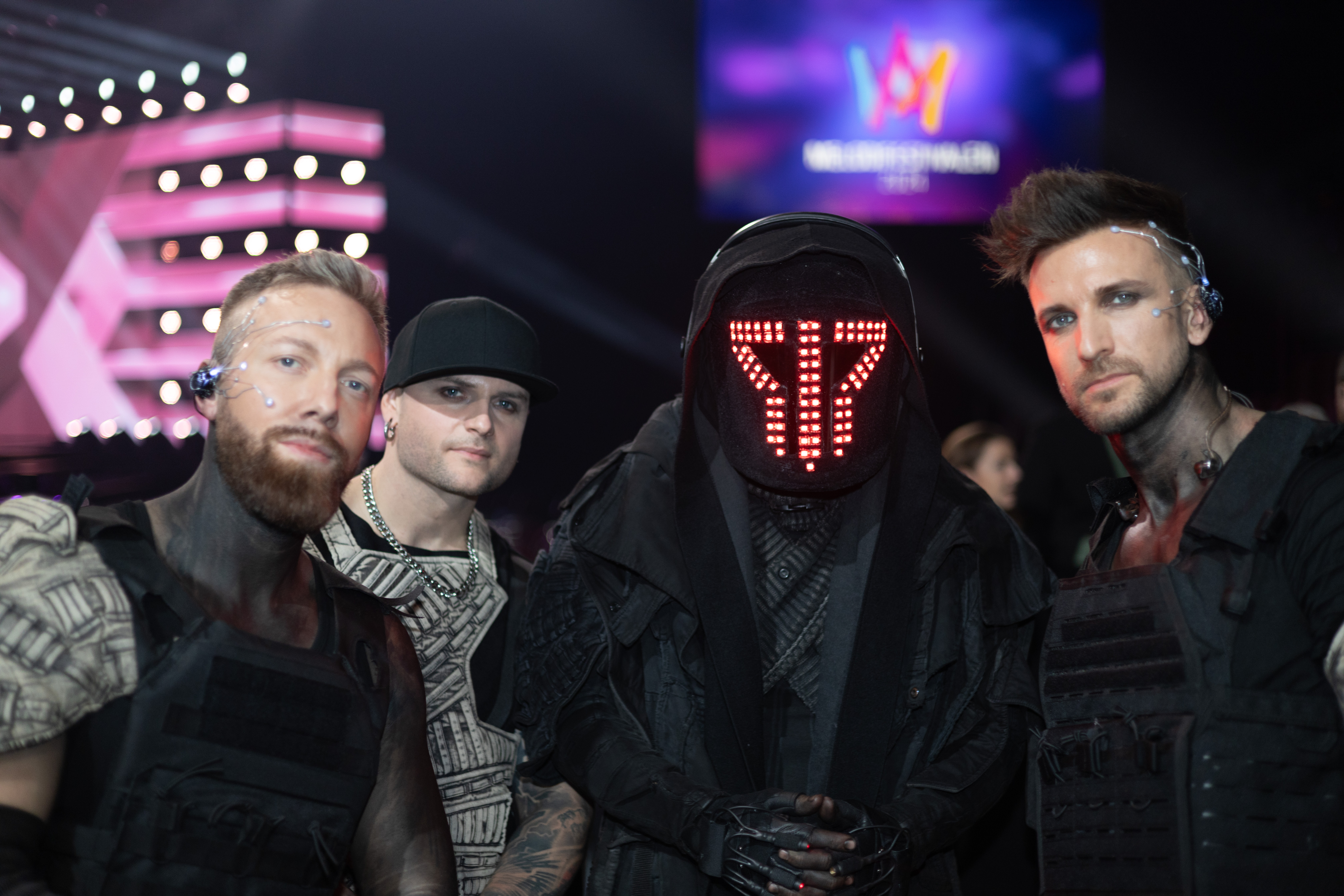
- Smash into Pieces in 2024

Background information
- Origin: Örebro, Sweden
- Genres: alternative metal; alternative rock; electronic rock
- Years active: 2008–present
- Labels: Sony; Gain
- Members: Chris Adam Hedman Sörbye; Benjamin Jennebo; Per Bergquist; APOC
- Past members: Isak Snow; Viktor Vidlund

Smash into Pieces is a Swedish rock band formed in 2008 in Örebro. They have released nine studio albums so far.

== History ==
The band was formed in 2008 by members Benjamin Jennebo, Per Bergquist formerly of CLOSER, Isak Snow, Viktor Vidlund and Chris Adam Hedman Sörbye. They released their first single, "Fading", in 2009, which peaked at number 33 on the Swedish singles chart. In 2012, they signed a contract with Gain Music Entertainment, which is a part of Sony Music Entertainment. A few months later, during the "Bandit Rock Awards", they received the award for "Band Revelation of the Year".

Smash into Pieces' debut album, Unbreakable, released on 10 April 2013, peaked at number 7 in the Swedish albums chart. It was followed by a European tour, first alongside Amaranthe and Deals Death, and later alongside Alter Bridge and Halestorm. Their second album, The Apocalypse DJ, was released on 25 February 2015, preceded by the single "Checkmate". During 2015, the singles "Stronger" and "Color of Your Eyes" were released. Shortly before the second album was out, Isak Snow left the band, and was replaced by APOC. On 6 January 2016, they released the single "Merry Go Round" in anticipation of the third studio album. That album, titled Rise and Shine, was released on 27 January 2017. In this album, the main singles were "Higher" and "Boomerang". Following the release of the third album, Viktor Vidlund left the band. Only one year after the release of Rise and Shine, on 12 October 2018, the band's fourth album, Evolver, was released. The band released their fifth album, Arcadia, on 28 August 2020, accompanied by a comic book tying the story into the music videos from the album. Their sixth album, A New Horizon, was released one year later on 27 August 2021. The album was treated as a sequel to Arcadia, with the music videos from the album continuing the story told from its predecessor. A deluxe version was released on 29 October 2021, featuring an acoustic version of each song. In 2022, the band embarked on a tour of the United States as a support act to Starset and Red, accompanied by Fame on Fire. They continued touring for the remainder of the year across Europe while releasing their seventh album Disconnect on 9 September 2022.

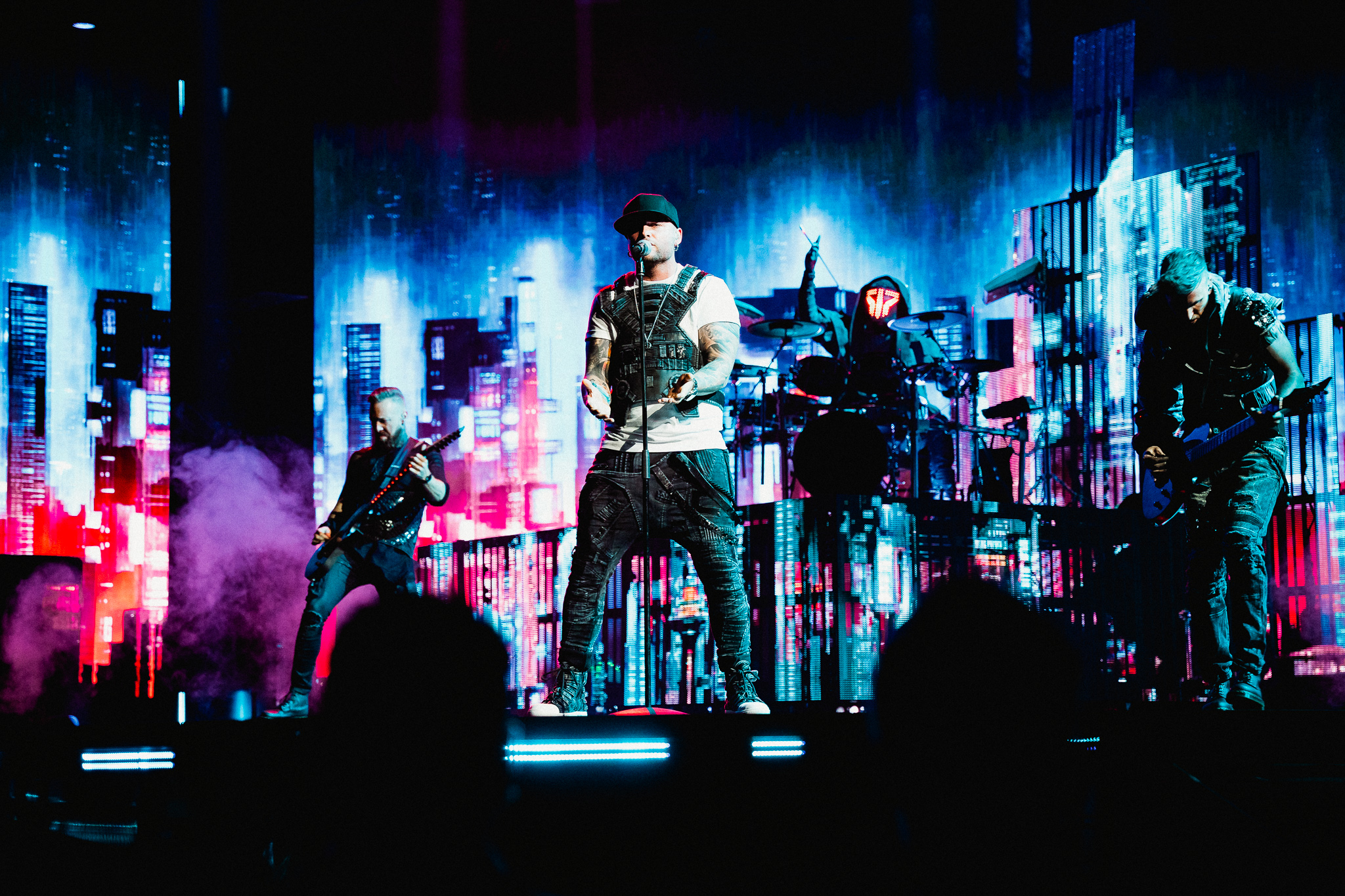
Smash into Pieces in 2023

Smash into Pieces competed in the Melodifestivalen 2023 with the song "Six Feet Under". They participated in the fourth heat of the competition on 25 February 2023. They came in second place in the heat, allowing them to progress to the final on 11 March 2023. The song was released on digital platforms that same evening. The song peaked at number 2 in the Swedish singles chart. The band embarked on their first headline North America tour, supported by Citizen Soldier. Following the tour, they released an acoustic version of Six Feet Under with Citizen Soldier. They also confirmed they were working on an eighth album due for release later in the year, in addition to a European tour with Cyan Kicks. "The Tide" was released in April 2023, and in June another single, "Flow" was released. Three more singles were released in 2023: "Watching Over You" in August, "Out Of Here" in September, and "Venom" in November. The band confirmed the name of their eighth album to be Ghost Code on a behind-the-scenes Patreon video. The album was released on 12 April 2024, preceded by the single "Trigger" on 5 January 2024. The band participated in Melodifestivalen 2024 with the song "Heroes Are Calling"; they took the victory of their heat on 3 February 2024 and qualified directly to the grand final. In the final, they came in 3rd place with 90 points.

They released their 9th album Armaheaven on 31 October 2025, which peaked at 10th place in the Swedish album chart. They are expected to go on a European tour in spring 2026 following the album's release. In December 2025, it was announced that Smash Into Pieces would participate in Melodifestivalen 2026 with the song "Hollow". They placed fourth in the final.

== Musical style ==
AllMusic described the band as "highly melodic" and said they combined "slick pop-metal and electro-rock." Metal Hammer called them an alternative metal band.

== Members ==
=== Current members ===
- Chris Adam Hedman Sörbye – vocals (2008–present)
- Benjamin Jennebo – lead guitar (2008–present)
- Per Bergquist – rhythm guitar (2008–present)
- APOC – drums (2015–present)
- Emanuel Magnil – live guitarist

=== Past members ===
- Isak Snow – drums (2008–2015)
- Viktor Vidlund – bass (2008–2017)

== Discography ==
=== Extended plays ===
- Smash into Pieces (2009)
- Fading (2009)

=== Studio albums ===
- Unbreakable (2013)
- The Apocalypse DJ (2015)
- Rise and Shine (2017)
- Evolver (2018)
- Arcadia (2020)
- A New Horizon (2021)
- Disconnect (2022)
- Ghost Code (2024)
- Armaheaven (2025)

=== Singles ===
==== As lead artist ====
Title	Year	Peak chart positions	Album
Title	Year	SWE	Album
"Fading"	2009	33	Unbreakable
"I Want You to Know"	2012	—	Unbreakable
"Colder"	2012	—	Unbreakable
"A Friend Like You"	2013	—	Unbreakable
"Unbreakable"	2013	—	Unbreakable
"Come Along"	2014	—	Unbreakable
"Disaster Highway"	2014	—	The Apocalypse DJ
"Checkmate"	2015	—	The Apocalypse DJ
"Stronger"	2015	—	The Apocalypse DJ
"Color of Your Eyes"	2015	—	The Apocalypse DJ
"Rock N Roll (The Apocalypse Tribute)"	2015	—	The Apocalypse DJ
"Merry Go Round"	2016	—	Rise and Shine
"Let Me Be Your Superhero"	2016	—	Rise and Shine
"Higher"	2016	—	Rise and Shine
"YOLO"	2017	—	Rise and Shine
"Boomerang" (feat. Jay Smith)	2017	—	Non-album single
"Radioactive Mother (Lover)"	2017	—	Non-album single
"Superstar in Me"	2018	—	Evolver
"Ride with U"	2018	—	Evolver
"In Need of Medicine"	2018	—	Evolver
"Paradise"	2018	—	Evolver
"Like This!"	2018	—	Evolver
"My Precious"	2019	—	Evolver
"Human"	2019	—	Non-album single
"Arcadia"	2019	—	Arcadia
"Ego"	2019	—	Arcadia
"Mad World" (Tears for Fears cover)	2020	—	Arcadia
"Godsent" / "All Eyes on You"	2020	—	Arcadia
"Everything They S4Y"	2020	—	Arcadia
"Big Bang"	2020	—	Arcadia
"Counting on Me"	2020	—	Arcadia
"Wake Up"	2020	—	Arcadia
"Rise Up"	2021	—	A New Horizon
"Real One"	2021	—	A New Horizon
"My Wildest Dream / "Bangarang"	2021	—	A New Horizon
"Broken Parts"	2021	—	A New Horizon
"Cut You Off"	2021	—	A New Horizon
"Glow in the Dark"	2021	—	A New Horizon
"The Rain"	2021	—	Disconnect
"Not Waiting for Heaven"	2021	—	Non-album single
"Deadman"	2022	—	Disconnect
"Vanguard"	2022	—	Disconnect
"A Shot in the Dark"	2022	—	Disconnect
"Valhalla"	2022	—	Disconnect
"Heathens"	2022	—	Disconnect
"Throne"	2022	—	Disconnect
"Freight Train"	2022	—	Disconnect
"Guillotine"	2022	—	Disconnect
"Sleepwalking"	2022	—	Ghost Code
"Six Feet Under"	2023	2	Ghost Code
"The Tide"	2023	—	Ghost Code
"Flow"	2023	—	Ghost Code
"Watching Over You"	2023	—	Ghost Code
"Out of Here"	2023	—	Ghost Code
"Venom"	2023	—	Ghost Code
"Trigger"	2024	—	Ghost Code
"Heroes Are Calling"	2024	4	Ghost Code
"Flame" (with LIAMOO)	2024	—	Armaheaven
"In the End" (with ER and Samuel Ericsson) (Linkin Park cover)	2024	—	Non-album single
"Wildfire"	2024	—	Armaheaven
"Hurricane"	2024	—	Armaheaven
"Maze of Fools"	2024	—	Armaheaven
"Heroes" (Måns Zelmerlöw cover)	2025	—	Non-album single
"Man or Machine"	2025	—	Armaheaven
"Paradise" (feat. Elize Ryd)	2025	—	Armaheaven
"A Sky Full of Stars"	2025	—	Armaheaven
"Broken Halo"	2025	—	Armaheaven
"Devil in My Head"	2025	—	Armaheaven
"Hollow"	2026	5	TBA
"Miracle"	2026	—	TBA
"The Best"	2026	—	TBA
"Bad Vibe"	2026	—	TBA

==== As featured artist ====
List of singles as featured artist, with showing year released
Title	Year	Peak chart positions		Album
Title	Year	BEL (FL)	NLD Tip	Album
"Into the Night" (Off Lights featuring Chris Adam of Smash Into Pieces)	2023	—	—	Back to Life EP
"Outcome" (Dead by April featuring Smash into Pieces and Samuel Ericsson)	2024	—	—	The Affliction
"Somebody Like You" (Within Temptation featuring Smash into Pieces)	2026	40	30	Non-album single

=== Music videos ===
List of music videos, showing year released and directors
Title	Year	Director(s)
"Colder"	2013	Patrik Forsberg
"Friend Like You"	2013	Johan Carlén
"Stronger"	2015	11 Frames Production
"Let Me Be Your Superhero"	2017	Unknown
"Boomerang" (feat. Jay Smith)	2017	Lucas Englund
"In Need of Medicine"	2018	Rob F. Blom and Richard Blom
"Superstar in Me"	2018	Lucas Englund
"Arcadia"	2019	René U. Valdes
"Ego" (feat. Marcus Rosell)	2019	René U. Valdes
"Mad World" (Tears for Fears cover)	2020	René U. Valdes
"Everything They S4y"	2020	René U. Valdes
"Big Bang"	2020	René U. Valdes
"Wake Up"	2020	Lucas Englund
"Rise Up"	2021	René U. Valdes
"Wake Up" (Gaming Remix) (feat. Tejbz)	2021	Unknown
"Real One"	2021	René U. Valdes
"My Wildest Dreams"	2021	René U. Valdes
"Broken Parts"	2021	René U. Valdes
"Cut You Off"	2021	René U. Valdes
"Glow in the Dark"	2021	René U. Valdes
"Running Away from Home"	2021	René U. Valdes
"A New Horizon"	2021	René U. Valdes
"The Rain"	2021	Unknown
"Not Waiting for Heaven"	2021	Unknown
"Vanguard"	2022	Pavel Trebukhin
"Heathens"	2022	Unknown
"Reckoning"	2022	Pavel Trebukhin
"The Tide"	2023	Pavel Trebukhin
"Six Feet Under" (Acoustic) (feat. Citizen Soldier)	2023	Christoffer Wannholm
"Flow"	2023	Pavel Trebukhin
"Trigger"	2024	Voxel Visuals
"Heroes Are Calling"	2024	Måns Nyström
"Afterglow"	2024	Måns Nyström
"Flame" (with Liamoo)	2024	John Gyllhamn
"Wildfire"	2024	Måns Nyström
"Maze of Fools"	2024	Måns Nyström
"Heroes"	2025	Måns Nyström
"Paradise" (feat. Elize Ryd)	2025	Peter Lindgren
"A Sky Full of Stars"	2025	Adam Ljung
"Broken Halo"	2025	TRE
"Villain"	2025	Pavel Trebukhin
"Somebody Like You"	2026	Pavel Trebukhin
"Hollow"	2026	TRE
"Miracle"	2026	John Gyllhamn
"The Best"	2026	Unknown
"Bad Vibe"	2026	Marcus Lundin
