= Elize Ryd =

Swedish singer (born 1984)

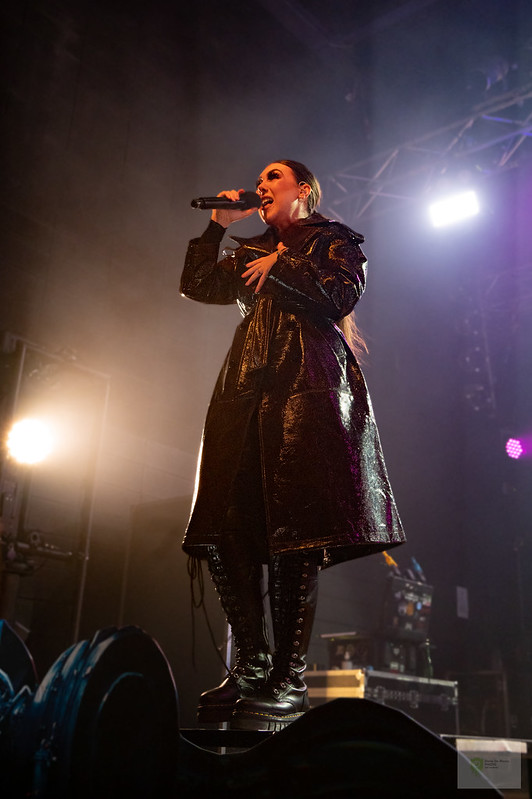
- Ryd performing in 2024

Background information
- Born: Hanna Elise Isabell Maj Höstblomma Ryd; 15 October 1984 (age 41); Värnamo, Sweden
- Genres: Power metal; metalcore; melodic black metal; melodic death metal; symphonic metal; pop metal
- Occupation: Singer
- Years active: 2003–present
- Member of: Amaranthe; Raskasta Joulua
- Website: elizeryd.com

Hanna Elise Isabell Maj Höstblomma Ryd (born 15 October 1984), known professionally as Elize Ryd (Swedish pronunciation: [ɛˈliːs ryːd]), is a Swedish singer, best known as one of the three vocalists and co-lyricist in the heavy metal band Amaranthe. She also gained some popularity prior to the band's inception by performing guest vocals for the American power metal band Kamelot, both on tour and in the studio. She sings in the soprano range.

== Early life ==
Hanna Elise Isabell Maj Höstblomma Ryd was born in Värnamo on 15 October 1984, the daughter of a Swedish father and a half-Finnish mother, both of whom were musicians. She performed in public for the first time when she was four years old. During her childhood, she was influenced by everything from Walt Disney to heavy metal. At the age of 13, she attended and won a 1998 talent show in Gothenburg as the youngest participant. The first prize was a record deal, but since she did not meet the minimum of age of 15, she was ineligible to receive the prize. She received a scholarship for the most promising singer and a spot in a musical called Brödupploppet that was played 76 times at Exercishuset in Gothenburg. She received another scholarship award in 2003, when she graduated from high school.

== Career ==
=== Early career ===
After graduating from a three-year education at a performing arts school, Ryd started her professional singing career as a cabaret performer at the Cabaret Lorensberg in Gothenburg. She also did songs for various local bands such as Falconer. When she met Joacim "Jake E" Lundberg in a club in Gothenburg, he requested that she record vocals for a song with his band Dreamland, titled "Fade Away". Lundberg later introduced her to Olof Mörck, who proposed a collaboration with his band Dragonland, to which she agreed. It was around this time that symphonic metal band Nightwish took interest in Ryd as a replacement for their previous singer Tarja Turunen, although she was ultimately not chosen for the role. At the same time, she, Mörck, and Lundberg talked about starting their own band with her as a lead singer and composer. The band was named Avalanche, which was later renamed to Amaranthe for legal reasons.

=== Amaranthe ===
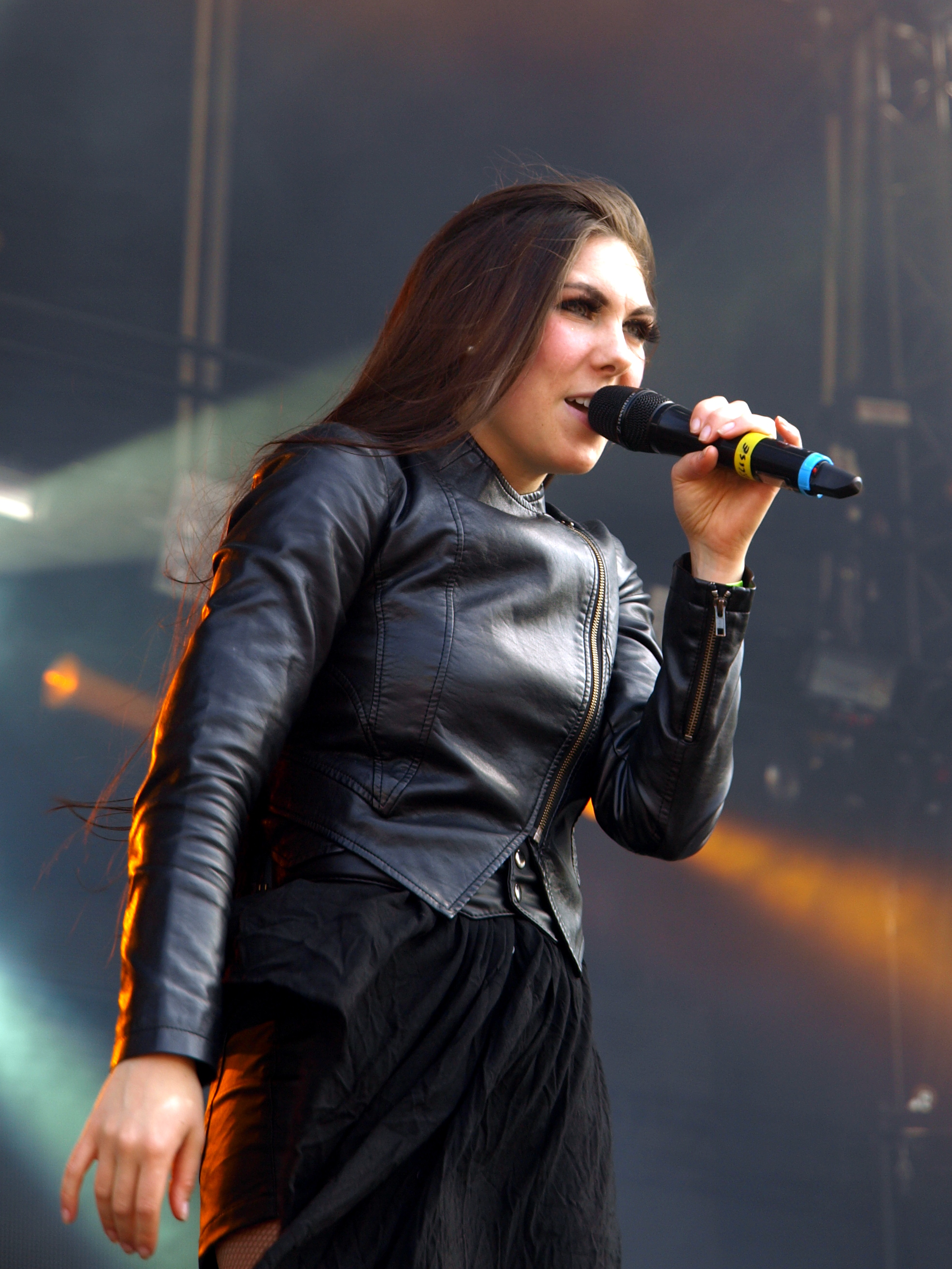
Ryd live with Amaranthe at Tuska Open Air 2013

In early 2009, Amaranthe released their debut EP, Leave Everything Behind. In early 2011, they released their first two singles, "Hunger" and "Rain" before releasing their debut album Amaranthe, which reached a peak position of 35th on Swedish charts and 16th on Finnish Charts. With this album, the band released two music videos: one for the aforementioned song "Hunger" and another for the song "Amaranthine". Both were directed by Patric Ullaeus for Revolver Films. There was also a video shot for "1.000.000 Lightyears", the fourth single from their debut album.

On January 25, 2013, Amaranthe released a new single titled "The Nexus" and a music video on 13 March. Amaranthe's second album, The Nexus, was released in March 2013. Later in 2013, Amaranthe released two videos for their singles "Burn with Me" and "Invincible."

Amaranthe released a new single and video for "Drop-dead cynical" in September 2014. Their third album, Massive Addictive, was released on October 21, 2014, as well as two more videos for "Digital World" and "True" and a lyric video for "Trinity".

=== Kamelot ===
Throughout 2011 and 2012, Ryd joined Kamelot on stage as one of their primary touring vocalists, recorded guest vocals on three tracks for Kamelot's tenth album Silverthorn, and was featured in one music video.

On September 28, 2012, while supporting Nightwish's North American leg of the Imaginaerum World Tour with Kamelot, Ryd and fellow Kamelot touring vocalist Alissa White-Gluz of The Agonist joined symphonic metal band Nightwish for a one-time concert in Denver when their lead vocalist Anette Olzon was hospitalized.

In September 2018, Ryd was part of the DVD recording of "I Am The Empire Live From The 013", released on August 14, 2020.

=== Other collaborations ===
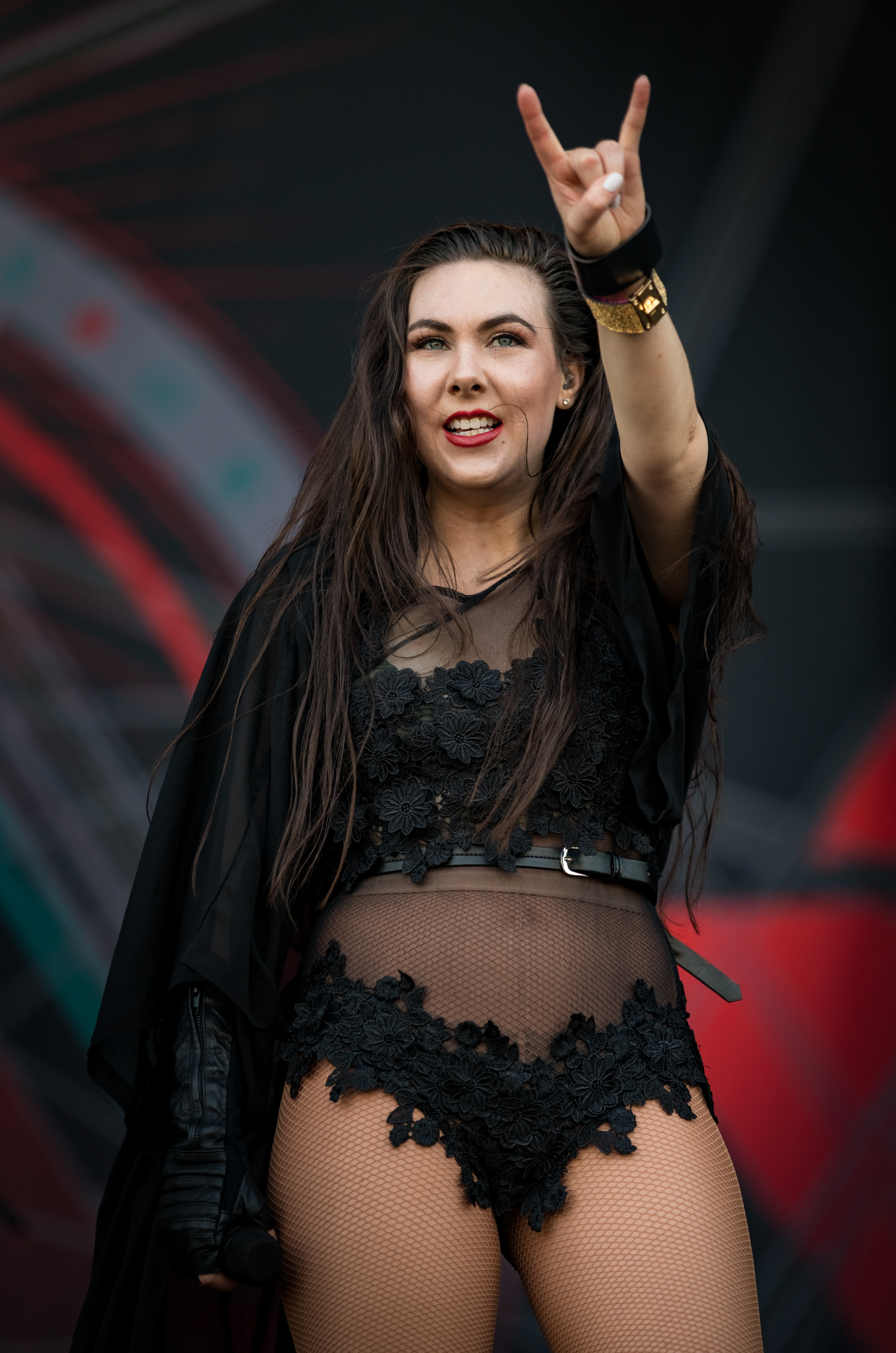
Elize Ryd, 2018

Since Amaranthe's explosion in popularity, Ryd has been featured on songs by several different artists she had not previously collaborated with. In 2011, she had three notable collaborations that were all released commercially. These consisted of guest vocals for Swedish rock band Takida's fourth album The Burning Heart and Renegade Five's September 2011 EP Life Is Already Fading. Beside fellow Amaranthe vocalists Jake E. and Andreas Solveström, Elize was once again featured on a Dragonland album; this time being the band's fifth album Under the Grey Banner.

In 2012, Ryd performed guest vocals on the debut single "Evolution" by the musical project Dreamstate set up by Takida guitarist Tomas Wallin.

In 2013, Ryd performed vocals in the album The Land of New Hope, from a new metal opera project by Timo Tolkki called Avalon, in which she is the main character. The album was released on May 17, 2013. She was also confirmed as one of the vocalists for the second album called Angels of the Apocalypse.

Also in 2013, she recorded a song with the Russian composer Alexey Soloviev. The song is called "Alone in the Universe".

In the end of 2013, Ryd took part in the Raskasta Joulua project, incorporating the sound of metal to Christmas carols. She sang the song "Julen är här" as a duet with Tony Kakko from Sonata Arctica. She also joined the Raskasta Joulua tour for the final gigs. During that visit in Finland, she performed on Finnish national television. There, she sang Ave Maria together with Marko Hietala, the bassist from Nightwish. They sold over 20,000 copies of Raskasta Joulua, which received platinum certification as a result. In 2014, she once again participated on Raskasta Joulua's recordings. She appeared on the album Raknarok Juletide with the song "Christmas Is Here", which is the English version of "Julen är här", also with Tony Kakko on vocals. She also appeared on the follow-up album, Raskasta Joulua 2, where she sang on a cover of Carola Häggkvist's "Himlen i min famn". Raskasta Joulua 2 sold over 20,000 copies and it, too, received platinum certification.

During Bandit Rock Awards 2014, Ryd received the award for the years "Rock & Role Model".

Ryd also performed guest vocals on Timo Tolkki's Avalon album Angels of the Apocalypse, along with Simone Simons, Floor Jansen, Fabio Lione, and other power metal vocalists, which was released on May 16, 2014.

She is also featured on the new Nergard album A Bit Closer to Heaven. It was released in May 2015. The album also features Nils K. Rue (Pagan's Mind), Michael Eriksen (Circus Maximus), and Ralf Scheepers (Primal Fear). Ryd performs on the song "On Through the Storm" and was a duet with the Swedish singer Andi Kravljaca. She is featured on the second Smash into Pieces album, performing on the song "My Cocaine". It was released in February 2015.

She took part in Swedish Melodifestivalen 2015 with Swedish opera tenor Rickard Söderberg. They both sang a song called "One by One", which was composed by Ryd and Jimmy Jansson. They came in 5th place in the first semi-final (2nd of the 2nd round), but, unfortunately, they were eliminated after a big crash of the application. Ryd is featured on the Gus G. album Brand New Revolution, released on July 24, 2015. The song is called "What Lies Below".

She is featured on Docker's Guild album called The Heisenberg Diaries – Book A: Sounds of Future Past, released on January 21, 2016, where she sings the sci-fi soundtrack tunes "Never Ending Story" and "Suspension" (from the Buck Rogers in the 25th Century movie soundtrack) in duet with Douglas R. Docker. (2016) On March 5, 2016, a new single, "At the Break of Dawn", featuring Ryd, was released by the Finnish band Arion.

In December 2016, Ryd once again joined the Raskasta Joulua tour for eight gigs in Finland. In March 2017, she joined the guitarist Gus G. for a few dates in Japan. In December 2017, Ryd again joined the Raskasta Joulua tour for their gigs in Finland and is featured on their song "Stjärnan i min hand". The next years, Ryd again joined the Raskasta Joulua tour for gigs in Finland with her taking part on seven dates in December 2018 and on eight dates in December 2019.

Ryd is featured on "Lucky Star" from the 2020 self-titled debut album of Amahiru, a musical project led by Frédéric Leclercq and Saki. In the studio album Hørizøns by Beyond the Black in 2020, Ryd was featured in the song "Wounded Healer". Ryd will also be featured on the new Mirka Rantanen's heavy metal project Circus Of Rock.

=== Awards ===
==== 2012 ====
- Bandit Rock Awards together with Amaranthe "This year's Swedish breakthrough".

==== 2013 ====
- Gold Disc with Amaranthe "Hunger".
- Gold Disc with Amaranthe "Amaranthine".
- Platinum Disc together with Raskasta Joulua.

==== 2014 ====
- Platinum Disc with Raskasta Joulua 2.
- Bandit Rock "Rock & Role Model".

==== 2015 ====
- Playboy Magazine "The 14 hottest Metal Maidens in face-melting History".
- Gold disc with Amaranthe for the album Nexus in Finland

==== 2017 ====
- Three Gold disc with Amaranthe for album Amaranthe, album Nexus and single "Nexus
- Gold disc with Amaranthe for the single "1000000 Lightyears"
- Gold disc with Amaranthe for "Massive Addictive"

==== 2018 ====
- Gold disc with Amaranthe for album Maximalism

== Discography ==
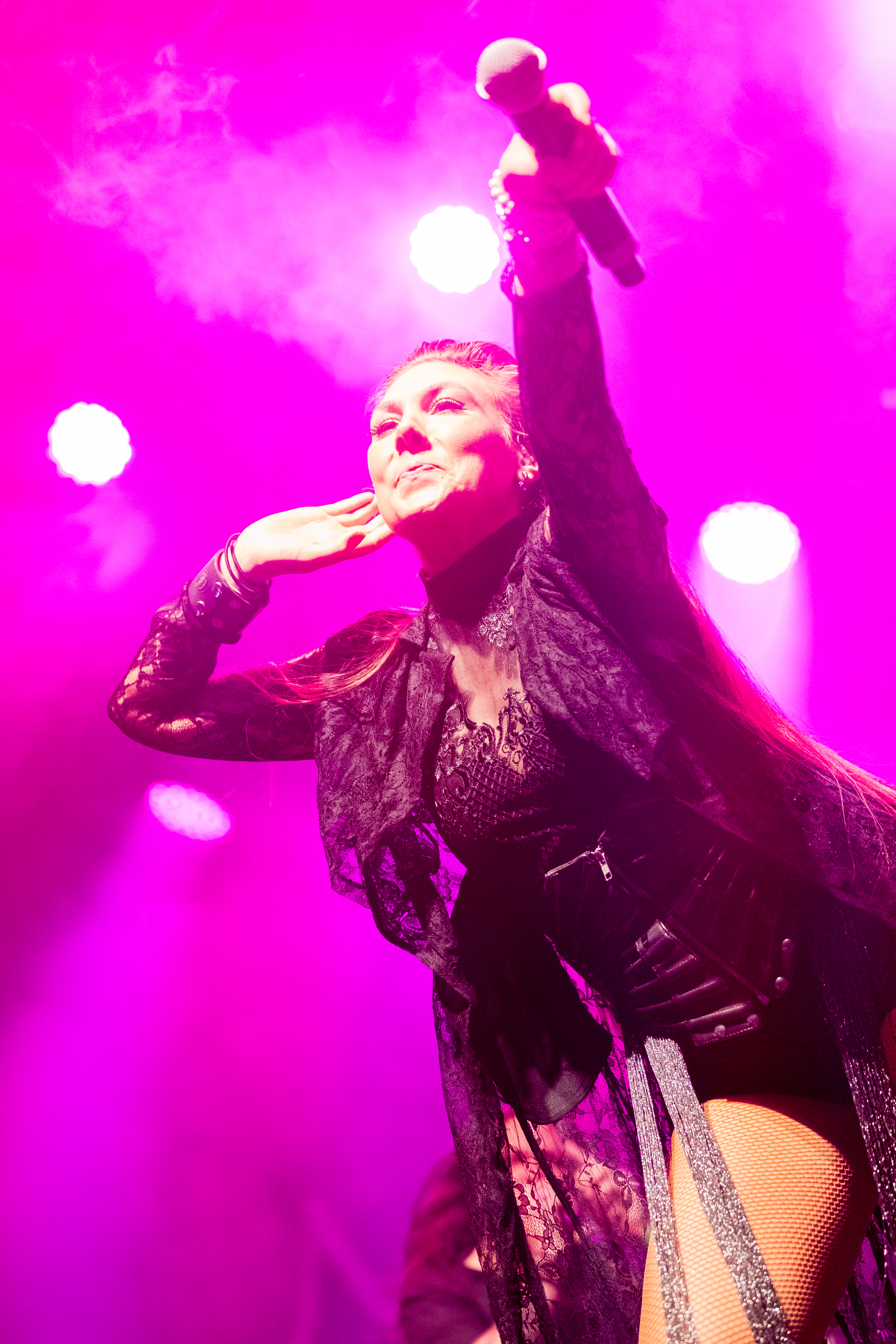
Ryd in 2019

=== Amaranthe ===
Studio albums:

- Amaranthe (2011)
- The Nexus (2013)
- Massive Addictive (2014)
- Maximalism (2016)
- Helix (2018)
- Manifest (2020)
- The Catalyst (2024)

EPs:

- Leave Everything Behind (2009)

=== Timo Tolkki's Avalon ===
Studio albums:

- The Land of New Hope (2013)
- Angels of the Apocalypse (2014)

=== Raskasta Joulua ===
Studio albums:

- Raskasta Joulua (2013)
- Rakgnarok Juletide (2014)
- Raskasta Joulua IV (2017)
- Viides adventti (2022)
