= Razorblade =

Razorblade may refer to:

- "Razorblade", song from the 2003 album History for Sale by Blue October
- Razorblade Romance, an album by Finnish rock band HIM
- Razorblade Suitcase, an album by UK post-grunge band Bush
- "Razorblade", a song from American rock band The Strokes' album First Impressions of Earth
- Razor, a bladed tool primarily used for shaving
- "Razorblade", song from the 2013 album The Nexus by Amaranthe
