= Disarmonia Mundi =

Italian melodic death metal band

- Origin: Avigliana, Italy
- Genres: Melodic death metal
- Years active: 1999−present
- Labels: Scarlet, Coroner
- Members: Ettore Rigotti; Claudio Ravinale
- Past members: Mirco Andreis; Benny Bianco Chinto; Simone Palermiti; Federico Cagliero
- Website: disarmoniamundi.com

Disarmonia Mundi is an Italian melodic death metal band from Avigliana. Producer and multi-instrumentalist Ettore Rigotti started the project, which is known for featuring Soilwork's vocalist Björn "Speed" Strid as guest vocalist on several albums. After releasing two albums under Scarlet Records, they published all further work under their own record label, Coroner Records.

== History ==
=== Formation and first three albums ===
Ettore Rigotti founded Disarmonia Mundi in 1999. The band went through several line-up changes before recording their debut album, Nebularium. Rigotti self-produced the album in his home studio. The response to the album allowed the band to sign a contract with Self for Italian distribution and with Cd-Maximum for distribution in Russia. Line-up problems prevented live performances to support Nebularium and slowed down the recording of the forthcoming album.

The only members remaining from the former line-up, Rigotti and Mirco Andreis, were joined by Claudio Ravinale. The resulting promo helped Disarmonia Mundi sign a recording contract with Scarlet Records.

Rigotti contacted Soilwork front man Björn "Speed" Strid. What started out as a guest appearance on a track for the album Fragments of D-Generation, turned into Strid performing guest vocals on most songs on the album. Fragments of D-Generation met positive feedback. While Strid returned to work on Soilwork's Stabbing the Drama, Rigotti and Ravinale began composing the music and lyrics for their third album.

While they worked on the new record, Andreis left the band to focus on other activities unrelated to music. The remaining members tracked most of the album in three weeks. The band remained a duo for the recording of Mind Tricks while having Strid guest on vocals, splitting them equally with Ravinale, with Rigotti contributing clean vocals. During the recording, ex-member Andreis shot a video for the band's single "Celestial Furnace".

=== The Isolation Game ===
The Isolation Game was released 9 December 2009. Strid performed guest vocals on a few songs while Ravinale handled the majority of the harsh vocals. Guitarist Olof Mörck of Nightrage and Amaranthe performed a guest solo on one song.

On 12 November 2008, the band announced on their MySpace, "We have finished the pre-production of our forthcoming fourth album entitled "The Isolation Game" scheduled for an early spring release. News about the label for this album will be revealed very soon." The label was revealed to be Coroner Records, a new record label based out of Italy. The recording took place at Rigotti's "The Metal House" studios in Italy. Strid (Soilwork, Terror 2000) recorded vocals for a few songs on The Isolation Game. Like on Mind Tricks, The Isolation Game features more singing from Rigotti and Ravinale. Upon release, The Isolation Game received positive reviews, cementing the band's reputation with songs like "Perdition Haze," "Stepchild Of Laceration" and the title track becoming fan favorites.

Before the release of The Isolation Game, Disarmonia Mundi released a remastered edition of their debut album, Nebularium, in double disc packaging, with the second disc containing six songs that were b-sides to album recording sessions. The second disc was called The Restless Memoirs EP. The re-release package was published by Coroner Records on 26 June 2009.

=== Cold Inferno and The Dormant Stranger ===
Following the 16 March 2015 announcement, the band's next album, Cold Inferno, was released on 9 June 2015. Like on The Isolation Game, Ravinale handled the majority of vocals, with Rigotti providing clean vocals, and Strid guesting on a couple of tracks, while Rigotti recorded and produced all the instrumental parts at The Metal House studio.

On 21 February 2025, it was announced that the band's new album, The Dormant Stranger, would be released the following month on 21 March 2025, their first album in a decade since Cold Inferno.

The Dormant Stranger met generally positive reviews and enthusiasm from fans, showcasing the classic Swedish melodeath sound the band has proposed since "Fragments Of D-Generation" onwards.

=== Side Projects ===
On 10 November 2011, Rigotti and Ravinale announced on their Myspace page that they had formed a new band with NeroArgento and American professional skateboarder Elliot Sloan, called The Stranded. On 2 July 2012, The Stranded released the album Survivalism Boulevard on Coroner Records. This album has met generally positive feedback. After the first album, the band has not given any more signs of life and there is no further news regarding a possible continuation of the activity.

Over the years singer Claudio Ravinale has formed several side projects. The industrial metal band The Silverblack with producer and multi-instrumentalist NeroArgento which released the following albums: "The Silverblack" (2014), "The Grand Turmoil" (2015), "Rain On A Wedding Day" (2018), "Prototype 6:17" (2019), "Judgment" (2022) and "Serenades Of Hate" (2024). The horror metal band Infernalizer which released two albums: "The Ugly Truth" (2021) and "After Dark" (2023) and the horror punk metal band 5 Star Grave which recorded three albums "Corpse Breed Syndrome" (2008), "Drugstore Hell" (2012) and "The Red Room" (2017) before suspending their activity indefinitely.

== Band members ==
=== Current members ===
- Ettore Rigotti − guitars, drums, keyboards, clean vocals (1999–present) bass (2005–present)
- Claudio Ravinale − extreme vocals, lyrics (2004–present)

=== Session members ===
- Björn "Speed" Strid − vocals

=== Former members ===
- Mirco Andreis − bass guitar (1999–2005)
- Benny Bianco Chinto − vocals, lyrics (1999–2002)
- Simone Palermiti − guitar, songwriting (1999–2002)
- Federico Cagliero − guitar, songwriting (2001)

Timeline

== Discography ==
=== Studio albums ===
- Nebularium (2001)
- Fragments of D-Generation (2004)
- Mind Tricks (2006)
- The Isolation Game (2009)
- Cold Inferno (2015)
- The Dormant Stranger (2025)

=== Miscellaneous ===
- Nebularium + The Restless Memoirs (EP, 2009)
- Perdition Haze (single, 2009)
- Princess Ghibli (split, 2011)
- Princess Ghibli 2 (split, 2012)
- Love (Feelingless) (feature, 2022)
- Oathbreaker (single, 2024)
- Adrift Among Insignificant Strangers (single, 2025)

== Videography ==
- "Red Clouds" from Fragments of D-Generation
- "Celestial Furnace" from Mind Tricks
