= Renegade Five =

Swedish rock band

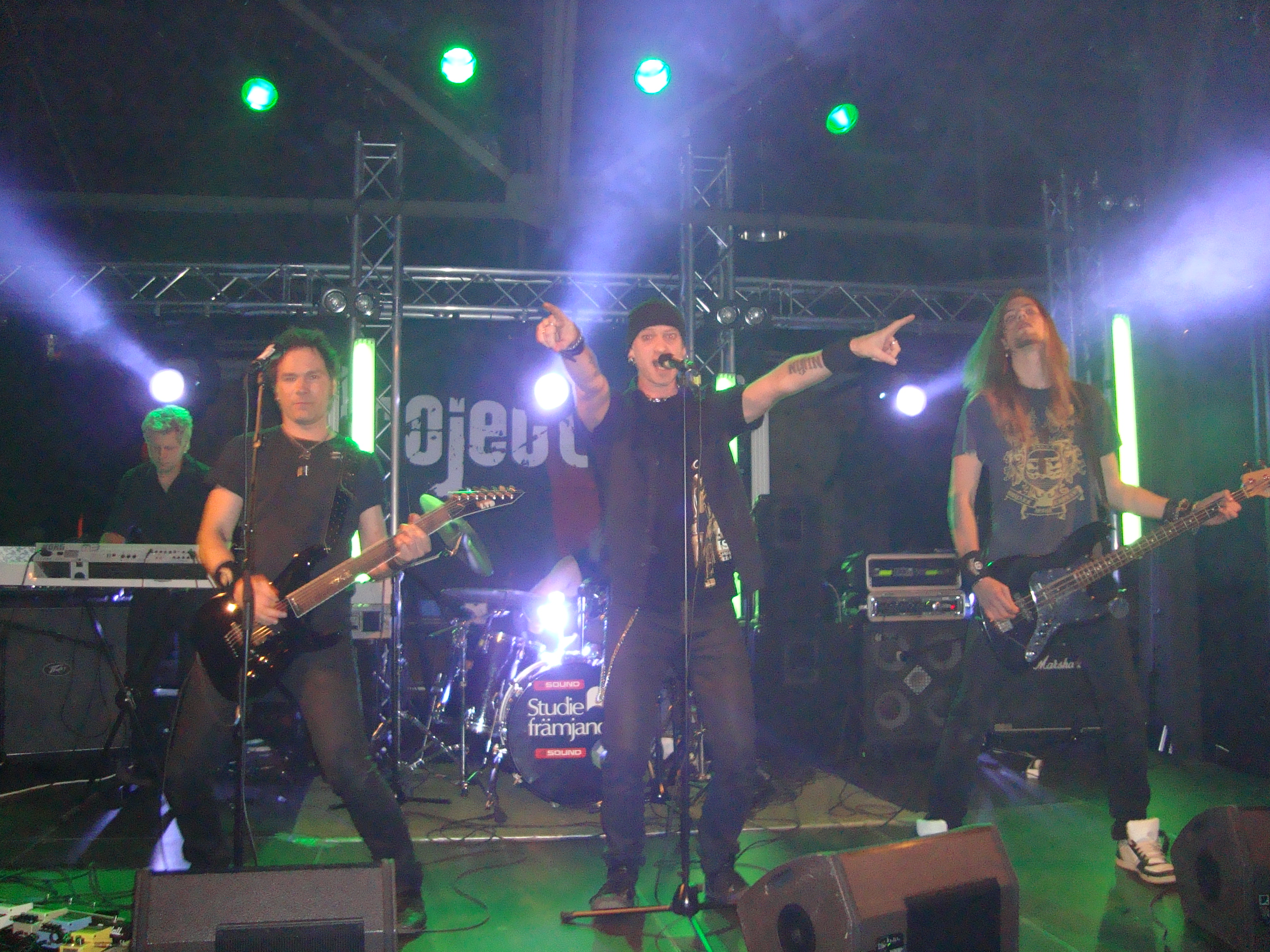
- Renegade Five in 2009

Background information
- Origin: Karlstad, Sweden
- Genres: Rock
- Years active: 2005 – present
- Labels: Bonnier Amigo
- Members: Anders Fernette; Håkan Fredriksson; Per Lidén; Marcus Nowak; Jimmy Lundin
- Past members: Daniel Johansson; Per Nylin; Peter Damin; Harry Kjörsvik
- Website: www.renegadefive.com

Renegade Five is a Swedish rock band from Karlstad, Sweden. It consists of Anders Fernette (vocals), Håkan Fredriksson (keyboard), Per Lidén (guitar), Jimmy Lundin (bass) and Marcus Nowak (drums). The band formed in 2005 and is currently signed to Bonnier Amigo.

Their first single, "Shadows", was released in early 2008, followed by their debut album, Undergrounded Universe, a year later.

The band was nominated for a Grammis in 2010.

On 5 May 2011, Renegade Five published a new single: "Alive". In April 2012 they released their newest album, NXT GEN.

== Discography ==
=== Albums ===
- Undergrounded Universe (February, 2009)

All lyrics are written by Per Lidén.

No.	Title	Length
1.	"Memories"	3:31
2.	"Running In Your Veins"	3:16
3.	"Darkest Age"	4:10
4.	"Save My Soul"	3:52
5.	"Shadows"	3:47
6.	"Stand For Your Rights"	3:40
7.	"Love Will Remain"	3:48
8.	"Loosing Your Senses [sic]"	3:27
9.	"When You're Gone"	3:25
10.	"Seven Days"	3:45
11.	"Too Far Away"	3:08
12.	"Set My Heart On Fire"	4:13

- Life Is Already Fading (September 21, 2011)

No.	Title	Length
1.	"Life Is Already Fading (ft. Elize Ryd from Amaranthe)"	3:31
2.	"Alive"	3:50
3.	"Bring It On"	3:44
4.	"Lost Without Your Love"	3:35

- Nxt Gen (April, 2012)

No.	Title	Length
1.	"The Next Generation"	4:06
2.	"Erase Me"	4:00
3.	"Alive"	3:47
4.	"This Pain Will Do Me Good"	3:55
5.	"Life Is Already Fading"	3:27
6.	"Bring It On"	3:44
7.	"Save Me"	4:00
8.	"When We Say Goodbye"	3:52
9.	"Win This Race"	3:57
10.	"Before Midnight"	4:22
11.	"Turn The Wheel"	3:42
12.	"Lost Without Your Love"	3:35
13.	"Running In Your Veins (Acoustic Version)"	3:22

=== Singles ===
- "Shadows" (September, 2007)
- "Love Will Remain" (January, 2008)
- "Running In Your Veins" (March, 2008)
- "Darkest Age" (September, 2008)
- "Save My Soul" (January, 2009)
- "Alive" (April 29, 2011)
- "Life is Already Fading" (September 21, 2011)
- "This Pain Will Do Me Good" (February, 2012)
- "Surrender" (March, 2012)
- "Erase Me" (January, 2013)
- "Bring Me Back to Life" (September, 2015)
- "Sorry" (May, 2018)
