= The Isolation Game =

Studio album by Disarmonia Mundi
- Released: 9 December 2009
- Recorded: The Metal House Studio
- Genre: Melodic death metal
- Label: Coroner Records
- Producer: Ettore Rigotti

Disarmonia Mundi chronology
Mind Tricks (2006)	The Isolation Game (2009)	Cold Inferno (2015)

The Isolation Game is the fourth full-length studio album by the Italian melodic death metal band Disarmonia Mundi, released on 9 December 2009 by Coroner Records. It features guest appearances by Björn "Speed" Strid of Soilwork and Olof Mörck of Nightrage/Dragonland/Amaranthe. The cover art is by French artist Trëz Orb.

The album was rated a 7 out of 10 by Yiannis Dafopoulos of Metal Temple Magazine.

== Track listing ==
1. "Cypher Drone" – 4:29
2. "Structural Wound" – 3:18
3. "Perdition Haze" – 4:20
4. "Building an Empire of Dust" – 4:23
5. "Stepchild of Laceration" – 5:01
6. "The Isolation Game" – 4:05
7. "Blacklight Rush" – 3:47
8. "Glimmer" – 2:01
9. "Ties That Bind" – 4:05
10. "Losing Ground" – 4:14
11. "Same Old Nails for a New Messiah" – 3:58
12. "Digging the Grave of Silence" – 4:18
13. "Beneath a Colder Sun" – 1:25
14. "The Shape of Things to Come" (Japanese bonus track) – 4:10

== Personnel ==
=== Disarmonia Mundi ===
- Ettore Rigotti – guitar, bass, drums, keyboards, clean vocals
- Claudio Ravinale − death vocals, lyrics

=== Guests ===
- Björn "Speed" Strid – guest vocals on tracks 1, 2, 6, 7, 9, 11, and 14
- Olof Mörck – guitar solos on tracks 5 and 10
