= The Dormant Stranger =

Studio album by Disarmonia Mundi
- Released: 21 March 2025
- Recorded: 2024
- Genre: Melodic death metal
- Length: 55:23
- Label: Coroner Records
- Producer: Ettore Rigotti

Disarmonia Mundi chronology
Cold Inferno (2015)	The Dormant Stranger (2025)

Singles from The Dormant Stranger
- 1. "Oathbreaker" Released: November 23, 2024; 2. "Crossroads To Eternity" Released: February 23, 2025

Professional ratings
Review scores
Source	Rating
Dead Rhetoric	9.5/10
Distorted Sound	7/10

The Dormant Stranger is the sixth full-length studio album by Italian melodic death metal band Disarmonia Mundi, released on 21 March 2025, their first album in a decade since Cold Inferno.

== Track listing ==
1. "Adrift Among Insignificant Strangers" – 6:48
2. "Oathbreaker" – 5:11
3. "Shadows of a World Painted Red" – 4:39
4. "Illusion of Control" – 4:48
5. "Outcast" – 4:38
6. "Warhound" – 5:06
7. "Crossroads to Eternity" – 4:14
8. "8th Circle" – 6:39
9. "The Dormant Stranger" – 4:42
10. "Architects of Negativity" – 4:49
11. "Sheer Nothing" (bonus track) – 3:49

== Personnel ==
- Ettore Rigotti – guitar, bass, drums, keyboards, clean vocals
- Claudio Ravinale − death vocals, lyrics
- Björn "Speed" Strid – additional clean/death vocals
