= 5 Star Grave =

Italian heavy metal band

5 Star Grave is an Italian heavy metal band formed in 2005 and currently signed to Sliptrick Records. As of 2017, they have released three albums, one EP, and one single.

== History ==
The band was founded as Ground Zero by Thierry Bertone and Gabriele Lingua in 2005. Soon afterwards, Alessandro Blengino, Hervè De Zulian, Claudio Ravinale (Disarmonia Mundi), and Andrea Minolfi joined the band.

Ground Zero recorded the EP The Zero Hour in 2006.

In 2007, they changed their name to 5 Star Grave. The following year, they recorded and self-produced their first album, Corpse Breed Syndrome.

In 2010, the band released a cover version of "Pet Sematary" by the Ramones.

In 2011, they recorded their second album, Drugstore Hell. It was mixed by Tobias Lindell and mastered by Dragan Tanaskovic at Bohus Sound Studios in Gothenburg, Sweden. Later that year, the band signed with Massacre Records and Drugstore Hell was released on 25 May 2012.
A review stated that the album combines "extreme vocal aggression with catchy light-hearted melodies, a pounding rhythm section mixed with industrial keyboards and a sharp guitar work, all merged together in a boiling high-octane cauldron".

In September 2017, the band released The Red Room for Sliptrick Records.

== Members ==
=== Current members ===
- Claudio Ravinale – vocals (2005–present)
- Andrea Minolfi – bass and vocals (2005–present)
- Thierry Bertone – guitars (2005–present)
- Alessandro Blengino – guitars (2005–present)
- Hervè De Zulian – synth (2005–present)
- Domenico Fazzari – drums (2015–present)

=== Former Member ===
- Roberto Gaia – drums (2012–2015)
- Gabriele Lingua – drums (2005–2012)

== Discography ==
=== Studio albums ===
- Corpse Breed Syndrome (self-produced, 2008)
- Drugstore Hell (Massacre Records, 2012)
- The Red Room (Sliptrick Records, 2017)

=== EPs ===
- The ZERO Hour (self-produced, 2006, still under the name Ground Zero)

=== Singles ===
- "Pet Sematary" (self-produced, 2010)
