= Fragments of D-Generation =

Studio album by Disarmonia Mundi
- Released: 17 May 2004
- Recorded: January 2004
- Studio: dB Studio
- Genre: Melodic death metal
- Length: 46:34
- Label: Scarlet Records
- Producer: Ettore Rigotti

Disarmonia Mundi chronology
Nebularium (2001)	Fragments of D-Generation (2004)	Mind Tricks (2006)

Fragments of D-Generation is the second album by the Italian melodic death metal band Disarmonia Mundi, released by Scarlet Records in 2004. After numerous lineup changes, the album features Soilwork's Björn "Speed" Strid on vocals.

== Track listing ==
No.	Title	Length
1.	"Common State of Inner Violence"	5:19
2.	"Morgue of Centuries"	4:18
3.	"Red Clouds"	5:20
4.	"Quicksand Symmetry"	4:37
5.	"Swallow the Flames"	3:48
6.	"Oceangrave"	4:05
7.	"A Mirror Behind"	5:35
8.	"Come Forth My Dreadful One"	4:14
9.	"Shattered Lives and Broken Dreams"	4:15
10.	"Colors of a New Era"	4:59

=== Japanese bonus track ===
No.	Title	Length
11.	"Burning Cells"	4:39

Notes

1. This song is from Nebularium.

== Credits ==
=== Disarmonia Mundi ===
- Speed Strid − harsh lead vocals
- Claudio Ravinale − harsh backing vocals, & lyrics
- Willy Barbero − lead guitar
- Ettore Rigotti − rhythm guitar; co-clean vocals on (2, 6, 8, & 9), keyboards, & drums
- Mirco Andreis − bass guitar; music video director on "Red Clouds"

=== Additional personnel ===
- Guido Suardi – artwork, all photography and retouching
- Benny Bianco Chinto – clean vocals on (1, 3, 4, 7, & 10), & lyrics
- Federico Cagliero – songwriting on (3, 4, 10), guitar solos on (11)
- Samantha Abbatangelo – layout, art direction, design and retouching
- Göran Finnberg – mastering
- Alessandro Vanara – mixing
