= Massive Addictive =

Studio album by Amaranthe
- Released: 15 October 2014
- Recorded: 27 April – 12 June 2014
- Studio: Hansen (Ribe, Denmark); Gothenburg Rock (Gothenburg, Sweden); Amaranthe (Los Angeles)
- Genre: Melodic death metal; power metal; pop metal; EDM
- Length: 41:03
- Label: Spinefarm
- Producer: Jacob Hansen

Amaranthe chronology
The Nexus (2013)	Massive Addictive (2014)	Maximalism (2016)

Singles from Massive Addictive
- 1. "Drop Dead Cynical" Released: 16 September 2014; 2. "Trinity" Released: 29 September 2014; 3. "Dynamite" Released: 13 October 2014; 4. "Digital World" Released: 11 May 2015; 5. "True" Released: 30 October 2015

Professional ratings
Review scores
Source	Rating
BraveWords	8.5/10
Metal Hammer (GER)	4.0/7
Metal Hammer (UK)	2.5/5 stars
Metal Temple	10/10

Massive Addictive (stylized in all caps) is the third studio album by Swedish heavy metal band Amaranthe. It is also the first album with Henrik Englund on harsh vocals, replacing former unclean vocalist Andy Solveström, who left the band in 2013.

== Track listing ==
Massive Addictive – Standard edition
No.	Title	Lyrics	Music	Length
1.	"Dynamite"	Jake E; Olof Mörck; Elize Ryd	Mörck; Ryd	3:14
2.	"Drop Dead Cynical"	Jake E; Mörck; Ryd	Mörck; Ryd; Jake E	3:17
3.	"Trinity"	Jake E; Mörck; Ryd	Mörck; Ryd	3:11
4.	"Massive Addictive"	Jake E; Mörck; Ryd	Mörck; Ryd; Jake E	3:29
5.	"Digital World"	Jake E; Mörck; Ryd	Mörck; Jake E; Ryd	3:17
6.	"True"	Jake E; Mörck	Mörck; Ryd	3:30
7.	"Unreal"	Jake E; Mörck; Ryd	Mörck; Ryd; Jake E	3:36
8.	"Over and Done"	Mörck; Jake E	Mörck	3:38
9.	"Danger Zone"	Jake E; Mörck	Mörck; Jake E; Ryd	3:01
10.	"Skyline"	Jake E; Mörck; Ryd	Mörck; Jake E; Ryd	3:39
11.	"An Ordinary Abnormality"	Jake E; Mörck	Mörck; Jake E	3:28
12.	"Exhale"	Jake E; Mörck	Mörck; Jake E	3:43
Total length:				41:03

Massive Addictive – Japanese edition (bonus tracks)
No.	Title	Length
13.	"Trinity" (acoustic)	3:19
14.	"True" (acoustic)	3:22
Total length:		47:44

Massive Addictive – Spotify edition (bonus track)
No.	Title	Lyrics	Music	Length
13.	"1.000.000 Lightyears" (live)	Mörck; Ryd; Jake E; Andy Solveström	Mörck; Ryd	3:26
Total length:				44:29

== Personnel ==
=== Amaranthe ===
- Jake E – clean vocals (male)
- Elize Ryd – clean vocals (female)
- Olof Mörck – guitars, keyboards, programming
- Johan Andreassen – bass
- Morten Løwe Sørensen – drums
- Henrik Englund – harsh vocals

=== Production ===
- Jacob Hansen – production, engineering, mixing, mastering
- Olof Mörck – co-production, mixing
- Jake E – mixing

=== Guest musicians ===
- Elias Holmlid – keyboards on "Over and Done"
- Michael Vahl – additional vocals on "An Ordinary Abnormality"

=== Miscellaneous ===
- Gustavo Sazes – artwork, cover art
- Jonas Haagensen – studio assistant
- Daniel Antonsson (Dimension Zero, ex-Dark Tranquillity, ex-Soilwork) – recording (guitars)
- Patric Ullaeus – photography

== Charts ==
Chart (2014)	Peak position
Belgian Albums (Ultratop Flanders)	194
Finnish Albums (Suomen virallinen lista)	6
German Albums (Offizielle Top 100)	89
Japanese Albums (Oricon)	14
Swedish Albums (Sverigetopplistan)	18
Swiss Albums (Schweizer Hitparade)	53
UK Rock & Metal Albums (OCC)	10
US Billboard 200	105
US Top Rock Albums (Billboard)	25
US Top Hard Rock Albums (Billboard)	3
US Heatseekers Albums (Billboard)	1
