= Maximalism (album) =

Studio album by Amaranthe
- Released: October 21, 2016
- Recorded: April 18 – August 3, 2016
- Studio: Top Floor (Gothenburg, Sweden); Hansen (Ribe, Denmark); Amaranthe (Los Angeles)
- Genre: Melodic death metal; power metal; EDM; trance
- Length: 39:42
- Label: Spinefarm
- Producer: Jacob Hansen

Amaranthe chronology
Massive Addictive (2014)	Maximalism (2016)	Helix (2018)

Singles from Maximalism
- 1. "That Song" Released: September 21, 2016; 2. "Fury" Released: October 7, 2016; 3. "Boomerang" Released: January 9, 2017; 4. "Maximize" Released: August 29, 2017

Professional ratings
Review scores
Source	Rating
AudioVein Entertainment	4/5 stars
BraveWords	7.5/10
Metal Hammer (GER)	2/7
Metal Hammer (UK)	2.5/5 stars
Metal Temple	10/10
The Soundboard	5/10
We Love Metal	10/10

Maximalism (stylized in all caps) is the fourth studio album by Swedish heavy metal band Amaranthe. It is also the final album to feature vocalist and co-founder Jake E. It was recorded between April 18 and August 3, 2016 and released on October 21 the same year.

== Track listing ==
Maximalism – Standard edition
No.	Title	Lyrics	Music	Length
1.	"Maximize"	Olof Mörck; Elize Ryd; Jake E	Mörck; Ryd	3:10
2.	"Boomerang"	Mörck; Ryd; Jake E	Mörck; Ryd	3:22
3.	"That Song"	Mörck; Ryd; Jake E	Ryd; Mörck	3:13
4.	"21"	Ryd; Mörck; Jake E	Mörck; Ryd; Jake E	3:05
5.	"On the Rocks"	Mörck; Ryd; Jake E	Mörck; Ryd; Jake E	3:09
6.	"Limitless"	Ryd; Mörck; Jake E	Ryd; Mörck	3:10
7.	"Fury"	Jake E; Ryd; Mörck; Henrik Englund	Ryd; Mörck	2:58
8.	"Faster"	Jake E	Jake E; Mörck; Ryd	3:25
9.	"Break Down and Cry"	Jake E	Jake E; Mörck; Morten Løwe Sørensen	3:56
10.	"Supersonic"	Ryd; Mörck; Jake E	Ryd; Mörck; Jake E	3:17
11.	"Fireball"	Mörck; Ryd; Jake E	Mörck; Ryd; Jake E	3:14
12.	"Endlessly"	Ryd; Mörck	Ryd; Mörck	3:43
Total length:				39:42

Maximalism – Japanese edition (bonus tracks)
No.	Title	Lyrics	Music	Length
13.	"Burn with Me" (live in O2 Islington, London 2014)	Jake E; Mörck	Mörck; Jake E; Ryd	4:15
14.	"1.000.000 Lightyears" (live in O2 Islington, London 2014)	Mörck; Ryd; Jake E; Andy Solveström	Mörck; Ryd	3:24
15.	"Leave Everything Behind" (live in O2 Islington, London 2014)	Jake E; Mörck	Mörck; Jake E	3:26
Total length:				50:47

== Personnel ==
=== Amaranthe ===
- Elize Ryd – clean vocals (female)
- Jake E – clean vocals (male)
- Olof Mörck – guitars, keyboards, programming, co-producer, mixing
- Johan Andreassen – bass
- Morten Løwe Sørensen – drums
- Henrik Englund – harsh vocals

=== Production ===
- Jacob Hansen – producer, engineer, mixing, mastering
- Jakob Herrmann – co-producer, engineer

=== Miscellaneous ===
- Mattias Bylund – strings on "Endlessly"
- Michael Bohlin – mixing of Japanese bonus tracks
- Gustavo Sazes – artwork
- Patric Ullaeus – photography
- Jonas Haagensen – studio assistant & co-engineering
- Christoffer Borg – studio assistant & co-engineering

== Charts ==
Chart (2016)	Peak position
Belgian Albums (Ultratop Flanders)	94
Canadian Albums (Billboard)	91
Finnish Albums (Suomen virallinen lista)	3
German Albums (Offizielle Top 100)	84
Japanese Albums (Oricon)	24
Swedish Albums (Sverigetopplistan)	4
Swiss Albums (Schweizer Hitparade)	44
UK Rock & Metal Albums (OCC)	11
US Billboard 200	169
US Top Rock Albums (Billboard)	25
US Top Hard Rock Albums (Billboard)	6
US Heatseekers Albums (Billboard)	1
