= Cold Inferno =

Studio album by Disarmonia Mundi
- Released: 9 June 2015
- Genre: Melodic death metal
- Label: Coroner Records
- Producer: Ettore Rigotti

Disarmonia Mundi chronology
| The Isolation Game (2009) | Cold Inferno (2015) | The Dormant Stranger (2025) |

Cold Inferno is the fifth full-length studio album by the Italian melodic death metal band Disarmonia Mundi, released on 9 June 2015.

Katarina McGinn of Dead Rhetoric rated it a 9.5 out of 10.

== Track listing ==
1. "Creation Dirge" – 5:28
2. "Stormghost" – 4:24
3. "Behind Closed Doors" – 3:16
4. "Coffin" – 4:01
5. "Oddities from the Ravishing Chasm" – 7:20
6. "Slaves to the Illusion of Life" – 3:35
7. "Blessing from Below" – 4:45
8. "Magma Diver" – 3:55
9. "Clay of Hate" – 4:11
10. "Toys of Acceleration" – 4:49
11. "The Loneliness of the Long Distance Runner" (feat. Christian Älvestam; Iron Maiden cover; Japanese bonus track) – 6:22

== Personnel ==
Disarmonia Mundi

- Ettore Rigotti – guitar, bass, drums, keyboards, clean vocals
- Claudio Ravinale − death vocals, lyrics

Musical guests

- Björn "Speed" Strid – vocals
- Christian Älvestam – co-vocals (track 11)
