= Amaranthe (album) =

Studio album by Amaranthe
- Released: April 11, 2011
- Recorded: October 6 – December 4, 2010
- Studio: Hansen (Ribe, Denmark); Amaranthe (Gothenburg, Sweden)
- Genre: Power metal; metalcore; melodic death metal
- Length: 42:49
- Label: Spinefarm
- Producer: Jacob Hansen

Amaranthe chronology
Leave Everything Behind (2009)	Amaranthe (2011)	The Nexus (2013)

Singles from Amaranthe
- 1. "Hunger" Released: March 1, 2011; 2. "Rain" Released: June 13, 2011; 3. "Amaranthine" Released: July 27, 2011; 4. "1.000.000 Lightyears" Released: May 21, 2012

Professional ratings
Review scores
Source	Rating
AllMusic	3.5/5 stars
Jukebox: Metal	4/5 stars
Global Domination	7/10 stars
Sea of Tranquility	4/5 stars

Amaranthe is the debut studio album by Swedish heavy metal band Amaranthe. The album was released April 11, 2011 and reached #35 and #16 on the Swedish and Finnish charts respectively. It also topped the Japanese Import charts beating Lady Gaga. A deluxe edition was released in October 2011, featuring two bonus tracks and a DVD.

== Track listing ==
Amaranthe – Standard edition
No.	Title	Lyrics	Music	Length
1.	"Leave Everything Behind"	Jake E; Olof Mörck	Mörck; Jake E	3:17
2.	"Hunger"	Jake E; Mörck; Andy Solveström	Mörck; Jake E; Elize Ryd; Solveström	3:12
3.	"1.000.000 Lightyears"	Mörck; Ryd; Jake E; Solveström	Mörck; Ryd	3:15
4.	"Automatic"	Mörck; Jake E; Ryd; Solveström	Mörck; Ryd	3:24
5.	"My Transition"	Mörck; Jake E	Mörck	3:49
6.	"Amaranthine"	Jake E; Mörck; Solveström	Mörck; Jake E	3:29
7.	"Rain"	Jake E; Mörck	Mörck; Jake E	3:44
8.	"Call Out My Name"	Jake E; Mörck	Mörck; Jake E	3:16
9.	"Enter the Maze"	Jake E; Mörck	Mörck; Jake E	4:04
10.	"Director's Cut"	Jake E; Mörck	Mörck; Jake E	4:49
11.	"Act of Desperation"	Mörck	Mörck; Ryd	3:04
12.	"Serendipity"	Mörck; Ryd; Jake E; Solveström	Mörck; Ryd	3:26
Total length:				42:49

Amaranthe – Japanese standard and European special editions (bonus tracks)
No.	Title	Lyrics	Music	Length
13.	"Breaking Point"	Jake E; Mörck; Ryd; Solveström	Mörck; Ryd	3:41
14.	"A Splinter in My Soul"	Jake E; Mörck; Solveström	Mörck; Jake E	3:44
Total length:				50:14

Amaranthe – Japanese deluxe and US special editions (bonus tracks)
No.	Title	Length
13.	"Breaking Point"	3:41
14.	"A Splinter in My Soul"	3:44
15.	"Amaranthine" (acoustic)	3:09
16.	"Leave Everything Behind" (acoustic)	3:18
Total length:		56:41

Amaranthe – US and European special editions (bonus DVD)
No.	Title	Director(s)	Length
1.	"Hunger" (music video)	Patric Ullaeus	3:40
2.	"Amaranthine" (music video)	Ullaeus	3:33
3.	"Behind the Scenes - The Making of Hunger"		1:19
4.	"2011 European Tour Documentary"	Johan Carlén	11:12
5.	"Album Recording Studio Diaries"	Jake E	22:06
Total length:			41:50

Amaranthe – Japanese deluxe edition (bonus DVD)
No.	Title	Director(s)	Length
1.	"Hunger" (music video)	Ullaeus	3:40
2.	"Amaranthine" (music video)	Ullaeus	3:33
3.	"Live@Brewhouse"		1:31
4.	"Live@Musikens Hus"		8:18
5.	"Behind the Scenes - The Making of Hunger"		1:19
6.	"2011 European Tour Documentary"	Carlén	11:12
7.	"Album Recording Studio Diaries"	Jake E	22:06
Total length:			51:39

=== Notes ===
- On streaming services and digital stores, "Rain" is alternatively titled "It's All About Me".

== Personnel ==
=== Amaranthe ===
- Elize Ryd – clean vocals (female)
- Jake E – clean vocals (male)
- Andy Solveström – harsh vocals
- Olof Mörck – guitars, keyboards, co-producer, mixing
- Johan Andreassen – bass
- Morten Løwe Sørensen – drums

=== Additional musicians ===
- Elias Holmlid – keyboards and arrangements on "Amaranthine"
- Pagaard Wolff – additional guitar on "Amaranthine"

=== Production ===
- Jacob Hansen – producer, engineer, mixing, mastering
- Jeppe Andersson – co-producer

== Charts ==
Chart	Peak position
Finnish Albums Chart	16
Japanese Albums Chart	39
Swedish Albums Chart	35

== Certifications ==
Region	Certification	Certified units/sales
Sweden (GLF)	Gold	20,000^{‡}
^{‡} Sales+streaming figures based on certification alone.

== Release history ==
Country	Date
Europe	13 April 2011
Japan	8 June 2011
United States	6 November 2012
