= The Catalyst (album) =

Studio album by Amaranthe
- Released: 23 February 2024
- Studio: Hansen (Ribe, Denmark); Amaranthe (Gothenburg, Sweden); iStudio (Helsinki, Finland)
- Length: 38:33
- Label: Nuclear Blast
- Producer: Jacob Hansen

Amaranthe chronology
Manifest (2020)	The Catalyst (2024)

Singles from The Catalyst
- 1. "Find Life" Released: 6 October 2022; 2. "Damnation Flame" Released: 27 June 2023; 3. "Insatiable" Released: 26 September 2023; 4. "Outer Dimensions" Released: 16 November 2023; 5. "Re-Vision" Released: 11 January 2024

The Catalyst is the seventh studio album by Swedish heavy metal band Amaranthe. The album was released on 23 February 2024 through Nuclear Blast and was produced by Jacob Hansen. It is the first album to feature Mikael Sehlin on harsh vocals.

== Background and promotion ==
On 8 June 2022, Wilhelmsson announced his exit from the band, saying that he wished to spend more time with his family and began to dislike touring over the years. He also said that he was planning on releasing solo material in the near future. The band announced they would be joined by two special guests as his replacements at their summer shows of that year. On 6 October, Amaranthe released the first single "Find Life".

On 27 June 2023, Amaranthe released the second single for "Damnation Flame", in which they revealed the identity of their new harsh vocalist, Mikael Sehlin. The band later announced the album itself and release date. On 26 September, the band unveiled the third single "Insatiable". On 16 November, they premiered the fourth single "Outer Dimensions". On 11 January 2024, Amaranthe released the fifth single "Re-Vision". The music video for the title track "The Catalyst" was released 23 February 2024, coinciding with the album release. On 24 September 2024, Amaranthe released the official video for "Interference".

== Critical reception ==
Professional ratings
Review scores
Source	Rating
Blabbermouth.net	9/10
Distorted Sound	6/10
Metal Hammer	3.5/5 stars

The album received generally positive reviews from critics. Dom Lawson from Blabbermouth.net gave the album 9 out of 10 and said: "No one does it better than Amaranthe, and The Catalyst is the greatest record they have made yet. If you need cheering up, and Satan knows most of us do, this is beyond essential listening." Phil Cooper of Distorted Sound scored the album 6 out of 10 and called the album "an excellent addition to their existing catalogue [...] but it's not an album that breaks new ground for them." Metal Hammer gave the album 3.5 out of 5 and stated: "2020's Manifest pushed their boundaries towards a heavier, djentier sound, and on their seventh album Amaranthe have glided into yet another new guise that promises to be 'more adventurous than ever'."

== Track listing ==
All tracks are written by Olof Mörck and Elize Ryd, except where noted.

Standard Edition
No.	Title	Length
1.	"The Catalyst"	3:40
2.	"Insatiable"	2:59
3.	"Damnation Flame"	3:33
4.	"Liberated"	3:06
5.	"Re-Vision"	3:04
6.	"Interference"	3:14
7.	"Stay a Little While"	3:36
8.	"Ecstasy"	2:58
9.	"Breaking the Waves"	3:18
10.	"Outer Dimensions"	3:05
11.	"Resistance"	2:56
12.	"Find Life"	3:04
Total length:		38:33

Bonus Disc and Japanese Edition
No.	Title	Writer(s)	Length
13.	"Fading Like a Flower" (Roxette cover)	Per Gessle	2:54
14.	"Insatiable" (acoustic version)		2:21
15.	"Damnation Flame" (orchestral version)		3:30
16.	"Breaking the Waves" (acoustic version)		2:44
Total length:			11:29

Japanese Edition only
No.	Title	Writer(s)	Length
17.	"The Dragonborn Comes" (Malukah cover)	Jeremy Soule and Malukah	2:03
Total length:			2:03

== Personnel ==
=== Amaranthe ===
- Olof Mörck – guitars, keyboards, synthesizers, mixing
- Elize Ryd – clean vocals (female), mixing
- Morten Løwe Sørensen – drums
- Johan Andreassen – bass
- Nils Molin – clean vocals (male), mixing
- Mikael Sehlin – unclean vocals

=== Additional musicians ===
- Alexandre Battandier – backing vocals
- Cătălina Popa-Mörck – flute

=== Additional personnel ===
- Jacob Hansen – production, engineering, mixing, mastering
- Giannis Nakos – booklet art, design
- Emmanuel Shiu – cover art

== Charts ==
Chart performance for The Catalyst
Chart (2024)	Peak position
Australian Digital Albums (ARIA)	22
Australian Physical Albums (ARIA)	71
Austrian Albums (Ö3 Austria)	9
Belgian Albums (Ultratop Wallonia)	52
Finnish Albums (Suomen virallinen lista)	21
German Albums (Offizielle Top 100)	3
Japanese Albums (Oricon)	46
Scottish Albums (OCC)	58
Swiss Albums (Schweizer Hitparade)	6
UK Album Downloads (OCC)	26
UK Independent Albums (OCC)	19
UK Rock & Metal Albums (OCC)	5
