= Mind Tricks =

Studio album by Disarmonia Mundi
- Released: 12 June 2006 (see release dates)
- Recorded: 2006 at The Metal House Studio
- Genre: Melodic death metal
- Length: 45:22
- Label: Scarlet, Coroner
- Producer: Ettore Rigotti

Disarmonia Mundi chronology
Fragments of D-Generation (2004)	Mind Tricks (2006)	The Isolation Game (2009)

Professional ratings
Review scores
Source	Rating
Metal Underground	4.5/5 stars

Mind Tricks is the third full-length studio album by the Italian melodic death metal band Disarmonia Mundi, released on 12 June 2006 by Scarlet Records. Like its predecessor, this album again features Björn "Speed" Strid on vocals, but does not feature bassist Mirco Andreis, who decided to leave the band to concentrate on his career as a video clip director. Mirco directed the video for the song "Celestial Furnace", but did not appear in the video. The music of the album was written and recorded by Ettore Rigotti in 3 weeks, with all lyrics written by Claudio Ravinale in a few days. The album features a Pantera cover version of the song "Mouth for War". The Japanese release of the album includes a bonus track from a 2002 demo entitled, "Moon of Glass". The Korean release included a bonus track entitled "Chester". The cover art features a manipulated image from the 2005 film Sin City featuring actress Makenzie Vega as a young Nancy Callahan.

== Track listing ==
1. "Resurrection Code" – 4:25
2. "Mindtricks" – 3:52
3. "Celestial Furnace" – 3:48
4. "Nihilistic Overdrive" – 4:51
5. "Parting Ways" – 4:01
6. "Venom Leech and the Hands of Rain" – 5:03
7. "Liquid Wings" – 4:36
8. "Process of Annihilation" – 3:44
9. "Last Breed" – 3:37
10. "A Taste of Collapse" – 3:33
11. "Mouth for War" (Pantera cover) – 3:52

=== Bonus tracks ===
Japanese edition
No.	Title	Length
12.	"Moon of Glass"	5:20

Korean edition
No.	Title	Length
12.	"Chester"

2011 Coroner Records reissue
No.	Title	Length
12.	"Celestial Furnace (Acoustic Version)"
13.	"Ringside Seat to Human Tragedy"
14.	"Moon of Glass"
15.	"Nihilistic Overdrive (Remix)"

== Release dates ==
Record company	Date
Scarlet	12 June 2006
Coroner	30 June 2011

== Credits ==
=== Disarmonia Mundi ===
- Ettore Rigotti − rhythm guitar, drums, keyboards, clean vocals, music, arrangements, mixing, recording, engineering, lead guitar (tracks 4–6, 8, 9, 13, 15), bass (on every song except "Moon of Glass" and "Chester")
- Claudio Ravinale − co-lead screamed vocals and lyrics (2–11, 13, 15)
- Björn "Speed" Strid − session co-lead death growls and clean vocals (except on "Ringside Seat to Human Tragedy", "Moon of Glass" and "Chester")

=== Additionnel personnel ===
==== Musical guests ====
- Claudio Strazzullo – lead guitar (tracks 1–3, 7, 10, 11)
- Samantha Abbatangelo – backing vocals (6), cover artwork, layout, art direction and design
- Christian Älvestam – co-vocals (13)
- Neroargento – remix (15)
- Benny Bianco Chinto – backing vocals (1), vocals on "Moon of Glass" and "Chester"
- Simone Palermiti – guitar on "Moon of Glass"
- Mirco Andreis – bass on "Moon of Glass" and "Chester"
- Yoko Hallelujah – backing vocals (15)

==== Other personnel ====
- Pantera – songwriting (track 11)
- Alessandro Vanara – mastering and mixing
- 奥野高久 (Takahisa Okuno) – liner notes
- Guido Suardi – band photography
- Federico Cagliero – guitars, songwriting on "Chester"
- Mike Pognant Gros – cover artwork, layout, art direction and design
