= Manifest (Amaranthe album) =

Studio album by Amaranthe
- Released: 2 October 2020
- Recorded: 16 March – 18 May 2020
- Studio: Hansen (Ribe, Denmark); Amaranthe (Gothenburg, Sweden); iStudio (Helsinki, Finland)
- Genre: Power metal; symphonic metal; pop metal; electronic metal
- Length: 40:13
- Label: Nuclear Blast
- Producer: Jacob Hansen

Amaranthe chronology
Helix (2018)	Manifest (2020)	The Catalyst (2024)

Singles from Manifest
- 1. "Viral" Released: 26 June 2020; 2. "Strong" Released: 14 August 2020; 3. "Archangel" Released: 18 September 2020; 4. "Fearless" Released: 2 October 2020; 5. "Boom!1" Released: 5 November 2020

Professional ratings
Review scores
Source	Rating
All About the Rock	7/10
Blabbermouth.net	8/10
Hysteria Magazine	7/10
Kerrang!	4/5
Metal Hammer (UK)	4/5 stars
Metal Injection	8/10

Manifest is the sixth studio album by Swedish heavy metal band Amaranthe. It was released on 2 October 2020 via Nuclear Blast.

The album features guest appearances from Noora Louhimo of Battle Beast, Perttu Kivilaakso of Apocalyptica, Elias Holmlid of Dragonland, and Heidi Shepherd of Butcher Babies.

In an interview with HeadBangers Lifestyle, the band's guitarist and keyboardist Olof Mörck revealed that the album version of "Do or Die" will only contain Nils Molin's male clean vocals and Henrik Englund Wilhemsson's unclean vocals, while the single version of the song, which will appear as a bonus track on the album, only contains Elize Ryd's female clean vocals and Angela Gossow's harsh vocals. The guitar solo by Jeff Loomis appears on both versions of the song. It is also the final album to feature Wilhemsson before his departure from the band on June 8, 2022.

== Track listing ==
All tracks are written by Olof Mörck and Elize Ryd, except where noted.

Manifest – Standard edition
No.	Title	Music	Length
1.	"Fearless"		3:31
2.	"Make It Better"		3:50
3.	"Scream My Name"		3:03
4.	"Viral"		3:01
5.	"Adrenaline"		3:09
6.	"Strong" (featuring Noora Louhimo)		3:06
7.	"The Game"		3:01
8.	"Crystalline"		3:20
9.	"Archangel"		3:23
10.	"Boom!1"	Mörck; Ryd; Henrik Englund	4:13
11.	"Die and Wake Up"		3:08
12.	"Do or Die"		3:28
Total length:			40:13

Manifest – Japanese edition (bonus track)
No.	Title	Length
13.	"Strong" (cinematic version)	3:13
Total length:		43:26

Manifest – Limited edition (bonus tracks)
No.	Title	Lyrics	Music	Length
13.	"82nd All the Way" (Sabaton cover)	Joakim Brodén; Pär Sundström	Brodén; Chris Rörland	3:21
14.	"Do or Die" (single version, featuring Angela Gossow)			3:28
15.	"Adrenaline" (Spanglish acoustic version)			2:53
16.	"Crystalline" (orchestral version)			3:19
Total length:				53:13

Manifest – Japanese deluxe edition (DVD)
No.	Title	Director(s)	Length
1.	"Do or Die" (music video)	Marcus Overbeck	4:39
2.	"Viral" (music video)	Overbeck	3:16
3.	"Manifest Studio Documentary"		15:02
Total length:			22:57

=== Notes ===
- "Boom!1" is stylized in all caps.

== Personnel ==
=== Amaranthe ===
- Olof Mörck – guitars, keyboards, synthesizers
- Elize Ryd – clean vocals (female) (Note: Backing vocals only on "Boom!1" and "Do or Die" (album version).)
- Morten Løwe Sørensen – drums
- Johan Andreassen – bass
- Henrik "GG6" Englund – unclean vocals (Note: Except "Strong", "Crystalline", "Strong" (cinematic version), "Do or Die" (single version), "Adrenalina" (acoustic version) and "Crystalline" (orchestral version).)
- Nils Molin – clean vocals (male) (Note: Except "Strong" and "Do or Die" (single version).)

=== Guest musicians ===
- Noora Louhimo (Battle Beast) – vocals on "Strong"
- Perttu Kivilaakso (Apocalyptica) – cello on "Crystalline" (both versions)
- Elias Holmlid (Dragonland) – keys on "Crystalline" (both versions)
- Heidi Shepherd (Butcher Babies) – spoken word vocals on "Boom!1"
- Jeff Loomis (ex-Arch Enemy) – guitar solo on "Do or Die" (both versions)
- Angela Gossow (ex-Arch Enemy) – harsh vocals on "Do or Die" (single version)

=== Production ===
- Jacob Hansen – producer, engineer, mixing, mastering
- Olof Mörck – co-production, mixing
- Joonas Parkkonen – engineer
- Johan Carlén – photography
- Emmanuel Shiu – album cover art
- Travis Smith – booklet art and design

== Charts ==
Chart performance for Manifest
Chart (2020)	Peak position
Austrian Albums (Ö3 Austria)	17
Belgian Albums (Ultratop Flanders)	26
Belgian Albums (Ultratop Wallonia)	56
Czech Albums (ČNS IFPI)	40
Dutch Albums (Album Top 100)	82
Finnish Albums (Suomen virallinen lista)	4
French Albums (SNEP)	152
German Albums (Offizielle Top 100)	12
Hungarian Albums (MAHASZ)	34
Scottish Albums (OCC)	43
Spanish Albums (PROMUSICAE)	55
Swedish Albums (Sverigetopplistan)	23
Swiss Albums (Schweizer Hitparade)	14
