= Olof Mörck =

Swedish guitarist

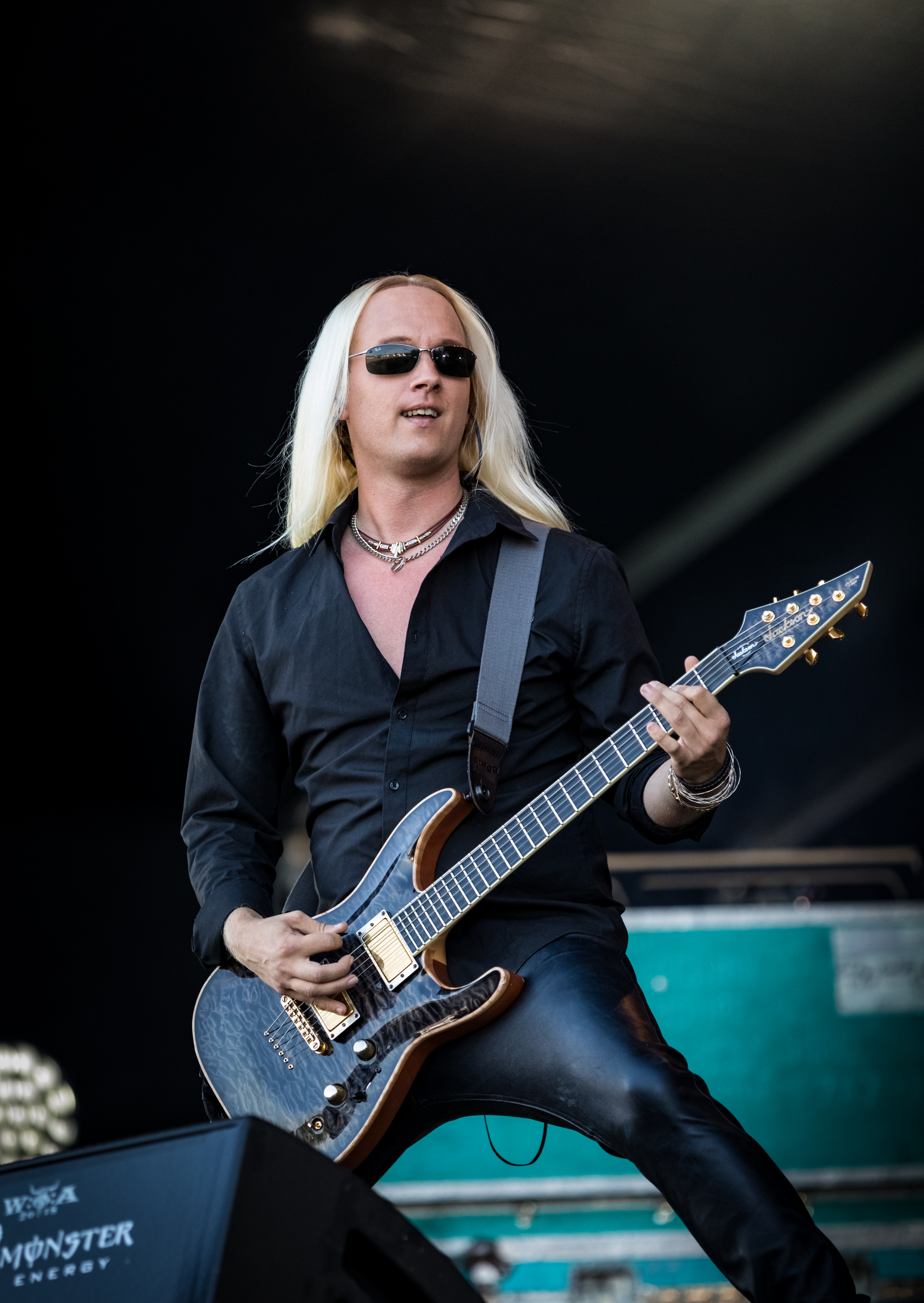
- Mörck performing in 2018

Background information
- Born: 12 December 1981 (age 44)
- Genres: Melodic death metal; power metal
- Instruments: Guitar, keyboards
- Label: Century Media

Olof Mörck (born 12 December 1981) is a Swedish musician who is the guitarist and one of the songwriters of the heavy metal band Amaranthe, as well as the former guitarist of the power metal band Dragonland. He was also a member of Nightrage between 2006 and 2011 as a guitarist. Notably, he has provided two guitar solos for the 2009 album The Isolation Game by the Italian melodic death metal band Disarmonia Mundi.

In 2010, My Darling Dismay released a video of a song with the same title. The song is more of a rock style than his previous metal projects.

Mörck appears on the 2010 album The History of Saints by the North Carolina band Vanisher, performing the solo for the song "Oceans."

Mörck provided a guest solo for Australian melodic death metal band Universum on the track, "Sum of the Universe," from their 2011 release Mortuus Machina.

Mörck also provides a guest solo for Australian power metal band Lord on an instrumental song from their 2009 release Set in Stone.

Mörck is married to Cătălina Popa from the German symphonic metal band Haggard. Their Transylvanian marriage was documented into a music video for Amaranthe's track "Endlessly", which was released on 5 March 2020.

== Gear/Endorsements ==
Guitars

- Caparison Dellinger II FX-WM Charcoal Black with EMG 81/85 pickups
- Custom Caparison Horus 27 frets
- Custom Caparison Dellinger II FX with EMG 81/85 pickups
- Caparison Horus Snow Cloud 27 frets

Amplification

- Randall V2
- Randall XL cabinet RS412XLT

Others

- Elixir and Di Marzio straps
- Korg DT-10 stage tuner
- Providence cables S-102
- BBE Green screamer overdrive
- Elixir Strings (0.10-0.64)
- Dunlop and Caparison picks (2.00 mm)

== Discography ==
=== Dragonland ===
- Storming Across Heaven (Demo) (2000)
- The Battle of the Ivory Plains (2001)
- Holy War (2002)
- Starfall (2004)
- Astronomy (2006)
- Under the Grey Banner (2011)
- The Power of the Nightstar (2022)

=== Nightrage ===
- Wearing a Martyr's Crown (2009)
- Insidious (2011)

=== Disarmonia Mundi ===
- The Isolation Game (2009)

=== Amaranthe ===
- Amaranthe (2011)
- The Nexus (2013)
- Massive Addictive (2014)
- Maximalism (2016)
- Helix (2018)
- Manifest (2020)
- The Catalyst (2024)

==== EPs ====
- Leave Everything Behind (2009)
