= Helix (Amaranthe album) =

2018 album by Amaranthe

Studio album by Amaranthe
- Released: October 19, 2018
- Recorded: March 5 – May 11, 2018
- Studio: Hansen (Ribe, Denmark); Amaranthe (Gothenburg, Sweden)
- Genre: Symphonic metal; power metal; melodic death metal; dubstep
- Length: 41:15
- Label: Spinefarm
- Producer: Jacob Hansen

Amaranthe chronology
Maximalism (2016)	Helix (2018)	Manifest (2020)

Singles from Helix
- 1. "365" Released: August 10, 2018; 2. "Countdown" Released: September 28, 2018; 3. "Inferno" Released: October 12, 2018; 4. "Dream" Released: January 10, 2019; 5. "Helix" Released: September 6, 2019; 6. "GG6" Released: November 22, 2019

Professional ratings
Review scores
Source	Rating
Blabbermouth.net	7/10
Metal Hammer (UK)	3.5/5 stars

Helix (stylized in all caps) is the fifth studio album by Swedish heavy metal band Amaranthe. It is also the first album featuring the band's new clean male vocalist Nils Molin (Dynazty), since the departure of the band's former clean male vocalist Jake E.

== Track listing ==
All lyrics are written by Elize Ryd and Olof Mörck; all music is composed by Mörck and Ryd, except where noted.

Helix – Standard edition
No.	Title	Music	Length
1.	"The Score"		3:41
2.	"365"		3:28
3.	"Inferno"		3:13
4.	"Countdown"		3:01
5.	"Helix"		3:35
6.	"Dream"		3:39
7.	"GG6"	Mörck; Henrik Englund; Ryd	3:10
8.	"Breakthrough Starshot"		3:12
9.	"My Haven"	Mörck; Ryd; Englund	3:43
10.	"Iconic"		3:12
11.	"Unified"		3:59
12.	"Momentum"		3:22
Total length:			41:15

Helix – Limited edition (bonus tracks)
No.	Title	Length
13.	"Say the Word"	2:52
14.	"Dream" (acoustic)	3:35
Total length:		47:42

Helix – Japanese edition (bonus tracks)
No.	Title	Length
13.	"Helix" (acoustic)	2:41
14.	"Unified" (acoustic)	3:20
Total length:		47:16

Helix – 2021 version
No.	Title	Length
13.	"Say the Word"	2:52
14.	"Dream" (acoustic)	3:35
15.	"Helix" (acoustic)	2:41
16.	"Unified" (acoustic)	3:20
Total length:		53:43

Helix – Japanese deluxe edition (bonus DVD)
No.	Title	Director(s)	Length
1.	"365" (music video)	Patric Ullaeus	3:30
2.	"The Making of 365"		3:54
3.	"The Making of Helix"		12:10
Total length:			19:34

== Personnel ==
Band members

- Olof Mörck – guitars, keyboards, synthesizers, programming, recording and mixing
- Elize Ryd – female clean vocals and mixing
- Morten Løwe Sørensen – drums
- Johan Andreassen – bass
- Henrik "GG6" Englund – harsh vocals
- Nils Molin – male clean vocals

Crew

- Jacob Hansen – recording, producing, mixing, mastering and engineering
- Jonas Haagensen – studio assistance and co-engineering
- Eric Bäckman – additional vocal recording
- Gustavo Sazes – cover and booklet artwork
- Linnéa Frank – photography

== Charts ==
Chart (2018)	Peak position
Austrian Albums (Ö3 Austria)	47
Belgian Albums (Ultratop Flanders)	57
Belgian Albums (Ultratop Wallonia)	101
Czech Albums (ČNS IFPI)	39
Finnish Albums (Suomen virallinen lista)	4
German Albums (Offizielle Top 100)	29
Japanese Albums (Oricon)	54
Scottish Albums (OCC)	78
Spanish Albums (PROMUSICAE)	64
Swedish Albums (Sverigetopplistan)	19
Swiss Albums (Schweizer Hitparade)	21
UK Album Downloads (OCC)	52
UK Album Sales (OCC)	60
UK Rock & Metal Albums (OCC)	5
US Top Current Albums (Billboard)	52
US Heatseekers Albums (Billboard)	1
US Top Hard Rock Album Sales (Billboard)	7
US Top Rock Album Sales (Billboard)	19
