= The Nexus (album) =

Studio album by Amaranthe
- Released: 13 March 2013
- Recorded: 24 September – 24 November 2012
- Studios: Hansen (Ribe, Denmark); Amaranthe (Gothenburg, Sweden)
- Genres: Power metal; metalcore; melodic death metal
- Length: 41:34
- Label: Spinefarm
- Producer: Jacob Hansen

Amaranthe chronology
Amaranthe (2011)	The Nexus (2013)	Massive Addictive (2014)

Singles from The Nexus
- 1. "The Nexus" Released: 25 January 2013; 2. "Burn with Me" Released: 17 June 2013; 3. "Invincible" Released: 26 November 2013

Professional ratings
Review scores
Source	Rating
AllMusic	3.5/5 stars
Metal.de	2/10 stars
Metal Hammer (GER)	5.0/7
Sputnikmusic	3.5/5

The Nexus is the second studio album by Swedish heavy metal band Amaranthe. The album was released on varying dates in March 2013, starting on the 13th in Japan and concluding on the 26th in the US. The Nexus is a development of the sound and ideas Amaranthe introduced on their first record. The band stated that they felt "the contrasts are greater, the mix and blends of genres is more controversial, and more creative freedoms were taken in this album." It was the last album with harsh vocalist Andy Solveström.

== Track listing ==
All lyrics are written by Jake E and Olof Mörck, except where noted; all music is composed by Mörck, Jake E and Elize Ryd, except where noted.

The Nexus – Standard edition
No.	Title	Length
1.	"Afterlife"	3:14
2.	"Invincible"	3:11
3.	"The Nexus"	3:16
4.	"Theory of Everything"	3:34
5.	"Stardust"	3:08
6.	"Burn with Me"	4:00
7.	"Mechanical Illusion"	4:01
8.	"Razorblade"	3:05
9.	"Future on Hold"	3:17
10.	"Electroheart"	3:48
11.	"Transhuman"	3:55
12.	"Infinity"	3:05
Total length:		41:34

The Nexus – Japanese edition (bonus tracks)
No.	Title	Lyrics	Music	Length
13.	"Burn with Me" (acoustic)			3:53
14.	"Hunger" (acoustic)	Jake E; Mörck; Andy Solveström	Mörck; Jake E; Ryd; Solveström	3:21
Total length:				48:48

The Nexus – Digisleeve edition (bonus tracks)
No.	Title	Music	Length
13.	"Afterlife" (acoustic)		3:13
14.	"Leave Everything Behind" (early version)	Mörck; Jake E	3:18
Total length:			48:05

The Nexus – iTunes Store edition (bonus track)
No.	Title	Lyrics	Music	Length
13.	"Hunger" (remix)	Jake E; Mörck; Solveström	Mörck; Jake E; Ryd; Solveström	3:17
Total length:				44:51

The Nexus – Spotify edition (bonus tracks)
No.	Title	Lyrics	Music	Length
13.	"Amaranthine" (acoustic)	Jake E; Mörck; Solveström	Mörck; Jake E	3:09
14.	"Leave Everything Behind" (Power Rock acoustic version)		Mörck; Jake E	3:18
Total length:				48:01

The Nexus – Japanese deluxe edition (bonus DVD)
No.	Title	Director(s)	Length
1.	"The Nexus" (music video)	Patric Ullaeus	4:28
2.	"1.000.000 Lightyears" (live video)	Johan Carlén	4:09
3.	"The Making of The Nexus"		15:33
Total length:			24:10

== Personnel ==
=== Amaranthe ===
- Elize Ryd – clean vocals (female)
- Jake E – clean vocals (male)
- Andy Solveström – harsh vocals
- Olof Mörck – guitars, keyboards
- Johan Andreassen – bass
- Morten Løwe Sørensen – drums

=== Production ===
- Jacob Hansen – production, engineer, mixing, mastering
- Olof Mörck – production
- Jake E – production

=== Miscellaneous ===
- Gustavo Sazes – cover art, booklet design
- Leticia Dumas – additional artwork photos
- Johan Carlén – band photos

== Charts ==
Chart	Peak position
Finnish Albums Chart	4
Swedish Albums Chart	6
US Heatseeker Albums	12
UK Rock Chart	17
Swiss Albums Chart	90
Belgian Ultratop (Wallonia)	192
Japanese Albums Chart (Oricon)	31

== Scheduled release history ==
Country	Date
Japan	13 March 2013
Sweden	20 March 2013
Finland	22 March 2013
Germany	22 March 2013
UK	25 March 2013
United States	26 March 2013
