= Cyhra =

Swedish metal band

CyHra
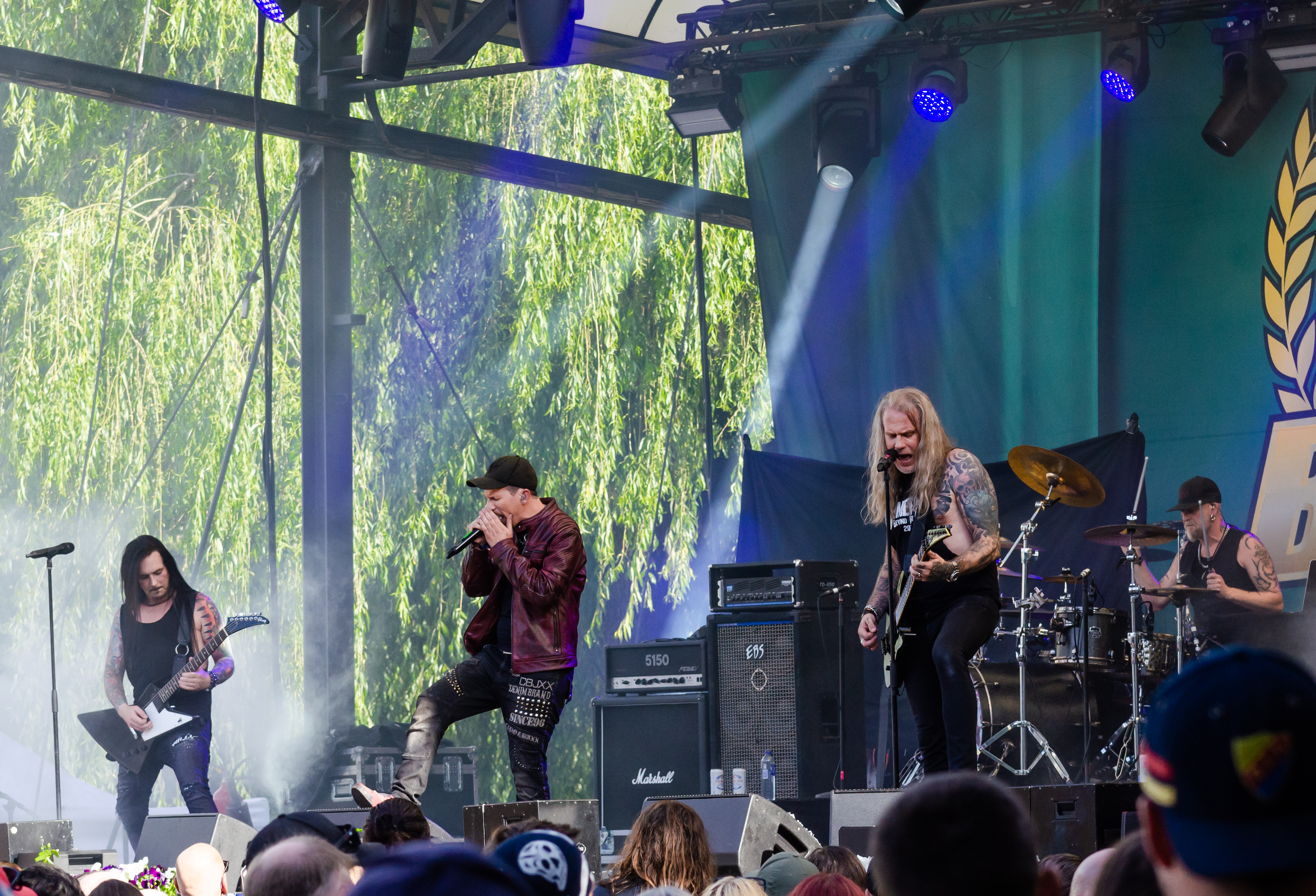
- CyHra performing in 2023

Background information
- Origin: Gothenburg, Sweden
- Genres: Alternative metal, groove metal, hard rock
- Years active: 2017–present
- Labels: Universal, Spinefarm, Nuclear Blast
- Members: Jake E Jesper Strömblad; Alex Landenburg; Euge Valovirta; Marcus Sunesson
- Past members: Peter Iwers
- Website: cyhra.com

Cyhra (stylized CyHra) is a Swedish heavy metal supergroup formed in 2017. It is made up of vocalist Joacim "Jake E" Keelyn (ex-Amaranthe), rhythm guitarist Jesper Strömblad (ex-In Flames), German drummer Alex Landenburg (Kamelot, ex-Annihilator, ex-Axxis), Finnish lead guitarist Euge Valovirta (ex-Shining) and third guitarist Marcus Sunesson (Engel). CyHra plays a modern melodic metal style.

== Members ==
=== Current members ===
- Jake E – lead vocals (2017–present)
- Jesper Strömblad – guitar, keyboards (2017–present), bass (2018–present)
- Alex Landenburg – drums (2017–present)
- Euge Valovirta – guitar, backing vocals (2017–present), bass (2018–present)
- Marcus Sunesson – guitar (2020–present, live member 2018–2020)
- Ben Varon – bass (2026–present)

=== Live members ===
- "Mr. ASUS" (Note: After Iwers' departure, his bass tracks were temporarily reproduced using backing tracks from a laptop.) – bass (2019–2026)

=== Former members ===
- Peter Iwers – bass (2017–2018)

== Discography ==
=== Studio albums ===
- Letters to Myself (2017)
- No Halos in Hell (2019)
- The Vertigo Trigger (2023)
- Requiem for a Pipe Dream (2026)

=== Singles ===
- "Karma" (2017)
- "Letter to Myself" (2017)
- "Heartrage" (2018)
- "Here to Save You" (2018)
- "Forever" (2018)
- "Out of My Life" (2019)
- "Battle from Within" (2019)
- "Ready to Rumble" (2022)
- "Life Is a Hurricane" (2023)
- "If I" (2023)
- "Superman" (2025)
