= Amaranthe =

Swedish heavy metal band

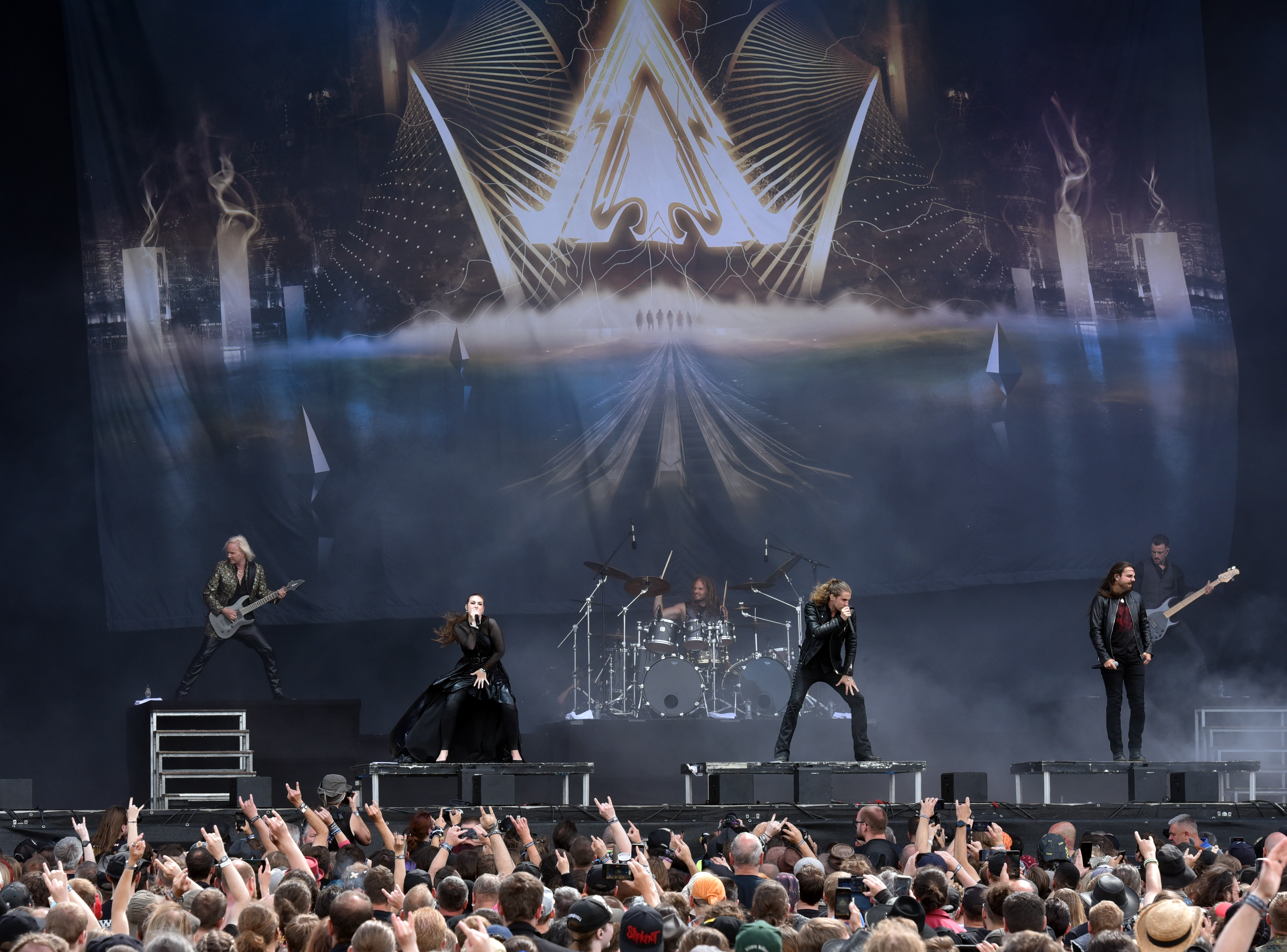
- Amaranthe performing at Wacken Open Air 2023

Background information
- Also known as: Avalanche (2008–2009)
- Origin: Gothenburg, Sweden
- Genres: Metalcore; melodic death metal; power metal; symphonic metal; pop metal
- Years active: 2008–present
- Labels: Spinefarm; Universal; Nuclear Blast
- Members: Olof Mörck; Elize Ryd; Morten Løwe Sørensen; Johan Andreassen; Nils Molin; Mikael Sehlin
- Past members: Andreas Solveström; Joacim "Jake E" Lundberg; Henrik "GG6" Englund Wilhelmsson
- Website: amaranthe.se

Logo

Amaranthe is a Swedish heavy metal band originally known as Avalanche. The band blends various genres and has three lead vocalists.

== History ==
=== Formation, self-titled debut album and The Nexus (2008–2013) ===
Formed by Olof Mörck (Dragonland, Nightrage) and Joacim "Jake E" Lundberg (Dreamland, Dream Evil) in 2008, they recruited singers Elize Ryd (toured with Kamelot) and Andreas Solveström (Cipher System, Within Y), and drummer Morten Løwe Sørensen (The Cleansing, Koldborn, Mercenary). Bassist Johan Andreassen (Engel) joined after the photoshoot for the Leave Everything Behind demo but before recording the first album, Amaranthe. The band was called Avalanche until May 2009, when they changed their name for legal reasons. The members renamed the band to Amaranthe. They later released their first demo, Leave Everything Behind.

The band's debut album, Amaranthe, was released in April 2011, and peaked at 35th on Swedish charts and 16th on Finnish Charts. Their second album, The Nexus, was released in March 2013. Mörck said the album had greater contrasts, mixed more genres, and featured more creative freedom than Amaranthe. According to Mörck, the band "took everything [up] to eleven" in the album. The album reached 6th on Swedish charts, 4th on Finnish charts, and peaked at 12th on the US Heatseekers charts.

=== Massive Addictive and Maximalism (2013–2017) ===
In October 2013, harsh vocalist Solveström left the band and was replaced with Henrik Englund Wilhelmsson (Scarpoint). Their third album, Massive Addictive, was released on 21 October 2014. The compilation Breaking Point - B-sides 2011-2015 was released on 30 October 2015. It consists of b-sides and bonus tracks from Amaranthe's career. Their fourth album, Maximalism, was released on 21 October 2016.

In November 2016, male clean vocalist Lundberg took a break from the band. In February 2017, the band confirmed that he had left permanently. In March 2017, he joined Cyhra. In July 2017, Amaranthe stated on their Facebook page that Nils Molin of Dynazty would join the band as permanent vocalist, after filling in for Lundberg on tour dates.

=== Helix and Manifest (2018–2021) ===
On 10 August 2018, Amaranthe released the single "365", from their fifth studio album, Helix, released on 19 October. At that time, they wrote and performed the credits theme song to the 12 oz. Mouse special "INVICTUS". On 16 October 2019, they announced that they had signed with Nuclear Blast Records.

On 3 January 2020, the band released their cover of Sabaton's "82nd All the Way", from Sabaton's 2019 studio album The Great War. On 13 February, the band released the single "Do or Die", which features former Arch Enemy vocalist Angela Gossow on growling vocals and Arch Enemy guitarist Jeff Loomis on the guitar solo. The official music video, filmed in Spain, was released the next day. In the music video's description, the band's label, Nuclear Blast, announced that their sixth studio album would be released in September 2020.

On 5 March, the band released the music video for "Endlessly", from the album Maximalism. The video was directed, filmed and edited by Duminciuc Bogdan and documents the Transylvanian wedding of guitarist Mörck and wife Cătălina Popa, the flutist from German symphonic metal band Haggard, which took place on 19 July 2019 at Sungarden, Cluj-Napoca, Romania. Amaranthe released their sixth studio album, Manifest, on 2 October 2020. The first single, "Viral", was released on 26 June 2020, followed by second single "Strong" on 14 August 2020, and third single "Archangel" on 18 September 2020.

=== The Catalyst (2021–present) ===
In December 2021, Amaranthe released the single "PVP" as the official anthem for the Swedish E-Sports world cup team at the E-Sports world championship. The single was accompanied by a music video and a Browser game, hosted on the band's website.

On 8 June 2022, Wilhelmsson left the band to spend more time with his family and rest from touring. He said that he planned to release solo material in the then-near future. Amaranthe announced that two special guests would replace Wilhelmsson at their summer shows of that year. On 6 October, Amaranthe released "Find Life", the first single from their seventh album.

On 27 June 2023, Amaranthe released second single "Damnation Flame", and revealed new harsh vocalist Mikael Sehlin. The band later announced their seventh studio album, The Catalyst, released on 23 February 2024. On 26 September, the band unveiled third single "Insatiable". On 16 November, they premiered the fourth single, "Outer Dimensions". On 11 January 2024, Amaranthe released the fifth single, "Re-Vision". The music video for the title track was released 23 February 2024, to coincide with the album release.

== Musical style ==
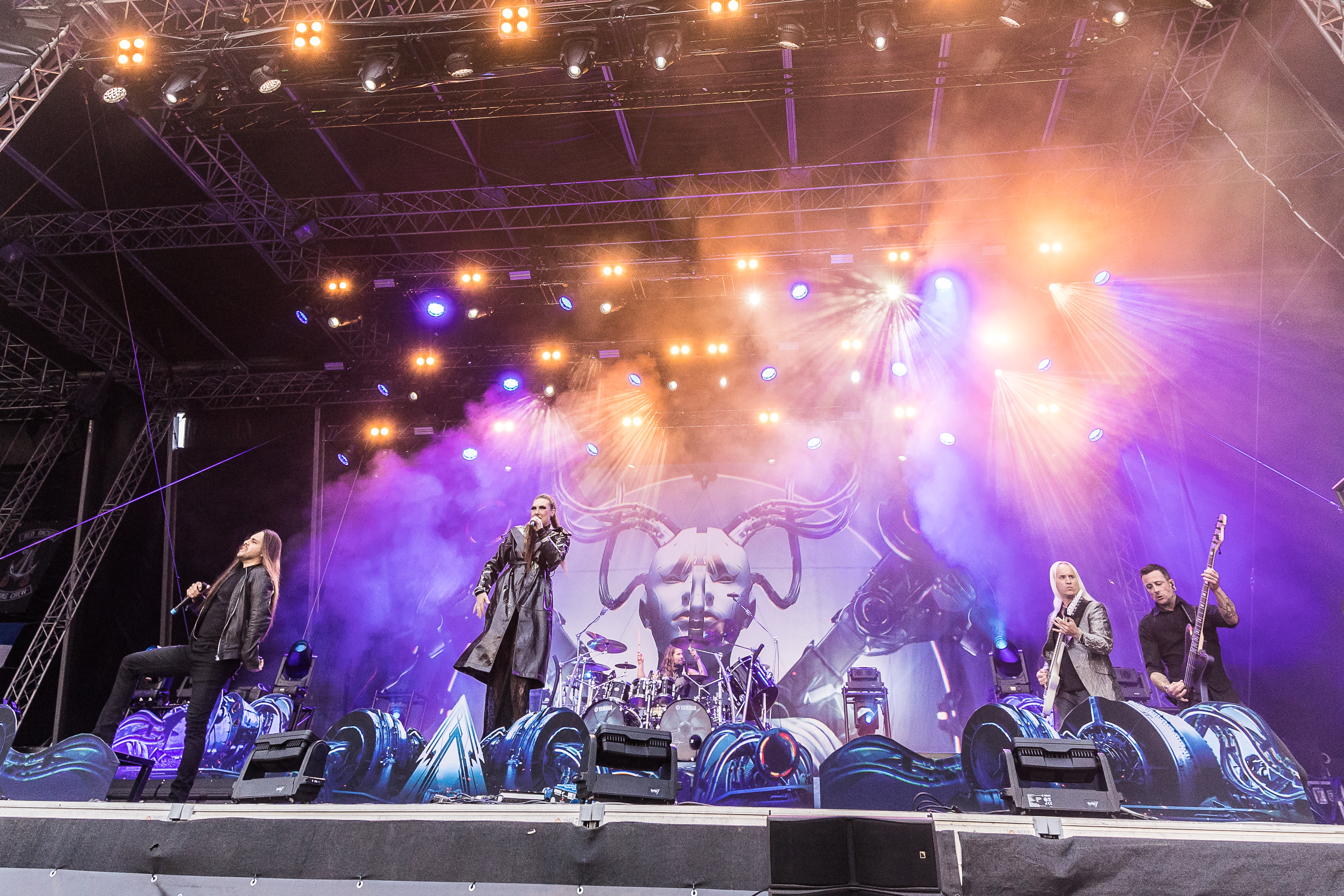
Amaranthe in 2024

Amaranthe's music remains difficult to categorize within heavy metal. Band members, websites, and critics have referred to the band and their albums as various different genres such as pop metal, melodic death metal, metalcore, power metal, symphonic metal, death metal, heavy metal, and alternative metal.

== Band members ==
Current

- Olof Mörck – guitars, keyboards, synthesizers (2008–present), bass (2008–2009)
- Elize Ryd – female clean vocals (2008–present)
- Morten Løwe Sørensen – drums (2008–present)
- Johan Andreassen – bass (2010–present)
- Nils Molin – male clean vocals (2017–present)
- Mikael Sehlin – harsh vocals (2023–present)

Former

- Joacim "Jake E" Lundberg – male clean vocals (2008–2017)
- Andreas Solveström – harsh vocals (2008–2013)
- Henrik "GG6" Englund Wilhelmsson – harsh vocals (2013–2022)

Touring

- Olle Ekman – harsh vocals (2015)
- Chris Adam Hedman Sörbye – male clean vocals (2016–2017)
- Rob Love Magnusson – guitars (2019)
- Samy Elbanna – harsh vocals (2022, 2024)
- Richard Sjunnesson – harsh vocals (2022)
- Melissa Bonny – female clean vocals (2025)

== Discography ==
- Amaranthe (2011)
- The Nexus (2013)
- Massive Addictive (2014)
- Maximalism (2016)
- Helix (2018)
- Manifest (2020)
- The Catalyst (2024)
