= Emotion Factory Reset =

Studio album by Armored Saint
- Released: May 22, 2026
- Recorded: April 2025
- Studios: 606; Secret Hand; Skullseven; Constantine; Bridge
- Genre: Heavy metal
- Length: 48:02
- Label: Metal Blade
- Producer: Joey Vera

Armored Saint chronology
Symbol of Salvation: Live (2021)	Emotion Factory Reset (2026)

Professional ratings
Review scores
Source	Rating
Blabbermouth.net	8/10
Rock Hard	8.0/10 stars
Sputnikmusic	2.5/5 stars

Emotion Factory Reset is the ninth studio album by American heavy metal band Armored Saint. It was released on May 22, 2026 by Metal Blade. The album was produced by bassist Joey Vera, and mixed by Jay Ruston.

== Background ==
In a July 2023 interview, John Bush confirmed that he and Vera had "started writing some songs a little bit" for the next Armored Saint album. In April 2025, Armored Saint announced plans to enter the studio in May to begin recording their ninth album for a spring 2026 release.

== Recording and musical style ==
Like the previous four studio albums, Emotion Factory Reset was produced by bassist Joey Vera and mixed by Jay Ruston. It has been described as a challenge for the band, featuring songs that are not always immediately accessible. Vera said: "Each Armored Saint record, to me, is like a new skin for the band, a different chapter. I don't think we've ever repeated ourselves. (...) Every album has been pretty different from the previous one, a snapshot in time. In 2026, 'Emotion Factory Reset' is where our heads are at."

According to guitarist Phil Sandoval, the album title refers to the idea that humanity could use a sort of reset to factory settings. "If we could reset our 'emotion factory' to a state of inner peace, we would all be better off. John incorporated this metaphor beautifully into the lyrics of 'Close to the Bone'."

== Release and promotion ==
On March 24, 2026, Armored Saint announced that their ninth album, Emotion Factory Reset, was set to be released on May 22. The band toured in support of the album by performing at Milwaukee Metal Fest in June 2026, and touring Europe with Testament in the summer. They will also co-headline a North American tour in the fall with Metal Church.

== Critical reception ==
Writing for Blabbermouth.net, Dom Lawson called Emotion Factory Reset "full of vibrant performances" that proves how much the Armored Saint remains enjoying themselves. German Rock Hard magazine editors voted Emotion Factory Reset as "Album of the Month", with an average rating of 8.0 out of ten.

== Track listing ==
Emotion Factory Reset track listing
No.	Title	Length
1.	"Close to the Bone"	4:09
2.	"Every Man-Any Man"	4:20
3.	"Not on Your Life"	3:37
4.	"Hit a Moonshot"	4:34
5.	"Buckeye"	5:56
6.	"Compromise"	3:17
7.	"It's a Buzzkill"	4:01
8.	"Throwing Caution to the Wind"	3:57
9.	"Ladders and Slides"	4:21
10.	"Bottom Feeder"	5:03
11.	"Epilogue"	4:42
12.	"One Chain (Don't Make No Prison) (People cover) (Bouns track)"	3:50
Total length:		48:02

== Personnel ==
Credits are adapted from the album's liner notes.

=== Armored Saint ===
- John Bush – vocals, cover concept
- Jeff Duncan – guitars, vocals, cover concept
- Phil Sandoval – guitars, cover concept
- Joey Vera – bass, guitars, vocals, production, engineering, cover concept, art direction
- Gonzo Sandoval – drums, percussion, cover concept, photography post-production, retouching

=== Additional contributors ===
- Jay Ruston – mixing
- Paul Logus – mastering
- Oliver Roman – engineering
- Bill Metoyer – engineering
- Jason Contantine – engineering
- Gene Provencio – drum recording technician
- Charlie Koryn – drum recording technician
- DDKing – cover art
- Brian Ames – layout
- Doug Stock – photos, photography post-production, retouching
- Paul Manson – photos
- Stephanie Cabral – photos
- Scott Waters – photos

== Charts ==
Chart performance for Emotion Factory Reset
Chart (2026)	Peak position
Austrian Albums (Ö3 Austria)	45
Belgian Albums (Ultratop Flanders)	104
Belgian Albums (Ultratop Wallonia)	166
German Albums (Offizielle Top 100)	25
Swiss Albums (Schweizer Hitparade)	20
Scottish Albums (Official Charts)	99
UK Albums (Official Charts)	75
UK Independent Albums (Official Charts)	28
UK Rock & Metal Albums (Official Charts)	14
