= Saints Will Conquer =

Live album by Armored Saint
- Released: August 19, 1988
- Genre: Heavy metal
- Length: 31:39
- Label: Metal Blade

Armored Saint chronology
Raising Fear (1987)	Saints Will Conquer (1988)	Symbol of Salvation (1991)

Professional ratings
Review scores
Source	Rating
AllMusic	2.5/5 stars

Saints Will Conquer is the first live album by American heavy metal band Armored Saint recorded during the Raising Fear tour. It was recorded on October 9, 1987, at the Agora Ballroom in Cleveland and released on August 19, 1988, on Metal Blade Records. This short live set does not represent the first era of the band well, missing songs like fan favorite "March of the Saint" and their radio hit "Isolation". The album features a previously unreleased studio version of "No Reason to Live" from their first demo from 1983.

== Track listing ==
All tracks written by Armored Saint, except where noted.

Normal version
No.	Title	Lyrics	Music	Length
1.	"Raising Fear"			3:32
2.	"Nervous Man"	Bush	Vera, Prichard	3:34
3.	"Chemical Euphoria"			4:11
4.	"Book of Blood"			4:46
5.	"Can U Deliver"			4:32
6.	"Long Before I Die"	Bush	Vera	2:42
7.	"Madhouse"			4:21
8.	"No Reason to Live" (studio track)	Armored Saint including Phil Sandoval	Armored Saint including Phil Sandoval	4:01
Total length:				31:39

2009 Australian tour compilation
No.	Title	Lyrics	Music	Length
1.	"March of the Saint" (2001 version)	Armored Saint including Phil Sandoval	Armored Saint including Phil Sandoval	3:55
2.	"Reign of Fire" (from the original album Symbol of Salvation)	Bush	Prichard	3:57
3.	"Last Train Home" (from the original album Symbol of Salvation)	Bush	Duncan	5:19
4.	"Tribal Dance" (from the original album Symbol of Salvation)	Bush	Prichard, Vera, G. Sandoval	4:07
5.	"Symbol of Salvation" (from the original album Symbol of Salvation)	Bush, G. Sandoval	Duncan, Vera	4:36
6.	"Hanging Judge" (from the original album Symbol of Salvation)	Bush	Prichard	3:45
7.	"The Pillar" (from the original album Revelation)	Vera, Bush	Vera, Bush	4:58
8.	"After Me, the Flood" (from the original album Revelation)	Vera, Bush	Vera, Bush	5:07
9.	"Nervous Man"	Bush	Vera, Prichard	3:33
10.	"Chemical Euphoria"			4:10
11.	"Long Before I Die"	Bush	Vera	2:42
12.	"Can U Deliver"			4:32
13.	"Madhouse"			4:20
Total length:				55:01

== Credits ==
- John Bush – vocals
- Dave Prichard – guitar (tracks 1–8 and 9–13 of the 2009 compilation)
- Joey Vera – bass
- Gonzo Sandoval – drums
- Phil Sandoval – guitar (tracks 1–8 of the 2009 compilation)
- Jeff Duncan – guitar (tracks 1–8 of the 2009 compilation)
