= Armored Saint (EP) =

EP by Armored Saint
- Released: August 9, 1983
- Recorded: Track Record Studios, Los Angeles
- Genre: Heavy metal
- Length: 11:38
- Labels: Metal Blade, Enigma
- Producer: Armored Saint

Armored Saint chronology
Armored Saint (1983)	March of the Saint (1984)

Professional ratings
Review scores
Source	Rating
AllMusic link	2/5 stars

Armored Saint is the first studio effort by American heavy metal band Armored Saint. It was released in 1983 on Metal Blade Records. Chrysalis Records signed the band in 1984 after listening to the EP. Opening track "Lesson Well Learned" was previously featured on Metal Blade's compilation Metal Massacre II in 1982. The EP is featured on the 2001 compilation Nod to the Old School.

== Track listing ==
All tracks by Armored Saint

Side A
No.	Title	Length
1.	"Lesson Well Learned"	2:52
2.	"False Alarm"	4:03

Side B
No.	Title	Length
3.	"On the Way"	4:43
Total length:		11:38

2012 bonus tracks
No.	Title	Length
1.	"No Reason to Live"	3:25
2.	"Stricken by Fate"	4:43

== Personnel ==
- John Bush – vocals
- Dave Prichard – guitars
- Phil Sandoval – guitars
- Joey Vera – bass
- Gonzo Sandoval – drums

Production

- Bill Metoyer – engineering
- John Georgopoulos – art direction, design
- Dana Ross – photography
