= Punching the Sky =

Studio album by Armored Saint
- Released: October 23, 2020
- Studios: Bridge Studios (Los Angeles, California); Constantine Studios (Las Vegas, Nevada); Eldorado Recording (Burbank, California); Skullseven Recording (North Hollywood)
- Genre: Heavy metal
- Length: 53:35
- Label: Metal Blade
- Producers: Bill Metoyer, Joey Vera

Armored Saint chronology
Win Hands Down (2015)	Punching the Sky (2020)	Symbol of Salvation: Live (2021)

Singles from Punching the Sky
- 1. "End of the Attention Span" Released: August 12, 2020; 2. "Lone Wolf" Released: June 29, 2021

Punching the Sky is the eighth studio album by American heavy metal band Armored Saint. It was released on October 23, 2020. The album was produced by Bill Metoyer and bassist Joey Vera, and mixed by Jay Ruston. The track "End of the Attention Span" was the first single and was released on August 12, 2020, along with a music video. A music video was also made for the next single "Lone Wolf" on June 29, 2021.

== Track listing ==
No.	Title	Length
1.	"Standing on the Shoulders of Giants"	6:46
2.	"End of the Attention Span"	5:13
3.	"Bubble"	5:22
4.	"My Jurisdiction"	4:39
5.	"Do Wrong to None"	5:06
6.	"Lone Wolf"	4:18
7.	"Missile to Gun"	4:23
8.	"Fly in the Ointment"	5:02
9.	"Bark, No Bite"	4:18
10.	"Unfair"	4:03
11.	"Never You Fret"	4:19
Total length:		53:35

== Personnel ==
Band Members

- John Bush – vocals
- Phil Sandoval – guitars
- Jeff Duncan – guitars
- Joey Vera – bass, backing vocals, percussion
- Gonzo Sandoval – drums

Additional musicians

- Jason Constantine – backing vocals
- Dizzy Reed – Hammond B3, piano

Production

- Joey Vera – production, engineering, mixing
- Bill Metoyer – producer, engineering
- Josh Newell – engineering
- Jay Ruston – mixing
- Ryan Williams – mixing
- Paul Logus – mastering
- Anthony Biuso – technician (drums)
- Heidi Weaver – product manager
- Brian J. Ames – layout
- Steve Stone – cover art
- Travis Shinn – photography
