= Win Hands Down =

Studio album by Armored Saint
- Released: June 2, 2015
- Studios: Bridge Studios (Los Angeles, California); Travis Dickerson Studios (Chatsworth); Clearlake Audio (Burbank, California)
- Genre: Heavy metal
- Length: 51:00
- Label: Metal Blade
- Producer: Joey Vera

Armored Saint chronology
La Raza (2010)	Win Hands Down (2015)	Punching the Sky (2020)

Win Hands Down is the seventh studio album by American heavy metal band Armored Saint. It was released on June 2, 2015. The vocals were recorded at Bridge Recording in Los Angeles, guitars and bass were recorded at Travis Dickerson Studios in Chatsworth and drums were recorded at Clearlake Audio in Burbank.

Two videos have been released for the album: the title track and the song "An Exercise in Debauchery". The band toured extensively in summer 2015 with Saxon in support of the album.

== Critical reception ==
Metal.de rated the album 9 out of 10 points. Marek Protzak wrote, there was "no other band at the moment" who played "classical metal in such an inspired and versed manner". German Rock Hard magazine editors voted Win Hands Down as "Album of the Month". Editor-in-chief Boris Kaiser called Armored Saint "one of the most underrated bands in US Metal" and compared the album to 1991's Symbol of Salvation. He rated it 8.5 of 10.

== Commercial performance ==
The album sold double the number of copies as the previous album La Raza.

== Track listing ==
All tracks are written by Joey Vera and John Bush except where noted.

No.	Title	Writer(s)	Length
1.	"Win Hands Down"		5:06
2.	"Mess"		4:35
3.	"An Exercise in Debauchery"		6:00
4.	"Muscle Memory"		7:14
5.	"That Was Then, Way Back When"		5:08
6.	"With a Full Head of Steam"	Vera, Bush, Jeff Duncan, Phil Sandoval, Gonzo Sandoval	5:18
7.	"In an Instant"		7:36
8.	"Dive"		4:40
9.	"Up Yours"		5:23
Total length:			51:00

Japanese bonus track
No.	Title	Length
1.	"Dive (Deep Remix)"	4:41
Total length:		55:41

== Personnel ==
Band Members

- John Bush – vocals
- Phil Sandoval – guitars
- Jeff Duncan – guitars
- Joey Vera – bass, backing vocals
- Gonzo Sandoval – drums

Additional musician

- Pearl Aday – guest vocals on "With a Full Head of Steam"

Production

- Joey Vera – production, engineering
- Jay Ruston – drum engineering, mixing
- Josh Newall – drum engineering

== Charts ==
Chart (2015)	Peak position
Belgian Albums (Ultratop Flanders)	119
Belgian Albums (Ultratop Wallonia)	94
German Albums (Offizielle Top 100)	33
Swiss Albums (Schweizer Hitparade)	84
US Billboard 200	183
US Top Album Sales (Billboard)	77
US Top Hard Rock Albums (Billboard)	3
US Top Rock Albums (Billboard)	15
