= Odin (band) =

American rock band

- Origin: Los Angeles, California
- Genres: Glam metal
- Years active: 1982–1989
- Members: Randy O Jeff Duncan; Shawn Duncan; Aaron Samson

Odin was an American glam metal band from Los Angeles, formed in 1982. The band is perhaps best known for the appearance in the film The Decline of Western Civilization Part II: The Metal Years.

Odin guitarist Jeff Duncan went on to play in the Los Angeles metal band Armored Saint after Odin broke up. Odin lead singer Randy O went on to become a teamster trucker for the film industry.

On April 13, 2025, the band briefly reunited at the Rainbow Bar and Grill for the restaurant's 53rd anniversary party.

== Albums ==
All studio albums listed, unless otherwise noted.

Year	Title	Label	Other information
1983	Caution!	Self released	Three-song EP
1985	Don't Take No For An Answer	Half-Wet Records	
1987	The Gods Must Be Crazy	Mighty Odin Music	
1988	Fight For Your Life	Perris Records	
2001	By The Gods	Mighty Odin Music	Compilation of Caution!/Don't Take No For An Answer/The Gods Must Be Crazy
2009	Best Of...	Perris Records	Compilation of Caution!/Don't Take No For An Answer/The Gods Must Be Crazy/Fight For Your Life plus a new 2007 track "Human Animal"
