= La Raza (album) =

Studio album by Armored Saint
- Released: March 16, 2010
- Recorded: Tranzformer Studios, Burbank, California
- Genre: Heavy metal
- Length: 51:34
- Label: Metal Blade
- Producer: Joey Vera

Armored Saint chronology
Nod to the Old School (2001)	La Raza (2010)	Win Hands Down (2015)

La Raza is the sixth studio album by American heavy metal band Armored Saint, released on March 16, 2010 via Metal Blade Records. Armored Saint reformed the entire Symbol of Salvation lineup to record La Raza in 2009 after an eight-year hiatus.

== Track listing ==
All tracks are written by Armored Saint.

No.	Title	Length
1.	"Loose Cannon"	5:06
2.	"Head On"	5:46
3.	"Left Hook from Right Field"	5:31
4.	"Get Off the Fence"	4:48
5.	"Chilled"	5:02
6.	"La Raza"	6:41
7.	"Black Feet"	5:07
8.	"Little Monkey"	4:45
9.	"Blues"	3:32
10.	"Bandit Country"	5:16
Total length:		51:34

Professional ratings
Review scores
Source	Rating
AllMusic	4/5 stars
Blabbermouth.net	7.5/10 stars
BW&BK	8/10 stars
Loud Online	9/10 stars

== Personnel ==
Band members

- John Bush – vocals
- Phil Sandoval – guitars
- Jeff Duncan – guitars
- Joey Vera – bass, backing vocals, additional guitar
- Gonzo Sandoval – drums

Additional musicians

- Steve Zukowsky – theremin
- Eddie Rouse – congas
- Jon Saxon – percussion

Production

- Joey Vera – production, engineering, mixing, concept
- Bryan Carlstrom – engineering, mixing
- John Nuss – assistant engineering
- Maor Appelbaum – mastering engineering
- Brian Ames – layout, sleeve design
- Gonzo Sandoval – concept
- Stephanie Cabral – concept, cover design photography
