= John Arch =

American heavy metal singer

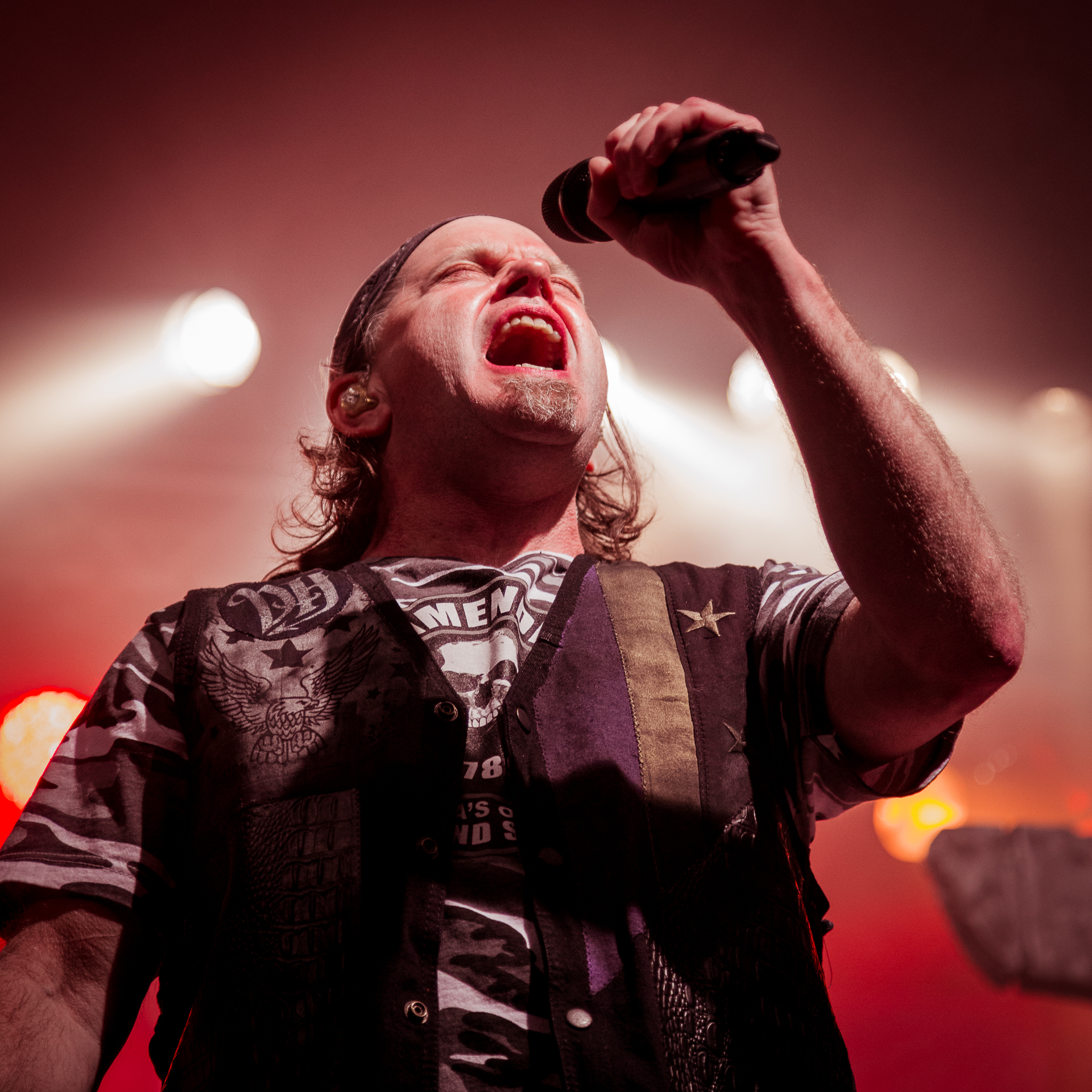
- Arch performing with Fates Warning in 2016

Background information
- Born: John Maurice Archambault; May 15, 1959 (age 67); Colorado Springs, Colorado, U.S.
- Genres: Progressive metal, heavy metal
- Occupation: Singer
- Years active: 1982–present
- Label: Metal Blade
- Member of: Arch/Matheos
- Formerly of: Fates Warning

John Arch (born John Maurice Archambault; May 15, 1959) is an American singer best known for his work with the progressive metal band Fates Warning.

== Fates Warning ==
Arch co-wrote the majority of the band's songs with guitarist Jim Matheos, and was the band's sole lyricist. After their third album, Awaken the Guardian, was released, Arch was asked to quit his job or leave the band. Financial obligations made it impossible for Arch to quit his job, and he argued that he had shown 100% commitment to the band throughout the years. However, the band informed him that they had to let him go and started to look for another singer. In one interview with John Arch, he said that he would have quit his job if he were asked, but the rest of the band never asked him to.

== Later career ==
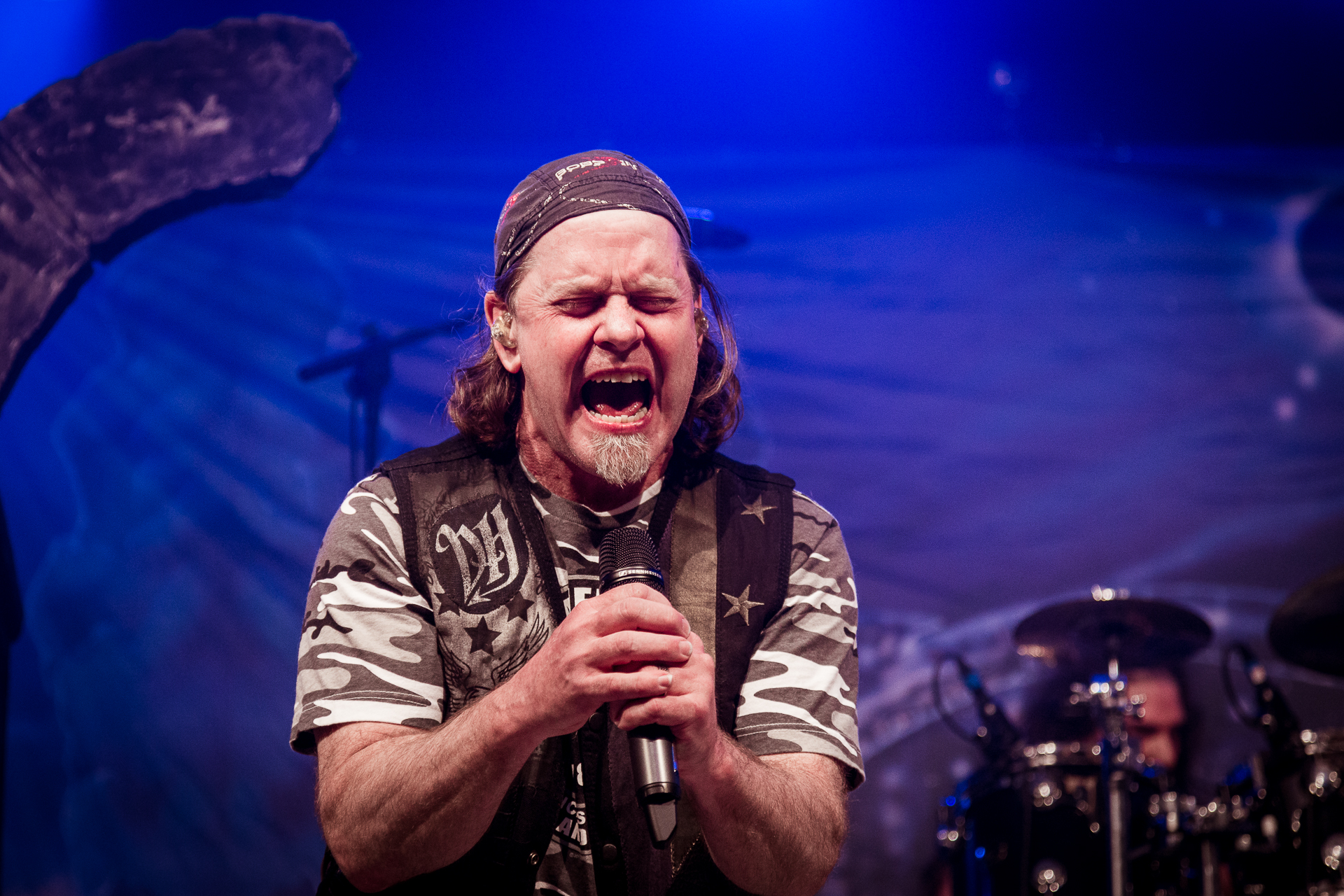
Arch performing with Fates Warning in 2016

Arch kept himself out of the metal scene for seventeen years (he currently works crafting custom furniture), with the exception of an audition as singer for the progressive metal band Dream Theater and a few others. He decided to get out of music and pursue other interests. He made his return in 2003, when his EP A Twist of Fate was released. The EP includes musicians Jim Matheos, Mike Portnoy and Joey Vera, all of whom Arch worked with at some point in the past. The EP shows that Arch's vocal ability had not decreased over the years, likely due to his long break from touring. The album contains only two songs, although these total nearly half an hour (one written solely by Arch, one co-written by Arch and Matheos – marking the first time the two wrote a song together since Awaken the Guardian).

Arch has a naturally high tenor range. He is very proficient at legato when singing.

On January 19, 2011, it was announced that Arch had reunited with Jim Matheos and the rest of the members in Fates Warning (minus Ray Alder) to record a full-length for a new band, simply titled Arch/Matheos. The band's debut full-length album, Sympathetic Resonance, was released on September 9.

== Discography ==
=== Solo albums ===
- A Twist of Fate (2003)

=== With Fates Warning ===
- Night on Bröcken (1984)
- The Spectre Within (1985)
- Awaken the Guardian (1986)
- Awaken the Guardian Live (2017)

=== With Jim Matheos (Arch/Matheos) ===
- Sympathetic Resonance (2011)
- Winter Ethereal (2019)
