= Raising Fear =

Studio album by Armored Saint
- Released: September 1987
- Recorded: October 1986 – June 1987
- Studio: Sound City, Van Nuys; Ocean Way, Hollywood; Cherokee, Hollywood
- Genre: Heavy metal
- Length: 47:46
- Label: Chrysalis
- Producer: Armored Saint and Chris Minto

Armored Saint chronology
Delirious Nomad (1985)	Raising Fear (1987)	Saints Will Conquer (1988)

Professional ratings
Review scores
Source	Rating
Allmusic	2.5/5 stars

Raising Fear is the third studio album by the American heavy metal band Armored Saint. It was released in 1987 via Chrysalis Records. The band recorded the album as a four-piece as guitarist Phil Sandoval had left Armored Saint during the recording of its previous album, Delirious Nomad, although he rejoined the band a few years later.

After Raising Fear was released, Chrysalis dropped the band. This was the last Armored Saint studio album with guitarist Dave Prichard, who was diagnosed with leukemia in 1989 and died of the disease the following year, as the band was preparing for their next album Symbol of Salvation.

== Track listing ==
All tracks are written by Armored Saint, except where noted.

Side A
No.	Title	Writer(s)	Length
1.	"Raising Fear"		3:50
2.	"Saturday Night Special" (Lynyrd Skynyrd cover)	Edward King, Ronnie Van Zant	4:24
3.	"Out on a Limb"		3:34
4.	"Isolation"		6:00
5.	"Chemical Euphoria"		4:46

Side B
No.	Title	Writer(s)	Length
6.	"Frozen Will/Legacy"	David E. Prichard, Armored Saint	6:01
7.	"Human Vulture"		5:26
8.	"Book of Blood"		4:42
9.	"Terror"		4:44
10.	"Underdogs"		4:19
Total length:			47:46

CD bonus track
No.	Title	Length
1.	"Crisis of Life"	4:05
Total length:		51:51

== Personnel ==
Band Members

- John Bush – vocals
- Dave Prichard – guitars
- Joey Vera – bass
- Gonzo Sandoval – drums

Additional musician

- Phil Brown – musical contribution

Production

- Steve MacMillan, Mike Bosley, David Eaton, Ray Pyle – assistant engineers
- Chris Minto – engineering, producer, mixing at Lion Share Studios, Los Angeles, California
- Kevin Savigar – special effects
- Neil Zlozower – photography
- Mike Doud – art direction
- Richard Kriegler – cover art
- Mastered at Bernie Grundman Mastering Lab, Hollywood, California
