= Traveler in Time =

Traveler in Time may refer to:

- "Traveller in Time", a song by Uriah Heep on their 1972 studio album Demons and Wizards
- "Traveler in Time", a song by Fates Warning on their 1985 studio album The Spectre Within
- "Traveler in Time" (Blind Guardian song), a song by Blind Guardian on their 1990 studio album Tales from the Twilight World
