= Jeff Duncan =

Jeff Duncan may refer to:

- Jeff Duncan (politician) (born 1966), U.S. representative from South Carolina
- Jeff Duncan (musician), heavy metal guitarist
- Jeff Duncan (baseball) (born 1978), New York Mets outfielder

== See also ==
- Geoff Duncan (born 1975), American politician, lieutenant governor of the U.S. state of Georgia
