= Engine (American band) =

American progressive metal band

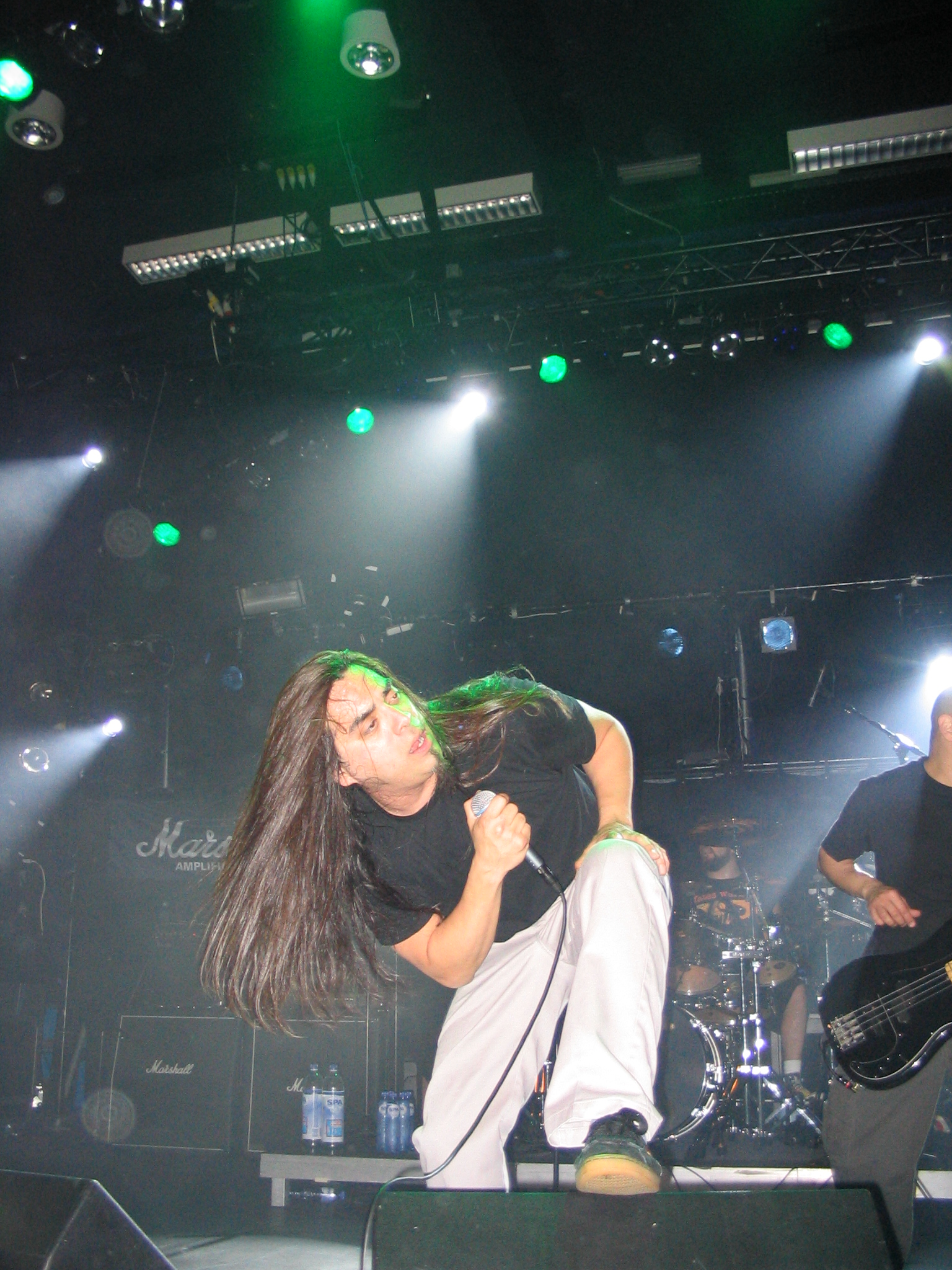
- Ray Alder

Background information
- Origin: Hartford, Connecticut, U.S.
- Genre: Nu metal
- Years active: 1999–2002
- Label: Metal Blade
- Past members: Ray Alder; Pete Parada; Joey Vera; Bernie Versailles

Engine was an American Nu metal band. Engine's lead singer is Fates Warning's Ray Alder. In addition to Ray, the outfit also included the former Agent Steel guitarist Bernie Versailles, Armored Saint bassist Joey Vera plus Face to Face drummer Pete Parada. Their debut self-titled album was released in September 1999. Superholic was the follow-up, which was issued in May 2002.

== Discography ==
- Engine, Metal Blade (1999)
- Superholic, Metal Blade (2002)
