= Engine (Engine album) =

Studio album by Engine
- Released: September 21, 1999
- Recorded: 1999 at Bill's Place in North Hollywood, California
- Genre: Nu metal
- Length: 43:28
- Label: Metal Blade
- Producer: Joey Vera

Engine chronology
Engine (1999)	Superholic (2002)

Professional ratings
Review scores
Source	Rating
Allmusic	3/5 stars
Roughedge.com	3/4 stars
Yahoo!	4.5/5 stars
Sputnikmusic	3.5/5 stars

Engine is the debut album by Engine, released September 21, 1999 on Metal Blade Records.

== Track listing ==
All lyrics are written by Ray Alder; all music is composed by Engine.

No.	Title	Length
1.	"Beast"	6:22
2.	"Alone"	3:44
3.	"Falling Star"	5:56
4.	"Taste"	4:26
5.	"I Don't Need"	4:35
6.	"Teach Me"	4:04
7.	"Bear Your Cross"	5:06
8.	"Tree of Life"	4:47
9.	"You're Awake"	4:25
Total length:		43:28

== Personnel ==
- Ray Alder – lead vocals
- Bernie Versailles – guitar
- Joey Vera – bass, producer, engineer
- Pete Parada – drums
- Bill Metoyer - mixing assistant
- Eddy Schreyer - mastering assistant
- Alex Solca - cover art and photographs
- Brian J Ames - layout
