= Night on Bröcken =

- Original vinyl edition

Studio album by Fates Warning
- Released: September 1984
- Studio: The Gallery Recording Studio, East Hartford, Connecticut
- Genre: Heavy metal
- Length: 42:26
- Label: Metal Blade
- Producer: Fates Warning

Fates Warning chronology
Night on Bröcken (1984)	The Spectre Within (1985)

Alternative cover
- 1988 reissue

Night on Bröcken is the debut studio album by the American progressive metal band Fates Warning, released in September 1984 through Metal Blade Records.

Goldmine described the sound as "a classy brand of traditional heavy metal".

The title of the album is apparently a reference to the Brocken, a mountain in Saxony-Anhalt, Germany, which is traditionally associated with witches (Walpurgis Night), most famously in Johann Wolfgang von Goethe's Faust (1806–1831). The reference becomes apparent on two original album covers that "were scrapped prior to major distribution". The spelling is a typical example of a "metal umlaut".

== Reissues ==
Night on Bröcken has been reissued several times. The first edition, featuring the original cover art, was released only on vinyl and cassette. A CD edition with new cover art was released in 1988. A double compilation album, packaged together with The Spectre Within (1985), was released in 1992. A remastered edition of Night on Bröcken was released in 1994, followed by another in 2002; the latter containing four bonus tracks and restoring the original cover art, albeit with a different font.

== Critical reception ==
Professional ratings
Review scores
Source	Rating
AllMusic	2/5 stars

Robert Taylor at AllMusic awarded Night on Bröcken two stars out of five, calling it "A very humble beginning for this excellent progressive band" but stopping short of actually recommending it for fans of progressive metal: "Metal fans will find this too close to Iron Maiden, and progressive fans should skip this altogether."

== Track listing ==
No.	Title	Writer(s)	Length
1.	"Buried Alive"	Jim Matheos, John Arch	4:40
2.	"The Calling"	Matheos, Arch	5:03
3.	"Kiss of Death"	Matheos, Arch	4:38
4.	"Night on Bröcken"	Matheos, Victor Arduini, Arch	5:29
5.	"S.E.K."	Matheos	1:19
6.	"Misfit"	Arduini, Arch	5:06
7.	"Shadowfax"	Matheos	3:16
8.	"Damnation"	Matheos, Arch	6:27
9.	"Soldier Boy"	Arduini, Arch	6:24
Total length:			42:22

2002 remastered edition bonus tracks
No.	Title	Length
10.	"Last Call" (demo; 1984)	5:39
11.	"The Calling" (rehearsal; 1983)	4:36
12.	"Kiss of Death" (live at L'Amour, Brooklyn, New York; 1985)	4:35
13.	"Flight of Icarus" (rehearsal; 1983)	5:18
Total length:		62:34

== Personnel ==
Fates Warning

- John Arch – vocals, production
- Jim Matheos – guitar, production
- Victor Arduini – guitar, production
- Joe DiBiase – bass, production
- Steve Zimmerman – drums, production

Additional credits

- mixed at Track Record, Los Angeles
- Bill Metoyer, Brian Slagel – mixing
- Doug Clark – engineering
