= A Twist of Fate =

EP by John Arch
- Released: June 17, 2003
- Genre: Progressive metal
- Length: 28:01
- Label: Metal Blade
- Producers: John Arch, Jim Matheos

John Arch chronology
| A Twist of Fate (2003) | Sympathetic Resonance (2011) |

A Twist of Fate is an EP by singer John Arch, released on June 17, 2003 through Metal Blade Records. At the time, the EP was Arch's first musical work in over seventeen years since leaving progressive metal band Fates Warning in 1987, with whom he recorded their first three albums; the last being Awaken the Guardian (1986). Consisting of two tracks, A Twist of Fate features Fates Warning founder and guitarist Jim Matheos, with whom Arch would later release a collaborative album in 2011, entitled Sympathetic Resonance, under the banner of Arch/Matheos. Also among the line-up are Dream Theater drummer Mike Portnoy and current Fates Warning bassist Joey Vera.

== Track listing ==
| No. | Title | Lyrics | Music | Length |
|---|---|---|---|---|
| 1. | "Relentless" | John Arch | Arch, Jim Matheos | 12:25 |
| 2. | "Cheyenne" | Arch | Arch | 15:36 |
| Total length: | | | | 28:01 |

== Personnel ==
- John Arch – vocals, production
- Jim Matheos – guitar, keyboard, engineering, production
- Mike Portnoy – drums
- Joey Vera – bass, engineering
- Andy Happel – cello, violin
- Phil Magnotti – engineering, mixing, mastering
