= Sympathetic Resonance (album) =

Studio album by Arch/Matheos
- Released: September 9, 2011
- Recorded: Carriage House Studios in Stamford, Connecticut; Bridge Studios in Woodland Hills, Los Angeles; "somewhere in the woods of New Hampshire"
- Genre: Progressive metal
- Length: 54:35
- Label: Metal Blade
- Producer: Jim Matheos

Arch/Matheos chronology
A Twist of Fate (2003)	Sympathetic Resonance (2011)	Winter Ethereal (2019)

Sympathetic Resonance is a collaborative studio album by singer John Arch and guitarist Jim Matheos (credited as Arch/Matheos), released on September 9, 2011 through Metal Blade Records.

== Background ==
Matheos founded the progressive metal band Fates Warning in 1983, while Arch left the band in 1987 and retired from the music business after having served as lead vocalist on their first three albums. Both musicians reunited on Arch's 2003 EP A Twist of Fate, after which Matheos contacted Arch about re-emerging from retirement, having himself written the first few songs for a new Fates Warning album. Upon Matheos' realization that the next Fates Warning album would be delayed for several years, he opted to record the music with Arch as part of a new album. The three songs initially intended for Fates Warning which ultimately appeared on Sympathetic Resonance were "Neurotically Wired", "Midnight Serenade" and "Stained Glass Sky". Fates Warning's subsequent album, Darkness in a Different Light, was released in 2013.

== Critical reception ==
Professional ratings
Review scores
Source	Rating
About.com	4/5 stars
AllMusic	No rating
Metal Storm	7/10
Sputnikmusic	4.5/5

Trey Spencer at Sputnikmusic gave Sympathetic Resonance a score of 4.5 out of 5, calling it "modern, guitar-driven progressive metal featuring an all-star lineup that manages to avoid falling into a cycle of self-indulgent tangents." He made it a point to stress that the album is neither an "unofficial Fates Warning release" nor "Awaken the Guardian Part II", and that it "sounds nothing like what Fates Warning have been doing lately." Arch's vocals were described as "still as powerful and unique as they've always been" despite his lengthy absence from making full-length music. Spencer also noted that longtime fans of Arch's style would not be disappointed, while also acknowledging a potential adjustment period for new listeners.

== Track listing ==
All tracks are written by Jim Matheos and John Arch.

No.	Title	Length
1.	"Neurotically Wired"	11:12
2.	"Midnight Serenade"	5:27
3.	"Stained Glass Sky"	13:56
4.	"On the Fence"	8:11
5.	"Any Given Day (Strangers Like Me)"	10:27
6.	"Incense and Myrrh"	5:22
Total length:		54:35

== Personnel ==
- John Arch – vocals
- Jim Matheos – guitar, mixing, production
- Frank Aresti – additional guitar solos
- Bobby Jarzombek – drums
- Joey Vera – bass, engineering
- Phil Magnotti – engineering, mixing
- Alan Douches – mastering

== Charts ==
Chart (2011) !	Peak position
US Heatseekers Albums (Billboard)	14
US Hard Rock Albums (Billboard)	22
Austrian albums chart	67
German albums chart	27
Swiss albums chart	78
