= March of the Saint =

Studio album by Armored Saint
- Released: September 26, 1984
- Recorded: Ocean Way Recording and Clover Recording Studios (Hollywood, California)
- Genre: Heavy metal
- Length: 38:35
- Label: Chrysalis
- Producer: Michael James Jackson

Armored Saint chronology
Armored Saint (EP) (1983)	March of the Saint (1984)	Delirious Nomad (1985)

Professional ratings
Review scores
Source	Rating
AllMusic	4.5/5 stars

March of the Saint is the debut studio album by American heavy metal band Armored Saint. It was released in 1984 by Chrysalis Records and recorded with producer Michael James Jackson who previously worked for Kiss. The debut album yielded a minor MTV hit with "Can U Deliver", but Joey Vera and John Bush later recalled the album's recording as a frustrating and disappointing experience, explaining that Jackson's approach was much more commercial than the heavy metal sound the band had wanted. As Vera recalled in 2006: "At the end of the record we were very unhappy with the production, the mix, the way we worked and who we worked with. And the producer and our manager let us spend over ($)300,000 on our first record. To this day we are still in debt for that one."

== Track listing ==
Side A
No.	Title	Length
1.	"March of the Saint"	4:11
2.	"Can U Deliver"	3:34
3.	"Mad House"	3:53
4.	"Take a Turn"	3:50
5.	"Seducer"	3:49

Side B
No.	Title	Length
6.	"Mutiny on the World"	3:29
7.	"Glory Hunter"	5:09
8.	"Stricken by Fate"	3:30
9.	"Envy"	2:56
10.	"False Alarm"	4:14
Total length:		38:35

2006 collector's edition bonus tracks
No.	Title	Length
1.	"March of the Saint" (24-track Demo Version)	3:32
2.	"Seducer" (24-track Demo Version)	3:39
3.	"Mutiny on the World" (24-track Demo Version)	3:37
Total length:		49:23

== Note ==
The 2006 remastered edition, released by Rock Candy Records, includes a 16-page color booklet containing archive pictures and memorabilia, an extended essay by English music journalist Malcolm Dome, and new interviews with John Bush and Joey Vera.

== Personnel ==
Band members

- John Bush – vocals
- Dave Prichard – guitars
- Phil Sandoval – guitars
- Joey Vera – bass
- Gonzo Sandoval – drums

Production

- Michael James Jackson – production
- Dave Whittman – mixing
- Chris Minto – engineering
- Steve MacMillan – assistant engineering
- Steve Hirsch – additional engineering
- Todd Prepsky – additional engineering
- David Egerton – additional engineering
- Bernie Grundman – mastering
- Ross Garfield – technician
- Bill Reed – technician
- Q Prime Inc., D.M.A. – management
- Gareth Williams – cover art
- John Pasche – art direction
- Neil Zlozower – photography

Solos

- 1. solo: Dave Prichard; end solo: Phil E. Sandoval.
- 2. 1st solo: Dave Prichard; 2nd solo: Phil E. Sandoval.
- 3. solo: Dave Prichard; intro & end solos: Phil E. Sandoval.
- 4. solo: Phil E. Sandoval.
- 5. intro & 1st solos: Dave Prichard; 2nd solo: Phil E. Sandoval.
- 6. intro: Dave Prichard; solo: Phil E. Sandoval.
- 7. 1st solo: Phil E. Sandoval; 2nd solo: Dave Prichard.
- 8. 1st solo: Phil E. Sandoval; 2nd solo: Dave Prichard.
- 9. solo: Phil E. Sandoval.
- 10. 1st solo: Dave Prichard; 2nd & end solos: Phil E. Sandoval.

== Charts ==
Album

Year	Chart	Position
1984	Billboard Pop Albums	138
