= Superholic =

Studio album by Engine
- Released: May 21, 2002
- Genre: Nu metal
- Length: 45:23
- Label: Metal Blade
- Producer: Bernie Versailles, Joey Vera, Ray Alder

Engine chronology
Engine (1999)	Superholic (2002)

Professional ratings
Review scores
Source	Rating
AllMusic	3/5 stars
Chronicles of Chaos	6.5/10
The Encyclopedia of Popular Music	3/5 stars

Superholic is the second album by the heavy metal supergroup Engine. It was released on May 21, 2002, on Metal Blade Records. This was the band's final album, as the members returned to their main projects.

== Critical reception ==
AllMusic wrote: "The quality is on par with the previous effort, however, in that a few good moments -- the best of which is 'Fascination Street,' a moody, simmering number that has the most soul of anything present here -- intertwine with a sizable amount of filler." The Encyclopedia of Popular Music wrote that the album "saw the band take even more chances musically."

== Track listing ==
All tracks are written by Ray Alder and Bernie Versailles except "Fascination Street", written by The Cure.

No.	Title	Length
1.	"Losing Ground"	3:49
2.	"Suffocated"	3:25
3.	"I Know"	3:49
4.	"The Perfect Star"	5:28
5.	"Superholic"	4:43
6.	"Fascination Street (The Cure cover)"	4:37
7.	"1 A.M."	2:14
8.	"Home"	5:20
9.	"Realize"	3:21
10.	"Save Me"	4:50
11.	"Mine"	3:42
Total length:		45:23
