= Delirious Nomad =

Studio album by Armored Saint
- Released: November 4, 1985
- Recorded: Can-Am Studios, Los Angeles, California
- Genre: Heavy metal
- Length: 41:54
- Label: Chrysalis
- Producer: Max Norman

Armored Saint chronology
March of the Saint (1984)	Delirious Nomad (1985)	Raising Fear (1987)

Professional ratings
Review scores
Source	Rating
AllMusic	4/5 stars

Delirious Nomad is the second studio album by the American heavy metal band Armored Saint. It was released in 1985 via Chrysalis Records and recorded with producer Max Norman who previously worked for Ozzy Osbourne. While recording the album, guitarist Phil Sandoval left the band.

In 2011, Rock Candy released a remastered version of Delirious Nomad with two additional tracks.

== Track listing ==
Side A
No.	Title	Lyrics	Music	Length
1.	"Long Before I Die"	John Bush	Joey Vera	2:47
2.	"Nervous Man"	Bush	Vera, Dave Prichard	4:01
3.	"Over the Edge"	Phil Sandoval, Bush	P. Sandoval, Gonzo Sandoval	4:51
4.	"The Laugh"	Bush	Vera, Prichard	4:21
5.	"Conqueror"	Bush	Prichard, Bush	4:28

Side B
No.	Title	Lyrics	Music	Length
6.	"For the Sake of Heaviness"	Vera, Bush	Vera, Prichard	4:23
7.	"Aftermath"	Bush	Vera, P. Sandoval	5:31
8.	"In the Hole"	Bush	Prichard	3:50
9.	"You're Never Alone"	Bush	P. Sandoval	4:37
10.	"Released"	Bush	P. Sandoval	3:05
Total length:				41:54

2011 remastered edition bonus tracks
No.	Title	Lyrics	Music	Length
1.	"The Laugh" (Demo)	Bush	Vera, Prichard	4:53
2.	"You're Never Alone" (Rough Mix)	Bush	P. Sandoval	5:55

== Personnel ==
Band members

- John Bush – lead vocals, backing vocals
- Dave Prichard – guitars
- Joey Vera – bass, backing vocals
- Gonzo Sandoval – drums, percussion

Additional musician

- Phil Sandoval – second half of guitar solo on "Over the Edge" and additional rhythm guitar on "Aftermath"

Production

- Mixed at Record Plant and Can-Am Studios, Los Angeles, California
- Max Norman – producer, mixing
- Bill Freesh – engineer, mixing
- Matt Brady – engineer
- Michael J. Bowman – assistant engineer
- Bob Ludwig – mastering at Masterdisk
- Marty Capune – production management
- Ron Lafitte – tour manager
- Brockun, Q Prime Inc. – management
- Geffrey von Gerlach – art direction
- Ria Lewerke – art direction
- Armored Saint – cover concept
- Tom Murray – photography
