= Nod to the Old School =

Compilation album by Armored Saint
- Released: July 24, 2001
- Genre: Heavy metal
- Length: 77:20
- Label: Metal Blade
- Producers: Armored Saint, Bill Metoyer, Joey Vera, Brian Foraker, Timothy Powell

Armored Saint chronology
Revelation (2000)	Nod to the Old School (2001)	La Raza (2010)

Professional ratings
Review scores
Source	Rating
AllMusic	3/5 stars
Kerrang!	3/5 stars

Nod to the Old School is a compilation album by the American heavy metal band Armored Saint. It was released in 2001 on Metal Blade Records. The album features some new tracks ("Real Swagger" and "Unstable"), live versions of two Revelation album tracks, the entire 1983 demo plus other rarities from their past.

== Track listing ==
Metalblade 20th Anniversary single disc version
No.	Title	Writer(s)	Length
1.	"Real Swagger"	Joey Vera, John Bush	4:20
2.	"Unstable"	Vera, Bush	4:48
3.	"March of the Saint" (2001 version)	Bush, David Prichard, Gonzo Sandoval, Phil Sandoval, Vera	3:56
4.	"Day of the Eagle" (Robin Trower cover)	Robin Trower	5:33
5.	"Never Satisfied" (Judas Priest cover)	K. K. Downing, Al Atkins	4:35
6.	"Tainted Past" (2001 acoustic version)	Vera, Bush, G. Sandoval	3:14
7.	"After Me, the Flood" (live from the US 2000 Tour Columbus Ohio)	Vera, Bush	5:13
8.	"Creepy Feelings" (live from the US 2000 Tour Columbus Ohio)	Vera, Bush	4:56
9.	"Lesson Well Learned" (From the original 1983 3 song EP)	Bush, Prichard, Sandoval, Sandoval, Vera	2:52
10.	"False Alarm" (From the original 1983 3 song EP)	Bush, Prichard, Sandoval, Sandoval, Vera	4:03
11.	"On the Way" (From the original 1983 3 song EP)	Bush, Prichard, Sandoval, Sandoval, Vera	4:43
12.	"Stricken by Fate" (From the 1983 3 song EP sessions)	Bush, Prichard, Sandoval, Sandoval, Vera	3:29
13.	"Reign of Fire" (From the 1989 24-track demo)	Prichard, Bush	4:15
14.	"Betty '79" (From the 1988 4-track demos)		0:54
15.	"People" (From the 1989 4-track demos)	Vera, Bush	4:08
16.	"Get Lost" (From the 1989 4-track demos)	Vera, Bush	3:41
17.	"Nothing Between the Ears" (From the 1989 4-track demos)	Prichard, Bush	4:28
18.	"Pirates" (From the 1989 4-track demos)	Prichard, Bush, G. Sandoval	3:10
Total length:			72:18

Limited edition version disc 1
No.	Title	Writer(s)	Length
19.	"Medieval Nightmares" (From the 1989 4-track demos)	Vera, Bush	5:02
Total length:			77:20

Limited edition version disc 2
No.	Title	Writer(s)	Length
1.	"You Can Run But You Can't Hide" (From the soundtrack of The Decline of Western Civilization II)	Bush, Prichard, G. Sandoval, Vera	3:03
2.	"Tongue and Cheek" (From the 1989 4-track demos)	G. Sandoval, Vera, Bush	4:48
Total length:			7:16

German version disc 1
No.	Title	Writer(s)	Length
1.	"Real Swagger"	Vera, Bush	4:20
2.	"Unstable"	Vera, Bush	4:48
3.	"March of the Saint" (2001 version)	Bush, Prichard, Sandoval, Sandoval, Vera	3:56
4.	"Day of the Eagle" (Robin Trower cover)	Trower	5:33
5.	"Never Satisfied" (Judas Priest cover)	Downing, Atkins	4:35
6.	"Tainted Past" (2001 acoustic version)	Vera, Bush, G. Sandoval	3:14
7.	"After Me, the Flood" (live from the US 2000 Tour Columbus Ohio)	Vera, Bush	5:13
8.	"Creepy Feelings" (live from the US 2000 Tour Columbus Ohio)	Vera, Bush	4:56
9.	"Lesson Well Learned" (From the original 1983 3 song EP)	Bush, Prichard, Sandoval, Sandoval, Vera	2:52
10.	"False Alarm" (From the original 1983 3 song EP)	Bush, Prichard, Sandoval, Sandoval, Vera	4:03
11.	"On the Way" (From the original 1983 3 song EP)	Bush, Prichard, Sandoval, Sandoval, Vera	4:43
12.	"Stricken by Fate" (From the 1983 3 song EP sessions)	Bush, Prichard, Sandoval, Sandoval, Vera	3:29
Total length:			51:42

German version disc 2
No.	Title	Writer(s)	Length
1.	"You Can Run But You Can't Hide" (From the soundtrack of The Decline of Western Civilization II)	Bush, Prichard, G. Sandoval, Vera	3:03
2.	"Betty '79" (From the 1988 4-track demos)		0:54
3.	"People" (From the 1989 4-track demos)	Vera, Bush	4:08
4.	"Get Lost" (From the 1989 4-track demos)	Vera, Bush	3:41
5.	"Tongue and Cheek" (From the 1989 4-track demos)	G. Sandoval, Vera, Bush	4:13
6.	"Pirates" (From the 1989 4-track demos)	Prichard, Bush, G. Sandoval	3:10
7.	"Medieval Nightmares" (From the 1989 4-track demos)	Vera, Bush	5:02
Total length:			24:04

== Personnel ==
=== Band ===
- John Bush – vocals
- Phil Sandoval – guitars
- Dave Prichard – guitars
- Jeff Duncan – guitars
- Joey Vera – bass
- Gonzo Sandoval – drums

=== Production ===
- Bill Metroyer – producer, engineer
- Joey Vera – producer, mixing
- Armored Saint – producer
- Brian Foraker – producer
- Timothy Powell – engineer
- Steve Hall – mastering
- Brian J. Ames – design
- Al Perez – photography
- Alex Solca – cover art, photography
