= The Spectre Within =

Studio album by Fates Warning
- Released: October 1985
- Studio: Eldorado Recording, Burbank; Track Record, Los Angeles
- Genre: Heavy metal; progressive metal
- Length: 48:20
- Label: Metal Blade
- Producer: Fates Warning, Brian Slagel

Fates Warning chronology
Night on Bröcken (1984)	The Spectre Within (1985)	Awaken the Guardian (1986)

Alternative cover
- 2002 remastered edition

The Spectre Within is the second studio album by progressive metal band Fates Warning, released in October 1985 through Metal Blade Records. It has been reissued three times: first as a double album together with Night on Bröcken (1984) in 1992, followed by a remastered edition in 1994, and again in 2002 with four bonus tracks as well as new cover art.

== Music and lyrics ==
The album's style is predominantly heavy metal, and does not feature the progressive music elements that following releases would have. The album makes heavy use of falsetto singing and harmonized guitar riffs. In the 2010 music history book Mean Deviation: Four Decades of Progressive Heavy Metal, journalist Jeff Wagner stated that the album's sound was "darker and more complex" than bands such as Iron Maiden and Queensrÿche. He said the album's instrumentation consisted of "ham-fisted, second-rate riffs". The album's lyricals explore fantasy-related subject matter such as magic and dragons.

== Critical reception ==
Professional ratings
Review scores
Source	Rating
AllMusic	2/5 stars
Sputnikmusic	3.5/5

Robert Taylor at AllMusic awarded The Spectre Within two stars out of five, saying that "Metal fans may enjoy this more than Night on Bröcken, especially 'Pirates of the Underground' and 'The Apparition', but there is very little, if anything, for the progressive fan." Trey Spencer at Sputnikmusic gave the album a similarly indifferent review, deeming it "for die-hard fans only". Some criticism was directed at John Arch's vocals, that were described as "slightly irritating due to the unchanging high-pitched nature of his voice", as well as the dated riffs and production. For new fans of Fates Warning, Spencer instead recommended their 1986 follow-up Awaken the Guardian as a better starting point.

In contrast, Jeff Wagner in his Mean Deviation (2010: 56) book wrote that The Spectre Within "set Fates Warning apart from just about everyone else in the metal underground, although parallels could be drawn to Danish band Mercyful Fate, an early influence on [guitarist Jim Matheos]".

== Track listing ==
No.	Title	Writer(s)	Length
1.	"Traveler in Time"	Jim Matheos, Victor Arduini, John Arch	7:13
2.	"Orphan Gypsy"	Arduini, Arch	5:59
3.	"Without a Trace"	Arduini, Arch	4:49
4.	"Pirates of the Underground"	Matheos, Arduini, Arch	7:07
5.	"The Apparition"	Matheos, Arch	5:50
6.	"Kyrie Eleison"	Matheos, Arch	5:25
7.	"Epitaph"	Matheos, Arch	11:57
Total length:			48:20

2002 reissue bonus tracks
No.	Title	Length
8.	"Radio Underground (Live Underground)"	6:57
9.	"The Apparition (Rehearsal 1985)"	5:54
10.	"Kyrie Eleison (Demo 1985)"	5:50
11.	"Epitaph (Demo 1985)"	11:54

== Personnel ==
- John Arch – vocals, arrangement, producer
- Victor Arduini – guitar, arrangement, producer
- Jim Matheos – guitar, arrangement, producer
- Jim Arch – keyboard, arrangement
- Steve Zimmerman – drums, arrangement, producer
- Joe DiBiase – bass, arrangement, producter

Production

- Brian Slagel – producer
- Bill Metoyer – engineering
- Carmine Rizzo – engineering
- Brad Vance – remastering (reissue)
- Third Image – artwork
