= Revelation (Armored Saint album) =

Studio album by Armored Saint
- Released: March 7, 2000
- Recorded: The Bridge, Silver Spring, Maryland; Simon's Ghost Studios, Los Angeles
- Genre: Heavy metal
- Length: 62:13
- Label: Metal Blade
- Producer: Joey Vera, Brian Slagel

Armored Saint chronology
Symbol of Salvation (1991)	Revelation (2000)	Nod to the Old School (2001)

Professional ratings
Review scores
Source	Rating
AllMusic	link

Revelation is the fifth studio album by the American heavy metal band Armored Saint. It was released in 2000 on Metal Blade Records. Armored Saint reformed in the entire Symbol of Salvation lineup to record Revelation in 1999 after six years of being disbanded. The result is a traditional heavy metal record and a natural sequel of their previous effort. The limited edition came with a bonus CD including the complete A Trip Thru Red Times video.

"Creepy Feelings", "What's Your Pleasure", and the Japanese bonus track "Shadows" were originally demoed in 1989 with original guitarist Dave Prichard during the writing sessions of what would become the Symbol of Salvation album, but ultimately did not make the cut.

The song "The Pillar" was originally written for the 1992 horror film Hellraiser III: Hell on Earth where the band makes a cameo appearance as a bar band performing the song "Hanging Judge" at the 'Boiler Room' club.

== Track listing ==
No.	Title	Writer(s)	Length
1.	"Pay Dirt"	Vera, Bush	4:12
2.	"The Pillar"	Vera, Bush	4:58
3.	"After Me, The Flood"	Vera, Bush	5:07
4.	"Tension"	Vera, Bush	5:23
5.	"Creepy Feelings"	Vera, Bush	5:21
6.	"Damaged"	Duncan, Vera, Bush	6:29
7.	"Den of Thieves"	Duncan, Vera, Bush	6:03
8.	"Control Issues"	Vera, Bush	6:20
9.	"No Me Digas"	Vera, Duncan, G. Sandoval, Bush	5:06
10.	"Deep Rooted Anger"	P. Sandoval, Duncan, Vera, Bush	5:19
11.	"What's Your Pleasure"	Prichard, Vera, Bush, G. Sandoval	3:04
12.	"Upon My Departure"	Duncan, Vera, Bush	4:40

=== Bonus tracks (Japanese version) ===
No.	Title	Writer(s)	Length
13.	"Shadows"	Prichard, Bush	5:42

== Personnel ==
Band members

- John Bush – vocals
- Phil Sandoval – guitars
- Jeff Duncan – guitars
- Joey Vera – bass, percussion, sequencing
- Gonzo Sandoval – drums, percussion

Additional musician

- Jon Saxon – percussion

Production

- Joey Vera – production, engineering
- Bill Metoyer – mixing
- Brad Winslow – assistant mixing
- Matt Quave – assistant mixing
- Mitch Rellas – engineering
- Eddy Schreyer – mastering
- Brian Slagel – executive production
- Wayne Douglas Barlowe – cover art
- Alex Solca – photography
