= John Bush (singer) =

American heavy metal singer

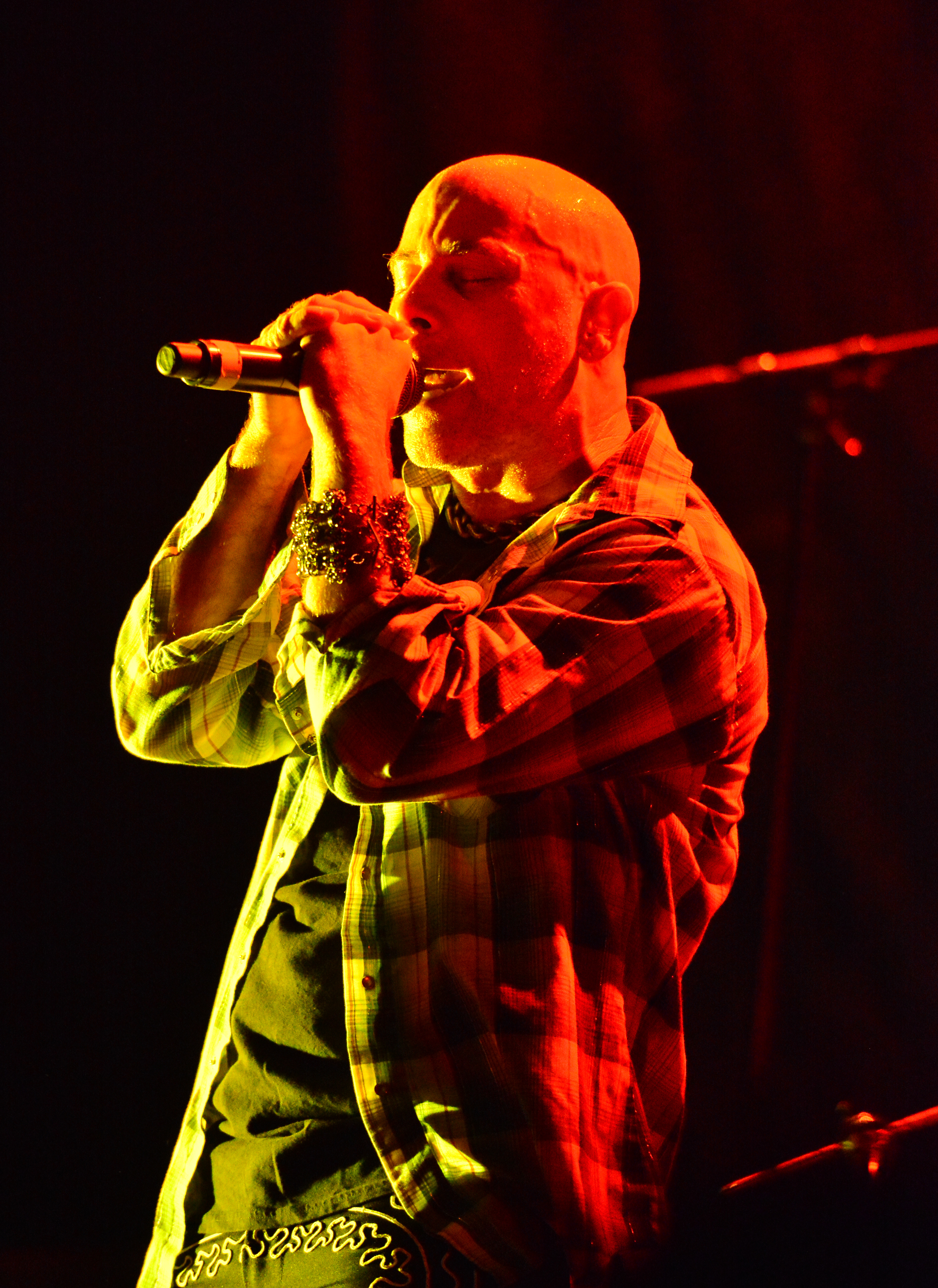
- Bush performing with Armored Saint in 2015

Background information
- Born: August 24, 1963 (age 62); Los Angeles, California, U.S.
- Genres: Heavy metal
- Occupations: Singer, songwriter
- Years active: 1982–present
- Member of: Armored Saint, Category 7
- Formerly of: Anthrax, Stone Soldier
- Website: armoredsaint.com

John Bush (born August 24, 1963) is an American heavy metal singer. He came to prominence in the 1980s as the lead singer and lyricist of Armored Saint, a heavy metal band from Los Angeles, California. In 1992, he joined thrash metal band Anthrax, with whom he remained until 2005 and briefly rejoined in 2009–2010. Bush has also been active with the reformed Armored Saint intermittently from 1999 to the present, and involved with other projects such as Metal Allegiance and Category 7.

Eduardo Rivadavia of AllMusic praised Bush's "remarkable voice" while authors Howie Abrams and Sacha Jenkins ranked him as the eighth-best vocalist in the genre.

== Career ==
Bush started his singing career at Woodrow Wilson High School (Los Angeles) in 1979, fronting a short-lived rock band called "Royal Decree", with brothers Felipe "Phil" Sandoval (lead guitar) and Gonzalo "Gonzo" Sandoval (drums), and bassist Joey Vera, also Woodrow Wilson High School alumni. In 1982, they all became founding members of Armored Saint, along with new lead guitarist Dave Prichard, from South Pasadena High School.

In 1984, Bush had a cameo appearance in the Huey Lewis and the News video "The Heart of Rock & Roll" at the 1:38 mark (exiting from the limo).

=== 1982–1992, 1999–present: Armored Saint ===
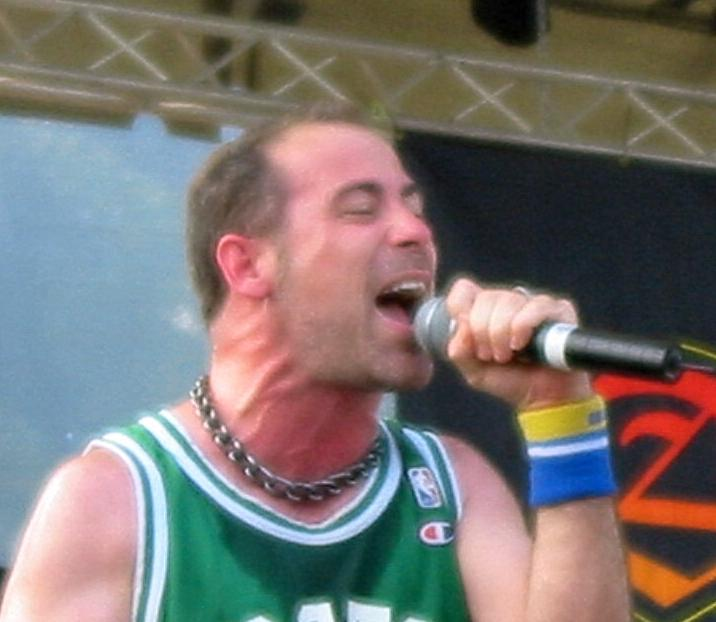
Bush with Armored Saint in 2006

Since their formation in 1982, Armored Saint has released eight full-length albums, one EP, a live album, a greatest hits compilation and two DVDs, all with Bush on vocals.

In the early 1980s, Bush was invited by Metallica to join them as lead singer. Even after the release of Kill 'Em All, Metallica vocalist James Hetfield felt unsure about his own singing abilities. Hetfield wanted to concentrate on his guitar and personally asked Bush to join Metallica. Bush was the only vocalist that the band considered as a potential frontman. He turned down the offer as he wanted to stay with Armored Saint, due in part to wanting to remain loyal to his longtime friends in Armored Saint.

In 1990, original Armored Saint guitarist Dave Prichard died of leukemia during the recording of Symbol of Salvation. Jeff Duncan replaced Prichard and the band finished the recording of Symbol of Salvation, going out on tour afterwards. The band decided that they did not want to continue without Prichard, and amicably disbanded.

In 1999, whilst Bush was a member of Anthrax, he got together with Armored Saint bassist Joey Vera. Together they decided to bring back the Symbol of Salvation lineup for an Armored Saint reunion. The resultant album Revelation was released in 2000 and a short tour followed. The following year, Armored Saint released a collection of demos, live tracks and other rarities in the two-disc package Nod to the Old School. They have since released three more studio albums, La Raza in 2010, Win Hands Down in 2015, and Punching the Sky in 2020.

=== 1992–2005, 2009–2010: Anthrax ===
Following the 1992 dissolution of Armored Saint, Bush received a call from Scott Ian of Anthrax, who offered Bush the chance to fill the spot left behind by singer Joey Belladonna, who had been fired from the band. Bush accepted and joined the band, adding alternative rock sensibilities. Anthrax recorded Sound of White Noise, Stomp 442, and Volume 8: The Threat Is Real with Bush in the 90s before entering a temporary hiatus during 1999. Despite Bush's reunion with Armored Saint during that same year, Bush remained a member of Anthrax. Returning to the band, Bush recorded vocals for his fourth album with the band, the critically acclaimed We've Come for You All in 2003. The successful WCFYA tour was documented with a live album/DVD titled Music of Mass Destruction. In 2004, Anthrax released The Greater of Two Evils, a re-recording of several of the band's more popular songs from the pre-Bush era with the then-current lineup.

In early 2005, Anthrax issued a press release stating that the band's Among the Living lineup was reuniting. Anthrax stated that Bush had not been fired, but with Joey Belladonna's return and talk of a new album in the works, it was unclear if Bush would record with them again. However, Joey Belladonna's exit from Anthrax in January 2007 fueled reports that Bush would return. However, Anthrax chose to recruit a new vocalist, Dan Nelson. In June 2007, Bush stated during an interview that he was not bitter about the split with Anthrax, revealing that they had asked him to take part in the reunion tour, which would have seen him and Belladonna splitting vocal duties, but that he turned it down because "it just wasn't right" for him. He was later approached again by the band to re-join following Belladonna's exit, which he again turned down, explaining: "I couldn't go back and say, 'Here I am...' It would be like coming in with my tail between my legs, and that's not right for me. I just couldn't do that. It just didn't feel right to do that. It was about soul, your gut. How does that feel? Does it feel right? Good enough. Sold. Answer."

In August 2009, after Anthrax parted ways with their replacement singer Dan Nelson, Bush rejoined his former bandmates in Anthrax for a live performance on August 1, 2009, at the Sonisphere Festival in Knebworth, England. Following this performance, there were many calls for him to return full-time. Bush also performed with Anthrax at the Loud Park '09 Festival in Japan on October 17, 2009, followed by five concerts on the Soundwave tour in Australia in February 2010.

On December 14, 2009, it was announced that the "Big Four" thrash bands would play in Poland and Czech Republic during the following year, among several other shows during the Sonisphere festival. It was expected that Anthrax would continue with Bush, but the other members ultimately chose to reunite with Joey Belladonna, as Bush was not up for recommitting to the group full-time. The band has since toured and recorded again with Belladonna.

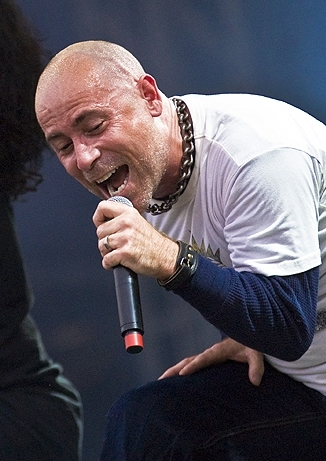
Bush in 2009

In September 2015, Bush caused some minor controversy after he went public concerning royalty issues with Anthrax, explaining: "they've had a lot of — a lot — of accounting and management issues that were affecting me personally. Dan Spitz has an issue with the band [...] he feels like he hasn't been paid by the band. And the dude made seven records with Anthrax. And the dude should be paid on those records that he made with the band. [...] It's, like, I'm out there signing Anthrax records I made. I just wanna be paid for the records [that were] made and sold. And it gives me pride in those records. And then when you don't [get paid], you become very bitter about it, and it's not cool." He did reveal however that the band had a new accounting company and that "they seem to be on the up and up now."

Nevertheless, he was forced to respond to his comments on Armored Saint's Facebook page after fans criticised Anthrax for not paying Bush, admitting that "In hindsight I would have preferred to keep this between myself and the members of Anthrax." and clarifying that he had received royalties from the band though they had been "inconsistent", before declaring himself "Done with this topic."

=== 2005–2019: Side projects ===
Bush has done commercial voiceovers for the fast food chain Burger King.

In April 2011, German instrumental rock band Long Distance Calling released a self-titled full-length album, which features John Bush performing vocals for the track "Middleville". "Middleville" is the only track with vocals on that album.

In December 2011, Metallica performed a 30th anniversary show with several guests, including Bush who joined Metallica onstage to perform "The Four Horsemen", a song from Kill 'Em All in which Bush took the lead vocal just as Hetfield had wanted him to do almost three decades prior. After the performance, drummer Lars Ulrich took the microphone to say "It could have been a whole different story," then added in amazement at Bush's performance: "Wow!"

Bush provided vocals for the 2013 action video game Metal Gear Rising: Revengeance. He is featured on the tracks "Return to Ashes" and "The Hot Wind Blowing". Bush performed vocals for the track "Bound by Silence" from Metal Allegiance's 2018 album Volume II – Power Drunk Majesty. He appeared on the 2019 David Ellefson album Sleeping Giants, supplying lead vocals for the track "If You Were God".

== Personal life ==
Bush is married to Tori and has a daughter and a son.

== Discography ==
=== with Armored Saint ===
- March of the Saint (1984)
- Delirious Nomad (1985)
- Raising Fear (1987)
- Symbol of Salvation (1991)
- Revelation (2000)
- La Raza (2010)
- Win Hands Down (2015)
- Punching the Sky (2020)
- Emotion Factory Reset (2026)

=== with Anthrax ===
- Sound of White Noise (1993)
- Stomp 442 (1995)
- Volume 8: The Threat Is Real (1998)
- We've Come for You All (2003)
- The Greater of Two Evils (2004)

=== with Category 7 ===
- Category 7 (2024)
