= Armored Saint =

American heavy metal band

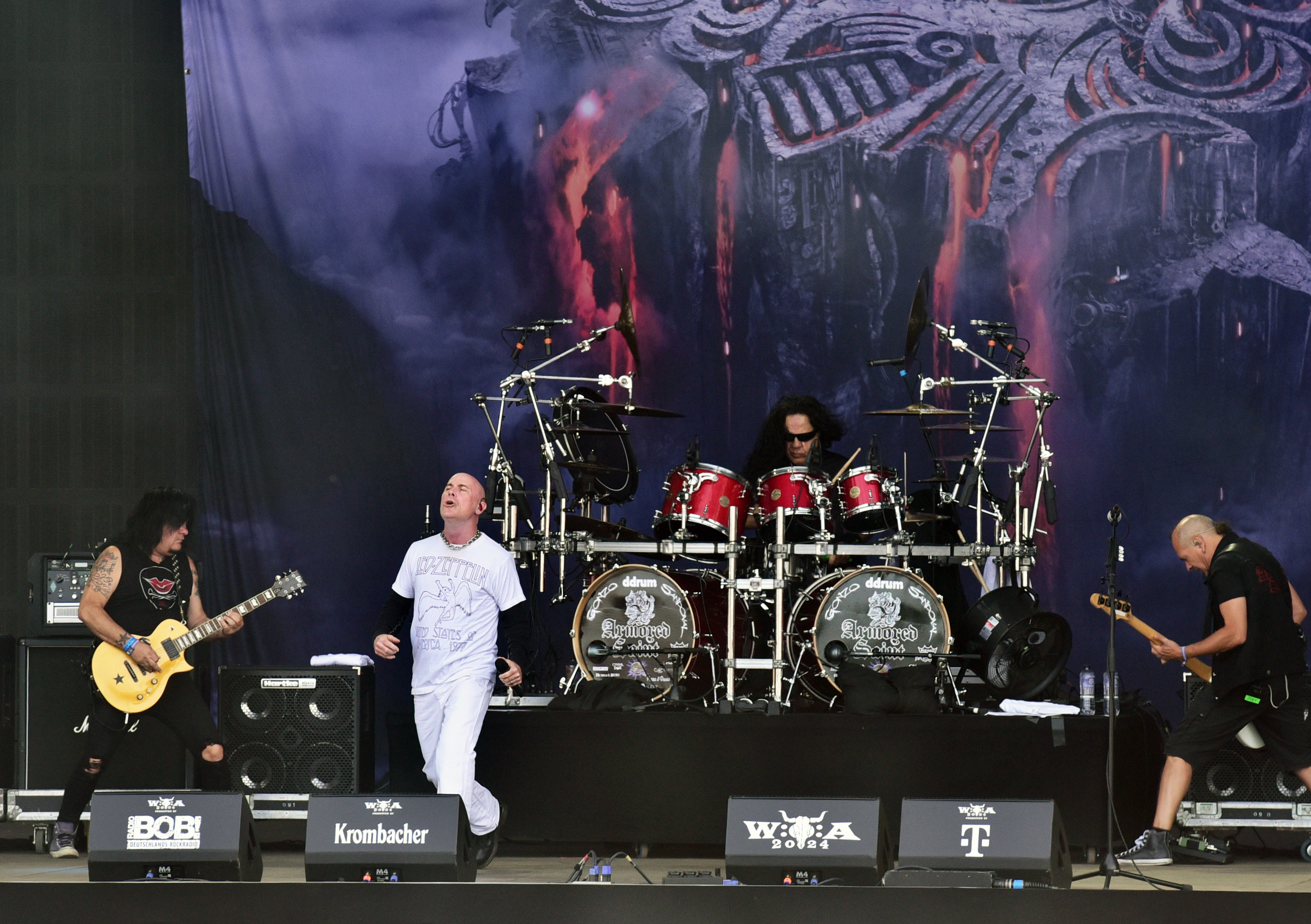
- Armored Saint at Wacken Open Air 2024

Background information
- Origin: Los Angeles, California, U.S.
- Genre: Heavy metal
- Years active: 1982–1992, 1999–2003, 2008–present
- Labels: Metal Blade; Chrysalis
- Members: John Bush; Joey Vera; Jeff Duncan; Gonzo Sandoval; Phil Sandoval
- Past members: Mike Zaputil; Mike Williams; Dave Prichard; Eddie Livingston; Alan Barlam
- Website: armoredsaint.com

Armored Saint is an American heavy metal band formed in Los Angeles, California in 1982. Since 1990, the band has consisted of John Bush on lead vocals, Joey Vera on bass, Jeff Duncan on guitar and the Sandoval brothers (Gonzo and Phil) on drums and guitar, respectively. Of the current lineup, Bush and Vera are the two constant members. To date, the band has released nine studio albums, one EP, two live albums and one compilation album.

As one of the leaders of the Los Angeles heavy metal scene, Armored Saint achieved moderate success during the 1980s with their 1983 self-titled EP and first three studio albums: March of the Saint (1984), Delirious Nomad (1985) and Raising Fear (1987). Prior to the release of their fourth studio album Symbol of Salvation (1991), the band was plagued by extended inactivity, due to record company issues and the death of their original guitarist Dave Prichard, who died of leukemia in 1990. Armored Saint eventually disbanded when Bush joined Anthrax in 1992 to replace Joey Belladonna, but reunited in 1999, and has since continued to tour and record.

== History ==
=== Early career (1982–1989) ===
Armored Saint was formed in 1982 by brothers Felipe "Phil" Sandoval (guitar) and Gonzalo "Gonzo" Sandoval (drums), from Woodrow Wilson High School (Los Angeles), along with guitarist Dave Prichard (from nearby South Pasadena High School), singer John Bush, and bassist Joey Vera, also Woodrow Wilson High School alumni. (Phil, Gonzo, John and Joey had originally played together during high school in a short lived rock band called "Royal Decree"); Gonzo Sandoval claims to have conceived the band name "Armored Saint", after watching the movie Excalibur at a local movie theater parking lot in Monterey Park, California. In 1983, John Bush was invited by drummer Lars Ulrich to audition as singer for Metallica following the release of their debut album, Kill 'Em All, as frontman James Hetfield was not confident in his own singing abilities and wanted to focus on playing guitar. However, Bush turned down the offer as he wanted to remain in Armored Saint. Armored Saint recorded a five-song demo that landed the song "Lesson Well Learned" on the compilation album Metal Massacre II. Three of these demo songs were then used for the band's self-titled EP on Metal Blade Records in 1983. The group then signed with Chrysalis Records in 1984.

Armored Saint released their debut album March of the Saint in 1984. The debut album yielded a minor MTV hit with "Can U Deliver?". During the recording of their second album, Delirious Nomad, guitarist Phil Sandoval left the group. Their third album, Raising Fear, was recorded by the remaining four members. In 1986, during the recording sessions for the album, Metallica contacted Joey Vera to replace bassist Cliff Burton after his untimely death. Vera turned down this offer as he wanted to stay in Armored Saint, and Burton was eventually replaced by Jason Newsted of Flotsam and Jetsam. Throughout the 1980s, Armored Saint toured, or played selected shows, with many acts such as Judas Priest, Metallica, Aerosmith, Whitesnake, Ted Nugent, Alice Cooper, Saxon, Ratt, Testament, Exodus, W.A.S.P., Dio, Accept, Fates Warning, Y&T, Grim Reaper, Malice, King Diamond, Great White, Stryper, Leatherwolf, Lizzy Borden, Savatage, Helloween and Danzig. By the end of the decade, however, the band was unhappy with their lack of success on the Chrysalis label, and returned to Metal Blade. Soon after the release of their first live album Saints Will Conquer and a short-lived lineup that included Alan Barlam (then-guitarist for Hellion), Armored Saint added Jeff Duncan, formerly of the L.A. club band Odin, as guitarist, while Gonzo Sandoval briefly left the band and was replaced by Eddie Livingston.

=== Death of Dave Prichard, Symbol of Salvation and split (1989–1998) ===
In 1989, while writing and recording rough four-track demos for their next studio album, guitarist Dave Prichard was diagnosed with leukemia. Prichard succumbed to the disease on February 27, 1990, shortly before the recording sessions of Symbol of Salvation began. After a brief hiatus, the Sandoval brothers returned to the band and Phil resumed guitar duties to replace Prichard. Symbol of Salvation was released in 1991 to widespread critical success. It featured two hits "Reign of Fire" and "Last Train Home". The album was dedicated to the spirit and memory of Dave Prichard, whose solo on the demo recording of the song "Tainted Past" was painstakingly and carefully transferred and used on the album. The tour for Symbol of Salvation was successful; they opened for Suicidal Tendencies on their Lights...Camera...Revolution! tour and Savatage on their Streets tour. They also toured with the Scorpions, Wrathchild America, Sepultura and Overkill.

In 1992, the band contributed the song "Hanging Judge" to the Hellraiser III: Hell on Earth soundtrack, as well as made a brief appearance in the film. Several months later, John Bush was offered the position of lead vocalist in the thrash band Anthrax. Unsure of Armored Saint's future, Bush accepted the job. The Sandoval brothers attempted to audition new members to create a new chapter, yet after many failed attempts, Armored Saint was officially disbanded.

After Armored Saint disbanded, Joey Vera kept busy playing with such bands as Fates Warning, Lizzy Borden and Chroma Key. He released a solo album in 1994 and started a successful second career as a producer and engineer. The Sandoval brothers formed Life After Death. Life after Death released a self titled record on the now defunct John Sutherland record label Indivision, and released the record on the now-defunct European label Rising Sun, and Jeff Duncan formed DC4 with brothers Shawn and Matt, and former Dio guitarist Rowan Robertson.

=== Reunion (1999–present) ===
In 1999, with Anthrax on temporary hiatus, John Bush and Joey Vera decided to reform Armored Saint. The entire Symbol of Salvation lineup returned to the studio, and in 2000 the album Revelation was released. It included the band's first song with Spanish lyrics, written by Gonzo Sandoval & John Bush "No Me Digas". A small club tour opening for Dio and Lynch Mob followed.

The following year, the band released Nod to the Old School, a collection of rarities, demos and outtakes (many from the Prichard years), plus a few new tracks. Soon after, John Bush returned to the studio with Anthrax, and Armored Saint was once again placed on indefinite hiatus.

In 2004, Vera rejoined Bush in Anthrax on a temporary basis, filling in for bassist Frank Bello. Early in 2005, Anthrax's Scott Ian announced that their classic Among the Living-era lineup was reforming, leaving the membership of Bush and Vera in question. Bush stated his involvement with Anthrax was over.

This move gave hope to many that Armored Saint would once again record. A one-off show with the Revelation lineup took place in 2005, and in 2006 the band embarked on a new tour.

As part of their 20th anniversary, Metal Blade released a three-CD special edition of Symbol of Salvation in 2003. This contains the original CD, a second CD of demos of the songs plus the first part of an interview of the band members by Metal Blade founder Brian Slagel. The third CD contains the second half of that interview. Also reissued was the band's long out of print live video A Trip Thru Red Times.

The band released their sixth album titled La Raza on March 16, 2010.

On December 7, 2011, the band was invited to play one of four shows at the 30th anniversary of Metallica. The show took place in San Francisco, California.

On February 11, 2013, Vera officially announced via Facebook and Twitter that the band had begun working on their seventh studio album. The album, titled Win Hands Down, was released on June 2, 2015. Win Hands Down debuted at number 183 on the Billboard Top 200 chart. The album sold double what their previous effort, La Raza, sold upon its release in 2010. The album also reached number 33 on the German Top 100 albums charts.

On February 24, 2017, Armored Saint released their first live album in 29 years, Carpe Noctum.

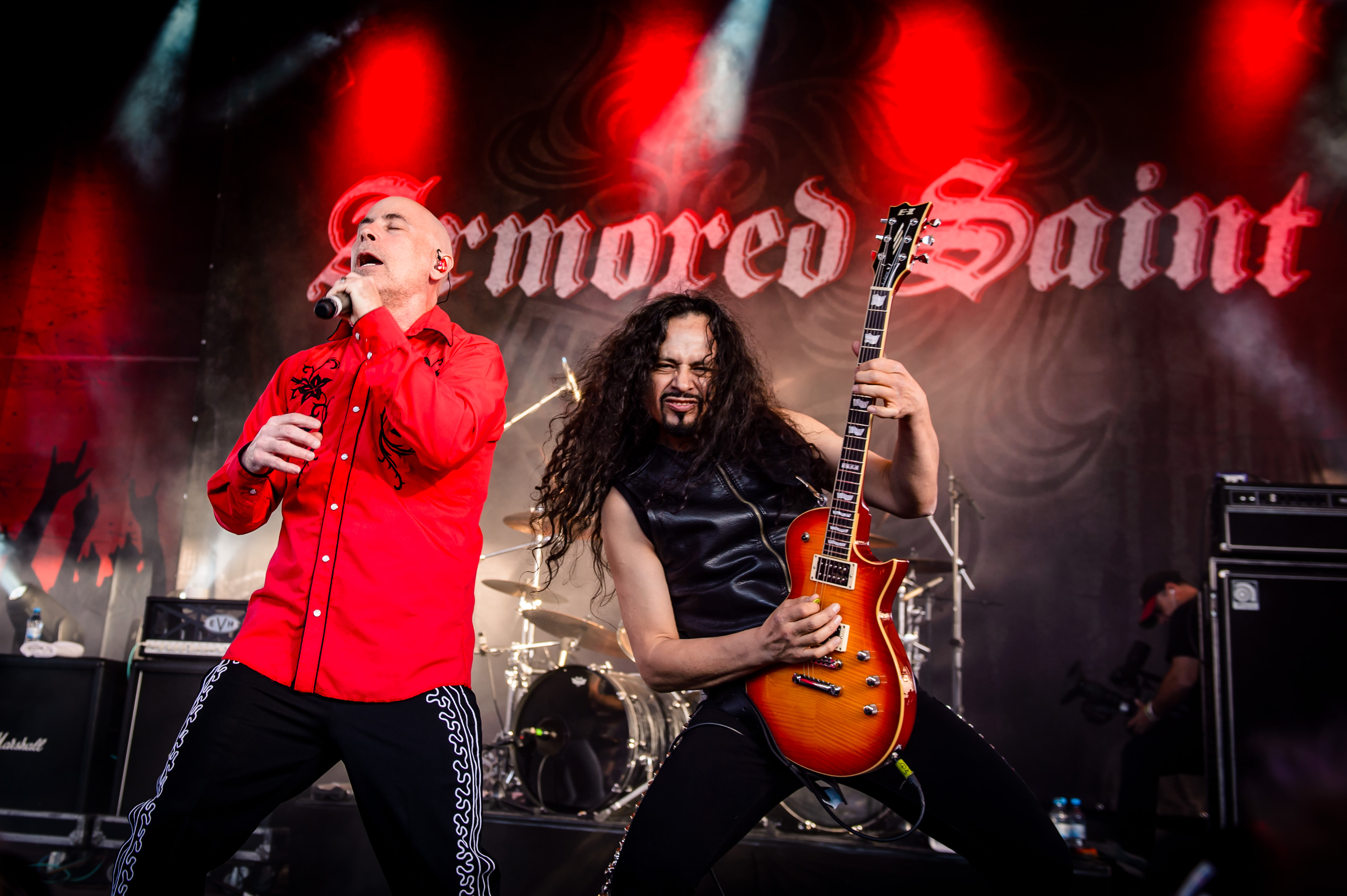
Armored Saint performing at Hard Rock Festival 2018 in Germany

When asked in March 2017 about the follow-up to Win Hands Down, Bush stated, "We haven't really collectively started working on anything. Sure, all the guys are accumulating some stuff in their minds. I have a lot of lyrical ideas written down, but we haven't started writing any songs yet. Armored Saint, sometimes, we don't move at the quickest pace. I think it would be a good idea if we wanted to make a new record to move on it a little quicker. I've said numerous times I'd rather have the quality of the material than feeling pressured to put out something in a certain amount of time be the primary motivation for it. That being said, we're no spring chickens, I ain't going to lie. Trying to wait ten years, five years for a new record, it's probably a little bit too long. If we do make a new record and if we can try to make the material be as high quality as Win Hands Down, then it would be cool to be able to get something out sooner than later. That being said, we haven't worked on anything yet."

On May 23, 2019, Armored Saint announced on their Instagram page that they had begun writing and demoing songs for their eighth studio album. The band began recording the album that December and completed mixing it in April of the following year for a late 2020 release. The resulting album, titled Punching the Sky, was released on October 23, 2020. Metal Hammer named it the 33rd-best metal album of 2020.

In October 2020, Armored Saint released a teaser trailer to their documentary "Armored Saint: The Movie" which includes appearances from such as James Hetfield from Metallica and Scott Ian from Anthrax.

In a July 2023 interview, Bush confirmed that he and Vera had "started writing some songs a little bit" for the next Armored Saint album. The band began entered "undisclosed location" in January 2024 to record their cover version of People!'s "One Chain (Don't Make No Prison)", which was released as a one-off single that June. In April 2025, Armored Saint announced plans to enter the studio in May to begin recording their ninth album for a spring 2026 release. The band performed at the Sonic Temple music festival in Columbus, Ohio in May 2025.

On March 24, 2026, Armored Saint announced that their ninth album, Emotion Factory Reset, was set to be released on May 22. The band toured in support of the album by performing at Milwaukee Metal Fest in June 2026, and touring Europe with Testament in the summer. They will also co-headline two North American tours with Metal Church, with the first leg to take place in November 2026 and second in March and April 2027.

== Band members ==
Current members

- John Bush – lead vocals (1982–1992, 1999–2002, 2008–present)
- Gonzo Sandoval – drums, backing vocals (1982–1989, 1990–1992, 1999–2002, 2008–present)
- Phil Sandoval – guitar (1982–1985, 1990–1992, 1999–2002, 2008–present)
- Joey Vera – bass, backing vocals (1982–1992, 1999–2002, 2008–present)
- Jeff Duncan – guitar, backing vocals (1989–1992, 1999–2002, 2008–present

Former members

- Mike Zaputil – bass (1982)
- Mike Williams – bass (1982)
- Dave Prichard – guitar, backing vocals (1982–1990; his death)
- Eddie Livingston – drums (1989–1990)
- Alan Barlam – guitar (1989)

Timeline

== Discography ==
=== Albums ===
All studio albums listed, unless otherwise noted.

Year	Title	Label	Other information
1983	Armored Saint EP	Metal Blade	Three-song EP
1984	March of the Saint	Chrysalis	
1985	Delirious Nomad	Chrysalis	
1987	Raising Fear	Chrysalis	
1988	Saints Will Conquer	Metal Blade	Live album
1991	Symbol of Salvation	Metal Blade	
2000	Revelation	Metal Blade	
2001	Nod to the Old School	Metal Blade	A few new tracks plus rarities, demos and live material
2010	La Raza	Metal Blade	
2015	Win Hands Down	Metal Blade	
2017	Carpe Noctum	Metal Blade	Live album
2020	Punching the Sky	Metal Blade	
2021	Symbol of Salvation: Live	Metal Blade	Live version of Symbol of Salvation played in its entirety.
2026	Emotion Factory Reset	Metal Blade	

=== Other appearances ===
Year	Title	Label	Other information
1982	Metal Massacre II	Metal Blade	Compilation featuring "Lesson Well Learned"
1985	Crazed – An All Out Metal Assault	JSI (Jelto Concepts Incorporated) Records	Compilation of various metal bands featuring "Can U Deliver"
1987	Metal Blade Records 15th Anniversary Double CD	Metal Blade	CD1 Track 1 // Warzone ~ CD2 Track 6 // Lesson Well Learned
1988	The Decline of Western Civilization Part II (soundtrack)	Capitol/I.R.S.	Soundtrack to the movie of the same title. Featuring "You Can Run..."
2018	DC4	HighVolMusic	John Bush co-vocals on "Baba O'Riley"
1996	Metalmeister	Metal Blade	Compilation featuring "Creepy Feelings"

=== Videos/DVDs ===
Year	Title	Label	Other information
1991	A Trip Thru Red Times	Chrysalis	Live bootleg video; re-released by Metal Blade in 2003
1992	Hellraiser III		
2004	Lessons NOT Well Learned 1991-2001	Metal Blade	
2021	Symbol of Salvation: Live	Metal Blade	Live video of Symbol of Salvation played in its entirety.
