= Symbol of Salvation =

Studio album by Armored Saint
- Released: May 14, 1991
- Recorded: 1989 (Dave Prichard's guitar solo on "Tainted Past"); 1990–1991
- Genre: Heavy metal
- Length: 55:48
- Label: Metal Blade
- Producer: Dave Jerden

Armored Saint chronology
| Saints Will Conquer (1988) | Symbol of Salvation (1991) | Revelation (2000) |

2003 reissue cover

Symbol of Salvation is the fourth album by American heavy metal band Armored Saint, released in 1991 on Metal Blade Records. It was their first release with rhythm guitarist Jeff Duncan and their last album before going on an extended hiatus that would last until 1999. The songs on this album were written and demoed in 1988 and 1989 with original lead guitarist Dave Prichard (except "Truth Always Hurts"), who died of leukemia in 1990 prior to recording. The first guitar solo on "Tainted Past" was lifted from a 1989 4-track demo recorded by Prichard. The album was produced by Dave Jerden, who had produced Alice in Chains and Jane's Addiction albums beforehand. Jerden would go on to produce vocalist John Bush's first album with Anthrax, Sound of White Noise in 1993.

The track "Hanging Judge" was featured in the 1992 horror film Hellraiser III: Hell on Earth, which also featured a cameo appearance of Armored Saint in a nightclub scene.

== Reception ==
Professional ratings
Review scores
| Source | Rating |
|---|---|
| AllMusic | 4.5/5 stars |
| Rock Hard | 9.5/10 |

In 2005, Symbol of Salvation was ranked number 424 in Rock Hard's book The 500 Greatest Rock & Metal Albums of All Time. Loudwire listed it as one of the greatest releases on Metal Blade Records in 2017.

== Track listing ==
| No. | Title | Lyrics | Music | Length |
|---|---|---|---|---|
| 1. | "Reign of Fire" | John Bush | David Prichard | 3:57 |
| 2. | "Dropping Like Flies" | Bush | Prichard | 4:39 |
| 3. | "Last Train Home" | Bush | Jeff Duncan | 5:19 |
| 4. | "Tribal Dance" | Bush | Prichard, Joey Vera, Gonzo Sandoval | 4:07 |
| 5. | "The Truth Always Hurts" | Bush | Phil Sandoval, Duncan | 4:20 |
| 6. | "Half Drawn Bridge" | Instrumental | Vera | 1:27 |
| 7. | "Another Day" | Bush | Prichard | 5:32 |
| 8. | "Symbol of Salvation" | Bush, G. Sandoval | Duncan, Vera | 4:36 |
| 9. | "Hanging Judge" | Bush | Prichard | 3:45 |
| 10. | "Warzone" | Bush | Prichard | 3:38 |
| 11. | "Burning Question" | Bush | Prichard | 4:18 |
| 12. | "Tainted Past" | Bush, G. Sandoval, Vera | Vera | 7:04 |
| 13. | "Spineless" | Bush, Duncan | Vera, Prichard | 4:16 |
| Total length: | | | | 57:04 |

== 2003 reissue ==
In 2003, Metal Blade Records remastered and re-released the album as a three-disc special edition. In addition to the full 13-song track list, the first disc contains the music videos to "Reign of Fire" and "Last Train Home". The second disc contains the original 1989 four-track demos (the same demos that the solo of "Tainted Past" came from) of every song from the album (except the instrumental "Half Drawn Bridge"), all which feature original guitarist Dave Prichard. The remainder of the second disc is the first half of a retrospective interview with the band and Metal Blade CEO Brian Slagel, and the third disc contains the second half of the same interview.

== Personnel ==
- John Bush – vocals
- Phil Sandoval – guitars
- Jeff Duncan – guitars, backing vocals
- Joey Vera – bass, backing vocals
- Gonzo Sandoval – drums, percussion
- Dave Prichard – first guitar solo on "Tainted Past"

== Solos ==
- Reign Of Fire: 1st solo: Phil; 2nd solo: Jeff.
- Dropping Like Flies: 1st solo: Phil; 2nd solo: Jeff.
- Last Train Home solos: Jeff.
- Tribal Dance: 1st solo: Phil; 2nd solo: Jeff.
- The Truth Always Hurts: 1st solo: Phil; 2nd solo: Jeff.
- Half Drawn Bridge: 1st solo: Phil; 2nd solo: Jeff.
- Another Day: 1st solo: Phil; 2nd solo: Jeff.
- Symbol Of Salvation: 1st solo: Jeff; 2nd solo: Phil.
- Hanging Judge solos: Jeff.
- Warzone: 1st solo: Jeff; 2nd solo: Phil.
- Burning Question: 1st solo: Jeff; 2nd solo: Phil.
- Tainted Past: 1st solo: D. Prichard; 2nd solo: Phil.
- Spineless: 1st solo: Jeff; 2nd solo: Phil.
