= Jeff Duncan (musician) =

American guitarist

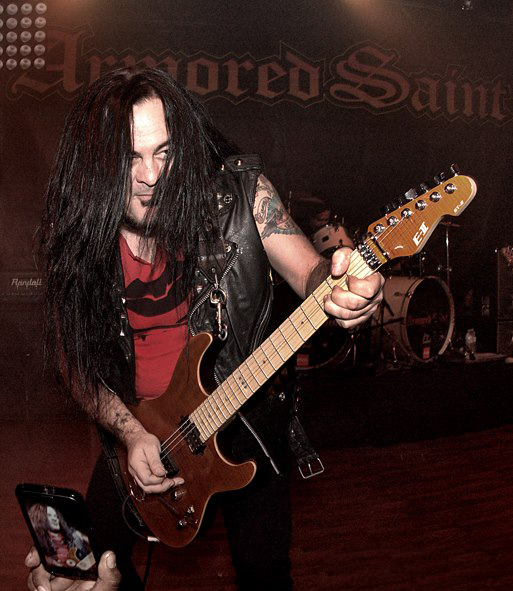
- Duncan performing with Armored Saint

Background information
- Born: January 28, 1966 (age 60); United States
- Genres: Heavy metal
- Occupation: Musician
- Instrument: Guitar
- Member of: Armored Saint, DC4
- Formerly of: Bird of Prey, Odin

Jeff Duncan (born January 28, 1966) is an American heavy metal musician, best known for being a guitarist of Armored Saint and previously Odin. He currently also plays in DC4.

== Biography ==
Duncan got his start in the Los Angeles-based band Odin alongside brother Shawn Duncan on drums. The band self-released the three-song EP Caution! in 1983, followed by the six-song mini-LP, Don't Take No for an Answer, on the local Half-Wet label in 1985. A promotional video was shot for the song "Shining Love." Odin would sign a deal with RCA/Victor for the Japan only release of their 1987 full-length debut, Fight For Your Life. The band infamously appeared in the 1988 documentary, The Decline of Western Civilization Part II: The Metal Years, and issued another six-song mini-LP, The Gods Must Be Crazy, that same year before breaking up. Duncan would contribute lead guitar on the 1990 Lost and Found album by Lostboys, a new band fronted by former Odin vocalist Randy O. He also appeared in the promotional video for the song "Cryin' Out."

In 1989, Duncan joined Armored Saint and made his recording debut on 1991's Symbol of Salvation, co-writing several songs, including the MTV video/single, "Last Train Home." Duncan remains a member to this day and has been part of every subsequent Armored Saint release.

When Armored Saint temporarily broke up after vocalist John Bush accepted an offer to join Anthrax in 1992, Duncan formed the band Bird of Prey which also featured former Ravage vocalist Kyle Michaels, bassist Paul Puljiz (ex-Stone Soldier), and Shawn Duncan on drums. They recorded the L·T·D (Live to DAT) 8-song cassette in 1993, which received distribution in Germany. The band recorded another five-song demo, with Matt Duncan replacing Puljiz on bass, before eventually morphing into DC4 (DC = Duncan Clan) whose initial line-up comprised all three Duncan brothers, with Jeff now handling lead vocal and guitar duties, and former Grave Danger guitarist, Hyland Church. They debuted in 1995 with the self-released Mood Swings EP. The current DC4 is composed of Jeff, Shawn and Matt Duncan and former Dio and Violets Demise guitarist, Rowan Robertson.

In addition, Duncan plays guitar for the Dizzy Reed Band, and Dizzy Reed has played keyboards for DC4.

Duncan also plays in and around Las Vegas, where he currently resides, and occasionally makes appearances in the Vegas Valley at Sin City Sinners shows. He is currently playing shows with Armored Saint, DC4, and the Las-Vegas based band, The Bones, featuring Sean Koos (ex-Joan Jett & The Blackhearts), Patrick Vitagliano (ex-John Connelly's Nuclear Theory), and brother Shawn Duncan. At one point he was also in a band called The Thornbirds, which also included Russ Parrish and Darren Leader from Steel Panther as well as bass player Dean Cameron.

Duncan and Odin would reunite for the first time in 2003 and have performed live as recently as 2018 in conjunction with the re-release of Don't Take No for an Answer and Fight For Your Life on Dave Ellefson's EMP label.

Duncan's first solo album, Wanderlust, saw a digital release in late 2019 by Warrant's Erik Turner and Jerry Dixon on their Downboys label. A CD version of the album was set for April 2020 through EMP, with a limited edition vinyl release scheduled for July.

== Albums ==
Year	Band	Title	Label	Other information
1983	Odin	Caution	Independent	Three-song EP
1985	Odin	Don't Take No for an Answer	Half-Wet Records	
1987	Odin	Fight for Your Life	RCA/Victor Records	
1988	Odin	The Gods Must Be Crazy	Independent	
1990	Lostboys	Lost and Found	Atlantic Records	
1991	Armored Saint	Symbol of Salvation	Metal Blade/Warner Bros. Records	
1993	Bird of Prey	L·T·D	Independent	Cassette
1995	DC4	Mood Swings	Independent	
1998	DC4	Volume I	Rising Sun Records	
2000	Armored Saint	Revelation	Metal Blade Records	
2002	Armored Saint	Nod to the Old School	Metal Blade Records	
2009	DC4	Explode	Chavis Records	
2010	Armored Saint	La Raza	Metal Blade Records	
2013	The Bones	What Would Ginger Do?	Independent	
2014	The Bones	Ruin Your Rockshow Live	Independent	Live album of covers
2015	The Bones	Dirty Pretty Things	Independent	
2015	Armored Saint	Win Hands Down	Metal Blade Records	
2017	Armored Saint	Carpe Noctum	Metal Blade Records	Live album
2019	Jeff Duncan	Wanderlust	Downboys (digital) / EMP (physical)	Instrumental album
