= Joey Vera =

American bassist (born 1963)

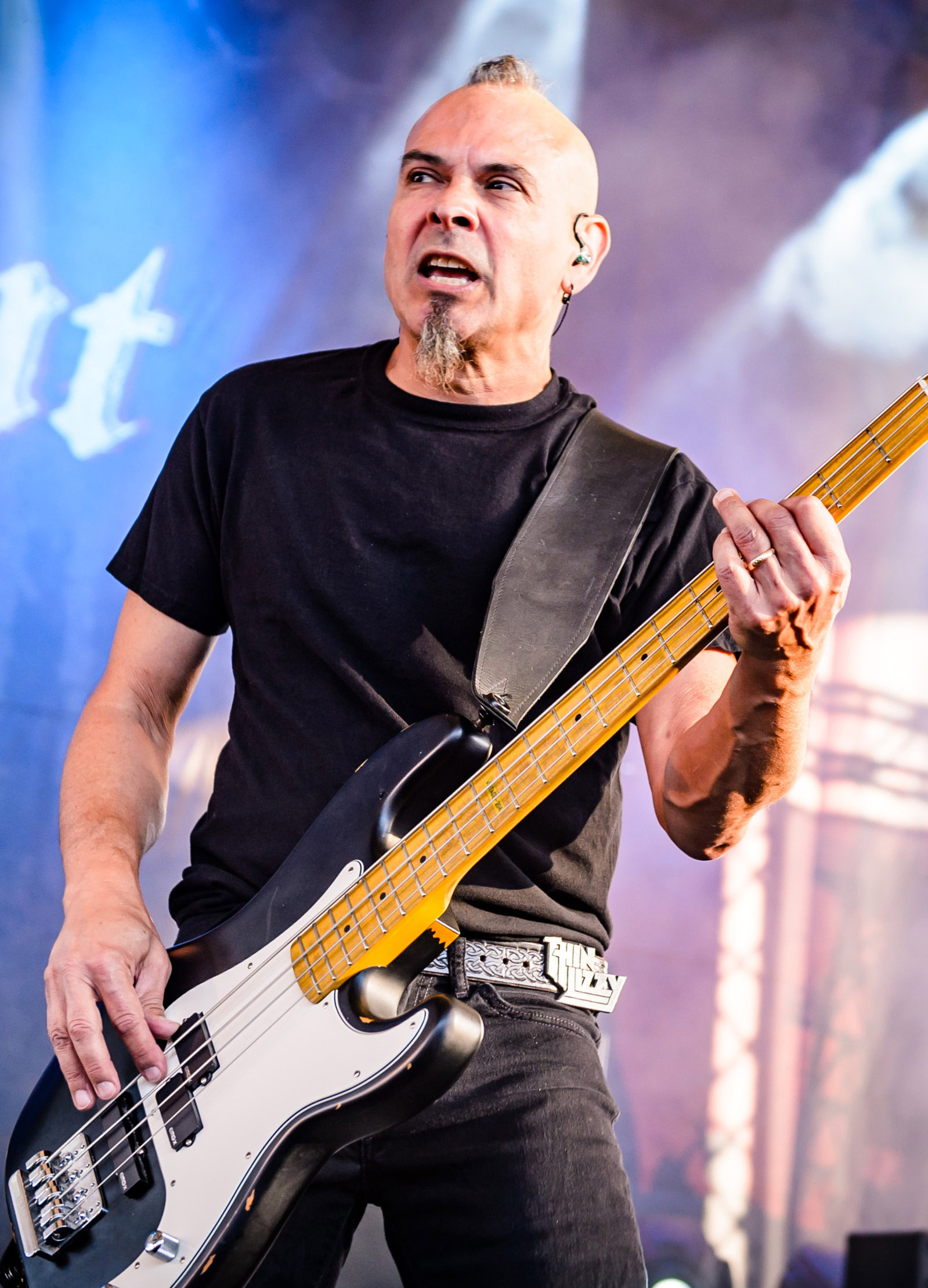
- Vera performing with Armored Saint in 2022

Background information
- Born: April 24, 1963 (age 63); Los Angeles, California, U.S.
- Genres: Heavy metal; progressive metal; power metal
- Occupation: Bassist
- Years active: 1982–present
- Member of: Armored Saint; Fates Warning
- Formerly of: Engine; Seven Witches; Motor Sister; Mercyful Fate

Joey Vera (born April 24, 1963) is an American bassist who is known as a member of the heavy metal band Armored Saint and progressive metal band Fates Warning. During 2004 and early 2005, he toured with Anthrax as a fill-in for Frank Bello, who had taken a break from the band. He was also a member of Engine, recorded with Tribe After Tribe, appeared on the OSI album Free, and contributed as a bassist on two albums with Lizzy Borden (Master of Disguise and Deal with the Devil). His first solo album, A Thousand Faces, was released in 1994. His current solo project, A Chinese Firedrill, released an album titled Circles in 2007. In August 2019, Vera was announced as the touring bassist for a newly reunited Mercyful Fate, filling in for Timi Hansen. He remained with the band until 2024.

Originally a guitar player, Vera took interest in playing the instrument after listening to Kiss' Alive!, and by the time Armored Saint formed, he had switched from guitar to bass. Vera has cited Geezer Butler, John Deacon, John Entwistle, Larry Graham, Steve Harris, Louis Johnson, John Paul Jones, Geddy Lee, Paul McCartney, Jaco Pastorius, and Verdine White as influences or inspirations to his bass playing. He usually plays bass by using his fingers, though he has used a guitar pick on a few occasions.

== Discography ==
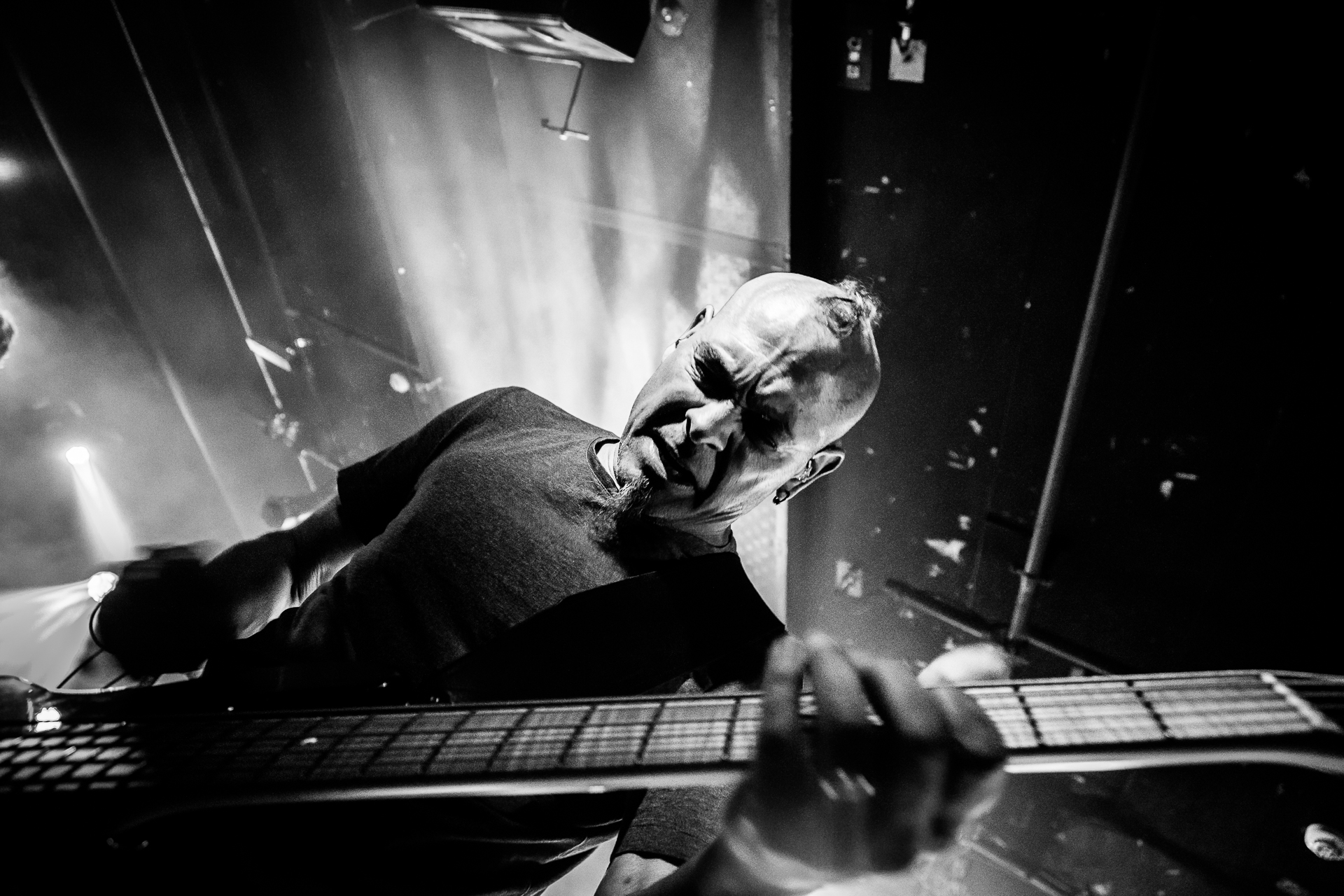
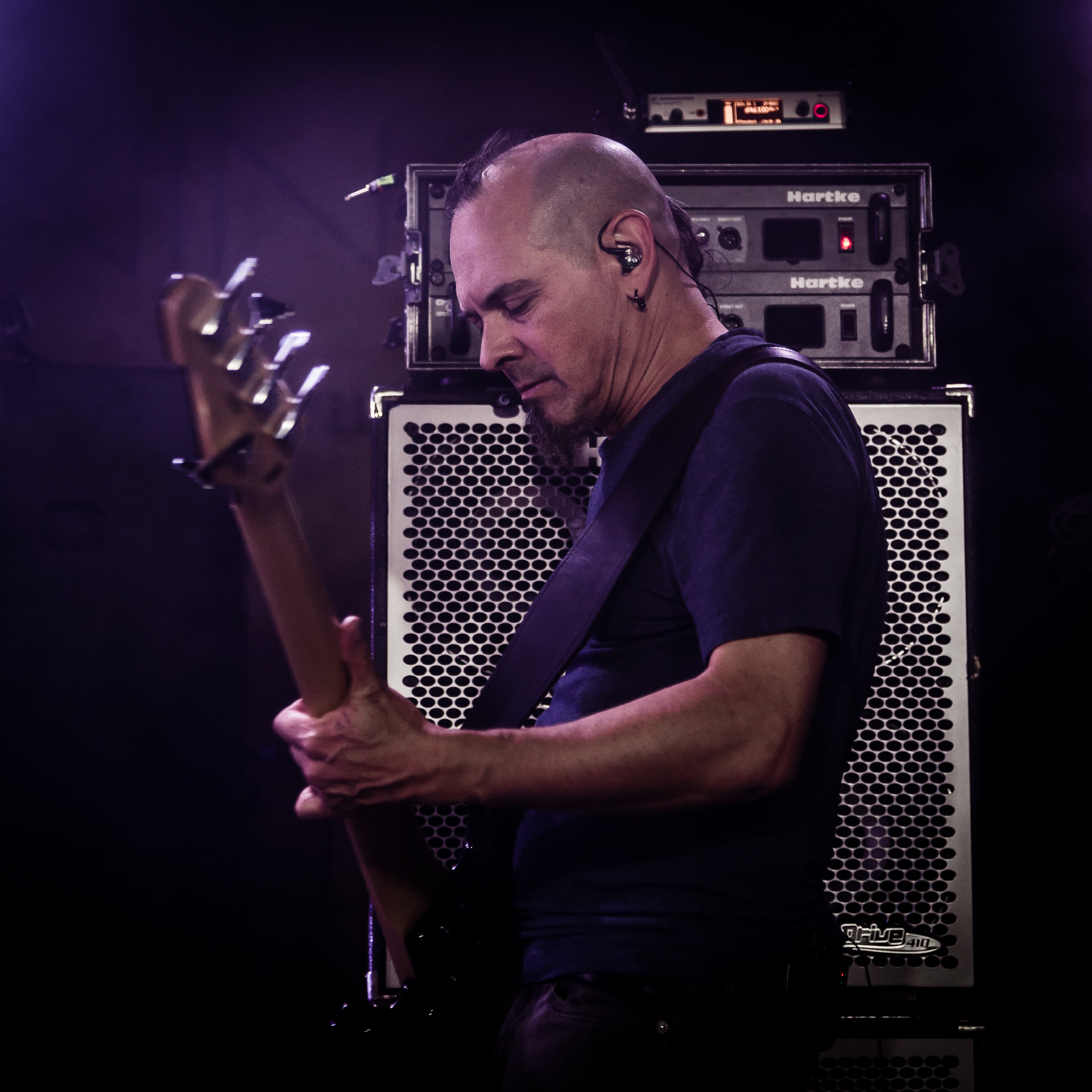
Vera performing with Fates Warning

=== Solo ===
==== as Joey Vera ====
- A Thousand Faces (1994)

==== as A Chinese Firedrill ====
- Circles (2007)

=== Other works ===
==== With Armored Saint ====
- Armored Saint EP (1983)
- March of the Saint (1984)
- Delirious Nomad (1985)
- Raising Fear (1987)
- Saints Will Conquer (1988)
- Symbol of Salvation (1991)
- Revelation (2000)
- Nod to the Old School (2001)
- La Raza (2010)
- Win Hands Down (2015)
- Carpe Noctum (2017)
- Punching The Sky (2020)

==== With Lizzy Borden ====
- Master of Disguise (1989)
- Deal with the Devil (2000)

==== With Fates Warning ====
- A Pleasant Shade of Gray (1997)
- Still Life (1999)
- Disconnected (2000)
- FWX (2004)
- Darkness in a Different Light (2013)
- Theories of Flight (2016)
- Long Day Good Night (2020)

==== With Tribe After Tribe ====
- Pearls Before Swine (1997)
- Enchanted Entrance (2002)

==== With Chroma Key ====
- Dead Air for Radios (1998)

==== With Engine ====
- Engine (1999)
- Superholic (2002)

==== With John Arch ====
- A Twist of Fate (2003)

==== With Seven Witches ====
- Passage to the Other Side (2003)
- Deadly Sins (2007)

==== With OSI ====
- Free (2006)

==== With Arch/Matheos ====
- Sympathetic Resonance (2011)

==== With Motor Sister ====
- Ride (2015)
