= The History of Flo & Eddie and the Turtles =

Box set by Flo & Eddie
- Released: 1983
- Genre: Rock
- Label: Rhino

Flo & Eddie chronology
Rock Steady With Flo & Eddie (1981)	The History of Flo & Eddie and the Turtles (1983)	The Best of Flo & Eddie (1987)

Professional ratings
Review scores
Source	Rating
Allmusic	3.0/5 stars

The History of Flo & Eddie and the Turtles is a three-LP box set album from Flo & Eddie, issued in 1983 by Rhino Records. The first LP includes a song recorded by an early incarnation of The Turtles under the name The Crossfires, a selection of rarities by The Turtles themselves, including a BBC session recording of their signature song "Happy Together", and songs from their first post-Turtles album, The Phlorescent Leech & Eddie, from 1972. The second LP contains songs from their next 3 albums: Flo & Eddie (1973), Illegal, Immoral and Fattening (1975), and Moving Targets (1976). The final LP in the set features songs recorded for film and TV soundtracks, linked with excerpts from The Flo & Eddie Radio Show. This box set has never been reissued on CD.

This was the first album in which Flo & Eddie had been legally allowed to use the name The Turtles since leaving White Whale Records, owners of the name, in 1970. Instead of duplicating tracks already available on the Turtles' first five studio albums, which had been reissued by Rhino the same year, the portion of the compilation dedicated to The Turtles contains otherwise out-of-print and unreleased material.

== Track listing ==
CHAPTER ONE

1. The Westchester High School A Capella Choir Class 1963 - "Alma Mater"
2. The Crossfires - "Silver Bullet"
3. The Turtles - "I Get Out of Breath"
4. The Turtles - "Outside Chance"
5. The Turtles - "Grim Reaper of Love"
6. The "Real" Don Steel - "Battle of the Bands Album Commercial"
7. The Turtles - "Lady-O"
8. The Turtles - "It Ain't Me Babe/You Baby/She'd Rather Be with Me/Elenore (Medley)"

CHAPTER TWO

1. The Turtles - "Happy Together" (live)
2. The Turtles - "Goodbye Surprise"
3. The Turtles - "There You Sit Lonely"
4. The Turtles - "We Ain't Gonna Party No More"
5. Flo & Eddie - "The Flo & Eddie Theme"
6. Flo & Eddie - "Feel Older Now"
7. Flo & Eddie - "Nikki Hoi"
8. Flo & Eddie - "I've Been Born Again"

CHAPTER THREE

- Flo & Eddie -

1. "Best Part of Breaking up"
2. "Another's Pop Star Life"
3. "Just Another Town"
4. "Afterglow"
5. "You're a Lady"
6. "Marmendy Mill"

CHAPTER FOUR

- Flo & Eddie -

1. "Illegal, Immoral and Fattening "
2. "Rebecca"
3. "Let Me Make Love to You"
4. "Mama, Open Up"
5. "Keep it Warm"
6. "Moving Targets"

CHAPTER FIVE

- The Flo & Eddie Radio Show - (All Songs previously unreleased)

1. "Flo & Eddie by the Fireside Radio Theme"
2. "The Big Showdown" (from the movie Texas Detour)
3. "This Could be the Day" (from the movie The Dirty Duck)
4. "(You're Nothing but a) Good Duck" (from the movie The Dirty Duck)

CHAPTER SIX

- The Flo & Eddie Radio Show - (All Songs previously unreleased)

1. "The Flo & Eddie Show"
2. "Getaway (Back to L.A.)" (from the movie Texas Detour)
3. "Livin' in a Jungle" (from the movie The Dirty Duck)
4. "Youth in Asia"
5. "Medley #2"

Special Guest appeared on the RADIO SHOW:

- David Bowie
- Keith Moon
- Ringo Starr
- Alice Cooper
- Marc Bolan
- Lou Reed
- Harry Nilsson
- Jeff Lynne
- Roy Wood
