= Working Man – A Tribute to Rush =

Working Man: A Tribute To Rush

Studio album by Various
- Released: August 2, 1996
- Recorded: 1995
- Genre: Progressive rock; hard rock
- Length: 72:45
- Label: Magna Carta Records
- Producer: Peter Morticelli, Mike Varney

Professional ratings
Review scores
| Source | Rating |
|---|---|
| Allmusic | 4.5/5 stars |

Working Man: A Tribute to Rush is a tribute album to progressive rock band Rush recorded by various artists and released on Magna Carta Records in 1996 (see 1996 in music). The album was mixed by original Rush producer Terry Brown at Town Music Studios in Toronto, Canada. Mike Portnoy was the main creative consultant.

== Personnel ==
Several prominent musicians from the genres of hard rock, progressive rock, heavy metal, progressive metal and extreme metal were a part of this project. Musicians include Sebastian Bach, Jake E. Lee, Mike Portnoy, Billy Sheehan, Brendt Allman, James LaBrie, Jack Russell, Michael Romeo, Michael Pinnella, Mike Baker, Gary Wehrkamp, Carl Cadden-James, Joe Nevollo, Steve Morse, Kevin Soffera, James Murphy, Eric Martin, Brad Kaiser, Robert Berry, Mark Slaughter, Deen Castronovo, Stuart Hamm, John Petrucci, Matt Guillory, Ray Alder, Joey Vera, Mark Zonder, Jim Matheos, Jason Keaser, Devin Townsend, Sean Malone, Sean Reinert, Gregoor Van Der Loo, Trent Gardner, Jeff Brockman, George Lynch.

== Track listing ==
All songs written by Geddy Lee/Alex Lifeson/Neil Peart, except where noted.

| No. | Title | Writer(s) | Personnel | Length |
|---|---|---|---|---|
| 1. | "Working Man" (with segue into "By-Tor and the Snow Dog") | Lee/Lifeson | Personnel: Sebastian Bach - lead vocals; Jake E. Lee - lead guitar; Mike Portnoy - drums; Billy Sheehan - bass; Brendt Allman - rhythm guitar | 3:52 |
| 2. | "By-Tor and the Snow Dog" (Parts IIIi–IIIii, IIIiv–IV): III. "Of the Battle"; i. "Challenge and Defiance" (1:08); ii. "7/4 War Furor" (1:12); iv. "Hymn of Triumph" (0:59); IV. "Epilogue" (1:01) | | Personnel: James LaBrie - lead vocals; Jake E. Lee - lead guitar; Mike Portnoy - drums; Billy Sheehan - bass; Brendt Allman - rhythm guitar | 4:12 |
| 3. | "The Analog Kid" | | Personnel: Jack Russell - lead vocals; Michael Romeo - lead guitar; Mike Pinnella - keyboards; Mike Portnoy - drums; Billy Sheehan - bass; Brendt Allman - rhythm guitar | 5:18 |
| 4. | "The Trees" | | Personnel: Mike Baker - lead vocals; Brendt Allman - lead and rhythm guitar; Mike Portnoy - drums; Billy Sheehan - bass; Chris Ingles - piano; Gary Wehrkamp - keyboards | 4:32 |
| 5. | "La Villa Strangiato": I. "Buenos Nochas, Mein Froinds!" (0:24); II. "To Sleep, Perchance to Dream..." (1:16); III. "Strangiato Theme" (1:12); IV. "A Lerxst in Wonderland" (2:30); V. "Monsters!" (0:20); VI. "The Ghost of the Aragon" (0:37); VII. "Danforth and Pape" (0:55); VIII. "The Waltz of the Shreves" (0:24); IX. "Never Turn Your Back on a Monster!" (0:11); X. "Monsters! (Reprise)" (0:17); XI. "Strangiato Theme (Reprise)" (1:06); XII. "A Farewell to Things" (0:14) | | Personnel: Steve Morse - classical guitar and main solo; Mike Portnoy - drums; Billy Sheehan - bass; Brendt Allman - rhythm guitar; David Townson - rhythm guitar; James Murphy - ending guitar solo and keyboards | 9:26 |
| 6. | "Mission" | | Personnel: Eric Martin - lead vocals; Brad Kaiser - drums; Robert Berry - lead guitar, bass, rhythm guitar, keyboards, background vocals | 5:34 |
| 7. | "Anthem" | | Personnel: Mark Slaughter - lead vocals; George Lynch - lead guitar; Deen Castronovo - drums; James Murphy - rhythm guitar; Stuart Hamm - bass | 4:14 |
| 8. | "Jacob's Ladder" | | Personnel: Sebastian Bach - lead vocals; John Petrucci - lead guitar; Matt Guillory - keyboards; Mike Portnoy - drums; Billy Sheehan - bass; Brendt Allman - rhythm guitar | 7:38 |
| 9. | "Closer to the Heart" (performed by Fates Warning) | Lee/Lifeson/Peart/Peter Talbot | Personnel: Ray Alder - lead vocals; Jim Matheos - lead guitar; Mark Zonder - drums; Joey Vera - bass | 3:00 |
| 10. | "Natural Science": I. "Tide Pools" (2:07); II. "Hyperspace" (2:48); III. "Permanent Waves" (3:44) | | Personnel: Devin Townsend - lead vocals; James Murphy - lead and rhythm guitar; Matt Guillory - keyboards; Deen Castronovo - drums; Stuart Hamm - bass; David Townson - second lead guitar | 8:39 |
| 11. | "YYZ" | Lee/Peart | Personnel: James Murphy - lead and rhythm guitar; Matt Guillory - keyboards; Deen Castronovo - drums; Stuart Hamm - bass | 4:20 |
| 12. | "Red Barchetta" | | Personnel: James LaBrie - lead vocals; Steve Morse - lead guitar; Richard Chycki - rhythm guitar; David Townson - rhythm guitar; Sean Malone - bass; Sean Reinert - drums; James Murphy - rhythm guitar, keyboards | 6:13 |
| 13. | "Freewill" | | Personnel: Gregoor van der Loo - lead vocals; Marcel Coenen - lead guitar; Trent Gardner - keyboards; Jeff Brockman - drums; Carl Cadden-James - bass | 5:29 |
