= Gary Wehrkamp =

American musician (born 1970)

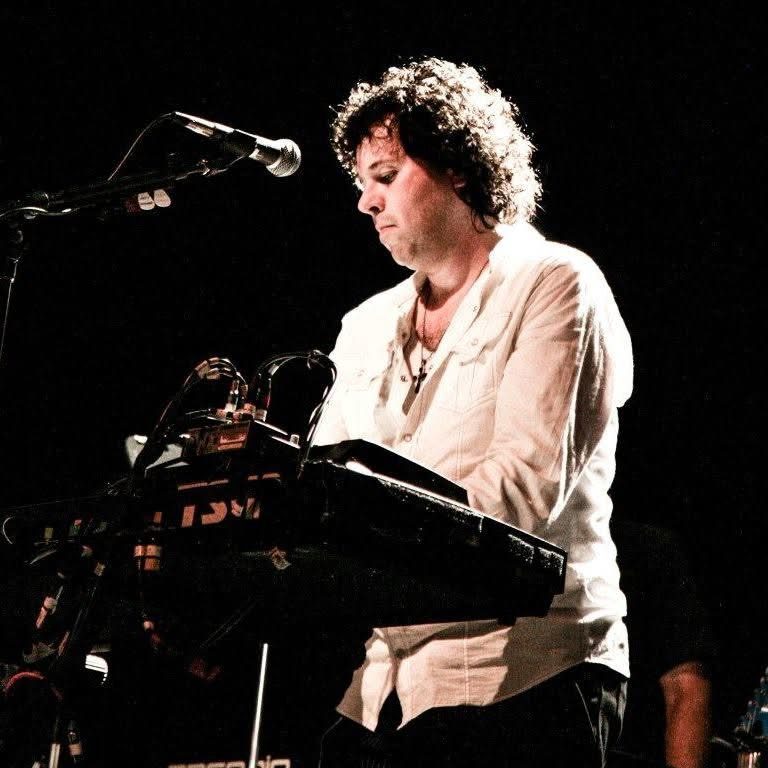
- Wehrkamp playing in a Shadow Gallery show

Background information
- Born: May 11, 1970 (age 56); Butler, New Jersey, U.S.
- Genres: Progressive metal, progressive rock, rock
- Instruments: Keyboards, guitar, bass, drums, vocals
- Formerly of: Shadow Gallery, Explorers Club, Warlord, Outside the Wall
- Website: shadowgallery.com

Gary Wehrkamp (born May 11, 1970) is an American musician, songwriter and producer. He is most notably a member of the progressive rock band Shadow Gallery.

== Early life ==
Wehrkamp was born on May 11, 1970, in Butler, New Jersey. He made his foray into music as a self-taught drummer and vocalist at the age of ten. He took up guitar and bass in his teens and performed in various bands for local dances and private parties. He began performing regularly as a drummer with the band Blak Sox in 1981, playing covers and originals at numerous camps in New Jersey.

On May 25, 1986, he performed with the band Nuthin Fancy in Hands Across America.

At age 18, Wehrkamp won a piano and found himself improvising for hours each day, crafting his talent of composing music. Since then he has only worked as a full-time musician. Wehrkamp performed in many New Jersey and Pennsylvania bands playing originals and covers. In 1992, Wehrkamp toured the U.S. playing shows to audiences of 40,000+ fans with the band, The Boxtops.

== Career ==
=== Shadow Gallery ===
Wehrkamp left The Boxtops in 1993 to join the progressive rock band Shadow Gallery. Since then Wehrkamp has been a composer, as well as performing guitars, keyboards and vocals in the band.

He also manages the day-to-day affairs for Shadow Gallery and their publishing company, ROOM V MUSIC.

Shadow Gallery has released seven albums worldwide through Magna Carta Records (until 2003) and Inside Out. The band has been noted as one of the most important and innovative progressive metal bands to come out in the last decade.

"Shadow Gallery is a band with an extremely loyal fanbase, an irrefutable integrity, and a unique sound that will doubtlessly guarantee its continued existence for years to come."

In 2022, Shadow Gallery started producing a podcast about the history of the band called "Shadow Gallery: The Untold Stories". It is hosted by Gary Wehrakmp and Jill Hughes (crew member for Shadow Gallery) with cameos from other band members Brendt Allman, Carl Cadden-James and Joe Nevolo. As of October 2024, 9 episodes have been published.

=== Other projects ===
Wehrkamp has been a musician, composer, producer, or engineer on over 250 albums throughout the past three decades. Some of these most notable projects are:

Wehrkamp wrote an original score for the film, A Walk in the Park, which premiered in New York City, on June 11, 2001. The same year, Wehrkamp was involved in a project called Sounds like Christmas, that featured artists such as John Wetton (King Crimson), Steve Walsh (Kansas), and Trent Gardner (Magellan).

Wehrkamp has been a guest keyboardist or guitarist on three Arjen Lucassen albums: Ayreon - Flight of the Migrator (2000), Ayreon - Ayreonauts Only (2000), Star One - Space Metal (2002). He also provided his engineer skills for the Ayreon Human Equation album (2004).

"Because I thought he was funny I decided to allow him to play a solo on 'Flight of the Migrator'. The joke was on me then... it was one of the best solos I had ever heard; a combination of playfulness (Steve Vai), virtuosity (Edward van Halen) and speed (Yngwie Malmsteen) and still with a completely recognizable own sound. It goes without saying that I worked with Gary again on the Star One album 'Space Metal', especially because he had to play a duel with the fastest keyboard player of the world Jens Johansson (the outcome is undecided). That solo is the reason I never dared play the song 'Master of Darkness' live..." – Arjen Lucassen

During his past and present tenures with Lucassen he received the nickname of "Garyeon".

In 2002, Wehrkamp was a guest guitarist on Explorers Club's second release Raising the Mammoth, which also included prog artists John Myung (Dream Theater), Marty Friedman (Megadeth), and Terry Bozzio.

In 2005, Wehrkamp was involved in Prog-Aid, a charity release by various artists from the Progressive Rock world to raise funds for the survivors of the Asian tsunami disaster.

In 2007, Wehrkamp joined a super group of musicians D.C. Cooper (Royal Hunt), Nick D'Virgilio (Spock's Beard), and Kurt Barabas (under the name Amaran's Plight) to create the album Voice in the Light. The concept of the album is a look at one man's search for answers following a near death experience. Along with providing the guitar and keyboard work on the album, Wehrkamp also acted as composer, producer and recording engineer for this album. The album made various Top 2007 album lists, including #3 on the online site USA Progressive Music and staff top 2007 picks on the Sea of Tranquility website.

In 2008, Wehrkamp was a guest musician on Srdjan Brankovic's Expedition Delta music project. That same year, along with progressive music publicist Jill Hughes, and Pocono-area businessman Brian Schmidt and musician Kristi Bronico, Wehrkamp formed the charity group The Wishmakers whose slogan is, "Musicians making a difference...harnessing the power of music and art to foster the spirit of giving." He produced the single "Christmastime in the Poconos" which successfully raised money for the Christmas Fund for local children in need.

In 2009, Wehrkamp was a guest guitarist on the album based on International bestselling author Kevin J. Anderson's book Terra Incognita: Beyond the Horizon, under the band name Roswell Six. It also featured other guest musicians such as John Payne (Asia), Erik Norlander (Asia Featuring, Rocket Scientists), and Lana Lane.

Along with the other Shadow Gallery band members, Wehrkamp has been involved in various tribute albums for Rush, Pink Floyd, Genesis, Yes, etc.

He also is one of the owners of Wasabi Brothers Management, which books artists and sets up publishing and licensing contracts for clients.

In March 2014, American metal band Warload announced that Wehrkamp would be taking the place of Philip Bynoe as Bassist for their 2014 European tour.

In 2014, co-founded the Pink Floyd tribute band Outside the Wall, acting as music director, performance guitarist, keyboardist and lead vocals at venues and festivals such as Sherman Theater, Kennett Square, and Musikfest.

Guest artist for many bands including Flaming Row, Divided Multitude, Rausch, DGM, and Enzo D and the Glory Ensemble.

In 2019, with drummer Mark Zonder (Warlord, formerly Fates Warning) formed the band Zonder Wehrkamp, with Wehrkamp on guitars, keyboards, bass and lead vocals and released a full-length album If it's Real. The band released 3 full production music videos for the album.

Wehrkamp was co-producer and composer for the full orchestra score for the Christmas musical Change, featuring Robin Smith. In early 2019, the full cast recorded a studio version of the musical's score at Wehkamp's New Horizon Music Studios.

In 2020, Wehrkamp joined other notable musicians such as David Ragsdale (Kansas), Tony Levin (King Crimson), Todd Sucherman (Styx), Pete Trewavas (Marillion), by performing a guitar solo on Telergy's album Black Swallow.

In December 2020, Wehrkamp resurrected The Wishmaker's song "Christmastime in the Poconos" by collaborating with Liberty and Freedom High School choirs in Bethlehem, Pennsylvania, to produce a new version called "Christmastime in Bethlehem Again." Partnering with Pauerhouse productions, a music video was produced virtually featuring students from both schools singing from their homes.

Wehrkamp currently performs live on bass, guitar, keyboards and vocals with Pocono-area cover bands JR Trio, fronted by Jim Roberti, and The Maybabies. These bands have played regularly over 100 shows per year over the past two decades, performing at venues such as Yankee Stadium, Highline Ballroom, Central Park Boathouse, World Trade Center, The Red Lion, The Players Club, The Ritz-Carlton, The Waldorf-Astoria (NYC), and Met Life Tailgate events (East Rutherford, NJ). "With more than 8,000 collective shows between them, the MAYBABIES have all the experience to deliver a professional and entertaining show where their evolving set-list includes music from all eras, suitable for the crowd in front of them."

Wehrkamp is a producer and performing musician for Hispanic/Latina pop artist Sophia Angelica. Wehrkamp performed with Sophia Angelica on Wonderama TV at Times Square on April 22, 2022. In 2022, Sophia Angelica was presented the Marvin Hamlisch International Music Award (Contemporary Pop, Emerging Division) by the legendary Clive Davis for the song "Flying On" that was produced by Wehrkamp.

== Influences ==
Wehrkamp notes that his personal music influences are Pink Floyd, Rush, Yes, Kansas, Van Halen, and Queen. He also draws inspiration from guitar virtuosos such as Yngwie Malmsteen, Eddie Van Halen, Steve Vai, and others.

== Personal life ==
Wehrkamp currently lives in Stroudsburg, Pennsylvania with his wife and son. He owns New Horizon Music Studios, where he works as a producer, studio musician, engineer and teacher (drums, bass, guitar, piano and recording concepts).

On November 29, 2015, the Wehrkamp family home, along with Gary's recording studio and equipment, was destroyed by a fire. The following day, Shadow Gallery shared a link to their official Facebook page urging fans of the band to donate money to nonprofit organization Mady's Angels in support for the family's recovery. On December 26, benefit concert was held at Sherman Theater, hosted by benefit group the Wishmakers.

In 2017, Wehrkamp's studio New Horizon Music Studios was rebuilt and opened its doors again to music students and recording artists.

== Discography ==
=== With Shadow Gallery ===
- Carved in Stone (1995)
- Tyranny (1998)
- Legacy (2001)
- Room V (2005)
- Prime Cuts (2007)
- Digital Ghosts (2009)

=== As a composer ===
- James LaBrie's MullMuzzler - Keep It to Yourself (1999)
- James LaBrie's MullMuzzler -MullMuzzler 2 (2001)
