= Carved in Stone (Shadow Gallery album) =

Studio album by Shadow Gallery
- Released: July 11, 1995
- Recorded: November 1994 - March 1995
- Genres: Progressive metal, progressive rock
- Length: 71:04
- Label: Magna Carta
- Producers: Carl Cadden-James, Gary Wehrkamp, and Shadow Gallery

Shadow Gallery chronology
| Shadow Gallery (1992) | Carved in Stone (1995) | Tyranny (1998) |

Professional ratings
Review scores
| Source | Rating |
|---|---|
| AllMusic | 4.5/5 stars |
| Metallized.it | 93/100 |
| Rock Hard | 9.5/10 |

Carved in Stone is the second album by American progressive metal group Shadow Gallery, released in 1995. An unreleased demo made for this album (the song "Rule the World") was released in the compilation album Prime Cuts. This album and their 1992 self-titled debut were re-released together as a two-disc limited edition set in 2015. The album has received positive feedback from reviewers, with some comparing it to the earlier works of bands like Crimson Glory, Dream Theater, and Fates Warning.

== Track listing ==
1. "Cliffhanger" – 8:41
2. "Interlude #1" - 0:40
3. "Crystalline Dream" – 5:44
4. "Interlude #2" - 0:43
5. "Don't Ever Cry, Just Remember" – 6:29
6. "Interlude #3" - 1:03
7. "Warcry" – 5:59
8. "Celtic Princess" – 2:05
9. "Deeper Than Life" – 4:32
10. "Interlude #4" - 0:16
11. "Alaska" – 5:18
12. "Interlude #5" - 0:18
13. "Ghostship" – 29:20
  1. "The Gathering The Night Before" – 2:42
  2. "Voyage" – 1:37 (Instrumental)
  3. "Dead Calm" – 2:32 (Instrumental)
  4. "Approaching Storm" – 2:24
  5. "Storm" – 5:38
  6. "Enchantment" – 3:57 (Instrumental)
  7. "Legend" – 2:54
  8. "TG94 (Thanks Giving 1994)" – 7:24

Note: The "Thanksgiving 1994" section is actually a hidden track, starting with silence from the 22-minute mark of "Ghostship" to 22:40, in which "someone starts compulsively tapping on a microphone with some regularity for about 120 seconds", then the music from the hidden track begins. The hidden track was written and recorded by Gary Wehrkamp on Thanksgiving day in 1994, hence the title.

== Personnel ==
- Carl Cadden-James - bass guitar, vocals, flute
- Brendt Allman - acoustic and electric guitars, vocals
- Chris Ingles - piano, keyboards, synthesizer
- Gary Wehrkamp - piano, guitar, synthesizer, vocals
- Kevin Soffera - drums, percussion
- Mike Baker - lead vocals
