= From Rats to Riches =

Studio album by Good Rats
- Released: 1978
- Genre: Rock
- Labels: Passport (original US & Canadian release); Radar (UK); Harvest (Germany & Australia); Mercury (Greece)
- Producer: Flo & Eddie

Good Rats chronology
Ratcity in Blue (1976)	From Rats to Riches (1978)	Rats, The Way You Like 'Em (1979)

From Rats to Riches is an album by the American rock band Good Rats, released in 1978. It was produced by Flo & Eddie. Joe Franco's drumming was influenced primarily by Tony Williams and Carmine Appice.

== Critical reception ==
Professional ratings
Review scores
Source	Rating
AllMusic	3/5 stars
The Encyclopedia of Popular Music	3/5 stars
The New Rolling Stone Record Guide	3/5 stars

The Poughkeepsie Journal deemed From Rats to Riches "East Coast urban rock," writing that "underlying all of these darkly decadent circumstances is a determination to get out from under the crowd." The Morning News labeled it "solid, blues-based hard rock from a Zappa-like group."

AllMusic called the album "strong but overlooked." Chuck Eddy, in Terminated for Reasons of Taste, wrote: "Heavier than I would have guessed, and more lyrically and structurally eccentric ... than I figured from supposed bar-band hacks, with sonic influences running the gamut from doo-wop to prog to maybe even punk." Noting a 1993 reissue, Newsday deemed Good Rats "the tri-state area's greatest bar band." The Encyclopedia of Popular Music considered it Good Rats' best album.

== Track listing ==
1. "Taking It to Detroit" – 3:36
2. "Just Found Me a Lady" – 2:50
3. "Mr. Mechanic" – 3:39
4. "Dear Sir" – 3:12
5. "Let Me" – 4:45
6. "Victory in Space" – 3:06
7. "Coo Coo Coo Blues" – 4:37
8. "Don't Hate the Ones Who Bring You Rock & Roll" – 3:18
9. "Could Be Tonight" – 2:54
10. "Local Zero" – 5:08

== Personnel ==
- Peppi Marchello – lead vocals
- Mickey Marchello – guitars, backing vocals
- John "The Cat" Gatto – guitars, keyboards
- Lenny Kotke – bass, backing vocals
- Joe Franco – drums
