= Room V =

Studio album by Shadow Gallery
- Released: June 7, 2005
- Genre: Progressive metal, hard rock
- Length: 75:34
- Label: InsideOut
- Producer: Carl Cadden-James, Gary Wehrkamp, and Shadow Gallery

Shadow Gallery chronology
Legacy (2001)	Room V (2005)	Digital Ghosts (2009)

Professional ratings
Review scores
Source	Rating
ProgArchives	95%
ProgArchives	4.13/5 stars
Sea of Tranquility	4.5/5 stars

Room V is the fifth studio album by the progressive metal group Shadow Gallery, released in 2005 (see 2005 in music). It continues the story started in Tyranny, picking up after Tyranny's Act II. It is the band's first album not featuring longtime keyboardist Chris Ingles, although he did have input in the album's writing process before his departure. It is also their last album to feature longtime lead vocalist Mike Baker, who died of a heart attack in 2008.

The cover art was done by Rainer Kalwitz, who also did the art for Tyranny.

Its title is derived from the graphic novel V for Vendetta, which also inspired the band's name.

== Track listing ==
All titles and song lengths taken from the Room V liner notes.

Act III
No.	Title	Writer(s)	Lyrics	Length
1.	"Manhunt" (Instrumental)	Brendt Allman; Chris Ingles; Gary Wehrkamp		2:09
2.	"Comfort Me"	Wehrkamp	Carl Cadden-James; Wehrkamp	6:51
3.	"The Andromeda Strain"	Allman; Cadden-James; Wehrkamp	Cadden-James	6:46
4.	"Vow"	Cadden-James; Wehrkamp	Mike Baker; Cadden-James	8:27
5.	"Birth of a Daughter" (Instrumental)	Allman; Wehrkamp		2:40
6.	"Death of a Mother" (Instrumental)	Allman; Wehrkamp		2:15
7.	"Lamentia"	Wehrkamp	Cadden-James	1:04
Total length:				30:16

Act IV
No.	Title	Writer(s)	Lyrics	Length
8.	"Seven Years" (Instrumental)	Allman; Ingles		3:37
9.	"Dark" (Instrumental)	Cadden-James		1:03
10.	"Torn"	Cadden-James; James LaBrie; Wehrkamp	Cadden-James	8:23
11.	"The Archer of Ben Salem"	Allman; Ingles; Wehrkamp	Cadden-James	7:28
12.	"Encrypted"	Allman; Ingles	Cadden-James	8:01
13.	"Room V"	Allman; Wehrkamp	Cadden-James	7:44
14.	"Rain"	Allman	Cadden-James	8:59
Total length:				45:17

Special Edition bonus disc
No.	Title	Writer(s)	Lyrics	Length
1.	"Joe's Spotlight"	Joe Nevolo		3:06
2.	"She Wants to Go Home"	Allman	Allman	2:40
3.	"Memories" (Demo)	Wehrkamp	Baker	1:59
4.	"Rain" (Acoustic Version)	Allman	Cadden-James	5:53
5.	" Floydian Memories: 1. Pigs on the Wing (Part I); 2. Fearless; 3. Mother (The Post War Dream/Thin Ice); 4. Bike; 5. Brain Damage; 6. (Tienneman's Square/Goodbye Blue Sky); 7. Point Me at the Sky; 8. Your Possible Pasts; 9. Shining On (guitar solo by Arjen Anthony Lucassen); 10. One in the Crowd; 11. Several Species of Small Furry Animals Gathered Together in a Cave and Grooving with a Pict (distant banter); 12. Baby Lemonade (with guitar riff from Another Brick in the Wall); 13. Welcome to the Machine (with interspersed vocalization from Wish You Were Here); 14. Summer of '68 (instrumental); 15. Sheep (sung by Arjen Anthony Lucassen); 16. Julia Dream; 17. Comfortably Numb (guitar solo by Gary Wehrkamp); 18. Cymbaline; 19. Corporal Clegg (with interspersed vocalization from The Great Gig in the Sky); 20. Mother Reprise; 21. Wot's... Uh the Deal? (with Wish You Were Here segue); 22. The Fletcher Memorial Home (Paranoid Eyes/The Final Cut); 23. On the Turning Away; 24. Pigs on the Wing (Part II); "	Pink Floyd	Pink Floyd	24:36
Total length:				38:16

- The bonus disc also includes a CD-ROM segment titled The Story of Room V.

== Personnel ==
All credits taken from the Room V liner notes.

Shadow Gallery

- Carl Cadden-James - Bass guitar, backing vocals, Archer on "The Archer of Ben Salem", flute
- Brendt Allman - Acoustic and electric guitars, Vocals
- Gary Wehrkamp - Guitars, keyboards, backing vocals
- Joe Nevolo - Drums and percussion
- Mike Baker - lead vocals

Additional musicians

- Laura Jaeger - vocals on "Comfort Me"
- Libby Molnar - part of Alaska on "Dark"
- Mark Zonder - drums on "One in the Crowd" and a portion of "Floydian Memories"
- Arjen Lucassen - vocals throughout "Floydian Memories"; guitar solo in "Seven Years" and in the extract "Shining On"
- Jim Roberti - vocals throughout "Floydian Memories"
- Joe Stone - first guitar solo on "The Archer of Ben Salem"
