= Ratcity in Blue =

Studio album by The Good Rats
- Released: 1976
- Genre: Rock, Progressive rock, Jazz rock, Hard rock, Glam rock, Heavy metal
- Label: Platinum Records
- Producer: Stephan Galfas

The Good Rats chronology
Tasty (1974)	Ratcity in Blue (1976)	From Rats to Riches (1978)

Ratcity in Blue is a 1976 album by the Good Rats and was released on the Platinum Records label.

== Track listing ==
Words and music by Peppi Marchello—arranged by the Good Rats

1. "Does It Make You Feel Good" 3:29
2. "Boardwalk Slasher" 3:53
3. "Ratcity In Blue" 4:53
4. "Reason To Kill" 5:05
5. "Writing The Pages" 3:03
6. "The Room" 4:07
7. "Almost Anything Goes" 2:41
8. ″Advertisement In The Voice" 3:19
9. "Yellow Flower" 2:39
10. "Tough Guys" 2:33
11. "Hour Glass" 3:21
12. "Mean Mother" 2:37

† Bonus track on Jem / Ratcity Records re-issue

== Personnel ==
- Peppi Marchello – lead vocals
- Mickey Marchello – guitar, vocals
- Lenny Kotke – bass, vocals
- John "The Cat" Gatto – guitar
- Joe "Brasciola" Franco – drums

== Sources ==
- Good Rats' Ratcity In Blue album cover - Album Art By: Mike Mancusi
