= List of A Day to Remember concert tours =

This is a list of concert tours by A Day to Remember, a rock band from Ocala, Florida.

== Tours ==
| Tour name | Participating bands | Location | Participating from – to |
|---|---|---|---|
| U.S. Summer 2005 Tour | A Day to Remember, Caldwell, Orion (Note: Orion joined the tour from the June 30 date and stayed until the end of the tour.) | U.S. | June 20 – July 19, 2005 |
| U.S. Fall/Winter 2005 Tour | A Day to Remember, Foreknown, Blessed by a Broken Heart | U.S. | October – November, 2005 |
| U.S. 2006 Tour | A Day to Remember, A Heartwell Ending, On the Last Day (December 3 – 18) | U.S. | November 25 – December 18, 2006 |
| Drop Dead, Gorgeous 2007 Tour | Drop Dead, Gorgeous, Set Your Goals, Alesana, A Day to Remember | U.S. | May 14–19, 2007 |
| Alesana 2007 Tour | Alesana, A Day to Remember, Dance Gavin Dance, Pierce the Veil | U.S. | May 20 – June 5, 2007 |
| Flip on a Tweak Realm and Set It (Off) Tour | The Sleeping, A Day to Remember, Valeyra, Envy on the Coast (July 5 – 17), A Thorn for Every Heart (July 18 – August 8), I Am the Avalanche (August 10 – 16) | U.S. | July 5 – August 16, 2007 |
| Bayside 2007 Tour | Bayside, June, A Day to Remember, Driver Side Impact, The Sleeping | U.S. | October 25 – December 8, 2007 |
| UK 2008 Tour | Maylene and the Sons of Disaster, A Day to Remember | UK | January 11 – 20, 2008 |
| Chillers: Bros in the Snow Tour | Silverstein, The Devil Wears Prada, A Day to Remember | U.S. | February 21 – March 29, 2008 |
| U.S. 2008 Tour | A Day to Remember, Crime in Stereo, Just Surrender | U.S. | March 31 – April 14, 2008 |
| Millencolin European Tour | Millencolin, A Day to Remember, Dead to Me | Europe | April 21, 22, 23, 26, and 27. |
| UK 2008 Tour | The Devil Wears Prada, A Day to Remember, Alesana | UK | June 5–12, 2008 |
| Warped Tour 2008 | A Day to Remember | U.S. | June 20 – July 20, 2008 |
| Easycore Tour | New Found Glory, A Day to Remember, Four Year Strong, International Superheroes of Hardcore, Crime in Stereo | U.S. | September 11 – October 12, 2008 |
| New Zealand 2008 Tour | The Acacia Strain, A Day to Remember, A Cause to Unite | New Zealand | December 4–6, 2008 |
| Sweatfest | Parkway Drive, Suicide Silence, The Acacia Strain, A Day to Remember | Australia | December 10–20, 2008 |
| UK and Germany 2009 Tour | A Day to Remember, For the Fallen Dreams, Azriel | UK, Germany | February 15 – March 7, 2009 |
| Sweet Brag Tour | The Devil Wears Prada, A Day to Remember, Sky Eats Airplane, Emarosa | U.S. | February 20, March 14 – May 1, 2009 |
| Warped Tour 2009 | Alexisonfire, Bayside, Escape the Fate, Gallows, The Maine, Saosin, Scary Kids Scaring Kids, Sing It Loud, Tat | U.S. | June 26 – August 23, 2009 |
| Cross-Canada Tour | Silverstein, A Day to Remember, Ten Second Epic, I Am Committing a Sin, Brendan Rivera | Canada | September 16 – 26, 2009 |
| The Pulling Your Pud Tour | A Day to Remember, Parkway Drive, In Fear and Faith, I See Stars | U.S. | September 27 – October 16, 2009 |
| Bring Me the Horizon UK Tour | Bring Me the Horizon, A Day to Remember, August Burns Red | UK | October 22–26, 2009 |
| Soundwave 2010 (Note: The band played sideshows on February 23 in Melbourne and on February 24 in Sydney, along with Set Your Goals, Four Year Strong and This Is Hell.) | STAGE 4 w/ Whitechapel, Trivium, Anthrax, Meshuggah, Anvil, Clutch, Isis, Baroness, This is Hell | Australia | February 20 – March 2, 2010 |
| UK Tour 2010 | A Day to Remember, Architects, Your Demise | UK | March 9–14, 2010 |
| Toursick | A Day to Remember, August Burns Red, Silverstein, Enter Shikari, Veara, Go Radio | U.S. | March 31 – May 16, 2010 |
| What Separates Me from You Tour | A Day to Remember, Underoath, The Word Alive, Close Your Eyes | U.S. | November 2 – 28, 2010 |
| No Sleep Til Festival 2010 | A Day to Remember, August Burns Red, We Came As Romans, NOFX, Descendents, Megadeth, Suicide Silence, Parkway Drive, Dropkick Murphys, Gwar, Alkaline Trio, Atreyu, Frenzal Rhomb, House Vs. Hurricane, Break Even, Confession and Heroes for Hire | Australia | December 15 – 19, 2010 |
| European Tour 2011 | A Day to Remember, Pierce the Veil, Bayside, Yashin(Glasgow Only) | UK | January 28 – February 22, 2011 |
| The Game Changers Tour (Note: One show, the March 15 performance at Irving Plaza in New York, was billed as "An Evening with A Day to Remember". It was a showcasing of songs from the band's catalog across an acoustic and electric set.) | A Day to Remember, Bring Me the Horizon, We Came As Romans, Pierce the Veil | U.S. | March 10 – April 18, 2011 |
| What Separates Me from You Australia Tour | A Day to Remember & Underoath | Australia | May 8–17, 2011 |
| Warped Tour 2011 | MAIN STAGE W/ 3OH!3, Against Me!, Asking Alexandria, Attack Attack!, August Burns Red, The Devil Wears Prada, D.R.U.G.S., Gym Class Heroes, Jack's Mannequin, Less Than Jake, Paramore, Pepper | U.S. | June 24 – August 14, 2011 |
| Eastpak Antidote Tour 2011 | A Day to Remember, The Ghost Inside, August Burns Red & Living with Lions | Europe | October 20 – November 18, 2011 |
| U.S.Rise Against Tour | Rise Against, A Day to Remember, The Menzingers (January 17 – February 5), Title Fight (April 15 – May 10) | U.S. | January 17 – February 5, April 15 – May 10, 2012 |
| Soundwave 2012 (Note: The band played sideshows on February 27 in Brisbane and on February 28 in Sydney, along with The Used and You Me at Six.) | A Day to Remember | U.S. | February 25 – March 5, 2012 |
| Right Back at It Again Tour | A Day to Remember, Of Mice & Men, Chunk! No, Captain Chunk! (March 20 – April 5), Issues (April 6 – May 4) | U.S. | March 20 – May 4, 2013 |
| Right Back at It Again Tour | A Day to Remember, The Devil Wears Prada, Dream On, Dreamer | Australia | July 12 – 18, 2013 |
| Right Back at It Again Tour | A Day to Remember, Pierce the Veil, The Ghost Inside | Canada | August 11 – 21, 2013 |
| House Party Tour (Note: It was originally announced that the support acts were Pierce the Veil and All Time Low, with The Wonder Years announced as being another support act in early August 2013. The band also played at Aftershock Festival '13 in Sacramento, California (September 15), 5th Annual Epicenter in Irvine, California (September 21), and 89X Chill on the Hill in Sterling Heights, Michigan (October 4) in between dates on the tour.) | A Day to Remember, All Time Low, Pierce The Veil, The Wonder Years | U.S. | September 11 – October 24, 2013 |
| UK/Europe Tour 2014 (Note: It was originally announced in mid-June 2013 that the band would do a short tour around the UK in early 2014: February 8 in Cardiff, February 10 in Glasgow, February 12 in London, February 14 in Birmingham, and February 15 in Manchester. Further dates were announced in mid-July for performances in several European countries throughout January and February 2014. On October 15, 2013 Every Time I Die was announced as a support act, as was The Story So Far on October 22 and Mallory Knox on December 9.) | A Day to Remember, Mallory Knox (UK shows only), Every Time I Die, The Story So Far | UK/Europe | January 24 – February 15, 2014 |
| Soundwave 2014 (Note: A Day to Remember was announced as part of the second line-up announcement. The band will play sideshows on February 25 in Sydney and on February 27 in Melbourne, along with The Ghost Inside and I Killed the Prom Queen.) | A Day to Remember | Australia | February 22 – March 3, 2014 |
| Parks and Devastation Tour | A Day to Remember, Bring Me the Horizon, Motionless in White, Chiodos | U.S. | September 4 – October 11, 2014 |
| All Signs Point to Britain 2014 | A Day to Remember, Lower Than Atlantis, Decade | UK | November 12 – 23, 2014 |
| Big Ass Tour | The Amity Affliction, A Day to Remember, The Ghost Inside, Motionless In White | Australia/New Zealand | December 12 – 19, 2015 |
| Just Some Shows | A Day to Remember, Parkway Drive, State Champs | U.S. | May 3–18, 2016 |
| Bad Vibes Tour | A Day To Remember, New Found Glory, Neck Deep, Moose Blood | UK | Jan 22–28,2017 |
| 15 Years in the Making | A Day To Remember, Papa Roach, Falling in Reverse, The Devil Wears Prada | US | Feb 20-Mar 20, 2018 |

== Sources ==
- Sharpe-Young, Garry (2005). New Wave of American Heavy Metal (1st ed.). New Plymouth, N.Z.: Zonda Books. ISBN 9780958268400.
