= Legacy (Shadow Gallery album) =

Studio album by Shadow Gallery
- Released: May 15, 2001
- Genre: Progressive metal
- Length: 71:53
- Label: Magna Carta
- Producers: Carl Cadden-James, Gary Wehrkamp, and Shadow Gallery

Shadow Gallery chronology
| Tyranny (1998) | Legacy (2001) | Room V (2005) |

Professional ratings
Review scores
| Source | Rating |
|---|---|
| AllMusic | 4.5/5 stars |
| Daily Vault | A |
| DarkScene.at | 9/10 |
| Metalfan.nl | 90/100 |
| Metallized.it | 84/100 |
| Rock Hard | 9.5/10 |

Legacy is the fourth album by progressive metal group Shadow Gallery, released in 2001.

== Track listing ==
| No. | Title | Length |
|---|---|---|
| 1. | "Cliffhanger 2": I. "Hang On"; II." The Crusher" | 13:06: 6:48; 6:18 |
| 2. | "Destination Unknown" | 7:01 |
| 3. | "Colors" | 7:01 |
| 4. | "Society of the Mind" | 5:23 |
| 5. | "Legacy" | 5:04 |
| 6. | "First Light": I. "Chapter 1"; II. "Chapter 2"; III. "Chapter 3"; IV. "In-Studio Noises"; V. "Finale" | 34:18: 9:20; 7:40; 6:30; 5:10; 5:38 |
| Total length: | | 71:53 |

== Personnel ==
- Carl Cadden-James - bass guitar, vocals, flute
- Brendt Allman - acoustic, electric guitars, vocals, keyboards
- Chris Ingles - keyboards, synthesizer
- Gary Wehrkamp - piano, guitars, synthesizer, vocals, bass, sound effects
- Joe Nevolo - drums, percussion
- Mike Baker - lead vocals
