= 100-year flood (disambiguation) =

A 100-year flood is a flood event that has a 1% probability of occurring in any given year.

100-year flood may also refer to:

== Floods ==
- 1997 Merced River flood, occurred from December 31, 1996, to January 5, 1997, throughout the Yosemite Valley
- The 100-year floods of the Clutha River, New Zealand, on 14–16 October 1878 and 13–15 October 1978

== Other uses ==
- Hundred Year Flood, an album by progressive metal band Magellan
