= Tyranny (Shadow Gallery album) =

Studio album by Shadow Gallery
- Released: September 22, 1998
- Genre: Progressive metal
- Length: 73:44
- Label: Magna Carta
- Producers: Carl Cadden-James, Gary Wehrkamp and Shadow Gallery

Shadow Gallery chronology
Carved in Stone (1995)	Tyranny (1998)	Legacy (2001)

Professional ratings
Review scores
Source	Rating
AllMusic	4/5 stars
Metalfan.nl	97/100
Metallized.it	83/100
Powermetal.de	10/10
Rock Hard	10/10

Tyranny is the third album by American progressive metal group Shadow Gallery, released in 1998. It is the first concept album made by the band, and the story that commences on this album is continued in the album Room V. The album tells the story of "a defense worker's search for meaning after becoming disenchanted with his job."

== Track listing ==
Act I:

1. Stiletto in the Sand – 1:57
2. War For Sale – 5:35
3. Out of Nowhere – 4:20
4. Mystery – 5:42
5. Hope For Us? – 6:00
6. Victims – 5:13
7. Broken – 1:54

Act II:

8. I Believe – 8:41
9. Roads of Thunder – 6:06

I. Empowered
II. Virus
III. Powerless

10. Spoken Words – 4:38
11. New World Order – 8:11
12. Chased – 4:36
13. Ghost of a Chance – 5:19
14. Christmas Day – 5:40

== Personnel ==
All information from the album booklet.

Shadow Gallery

- Carl Cadden-James – bass, vocals, flute, production, engineering, mixing
- Brendt Allman – guitars, backing vocals
- Chris Ingles – keyboards
- Gary Wehrkamp – guitars, keyboards, backing vocals, production, engineering, mixing
- Joe Nevolo – drums
- Mike Baker – lead vocals

Additional musicians

- Larry Burke – spoken word on "Roads of Thunder"
- Gary Sloyer – spoken word on "Roads of Thunder"
- James LaBrie – vocals on "I Believe"
- Laura Jaeger – vocals on "Spoken Words"
- D.C. Cooper (vocalist of Royal Hunt) – vocals on "New World Order"
- Paul Chou – violin on "Spoken Words", "New World Order"

Production

- Ken Lee – mastering
- Rainer Kalwitz – cover art
