= Tasty (Good Rats album) =

Studio album by Good Rats
- Released: 1974
- Recorded: House of Music, West Orange, New Jersey, 1974
- Genre: Rock
- Label: Warner Brothers Records; Ratcity Records; Mondo Records; Fireball Records
- Producer: Stephan Galfas

Good Rats chronology
The Good Rats (1969)	Tasty (1974)	Ratcity in Blue (1976)

Professional ratings
Review scores
Source	Rating
Christgau's Record Guide	C−

Tasty is a 1974 album by Good Rats and was released on the Warner Brothers Records label.

== Track listings ==
Words and music by Peppi Marchello – arranged by Good Rats

1. "Back To My Music" 2:34
2. "Injun Joe" 5:28
3. "Tasty" 3:22
4. "Papa Poppa" 5:08
5. "Klash-Ka-Bob" 3:34
6. "Fireball Express" 3:16
7. "Fred Upstairs & Ginger Snappers" 3:11
8. "300 Boys" 3:49
9. "Phil Fleish" 4:00
10. "Songwriter" 3:50

A 2018 Record Store Day vinyl album had a different track ordering and added a bonus track:

11. "Melting Pot Cookbook (Bonus Demo)" 3:35

== Personnel ==
- Peppi Marchello – lead vocals, harmonica, and bats
- Mickey Marchello – guitar, vocals
- John "The Cat" Gatto – guitar
- Lenny Kotke – bass, vocals
- Joe Franco – drums

== Production ==
- Stephan Galfas – Producer
- George Marino – mastering

== Sources ==
- Good Rats' Tasty album cover (Fireball Records CD release)
- Tasty (Good Rats album)
