= Symphony for a Misanthrope =

Studio album by Magellan
- Released: April 18th, 2005
- Genre: Progressive metal Progressive rock
- Length: 46:57
- Label: InsideOut Music

Magellan chronology
Impossible Figures (2003)	Symphony for a Misanthrope (2005)	Innocent God (2007)

Professional ratings
Review scores
Source	Rating
Allmusic	3/5 stars

Symphony for a Misanthrope is the sixth studio album by the progressive metal/rock band Magellan. The track "Pianissimo Intermission" is based upon Johann Sebastian Bach`s "Goldberg Variation#1" (1742).

The album received a score of 4 out of 6 from Norway's Scream. The reviewer called the two preceding releases disappointing and "bickering", and Symphony for a Misanthrope was more of the same. "A mighty intro and a couple of groovy songs with great melodies makes for a more than good start, but then the bickering unfortunately comes creeping again". Ultimately, the music did not defend the record's longevity.

== Track listing ==
1. "Symphonette" (instrumental) - 2:51
2. "Why Water Weeds?" - 8:31
3. "Wisdom" - 4:24
4. "Cranium Reef Suite" - 18:05
  1. Pt.1: "Youthful Enthusiasm" (instrumental)
  2. Pt.2: "Psych 101"
  3. Pt.3: "Primal Defense"
5. "Pianissimo Intermission" (instrumental) - 2:08
6. "Doctor Concoctor" - 4:13
7. "Every Bullet Needs Blood" - 6:42
8. "Deconstruction Zone" (instrumental bonus track)

== Credits ==
- Trent Gardner — lead vocals, keyboards
- Wayne Gardner — guitars, bass, backing vocals

== Invited participants ==
- Steve Walsh — keyboards on 1
- Dave Manion — keyboards on 1
- Joe Franco — drums on 4, 5
- Stephen Imbler — piano on 5
- Robert Berry — drums, guitar, bass guitar on 2
