= Vivien Lalu =

French composer and record producer (born 1978)

Vivien Lalu (born 2 December 1978 in Paris, France) is a French composer, record producer, sound designer and keyboardist who plays in the melodic / progressive metal band A-Z as well as his own progressive rock project, Lalu. His distinctive signature as a Keyboardist is his inventive use of keyboard layers, which frequently combine New-age music elements with retro, progressive rock textures. Rock Hard praised Lalu for his "endlessly imaginative keyboard arrangements".

When it comes to Musical composition, The Prog Space highlighted Lalu's decision to move away from his early melodic prog metal sounds toward a "modernised" progressive rock style. Citing Yes as a major inspiration, almost religious to him, Lalu declared while promoting his latest effort, Paint the Sky: "There is only one Yes, and no one will ever be able to replace them! But I aim to bring their kind of music to a new generation".

== Early life ==
Vivien Lalu was born on 2 December 1978 in Paris, France, to Michel Lalu, the guitarist and vocalist of French progressive rock band Polène, and Noëlle Lalu, its keyboardist.

According to Lalu, his love for progressive rock may have been prenatal; it may have originated when his pregnant mother was playing Minimoog while he was in utero. He explained that his mother's Minimoog keyboard was right under his nose as a child, and that he always preferred the smooth feel of keys to the roughness of guitars.

He also grew up listening to his parents' tape recordings, as well as progressive rock bands like Yes, Genesis, Emerson, Lake & Palmer, and others, which fuelled his enthusiasm for this sort of music. He was similarly influenced by electronic music and video game music from the 1980s, having spent his first ten years of life in this decade.

Lalu used to visit his uncle one time per month, where his cousin's synthesizer was waiting for him. He would spend all day in her room making music, coming up with melodies of his own, committing them to memory before returning the following month to refine them. He claimed that one of the first songs he ever wrote as a youngster was some sort of Irish waltz.

Lalu didn't choose to become a musician at first, though. He aspired to work as a mechanic in the French Air and Space Force since he had always admired aircraft, however his eyesight and inner ear difficulties made him unsuitable for a pilot's career. He decided to pursue painting and enrolled in a school of graphic arts instead, where he initially joined his first music group, with which he played keyboards. His love for painting was subsequently neglected and totally supplanted by his love for music.

Even though Lalu had started listening to Iron Maiden while he was in school, and then around the end of college, Megadeth and Sepultura, the real "shock" happened the day he received a gift from one of his high-school friends: Dream Theater's Images and Words album. He was astonished because he had never conceived that metal music with huge guitars and double bass drums, could be combined with the progressive rock sound that he loved.

== Career ==
Oniric Metal (2005)

In 2004, Lalu began recruiting musicians from various bands and establishing his own progressive metal project under the name "Lalu". His first full-length album Oniric Metal featured guitarist Joop Wolters on guitars, Ryan Van Poederooyen of The Devin Townsend Band on drums, Russel Bergquist of Annihilator on bass, and Martin LeMar of Mekong Delta on vocals. The album was released on Lion Music in 2005 and received the title of "Album of the Month" in the French edition of Rock Hard in May 2005.

Metal Storm called Lalu "a promising artist who will become a leader of the Progressive French scene without any doubt". ProGGnosis made a similar observation, labelling Lalu a "fresh newcomer to a scene desperate for something different".

Atomic Ark (2013)

After a lengthy absence from rock and metal music production, Lalu began working on the second Lalu opus in 2012. He handled the composition and songwriting, as well as keyboards for the entire album. The main band on Atomic Ark consisted of returning vocalist Martin LeMar, bassist Michael Lepond of Symphony X, guitarist Simone Mularoni of DGM, and drummer Virgil Donati of Planet X. It also featured a number of guest musicians, including Jens Johansson of Stratovarius and Jordan Rudess of Dream Theater among others.

Sensory Records reportedly signed the album immediately upon hearing it, and released it worldwide on 10 September 2013.

The media's response has been highly positive. According to Metal Injection, Atomic Ark is a "Shining example of how to do progressive music correctly". PopMatters described it as "meticulous progressive craftsmanship, all finished with a virtuoso panache". Rock Hard praised its technical aspects, calling it a "celebration of excellent musicianship".

Artist Endorsement with Roland Corporation

In March 2014, Lalu officially became a firm endorser of Roland, declaring having used their keyboards for nearly twenty years.

Atomic Tour & Live at P60 (2015)

Lalu embarked on a small spring 2014 European tour with a limited number of shows featuring Atomic Ark's line-up and adding Joop Wolters as a second guitarist. The tour ended with the live recording during the final evening at P60, which was released as a digital-only album. Produced by Lalu himself, mixed and mastered by Simone Mularoni at Domination Studio, Live at P60 was officially released on 29 June 2015 through Bandcamp exclusively.

Celestial Spheres (2018)

In 2017, Roland asked Lalu to create a collection of ambient / cinematic sounds for the JD-XA. The company released it on their Axial platform in June 2018.

Multiple-album deal with Frontiers Records

Lalu started composing the third Lalu album, Paint the Sky, in 2019. Most of its music was written in 2020 while Lalu was confined as a result of French Covid-19 restrictions. Frontiers Records, impressed with the result upon hearing the album thanks to Alessandro Del Vecchio, promptly made contact with the French composer. They announced the signing of Lalu for a multiple-album deal in the following spring of 2021.

Paint the Sky (2022)

It has been said that "being the son of two musicians from the 70’s, and growing up surrounded by progressive music, Lalu always wanted to craft a true-to-its-roots progressive rock album".

To this end, Lalu's main lineup changed to: Damian Wilson of Headspace, Jelly Cardarelli of Adagio on drums, and Joop Wolters on guitars as well as bass this time.

Lalu took care of the music composition, while Damian Wilson handled all of the lyrics and vocal lines. Jelly Cardarelli co-produced the album with Lalu, and handled the mix entirely on his own. Alessandro Del Vecchio took care of the mastering.

Paint the Sky included contributions from several extra guest musicians, including Jordan Rudess and Jens Johansson, both of whom had previously performed on Atomic Ark. It also included appearances by Tony Franklin, Steve Walsh formerly of Kansas, and Simon Phillips formerly of Toto in the bonus-track version of the title track. The album was finally released by Frontiers Records on 21 January 2022, and in Japan through Marquee/Avalon.

Prog (magazine) labelled Lalu's third opus as "by far and away his best work yet", and a "corker" in their issue #128. Metal Injection's site editor himself called Paint the Sky a "progressive metal masterpiece". Yukinori Otani of Young Guitar Magazine gave Paint the Sky a bold metaphor "What if Jesus did progressive metal?".

A-Z (2022)

On the lookout for a keyboard player and composer for his new band, A-Z, Mark Zonder contacted Vivien Lalu via a common friend in the beginning of 2020. Lalu began working with Zonder to write songs based on the drum grooves supplied to him. Lalu got Joop Wolters, his long time guitar player, to join in as a guitarist and songwriter as well. In the band's introduction video, Steve Vai's bass player Philip Bynoe humorously dubbed Lalu and Wolters the "Songwriter guys". The line-up was then rounded out by Ray Alder of Fates Warning, as well as Bynoe. Later in 2021, Metal Blade Records announced their signing of the band. According to Mark Zonder's social media posts, the group is getting closer to a debut.

== Personal life ==
According to the city's official publication, issue 474 of March 2019, Lalu married Greek composer Eleftheria Zavalis in Maisons-Alfort. On "Paint the Sky," they composed the song "Emotionalised" together.

Lalu has two children from a prior relationship: Emma and Nina, who he frequently names in album liner notes.

Lalu also has two Miniature Pinscher dogs, named Perla and Luna according to their Instagram profile. They are mentioned under the pseudonym "Laluloggies" in Paint the Sky's booklet. Their active social media presence and photographs are frequently featured in Lifo (magazine).

== Filmography (TV, theater) ==
- Norvège : le crépuscule des rennes (TV / France 5) 2010
- A Deux Pas Du Futur" (TV / France 2) 2010
- Égypte : les métamorphoses du delta (TV / France 5) 2009
- Science 2 (TV / France 2) 2009
- Science X (TV / France 2) 2008
- Celine Engelstad (TV / Jewelry commercial) 2008
- Eden Roc (TV / France 3) 2008
- Seuls Two (Theater / Warner Bros.) 2007
- Les Dossiers Bogdanoff (TV / SCI FI Channel) 2007

== Discography ==
=== Lalu ===
- Oniric Metal (2005, Lion Music)
- Atomic Ark (2013, Sensory Records)
- Paint the Sky (2022, Frontiers Records)
- The Fish Who Wanted To Be King (2023, Frontiers Records)

=== Guest appearances ===
- Joop Wolters – Snapshot (2021, Self)
- Il Rovescio Della Medaglia – Tribal Domestic (2016, Sony Music)
- 21 Octayne – 2.0 (2015, AFM Records)
- Joop Wolters – False Poetry (2011, Self)
- Laszlo Jones – Banana Nation (2011, Universal Music France)
- Shadow Gallery – Digital Ghosts (2009, Inside Out Music)
- Shadrane – Temporal (2008, Lion Music)
- Mind's Eye – Walking On H2O (2006, Lion Music)
- Hubi Meisel – Kailash (2006, Lion Music)
- Hubi Meisel – EmOcean (2004, Lion Music)
- Joop Wolters – Speed, Traffic And Guitar Accidents (2004, Lion Music)
