= Shadow Gallery =

American progressive metal band

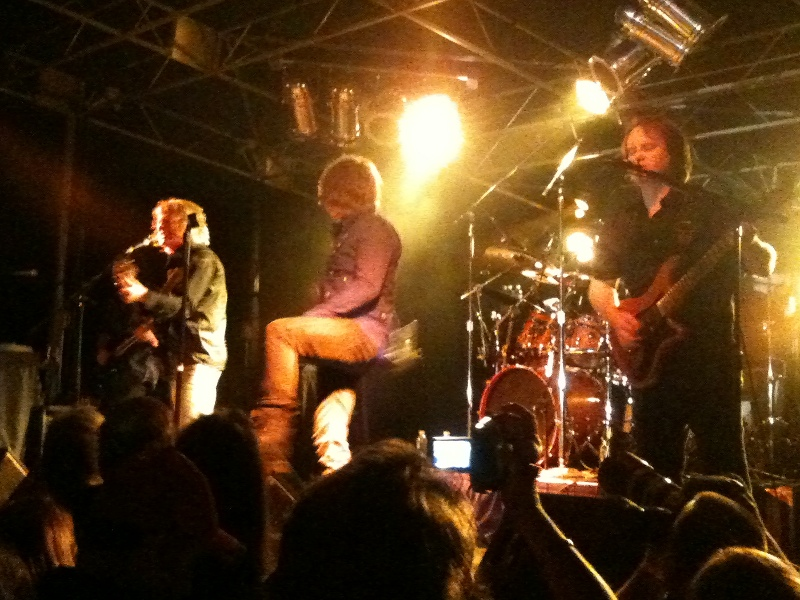
- Shadow Gallery performing in Tannersville, Pennsylvania, in September 2010. Left to right: Carl Cadden-James, Brian Ashland, and Brendt Allman. Not visible: Gary Wehrkamp, Eric Deigert, and Joe Nevolo.

Background information
- Also known as: Sorcerer (1985–1991)
- Origin: Lehigh Valley, Pennsylvania, U.S.
- Genres: Progressive metal, progressive rock
- Years active: 1985–present (on hold since 2016)
- Label: Inside Out
- Members: Carl Cadden-James; Brendt Allman; Gary Wehrkamp; Joe Nevolo; Brian Ashland
- Past members: Mike Baker; Kevin Soffera; Chris Ingles

Shadow Gallery is an American progressive metal band formed in the Lehigh Valley, Pennsylvania during the early 1980s. It was originally called Sorcerer. After changing their name to Shadow Gallery, taken from the graphic novel V for Vendetta by Alan Moore, and recording a short 8-track demo, the band was signed to Magna Carta Records in 1991. Shadow Gallery's eponymous debut was released the following year in Japan and Europe. In mid-2005, Shadow Gallery released their fifth studio album, Room V, on the European-American independent label Inside Out Music.

The band has been compared to contemporary progressive metal bands Dream Theater and Symphony X. The members of Shadow Gallery have also collaborated with other progressive metal bands. Dream Theater's James LaBrie contributed backing vocals to the song "I Believe", which appeared on Shadow Gallery's 1998 album, Tyranny, and in return Shadow Gallery members have contributed to LaBrie's side projects, including MullMuzzler.

Shadow Gallery songs, often in the context of a concept album or story, are frequently long with extended instrumental pieces in the middle. For diversity, their music is heavy at times and mellow at others, sometimes incorporating elements of neoclassical and symphonic metal.

On October 29, 2008, lead singer Mike Baker died of a heart attack at the age of 45.

== History ==
=== 1985–1991: As Sorcerer ===
Sorcerer originally consisted of Mike Baker, Carl Cadden-James, Ron Evans, and John Cooney. The ensemble began as a cover band, particularly interested in covering difficult to play songs by artists such as Yngwie Malmsteen and Rush. In 1985, guitarists Chris Ingles and Brendt Allman joined the band, with Ingles immediately switching to keyboard duties. At this time, Ron Evans departed in order to pursue other musical interests and goals.

=== 1991–1998: Debut and Carved in Stone ===
After changing their name to Shadow Gallery and recording a short 8 track demo, Mike Varney eventually signed them to Magna Carta records on August 23, 1991, as the label's second contract (the first having been Magellan). The record label's objective had been "..to bring a fresh breath of progressive rock to an audience who was subdued by larger record companies quest for typical commercial music". Impressed with Shadow Gallery's initial demo, Varney suspected the band could help fulfill this objective.

Shadow Gallery's eponymous debut was released the following year in Japan and Europe. However, before the arduous commitments of a supporting tour and a new studio album, the band needed to secure a stable lineup. April 1993 saw the recruitment of guitarist/keyboardist Gary Wehrkamp, originally of the band The Boxtops. Another lineup addition followed in April 1994 with drummer Kevin Soffera. With this new solidified lineup, Shadow Gallery released its second studio recording on July 11, 1995, titled Carved in Stone. However, time constraints and other commitments precluded the band from touring in support of both albums.

=== 1998–2001: Tyranny ===
Carved in Stone was followed up by their 1998 release, Tyranny with drummer Joe Nevolo replacing Kevin Soffera. The album is a deeply political concept album, with themes including the nature of war and the military-industrial complex. Tyranny is also notable for the contributions made by a number of guest musicians. Beyond James LaBrie's vocal contribution to "I Believe," D. C. Cooper (vocalist of Royal Hunt) contributed vocals to the track "New World Order," and violinist Paul Chou made a guest appearance on the tracks "Spoken Words" and "New World Order," with the former featuring a duet between Mike Baker and Laura Jaeger. Shadow Gallery would return the favor to LaBrie in 1998 when Allman, Cadden-James, Wehrkamp and local musician/songwriter Gary Sloyer appeared on and aided in LaBrie's musical side project, Mullmuzzler. Their debut record, Keep It to Yourself, was released by Magna Carta in the Summer of 1999."

=== 2001–2005: Legacy ===
On April 10, 2001, the band released their fourth studio album, Legacy, which would prove to be their last under Magna Carta Records. While this album was released in between Tyranny and Room V, it had no relation to the ongoing narrative of the two albums, instead forming a collection of independent songs. The album was met with generally favorable reviews, for example Screaming in Digital wrote that:

"Legacy is more progressive, artistic and technical than the band's previous work, although there are a couple nods to the possibility of mainstream radio airplay. It exhibits the well-balanced sound and highly polished production they're known for, with flawless instrumental work and vocals that, while not as emphasized as those of Geoff Tate or James LaBrie, are clear, emotional and perfectly suited to the music. It's not a sequel to Tyranny any more than Empire was a sequel to Operation: Mindcrime, but it's definitely some of the better music out there."

— excerpted from a review by Dan Birchall of Screaming in Digital

=== 2005–2008: Room V ===
On May 30, 2005 (Europe) and June 7, 2005 (USA) Shadow Gallery released Room V, the band's fifth studio album and its first under new record label InsideOut and also the first album without Chris Ingles. It is a concept album, which continued the narrative set out in Tyranny. The album included Jaeger returning to perform a vocal duet on "Comfort Me."

Included as a limited edition, the band also released a second disc. In addition to a multimedia segment titled The Story of Room V (that can be accessed on a computer's CD-ROM) the album contained five extra tracks, including a Joe Nevolo drum solo ("Joe's Spotlight"), an unreleased demo (entitled "Memories"), an acoustic version of Room V's "Rain", and a long medley covering many Pink Floyd songs titled Floydian Memories. This track is particularly notable, as it features Mark Zonder performing drums on the "One in a Crowd" portion of the medley, as well as Arjen Lucassen performing guest vocals and the "Shine On" guitar solo.

=== 2008–2009: Baker's death and Digital Ghosts ===
According to an email sent to the Shadow Gallery News email list on October 31, 2008, Baker died after suffering a heart attack on October 29, 2008, at the age of 45. Despite the death of Baker, Shadow Gallery continued, and their latest album, Digital Ghosts, was released on October 23, 2009, in Europe with new vocalist Brian Ashland. Wehrkamp stated on Shadow Gallery's MySpace page:

Shadow Gallery will continue. We will finish this record and make it as potent as it can be. There are some questions to be answered, but we feel confident we will be provided with the answers. The band has read so many of the wonderful heart touching comments, and heard from so many people these past two weeks and we look forward to giving the Shadow Gallery fans our very best, to honor them, and Mike.

=== 2014–present: Hiatus ===
On September 3, 2014, Shadow Gallery responded to a question on their Facebook page regarding a new album with: "There is movement, creation, there is collaboration, preparation – words spin into music freely given, voices for the stories told, passion to share with strokes so tender, so bold – a new dream born of old. Days pass but we do not count, we are forever past the age of doubt. We will rise. We will rise. You whisper time and who will follow you?... We are working on it."

On November 29, 2015, Wehrkamp's home and studio was destroyed by fire. Shadow Gallery subsequently posted links to their Facebook page asking fans to donate money to nonprofit organization Mady's Angels to aid Wehrkamp and his family. In addition, a benefit concert for the Wehrkamps was held at Sherman Theater on December 26. Although Wehrkamp and his family have made a recovery since, it is unclear how this will affect the band's progress on the new album. In June 2016, the band's Facebook page featured new material in the making via short Periscope videos. There is no new activity from the band since then.

== Musical style ==
=== Influences ===
Shadow Gallery combines musical influences from virtuoso guitarists, like as Jason Becker and Al Di Meola, as well as progressive rock bands such as Rush, Yes, Genesis and Pink Floyd. The band displays heavy metal influences from outfits Black Sabbath, Iron Maiden, Queensrÿche and Judas Priest. When interviewed on the subject, Gary Wehrkamp has also added that "The band likes everything from Tori Amos, to old Metallica, Alice Cooper, Gamma Ray, Type O Negative, and Nine Inch Nails."

== Live performances ==
To the chagrin of long-time fans, the band waited until 2010 to perform live, despite having been together (as Shadow Gallery) since the early 1990s. When asked the question in one interview, Wehrkamp explained that "We have always been more a studio band than a performing band unfortunately, and while we rehearsed for a tour just before Tyranny was started, a few obstacles blocked our touring options, and we were locked back in the studio to make another record. I know there are many people who cannot understand why we haven't played in support of this record, and I can see why they feel that way, but honestly, it's very difficult."

In a more recent 2005 interview, he cited the band's various side projects as a reason, stating that "I truly think that it will maybe never happen as we all have full diaries, families, full time jobs and mortgages... I for instance give lessons and I play in 2 other bands... But we will seriously consider it this time, as it will be very difficult to get all the guys of the band together to go on tour. Besides it was never our intention in the first place to do live gigs as SG is most and for all a real studio band. Maybe, some day, never say never…."

On December 17, 2009, it was announced on the band's website they were going to make their first live appearance on the Triton Power Cruise (along with nine other bands), which was set to sail April 30 to May 3, 2010, from Miami, Florida. However, in February the cruise was cancelled due to an extreme medical crisis within the promoter's family.

On April 17, 2010, Shadow Gallery announced on their website they will be the headliner on Saturday, October 2, 2010, at ProgPower Europe in Baarlo, Netherlands. On July 20 a local show in Tannersville, Pennsylvania, on September 5, 2010, at Barley Creek Brewing Company was announced. This will become the band's debut show and the opening band will be New Jersey–based progressive metal act Suspyre.

On the same day a statement appeared on the band's website saying they would embark on a two-week European tour starting with the ProgPower Europe show on October 2. The tour is called the "Shadow Gallery Live: 2010 Tour" and is sponsored by Greek concert promoter Warcry Entertainment Group. Support act during most of the shows will be the Greek modern rock band Maplerun. Although all band members have performed live onstage before in other bands this will be the first tour in 20 years of their career as Shadow Gallery.

In the weeks following the initial announcement more tour dates were confirmed and as of August 23, 2010, the final European tour schedule is listed as:

- October 2, 2010 – ProgPower Europe Festival – Baarlo, Netherlands
- October 3, 2010 – House of Progression – London, England
- October 4, 2010 – Nouveau Casino – Paris, France
- October 6, 2010 – Alcatraz – Milan, Italy
- October 8, 2010 – 8Ball – Thessaloniki, Greece
- October 9, 2010 – Stage Club – Larissa, Greece
- October 10, 2010 – Kyttaro – Athens, Greece
- October 14, 2010 – MMC Club – Bratislava, Slovakia
- October 16, 2010 – Turock – Essen, Germany
- October 17, 2010 – Biebob – Vosselaar, Belgium

In an interview with the band conducted on August 22, 2010, guitarist Brendt Allman answered a question about the probability of touring again after the European dates as follows: "It's tough to say because there's a lot of different things going on in a lot of people's lives, but if we can do it once, we can probably do it twice."

The band has announced in 2013 that they will be playing live again. Their first announced headlining gigs are on May 5, 2013, at the U.S. progressive rock Rites of Spring festival (RoSfest) in Gettysburg, Pennsylvania, and on Friday, September 6, 2013, at the U.S. progressive metal festival ProgPower USA in Atlanta, Georgia. The month following the band heads over to Europe to perform at ProgPower Europe in Baarlo, Netherlands, on Friday, October 4. This will be Shadow Gallery's second headlining appearance at the Dutch progressive music festival and the band has stated they will play a special two hour set.

== Band members ==
=== Current ===
- Brendt Allman – guitar, backing vocals (1985–present)
- Carl Cadden-James – bass, backing and lead vocals, flute (1985–present)
- Gary Wehrkamp – guitar, keyboards, piano, backing vocals (1992–present)
- Joe Nevolo – drums (1997–present)
- Brian Ashland – lead vocals, guitar, keyboards (2009–present)

=== Former ===
- Kevin Soffera – drums (1994–1996)
- Chris Ingles – piano, keyboards (1985–2007)
- Mike Baker – lead vocals (1985–2008; his death)

Drum machines were used until 1994 and were credited as Ben Timely and John Cooney.

== Discography ==
Studio albums

- Shadow Gallery (1992)
- Carved in Stone (1995)
- Tyranny (1998)
- Legacy (2001)
- Room V (2005)
- Digital Ghosts (2009)

Compilation albums

- Prime Cuts (2007)
