= The Turtles Present the Battle of the Bands =

Studio album by The Turtles
- Released: November 1, 1968
- Recorded: 1968
- Studios: Gold Star (Hollywood, California)
- Genres: Pop; rock
- Length: 37:07
- Label: White Whale
- Producer: Chip Douglas

The Turtles chronology
Happy Together (1967)	The Turtles Present the Battle of the Bands (1968)	Turtle Soup (1969)

Singles from The Turtles Present the Battle of the Bands
- 1. "Elenore" Released: September 1968; 2. "You Showed Me" Released: December 1968

Professional ratings
Review scores
Source	Rating
Allmusic	4/5 stars
Rolling Stone	(negative)
Tom Hull	B−

The Turtles Present the Battle of the Bands is the fourth studio album released by the American rock band the Turtles. Produced by Chip Douglas (who returned to work with the Turtles after producing The Monkees' Headquarters and Pisces, Aquarius, Capricorn, and Jones LTD. albums), it was released in November 1968 by White Whale Records. It includes John Barbata's final recorded performances with the band; he left shortly after its release to join Crosby, Stills, Nash & Young. Barbata's eventual replacement, former Spanky and Our Gang drummer John Seiter, also contributed to the album. Some issues of the album were retitled Elenore.

It is a concept album, with the band pretending to be a series of different groups, playing in varying styles.

== Music ==
The Battle of the Bands is a pop and rock album which encompasses multiple styles of music, including country, psychedelic, and R&B.

As part of the album's concept, the Turtles adopted twelve different band names, and recorded twelve songs, each in a different genre or style, representing different groups competing in a mock Battle of the Bands. The outer cover shows the Turtles in evening dress, playing hosts of the "show", while the inside gatefold shows them in different costumes for each song. The entire album is filled with puns and hidden jokes. (According to liner notes on various Turtles CDs, White Whale Records was effectively a one-artist label with most of their hits coming from the Turtles, and the company was consistently pressuring the Turtles to come up with another "Happy Together," which resulted in "Elenore," a humorous reworking of the classic "happy pop" single.)

"Kamanawanalea" was a made-up Hawaiian idol ("the god of lust and perversion") with a pun name. The lyrics of "Food" included a recipe for brownies, with cannabis as a special ingredient. "Surfer Dan" was billed as being by The Cross Fires, a nod to the Turtles' previous incarnation as a surf-music band known as the Crossfires before it had signed with White Whale Records. "You Showed Me" was written by Roger McGuinn and Gene Clark of The Byrds, and it became the last major Turtles hit. The final song, "Earth Anthem," was recorded at 3:00 A.M. by candlelight, to capture the exact mood the Turtles wanted. "Can't You Hear the Cows" was supposed to be on the album but was rejected by the label for the photo of the band wearing cow heads.

"I'm Chief Kamanawanalea" has been sampled in many tracks, such as "Serious" by Philadelphian rapper Steady B, "Say No Go" by De La Soul and "Jimmy James" by the Beastie Boys. It was also used in an episode of the television show Life on Mars (U.S. version) in a discotheque scene.

"Buzzsaw" was also sampled by rapper/DJ D-Nice for his signature song "Call Me D-Nice," from his 1990 album of the same title.

== Charts and awards ==
The album peaked at number 128 on the Billboard Pop Albums chart, but its singles were more successful. "Elenore" and "You Showed Me" both reached number 6 on the Billboard Pop Singles chart. In Canada the album reached number 40.

== Track listing ==
All tracks are written by Johnny Barbata, Howard Kaylan, Al Nichol, Jim Pons, and Mark Volman, except as noted.

No.	Title	Writer(s)	"Band"	Length
1.	"The Battle of the Bands"	Harry Nilsson, Chip Douglas	The U.S. Teens featuring Raoul	2:14
2.	"The Last Thing I Remember"		The Atomic Enchilada	2:55
3.	"Elenore"		Howie, Mark, Johny, Jim & Al	2:31
4.	"Too Much Heartsick Feeling"		Quad City Ramblers	2:43
5.	"Oh, Daddy!"		The L.A. Bust '66	2:45
6.	"Buzzsaw"		The Fabulous Dawgs	1:59
7.	"Surfer Dan"		The Cross Fires	2:42
8.	"I'm Chief Kamanawanalea (We're the Royal Macadamia Nuts)"		Chief Kamanawanalea and his Royal Macadamia Nuts	1:34
9.	"You Showed Me"	James McGuinn, Gene Clark	Nature's Children	3:16
10.	"Food"		The Bigg Brothers	2:40
11.	"Chicken Little Was Right"		Fats Mallard and the Bluegrass Fireball	2:47
12.	"Earth Anthem"	Bill Martin	All	3:54

Sundazed Music CD re-issue bonus tracks
No.	Title	Writer(s)	Length
13.	"Sound Asleep"		2:29
14.	"The Story of Rock and Roll"	Harry Nilsson	2:38

Repertoire Records CD re-issue bonus tracks
No.	Title	Writer(s)	Length
13.	"Goodbye Surprise"		2:54
14.	"She's My Girl"		2:35
15.	"Sound Asleep"		2:29
16.	"Umbassa And The Dragon"		3:00
17.	"The Story of Rock and Roll"	Harry Nilsson	2:39
18.	"Can You Hear The Cows"		2:16
19.	"Elenore" (mono single mix)		2:33
20.	"You Showed Me" (mono single mix)		3:13

Manifesto Records (Flo and Eddie, Inc., 2016) CD re-issue bonus tracks
No.	Title	Writer(s)	Length
13.	"She's My Girl"
14.	"Chicken Little Was Right" (stereo single version)
15.	"Sound Asleep"
16.	"Umbassa The Dragon"
17.	"The Story of Rock and Roll"	Harry Nilsson
18.	"Can't You Hear the Cows"
19.	"The Last Thing I Remember (The First Thing I Knew)"
20.	"The Owl"
21.	"To See the Sun"
22.	"Earth Anthem" (previously unreleased alternate version)
23.	"Battle of the Bands Radio Spot"

== Personnel ==
The Turtles

- Howard Kaylan - lead vocals
- Mark Volman - vocals, special effects
- Al Nichol - guitars, organ, piano, Moog synthesizer, vocals
- Jim Pons - bass, vocals
- Johnny Barbata - drums, percussion, vocals

Additional personnel

- Chip Douglas - producer
- Gold Star Recording Studios - Studio
- Jim Hilton - engineer
- anonymous - strings, woodwinds, banjo on "Chicken Little Was Right"
- Lee Michaels - organ on "Buzzsaw"
- Arrangements by The Turtles and Chip Douglas
- Album layout designed by The Turtles
- Photography by Rod Dyer
