= The Very Air We Breathe =

Studio album by Driver side impact
- Released: May 29, 2007
- Recorded: Big Blue Meenie Studios
- Genre: Emo; Pop punk Post-hardcore
- Length: 47:14
- Label: Victory
- Producer: Sal Villanueva

Driver side impact chronology
Unknown (2006)	The Very Air We Breathe (2007)	Lion (2008)

Professional ratings
Review scores
Source	Rating
AbsolutePunk.net	76% link
Allmusic	link
Alt Press	(#244, p.147)

The Very Air We Breathe is the first album from pop punk/electronica band Driver Side Impact released in 2007, under Victory Records. It mixes elements of punk, post-hardcore, shoegaze, and electronica.

== Track listing ==
1. "Introduction" – 1:15
2. "Your Time to Shine" – 3:53
3. "The Heist" – 3:31
4. "Reasons We Sleep" – 4:04
5. "Made Of Gold" – 3:49
6. "Our Lives in Slow Motion" – 4:21
7. "Cadence and Cascade" – 1:20
8. "Cowboys and Indians" – 3:13
9. "We Are Your Own" – 5:07
10. "Life Like the Movies" – 5:02
11. "Walk the Plank" – 4:14
12. "Tonight...We Dance!" – 4:32
13. "The Artist" – 4:13
