= Age of Impact =

Studio album by Explorers Club
- Released: July 28, 1998
- Recorded: Sound Temple Studio, Oakland, California.
- Genre: Progressive metal Progressive rock
- Length: 53:30
- Label: Magna Carta
- Producer: Trent Gardner

Explorers Club chronology
Age of Impact (1998)	Raising the Mammoth (2002)

Professional ratings
Review scores
Source	Rating
Allmusic	4/5 stars

Age of Impact is Explorers Club's first album, released in 1998. The album included guest appearances by guitarists Steve Howe and John Petrucci, singer James LaBrie, bassist Billy Sheehan and drummer Terry Bozzio.

== Track listing ==
No.	Title	Writer(s)	Length
1.	"Impact 1 – Fate Speaks"	Trent Gardner	15:59
2.	"Impact 2 – Fading Fast"	Trent Gardner	8:44
3.	"Impact 3 – No Returning"	Trent Gardner	8:20
4.	"Impact 4 – Time Enough"	Trent Gardner	9:14
5.	"Impact 5 – Last Call"	Trent Gardner	11:09

== Personnel ==
- Bret Douglas (1), Matt Bradley (2), James LaBrie (3 & 5), D.C. Cooper (4) – lead vocals
- Trent Gardner – keyboards, trombone, lead vocals (5)
- Derek Sherinian (1), Matt Guillory (1 & 5) – keyboards
- Wayne Gardner – electric and acoustic guitars, bass
- John Petrucci – guitar
- Frederick Clarke – nylon string guitar
- James Murphy – guitar (1,4,5)
- Steve Howe – acoustic guitar (4)
- Billy Sheehan – bass
- Terry Bozzio – drums
- Brad Kaiser - MIDI percussion
- Michael Bemesderfer – flute, wind controller (3,4)

== Production ==
- Produced by Trent Gardner
- Engineered by James Murphy
- Mixed by Trent Gardner & Kevin Elson
- Mastered by Kevin Lee
