= Explorers Club (band) =

Band

- Origin: Vacaville, California, U.S.
- Genres: Progressive metal Progressive rock
- Years active: 1997–2016
- Labels: Magna Carta
- Spinoff of: Magellan, Dream Theater
- Past members: Trent Gardner; James LaBrie; John Petrucci; Terry Bozzio; John Myung; Kerry Livgren; Gary Wehrkamp; Matt Bradley; Derek Sherinian; Mark Robertson; Matt Guillory; Marty Friedman; Billy Sheehan; James Murphy; Steve Howe; Steve Walsh

Explorers Club was an American progressive metal/rock supergroup, formed and led by brothers Trent and Wayne Gardner of Magellan. Explorers Club featured multiple guests, including singer James LaBrie, guitarist John Petrucci and keyboardist Derek Sherinian (of Dream Theater), singer D. C. Cooper (Royal Hunt), drummer Terry Bozzio, bassist Billy Sheehan (UFO, Mr. Big) and guitarists Steve Howe (Yes), Marty Friedman (Megadeth) and James Murphy (Obituary). Their first album, Age of Impact was released to critical praise in 1998, and Raising the Mammoth was released in 2002, to a less favourable critical reception.

== Discography ==
=== Studio albums ===
- Age of Impact (1998)
- Raising the Mammoth (2002)
