= Raising the Mammoth =

Studio album by Explorers Club
- Released: August 20, 2002
- Recorded: Sound Temple Studio, Oakland, California.
- Genre: Progressive metal Progressive rock
- Length: 59:51
- Label: Magna Carta
- Producer: Trent Gardner

Explorers Club chronology
Age of Impact (1998)	Raising the Mammoth (2002)

Professional ratings
Review scores
Source	Rating
Allmusic	3/5 stars

Raising the Mammoth is Explorers Club's second album, released in 2002. It features appearances by former Kansas members Steve Walsh and Kerry Livgren, former Megadeth guitarist Marty Friedman and drummer Terry Bozzio. The album was mixed by longtime Rush co-producer Terry Brown.

== Track listing ==
All songs by Trent Gardner.

No.	Title	Length
1.	"Raising The Mammoth 1: Part One - Passage to Paralysis; Part Two - Broad Decay; Part Three - Vertebrates"	38:03: 15:03; 11:43; 11:17
2.	"Raising the Mammoth 2: AKA Prog-o-matic - Gigantipithicus (Instrumental)"	21:18

== Personnel ==
- Steve Walsh – lead vocals
- James LaBrie – lead vocals
- Kerry Livgren – guitar
- Marty Friedman – guitar
- Gary Wehrkamp – guitar
- Jeff Curtis – additional guitar
- Trent Gardner - keyboards
- Mark Robertson - keyboards
- John Myung - bass
- Hal 'Stringfellow' Imbrie - additional bass
- Terry Bozzio - drums, percussion

== Production ==
- Executive producers: Peter Morticelli and Mike Varney
- Produced by Trent Gardner
- Engineered and Mixed by Terry Brown
- Mastered by Jim Brick
