= Trent Gardner =

American musician (1961–2016)

- Born: 1961
- Origin: United States
- Died: June 11, 2016 (aged 54–55)
- Genres: Progressive rock, progressive metal
- Occupations: Songwriter, record producer, manager
- Instruments: Keyboards, trombone, singing
- Years active: 1985–2016
- Labels: Magna Carta, InsideOut
- Formerly of: Magellan, James La Brie, Leonardo the Absolute Man, Mullmuzzler, Explorers Club, Time Bandits, Steve Walsh
- Website: www.magellansongs.com

Trent Gardner (1961–2016) was an American progressive rock musician and producer. He died on June 11, 2016.

== Magellan (band) Discography ==
Music Video

- Icons - Music Video (2015)

Singles

- Icons (2015)
- 25 Or 6 To 4 (2014)
- Cynic's Anthem (2013)
- The Better Suite (2013)
- Good to Go? (2012)
- Keep It (2012)
- Hello, Goodbye (2012)
- Dust in the Wind (feat. Rob Lopez) (2012)

LP

- Innocent God (2007)
- Symphony for a Misanthrope (2005)
- Impossible Figures (2003)
- Hundred Year Flood (2002)
- Test of Wills (1997)
- Impending Ascension (1993)
- Hour of Restoration (1991)

== Trent's projects ==
- Magellan (band)
- Explorers Club: Age of Impact (1997)
- Explorers Club: Raising the Mammoth (2002)
- Encores, Legends & Paradox (A tribute to ELP - 1999)
- Steve Walsh : Glossolalia (2000)
- Leonardo: The Absolute Man (2001) : concept album about the life of Leonardo da Vinci
- Jack Foster III : The Evolution of JazzRaptor (2003)
- Jack Foster III : Raptorgnosis (2005)
- Jack Foster III : Tame Until Hungry (2007)
- Jack Foster III : Jazzraptor's Secret (2008)

== Guest Members ==
- John Petrucci (Dream Theater) - Guitar ("Age of Impact")
- James LaBrie (Dream Theater) - Vocals ("Age of Impact")
- Steve Howe (Yes) - Guitar ("Explorers Club (band)")
- Joey Franco (Twisted Sister, Van Helsing's Curse)- Drums and Orchestral percussion ("Hundred Year Flood")
- Jason Gianni - Drums (on "Impossible Figures")
- Tony Levin (John Lennon, King Crimson, Peter Gabriel) - Bass ("Hundred Year Flood")
- Ian Anderson (Jethro Tull (band)) - Flute ("Hundred Year Flood")
- George Bellas - Guitar ("Hundred Year Flood")
- Robert Berry (Alliance (band), 3 (1980s band)) - Guitar and Bass ("Hundred Year Flood")
- Brad Kaiser - Drums ("Test Of Wills")
- Hal Stringfellow Imbrie - Bass, Backing Vocals ("Hour of Restoration", "Impending Ascension")
- Doane Perry (Jethro Tull (band))- Drums ("Impending Ascension")
- Terry Bozzio (Frank Zappa) - Drums ("Age of Impact")

== Appearances ==
- Robert Lamm - Co-founder of Chicago (band) "Living Proof" (2012)
  - Songs: "Out Of The Blue" & "Living Proof" (Composition/Keyboards).
- James LaBrie "Mullmuzzler: Keep It To Yourself":
  - Songs: "Beelzebubba" (Trent Gardner - Keyboards/Trombone/Programming, Wayne Gardner - Horn Transcription)
  - "As A Man Thinks" (Trent Gardner - Spoken Words).
- James LaBrie "Mullmuzzler: 2":
  - Song: "Afterlife".
- James Murphy "Feeding the Machine":
  - Song:"Through Your Eyes (Distant Mirrors)" (Trent Gardner - Vocals).
- "December People - Sounds Like Christmas"
  - Song: "What Child Is This", "Happy X-mas/War Is Over".
- "America Our Home"
  - Song: "What Child Is This", "Happy X-mas/War Is Over".
- "The Moon Revisited" (Pink Floyd Tribute Album):
  - Song: "Money".
- "Tales From Yesterday" (Yes Tribute Album)
  - Song: "Don't kill the whale".
- "Supper's Ready" (Genesis Tribute Album)
  - Song: "Mama".
- "To Cry You A Song" (Jethro Tull Tribute Album)
  - Songs: "A Tull Tale", "Aqualung".
- "Working Man" (Rush Tribute Album)
  - Song: "Freewill".
- "Tribute to the Titans"
  - Songs: "Money", "Eclipse".
