= The Best of Flo & Eddie =

Greatest hits album by Flo & Eddie
- Released: 1987
- Genre: Rock
- Label: Rhino

Flo & Eddie chronology
The History of Flo & Eddie and the Turtles (1983)	The Best of Flo & Eddie (1987)	The Turtles featuring Flo & Eddie Captured Live (1992)

Professional ratings
Review scores
Source	Rating
Allmusic	4/5 stars

The Best of Flo & Eddie (Flo and Eddie: Mark Volman "Flo" and Howard Kaylan "Eddie") is a 1987 compilation consisting of selections from their first four albums on Warner Bros. and Columbia Records from 1972 to 1976. The last two tracks are from the films Dirty Duck (1974) and Texas Detour (1978).

== Track listing ==
All tracks composed by Mark Volman and Howard Kaylan; except where noted.

1. "Goodbye Surprise" (Bonner, Gordon)
2. "Feel Older Now" (Howard Kaylan)
3. "Nikki Hoi" (Kaylan, Mark Volman, Simmons)
4. "Another Pop Star's Life"
5. "Just Another Town"
6. "Afterglow" (Steve Marriott, Ronnie Lane)
7. "You're a Lady" (Peter Sarstedt)
8. "Marmendy Mill" (Volman, Kaylan, Steve Hunter, Bob Ezrin)
9. "Illegal, Immoral and Fattening"
10. "Rebecca" (Hammond, Hazlewood)
11. "Let Me Make Love to You"
12. "Mama, Open Up"
13. "Keep It Warm"
14. "Moving Targets"
15. "This Could Be the Day"
16. "Getaway (Back to L.A.)"
