= Elenore =

Single by the Turtles

from the album The Turtles Present the Battle of the Bands
- B-side: "Surfer Dan"
- Released: September 1968
- Genre: Pop rock
- Length: 2:31
- Label: White Whale
- Songwriters: Howard Kaylan, Mark Volman, Al Nichol, Jim Pons, John Barbata
- Producer: Chip Douglas

The Turtles singles chronology
"The Story of Rock and Roll" (1968)	"Elenore" (1968)	"You Showed Me" (1969)

"Elenore" is a 1968 song by the Turtles, originally included on The Turtles Present the Battle of the Bands. Although written by Howard Kaylan, its writing was co-credited to all five members of the band: Kaylan, Mark Volman, Al Nichol, Jim Pons, and John Barbata. The song was written as a satire of their biggest pop hit "Happy Together."

== Background ==
By 1968, the Turtles had had a number of successful pop records on the White Whale label, including Bob Dylan's "It Ain't Me Babe," "Happy Together," and "She'd Rather Be with Me," the latter two written by Gary Bonner and Alan Gordon. The band members wanted to diversify their musical output (in parallel with more innovative musical groups of the time) and to record their own material. However, their record company was reluctant to allow them to do so.

As a demonstration of their musical versatility, the Turtles recorded the album ...the Battle of the Bands, which featured performances in a wide variety of different musical styles. The band recorded "Elenore" as a parody of the type of happy-go-lucky pop songs they themselves had been performing, but with deliberately clichéd and slapdash lyrics such as: "Your looks intoxicate me / Even though your folks hate me / There's no one like you, Elenore, really"; and "Elenore, gee, I think you're swell / And you really do me well / You're my pride and joy, et cetera..."

The original lyrics used the phrase "fab and gear", which was replaced by the phrase "pride and joy".

This was one of the first pop songs to use the Moog synthesizer, which is heard during the first half of the second verse, featuring Kaylan's double voiced track plus Volman's harmonic supporting track.

Howard Kaylan later said:

Elenore was a parody of "Happy Together." It was never intended to be a straight-forward song. It was meant as an anti-love letter to White Whale [Records], who were constantly on our backs to bring them another "Happy Together." So I gave them a very skewed version. Not only with the chords changed, but with all these bizarre words. It was my feeling that they would listen to how strange and stupid the song was and leave us alone. But they didn't get the joke. They thought it sounded good. Truthfully, though, the production on "Elenore" WAS so damn good. Lyrically or not, the sound of the thing was so positive that it worked. It certainly surprised me.

According to his autobiography Shell Shocked, Kaylan stated that the Turtles had agreed that any song written by one or more members would be credited to the entire group. He added that he regretted this arrangement when "Elenore" became a hit. Describing the song in liner notes to the 1974 compilation Happy Together Again, Kaylan claimed to have written the song in an hour after locking himself in a hotel room. In his 2013 autobiography, he wrote that the time of composition was 30 minutes.

== Release ==
The song was produced by Chip Douglas and released as a single (White Whale 276). Cash Box called it a "delightful turn to the softer rock style," saying it is "a powerful vocal stew blending attractively over a medium-slow rhythm track."

"Elenore" reached No. 6 on the Billboard Hot 100 and also reached No. 7 on the UK Singles Chart, No. 4 in Canada, No. 8 in Australia, and No. 1 in New Zealand. It has since been included on many anthologies and as part of the soundtrack of The Boat That Rocked.

== Chart performance ==
=== Weekly charts ===
Chart (1968)	Peak position
US Billboard Hot 100	6
US Cash Box Top 100	5
Canadian RPM	4
Ireland (IRMA)	6
South Africa (Springbok)	6
UK	7
Australia	3
New Zealand (Listener)	1

=== Year-end charts ===
Chart (1968)	Rank
Canada	93
US Billboard Hot 100	80
US Cash Box	64

== Cover versions ==
- Flo & Eddie covered "Elenore" on their 1976 album Moving Targets.
- Me First and the Gimme Gimmes covered "Elenore" on their 2001 album Blow in the Wind.
