= Innocent God =

Studio album by Magellan
- Released: 2007
- Genre: Progressive metal, progressive rock
- Length: 45:25
- Label: Muse-Wrapped Records

Magellan chronology
Symphony for a Misanthrope (2005)	Innocent God (2007)

Professional ratings
Review scores
Source	Rating
DPRP	(6/10)

Innocent God is the seventh and final studio album by the progressive metal/rock band Magellan.

== Track listing ==
1. "Invisible Bright Man" - 6:20
2. "My Warrior" - 6:53
3. "Innocent God" - 9:22
4. "Found" - 6:56
5. "Who to Believe" - 5:15
6. "Sea of Detail" - 6:02
7. "Slow Burn" - 4:37

== Credits ==
- Trent Gardner — vocals, keyboards
- Wayne Gardner — vocals, guitar, bass
- Robert Berry — drums, guitar, bass guitar, percussion
