= Impending Ascension =

Studio album by Magellan
- Released: 1994
- Recorded: All songs recorded and mixed at Audio Production Group, Sacramento, Ca., October 1992-March 1993, except "Estadium Nacional" which was recorded and mixed at H.O.S. Studios in Menlo Park, Ca., June 1992.
- Genre: Progressive metal Progressive rock
- Length: 49:02
- Label: Magna Carta Records
- Producer: David Houston

Magellan chronology
Hour of Restoration (1991)	Impending Ascension (1994)	Test of Wills (1997)

Professional ratings
Review scores
Source	Rating
Allmusic	4.5/5 stars

Impending Ascension is the second studio album by the progressive metal/rock band Magellan.

== Track listing ==
All music and lyrics by Trent Gardner.

1. "Estadium Nacional" - 11:16
2. "Waterfront Weirdos" - 11:05
3. "Songsmith" - 5:33
4. "Virtual Reality" - 5:28
5. "No Time for Words" - 2:09
6. "Storms and Mutiny" - 11:50
7. "Under the Wire" - 1:42

== Personnel ==
Musicians:

- Trent Gardner - lead vocals, keyboards, backing vocals
- Wayne Gardner - electric and acoustic guitars, vocals
- Hal Stringfellow Imbrie - bass, vocals
- Doane Perry – drums on "Waterfront Weirdos" at Narnia Oaks Studio, Woodland Hills, Ca. All other drum tracks by Magellan.
- Hope Harris – female voice on "Virtual Reality"

Production:

- David Houston – engineer
- Shawn Lux – cover paintings and coat of arms c/o Lux Metals, Santa Rosa, Ca.
- Mike Martin – engineer
- Kenneth Lee Jr. – mastering at Rocket-Lab, San Francisco April 1993
- Trent Gardner – cover concept
- Wayne Gardner – Magellan portrait and "The Overseer & His Witnesses" painting
