= Hour of Restoration =

Studio album by Magellan
- Released: September 24, 1991
- Genre: Progressive metal Progressive rock
- Length: 43:36
- Label: Magna Carta Records
- Producer: Magellan

Magellan chronology
Hour of Restoration (1991)	Impending Ascension (1994)

Professional ratings
Review scores
Source	Rating
Allmusic	3/5 stars

Hour Of Restoration is the debut album by the band Magellan. It was released on September 24, 1991.

== Track listing ==
1. "Magna Carta" - 14:47
2. "The Winner" - 2:08
3. "Friends of America" - 3:29
4. "Union Jack" - 9:10
5. "Another Burning" - 5:05
6. "Just One Bridge" - 2:16
7. "Breaking These Circles" - 5:18
8. "Turning Point" - 1:25

== Credits ==
- Trent Gardner - lead vocals, keyboards
- Wayne Gardner - guitars, backing vocals
- Hal Stringfellow Imbrie - bass, backing vocals
- Magellan - drums, percussion
