= Flo & Eddie =

American rock duo

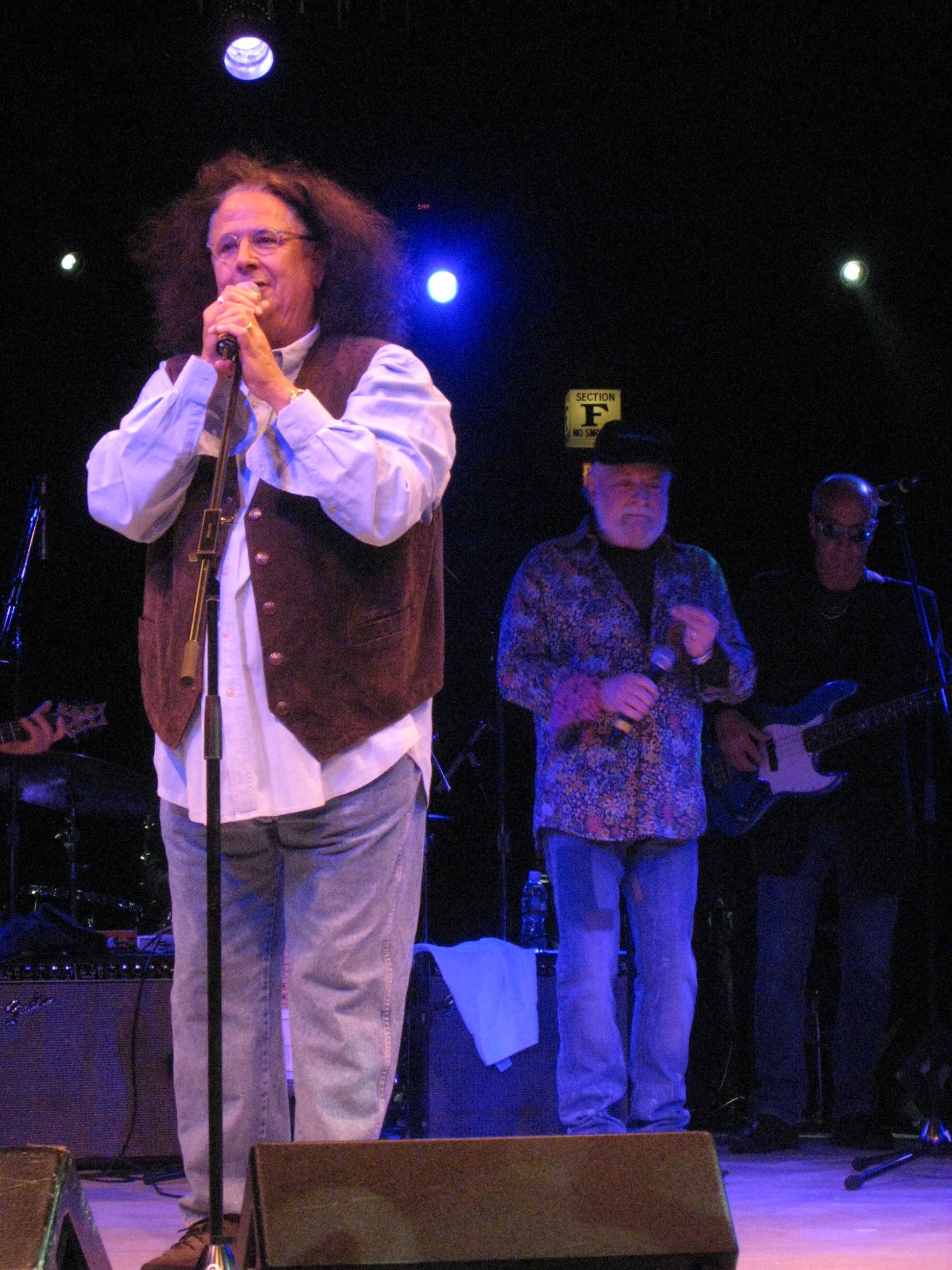
- Mark Volman ("Flo") (left) and Howard Kaylan ("Eddie") (right) in a 2008 tour

Background information
- Origin: Los Angeles, U.S.
- Genres: Comedy rock; pop rock
- Years active: 1971–2018
- Labels: Reprise; Warner Bros.; Columbia
- Spinoffs: Checkpoint Charlie
- Spinoff of: The Turtles; the Mothers of Invention
- Past members: Mark Volman; Howard Kaylan
- Website: theturtles.com

Flo & Eddie was an American rock duo consisting of Mark Volman (Flo, short for Phlorescent Leech) and Howard Kaylan (Eddie).

Kaylan and Volman were founding members of the mid-to late 1960s rock and pop band the Turtles. After the Turtles dissolved in 1970, Kaylan and Volman first joined Frank Zappa's band the Mothers of Invention as the 'Phlorescent Leech & Eddie'. Contractual restrictions imposed early in their career prevented Volman and Kaylan from using the name 'the Turtles', as well as their own names, in a musical context. "The Phlorescent Leech & Eddie" initially referred to Kaylan and Volman respectively, but they exchanged positions after Warner Bros. misprinted their debut album's cover, marking Volman as the "Phlorescent Leech" and Kaylan as "Eddie".

== History ==
=== Career beginnings ===
When the Mothers of Invention bandleader Frank Zappa was injured during a concert in London in 1971, Kaylan and Volman found themselves at an impasse, as the group was out of action for a time. They responded to this by recording The Phlorescent Leech & Eddie on Reprise Records with most of the other members of the Mothers of Invention. Although this album failed to chart, the duo continued to release albums, including the more successful Flo & Eddie; Illegal, Immoral and Fattening; Moving Targets; and Rock Steady with Flo & Eddie.

=== 1970s ===
During the 1970s, Kaylan and Volman continued to work as session musicians. They were backing vocalists on the T. Rex 1971 song "Get It On", singing the inadvertent extra chorus that "worked". The duo sang background vocals also on early T. Rex albums and were close friends of the band's vocalist Marc Bolan. The duo was also in good relations with Alice Cooper, and they were the opening act on the “School’s Out” show at the Circus Krone in Munich in November 1972 and on the "Billion Dollar Babies Tour" during the spring of 1973, going on to record background vocals for Cooper's albums From the Inside, Flush the Fashion and Zipper Catches Skin. The duo was also the house band for the Canadian TV talk show 90 Minutes Live with Peter Gzowski. They also sang background vocals on "Telephone Booth", a 1974 song by Hoyt Axton.

=== Early 1980s ===
The duo sang backing vocals also on Bruce Springsteen's first top ten hit on the Billboard chart, the 1980 song "Hungry Heart", while in 1982, they released a four-song EP on Rhino Records (RNEP 603) under the name Checkpoint Charlie. The record is a dark but whimsical take on late 1970s/early 1980s German synth-pop, new wave and techno music, such as D.A.F. and Kraftwerk.

=== Mid-1980s ===
In 1984, as 'The Turtles... featuring Flo & Eddie' (together with three other groups from the 1960s: Gary Puckett, Spanky and Our Gang, and the Association), they traveled across the U.S. and Canada as The Happy Together Tour. The following year, they got together with the Buckinghams, Gary Lewis and the Grass Roots, for a 1985 version. For the eight months the tour was on the road, it was consistently one of the top 10 grossing tours in the country.

=== 2000s ===
On August 1, 2013, Flo & Eddie, having gained ownership of the Turtles' recorded output, filed a lawsuit against satellite radio broadcaster SiriusXM for failing to pay sound-recording royalties in the states of New York, California, and Florida. On September 22, 2014, a California judge ruled that under state law, Sirius XM had to pay to digitally broadcast pre-1972 sound recordings. On June 22, 2015, a Florida judge ruled in favor of Sirius XM, as that state has no specific legislation concerning sound recording property rights. A few days later, Sirius XM agreed to pay $210 million to major record labels. On November 28, 2016, Sirius XM agreed to pay between $25–99 million to the pre-1972 song owners.

=== 2010s-2020s ===
During the summers of 2010 and 2011, Flo & Eddie had heavy touring schedules throughout the U.S., both as part of the Happy Together: 25th Anniversary Tour, along with the Grass Roots, the Buckinghams, Mark Lindsay, and the Monkees' member Micky Dolenz (2010 only).

In 2018, Kaylan retired from touring due to requiring heart and back surgery. Volman, who was suffering from Lewy body dementia, died after a short illness on September 5, 2025, at the age of 78.

=== Film and television work ===
They also had a collaboration with animation studio Murakami-Wolf-Swenson, dating back to when this company made the cartoon scenes in Zappa's film 200 Motels. Flo & Eddie did the music for their films Down and Dirty Duck and The Adventures of the American Rabbit, the television special Peter and the Magic Egg, and their Strawberry Shortcake television specials. The last one led the franchise creators at American Greetings to also bring in the duo for The Care Bears show.

== Discography ==
With Frank Zappa:

- Chunga's Revenge (1970)
- Fillmore East – June 1971 (1971)
- 200 Motels (soundtrack) (1971)
- Just Another Band from L.A. (1972)
- You Can't Do That on Stage Anymore, Vol. 1 (1988)
- You Can't Do That on Stage Anymore, Vol. 3 (1989)
- You Can't Do That on Stage Anymore, Vol. 6 (1992)
- Playground Psychotics (1992)
- Carnegie Hall (2011) [recorded October 11, 1971]

As Flo & Eddie:

- The Phlorescent Leech & Eddie (1972)
- Flo & Eddie (1973)
- Illegal, Immoral and Fattening (1975)
- Flo & Eddie Interview with Barry Mann, Special Promotion Record for Radio Stations (1975)
- Moving Targets (1976)
- Rock Steady With Flo & Eddie (1981)
- The History of Flo & Eddie and the Turtles (1983)
- The Best of Flo & Eddie (1987)
- The Turtles featuring Flo & Eddie Captured Live! (1992)
- New York "Times" (2009)

With John Lennon & Yoko Ono:

- Some Time in New York City (Side 4 only) (John Lennon & Yoko Ono) (1972)

Under Other Names:

- Checkpoint Charlie EP (1982)

Backing Vocals:

- T.Rex - T.Rex (1970)
- T.Rex – Electric Warrior (1971)
- Steely Dan – Everyone's Gone to the Movies (Demo) (1971)
- T.Rex - The Slider (1972)
- Ray Manzarek – The Golden Scarab (1973)
- Ray Manzarek – The Whole Thing Started With Rock and Roll & Now It's Out Of Control (1974)
- Roger McGuinn – Peace On You (1974)
- David Cassidy – The Higher They Climb (1975)
- Keith Moon – Two Sides of the Moon (1975)
- Stephen Stills – Illegal Stills (1976)
- Alice Cooper – From the Inside (1978)
- Alice Cooper – Flush the Fashion (1980)
- Bruce Springsteen – "Hungry Heart" from The River (1979)
- Van Wilks - Bombay Tears (1980)
- Blondie – Autoamerican (1981)
- The Knack - Radiating Love, Round Trip (1981)
- The Psychedelic Furs – Forever Now (1982)
- Alice Cooper – Zipper Catches Skin (1982)
- Paul Kantner – Planet Earth Rock and Roll Orchestra (album) (1983)
- Andy Taylor – Thunder (Andy Taylor album) (1987)
- Gavin Friday – Each Man Kills the Thing He Loves (1989)
- Jefferson Airplane – Jefferson Airplane (album) (1989)
- Southside Johnny & the Asbury Jukes – Better Days (1991)
- Ramones – Mondo Bizarro (1992)
- Duran Duran – Thank You (1995)
- Johnny Popstar Luv Explosion – Lizzy the Supermarket Drag Queen (1999)
- Adam Bomb – New York Times on Mc Douglas Street & NY Child (2001)

As producers:

- The Good Rats – From Rats to Riches (1978)
- DMZ – DMZ (self-titled LP) (1978)

== Filmography ==
- 200 Motels (1971) (members of the Mothers of Invention, special material)
- Down and Dirty Duck (1974) (voice work, music, additional story material)
- Texas Detour (1978) (music & lyrics)
- The World of Strawberry Shortcake (1980) (music)
- Strawberry Shortcake in Big Apple City (1981) (music)
- Strawberry Shortcake: Pets on Parade (1982) (music)
- Peter and the Magic Egg (1983) (music)
- Top Secret! (1984) (lyrics & special material)
- The Care Bears (1985) (TV series) (music)
- The Adventures of the American Rabbit (1986) (music)
- The True Story of Frank Zappa's 200 Motels (1989) (as themselves)
