= Digital Ghosts =

Studio album by Shadow Gallery
- Released: October 23, 2009
- Genre: Progressive metal; progressive rock
- Length: 64:15
- Label: Inside Out

Shadow Gallery chronology
Room V (2005)	Digital Ghosts (2009)

Professional ratings
Review scores
Source	Rating
Lords of Metal	(93/100)
Fury Rocks	(8/10)

Digital Ghosts is the sixth studio album by American progressive metal band Shadow Gallery. It was released on October 23, 2009, in Europe and November 3, 2009, in the United States. This is the first album since their former singer Mike Baker died on October 29, 2008.

== Track listing ==
No.	Title	Writer(s)	Lyrics	Length
1.	"With Honor"	Gary Wehrkamp	Carl Cadden-James; Wehrkamp	9:59
2.	"Venom"	Brendt Allman; Wehrkamp	Cadden-James; Wehrkamp	6:22
3.	"Pain"	Wehrkamp	Cadden-James	6:22
4.	"Gold Dust"	Allman; Wehrkamp	Cadden-James; Wehrkamp	6:45
5.	"Strong"	Allman; Wehrkamp	Cadden-James	6:50
6.	"Digital Ghost"	Allman; Wehrkamp	Cadden-James; Wehrkamp	9:37
7.	"Haunted"	Wehrkamp	Cadden-James	9:37
Total length:				55:29

Korean/Japanese Edition bonus track
No.	Title	Writer(s)	Lyrics	Length
8.	"Stingray (featuring D.C. Cooper)"	Allman; Wehrkamp	Cadden-James	8:43
Total length:				64:13

Special Edition bonus tracks
No.	Title	Length
8.	"Two Shadows"	5:08
9.	"Gold Dust" (demo)	6:01
10.	"In Your Window"	2:52
11.	"World of Fantasy" (demo)	4:38
Total length:		74:11

- "Two Shadows" is a reworked song (a Japanese bonus track from disc Room V) with vocals by Mike Baker.
- "Gold Dust" is a demo version of album song with vocals by Carl-Cadden James.
- "In Your Window" is a cappella version of the vocal harmonies from the album song "Digital Ghost".
- "World of Fantasy" is a demo version of a non-album song with vocals by Mike Baker.

Although the tracks on the album are the same as on the cover the ID tags are all wrong. The album comes up as Prime Cuts and the tracks come up as the first 11 tracks from Prime Cuts.

== Personnel ==
- Gary Wehrkamp – electric & acoustic guitars, bass guitar, keyboards, vocals, drums
- Brendt Allman – electric & acoustic guitars, bass guitar, keyboards, vocals
- Carl Cadden-James – bass guitar, fretless bass, flute, vocals (shares lead vocals on "Venom")
- Brian Ashland – lead vocals, guitar solo on "With Honor"
- Joe Nevolo – drums on "Venom" and "Gold Dust"

=== Additional musicians ===
- Ralf Scheepers (Primal Fear) – lead vocals on "Strong"
- Clay Barton (Suspyre) – lead vocals on "Venom"
- Srđan Branković (Expedition Delta, AlogiA) – guitars on "Strong"
- Vivien Lalu (Shadrane) – keyboards on "Gold Dust"
- Mike Baker – vocals on "Two Shadows" and "World of Fantasy"
