= Rock Steady with Flo & Eddie =

Studio album by Flo & Eddie
- Released: 1981
- Genre: Rocksteady; reggae
- Length: 40:17
- Label: Epiphany
- Producer: Mark Volman; Howard Kaylan; Earl 'Chinna' Smith; Errol Brown

Flo & Eddie chronology
Moving Targets (1976)	Rock Steady with Flo & Eddie (1981)	The History of Flo & Eddie and the Turtles (1983)

Rock Steady with Flo & Eddie, also known as Prince Flo & Jah Edward I, is the fifth studio album by Flo & Eddie. Released in 1981, the album consists of rocksteady and reggae music. The album was recorded at Tuff Gong Studios in Kingston, Jamaica under the production of Errol Brown.

== Production ==
Flo & Eddie had discovered reggae music due to the popularity of singer Bob Marley. Signing a contract with the Florida independent record label Epiphany, they were able to book recording time at Tuff Gong Studios in Kingston, Jamaica, and Errol Brown was tapped to produce the album. When Flo & Eddie arrived at the studio, they had prepared a list of Jamaican reggae and American pop songs to record. Brown tossed the list in a trash can and educated the duo on "'real' Jamaican music". At the time, Brown was mixing dub versions of reggae recordings in his uncle Duke Reid's catalog, and had a different vision for the Flo & Eddie album than they did. The resulting recordings consisted of many of Jamaica's most revered reggae songs, as well as reggae versions of the Ink Spots' "Prisoner of Love", and the Turtles' "Happy Together".

== Reception ==
Professional ratings
Review scores
Source	Rating
Allmusic	3.5/5 stars

The album was not commercially successful. The album was reissued by Rhino Records under the title Prince Flo & Jah Edward I, but it still failed to catch on. In a retrospective review, AllMusic's Jo-Ann Greene called it "A stunning album sadly lost to the sands of time."

== Track listing ==
1. "Prisoner of Love" - 3:58
2. "Swing and Dine" - 3:21
3. "Stop" - 2:12
4. "Moving Away" - 3:19
5. "Pearl" - 3:32
6. "Dancing Mood" - 3:11
7. "Party Time" - 3:05
8. "Sitting in the Park" (Billy Stewart) - 3:10
9. "Rock with Me" - 3:01
10. "Those Guys" - 3:14
11. "Just Like a River" - 3:16
12. "Happy Together" - 2:31

== Personnel ==
- Mark "Flo" Volman, Howard "Eddie" Kaylan - vocals
- Earl "Chinna" Smith - guitar
- Albert Wing, Dean Fraser, Enroy "Tenor" Grant - saxophone
- Walt Fowler - trombone
- Augustus Pablo, Leslie "Professor" Butler - piano, organ
- Phil Ramocon - Fender Rhodes
- Aston "Family Man" Barrett - bass guitar
- Carlton "Santa" Davis - drums
- Uziah "Sticky" Thompson - percussion
