= Test of Wills =

Test Of Wills

Studio album by Magellan
- Released: May 6, 1997
- Genre: Progressive metal; progressive rock
- Length: 55:18
- Label: Magna Carta Records

Magellan chronology
Impending Ascension (1994)	Test Of Wills (1997)	Hundred Year Flood (2002)

Professional ratings
Review scores
Source	Rating
AllMusic	3/5 stars

Test of Wills is the third studio album by the progressive metal/rock band Magellan.

== Track listing ==
1. "Gameface" - 4:30
2. "A Social Marginal" - 7:29
3. "Walk Fast, Look Worried" - 5:54
4. "Test of Wills" - 11:28
5. "Bully Pulpit (Part I)" - 2:01
6. "Jacko" - 4:23
7. "Crucible" - 5:00
8. "Preaching the Converted" - 5:31
9. "Critic's Carnival" - 9:02

== Personnel ==
- Trent Gardner - lead vocals, keyboards, trombone
- Wayne Gardner - guitars, bass, backing vocals
- Brad Kaiser - drums, percussion
