= Sherman Theater =

Building in Pennsylvania, United States

The Sherman Theater
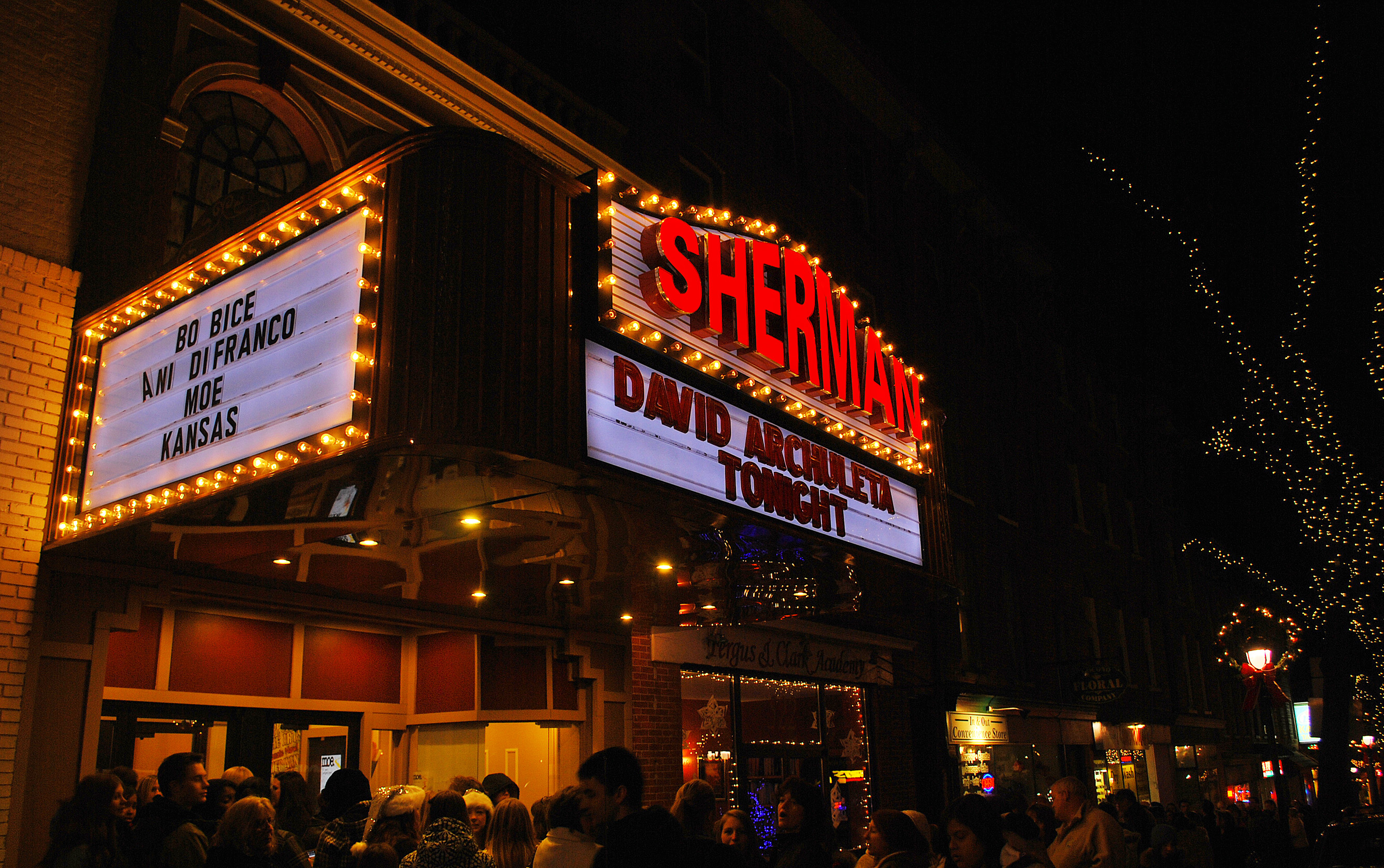
- The historic Sherman Theater on Main Street
- Interactive map of the The Sherman Theater area

General information
- Location: 524 Main Street, Stroudsburg, Pennsylvania, USA
- Coordinates: 40.9866°N 75.1913°W
- Completed: 1928

Design and construction
- Architects: Lacy & Rinker

The Sherman Theater is a not-for-profit concert hall and community theater located on Main Street in downtown Stroudsburg, Pennsylvania.

== History ==
Construction on the Sherman Theater was completed in 1928. The building was severely damaged by fire on August 14, 1944. For the majority of the life of the building, it was used as both a vaudeville house and movie theater. The theater fell into disrepair in the 1990s after ownership changed hands several times over the decades.

== Renovation and re-opening: 2004 ==
The renovation of the Sherman Theater was spearheaded by Richard and Catharine Berkowitz. The couple had a belief that the Downtown Stroudsburg region and the whole of Monroe County would be well served by reviving this hidden asset. It was planned to provide events for people of all ages especially teen to twenty somethings who currently had few options. After only three months of renovation, the Sherman Theater reopened its doors on July 16, 2004. The project quickly merged with a number of non profit groups and has been run by a 501c3 ever since. Under the Direction and Leadership of Richard Berkowitz, the Sherman Theater had steady growth funded largely by ticket sales and receiving logistical and technical support from a production company owned by Berkowitz The Sherman seats 1377 with all seats in, and can remove all of the seats which increases the standing-room capacity to 1800.

In 2008, the theatre was changed from private to non-profit.

== Recent events ==
Working as both promoters and operators of a concert venue, Richard Berkowitz and the Sherman Theater staff has brought in several high-profile concert events over the last five years or so including national acts like Megadeth, Lamb of God, Killswitch Engage, Clutch, Hatebreed, In Flames, Shadows Fall, Deftones, All That Remains, Volbeat, Hellyeah, Kyng, Iced Earth, Halestorm, Theory of a Deadman, Papa Roach, Patent Pending, Falling In Reverse, Trey Anastasio, Blues Traveler, Gin Blossoms, 311, Phil Vassar, Kansas, Derek Trucks, Sean Kingston, Michael Messina, Railroad Earth, Weird Al Yankovic, Keller Williams, Badfish, Blackmore's Night, moe., Train, Ratdog, David Archuleta, Leon Russell, and many others. The fastest sellout to date at the Sherman Theater was the July 5, 2010 concert with Furthur, which sold out in 8 minutes.

As part of a youth outreach initiative, Rich Berkowitz created the Sherman Independent Rock Series - a monthly rock concert series aimed at 13- to 21-year-olds. This concert series has featured headliners like Bayside, Valencia, Dawes, Driver Side Impact, Thriving Ivory, Crude Boi, and others. The series gave hundreds of young people a place to go a few times a month to listen to their favorite local band, play in a band and just have fun. Several bands from this series have gone on to international level success including Motionless in White and Patent Pending.

These concerts are all in addition to the many live community theater productions that are performed by the Sherman's in-house theater group, The Black Sheep Players. Productions have included Cinderella, High School Musical, Seussical The Musical, and Footloose, to name a few.

The Sherman Theater also hosts other events.

Rich Berkowitz positioned The Sherman Theater to become the driving force and organizer behind many of Stroudsburg's festivals, including the Pocono Raceway Festival, a free music and racing-themed festival that draws over 25,000 people to downtown Stroudsburg. Festival headliners in the past have included Molly Hatchet and The Marshall Tucker Band. In 2011, Blue Öyster Cult headlined the festival.

In April 2012 Berkowitz and the board of directors Completed the transfer of ownership of the Sherman theater building to the non profit group and opened up a small performance space called, The Sherman Theater's Living Room next door to the main venue. It was later renamed The Sherman Showcase. It is a small venue hosting local music and community events.

The Sherman theater has been the #2 Club Sized concert venue in the State of PA in 2011, 2012, 2013 according to www.pollstar.com
