= Illegal, Immoral and Fattening =

Live album with studio elements by Flo & Eddie
- Released: 1975
- Recorded: 1975
- Genre: Comedy rock
- Length: 38:05
- Label: Columbia
- Producer: Joe Wissert

Flo & Eddie chronology
| Flo & Eddie (1973) | Illegal, Immoral and Fattening (1975) | Moving Targets (1976) |

Professional ratings
Review scores
| Source | Rating |
|---|---|
| AllMusic | 4/5 stars |
| Christgau's Record Guide | C− |

Illegal, Immoral and Fattening is a 1975 comedy rock album recorded by Howard Kaylan ("Eddie") and Mark Volman ("Flo"). A majority of the album comes from live recordings, including three songs that first appeared in the 1974 film Down and Dirty Duck. Illegal, Immoral and Fattening and Moving Targets were reissued on a single compact disc in 2007 by Acadia Records.

== Track listing ==
=== Side one ===
1. "Illegal, Immoral and Fattening" (Kaylan, Volman) - 3:11
2. "Rebecca" (Albert Hammond, Michael Hazlewood) - 2:41
3. "Kama Sutra Time" (Kaylan, Volman, Jim Pons) - 6:40
4. "The Sanzini Brothers Return (With The Tibetan Memory Trick)" (Kaylan, Volman, Ian Underwood) - 2:50
5. "Livin' in The Jungle" (Kaylan, Volman) - 3:40

'The Sanzini Brothers' is a reference to the days with Frank Zappa: see Playground Psychotics

=== Side two ===
1. "Cheap" (Kaylan, Volman) - 2:40
2. "The Kung Fu Killer" (Kaylan, Volman) - 3:00
3. "Eddie Are You Kidding?" (Volman, Kaylan, Frank Zappa, John Seiter) - 2:22
4. "The Pop Star Massage Unit" (Kaylan, Volman) - 4:56
5. "Let Me Make Love To You" (Kaylan, Volman) - 2:20
6. "There's No Business Like Show Business" (Irving Berlin) - 3:40

"Eddie Are You Kidding?" is a cover of a song they did with Frank Zappa: see Just Another Band from L.A.

== Personnel ==
- Howard Kaylan - lead vocals
- Mark Volman - vocals, guitar
- Phil Reed - lead guitar
- Erik Scott - bass
- Andy Cahan - keyboards
- Craig Krampf - drums
- Danny Kootch - guitar on "Let Me Make Love To You"
- Leland Sklar - bass on "Let Me Make Love To You"
- Ian Underwood - keyboards on "Let Me Make Love To You"
- Aynsley Dunbar - drums on "Let Me Make Love To You"
