= Moving Targets (Flo & Eddie album) =

Studio album by Flo & Eddie
- Released: August 13, 1976
- Genre: Comedy rock
- Length: 35:22
- Label: Columbia
- Producers: Ron Nevison; Skip Taylor; Mark Volman; Howard Kaylan

Flo & Eddie chronology
Illegal, Immoral and Fattening (1975)	Moving Targets (1976)	Rock Steady With Flo & Eddie (1981)

Singles from Moving Targets
- 1. "Keep It Warm" b/w "Hot" Released: September 1976; 2. "Elenore" b/w "The Love You Gave Away" Released: October 1976

Professional ratings
Review scores
Source	Rating
AllMusic	4/5 stars

Moving Targets is a 1976 album by Flo & Eddie (Mark Volman and Howard Kaylan). Illegal, Immoral and Fattening and Moving Targets were reissued on a single compact disc in 2007 by Acadia Records.

The album features a guest appearance from Skyhooks lead singer Graeme "Shirley" Strachan on "Guns", singing background vocals during the chorus.

The song "Keep It Warm" is interpolated and sampled on rapper Gucci Mane's 2009 single "Lemonade" and, more recently, a portion of the song plays over the opening scene and end credits of the 2023 horror film Late Night with the Devil. It also features in the 2025 film Him.

== Track listing ==
All tracks composed by Mark Volman and Howard Kaylan; except where noted.

=== Side one ===
1. "Mama, Open Up" – 4:10
2. "The Love You Gave Away" – 3:31
3. "Hot" – 3:25
4. "Best Friends (Theme from the Unsold T.V. Pilot)" – 2:02
5. "Best Possible Me" – 4:03

=== Side two ===
1. "Keep It Warm" – 4:16
2. "Guns" – 3:57 (Jim Pons, Volman, Kaylan)
3. "Elenore" – 2:10 (Kaylan, The Turtles)
4. "Sway When You Walk" – 2:02
5. "Moving Targets" – 4:40

== Personnel ==
Flo & Eddie Band

- Howard Kaylan – vocals
- Mark Volman – vocals, guitars
- Phil Reed – lead guitar
- Andy Cahan – keyboards
- Erik Scott – bass
- Craig Krampf – drums

Additional personnel

- Donnie Dacus – slide guitar on "Hot"
- Jeff Baxter – slide guitar on "Hot"
- Graeme "Shirley" Strachan – chorus vocals on "Guns"
- Ian Underwood – saxophone on "Moving Targets"
- Allan MacMillan – strings and horns arranged/conducted
