= Hundred Year Flood =

Studio album by Magellan
- Released: September 10th, 2002
- Genre: Progressive metal Progressive rock
- Length: 51:12
- Label: Magna Carta Records

Magellan chronology
Test of Wills (1997)	Hundred Year Flood (2002)	Impossible Figures (2003)

Professional ratings
Review scores
Source	Rating
Allmusic	3/5 stars

Hundred Year Flood is the fourth studio album by the progressive metal/rock band Magellan.

== Track listing ==
The first song on the album is actually split into 13 individual tracks.

1. "The Great Goodnight" - 34:27
2. "Family Jewels" (instrumental) - 5:53
3. "Brother's Keeper" - 10:52

== Credits ==
- Trent Gardner - lead vocals, keyboards, trombone
- Wayne Gardner - guitars, bass, keyboards, backing vocals
- Joe Franco - drums
- Tony Levin – bass
- Ian Anderson – flute
- George Bellas – guitar
- Robert Berry – bass, guitar
