= Flo & Eddie (album) =

Studio album by Flo & Eddie
- Released: 1973
- Studio: Record Plant, New York City; Sunset Sound, Los Angeles; Paramount Recording Studios, Los Angeles
- Genre: Rock
- Label: Reprise
- Producer: Bob Ezrin

Flo & Eddie chronology
The Phlorescent Leech & Eddie (1972)	Flo & Eddie (1973)	Illegal, Immoral and Fattening (1975)

Professional ratings
Review scores
Source	Rating
AllMusic	4/5 stars

Flo & Eddie is the second album from Flo & Eddie. After being out of print since the 1970s, it was released on CD for the first time in 2008 in a package that includes their first album, The Phlorescent Leech & Eddie (1972).

The album was produced by Bob Ezrin, who was the producer for Alice Cooper. The album was made to accompany the Alice Cooper Billion Dollar Babies world tour in 1973–74, for which Flo & Eddie were the opening act.

== Track listing ==
=== Side one ===
1. "If We Only Had the Time" (Kaylan, Volman, John Seiter)
2. "Days" (Ray Davies)
3. "You're a Lady" (Peter Sarstedt)
4. "Carlos and the Bull" (Kaylan, Volman, Barnaby Conrad)
5. "Afterglow" (Steve Marriott, Ronnie Lane)

=== Side two ===
1. "Best Part of Breaking Up" (Phil Spector, Vince Poncia, Peter Andreoli)
2. "The Sanzini Brothers" (Volman, Kaylan, Ian Underwood)
3. "Another Pop Star's Life" (Volman, Kaylan)
4. "Just Another Town" (Kaylan, Volman)
5. "Marmendy Mill" (Kaylan, Volman, Bob Ezrin, Dick Wagner)

== Personnel ==
- Howard Kaylan – vocals
- Mark Volman – vocals, guitar
- Gary Rowles – lead guitar
- John Herron – keyboards
- Jim Pons – bass
- Aynsley Dunbar – drums

=== Additional personnel ===
- Bob Ezrin – piano
- John Sebastian – vocals
- Steve Hunter – guitar
- Dick Wagner – guitar
- Steve Madaio – trumpet
- Allan MacMillan – orchestra arrangements
- Produced by Bob Ezrin
- Engineered by Jack Douglas – Shelly Yakus
- Executive producer – Larry Heller
- Recorded at Sunset Sound, Paramount in Los Angeles and The Record Plant in New York City
- George Whiteman – photography
- Pacific Eye & Ear – design
