= Magellan (band) =

Progressive metal group

- Origin: San Francisco, California, United States
- Genres: Progressive metal, progressive rock
- Years active: 1985–2016
- Labels: Magna Carta, InsideOut
- Spinoffs: Explorers Club
- Past members: Trent Gardner; Wayne Gardner
- Website: magellansongs.com

Magellan were an American progressive metal/rock band formed in San Francisco, California, United States, by brothers Trent and Joel Wayne Gardner in 1985. The band's albums featured a number of well-known guest musicians, such as Ian Anderson, drummer Joey Franco, and bassist Tony Levin. The group co-wrote songs with Chicago frontman Robert Lamm on his album, Living Proof (2012).

In February 2014, Wayne Gardner committed suicide. On June 11, 2016, Trent Gardner died of undisclosed reasons.

== Members ==
- Trent Gardner - lead vocals, keyboards, trombone (1985–2016)
- Wayne Gardner - guitars, bass, keyboards, backing vocals (1985–2014)

=== Guest members ===
- Joey Franco (Twisted Sister, Van Helsing's Curse) – drums and orchestral percussion (Hundred Year Flood)
- Jason Gianni – drums (on Impossible Figures)
- Alan Sweeney – keytar (on Impossible Figures)
- Tony Levin (John Lennon, King Crimson, Peter Gabriel) – bass (Hundred Year Flood)
- Ian Anderson (Jethro Tull) – Flute (Hundred Year Flood)
- George Bellas – guitar (Hundred Year Flood)
- Robert Berry (Alliance, 3) – guitar and bass (Hundred Year Flood)
- Brad Kaiser – drums (Test of Wills)
- Hal Stringfellow Imbrie – bass, Backing vocals (Hour of Restoration, Impending Ascension)
- Doane Perry (Jethro Tull) – drums (Impending Ascension)

== Discography ==
=== Albums ===
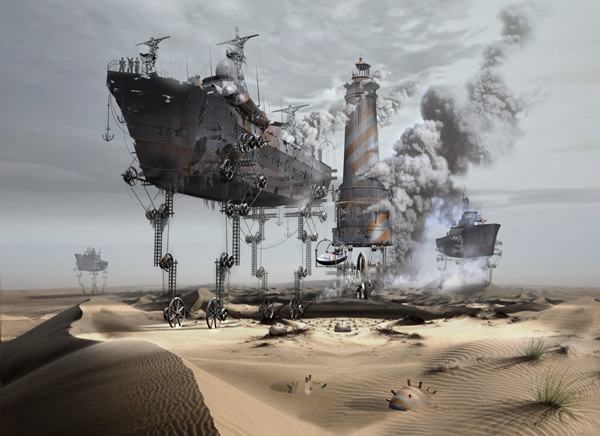
Dehydration by George Grie 2006, the cover-art has been licensed by Wayne Gardner for the album Inert Momentum

- Hour of Restoration (Magna Carta, 1991)
- Impending Ascension (Magna Carta, 1994)
- Test of Wills (Magna Carta, 1997)
- Hundred Year Flood (Magna Carta, 2002)
- Impossible Figures (Inside Out, 2003)
- Symphony for a Misanthrope (Inside Out, 2005)
- Innocent God (Muse-Wrapped Records, 2007)

=== Singles ===
- "Dust in the Wind" (featuring Rob Lopez) (2012)
- "Hello,Goodbye" (2012)
- "Keep It" (2012)
- "Good to Go?" (2012)
- "The Better Suite" (2013)
- "Cynic's Anthem" (2013)
- "25 or 6 to 4" (2014)
- "Icons" (2015)
