= The Good Rats =

American band

- Origin: Long Island, New York, United States
- Genres: Rock, blues, hard rock
- Years active: 1964–present
- Labels: Kapp, Warner Bros., Platinum Records, Passport Records, Radar, Harvest, Mercury, Mondo Records, Fireball Records, Uncle Rat Music
- Members: Stefan Marchello; Matt McCarthy; Joe DiBiase; Joey DiBiase
- Past members: Peppi Marchello (died 2013); Ted Haenlein; Frank Stapleton; Eric Crane; Denny Ryan; Art Fahie; Jim Roberge; Mickey Marchello; John Gatto; Lenny Kotke; Joey Franco; Bruce Kulick; Schuyler Deale; Charlie Zarou; George Tebbitt; Eddie Jelley; Randy Coven; Gene Marchello; Mike Haupt; Matt McCarthy; Joe Novello; John Argento; Dean Guiffrida; Everet Almond; Terry Guy; Mike Brenna; Evan Walters; Mike Raffinello; Daniel Ratchford

The Good Rats are an American rock band from Long Island, New York. Their music mixes elements of rock with blues and pop. They are best known on their native Long Island, although they had some success nationally and internationally.

== History ==
Formed in 1964, the original group consisted of five students from St. John's University in Queens, New York: Ted Haenlein, Frank Stapleton (Frank never plugged in his bass as he did not play it, but it looked good on stage), Eric Crane, Denny Ryan and Peppi Marchello. The group was originally called the U-Men and played most of their gigs in the Rockaways (Peyton Place & McNultys) and Long Island (The Attic, Tiger's Tail etc.)

In 1966, Stapleton's brother, John, arranged for the group to play at a club in Queens, New York (The John Doe Room) where a record company executive heard them and eventually signed the band, but suggested a name change was in order. The band continued to play top 40 covers while working on their own original music.

By the fall of 1966 the composition of the band had changed with Peppi's brother Micky on guitar, Denny Ryan on drums, Teddy H. on rhythm & singing, and Art Fahie (aka/ Crazy Artie) on bass. The introduction of the "Rats" to Long Island's northshore took place at a club called the "Knotty Knee", whose owners Jack Dowd & Al Cunningham trusted the group to fill the venue seven nights per week. A few years later, Marty Ross took ownership of the place under the name "McDimples", and for a while everything went on as it had been. The "Rats" were also known for playing "The Cage" in Williston Park, as well as "The Go-Go 7" in Port Washington. In 1968, "Teddy" Haenlein was drafted and went to Vietnam, but did rejoin the group from 1970 to 1972.

In 1969, the band released their first album, the self-titled The Good Rats which had cult popularity with New Yorkers local and transplanted when it launched. Two of its more memorable cuts are the intro song: "We Are The Good Rats" where the band members sing the "hello-hello-hello" greeting used by the 3 Stooges; and the landmark "Joey Ferrari", a proto-punk song ("Joey Ferrari, though you're from the poor side, don't give you no right to go wild"). The Good Rats continued to build a following, playing Long Island's thriving club scene, along with other groups, such as Twisted Sister and Zebra. From 1970 until early 1972, the band consisted of Peppi, Mickey, Teddy (guitar) John Argento (bass) and Charlie Zarou (drums). They played weekly at The Baldwin Manor, Back Alley Sallys (of which Peppi and John Argento took on a partnership of the bar). The Rats doing cover tunes, adding originals in, till originals were primarily asked for, during this time songs such as "Hour Glass", "Injun Joe", "Mean Mother", "Yellow Flower", were requested by a fan base that continued to grow rapidly. A rare studio recorded LP, recorded and mastered at Echo Studios, East Meadow, was used for shopping the band to record companies.

In 1974, the Good Rats released their best-known and most popular album, Tasty. It featured a blend of hard rock and blues, highlighted by Marchello's raspy vocals. Various songs from this record, including "Injun Joe", "Papa Poppa", "Back to My Music" and "Songwriter", and the blues title track, received airplay around the country on FM radio. During the following years, the Rats performed at venues such as Madison Square Garden, The Philadelphia Spectrum, The Nassau Coliseum, the Hammersmith Odeon in England, and New York's Central Park, as well as showcase rooms such as The Bottom Line (Manhattan), My Father's Place (Roslyn, New York), Whiskey a Go Go (Los Angeles), Casino Arena (Asbury Park, NJ) and The Paradise Room (Boston). They headlined or opened for bands such as Rush, Journey, Kiss, Meat Loaf, Aerosmith, Ozzy Osbourne, The Grateful Dead, Bruce Springsteen, The Allman Brothers Band, Mountain and Styx.

Between 1976 and 1980, The Good Rats released a series of albums, including Ratcity in Blue, From Rats to Riches (1978), Birth Comes to Us All, and Live At Last, all of which were well received by the band's fan base, and received some airplay on FM radio. In 1981, Gatto and Kotke left the band, and were replaced by future Kiss guitarist Bruce Kulick and bass player Schuyler Deale (who later played with Billy Joel and Michael Bolton), for the album Great American Music. The band did shows until 1983 and then broke up.

Throughout the 1980s, Peppi Marchello continued to write and produce recordings with his son Gene. They toured locally for a while under the name "Popzarocca" until the song "First Love" became a minor hit for Gene's band, Marchello. Marchello also recorded a music video for "First Love", and had received minor airplay on MTV's Headbangers Ball. This band featured Gene on guitar and lead vocals, drummer John Miceli (Meat Loaf, Rainbow, and bassist Nick DiMichino (NineDays [Something To Listen To, Monday Songs, Three, The Madding Crowd, So Happily Unsatisfied, Flying the Corporate Jet]), (Matt White [Best Days]). The band recorded two albums (only one which was released).

In the mid-1990s, Marchello and sons Gene Marchello and Stefan Marchello began playing out locally under "The Good Rats" name. They released three new studio CDs with this lineup, Tasty Seconds (1996), Let's Have Another Beer (2000), and Play Dum (2002). Marchello also released a live recording of a 1979 appearance on a Rochester radio show, Rats, The Way You Like ’Em.

In 1998, Marchello wrote "A Tale of Two Balls," the introduction to the book Conflicts of Disinterest (Aardwolf Publishing) by Clifford Meth.

In the 2000s, the band continued to play in local venues throughout New York, Long Island, New Jersey and Connecticut, as well as playing annually in their own summer weekend outdoor festival aptly named "Ratstock". At one point, the "new" Good Rats (Peppi and his sons) performed as the opening act for a reunion performance by the "old" Good Rats. Billed as "The Original Good Rats" Peppi was joined by Mickey, Kotke, Franco, and Gatto on October 4, 2008, in a small venue on Long Island, and for a pair of sold-out shows at B.B. King's in Manhattan.

In 2008, Gene Marchello left the band to go out on his own. Nevertheless, The Good Rats, featuring Peppi and Stefan Marchello continued playing weekend club dates around Long Island.

The Good Rats were inducted into the Long Island Music Hall of Fame in 2008.

Peppi Marchello is quoted prominently in the IDW Publishing graphic novel Snaked by Clifford Meth and has been the subject of other stories by the author.

In July, 2009, Peppi Marchello cut a series of three commercials for the car donation organization Kars4Kids.

In Magnolia Pictures 2011 release Roadie, the character Nikki pulls out Ratcity in Blue from Jimmy's vinyl record collection and they listen to a couple of tracks starting with "Advertisement in the Voice". This brings back memories of them seeing the band every Saturday night with their friend Steph when they were in high school. Peppi Marchello makes a cameo appearance in the film.

In 2012, Peppi Marchello released a new Good Rats album, Blue Collar Rats: The Lost Archives on his Uncle Rat Music label. The CD contained one new song plus 19 previously unreleased songs recorded between 1975 and 1984, some featuring the original Good Rats line-up, and others including Kulick, Deale, Gene Marchello and various other musicians.

The Original Good Rats continued to play two spring shows (in one night) annually at Manhattan's B.B. King's, as well as a show in the fall at "The Crazy Donkey" in Long Island, until 2013.

Peppi Marchello died on July 10, 2013, of a heart attack at his Nissequogue home. He was 68 and was recovering from heart surgery he had in June.

Aardwolf Publishing announced the publication of Peppi Marchello: Song Writer on Kickstarter.

In 2014, Stefan Marchello released a posthumous album of material that he and Peppi had worked on before Peppi's death, titled Afterlife. In 2016, he released Making Rock and Roll Great Again, an album that contains more of Peppi Marchello's posthumous material, plus some original material by Stefan Marchello.

The band now continues with Stefan Marchello. Stefan played with Peppi for 23 years.

== Discography ==
- The Good Rats (1969)
- Tasty (1974)
- Ratcity in Blue (1976)
- From Rats to Riches (1978)
- Rats The Way You Like It - Live (1979 - only promo copies)
- Rats The Way You Like Em ! (1979)
- Birth Comes To Us All (1979)
- Live At Last (1980)
- Great American Music (1981)
- Tasty Seconds (1996)
- Let's Have Another Beer (2000)
- Play Dum (2002)
- Blue Collar Rats: The Lost Archives (2012)
- Afterlife (2014)
- Making Rock and Roll Great Again (2016)
