= The Phlorescent Leech & Eddie =

The Phlorescent Leech and Eddie

Studio album by Flo & Eddie
- Released: September 1972
- Studio: Bolic Sound, Inglewood, California
- Genre: Rock
- Label: Reprise
- Producer: Mark Volman; Howard Kaylan

Flo & Eddie chronology
The Phlorescent Leech and Eddie (1972)	Flo & Eddie (1973)

Professional ratings
Review scores
Source	Rating
Allmusic	Allmusic review
Christgau's Record Guide	B+

The Phlorescent Leech and Eddie is the first album from Flo & Eddie, released in 1972. It was made available on CD for the first time in 2008.

== Track listing ==
All tracks written by Mark Volman and Howard Kaylan except where noted.

=== Side one ===
1. "Flo & Eddie Theme"
2. "Thoughts Have Turned"
3. "It Never Happened" (Volman)
4. "Burn the House" (Volman)
5. "Lady Blue" (Kaylan)
6. "Strange Girl" (Kaylan)
7. "Who But I"

=== Side two ===
1. "I Been Born Again"
2. "Goodbye Surprise" (Gary Bonner, Alan Gordon)
3. "Nikki Hoi" (Volman, Kaylan, Jeff Simmons)
4. "Really Love" (Volman)
5. "Feel Older Now" (Kaylan)
6. "There You Sit Lonely"

== Personnel ==
- Howard Kaylan - vocals; guitar on "Lady Blue"
- Mark Volman - vocals, guitar
- Gary Rowles - lead guitar
- Don Preston - keyboards
- Jim Pons – bass, mandolin
- Aynsley Dunbar - drums
- Lynn Blessing - vibraphone
- Barry Keene - narrator on "Nikki Hoi"
- Moe Lakai & The Island Singers - backing vocals on "Nikki Hoi"
- Claude Williams - trumpet on "I Been Born Again"

Technical

- Produced by Mark Volman and Howard Kaylan
- Engineered by Barry Keene
- Larry Heller - executive producer
- Recorded at Ike Turner's Bolic Sound in Inglewood, California
- Gary Burden - art direction
- Henry Diltz - photography
