= Driver Side Impact =

American rock band (2006–2012)

- Origin: Cleveland, Ohio
- Years active: 2006–2012
- Label: Victory
- Past members: Chris Rock, Mark Woodbridge, Andrew Riccatelli, Jehiel Winters, Branden Langhals, Austin Bishop, Teddy Feighan, Jack McGinty, Mikey Arnold

Driver Side Impact was an American emo-hardcore band from Cleveland, Ohio, United States.

== History ==
Driver Side Impact was formed in 2004 in Cleveland Ohio. Their debut EP in 2006 garnered a massive cult-following, leading to the group signing a five-album deal with Victory Records, who issued their full-length The Very Air We Breathe in 2007. The Very Air We Breathe was recorded at Big Blue Meenie Recording Studio with producers Tim Gilles and Sal Villanueva, and was noted for its experimental atmospheric elements and its superb percussion instrumentation. After nationwide tours with Mayday Parade and Bayside, the band released their follow-up full length, Lion, in 2008. Soon after the album's release, Zach Evans, Austin Bishop and Teddy Feighan stepped away to focus on other pursuits. The original lineup of Jack, Teddy, Branden, Zach, Austin and Mikey would eventually be fully replaced with other artists, but no subsequent albums were released.

== Members ==
- Chris Reck – lead vocals
- Mark Woodbridge – guitars/vocals
- Andrew Riccatelli – drums/percussion
- Jehiel Winters – bass/vocals

== Past members ==
- Austin Bishop – guitar, keyboard, programming, vocals
- Teddy Feighan – bass
- Branden Langhals – vocals
- Zach Evans – drums
- Mikey Arnold – guitar
- Jack McGinty – guitar/back-up vocals

== Discography ==
- We Will Disappear EP (2006)
- The Very Air We Breathe (Victory Records, 2007)
- Lion (Victory Records, 2008)
- Double Vision EP (2010)
