= Van Helsing's Curse =

Music project of Dee Snider

- Genres: Heavy metal, progressive metal, symphonic metal
- Labels: Koch Records, Fangoria Music

Van Helsing's Curse is a side project, orchestra of former Twisted Sister lead singer, Dee Snider. Along with Snider, the group featured a five-piece rock band, a six-piece choir, and six-piece string section.

== History ==
Snider came up with the idea for the group after seeing a Trans-Siberian Orchestra concert but he wanted an orchestra that featured a Halloween theme. The group, named after fictional vampire hunter Abraham Van Helsing, would release their first album in 2003 under the title Oculus Infernum, which in Latin means "eye of hell." The concept album, narrated by Snider himself, tells the fictional story of a young boy, orphaned after an entity murders all the adults in his town. The child, then wanting revenge, comes upon one of the descendants of Van Helsing and teams with him to try and put an end to the entity.

That same year, the band worked with Six Flags to create Van Helsing's Curse Fireworks Spectacular, a Halloween-themed fireworks show exclusive to Fright Fest at Six Flags Great Adventure. The show used Oculus Infernum as its soundtrack, and the album was sold inside most of the park's gift shops.

The band began touring in 2004 and later released a DVD of the concert entitled Live in Philly '05.

== Discography ==
- Oculus Infernum (2003)
