= Joey Franco =

American drummer

Joe Franco
- Born: 1951 (age 74–75)
- Occupation: Drummer
- Formerly of: The Good Rats, Twisted Sister, Widowmaker

Joe "Seven" Franco (born 1951) is an American drummer best known for his work with the band The Good Rats in the late 1970s and later as a member of Twisted Sister.

== Biography ==
Joe Franco, a 1969 graduate of Brooklyn Technical High School, became a member of the band The Good Rats in 1972. He also produced and played in the horror rock band Van Helsing's Curse, which also featured Twisted Sister lead vocalist Dee Snider, and on the Magellan album Hundred Year Flood. Franco replaced A. J. Pero in Twisted Sister in 1986, and stayed in the band for about a year until its break-up in 1987. He also played in Snider's group Widowmaker, and with guitarists Vinnie Moore and Blues Saraceno, as well as with former Kansas vocalist Steve Walsh on his solo album Shadowman.

Franco is the author of the book Double Bass Drumming (1984; Alfred, 1993) and is featured in the accompanying video (1988; Warner Bros., 2005). He has also lectured and written articles about drumming and is a music producer involved in recording and post-production work as owner of Beatstreet Productions in the Flatiron District of New York City, New York.
