= Mike Baker (singer) =

- Born: Michael Allen Baker; September 2, 1963
- Died: October 29, 2008 (aged 45)
- Genres: Progressive rock, progressive metal
- Occupation: Singer-songwriter
- Instruments: Vocals, bass
- Years active: early 1980s – 2008
- Labels: Magna Carta, Inside Out Music
- Formerly of: Shadow Gallery

Mike Baker (September 2, 1963 – October 29, 2008) was the lead vocalist for the American progressive metal band Shadow Gallery.

== Biography ==
Baker was an integral part in the formation of Shadow Gallery in 1985 when the band was known as Sorcerer at the time of their inception. Heavily influenced by singers Alice Cooper, Ronnie James Dio of Black Sabbath, Rob Halford of Judas Priest, and Bruce Dickinson of Iron Maiden, Baker integrated the musical attributes of these bands and vocalists into his style of singing.

Baker was primarily a self-taught vocalist, originally starting out as bass player during high school. Finding it difficult to sing and play bass simultaneously, he dropped the bass and switched over to lead vocal duties. Before forming Sorcerer, in the early 1980s he performed vocals on demos with local bands, including Nasty Nasty and Axxis.

Baker also performed guest vocals on the second single Day Sixteen: Loser from Ayreon's 2004 album The Human Equation and on the Original Cast of Leonardo: The Absolute Man amongst others.

According to an email sent to the Shadow Gallery News email list on October 31, 2008, Baker died after suffering a heart attack on October 29, 2008, at the age of 45.
