= The Turtles discography =

Cataloging of published recordings by The Turtles

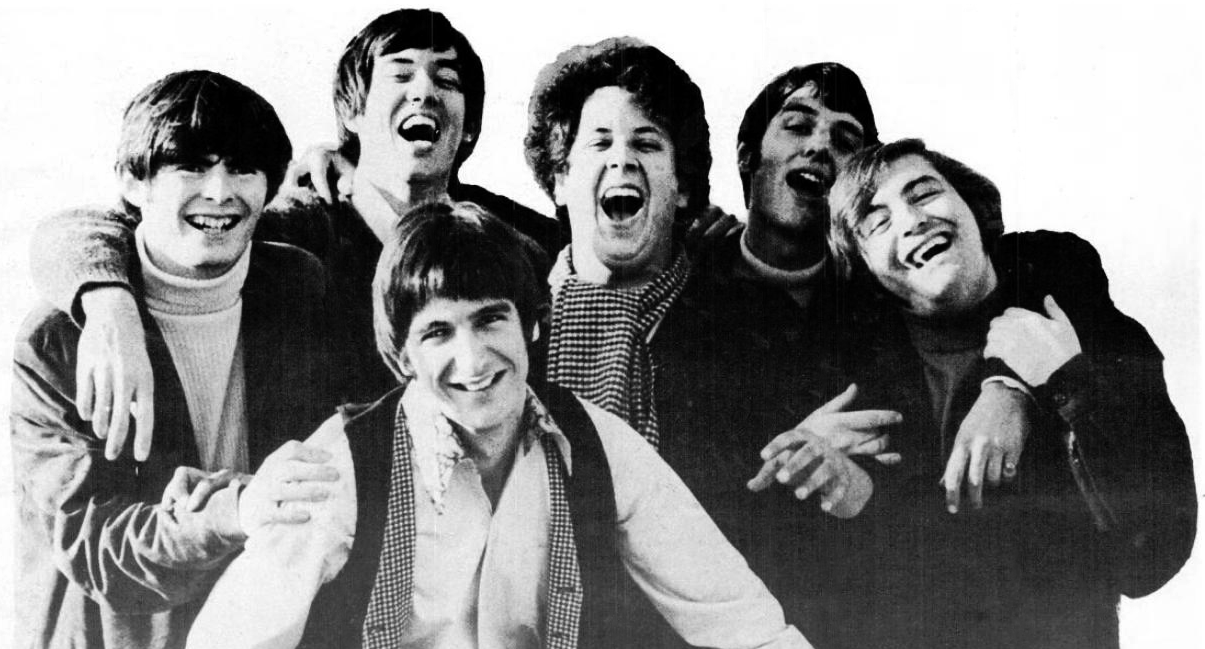
- The Turtles in 1967 (left to right): Al Nichol, Chip Douglas, John Barbata, Mark Volman, Jim Tucker, Howard Kaylan.
- Studio albums: 5
- Extended plays: 7
- Compilation albums: 20
- Singles: 26

The Turtles are an American rock band formed in Los Angeles, California in 1965, whose original lineup consisted of Howard Kaylan, Mark Volman, Al Nichol, Chuck Portz, Jim Tucker and Don Murray. Originating from an earlier surf band called the Crossfires, the Turtles first achieved success with a sound that fused folk music with rock and roll, but would achieve greater success with pop music, scoring their biggest and best-known hit in 1967 with the song "Happy Together". They charted several other top 40 hits, including "It Ain't Me Babe" (1965), "You Baby" (1966), "She'd Rather Be With Me" (1967), "Elenore" (1968) and "You Showed Me" (1969). Worldwide, The Turtles released 5 studio albums, 20 compilation albums, 7 extended plays and 26 singles.

1967's Golden Hits is notable for featuring remixes of "It Ain't Me Babe", "Let Me Be" and "You Baby". These are the only remixes done on early album tracks as the multi-tracks went missing shortly thereafter. These three remixes are almost always used on compilations, instead of the original wide stereo mixes. The 1970 album More Golden Hits contains stereo mixes of "Sound Asleep", "She's My Girl", and "Who Would Ever Think That I Would Marry Margaret?". The first two were briefly available on CD reissues in the mid-'90s, while the latter remained unique to More Golden Hits until its inclusion on All the Singles.

Wooden Head was a compilation album composed of unissued recordings, circa 1966. The Chalon Road compilation gathered together many unissued and 45-only tracks. Shell Shock was a compilation of material intended for an album recorded in 1969 that remained unfinished. The Turtles '66 is described by the Flo and Eddie record label as a lost album.

== Albums ==
=== Studio albums ===
Title	Album details	Peak chart positions			
Title	Album details	US Bill.	US Cash.	CAN	UK
It Ain't Me Babe	Released: 1965; Label: White Whale	98	35	—	—
You Baby	Released: 1966; Label: White Whale	—	71	—	—
Happy Together	Released: 1967; Label: White Whale	25	15	12	18
The Turtles Present the Battle of the Bands	Released: 1968; Label: White Whale	128	43	40	—
Turtle Soup	Released: 1969; Label: White Whale	117	105	—	—

=== Compilations ===
Title	Album details	Peak chart positions	
Title	Album details	US Bill.	US Cash.
Golden Hits	Released: 1967; Label: White Whale	7	5
More Golden Hits	Released: 1970; Label: White Whale	146	—
Wooden Head	Released: 1970; Label: White Whale	—	—
Happy Together Again	Released: 1974; Label: Sire	194	156
The Turtles: 1968	Released: 1978; Label: Rhino	—	—
Out of Control (released under the name The Crossfires)	Released: 1981; Label: Rhino	—	—
Turtle-Sized	Released: 1982; Label: Rhino	—	—
Turtles' Greatest Hits	Released: 1982; Label: Rhino	—	—
20 Greatest Hits	Released: 1984; Label: Rhino	—	—
Chalon Road	Released: 1986; Label: Rhino	—	—
Shell Shock	Released: 1986; Label: Rhino	—	—
The Best of the Turtles (Golden Archive Series)	Released: 1987; Label: Rhino	—	—
Turtle Wax: The Best of the Turtles, Vol. 2	Released: 1988; Label: Rhino	—	—
Lil' Bit of Gold	Released: 1988; Label: Rhino	—	—
Lil' Bit of Gold, Volume 2	Released: 1988; Label: Rhino	—	—
The Best of the Turtles	Released: 1995; Label: Rhino	—	—
Solid Zinc: The Turtles Anthology	Released: 2002; Label: Rhino	—	—
Happy Together: The Very Best of the Turtles	Released: 2004; Label: Shout! Factory	—	—
Save the Turtles: The Turtles Greatest Hits	Released: 2009; Label: FloEdCo / Manifesto	—	—
All the Singles	Released: 2016; Label: FloEdCo / Manifesto	—	—
The Complete Original Album Collection	Released: 2016; Label: FloEdCo / Manifesto	—	—
The Turtles '66	Released: 2017; Label: FloEdCo / Manifesto	—	—

== Singles ==
=== US singles ===
Title	Year	Peak chart positions										Album
Title	Year	US Hot	US Cash.	AUS	BEL (Fla.)	BEL (Wal.)	CAN	NL	NZ	GER	UK	Album
"Dr. Jekyll & Mr. Hyde" (released under the name The Crossfires)	1963	—	—	—	—	—	—	—	—	—	—	Out of Control
"It Ain't Me Babe"	1965	8	8	38	—	—	3	—	—	—	—	It Ain't Me, Babe
"Let Me Be"	1965	29	26	54	—	—	14	—	18	—	—	It Ain't Me, Babe
"You Baby"	1966	20	17	—	—	—	11	—	—	—	—	You, Baby
"Grim Reaper of Love"	1966	81	95	—	—	—	61	—	—	—	—	Non-album singles (first album release on Golden Hits)
"Outside Chance"	1966	—	—	—	—	—	—	—	—	—	—	Non-album singles (first album release on Golden Hits)
"Can I Get to Know You Better?"	1966	89	97	—	—	—	—	—	19	—	—	Non-album singles (first album release on Golden Hits)
"Happy Together"	1967	1	1	18	8	5	2	6	2	11	12	Happy Together
"She'd Rather Be with Me"	1967	3	2	16	13	18	1	15	8	23	4	Happy Together
"Guide for the Married Man"	1967	—	—	—	—	—	—	—	—	—	—	Happy Together
"You Know What I Mean"	1967	12	12	86	—	—	6	—	19	40	—	Golden Hits
"She's My Girl"	1967	14	15	—	—	—	5	—	—	—	—	Non-album singles (first album release on More Golden Hits)
"Sound Asleep"	1968	57	32	—	—	—	23	—	—	—	—	Non-album singles (first album release on More Golden Hits)
"The Story of Rock and Roll"	1968	48	37	—	—	—	29	—	—	—	—	Non-album singles (first album release on More Golden Hits)
"Elenore"	1968	6	5	8	20	18	4	—	1	32	7	The Turtles Present the Battle of the Bands
"You Showed Me"	1969	6	4	—	—	—	1	—	19	—	—	The Turtles Present the Battle of the Bands
"House on the Hill"	1969	—	—	—	—	—	—	—	—	—	—	Turtle Soup
"You Don't Have to Walk in the Rain"	1969	51	52	—	—	—	40	—	—	—	—	Turtle Soup
"Love in the City"	1969	91	61	—	—	—	46	—	—	—	—	Turtle Soup
"Lady-O"	1969	78	67	—	—	—	59	—	—	—	—	Non-album single (first album release on More Golden Hits)
"Teardrops" (released under the name The Dedications)	1970	—	—	—	—	—	—	—	—	—	—	Non-album single
"Who Would Ever Think That I Would Marry Margaret?"	1970	—	—	90	—	—	—	—	—	—	—	More Golden Hits
"Is It Any Wonder?"	1970	—	—	—	—	—	—	—	—	—	—	Golden Hits
"Eve of Destruction"	1970	100	105	—	—	—	—	—	—	—	—	It Ain't Me, Babe
"Me About You"	1970	105	—	—	—	—	—	—	—	—	—	Happy Together

== Other charted songs ==
Title	Year	Peak chart positions	Album
Title	Year	CAN	Album
"It Was a Very Good Year"	1965	7	It Ain't Me Babe
