= Golden Hits (Turtles album) =

Greatest hits album by The Turtles
- Released: October 1967
- Recorded: 1965–1967
- Label: White Whale
- Producers: Bones Howe; Joe Wissert

The Turtles chronology
Golden Hits (1967)	More Golden Hits (1970)

Golden Hits is the first compilation album by the American rock band the Turtles. It was released on White Whale Records.

== Track listing ==
Side 1

1. "You Baby" (P.F. Sloan, Steve Barri) – 2:19 (from You Baby)
2. "So Goes Love" (Gerry Goffin, Carole King) – 2:37 (new track)
3. "She'd Rather Be with Me" (Gary Bonner, Alan Gordon) – 2:17 (from Happy Together)
4. "Is It Any Wonder" (Kaylan) – 2:28 (previously unreleased)
5. "Let Me Be" (Sloan) – 2:20 (from It Ain't Me Babe)
6. "Grim Reaper of Love" (Al Nichol, Chuck Portz) – 2:45 (non-LP single)

Side 2

1. "It Ain't Me Babe" (Bob Dylan) – 2:10 (from It Ain't Me Babe)
2. "Can I Get To Know You Better" (Sloan, Barri) – 2:32 (non-LP single)
3. "Happy Together" (Bonner, Gordon) – 2:50 (from Happy Together)
4. "Outside Chance" (Glenn Crocker, Warren Zevon) – 2:02 (non-LP single)
5. "You Know What I Mean" (Bonner, Gordon) – 2:38 (new track)
