= Don Murray (drummer) =

American drummer (1945–1996)

- Don Murray as part of The Turtles in 1965

Background information
- Born: Donald Ray Murray; November 8, 1945; Glendale, California, U.S.
- Died: March 22, 1996 (aged 50) Santa Monica, California, U.S
- Genres: Folk rock, pop
- Occupation: Drummer
- Instrument: Drums
- Years active: 1965-1968; 1981-1983
- Label: White Whale
- Formerly of: The Turtles (1965-1966); The Holy Mackerel (1968); The Surfaris (1981-1983)

Donald Ray Murray (November 8, 1945 – March 22, 1996) was an American drummer and Hanna-Barbera animator, best known for his work with the Turtles. After leaving the group, Murray played with Paul Williams's psychedelic folk group the Holy Mackerel. In the 1980s he went on to perform with the newly formed Surfaris.

== Early life ==
Murray grew up in Inglewood, California and started playing drums at the age of 15. He became popular playing high school dances with the band the Crossfires.

== Career ==
=== The Turtles ===
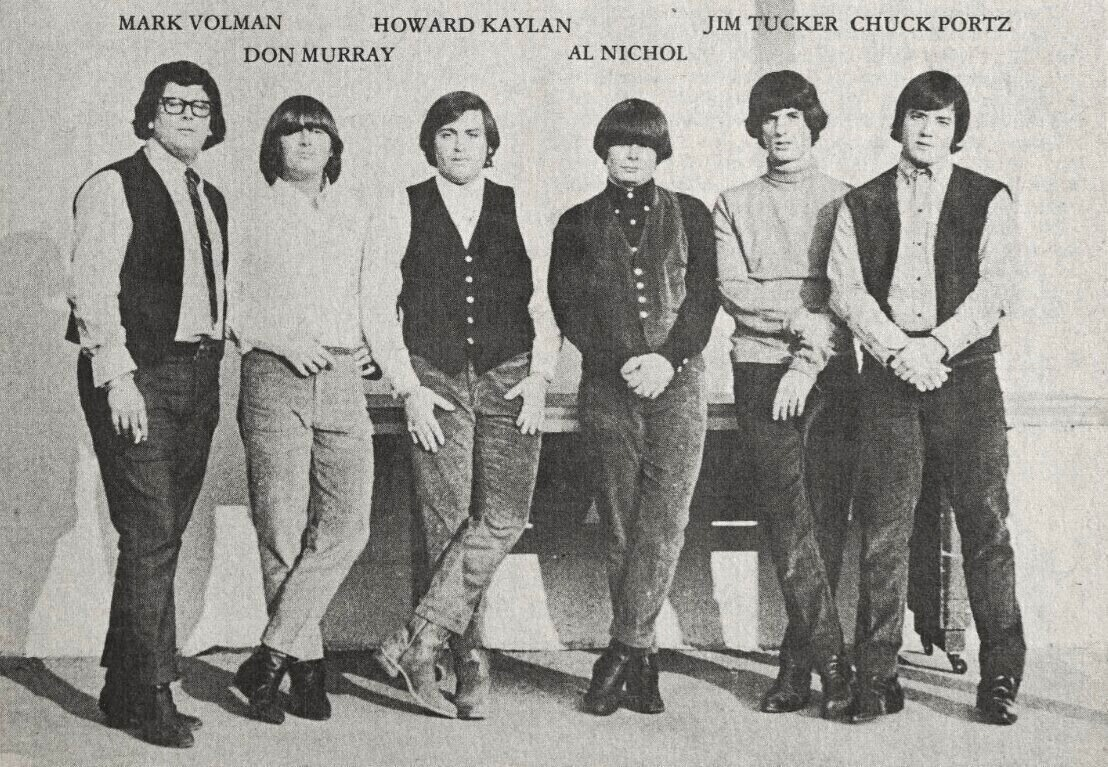
Don Murray (second from left) as part of The Turtles in 1965

The Crossfires released one album, Out Of Control, in 1963. By 1965, the Crossfires became the Turtles, but the band had troubles playing at most Southern California venues such as the Whisky a Go Go and the Troubadour, because all members of the band were under 21.

As the band went from high school band "Don Murray And The Crossfires" to "The Turtles", they signed to White Whale Records in 1965. As a member of the Turtles, he played on their debut and second album; It Ain't Me Babe (1965) and You Baby (1966). After appearances on Shindig!, Where the Action Is, and Hullabaloo, as well as a cameo in the 1966 film Out of Sight, Turtles frontman Howard Kaylan and the other band members tossed Murray out of The Turtles after their first gig in New York City, saying "Don thought it was still his high school band".

Murray was interviewed along with former Turtle members Howard Kaylan, Mark Volman, Jim Tucker, Chuck Portz, Jim Pons, and Johnny Barbata in the 1991 documentary “The Turtles: Happy Together”.

=== The Holy Mackerel ===
In 1968, Paul Williams, who was still a struggling musician trying to make it big in the music industry, recruited Murray to join his Psychedelic folk group The Holy Mackerel. In March 1968, the Holy Mackerel began work on their self-titled album at Sunset Sound Studios in Los Angeles.

During process on the album, Murray left to continue performing independently, and was replaced by Dewey Martin, previously of Buffalo Springfield.

=== The Sufaris ===
In 1981, Murray was a member of the reformed version of the surf rock group The Surfaris. His only credit with the band is a 1983 live album.

== Later life ==
In the 1970s Murray was an art director for Skateboarder magazine, and also for Hot Rod magazine. By the 1980s, he was working as an animator for Hanna-Barbera.

== Death ==
Murray was admitted to a hospital in January 1996 for ulcer surgery, and died two months later in Santa Monica, California on March 22 from complications of the surgery aged 50.

== Discography ==
=== The Turtles ===
==== Studio albums ====
Year	Album	Label
1965	It Ain't Me Babe	White Whale
1966	You Baby	White Whale

==== Singles ====
Year	Title (A-side / B-side) Both sides from same album except where indicated	Album	Label
1965	"It Ain't Me Babe" / "Almost There" (from You, Baby)	It Ain't Me, Babe	White Whale
1965	"Let Me Be" / "Your Maw Said You Cried (In Your Sleep Last Night)"	It Ain't Me, Babe	White Whale
1966	"You Baby" / "Wanderin' Kind" (from It Ain't Me, Babe)	You, Baby	White Whale
1966	"It Was a Very Good Year" / "Let the Cold Winds Blow"	It Ain't Me, Babe	White Whale
1966	"Grim Reaper of Love" / "Come Back" (from Wooden Head)	Golden Hits	White Whale
1966	"We'll Meet Again" / "Outside Chance" (from Golden Hits)	Wooden Head	White Whale
1966	"Making My Mind Up" / "Outside Chance" (from Golden Hits)	Happy Together	White Whale
1966	"Can I Get to Know You Better?" / "Like the Seasons" (from Happy Together)	Golden Hits	White Whale

=== The Holy Mackerel ===
==== Albums ====
Title	Year
The Holy Mackerel	1968

=== The Surfaris ===
==== Albums ====
Title	Year
Surf Party! The Best of The Surfaris Live!	1983
