= Grim Reaper of Love =

- Cover of the 1966 US single

Single by the Turtles
- B-side: "Come Back"
- Released: May 28, 1966
- Recorded: April 12–13 & 16, 1966
- Studio: Western Recorders, Hollywood
- Genre: Psychedelic rock; raga rock; jazz fusion
- Length: 2:20
- Label: White Whale
- Songwriters: Chuck Portz; Al Nichol
- Producer: Bones Howe

The Turtles singles chronology
"You Baby" (1966)	"Grim Reaper of Love" (1966)	"Outside Chance" (1966)

Audio
- "Grim Reaper of Love" on YouTube

"Grim Reaper of Love" is a single by the American rock band the Turtles, written by their lead guitarist Al Nichol and bassist Chuck Portz. The song was conceived by the band members after dismay that their previous US Billboard Hot 100 entries had been composed by outside singer-songwriters. It was written at night following one of the band's gigs in Oregon and finished by the following morning. Producer Bones Howe recorded the song together with the Turtles at Western Recorders in Hollywood, Los Angeles during sporadic sessions in April 1966. It is a psychedelic raga rock song owing to the band's newfound will to experiment. The use of drummer Don Murray's quintuple meter (5/4) drum beat was very unusual for rock and roll at the time, causing the song to be considered an early adapter of jazz fusion. The song features an early usage of the electric sitar on a pop record.

White Whale Records released "Grim Reaper of Love" as the Turtles' fourth single on May 28, 1966, backed by "Come Back". The release was unexpected for the band, as it hadn't been recorded specifically for single release. The song peaked at number 81 on the Billboard Hot 100, becoming a chart failure which broke the Turtles' run of three consecutive top-30 singles. Upon release, the single received positive reviews in the American press, who noted the drumming and raga rock style. Retrospectively, it has been praised and been considered a contender for the Turtles' best single. The band's retrospective opinion of the song was mixed.

== Background ==
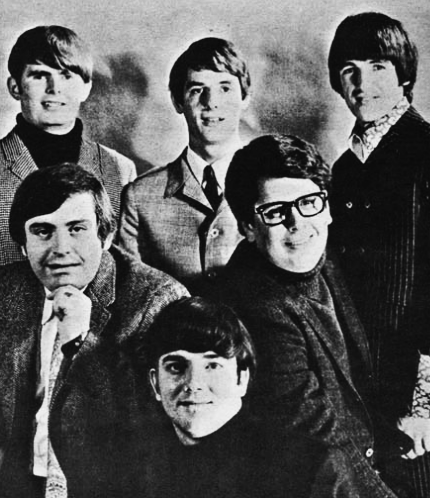
"Grim Reaper of Love" was co-written by the Turtles' lead guitarist Al Nichol (top-left) and bassist Chuck Portz (bottom).

Between mid-1965 and early 1966, American pop band the Turtles had released three folk rock singles that reached the US Billboard Hot 100's top-30; "It Ain't Me, Babe", "Let Me Be" (both 1965), and "You Baby" (1966), of which "It Ain't Me Babe" had reached the top-10. According to band lead vocalist Howard Kaylan, the success of these singles "legitimized the Turtles" as they had become a "three-hit wonder" which had given them credibility, headlining shows together with acts such as the Yardbirds, the Animals, and the Lovin' Spoonful. However, with exceptions of a few B-sides, none of the three singles had been written by any of the group's six members; "It Ain't Me, Babe" had been written by Bob Dylan, and both "Let Me Be" and "You Baby" were composed by P. F Sloan. This, according to Kaylan, posed a problem as they wanted to "badly be the Beatles".

At the time, the Turtles were signed to the independent record label White Whale Records, ran by Ted Feigin and Lee Lasseff who also owned the band's publishing rights, and, despite doubts over the band's' writing abilities, encouraged them to write original material. This initially manifested itself in the release of the Turtles' second studio album You Baby (1966), which saw an increase in group compositions, with half of the album's content being self-composed. Although Kaylan was their primary composer, almost all band members contributed to the material in some capacity, including guitarists Al Nichol and Jim Tucker, and bassist Chuck Portz who would go on to write "Grim Reaper of Love".

== Composition and recording ==
"Grim Reaper of Love" was written collectively by Nichol and Portz at night following a band gig in Oregon. According to Nichol, the lyrics were primarily written by Portz, who had been "writing a story poem" that was a "little bit on the dark side". Coincidentally, Nichol was experimenting, playing with a newly purchased electric sitar when the duo realized they wanted to come up with something "really off the wall", and "by the next day we more or less had the song written" after finding a proper modal tuning. According to Harold Bronson, "Grim Reaper of Love" was written as an "exercise of the group's new-found interest in psychedelia". Kaylan states that it was written with the Beatles' in mind.

Structurally, "Grim Reaper of Love" was written in the key of D major and has a BPM of 98. It is notable for drummer Don Murray's quintuple meter (5/4) drum beat which prevails throughout the verses, which Nichol wrote as an experiment, since "something in a 5/4 time hadn't really been done in rock'n'roll". According to musicologist Walter Everett, the song's "lowered melodic inflection in the minor mode" was chosen to "illustrate the grim". The song's sound clearly draws inspirations from Eastern Music, being a "droning, Indian-styled paean to pessimism". Other music critics note the song's clear raga rock style, with Bronson stating that it was a "drone infested with an aura of doom". Bob Stanley stated that the song had an "extended tuneless raga break" that was moody. Writer Michael Uslan instead classifies "Grim Reaper of Love" as a "morbid psychedelic rock raga". Richie Unterberger believes the track to be "psychedelically-tinged". The song's relatively unique time signature has led it to have been classified as an early example of jazz fusion.

"Al [Nichol] and Chuck [Portz], cashing in on the Beatles' new interest in Indian music, had written an Eastern-sounding jazz raga in 5/4 time called "Grim Reaper of Love". It wasn't commercial. It wasn't melodic. Shit, it was barely a song."

— Howard Kaylan, Shell Shocked: My Life with the Turtles, Flo and Eddie, and Frank Zappa, etc.

In the spring of 1966, the Turtles recorded an album's worth of material together with producer Bones Howe to give White Whale Records a backlog of recordings to pick and choose from. "Grim Reaper of Love" was recorded during these sessions at United Western Recorders in Hollywood, Los Angeles. Work on the song commenced on April 12, 1966, during a nightly session which spanned until April 13. The song's recording was finalized during a later session, on April 16. As with most of their early recording sessions, "Grim Reaper of Love" was produced by Howe. Unlike many other artists in Los Angeles at the time, the Turtles were never substituted by the Wrecking Crew on their recordings due to White Whale Records' lower budget. As a result, all of the Turtles' members perform on the song, including Nichol, who in addition to his lead guitar duties also plays an electric sitar designed by Vinnie Bell. During the mixing for the song's single release, it was decided to cut roughly 20 seconds from the song's instrumental break, bringing the runtime down from 2:42 minutes down to 2:20 minutes. As such, a spoken-word section by Murray saying "close your eyes when you clap" was removed.

== Release and commercial performance ==
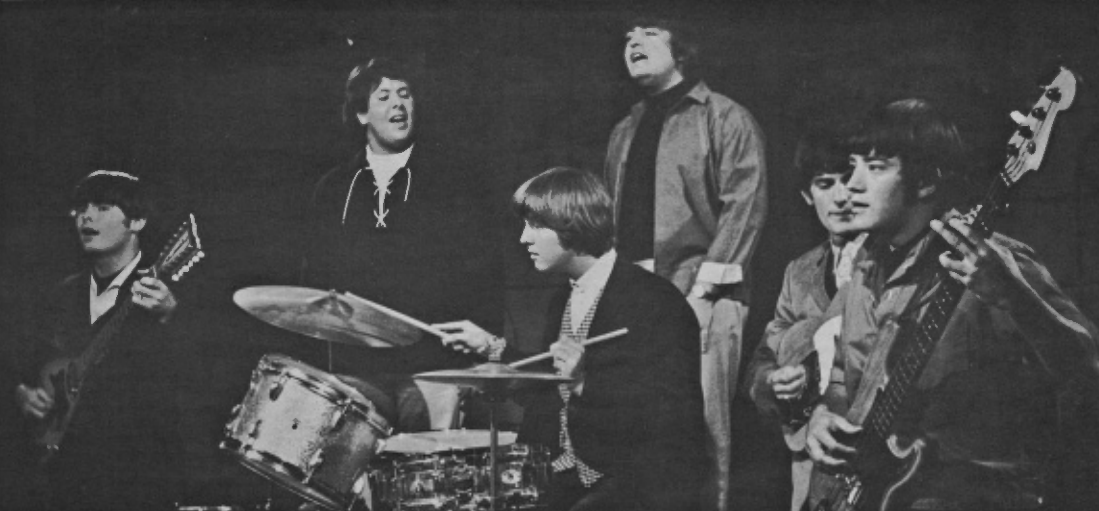
The Turtles promoting "Grim Reaper of Love".

"Grim Reaper of Love" was never written for a single release, and thus, the release of it was unsanctioned by the Turtles. Kaylan particularly wrote that the momentum the band had built-up was abandoned by the release of "Grim Reaper of Love" because "White Whale [Records] couldn't find a follow-up" and that it was released solely because Feign and Lasseff owned the Turtles' publishing, "were greedy and had nothing else". Nichol stated that he never "expected it to be a single". Nonetheless, "Grim Reaper of Love" was released as the Turtles fourth single through White Whale Records on May 28, 1966. (Note: Catalogue number WW-231.) The single's B-side was "Come Back", which was written by Kaylan and selected from the You Baby album. According to writer Ken Barnes, the release of "Grim Reaper of Love" as an A-side was "one of the most courageous or career-breaking" decisions committed by a band during the 1960s. Stanley called it "the least commercial-sounding single" of 1966.

""Grim Reaper of Love"" was going to be a sort of break because none of us wanted to get stereotyped with the AM bubblegum rock'n'roll groups. Musically we knew we were capable of doing a lot more."

— Al Nichol, Solid Zinc: The Turtles Anthology.

Commercially, "Grim Reaper of Love" entered the Billboard Hot 100 chart on June 18, 1966 at a position of 96, before peaking at 81 on June 25. In total, the single spent four weeks on the Billboard chart. On the other major US trade publications, it also peaked at number 95 on the Cash Box Top 100 and 83 on the Record World 100 Top Pops charts. "Grim Reaper of Love" fared the best in Canada, where it peaked at number 61 on the country's RPM Top 100 chart on July 18, 1966. However, as all three previous singles by the Turtles had reached the top-30 in the Billboard charts, "Grim Reaper of Love" was a considerable chart failure" to avoid repetition for the group, and didn't sell as well as their previous singles had. Andrew Sandoval suggests that record buyers were "ill-prepared" for the single's release, whereas Nichol theorized that it was "weird enough" for White Whale to think it had a chance to chart. Stanley stated that the song's uncommerciality was "a fine piece of career suicide". According to Kaylan, the fact that "Grim Reaper of Love" charted was a "testament to something" but that he wasn't sure what.

Although the single was released during roughly the same time as their second studio album You Baby, "Grim Reaper of Love" was not included on it. Likewise, it was also excluded from the Turtles' third studio album Happy Together in April 1967. "Grim Reaper of Love" would receive its first album release in October 1967, when it was included on the Turtles' first compilation album Golden Hits. On that album, it appeared in stereo sound for the first time, and was presented in the unedited version with the full instrumental break. More recently, "Grim Reaper of Love" was included on the compilation box set Where the Action Is! Los Angeles Nuggets: 1965–1968 in 2009, in addition to a Rhino Entertainment re-issue of the Turtles' 1970 album Wooden Head.

== Critical reception and legacy ==
Upon release in 1966, the single received sparse yet positive reviews in the American trade publications. Billboard magazine wrote that the single was an "unusual lyric" ballad rouser that had "all the ingredients" of the Turtles' previous hit "You Baby", noting Murray's drum performance by stating that it had a "strong beat backing". In Cash Box magazine, the staff reviewer wrote that "Grim Reaper of Love" is a "funky, hard-driving item" which "underscores the dangers of modern romance".

Retrospectively, "Grim Reaper of Love" has been considered one of the Turtles' best singles, with many critics noting the raga rock influences on the song. Bronson writes that it is an "interesting record" and possibly the "band's best composition at the time", comparing it to the Byrds' more-publicized raga rock single "Eight Miles High", which had been released two months prior. Bob Stanley on the contrary, stated that "Grim Reaper of Love" with the raga jazz influences was "outright one of the weirdest 45s of the 1960s". Critic Mike Segretto highlights "Grim Reaper of Love" and the subsequent follow-up single "Outside Chance" as two of the coolest recordings the Turtles ever put to tape. Unterberger cited the lyrics as "odd and mordant". Andrew Sandoval notes the single's heavyocity, something he believes added to the commercial unappeal of it upon release.

"So they released it [Grim Reaper of Love] and it almost ended our brief career. What was radio supposed to do with that? Not much, it turns out. And for the first time, our newfound success seemed to be slipping away".

— Howard Kaylan (2013)

Band opinion of "Grim Reaper of Love" has been mixed. Kaylan, a notorious critic of the song, stated that it lacked melody and could barely constitute as a song. However, he also stated that the song made "the band proud" because they "did it themselves" and that they "did our best". On the contrary, he and secondary vocalist Mark Volman acknowledged the song's status as "revolutionary", since it altered people's perception of the band. They particularly believed that the single would make radio DJs state that "they wouldn't have to worry about these guys [the Turtles] again". Nichol has retrospectively stated that the Turtles' most likely tried achieving a "shock effect" with the release of "Grim Reaper of Love" to the point that he wanted them to go "hey, these guys are weird!"

Nonetheless, "Grim Reaper of Love" and the adjacent April 1966 recording sessions became the final released songs by the Turtles' original line-up. Shortly after the release of "Grim Reaper of Love", drummer Murray left the band, citing personal domestic stress alongside a creative tension between Kaylan and Nichol, most likely caused by the release of the single. Murray would temporarily be replaced by Joel Larson before John Barbara permanently took his spot. In addition, starting with "Grim Reaper of Love", the Turtles' went through a brief period of commercial decline in popularity during the latter months of 1966, before their fortunes were revived by their sole number 1 single "Happy Together" (1967). In an interview with The Desert Sun, Kaylan stated that the Turtles had to "put out several singles" including "Grim Reaper of Love", all of whom "had had no luck cracking the top 50". He further states if they hadn't recorded "Happy Together", it is likely the band would be without a recording contract at the start of 1967.

== Personnel ==
Personnel according to the credits of Save The Turtles: The Turtles Greatest Hits, unless otherwise noted.

- Howard Kaylan – lead vocals
- Mark Volman – vocals
- Al Nichol – electric sitar, lead guitar, vocals
- Jim Tucker – rhythm guitar
- Chuck Portz – bass guitar
- Don Murray – drums, spoken word

== Charts ==
Weekly chart performance for "Grim Reaper of Love"
Chart (1966)	Peak position
Canada (RPM 100)	61
US Billboard Hot 100	81
US Cashbox Top 100	95
US Record World 100 Top Pops	83
