= Outside Chance (song) =

Single by the Turtles
- A-side: "Making My Mind Up" (Second pressing)
- B-side: "We'll Meet Again" (Original release)
- Released: July 1966
- Recorded: c. June 2, 1966
- Studio: Western Recorders, Hollywood
- Genre: Folk rock; Garage rock; jangle pop; pop
- Length: 2:02
- Label: White Whale
- Composer: Warren Zevon
- Lyricist: Glenn Crocker
- Producer: Bones Howe

The Turtles singles chronology
"Grim Reaper of Love" (1966)	"Outside Chance" (1966)	"Can I Get to Know You Better" (1966)

Audio
- "Outside Chance" on YouTube

"Outside Chance" is a song written by lyricist Glenn Crocker and composer Warren Zevon, initially recorded by American pop band the Turtles in 1966. Zevon and the Turtles were label-mates on White Whale Records, being introduced to one another by label founders Ted Feigin and Lee Lasseff after a meeting where Zevon's music was played for the Turtles. "Outside Chance" was inspired by the Beatles "Paperback Writer" and features a prominent twelve-string jangle guitar riff. The Turtles recorded the song at Western Recorders in June 1966 together with producer Bones Howe and session musician Larry Knechtel.

White Whale released "Outside Chance" as the Turtles' fifth single release in July 1966 with "We'll Meet Again" as the B-side. As the song was issued in a period where the band were commercially unsuccessful, "Outside Chance" failed to chart on the US Billboard Hot 100. White Whale withdrew the single and placed the song on the B-side of "Making My Mind Up" in September 1966, a release which also failed to chart. "Outside Chance" received primarily positive reviews, noting the upbeat rock sound. Retrospectively, the single gave Zevon credibility in the music industry and was critically acclaimed, being considered one of the Turtles' best recordings.

== Background ==
"Outside Chance" was one of the first songs Warren Zevon wrote that were recorded

In May 1966, the Turtles released their fourth single "Grim Reaper of Love" through White Whale Records. (Note: Catalogue number WW-231.) The song, a raga rock composition, written by band members Al Nichol and Chuck Portz, was a commercial failure, only reaching number 81 on the US Billboard Hot 100. This resulted in the band becoming "adrift commercially". Additionally, the Turtles original drummer Don Murray left the band in May 1966 during a recording session at Western Recorders in Hollywood, Los Angeles, citing musical pressures and frictions between band members as the reason. After playing with temporary replacement drummer Joel Larson for a few weeks, before more permanently settling on John Barbata after a suggestion from the Byrds Gene Clark.

In 1965, a teenage Warren Zevon and his friend Violet Santangelo formed a duo titled Lyme & Cybelle. His pseudonym Lyme was taken from a cologne named Old Lyme. White Whale Records expressed interest in the duo and Zevon's songwriting, and assigned them producer Bones Howe, with whom the duo recorded their debut single "Follow Me" in 1966. It became a moderate success, reaching number 65 on the Billboard Hot 100. Initially, their career was promising, with White Whale Records "deciding it was worth to make more records". However, after the follow-up single, a cover of Bob Dylan's "If You Gotta Go, Go Now" failed to chart, the professional relationship between Zevon and Santangelo faltered. Zevon, who wrote "Follow Me" and was signed to the White Whale publishing company, instead focused on his songwriting, recording demos together with Howe. (Note: Zevon's demo of "Outside Chance" was released on the 2003 compilation album The First Sessions.)

Zevon and the Turtles were introduced to one another through White Whale Records founders Ted Feigin and Lee Lasseff, who played Lyme & Cybelle's "Follow Me" for the band during a meeting. According to the Turtles lead vocalist Howard Kaylan, the band "were impressed" by the record, with Kaylan adding that Zevon sounded like "an incredible songwriter" and that "he seemed like the nicest guy" after meeting him at a later date. The official collaboration between the band and Zevon began in January 1966, when they recorded his composition "Like The Seasons" at Western Recorders, which would end up as the B-sides of both "Can I Get to Know You Better" in October 1966, (Note: Catalogue number WW-238.) and "Happy Together" in January 1967. (Note: Catalogue number WW-244.)

== Composition and recording ==
"Outside Chance" was composed by Zevon and the piano player from his former band Glenn Crocker, whom he had met in 1962. Crocker stated that he wrote the song's lyrics, whilst Zevon composed the music. Writer Harold Bronson suggests the composition was inspired by the Beatles' "Paperback Writer" (1966). The song was part of the demos Zevon recorded for Howe, who suggested it would suit the Turtles' musical style. According to Howe, "Outside Chance" had the same "stomping" beat during every quarter note during the chorus that was also present on the Turtles' debut single "It Ain't Me Babe" (1965), (Note: Catalogue number WW-222.) which added to "Outside Chance"'s commercial appeal. According to Kaylan, when Zevon presented him with "Outside Chance", Kaylan saw it as an opportunity to prove that "we [the Turtles] weren't just these soft, folk rock guys". He additionally added that the band recorded it because both they and Zevon needed commercial success.

The opening of "Outside Chance"
Several critics contend that "Outside Chance" was influenced by songs by the Beatles, in particular "Taxman" (1966)

Structurally, "Outside Chance" was written in the key of A major and has a BPM of 134. Musicologist Bob Stanley writes that "Outside Chance" was "tough garage punk rock" that contrasted greatly from their previous singles, whereas Elizabeth Klisiewicz of The Big Takeover calls the song an early example of jangle pop. Several critics have noted the influence of the Beatles; Ken Barnes writes that the single could be considered a missing link between the Beatles' "Ticket to Ride" and Paul Revere & the Raiders. Zevon historian Peter Gallagher notes that the song is a "splice" between "Day Tripper" and "Ticket To Ride". Andrew Sandoval noted that the single featured a "Day Tripper"-esque riff", as did Kaylan, who stated that he saw "Outside Chance" as the Turtles' response to "Day Tripper and Paperback Writer". AllMusic's Richard Gilliam stated that the lyrics were ironic, with the composition combining the music of "the folk rock era" onto a pop song. The song is largely based on a riff performed on a 12-string electric guitar, which Bill Kopp of Goldmine suggests was influenced by George Harrison's "Taxman".

"I always liked that one ["Outside Chance"]. I thought it could have been a hit. It didn't have anything that just jumped out and grabbed you. It was just a good rock'n'n roll song from beginning to end."

— Al Nichol, All The Singles.

"Outside Chance" was most likely recorded on June 2, 1966, at the Western Recorders Studios in Hollywood, Los Angeles, where the Turtles were booked for a 3:30 PM session after the Beach Boys who had wrapped up recording of "Good Vibrations". According to lead guitarist Al Nichol, the session occurred the day after Barbata had joined the band. According to Turtles second vocalist Mark Volman, Barbata had a special way of drumming which contributed to the "driving beat" on "Outside Chance". The song features an appearance of session musician Larry Knechtel, who stayed behind after the Beach Boys session, and contributes a keyboard solo and piano to "Outside Chance". As with all recordings by the Turtles during this era, the song was produced by Bones Howe, who also engineered the track together with Armin Steiner.

== Release and reception ==
Following the chart failure of "Grim Reaper of Love", White Whale rush-released "Outside Chance" as the Turtles' fifth single release in July 1966. (Note: Catalogue number WW-234.) On original release, the B-side was a cover of "We'll Meet Again", popularized by Vera Lynn and featured as the closing song in the Turtles' live repertoire. Although the single was "a return to form" for the band and more "conventional" compared to "Grim Reaper of Love", it became an even bigger chart failure than the previous single, failing to chart on the Billboard Hot 100 altogether, something that demotivated the band. The chart failure of "Outside Chance" caused White Whale to "freak out", after which they withdrew the single, relegating "Outside Chance" to the B-side and re-releasing it with "Making My Mind Up" on the A-side in September 1966. (Note: Catalogue number WW-237.) Although this re-issue wound up becoming a regional hit in Seattle, it once more failed to chart nationwide in the US.

Promotional copies of "Outside Chance" exclusively credited Zevon (under his pseudonym Lyme), much to Crocker's surprise. According to Crocker, Zevon "wrote his name out" of the contract, even though he got royalties from the single. Just like "Grim Reaper of Love", "Outside Chance" was originally issued as a non-album single, and was also excluded from the Turtles' forthcoming third studio album Happy Together in April 1967. "Outside Chance" would receive its first album release in October 1967, when it was included on the Turtles' first compilation album Golden Hits, despite the fact it failed to chart. More recently, "Outside Chance" was included on the re-issue compilation box set Nuggets: Original Artyfacts from the First Psychedelic Era, 1965–1968 in 1998, in addition to a Rhino Entertainment re-issue of the Turtles' 1970 album Wooden Head.

""Outside Chance" was one of the Turtles' last releases in their angry young folk-rocker incarnation; soon afterward they elevated themselves to new pop, megahit status with smashes such as "Happy Together" and "Elenore".

— Alec Palao (1998)

Upon original release in 1966, "Outside Chance" received sparse though positive reviews in the American music press. In the review for Billboard magazine, the staff reviewer favoritively called both "Outside Chance" and "We'll Meet Again" two "chart-topping tunes", noting that the former is a "teen-aimed rock ballad". Record World stated that the single would cause the Turtle to chart at a "rabbit's pace", noting it to be "upbeat" and "sunny". In Cash Box magazine, the song was described as a "slick, pulsing rocker".

Retrospectively, music historian Alec Palao wrote that the Turtles never "sounded as snotty" as they did on "Outside Chance", noting the song's guitar riff and the "bittersweet" vocal harmonies. Bronson noted that the song was interesting", Klisiewicz wrote that it was "nice", and featured a "frantic" keyboard solo according to writer Ken Barnes. Critic Mike Segretto highlighted "Outside Chance" and the previous single "Grim Reaper of Love" as two of the coolest recordings the Turtles ever put to tape, whilst Barnes believed "Outside Chance" should have become a big hit single, something that failed as the audiences "didn't want to hear the Turtles rock that hard". Palao argued that "Outside Chance" changed the perception of the Turtles and acted as a bridge between their early recordings and later hits. Lead guitarist Nichol has held the single in favorable opinion, and in 2009, vocalist Kaylan stated that "Outside Chance" was his favorite Turtles recording of all time. Additionally, the release of "Outside Chance" gave songwriter Zevon some credibility on the music scene, with Crocker noting that he "bought all of his friends dinner" with the first royalty check he received for the song after "not eating for a week". Despite this, due to the commercial failure of the single, White Whale once more turned to prominent songwriter P. F. Sloan for the Turtles' follow-up single "Can I Get to Know You Better" (1966), which returned the band to a "poppier", "You Baby"-esque sound.

== Personnel ==
Personnel according to the credits of the 1998 re-issue of Nuggets: Original Artyfacts from the First Psychedelic Era, 1965–1968, unless otherwise noted.

The Turtles

- Howard Kaylan – lead vocals
- Mark Volman – vocals
- Al Nichol – lead 12-string guitar
- Jim Tucker – guitar
- Chuck Portz – bass guitar
- John Barbata – drums

Other personnel

- Bones Howe – producer, engineer
- Armin Steiner – engineer
- Larry Knechtel – keyboards, piano
