= Wooden Head =

Compilation album by The Turtles
- Released: September 1970
- Recorded: October 1965–June 1966
- Genre: Folk rock; pop
- Length: 49:31 (Including bonus)
- Label: White Whale
- Producer: Bones Howe, Howard Kaylan, Mark Volman

The Turtles chronology
More Golden Hits (1969)	Wooden Head (1970)

Wooden Head is a compilation album by the American rock band the Turtles, consisting of B-sides and previously unreleased songs mostly recorded in the group's early years and in some cases left unfinished.

== Background ==
Wooden Head was first released in 1970 on White Whale Records. It was re-released on vinyl by Rhino Records, which took the opportunity to change the track listing to avoid duplicates in 1984 (RNLP 154). The album was again reissued as a compact disc in 1993 by Repertoire Records, and included seven bonus tracks.

Professional ratings
Review scores
Source	Rating
Allmusic	3/5 stars

== Track listing ==
1. "I Can't Stop" (Dennis Lambert) – 2:04
2. "She'll Come Back" (Howard Kaylan) – 2:38
3. "Get Away" (Portz, Portz) – 2:10
4. "Wrong from the Start" (Gordon Waller, Peter Asher) – 2:15
5. "I Get Out of Breath" (P.F. Sloan, Steve Barri) – 3:12
6. "We'll Meet Again" (Hughie Charles, Ross Parker) – 2:20
7. "On a Summer's Day" (Al Nichol) – 3:34
8. "Come Back" (Howard Kaylan) – 2:22
9. "Say Girl" (Nichol, Portz, Portz) – 2:06
10. "Tie Me Down" (David Gates) – 2:03
11. "Wanderin' Kind" (Howard Kaylan) – 2:06

=== 1993 CD bonus tracks ===
1. "Ain't Gonna Party No More" – 4:55 (recorded 1969)
2. "Who Would Ever Think That I Would Marry Margaret" – 2:04 (recorded 1969)
3. "Is It Any Wonder" – 2:32 (recorded 1966)
4. "There You Sit Lonely" – 3:44 (recorded late 1969)
5. "Cat in the Window" – 1:39 (recorded 1967)
6. "Like It or Not" – 3:43 (recorded 1969)
7. "You Want to Be a Woman" – 3:26 (recorded 1969)

== Rhino LP release track listing ==
=== Side one ===
1. "I Can't Stop" - 2:06
2. "Grim Reaper of Love" - 2:41
3. "She'll Come Back" - 2:38
4. "Is It Any Wonder" - 2:28
5. "On a Summer's Day" - 3:37
6. "Come Back" - 2:24

=== Side two ===
1. "Get Away" - 2:10
2. "I Get Out of Breath" - 3:15
3. "Tie Me Down" - 2:03
4. "Wrong from the Start" - 2:15
5. "Say Girl" - 2:06
6. "We'll Meet Again" - 2:20
