= She's My Girl =

Single by The Turtles
- B-side: "Chicken Little Was Right"
- Released: October 1967
- Genre: Psychedelic
- Length: 2:37
- Label: White Whale
- Songwriters: Alan Gordon; Garry Bonner
- Producer: Joe Wissert

The Turtles singles chronology
| "You Know What I Mean" (1967) | "She's My Girl" (1967) | "Sound Asleep" (1968) |

"She's My Girl" is a 1967 song and single from the Turtles. It was released on the White Whale record label and reached the top 20 of the Billboard Hot 100 chart during the same year. It was later released as a bonus track on the album, Happy Together by Sundazed Music in 1994.

== Writing and themes ==
"She's My Girl" is a psychedelic song written by Alan Gordon and Gary Bonner. The piece is considered to be one of the more experimental pieces from The Turtles. The song begins with theme and lyrics inspired from jazz, moves into a pop music refrain, and later shifts into 3/4 time.

White Whale Records worked with a filming company headed by John Urie, who agreed to produce a 16mm film for the song featuring the band. Filming lasted three days.

== Reception ==
At the time of its release in 1967, some radio stations objected to themes expressed in the song and banned the song from their playlists and refused to play it; lead singer Howard Kaylan surmised this was because of the song's references to morning glories, a flower with hallucinogenic properties. In spite of this obstacle, the song peaked at #14 on the Billboard Hot 100 and spent ten weeks on the charts. The song reached a national audience in the United States on November 12, 1967 when the Turtles performed the song on the Ed Sullivan Show.

In reviewing the Turtles' legacy in 2016, Steve Horowitz wrote that among a few other hits from the group, the song "still holds up today" and is regularly played on radio stations featuring music from the 1960s and in films depicting the decade. Kaylan has remarked that the piece is one of the band's best songs, but less appreciated. He noted that had the song been released before an earlier hit, "You Know What I Mean", it would have been more publicly successful.

== Credits ==
- Howard Kaylan – lead vocals, keyboards
- Mark Volman – vocals
- Al Nichol – lead guitar, keyboards, backing vocals
- Jim Pons – bass guitar, backing vocals
- John Barbata – drums, percussion
- Alan Gordon – songwriting
- Gary Bonner – songwriting
