= The Holy Mackerel =

American psychedelic pop band

Background information
- Origin: Los Angeles, California, United States
- Genres: Psychedelic pop
- Years active: 1968
- Label: Reprise
- Past members: Paul Williams; Mentor Williams; Bob Harvey; George Hiller; Cynthia Fitzpatrick; Don Murray; Michael Cannon; Jerry Scheff; Dewey Martin

The Holy Mackerel was an American psychedelic pop band formed in Los Angeles, California, in 1968. Created mainly as a studio venture to capitalize on Paul Williams' early success as a songwriter, the group recorded one self-titled studio album in the same year. Development for the album included several bandmates and top session musicians, but audiences were mostly unreceptive to it until The Holy Mackerel was reissued years later.

== History ==
Before the Holy Mackerel, Paul Williams was a struggling singer, songwriter, and actor, who appeared in some low box office films and was one of many people turned down for a role in the Monkees. After an uneventful three months with White Whale Records, Williams began working with Richard Perry. Perry offered Williams an attempt to record a studio album and signed a deal with Reprise Records, compelling Williams to form a band before entering the studio.

Williams recruited his brother, Mentor (rhythm guitar, vocals), ex-Jefferson Airplane member Bob Harvey (bass guitar, vocals), George Hiller (lead guitar, vocals), Cynthia Fitzpatrick (flute, vocals), and former Turtle Don Murray (drums), branding the group as the Holy Mackerel.

On November 22, 1967, Biff Rose, who wrote "Fill Your Heart With Love" with additional lyrics by Williams, introduced Williams to Chuck Kaye of A&M Records, who suggested that he join with Roger Nichols to form a song-writing partnership. In March 1968, the Holy Mackerel began work on their self-titled album at Sunset Sound Studios in Los Angeles, cutting the first two tracks "The Golden Ghost of Love" and an early version of the Nichols-Williams song "To Put Up with You". Williams subsequently re-recorded the latter track on his 1970 solo album Someday Man. Later that same month, the group moved operations to United Studios and added session musicians such as Steve LeFevre.

Recording continued throughout mid-1968, and an album jacket with the Holy Mackerel's original line-up was designed; however, shifts in personnel necessitated a new cover image. Harvey, who wrote the psychedelic, sitar-laden "Wildflowers", left during development and was replaced by future Elvis Presley bassist Jerry Scheff. Soon after, Murray departed to perform in nightclubs; the group called upon Michael Cannon and Dewey Martin of Buffalo Springfield to fill-in at his position. Because of the band's various backgrounds, the album itself promoted a wide-variety of musical tastes including country rock, blues, and psychedelia. In November 1968, The Holy Mackerel was released, but, whether a result of being distributed around the same time as Electric Ladyland or lack of a following for the band, the album failed to chart nationally. Three singles taken from the album also were commercially unsuccessful.

By the time the album was released, the Holy Mackerel had already disbanded a few months beforehand. Williams broke out with a solo and ultimately more successful writing career, penning hit songs for musical acts like Three Dog Night and the Carpenters. The Holy Mackerel was reissued on CD format in 2005 on Collector's Choice Music. A deluxe edition, packaged with ten bonus tracks and extensive liner notes, was later distributed in 2010 by Now Sounds Records.

== Members ==
- Paul Williams – lead vocals
- Mentor Williams – rhythm guitar, vocals
- Bob Harvey – bass guitar, vocals
- George Hiller – lead guitar, vocals
- Cynthia Fitzpatrick – flute, vocals
- Don Murray – drums
- Jerry Scheff – bass guitar
- Michael Cannon – drums
- Dewey Martin – drums
