= Holy Mackerel =

Holy Mackerel may refer to:

- The Holy Mackerel, a 1968 band featuring Paul Williams
- The Holy Mackerel, a 1990s band fronted by Les Claypool
- The Holy Mackerel, a brass fish sculpture in the Massachusetts State House Senate chamber; see Sacred Cod

== See also ==
- "Hey Hey Holy Mackerel", a 1969 Chicago Cubs fight song, written by Johnny Frigo
