= You Baby =

Studio album by the Turtles
- Released: April 1966
- Recorded: October 1965 – January 1966
- Studio: Western Studios
- Genre: Folk rock
- Length: 35:57
- Label: White Whale
- Producer: Bones Howe; Lee Lasseff; Ted Feigin

The Turtles chronology
It Ain't Me Babe (1965)	You Baby (1966)	Happy Together (1967)

Singles from You Baby
- 1. "You Baby" Released: February 1966

Professional ratings
Review scores
Source	Rating
Allmusic	3/5 stars
Tom Hull	B

You Baby is the second studio album by the American rock band the Turtles. It was released in April 1966 on the White Whale Records label. The album was recorded from October 1965 to January 1966 in Western Studios, with the same producers as the band's debut, It Ain't Me Babe (Bones Howe, Lee Lasseff, and Ted Feigin). Only one single was released from the album, that being the title track. The sole single ended up charting at number 20 on the Billboard Hot 100, although the album it came from was the first from the band to not chart on the Billboard 200, although it did peak at number 71 in Cashbox. The album would later be reissued by Sundazed Music, Rhino Records, and Repertoire Records.

== Track listing ==
1. "Flyin' High" (Al Nichol) – 1:47
2. "I Know That You'll Be There" (P.F. Sloan, Steve Barri) – 2:13
3. "House of Pain" (Howard Kaylan) – 2:48
4. "Just a Room" (Steve Duboff, Artie Kornfeld) – 2:30
5. "I Need Someone" (Chuck Portz, Jim Tucker) – 2:23
6. "Let Me Be" (P.F. Sloan) – 2:22
7. "Down in Suburbia" (Bob Lind) – 4:09
8. "Give Love a Trial" (Ronald Schwartz, Matt Portz) – 2:18
9. "You Baby" (P.F. Sloan, Steve Barri) – 2:17
10. "Pall Bearing, Ball Bearing World" (Kaylan) – 2:54
11. "All My Problems" (Lee Lasseff, Ted Feigin) – 3:15
12. "Almost There" (Kaylan) – 2:15

=== Bonus tracks from Sundazed Music CD reissue ===
"Outside Chance" (Glenn Crocker, Warren Zevon) – 2:08
1. "Can I Get to Know You Better" (P.F. Sloan, S. Barri) – 2:38

The LP reissue on Rhino Records contains

1. "You Baby"
2. "Just a Room"
3. "I Know That You'll Be There"
4. "Can I Get to Know You Better"
5. "Give Love a Trial"
6. "Almost There"
7. "Down in Suburbia"
8. "House of Pain"
9. "All My Problems"
10. "Pall Bearing, Ball Bearing World"
11. "Flyin' High"
12. "I Need Someone"

For this reissue, Rhino chose to include the non-album single track "Can I Get to Know You Better" in place of "Let Me Be", which had already appeared on the first Turtles album. This change, of course, necessitated an alteration to the front cover artwork, which on the original 1966 LP prominently showcased the inclusion of "Let Me Be".

The CD reissue on Repertoire Records contains

1. "Flyin' High" (mono) – 1:45
2. "I Know That You'll Be There" (mono) – 2:14
3. "House of Pain" (mono) – 2:47
4. "Just a Room" (mono) – 2:30
5. "I Need Someone" (mono) – 2:19
6. "Let Me Be" (mono) – 2:23
7. "Down in Suburbia" [listed on the sleeve as "Down in Surburbia"] (mono) – 4:06
8. "Give Love a Trial" (mono) – 2:15
9. "You Baby" (mono) – 2:15
10. "Pall Bearing, Ball Bearing World" (mono) – 2:51
11. "All My Problems" (mono) – 3:14
12. "Almost There" (mono) – 2:13
13. "Santa and the Sidewalk Surfer" (Volman, Kaylan, Nichol) (from the album Happy Together Again) – 1:58
14. "Teardrops" (Stanley, Calhoun, Golder) (from the album Happy Together Again) – 3:02
15. "Flyin' High" (stereo) – 1:45
16. "I Know That You'll Be There" (stereo) – 2:14
17. "House of Pain" (stereo) – 2:47
18. "Just a Room" (stereo) – 2:30
19. "I Need Someone" (stereo) – 2:19
20. "Let Me Be" (stereo) – 2:23
21. "Down in Suburbia" [listed on the sleeve as "Down in Surburbia"] (stereo) – 4:06
22. "Give Love a Trial" (stereo) – 2:15
23. "You Baby" (stereo) – 2:15
24. "Pall Bearing, Ball Bearing World" (stereo) – 2:51
25. "All My Problems" (stereo) – 3:14
26. "Almost There" (stereo) – 2:13

== Personnel ==
- Howard Kaylan – keyboards, vocals
- Al Nichol – bass guitar, guitar, keyboards, vocal harmony
- Mark Volman – guitar, tambourine, vocals
- Chuck Portz – bass guitar
- Jim Tucker – rhythm guitar
- Dwight Tunji Trio – percussion, special effects
- Don Murray – drums

== Charts ==
Billboard Hot 100:

- You Baby- No. 20
- Let Me Be- No. 29
- Can I Get To Know You Better- No. 89
