= Turtle Soup =

Studio album by the Turtles
- Released: October 1969
- Recorded: April 12 – July 2, 1969
- Studios: United, Los Angeles
- Genres: Rock; pop
- Length: 37:25
- Label: White Whale
- Producer: Ray Davies

The Turtles chronology
The Turtles Present the Battle of the Bands (1968)	Turtle Soup (1969)

Singles from Turtle Soup
- 1. "You Don't Have to Walk in the Rain" / "Come Over" Released: May 1969; 2. "Love in the City" / "Bachelor Mother" Released: September 1969

Turtle Soup is the fifth and final studio album by the American rock band the Turtles. It was released in 1969 on the White Whale Records label. The album was produced by Ray Davies of the Kinks – the first time he produced another act's record. A 1993 Repertoire Records CD issue included eight bonus tracks. A 1996 Sundazed Music reissue included two bonus tracks.

Turtle Soup peaked at number 117 on the Billboard Pop Albums chart. Two singles from the album also earned a place on the Billboard Pop Singles chart: "You Don't Have to Walk in the Rain" (number 51) and "Love in the City" (number 91).

== Recording and release ==
Professional ratings
Review scores
Source	Rating
Allmusic	3.5/5 stars
Tom Hull	B

The Turtles hired Ray Davies of the Kinks to produce Turtle Soup, having admired his production of the Kinks' latest album, The Village Green Preservation Society, which was released in the United States in February 1969. Recording for Turtle Soup took place at United Recording Studios in Los Angeles over two separate weeks, running April 12 to 17 and June 24 to July 2, 1969. Chuck Britz served as audio engineer for the sessions, and Ray Pohlman, the musical director of the musical variety series Shindig!, provided string and horn arrangements.

Of the six songs recorded in April, "House on the Hill" was considered for release as a single, but the label withdrew its release after making promotional copies. "You Don't Have to Walk in the Rain" backed with "Come Over" was instead issued by White Whale Records in the US in May and by London Records in the UK on June 3.

== Track listing ==
All tracks written by Howard Kaylan, Mark Volman, Al Nichol, Jim Pons and John Seiter.

=== Side one ===
1. "Come Over" – 2:18
2. "House on the Hill" – 2:58
3. "She Always Leaves Me Laughing" – 2:46
4. "How You Loved Me" – 2:56
5. "Torn Between Temptations" – 2:45
6. "Love in the City" – 3:37

=== Side two ===
1. "Bachelor Mother" – 2:38
2. "John and Julie" – 3:10
3. "Hot Little Hands" – 4:10
4. "Somewhere Friday Night" – 3:20
5. "Dance This Dance" – 3:30
6. "You Don't Have to Walk in the Rain" – 2:42

=== Repertoire bonus tracks ===
13. "Chicken Little Was Right" (Single version) – 2:53
14. "Lady-O" (Judee Sill) – 2:53
15. "The Last Thing I Remember" – 3:25
16. "The Owl" – 4:26
17. "To See the Sun" – 4:12
18. "If We Only Had the Time" – 5:09
19. "Can I Go On" – 3:00
20. "Dance This Dance" – 3:17

=== Sundazed bonus tracks ===
13. "Lady-O" (Sill) – 2:54
14. "The Last Thing I Remember" (1986 Chalon Road LP Version) (hidden track with 1969 radio commercial starts at 3:30) – 4:28

=== Manifesto bonus tracks ===
13. "Goodbye Surprise" (Alan Gordon, Gary Bonner) – 2:55
14. "Like It or Not" (Gordon, Bonner) – 3:41
15. "There You Sit Lonely" (Kaylan, Volman) – 3:42
16. "Can I Go On" – 2:59
17. "You Want to Be a Woman" – 3:25
18. "If We Only Had the Time" – 5:11
19. "Dance This Dance With Me" (demo) – 3:17
20. "Come Over" (demo) – 2:22
21. "How You Love Me" (demo) – 3:39
22. "Strange Girl" (demo) – 2:45
23. "Marmendy Mill" (demo) – 3:13
24. "Turtle Soup Radio Spot" – 0:55

== Personnel ==
The Turtles

- Howard Kaylan – vocals, organ, percussion
- Mark Volman – vocals, guitar, percussion
- Al Nichol – guitar, keyboards, six-string bass, vocals
- Jim Pons – bass, guitar, vocals
- John Seiter – drums, piano, vocals

Production

- Produced by Ray Davies
- Engineer: Chuck Britz
- String and horn arrangements: Ray Pohlman
- Art direction, design: Gary Burden
- Photography: Henry Diltz
