= Mark Volman =

American musician (1947–2025)

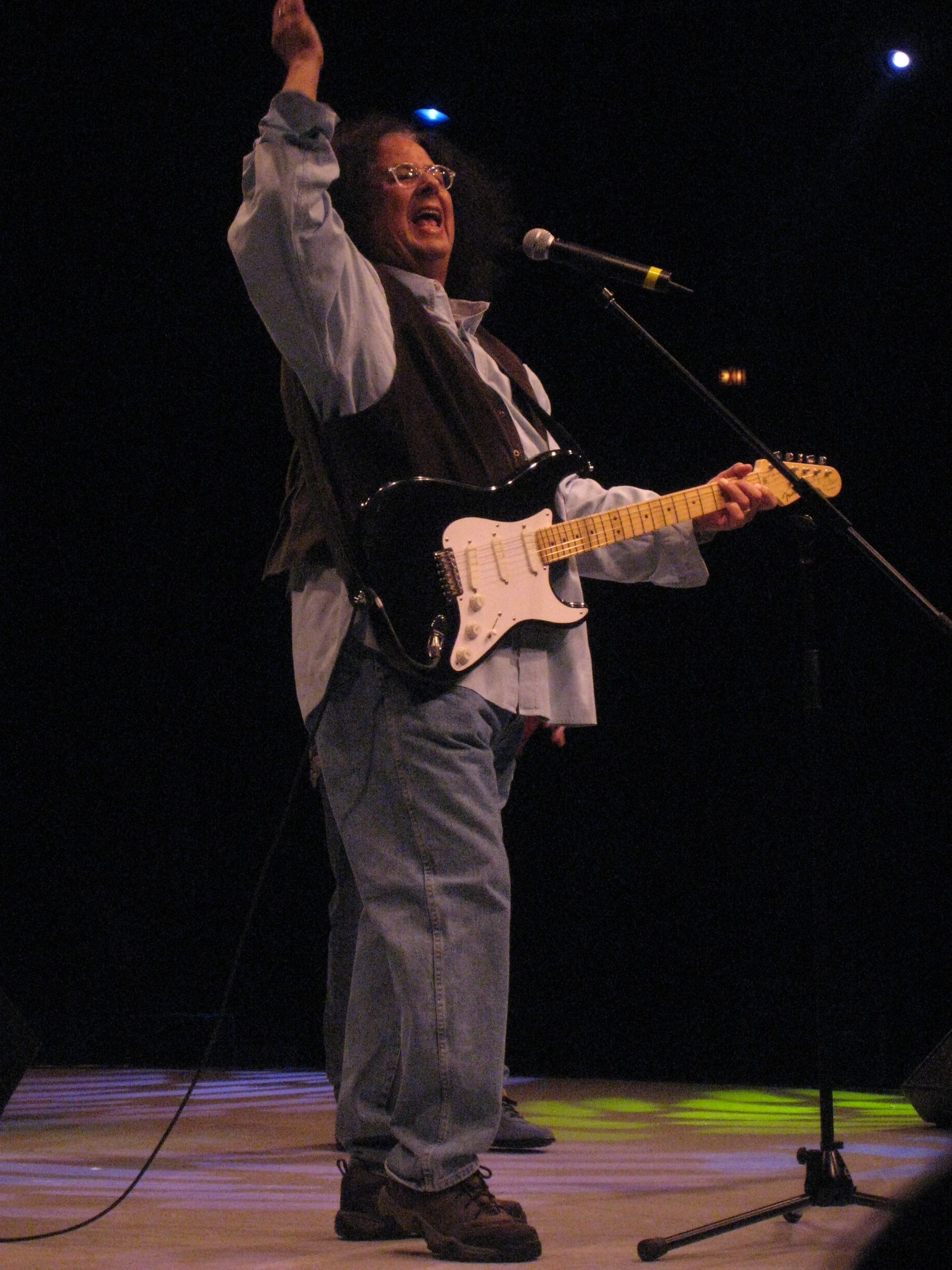
- Volman performing in 2008 billed as "The Turtles Featuring Flo & Eddie" (with Fender Stratocaster)

Background information
- Also known as: Flo; Phlorescent Leech
- Born: Mark Randall Volman; April 19, 1947; Los Angeles, California, U.S.
- Died: September 5, 2025 (aged 78) Nashville, Tennessee, U.S.
- Genres: Rock; pop
- Occupations: Musician; songwriter; professor
- Instruments: Vocals; guitar; keyboards; tambourine
- Years active: 1965–2025
- Labels: Warner Bros.; Columbia
- Formerly of: The Turtles; Flo & Eddie; The Mothers of Invention
- Website: www.theturtles.com

Mark Randall Volman (April 19, 1947 – September 5, 2025) was an American vocalist, guitarist and songwriter who was best known as a founding member of the 1960s rock band The Turtles. With his bandmate and friend Howard Kaylan, he was a member of the 1970s rock duo Flo & Eddie, in which he used the pseudonym Flo (short for The Phlorescent Leech). Volman later joined Frank Zappa's band The Mothers of Invention.

== Early life ==
Volman was born in Los Angeles, California, on April 19, 1947, to a Jewish father, Joe Yarnatinski, who changed his name to Volman, and a Catholic mother, Bea (née Campillo). He was raised in the Westchester neighborhood, where he performed in his mid-teens with Kaylan in a proto-Turtles band called the Crossfires. He graduated from Westchester High School in 1965.

== Career ==
=== Music and film ===
Volman and Howard Kaylan were founding members of the Turtles, a popular band of the late 1960s. In 1965, shortly after leaving school, they were touring with Herman's Hermits and playing to audiences of 50,000. Their cover of Bob Dylan's "It Ain't Me Babe" gave them a Top Ten hit. They had another US Top 20 hit in 1966 with "You Baby". "Happy Together" replaced the Beatles at Number One in early 1967 and they sang it on the Ed Sullivan Show. Volman and Kaylan had sung together in their school choir, and further hits, characterized by their "pristine Beach Boys-style harmony vocals", included "She'd Rather Be With Me" and "Elenore".

In December 1968, NME magazine reported that Volman had insured his distinctive frizzy hair for US$100,000 against fire, theft or loss due to illness. The band folded in 1970. Volman and Kaylan planned to continue working together, but discovered that the terms of their contract forbade them to use not only the name 'The Turtles' but also their own names. They reinvented themselves as the Phlorescent Leech & Eddie, which was shortened to Flo and Eddie when they were recruited by Frank Zappa to join the Mothers of Invention. They worked together as Flo & Eddie in music, providing backing vocals for T. Rex and Bruce Springsteen and touring with Alice Cooper; in film (they provided music and voices for animated films like Down and Dirty Duck); and in radio broadcasting. Alice Cooper was quoted as saying "They had such pure voices. Everybody wanted to work with Mark and Howard." They made several albums of sardonic songs under the Flo & Eddie name. In 1971 Volman appeared in and on the soundtrack to Zappa's humorous pseudo-documentary film, 200 Motels. In the mid-1980s they regained possession of their naming rights after a "long legal battle".

In 2015, Kaylan and Volman celebrated their 50th year, touring and performing more than 60 concerts a year, billed as "The Turtles ... Featuring Flo & Eddie" with their Happy Together Tour, a classic revue-format show featuring some popular bands of the mid-to-late 1960s musical era. During this tour in 2015, Volman was diagnosed with throat cancer, but was declared cancer-free in 2016. Kaylan retired in 2018 because of ill health.

According to The Hollywood Reporter, Volman and Kaylan had been "leading the charge against the uncompensated use of their music, and using state-based misappropriation, conversation [sic] and unfair competition claims because sound recordings only began falling under federal copyright protection in 1972."

In 2023, Volman co-wrote his biography with John Cody and several other former bandmates and colleagues, titled Happy Forever: My Musical Adventures With The Turtles, Frank Zappa, T. Rex, Flo & Eddie, And More.

=== Academia ===
In 1992, at age 45, Volman started his bachelor's degree at Loyola Marymount University. He was an active undergraduate member of the choir and a Founding Father of the California Chi chapter of Sigma Phi Epsilon fraternity. Volman graduated with a B.A. degree in 1997 magna cum laude and was the class valedictorian speaker. During the speech he led the graduates in a chorus of "Happy Together". CBS Evening News covered Volman's graduation and interviewed his parents, who were perplexed at their son's academic accomplishments.

Volman earned a Master's degree in Fine Arts with an emphasis in communications and screenwriting in 1999, also from Loyola. After earning his degree he taught Music Business & Industry courses in the Communications and Fine Arts department at Loyola. He also taught courses in the Commercial Music Program at Los Angeles Valley College. He later became an associate professor and coordinator of the Entertainment Industry Studies Program at Belmont University, in the Mike Curb College of Entertainment and Music Business, and conducted seminars about the music industry. He became a professor at Belmont University in Nashville, lecturing on the music business for various academic institutions from junior high school to university level. In addition, he offered consulting on music business and entertainment through the website Ask Professor Flo.

== Personal life and death ==
Volman married his high school sweetheart, Patricia Lee Hickey, in January 1967 and they were married for 25 years. The couple had two daughters, Sarina Marie and Hallie Rae Volman. Volman married his second wife, Emily, in 2000. They were divorced in 2015.

In June 2023, Volman disclosed that he had been diagnosed with Lewy body dementia. He died on September 5, 2025, at the age of 78, from complications of a blood disease.

== Discography ==
=== With The Turtles ===
==== Studio albums ====
Year	Album	Label
1965	It Ain't Me Babe	White Whale
1966	You Baby	White Whale
1967	Happy Together	White Whale
1968	The Turtles Present the Battle of the Bands	White Whale
1969	Turtle Soup	White Whale

==== Singles ====
Year	Title (A-side / B-side) Both sides from same album except where indicated	Album	Label
1965	"It Ain't Me Babe" / "Almost There" (from You, Baby)	It Ain't Me, Babe	
1965	"Let Me Be" / "Your Maw Said You Cried (In Your Sleep Last Night)"	It Ain't Me, Babe	
1966	"You Baby" / "Wanderin' Kind" (from It Ain't Me, Babe)	You, Baby	
1966	"It Was a Very Good Year" / "Let the Cold Winds Blow"	It Ain't Me, Babe	
1966	"Grim Reaper of Love" / "Come Back" (from Wooden Head)	Golden Hits	
1966	"We'll Meet Again" / "Outside Chance" (from Golden Hits)	Wooden Head	
1966	"Making My Mind Up" / "Outside Chance" (from Golden Hits)	Happy Together	
1966	"Can I Get to Know You Better?" / "Like the Seasons" (from Happy Together)	Golden Hits	
1967	"Happy Together" / "Like the Seasons"	Happy Together	
1967	"She'd Rather Be with Me" / "The Walking Song"	Happy Together	
1967	"Guide for the Married Man" / "Think I'll Run Away"	Happy Together	
1967	"You Know What I Mean" / "Rugs of Woods & Flowers" (from Happy Together)	Golden Hits	
1967	"She's My Girl" / "Chicken Little Was Right" (Non-LP track. A re-recording of this song later appeared on The Turtles Present the Battle of the Bands)	More Golden Hits	
1968	"Sound Asleep" / "Umbassa the Dragon" (Non-LP track)	More Golden Hits	
1968	"The Story of Rock and Roll" / "Can You Hear the Cows" (Non-LP track)	More Golden Hits	
1968	"Elenore" / "Surfer Dan"	The Turtles Present the Battle of the Bands	
1969	"You Showed Me" / "Buzzsaw"	The Turtles Present the Battle of the Bands	
1969	"House on the Hill" / "Come Over"	Turtle Soup	
1969	"You Don't Have to Walk in the Rain" / "Come Over"	Turtle Soup	
1969	"Love in the City" / "Bachelor Mother"	Turtle Soup	
1969	"Lady-O" / "Somewhere Friday Night" (From "Turtle Soup")	More Golden Hits	
1970	"Teardrops" / "Gas Money"	Non-LP track (released under the alias: "The Dedications")	
1970	"Who Would Ever Think That I Would Marry Margaret?" / "We Ain't Gonna Party No More"	More Golden Hits	
1970	"Is It Any Wonder?" / "Wanderin' Kind" (from Wooden Head)	Golden Hits	
1970	"Eve of Destruction" / "Wanderin' Kind" (from Wooden Head)	It Ain't Me, Babe	
1970	"Me About You" / "Think I'll Run Away"	Happy Together	
1978	"To See the Sun" /"The Owl" /"Surfer Dan" (Alternate Version)/"The Last Thing I Remember" (Alternate Version)	Rhino Records 12″ EP Picture Disc (1968 Outtakes)	

=== With The Mothers of Invention ===
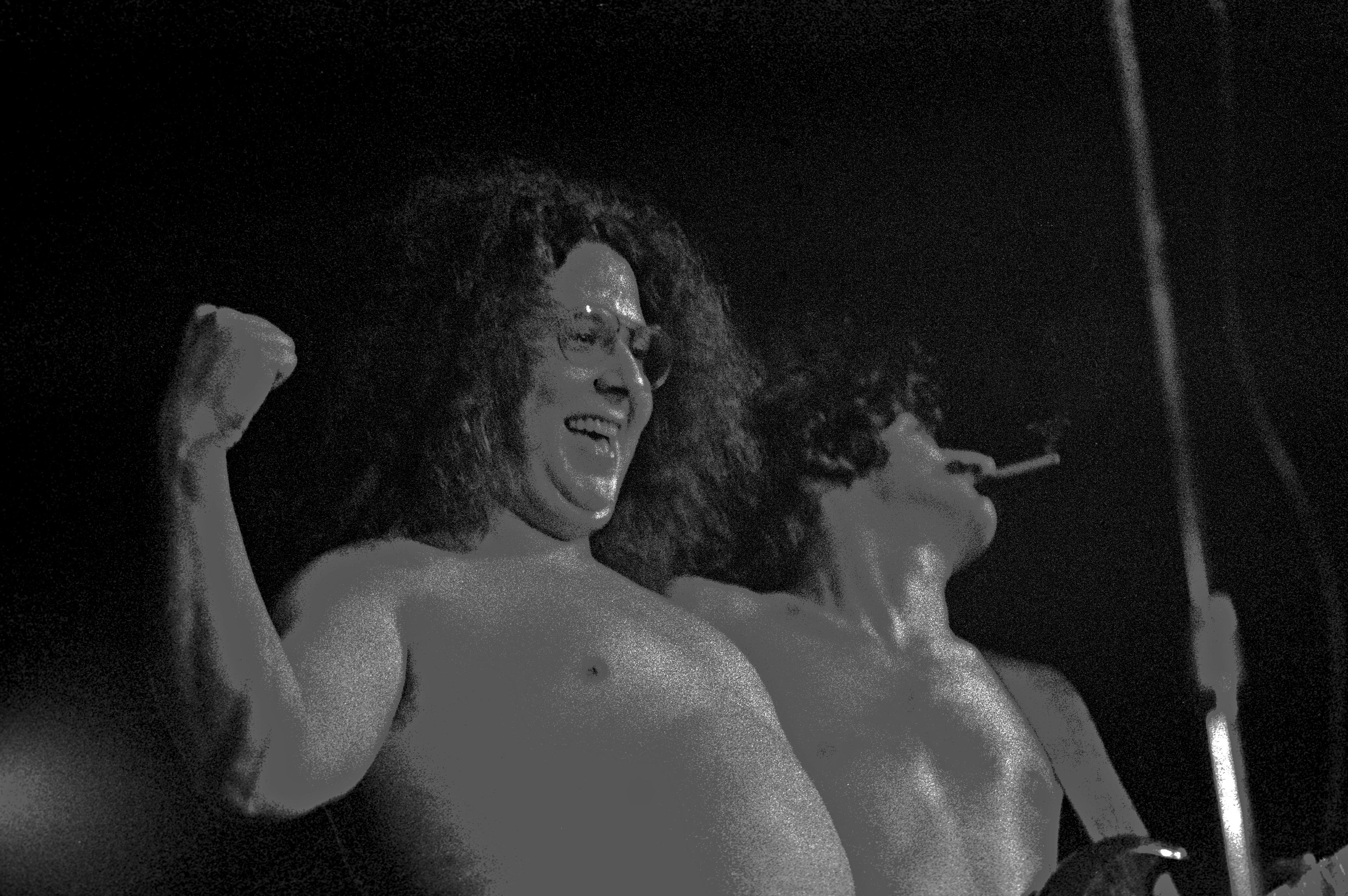
Volman (and Frank Zappa in background); 25th of November 1971, Hamburg

==== Studio albums ====
Title	Year
Chunga's Revenge	1970
Fillmore East – June 1971	1971
200 Motels	1971
Just Another Band from L.A.	1972

==== Singles ====
Single (A-side, B-side) Both sides from same album except where indicated	Album	Year
"Tell Me You Love Me" b/w "Will You Go All the Way for the U.S.A.?" [sic]	Chunga's Revenge	1970
"Tears Began to Fall" (remix) b/w "Junier Mintz Boogie" (non-album track)	Fillmore East – June 1971	1971
"Magic Fingers" b/w "Daddy, Daddy, Daddy"	200 Motels	1971
"What Will This Evening Bring Me This Morning" b/w "Daddy, Daddy, Daddy"	200 Motels	1971

=== With Flo & Eddie ===
==== Albums ====
- The Phlorescent Leech & Eddie (1972)
- Flo & Eddie (1973)
- Illegal, Immoral and Fattening (1975)
- Flo & Eddie Interview with Barry Mann, Special Promotion Record for Radio Stations (1975)
- Moving Targets (1976)
- Rock Steady With Flo & Eddie (1981)
- The History of Flo & Eddie and the Turtles (1983)
- The Best of Flo & Eddie (1987)
- The Turtles featuring Flo & Eddie Captured Live! (1992)
- New York "Times" (2009)
