= It Ain't Me Babe (album) =

Studio album by the Turtles
- Released: October 1965
- Recorded: 1965
- Genre: Folk rock
- Length: 27:04
- Label: White Whale
- Producers: Bones Howe; Lee Lasseff; Ted Feigin

The Turtles chronology
It Ain't Me Babe (1965)	You Baby (1966)

Singles from It Ain't Me Babe
- 1. "It Ain't Me Babe" Released: July 1965; 2. "Let Me Be" Released: August 1965

It Ain't Me Babe is the debut studio album by the American rock band the Turtles. It was released in October 1965 on White Whale Records, and produced by Bones Howe, Lee Lasseff, and Ted Feigin in 1965. The album produced two singles, the title track (a Bob Dylan song) and "Let Me Be" (a P.F. Sloan song). Both of the singles reached the top 40 in the Billboard Hot 100, peaking at number 8 and 29 respectively. The album itself peaked at #98 on Billboard's Top 200 Albums chart and at #35 in Cashbox.

== Background and release ==
Prior to recording, the band members required written permission from their parents due to being underage. Included on the album is original work from the band's high school performing days and their own interpretations of popular songs from other musicians. The most successful track, lead single "It Ain't Me Babe", reached #8 on the national charts, whilst the second single, "Let Me Be" peaked at number 29.

Sundazed Music licensed the rights to the Turtles' library and has re-released most of the group's early albums. In 2016, a remastered edition was issued as part of the box set The Complete Original Album Collection featuring both the mono and stereo mixes of the album on a single CD; this edition was also issued separately in 2017.

Professional ratings
Review scores
Source	Rating
Allmusic	4/5 stars
Tom Hull	B+

== Track listing ==
Side one
No.	Title	Writer(s)	Length
1.	"Wanderin' Kind"	Howard Kaylan	2:06
2.	"It Was a Very Good Year"	Ervin Drake	1:55
3.	"Your Maw Said You Cried"	Stephen Schlaks; B. Glazer	1:43
4.	"Eve of Destruction"	P.F. Sloan	2:40
5.	"Glitter and Gold"	Barry Mann; Cynthia Weil	2:08
6.	"Let Me Be"	P.F. Sloan	2:20

Side two
No.	Title	Writer(s)	Length
1.	"Let the Cold Winds Blow"	Kaylan	2:18
2.	"It Ain't Me Babe"	Bob Dylan	2:09
3.	"A Walk in the Sun"	Kaylan	2:13
4.	"Last Laugh"	Kaylan; Nita Garfield	1:45
5.	"Love Minus Zero/No Limit"	Dylan	2:53
6.	"Like a Rolling Stone"	Dylan	3:15

Sundazed CD edition
No.	Title	Writer(s)	Length
1.	"Wanderin' Kind"	Howard Kaylan	2:06
2.	"It Was a Very Good Year"	Ervin Drake	1:55
3.	"Your Maw Said You Cried"	Stephen Schlaks; B. Glazer	1:43
4.	"Eve of Destruction"	P.F. Sloan	2:40
5.	"Glitter and Gold"	Barry Mann; Cynthia Weil	2:08
6.	"Let the Cold Winds Blow"	Kaylan	2:18
7.	"It Ain't Me Babe"	Dylan	2:09
8.	"A Walk in the Sun"	Kaylan	2:13
9.	"Last Laugh"	Kaylan; Nita Garfield	1:45
10.	"Love Minus Zero/No Limit"	Dylan	2:53
11.	"Like a Rolling Stone"	Dylan	3:15
12.	"We'll Meet Again"	Hughie Charles; Ross Parker	2:30
13.	"Grim Reaper of Love"	Al Nichol; Chuck Portz	2:43
14.	"So Goes Love"	Carole King; Gerry Goffin	2:40

== Personnel ==
- Al Nichol – lead guitar, keyboards, vocals, bass guitar
- Jim Tucker – rhythm guitar, vocals
- Mark Volman – guitar, tambourine, vocals
- Don Murray – drums
- Howard Kaylan – keyboards, lead vocals
- Chuck Portz – bass guitar, vocals

== Charts ==
Billboard 200-

- It Ain't Me Babe- No. 98

Billboard Hot 100-

- It Ain't Me Babe- No. 8
- The Grim Reaper of Love- No. 81
