= Howard Kaylan =

Musical artist (born 1947)

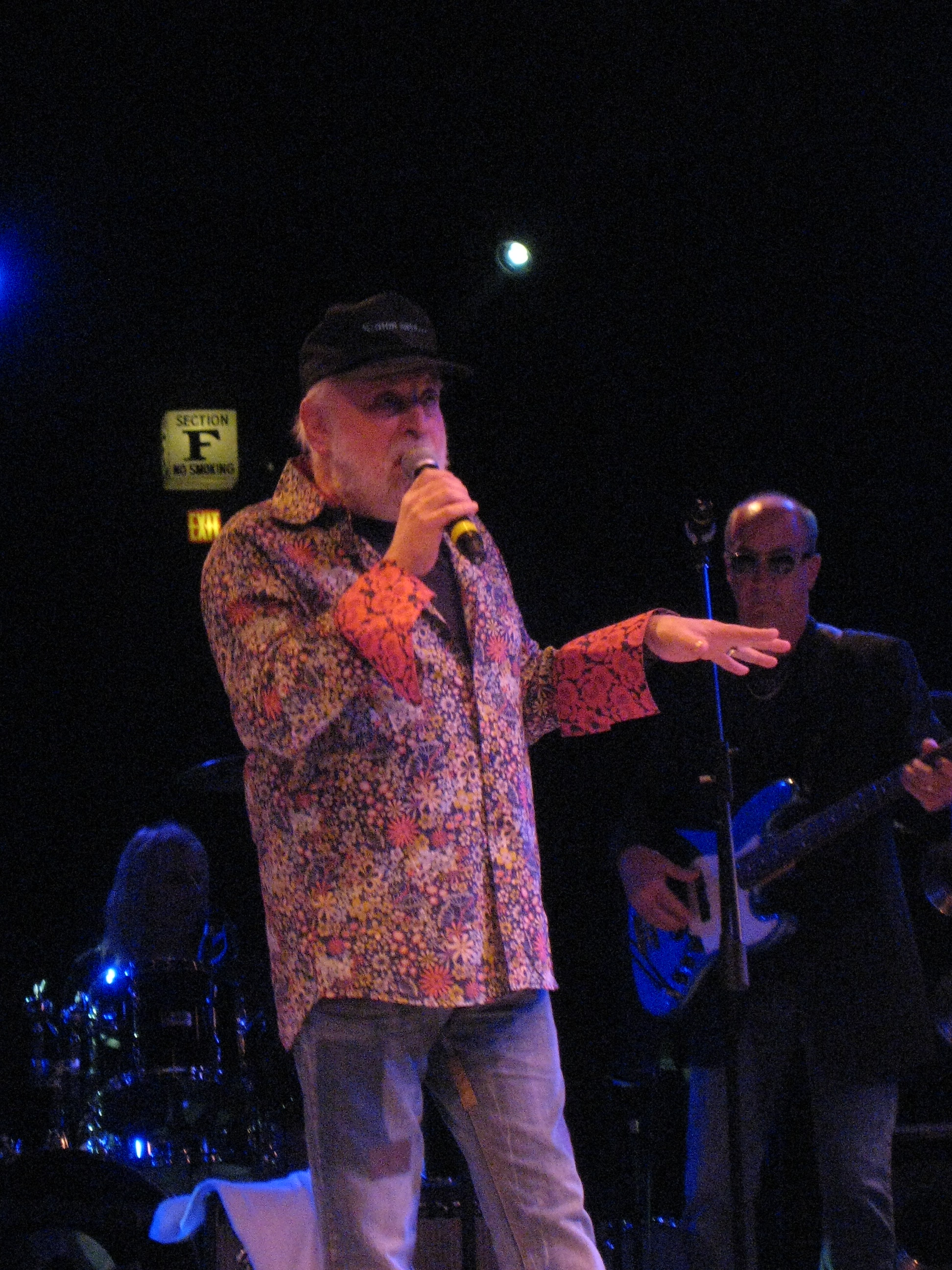
- Kaylan performing in 2008 billed as "The Turtles Featuring Flo & Eddie"

Background information
- Also known as: "Eddie"
- Born: Howard Lawrence Kaplan; June 22, 1947 (age 78); New York City, U.S.
- Genres: Rock; pop
- Occupation: Musician
- Instruments: Vocals; keyboards; clarinet; saxophone
- Years active: 1964–2018
- Labels: Warner Bros.; Columbia
- Formerly of: The Turtles; The Mothers of Invention; Flo & Eddie
- Website: howardkaylan.com

Howard Kaylan (born Howard Lawrence Kaplan; June 22, 1947) is an American retired musician and songwriter, who was a founding member and lead singer of the 1960s rock band The Turtles, and, with bandmate and friend Mark Volman, a member of the 1970s rock duo Flo & Eddie, where he used the pseudonym Eddie. He also was a member of Frank Zappa's band, The Mothers of Invention.

== Early years ==
Kaylan was born in the Bronx to a Jewish family and grew up in Utica, New York, and Westchester, a neighborhood of Los Angeles, California. He studied choral music and clarinet, and won a Bank of America Fine Arts Award at age 16. He graduated early (as valedictorian) from Westchester High School, and briefly attended University of California, Los Angeles on a scholarship.

== Music career ==
=== The Turtles ===
Kaylan and Mark Volman founded The Turtles, a popular band of the late 1960s, for which, despite the fact that not all of their songs were written by the band members, Kaylan has been a prolific songwriter, and co-wrote "Elenore" with his bandmates. In May of 1970, Kaylan and Volman signed on as members of Frank Zappa's band, The Mothers of Invention. The pair recorded tracks on five albums and appeared in the film 200 Motels, a semi-documentary film directed by Zappa. They were compelled to use the names Flo & Eddie ("Flo" being shortened from "Phlorescent Leech") and were not allowed legal use of their own names, or that of The Turtles, until multiple lawsuits from that band were settled in 1985.

In 1985 the name "The Turtles" reverted to Kaylan and Volman after fifteen years in litigation, as well as all of the master recordings they made. Thanks to Burger King, the NFL, Sony PlayStation, and countless other television advertisements and motion pictures, the Turtles' catalog remains a staple for licensing and reproduction in the twenty-first century.

=== Frank Zappa ===
Kaylan and Volman joined The Mothers of Invention, Frank Zappa's band, after the Turtles broke up, but were contractually prevented from using their real names, and were thus given the names "The Phlorescent Leech" (Volman) and "Eddie" (Kaylan).

Phlorescent Leech and Eddie appeared on Frank Zappa's 1970 album Chunga's Revenge and in 1971 as lead vocalists on Zappa's Fillmore East album as Howard Kaylan/Mark Volman where they sang "Happy Together", then on Just Another Band From L.A., 200 Motels and much later Playground Psychotics and other Zappa compilations of old live concerts from 1970–71.

Kaylan and Volman left The Mothers of Invention after an irate fan pushed Zappa into the orchestra pit at the Rainbow Theatre in London during a concert on December 10, 1971, seriously injuring him. With Zappa using a wheelchair and unable to sing or play guitar for a year, The Mothers of Invention were on hiatus so Kaylan and Volman set out on their own as Flo & Eddie, never officially returning to the Mothers.

=== Flo & Eddie ===
Kaylan and Volman signed with Columbia as Flo & Eddie. In his autobiography Shell Shocked, Kaylan revealed that upon receiving the cover art for their first album, they were appalled to learn that the printer had mistakenly printed the duo's stage names in the wrong order above their photograph. Volman was identified as Flo, which had been Kaylan's stage name in Zappa's band, and Kaylan was identified as Eddie, Volman's stage name. The label refused to reprint the cover, saying that it would cost too much money. Thus, Kaylan and Volman decided to professionally swap stage names.

Flo & Eddie released nine albums on Warner Bros. Records and Columbia Records in music; in film they provided music and voices for animated films like Down and Dirty Duck; and they appeared in radio broadcasting.

In the 1980s, Rock Steady With Flo & Eddie was recorded in Kingston, Jamaica, and the partners began writing comedy and script with Chris Bearde, Larry Gelbart, and Carl Gottlieb. Simultaneously, they began writing regularly featured columns for Creem, Phonograph Record Magazine and the Los Angeles Free Press.

They also produced many albums for other bands and artists, as well as singing backing vocals on over 100 albums. Flo & Eddie can be heard singing with John Lennon, Bruce Springsteen, Ramones, Blondie, Duran Duran, The Psychedelic Furs, T. Rex, Alice Cooper and many more.

=== Solo work ===
In the mid-1990s, Kaylan turned his attention to the collecting and writing of dark fantasy literature and science fiction. He wrote two short stories, by way of experimentation, and both were published in the best-selling anthologies Phantoms of the Night and Forbidden Acts.

In 2006, Kaylan released a solo album, Dust Bunnies, described as songs "hand-picked by Kaylan from years of seldom-heard B-sides and album cuts recorded by many of his favorite artists and supplemented by new arrangements of more familiar pieces and a rock original or two." It includes covers of The Honeycombs' "Have I the Right?", Barry Ryan's "Eloise", and The Left Banke's "Love Songs in the Night" and "Two by Two".

As of 2008 Kaylan penned the widely read "Eddie's Media Corner" on his official website.

=== Health and retirement ===
In 2018, Kaylan retired from touring due to requiring heart and back surgery; he was replaced in the Happy Together tour by Ron Dante (of the Archies, the Cuff Links, and the Detergents fame).

== Media appearances ==
He portrayed an orthodox minister who "married" Laura to Stavros in a dream sequence on General Hospital, an old hippie on Suddenly Susan, and a younger one on the It's Garry Shandling's Show.

In 1983, Kaylan appeared in the comedy Get Crazy, starring Malcolm McDowell and Daniel Stern. Kaylan played the part of Captain Cloud, a spiritual guru type of character, leader of a caravan of time-lost, gypsy-like hippies. In 1987, Kaylan and Volman appeared in a new music video of the song "Happy Together", made to promote the romantic comedy Making Mr. Right, which featured the song during its end credits.

In 2001, Kaylan wrote a treatment for a very short film about his first night on tour in London. After taking it to his friend (and Rhino Records president) Harold Bronson for input, the project was lengthened and shot as a one-hour movie. The following year, scenes were added, and it was back into the movie studio again to complete a full-length feature. My Dinner with Jimi thus became the first film written by Kaylan. It was produced by Bronson for Rhino Entertainment and directed by Bill Fishman (Tapeheads, Car 54, Where Are You?) for Fallout Films. In 2005, Kaylan appeared in a featured role in Stephen King's Riding the Bullet.

Kaylan's autobiography Shell Shocked: My Life with the Turtles, Flo and Eddie, and Frank Zappa, Etc. was published by Backbeat Books in March 2013. The book was written with Jeff Tamarkin, and it included a foreword by Penn Jillette and cover art by Cal Schenkel.

== Discography ==
=== With The Turtles ===
==== Studio albums ====
Year	Album	Label
1965	It Ain't Me Babe	White Whale
1966	You Baby	White Whale
1967	Happy Together	White Whale
1968	The Turtles Present the Battle of the Bands	White Whale
1969	Turtle Soup	White Whale

==== Singles ====
Year	Title (A-side / B-side) Both sides from same album except where indicated	Album	Label
1965	"It Ain't Me Babe" / "Almost There" (from You, Baby)	It Ain't Me, Babe	White Whale
1965	"Let Me Be" / "Your Maw Said You Cried (In Your Sleep Last Night)"	It Ain't Me, Babe	White Whale
1966	"You Baby" / "Wanderin' Kind" (from It Ain't Me, Babe)	You, Baby	White Whale
1966	"It Was a Very Good Year" / "Let the Cold Winds Blow"	It Ain't Me, Babe	White Whale
1966	"Grim Reaper of Love" / "Come Back" (from Wooden Head)	Golden Hits	White Whale
1966	"We'll Meet Again" / "Outside Chance" (from Golden Hits)	Wooden Head	White Whale
1966	"Making My Mind Up" / "Outside Chance" (from Golden Hits)	Happy Together	White Whale
1966	"Can I Get to Know You Better?" / "Like the Seasons" (from Happy Together)	Golden Hits	White Whale
1967	"Happy Together" / "Like the Seasons"	Happy Together	White Whale
1967	"She'd Rather Be with Me" / "The Walking Song"	Happy Together	White Whale
1967	"Guide for the Married Man" / "Think I'll Run Away"	Happy Together	White Whale
1967	"You Know What I Mean" / "Rugs of Woods & Flowers" (from Happy Together)	Golden Hits	White Whale
1967	"She's My Girl" / "Chicken Little Was Right" (Non-LP track. A re-recording of this song later appeared on The Turtles Present the Battle of the Bands)	More Golden Hits	White Whale
1968	"Sound Asleep" / "Umbassa the Dragon" (Non-LP track)	More Golden Hits	White Whale
1968	"The Story of Rock and Roll" / "Can You Hear the Cows" (Non-LP track)	More Golden Hits	White Whale
1968	"Elenore" / "Surfer Dan"	The Turtles Present the Battle of the Bands	White Whale
1969	"You Showed Me" / "Buzzsaw"	The Turtles Present the Battle of the Bands	White Whale
1969	"House on the Hill" / "Come Over"	Turtle Soup	White Whale
1969	"You Don't Have to Walk in the Rain" / "Come Over"	Turtle Soup	White Whale
1969	"Love in the City" / "Bachelor Mother"	Turtle Soup	White Whale
1969	"Lady-O" / "Somewhere Friday Night" (From "Turtle Soup")	More Golden Hits	White Whale
1970	"Teardrops" / "Gas Money"	Non-LP track (released under the alias: "The Dedications")	White Whale
1970	"Who Would Ever Think That I Would Marry Margaret?" / "We Ain't Gonna Party No More"	More Golden Hits	White Whale
1970	"Is It Any Wonder?" / "Wanderin' Kind" (from Wooden Head)	Golden Hits	White Whale
1970	"Eve of Destruction" / "Wanderin' Kind" (from Wooden Head)	It Ain't Me, Babe	White Whale
1970	"Me About You" / "Think I'll Run Away"	Happy Together	White Whale
1978	"To See the Sun" /"The Owl" /"Surfer Dan" (Alternate Version)/"The Last Thing I Remember" (Alternate Version)	Rhino Records 12″ EP Picture Disc (1968 Outtakes)	

=== With The Mothers of Invention ===
==== Studio albums ====
Title	Year
Chunga's Revenge	1970
Fillmore East – June 1971	1971
200 Motels	1971
Just Another Band from L.A.	1972

==== Singles ====
Single (A-side, B-side) Both sides from same album except where indicated	Album	Year
"Tell Me You Love Me" b/w "Will You Go All the Way for the U.S.A.?" [sic]	Chunga's Revenge	1970
"Tears Began to Fall" (remix) b/w "Junier Mintz Boogie" (non-album track)	Fillmore East – June 1971	1971
"Magic Fingers" b/w "Daddy, Daddy, Daddy"	200 Motels	1971
"What Will This Evening Bring Me This Morning" b/w "Daddy, Daddy, Daddy"	200 Motels	1971

=== With Flo & Eddie ===
==== Albums ====
- The Phlorescent Leech & Eddie (1972)
- Flo & Eddie (1973)
- Illegal, Immoral and Fattening (1975)
- Flo & Eddie Interview with Barry Mann, Special Promotion Record for Radio Stations (1975)
- Moving Targets (1976)
- Rock Steady With Flo & Eddie (1981)
- The History of Flo & Eddie and the Turtles (1983)
- The Best of Flo & Eddie (1987)
- The Turtles featuring Flo & Eddie Captured Live! (1992)
- New York "Times" (2009)
