= Let Me Be (The Turtles song) =

Single by The Turtles

from the album It Ain't Me Babe
- B-side: "Your Maw Said You Cried"
- Released: October 1965
- Studio: Western Studio, Hollywood
- Genre: Pop rock; folk rock
- Length: 2:20
- Label: White Whale
- Songwriter: P.F. Sloan
- Producer: Bones Howe

The Turtles singles chronology
"It Ain't Me Babe" (1965)	"Let Me Be" (1965)	"You Baby" (1966)

"Let Me Be" is a song by the American rock band the Turtles. It was released in 1965 as the band's second single, following their successful cover of Bob Dylan's "It Ain't Me Babe". In the United States, the single peaked at number 29 on the Billboard Hot 100 in November 1965. It reached number 14 on Canada's RPM chart. On the New Zealand listener chart it reached #18.

The song was written by P.F. Sloan and produced by Bones Howe. The lyrics served as a message of defiance against societal norms and a call for freedom for personal expression. Turtles vocalist Howard Kaylan recalled that the band first turned down Sloan's song "Eve of Destruction", which became a number 1 hit in the U.S. for Barry McGuire, recognizing that, with its uncompromising message, "You just couldn't make a statement like that and ever work again." He said that they accepted "Let Me Be" because it represented "just the perfect level of rebellion … haircuts and non-conformity".

Author Peter Doggett describes "Let Me Be" as a "perfect encapsulation of teenage angst". In his book 1965: The Most Revolutionary Year in Music, Andrew Grant Jackson identifies it as part of a "subgenre" of protest songs that emerged during 1965, in which musicians railed against "oppressive conformity itself" rather than political issues. He adds that, in a cultural climate influenced by mass media, hallucinogenic drugs, and the introduction of the contraceptive pill, this and contemporary songs by artists such as Aretha Franklin, Sam Cooke, the Animals, the Beatles, the Rolling Stones, and the Who "chronicled and propelled a social reformation as the old world forged its uneasy synthesis with the new".

== Personnel ==
- Howard Kaylan - lead vocals
- Mark Volman - harmony vocals; tambourine
- Al Nichol - harmony vocals; 12-string electric guitar
- Jim Tucker - acoustic guitar
- Chuck Portz - bass guitar
- Don Murray - drums
