= Happy Together (The Turtles album) =

Studio album by the Turtles
- Released: April 1967
- Recorded: January 1966 – April 1967
- Studio: Sunset Sound and United Western Recorders, Hollywood
- Genre: Rock, Pop
- Length: 27:12
- Label: White Whale
- Producer: Joe Wissert; Bones Howe

The Turtles chronology
You Baby (1966)	Happy Together (1967)	The Turtles Present the Battle of the Bands (1968)

Singles from Happy Together
- 1. "Happy Together" Released: January 1967; 2. "She'd Rather Be with Me" Released: April 1967; 3. "Guide for the Married Man" Released: June 1967

Professional ratings
Review scores
Source	Rating
Allmusic	4.5/5 stars
Tom Hull	C−

Happy Together is the third studio album by the American rock band the Turtles. It was released in April 1967 on White Whale Records, and was recorded from January 1966 to April 1967 at Sunset Sound Recorders and United Western Recorders in Hollywood, Los Angeles. The recording sessions were produced by Bones Howe (who also helped in the production of the band's first two studio albums, It Ain't Me Babe and You Baby) and Joe Wissert.

The album produced three singles: The title track (which became the band's biggest hit, topping the Billboard Hot 100), "She'd Rather Be with Me" (the band's second biggest hit, charting at number 3), and "Guide for the Married Man", the signature track for the movie of the same name. The album itself would become the band's highest charting studio album, hitting number 25 on the Billboard 200, and would also chart at number 15 in Cashbox, the highest charting position of the album, and the highest out of any of their studio albums. In the United Kingdom, the album was issued on June 16, 1967 through London Recordings, becoming the band's only charting album there (hitting number 18 on their Official Albums Chart)

== Critical reception ==
Upon original release, Happy Together received primarily positive reviews in the American press. The staff writers for Billboard magazine wrote that the Turtles "should draw top sales interest with this LP" and noted the rockier "Makin' My Mind Up" and "Person Without a Care". They singled out "Too Young to Be One" for the "fine, smooth treatment". The reviewer for Cash Box wrote that the album is a "passel of rock outings" and singled out the title track, "Makin' My Mind Up" and "Person Without a Care". They end the review with a statement that the band "has a hit sound working on the LP". The album was singled out as one of the album of the week by Record World, who stated that the album should have no issue reaching the top of the charts.

== Track listing ==
Songwriting credits according to the original 1967 White Whale Records release of the album. Track lengths adapted from the 1993 Sundazed Music reissue of Happy Together.

Side one
No.	Title	Writer(s)	Length
1.	"Makin' My Mind Up"	Jack Dalton; Gary Montgomery	2:16
2.	"Guide for the Married Man"	John Williams; Leslie Bricusse	2:42
3.	"Think I'll Run Away"	Howard Kaylan; Mark Volman	2:29
4.	"The Walking Song"	Kaylan; Al Nichol	2:42
5.	"Me About You"	Garry Bonner; Alan Gordon	2:30
6.	"Happy Together"	Bonner; Gordon	2:55
Total length:			15:34

Side two
No.	Title	Writer(s)	Length
1.	"She'd Rather Be with Me"	Bonner; Gordon	2:19
2.	"Too Young to Be One"	Eric Eisner	1:59
3.	"Person Without a Care"	Nichol	2:22
4.	"Like the Seasons"	Warren Zevon	1:54
5.	"Rugs of Woods & Flowers"	Kaylan; Nichol	3:04
Total length:			11:38

The Sundazed CD edition adds 3 bonus cuts: "She's My Girl", "You Know What I Mean", and "Is It Any Wonder"

== Personnel ==
Personnel according to the 1993 Sundazed Music reissue of Happy Together and the 2002 compilation Solid Zink, unless otherwise noted.

The Turtles

- Howard Kaylan – vocals, keyboards (6)
- Mark Volman – vocals and special effects
- Al Nichol – lead guitar, keyboards (6) and vocals
- Jim Tucker – rhythm guitar, backing vocals (6)
- John Barbata – drums
- Jim Pons – bass guitar, vocals (2–5, 7–9, 11)
- Chuck Portz – bass guitar (1)
- Chip Douglas – bass guitar, arrangement, backing vocals (6)

Technical personnel

- Joe Wissert – producer (2–9, 11)
- Bones Howe – producer, engineer (1, 10)
- Armin Steiner – engineer
- Guy Webster – photography
- Tom Wilkes – graphic design
- Bruce Botnick – engineer

Session musicians

- Warren Zevon – guitar
- Leonard Malarsky – violin
- Jesse Ehrlich – cello
- Joseph Saxon – cello
- Bob Thompson – arrangements (10)
- Larry Knechtel – bass guitar (10)
- Hal Blaine – drums
- John Audino – trumpet
- Jules Chaikin – trumpet
- Ray Triscari – trumpet
- Bob Edmondson – trombone
- Art Pepper – alto saxophone

== Charts and certifications ==
=== Weekly charts ===
Weekly chart performance for Happy Together
Chart (1967–1968)	Peak position
Canadian RPM Top LPs	12
Finnish Soumen virallinen Albums	15
UK Record Retailer LPs Chart	18
US Billboard 200	25
US Cash Box Top 100 LPs	15
US Record World 100 Top LPs	15

=== Certifications ===
Region	Certification	Certified units/sales
United States (RIAA)	Gold	500,000^{^}
^{^} Shipments figures based on certification alone.
