= The Turtles =

American rock band

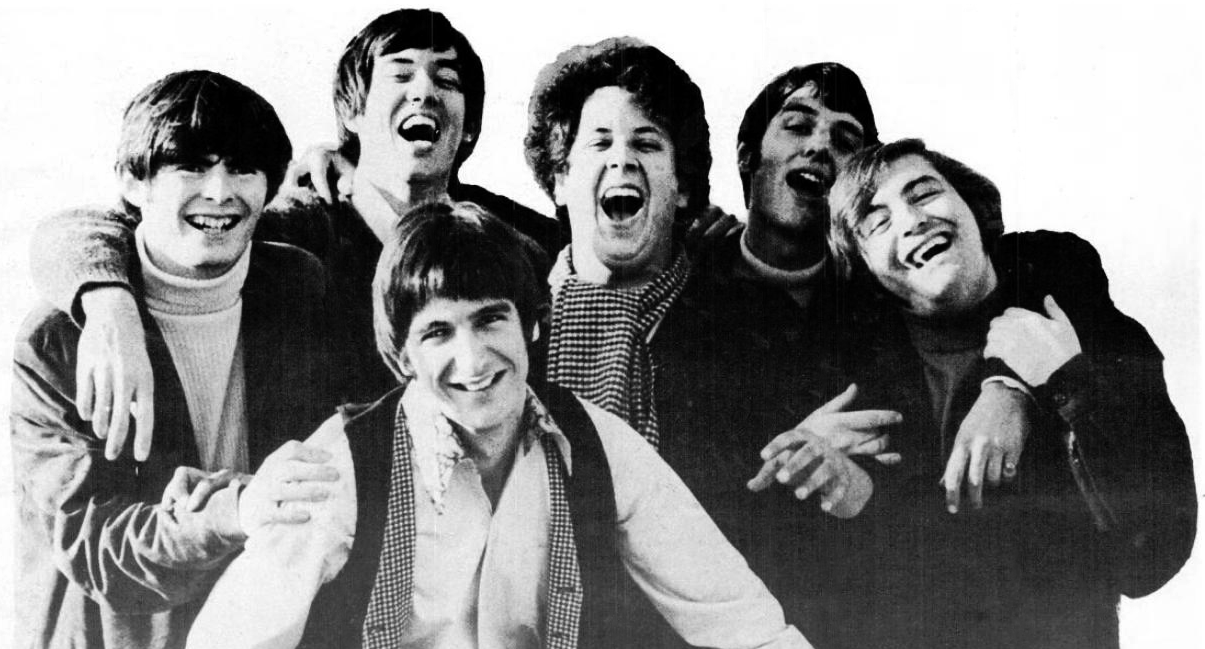
- The Turtles in 1967; From left: Al Nichol, Chip Douglas, Johnny Barbata, Mark Volman, Jim Tucker, Howard Kaylan

Background information
- Also known as: The Nightriders (1963); The Crossfires (1963–1965); The Turtles featuring Flo and Eddie (1983–2018)
- Origin: Los Angeles, California, U.S.
- Genres: Pop rock; folk rock; sunshine pop; psychedelic pop
- Works: The Turtles discography
- Years active: 1965–1970; 1983–2025
- Labels: White Whale, Sundazed Music
- Spinoffs: Flo & Eddie
- Past members: Howard Kaylan; Mark Volman; Al Nichol; Jim Tucker; Chuck Portz; Don Murray; Joel Larson; Johnny Barbata; Chip Douglas; Jim Pons; John Seiter; Ron Dante
- Website: theturtles.com

The Turtles were an American rock band formed in Los Angeles, California, in 1965. The band achieved several Top 40 hits throughout the latter half of the 1960s, including "It Ain't Me Babe" (1965), "You Baby" (1966), "Happy Together" (1967), "She'd Rather Be with Me" (1967), "Elenore" (1968), and "You Showed Me" (1969), with "Happy Together" reaching number one on the Billboard Hot 100.

The group originally consisted of lead vocalist Howard Kaylan, backing vocalist Mark Volman, lead guitarist Al Nichol, rhythm guitarist Jim Tucker, bassist Chuck Portz, and drummer Don Murray, with subsequent members being bassists Chip Douglas and Jim Pons, and drummers Joel Larson, Johnny Barbata, and John Seiter.

As the Turtles' commercial success waned by the end of the 1960s, they became plagued with management problems, lawsuits and conflicts with their label, White Whale Records, leading the group to break up in 1970. Kaylan and Volman (alongside Pons) then joined Frank Zappa's band, the Mothers of Invention, where, for contractual reasons, they performed under the name Flo & Eddie (Volman as "Flo", Kaylan as "Eddie"). After leaving Zappa at the end of 1971, Kaylan and Volman continued to perform under the Flo & Eddie name, becoming popular as a comedy rock act, and also went on to long-lasting success as session musicians for artists such as John Lennon, T. Rex, Bruce Springsteen, and Alice Cooper. In 1983, Kaylan and Volman began touring as The Turtles featuring Flo & Eddie. Kaylan ceased touring in 2018, while Volman continued to tour with the Turtles until his death in September 2025, with Ron Dante (previously of The Archies) replacing Kaylan.

== History ==
=== 1963–1966: Formation, initial success and first personnel changes ===
==== The Nightriders, the Crossfires and the Tyrtles ====
In early 1963, New Yorker Howard Kaylan and Californian Mark Volman attended the same school, Westchester High in Los Angeles (Kaylan had moved from New York City as a child). The two sang in the school's a cappella choir, where Volman soon heard about Kaylan's instrumental surf music band, the Nightriders, which included Kaylan on saxophone and choir members Al Nichol on lead guitar, Don Murray on drums and Chuck Portz on bass. Volman joined the group as a saxophonist, just before the group changed its name to the Crossfires in the same year. After high school graduation, the band continued on while its members attended area colleges, picking up rhythm guitarist Jim Tucker as a sixth member along the way.

They released a single, "Dr. Jekyll & Mr. Hyde" b/w "Fiberglass Jungle", on the local "Capco Records" label, eventually signing with newly formed White Whale Records. Adhering to the prevailing musical trend, the group rebranded itself in 1963: with the help of KRLA and KFWB DJ and club owner Reb Foster, the Crossfires signed as a folk rock band under the name The Tyrtles, an intentionally stylized misspelling inspired by the Byrds and the Beatles. However, the trendy spelling did not survive long, and they had to name themselves The Turtles.

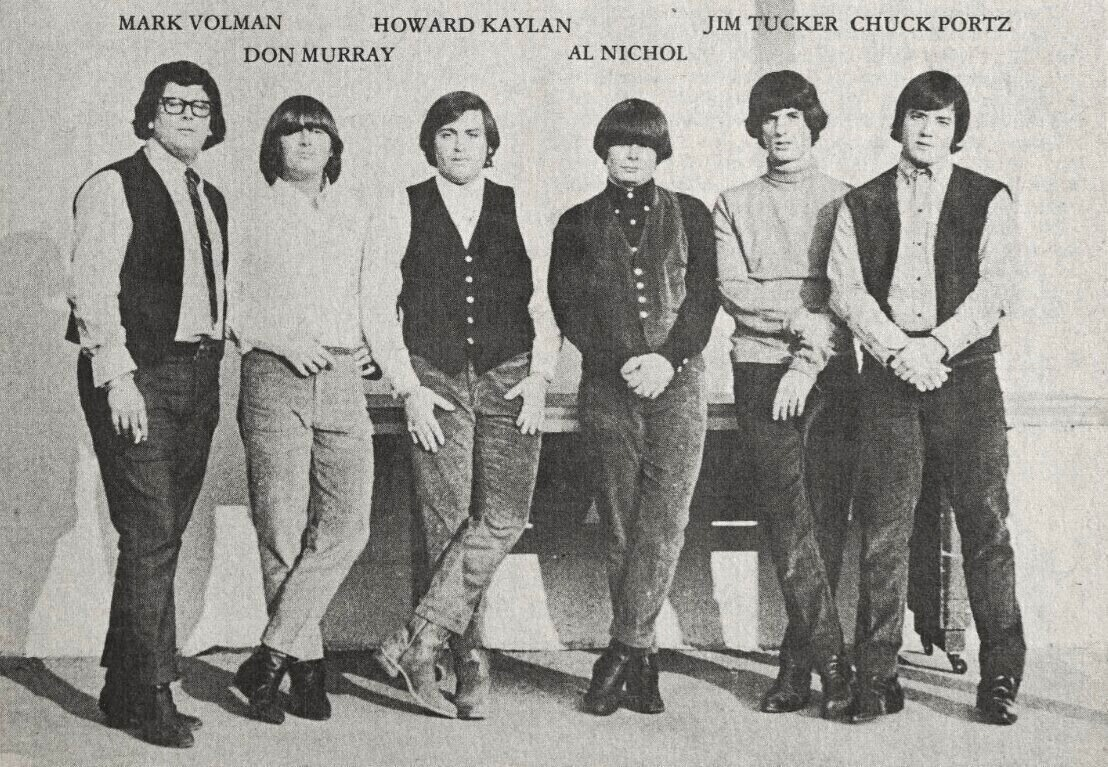
The founding lineup of The Turtles

Because of the stylistic change from "Surf music" to "Folk rock", Kaylan and Volman dropped the saxophones to become the band's vocalists. Kaylan became the group's lead singer and keyboardist (although he would give up most of the keyboard parts to Nichol in their hits). Volman began to harmonize with Kaylan's lead singing, becoming a third guitarist as well as a percussionist for the band.

==== "It Ain't Me Babe" and "You Baby" ====
As with the Byrds, the Turtles achieved breakthrough success with a rendition of a Bob Dylan song. "It Ain't Me Babe" reached the Billboard Top 10 in the late summer of 1965, and was the title track of the band's first album. "Let Me Be", their second single, reached the Top 30, and "You Baby" charted in the Top 20 in early 1966. "You Baby", with its intricate vocal harmonies and upbeat tempo, was influential in the band's sound as it departed from the political, Byrds-type folk rock; the band's new sound ranged from chamber pop to straightforward pop music.

You Baby, the band's second album, failed to reach Billboard's Top LPs chart, and of several singles released in 1966, "Grim Reaper of Love" and "Can I Get to Know You Better" barely entered the Billboard Hot 100. One single, the tough "Outside Chance", written by Warren Zevon, did not chart. In 1966, the Turtles made an appearance in Universal's film Out of Sight, singing "She'll Come Back" on screen.

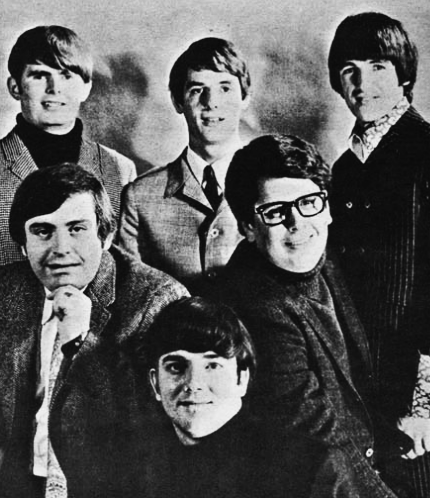
The band in 1966. Top: Al Nichol, Jim Tucker, John Barbata. Middle: Howard Kaylan, Mark Volman. Bottom: Chuck Portz.

In early 1966, drummer Don Murray and bassist Chuck Portz quit the group. Murray was replaced by Joel Larson for a few months, before John Barbata became the band's new drummer in late 1966. Portz was replaced by Chip Douglas on bass.

=== 1966–1968: Peak years ===
==== "Happy Together" ====
"Happy Together", the first of several key Turtles singles co-written by Garry Bonner and Alan Gordon, had been rejected by countless performers, but became the group's biggest hit and their signature song and signaled a turning point for both the Turtles and for Chip Douglas, who provided the arrangement. The single replaced the Beatles' "Penny Lane" at number one on the Billboard Hot 100 in the spring of 1967. The Turtles' only No. 1 remained there for three weeks. An album of the same name followed and peaked at No. 25. "Happy Together" reached No. 12 on the UK Singles Chart. This same year saw the Turtles performing the title song (music by John Williams with lyric by Leslie Bricusse) for the Twentieth Century-Fox bedroom farce A Guide for the Married Man.

Impressed by Chip Douglas's studio arrangements, Michael Nesmith approached him after a Turtles show at the Whisky a Go Go and invited him to become the Monkees' producer as that band wanted to break out of their "manufactured" studio mold. Douglas accepted and left the Turtles, producing the Monkees' next three albums: Headquarters; Pisces, Aquarius, Capricorn & Jones Ltd. (both 1967); and The Birds, the Bees & the Monkees (1968), the last of which he co-produced with the band. Meanwhile, the Turtles continued with new bassist Jim Pons replacing Douglas.

==== "She'd Rather Be with Me", "You Know What I Mean" and "She's My Girl" ====
Other hits, all written by Gordon/Bonner, followed "Happy Together", making 1967 a lucrative year for the Turtles. A follow-up, the brassy "She'd Rather Be with Me", reached No. 3 on the US charts in late spring and actually out-charted "Happy Together" overseas, reaching No. 4 in the UK. Two successive Top 15 songs followed: "You Know What I Mean" and "She's My Girl". Both 45s showed a psychedelic side in the band's style. During that year, the band released two albums, Happy Together and Golden Hits, the former reaching the Top 30 and the latter reaching the Top 10. The similar album covers for Golden Hits and its 1970 companion More Golden Hits were designed by Dean Torrence of Jan & Dean.

By the end of 1967 the band were reduced to a five-piece, when rhythm guitarist Jim Tucker departed, citing the pressure of touring and recording new material. He moved to Grass Valley, California where he became an electrical contractor. He has denied that he left the band because John Lennon was rude to him, as Kaylan later suggested in his 2003 film My Dinner with Jimi.

==== The Turtles Present the Battle of the Bands ====
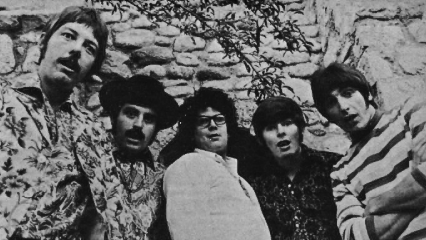
The band in 1968. From left: Jim Pons, Howard Kaylan, Mark Volman, Al Nichol, John Barbata.

"Sound Asleep" and "The Story of Rock and Roll", the first two singles in 1968, stalled somewhere in the middle of the Top 100. The band's fortunes changed when former member Chip Douglas returned to work with them as a producer. Late in 1968 the band released a concept album called The Turtles Present the Battle of the Bands, in which the group pretended to be 11 different bands (with fanciful names including the Bigg Brothers, Nature's Children, the US Teens featuring Raoul, and the Fabulous Dawgs), each with a song in a different genre. The album yielded two singles: "Elenore" and "You Showed Me", both peaking at No. 6. "Elenore" also reached No. 7 in the UK chart. Although both singles were successful, they did not help to boost the album's sales, which peaked at No. 128 on the Billboard Pop Albums. The 1969 hit "You Showed Me" had been written by the Byrds' Gene Clark and Roger (then Jim) McGuinn in 1964. It was their last Top 10 single. Television appearances included a February 1968 spot on The Mike Douglas Show, to which they returned in April 1969. 1969 saw the band undergo another personnel change, with drummer John Barbata being replaced by John Seiter.

=== 1969–1970: Commercial waning and break-up ===
==== Turtle Soup ====
Towards the end of 1969, the group released its next album, Turtle Soup, a critically well-received LP produced by Ray Davies of the Kinks. Inspired by the 1968 concept album The Kinks Are the Village Green Preservation Society, this was Davies's only released production work for another band (but Davies had previously produced demo recordings for the Iveys). Notable tracks include "Somewhere Friday Nite" and "Love in the City". In spite of Turtle Soup's positive reception from the music press, its commercial success was marginal, and the band began to disintegrate.

==== Conflicts with White Whale and disintegration ====
Long disillusioned with their record label and its growing financial problems by this time, Kaylan and Volman resisted White Whale's efforts to turn the Turtles into something approaching an assembly-line pop act, like the early Monkees. The label apparently encouraged Kaylan and Volman to fire the rest of the band, tour with hired musicians and make records by adding their vocals to backing tracks recorded by Memphis session players. Such pressure convinced the band to record a single called "Who Would Ever Think That I Would Marry Margaret?", which they disowned after its release.

The Turtles wound down their career in 1970 with More Golden Hits, a second compilation album, and Wooden Head, a B-sides and rarities album. With the demise of the Turtles, White Whale Records lost its biggest moneymaker, had few commercially viable bands, and soon ceased operations.

=== Post-Turtles ===
==== 1970s ====
In mid-1970, Kaylan and Volman joined Frank Zappa's band the Mothers of Invention, with Pons also joining in early 1971. As well as the Turtles' name, Kaylan and Volman were unable to use their real names in billings due to them being prohibited by their contract with their label White Whale Records. Because of this, Volman and Kaylan began performing under the nicknames the Phlorescent Leech & Eddie or Flo & Eddie for short. Kaylan, Volman, and Pons worked with Zappa until December 1971, when the infamous attack on Zappa at the Rainbow Theatre in London left him no choice but to cease touring for a while. During their time together the former Turtles appeared on several Zappa albums, as well as starring in his 1971 film 200 Motels. Volman and Kaylan then went on to make several duo albums, still using the Flo & Eddie name.

Volman and Kaylan sang backing vocals on several recordings by the band T. Rex, including their worldwide 1971 hit "Get It On (Bang a Gong)" and the albums Electric Warrior and The Slider. When White Whale's master recordings were sold at auction in 1974, the duo won the Turtles' masters, making them the owners of their own recorded work. They promptly licensed the tracks to Sire Records, which issued them as a compilation album titled Happy Together Again. In the mid-1970s, Volman and Kaylan started their syndicated radio show titled Flo & Eddie by the Fireside, which originated from KMET in Los Angeles.

==== 1980s ====
In the 1980s, the duo began hosting their radio show on KROQ-FM in Los Angeles and WXRK in New York City and recorded soundtrack music for children's shows like the Care Bears and Strawberry Shortcake. In 1980, Flo and Eddie performed backing vocals on Alice Cooper's Flush the Fashion and sang backup on Bruce Springsteen's "Hungry Heart" from his album The River. 1982 saw the re-release of the Turtles' original albums through Rhino Records.

In 1983, they also contributed backing vocals to the self-titled debut album of British New wave band Espionage, produced by Roy Thomas Baker and released by A&M Records. Also in 1983, Howard Kaylan appeared in the comedy film Get Crazy, starring Malcolm McDowell and Daniel Stern: Kaylan played the part of Captain Cloud, a spiritual guru, leader of a caravan of time-lost hippies. In the same year, Kaylan and Volman legally regained the use of "the Turtles" name and began touring as the Turtles Featuring Flo and Eddie; instead of trying to reunite with their earlier bandmates, they began featuring sidemen who had played with different groups. In 1984, the Turtles embarked on a U.S. Happy Together tour with Gary Puckett & the Union Gap, Spanky & Our Gang and the Association.

In 1987, Kaylan and Volman appeared in a music video of their 1967 song "Happy Together" to promote the romantic comedy Making Mr. Right. That year also saw the debut of the previously unreleased Shell Shock album, as well as a new retrospective CD 20 Greatest Hits, both released by Rhino. The latter compilation was followed in 1988 with Turtle Wax: The Best of the Turtles, Vol. 2, which featured the best of their "album tracks" and previously neglected single B-sides.

The 1989 debut album by hip-hop combo De La Soul, 3 Feet High and Rising, featured a tape loop repeating the first 11–12 seconds of the Turtles song "You Showed Me" in the short album-filler skit "Transmitting Live from Mars", with some percussion and a sampled French language lesson added by De La Soul's producer Prince Paul. Kaylan and Volman sued for copyright damages in 1989, demanding $2.5 million but settling out of court in 1991 for $1.7 million. This established a legal precedent, causing the music industry to begin carefully crediting (and paying royalties for) sampled works on future rap music and other recordings in general.

==== 1990s ====
In 1991 Music Club Records released a Turtles' anthology in the United Kingdom: Happy Together: The Best of the Turtles. In 1993, Rhino Records presented Captured Live, a live album of their 1992 tour. In 1994 Sundazed Music re-released all of the Turtles' original albums, and in 1999 Varèse Sarabande released Happy Together: The Best of White Whale Records, which included many of the Turtles' singles.

Original drummer Don Murray died on March 22, 1996, at the age of 50.

==== 2000s ====
In 2002, the film Adaptation used their song "Happy Together" extensively as a device to portray the closeness of the two brothers Kaufman, both played by Nicolas Cage; this film closes with the Turtles' version over the final credit scroll and time-lapse photography.

Also the 2005 film Imagine Me & You, the title of which was taken from the first line of the song "Happy Together", used this song in its end credits. In 2009, a Turtles compilation CD titled Save the Turtles: The Turtles Greatest Hits was issued on their FloEdCo Record label and distributed by Manifesto Records.

==== 2010s ====
Starting in the summer of 2010, the Turtles Featuring Flo & Eddie toured throughout the United States as part of the Happy Together: 25th Anniversary Tour, an oldies concert series that retained the "Happy Together" moniker in subsequent years. They performed alongside other 1960s and 1970s pop stars, including Gary Puckett, Mitch Ryder, Mark Lindsay, Mark Farner, Gary Lewis, and Micky Dolenz. The 2015 tour featured the Buckinghams, the Cowsills, the Grass Roots, and the Association. In 2016, the complete output of the Turtles was reissued as two box sets, titled The Complete Original Album Collection and All the Singles. The expanded editions of the six albums contained in the former were issued separately in 2017.

In 2018, since Kaylan required heart and back surgery, he was told by his doctors to cease touring, so Ron Dante (a prolific session musician of the Archies, the Cuff Links and the Detergents fame) replaced him.

==== 2020s ====
Original rhythm guitarist Jim Tucker died on November 12, 2020, at the age of 74.

Drummer John Barbata died on May 8, 2024, at the age of 79.

Volman died after a short illness on September 5, 2025, at the age of 78.

== Personnel ==
=== Final line-up ===
- Mark Volman – backing vocals, guitar, percussion (1965–1970, 1983–2025; his death)
- Ron Dante – lead vocals, guitar (2018–2025)

=== Former members ===
- Howard Kaylan – lead vocals, keyboards, percussion (1965–1970, 1983–2018)
- Al Nichol – guitar, keyboards, backing vocals (1965–1970)
- Jim Tucker – guitar, backing vocals (1965–1967; died 2020)
- Chuck Portz – bass guitar (1965–1966)
- Don Murray – drums (1965–1966; died 1996)
- Chip Douglas – bass guitar, backing vocals (1966–1967)
- Joel Larson – drums (1966)
- John Barbata – drums, percussion (1966–1969; died 2024)
- Jim Pons – bass guitar, backing vocals (1967–1970)
- John Seiter – drums (1969–1970)

== Discography ==
- It Ain't Me Babe (1965)
- You Baby (1966)
- Happy Together (1967)
- The Turtles Present the Battle of the Bands (1968)
- Turtle Soup (1969)
