= You Know What I Mean =

Single by The Turtles
- B-side: "Rugs Of Woods & Flowers"
- Released: July 1967
- Genre: Rock
- Length: 2:03
- Label: White Whale
- Songwriters: Alan Gordon, Garry Bonner
- Producer: Joe Wissert

The Turtles singles chronology
"Guide for the Married Man" (1967)	"You Know What I Mean" (1967)	"She's My Girl" (1967)

"You Know What I Mean" is a song released by The Turtles in 1967. The song spent 11 weeks on the Billboard Hot 100 chart, peaking at No. 12, while reaching No. 6 on Canada's "RPM 100", and No. 13 on Canada's CHUM Hit Parade.

== Chart performance ==
Chart (1967)	Peak position
Canada - RPM 100	6
US Billboard Hot 100	12
Canada - CHUM Hit Parade	13
New Zealand Listener	19
Germany	40
