= She'd Rather Be with Me =

Single by the Turtles

from the album Happy Together
- B-side: "The Walking Song"
- Released: April 1967
- Genre: Rock; pop; bubblegum
- Length: 2:17
- Label: White Whale
- Songwriters: Garry Bonner, Alan Gordon
- Producer: Joe Wissert

The Turtles singles chronology
"Happy Together" (1967)	"She'd Rather Be with Me" (1967)	"Guide for the Married Man" (1967)

"She'd Rather Be with Me" is a song written by Garry Bonner and Alan Gordon and released by the Turtles in 1967. The song was the follow-up to "Happy Together".

== Lyrics and music ==
Allmusic critic Stewart Mason described "She'd Rather Be with Me" as a "big, brassy pop song" that was "probably the least ironically cheerful single the Turtles ever did." Mason describes Howard Kaylan's lead vocal as evoking "unfeigned giddiness" and comments on the "huge production" including a full orchestra and prominent cowbell.

== Chart performance ==
The song was a major international hit, and spent 11 weeks on the Billboard Hot 100 chart, peaking at No. 3, while reaching No. 1 on Record World's "100 Top Pops", No. 1 on Canada's "RPM 100", No. 1 in South Africa, No. 2 on the Cash Box Top 100, No. 3 in Denmark, and No. 3 on the Irish Singles Chart. The song also spent 15 weeks on the UK's Record Retailer chart, peaking at No. 4, making it The Turtles' biggest hit in the United Kingdom. The song was a major hit in many other nations as well.

=== Weekly chart ===
Chart (1967)	Peak position
Australia (Go-Set)	21
Australia (Modern Melbourne)	4
Belgium (Ultratop 50 Flanders)	13
Belgium (Ultratop 50 Wallonia)	18
Canada Top Singles (RPM)	1
Denmark (Danmarks Radio)	3
Israel Forces Broadcasting Network	≥3
Ireland (IRMA)	3
Netherlands (Parool Top 20)	15
Netherlands (Veronica Top 40)	21
New Zealand Listener	8
South Africa (Springbok Radio)	1
Switzerland (Pop Redaktion)	10
UK (Record Retailer)	4
US Billboard Hot 100	3
US Cash Box Top 100	2
US Record World 100 Top Pops	1
West Germany (Musikmarkt)	23

=== Year-end charts ===
Chart (1967)	Position
Canada Top Singles (RPM)	28
US Billboard Hot 100	78
US Cash Box	24
