= It Ain't Me Babe =

1964 song written and recorded by Bob Dylan

- 1964 sheet music cover

Song by Bob Dylan

from the album Another Side of Bob Dylan
- Released: August 8, 1964
- Recorded: June 9, 1964
- Studio: CBS 30th Street, New York City
- Genre: Folk
- Length: 3:33
- Label: Columbia
- Songwriter: Bob Dylan
- Producer: Tom Wilson

Bob Dylan singles chronology
"Most Likely You Go Your Way and I'll Go Mine (Live)" (1974)	"It Ain't Me Babe" (1974)	"Tangled Up in Blue" (1975)

Audio
- "It Ain't Me, Babe" on YouTube

"It Ain't Me Babe" is a song by Bob Dylan that originally appeared on his fourth album Another Side of Bob Dylan, which was released in 1964 by Columbia Records. According to music critic Oliver Trager, this song, along with others on the album, marked a departure for Dylan as he began to explore the possibilities of language and deeper levels of the human experience. Within a year of its release, the song was picked up as a single by folk rock act the Turtles and country artist Johnny Cash (who sang it as a duet with his future wife June Carter). Jan & Dean also covered the track on their Folk 'n Roll LP in 1965. As of June 2026, Dylan had performed the song in concert 1150 times. A live version from the album Before the Flood was released in 1974 but did not chart.

== Influences ==
Dylan's biographers generally agree that the song owes its inspiration to his former girlfriend Suze Rotolo. He reportedly began writing the song during his visit to Italy in 1963 while searching for Rotolo, who was studying there.

Clinton Heylin reports that a Times reporter at a May 1964 Royal Festival Hall concert where Dylan first played "It Ain't Me" took the chorus "no, no, no" as a parody of the Beatles' "yeah, yeah, yeah" in "She Loves You".

Nat Hentoff's late October 1964 New Yorker article on Dylan includes an account of Hentoff's presence on the evening in June 1964 in the CBS recording studio when Dylan recorded this and a dozen or so other songs. After some description of the recording studio and booth exchanges among Dylan, his friends, and the session's producers, Hentoff describes the moment. "Dylan," Hentoff writes, "went on to record a song about a man leaving a girl because he was not prepared to be the kind of invincible hero and all-encompassing provider she wanted." "'It ain't me you're looking for babe,' he [Dylan] sang, with finality," Hentoff writes in his piece.

== Notable renditions ==
=== Covers ===
- Dylan and Johnny Cash were admirers of each other's work. Cash recorded the song with June Carter. The song was released on Cash's 1965 album, Orange Blossom Special, and became a hit. This song was also featured in the 2005 film about Cash's life, Walk the Line, and was performed by Joaquin Phoenix and Reese Witherspoon on the film's soundtrack.
- "It Ain't Me Babe" was among many Dylan songs recorded by Joan Baez in the early years of her career. Baez's version appeared on her 1964 album Joan Baez/5, which also included "Go 'Way from My Window". Additionally, Baez's 1967 album Live in Japan contains the song. Dylan and Baez sang a duet of "It Ain't Me Babe" at the Newport Folk Festival on July 24, 1964, as can be seen in the 2007 documentary film The Other Side of the Mirror, and their October 31, 1964 performance of it may be heard on The Bootleg Series Vol. 6: Bob Dylan Live 1964, Concert at Philharmonic Hall, released in 2004.
- Kesha covered the song during the 2016 Billboard Music Awards, accompanied by Ben Folds.
- New Found Glory Covered the song on their 2007 album From the Screen to Your Stereo Part II.
- The song appears in the 2024 Dylan biopic A Complete Unknown and soundtrack, performed by actors Timothée Chalamet (Dylan) and Monica Barbaro (Baez) recreating the singers' Newport Folk Festival performance.

=== The Turtles version ===
"It Ain't Me Babe"
- Swedish single sleeve

Single by the Turtles

from the album It Ain't Me Babe
- B-side: "Almost There"
- Released: July 1965
- Recorded: June 1965
- Studio: Western Recorders, Hollywood
- Genre: Folk rock
- Length: 2:11
- Label: White Whale
- Songwriter: Bob Dylan
- Producer: Bones Howe

The Turtles singles chronology
"It Ain't Me Babe" (1965)	"Let Me Be" (1965)

Audio
- "It Ain't Me Babe" on YouTube

==== Background and recording ====
By summer 1965, the members of Los Angeles-based surf rock band the Crossfires had graduated high school and were on the brink of breaking up in the face of their future careers. In that period, the band had switched their sound towards a folk-inspired one, partly because it was more commercially viable for the times and partly because the members revered "Dylan like a God". During the early summer of 1965, Ted Feigin and Lee Lasseff formed independent record label White Whale Records, who aimed "to release as few records as possible" and only recordings in artists "they believed in". Disc jockey Red Foster saw the Crossfires perform at the Revelaire Club in Los Angeles, and promptly contacted Feigin and Lasseff, who signed to the label. They promptly re-christened the band's name to the Beatlesque name the Turtles and urged them to record something folk rock-influenced. "It Ain't Me Babe" was suggested by the Turtles lead vocalist Howard Kaylan". Additionally he also stated that Dylan saw the members of the band perform the song at the Revelaire Club and warmly gave them an enthusiastic response, urging them to record "It Ain't Me Babe" as "their [debut] single".

The Turtles' rendition of "It Ain't Me Babe" derives heavily from the sound of the contemporary rock band the Byrds (who had also recorded Dylan songs) and was recorded in a folk rock arrangement in contrast to Dylan's original folk version. The band's recording features both twelve-string guitar and tambourine, characteristic of the folk rock genre. According to Turtles' lead vocalist Howard Kaylan, their recording of the song had been inspired by the Zombies, as he enjoyed the way "they did a soft and mysterious verse" that led into a quadruple (4/4) "chorus that really kicked ass". By June 1965, White Whale had booked recording time at the Western Recorders studio in Hollywood, Los Angeles, which came to be the Turtles' first recording session under that name. In addition to "It Ain't Me Babe", the Kaylan-penned songs "Almost There" and "Wanderin' Kind" were also recorded at the session. As White Whale was a fledgling record label, they were not able to afford session musicians and thus the members of the Turtles' perform on the single. The session was produced by Bones Howe, who would come to produce the majority of the Turtles' early recordings.

==== Release and reception ====
White Whale released "It Ain't Me Babe" as both the Turtles' and the record label's debut single in the US during July 1965. This followed shortly by the release of the single in Canada by Mercury Records in August 1965, and in the UK on Pye Records in September 1965. According to Kaylan, this made them label-mates with the Kinks and that it was "thrilling to have their songs released globally". The B-side of the single was the Kaylan-penned "Almost There", which band member Mark Volman stated was almost a "parody of the Kinks".

"It Ain't Me Babe" debuted on the US Billboard Hot 100 on August 7, 1965 before peaking in the top-10 at number eight on September 18. It would spend a further 11 weeks on the charts. In the other US music trade publications Record World and Cash Box it fared similarly well, peaking at number 7 and 8 respectively. Outside of the US, the single fared the best in Canada, where it reached number three on the RPM chart, and Sweden, where it peaked at number five of the Tio i Topp chart on October 29, 1965. According to Kaylan, this national success came so fast that "they did not know what hit them", adding that the band first heard the song on the radio after which they "screamed and hugged and lost their minds". In September 1965, "It Ain't Me" became the title track of the Turtles' debut album of the same name, and it has since been featured on most of the band's compilation albums, including Golden Hits in October 1967.

Based on the Turtles' arrangement, "It Ain't Me Babe" became a folk rock standard in Los Angeles, producing covers by the likes of Nancy Sinatra, Jan and Dean and Dino, Desi & Billy. Reception of the song has generally been positive, with AllMusic critic Joseph McCombs stating it to be part of the Turtles' "important bases". On the contrary, Steve Leggett believes the Turtles' to have sounded like a "second-tier version of the Byrds" following the release of the single, as does Gracie Williams who stated that the band turned into a "glorified cover band" with the single release. Jim Beviglia of American Songwriter wrote that the band pulled off a "nice dynamic" between the contrasting verses and chorus. Kaylan has retrospectively stated that the Turtles turned "It Ain't Me Babe" from a song about regret to a song expressing anger.

==== Charts ====
Weekly chart performance for "It Ain't Me, Babe"
Chart (1965)	Peak position
Australia (Kent Music Report)	38
Canada (RPM 100)	3
France (SNEP)	44
Sweden (Kvällstoppen)	14
Sweden (Tio i Topp)	5
US (Billboard Hot 100)	8
US (Cash Box Top 100)	8
US (Record World 100 Top Pops)	7

== Personnel ==
- Bob Dylan - vocals, acoustic guitar, harmonica
