= You Baby (song) =

Single by the Turtles

from the album You Baby
- B-side: "Wanderin' Kind"
- Released: February 1966
- Genre: Rock; folk rock; pop rock; pop
- Length: 2:12
- Label: White Whale
- Songwriters: P. F. Sloan & Steve Barri
- Producer: Bones Howe

The Turtles singles chronology
"Let Me Be" (1965)	"You Baby" (1966)	"Grim Reaper of Love" (1966)

"You Baby" is a song written by P.F. Sloan and Steve Barri and was originally recorded by the Vogues in 1965, though their version was not released until 1996.

== The Turtles recording ==
A cover version was released by the Turtles in 1966. The song spent 12 weeks on the Billboard Hot 100 chart, peaking at No. 20, while reaching No. 15 on the Record World 100 Top Pops, No. 17 on the Cash Box Top 100, and No. 11 on Canada's "RPM Play Sheet". Billboard described the song as a "rocker with a surf in' sound in the vocal" and a "winner." Cash Box described it as an "easy-going, handclappin’ warm-hearted pledge of romantic devotion."

== Chart performance ==
Chart (1966)	Peak position
Canada – RPM Play Sheet	11
US Billboard Hot 100	20
US Cash Box Top 100	17
US Record World 100 Top Pops	15

== Other cover versions ==
In 1966, the song was released by the Mamas & the Papas on their debut album If You Can Believe Your Eyes and Ears.

The song was covered by Gary Lewis & the Playboys on the 1966 "Hits Again!" album.
