= Bones Howe =

American record producer and engineer (born 1933)

Dayton Burr "Bones" Howe (born March 18, 1933) is an American record producer and recording engineer who scored a string of hits in the 1960s and 1970s, often of the sunshine pop genre, starting in 1965 with the Turtles cover of Bob Dylan's "It Ain't Me Babe," and continuing with most of the hits of the 5th Dimension and the Association. With the exception of Closing Time, he produced and engineered all of Tom Waits' releases with Asylum Records, some of which are considered among the artist's best recordings. Their almost decade-long collaboration has been described as "one of the great artist-producer partnerships". Howe performed music supervision on several feature films, and was one of the first industry members to serve as both producer and engineer of the hit records on which he worked. In addition, he was occasionally credited as a musician on recordings as "Dayton Howe".

== Biography ==
=== Early life and education ===
Howe was born in Minneapolis, Minnesota and moved to Sarasota, Florida in 1941. He graduated from Sarasota High School in 1951, becoming a drummer with a dance band and a jazz quintet. He received a bachelor's degree in Electronics and Communications in 1956 from Georgia Tech.

=== Career ===
After graduation Howe decided to combine his love of music and his electronics degree by moving to Hollywood and starting a career in 1956 as an apprentice recording engineer at Radio Recorders and advancing to mixing engineer the following year, recording Elvis Presley and Jerry Lee Lewis.

In 1961 Bill Putnam hired Howe to work at United Recording, where he engineered Frank Sinatra's Sinatra Swings, Jan and Dean's Surf City and Drag City, Johnny Rivers' At the Whisky à Go Go, and the Mamas & the Papas' first three albums, including the hits "California Dreamin'" and "Monday, Monday".

After working with Juice Newton and Tom Waits, gaining 20 Gold and Platinum awards from the RIAA, Howe became interested in promoting the use of rock and pop in films. He worked as the music supervisor for films such as Back to the Future and Serial Mom.

Howe was the chief engineer for the 1967 Monterey Pop Festival concert feature film and the 1968 NBC Elvis Christmas Special.

In 1986 Howe was offered the position of Vice President (and head of the Music Department) at Columbia Pictures and was promoted to Executive Vice President in 1989 when the studio was bought by the Sony Corporation. Howe left in 1992 and returned to recording independent music and film scores.
