= White Whale Records =

American record label

White Whale Records was an American independent record label, founded in 1965 by Ted Feigin and Lee Lasseff in Los Angeles, California, and probably best known as the record label of the Turtles and a handful of one-hit wonder bands.

White Whale, in addition to releasing almost all of the Turtles' discography, also released Nino Tempo and April Stevens's single "All Strung Out (On You)", a hit single by Rene y Rene titled "Lo Mucho que ti Quiero", an album by Liz Damon's Orient Express, and the only album by Texas band the Clique. Warren Zevon was a staff songwriter for the label, and they issued some of his earliest recordings (as part of the duo Lyme and Cybele). Dobie Gray also recorded for the label, recording the first chart version of "(I Never Promised You a) Rose Garden," which later became a much bigger hit for Lynn Anderson.

Three compilations of singles from the label have been released on compact disc: Happy Together: The Very Best of White Whale Records, and two volumes of the Phantom Jukebox series, on Rev-Ola records.

== The Turtles ==
When White Whale signed the Turtles, they were known as the Crossfires, a surf music band looking to change their style, as surf music was fading. The label encouraged a name change to "The Tyrtles", in the manner of The Beatles and The Byrds. The band accepted the new name, but not the variant spelling. Relations between the label and the band were not always smooth, with White Whale pressuring the band for "more hits", then for singers Howard Kaylan and Mark Volman to fire the rest of the group, and work, instead, with hired musicians, to save money. Kaylan wrote the song "Elenore" as a humorous take on "Happy Together" (the only number-one hit for both the group and the White Whale label), which ironically became a hit itself. Volman and he also democratized the group, insisting everyone share in the writing and vocal duties, despite what the label wanted, and recorded a concept album, The Turtles Present the Battle of the Bands (on which "Elenore" was featured).

When the Turtles disbanded in the early 1970s, White Whale lost their big moneymaker; in retaliation, and to prevent Kaylan and Volman from continuing their musical careers, White Whale insisted they held the rights to not only the Turtles' name and back catalog, but also Kaylan and Volman's individual given names. Kaylan and Volman responded by moving into session work and continuing under a pseudonym, Flo and Eddie; White Whale Records, though, went out of business not long after. The label's final releases were the single "1900 Yesterday" by Liz Damon's Orient Express and a self-titled album by the same group; although both charted (the single reaching a respectable number 33), it was not enough to keep the company going. White Whale's assets were sold at auction in 1974, at which point Kaylan and Volman won the rights to the Turtles' master recordings. Kaylan and Volman did not earn the rights to their own names (or the Turtles') again until 1983.

== Anthem Records ==
Feigin and Lasseff folded White Whale Records in 1971 and created a new label called Anthem Records (not to be confused with the later Canadian label of the same name.) Anthem was initially distributed in the United States by United Artists. Two White Whale acts were transferred to Anthem (Liz Damon's Orient Express and The Dillards), and they are the only artists to have albums issued on the label. The label also provided US distribution for a single by Freddie Mercury under the alias "Larry Lurex". One of Anthem's last signings was the duo of Lindsey Buckingham and Stevie Nicks, whose Buckingham Nicks LP was released via Polydor in 1973. (Polydor issued several albums with credits to "Anthem Record Productions" after the label lost distribution with United Artists the previous year.) Anthem Records was officially dissolved that same year.

== Current ownership ==
While Flo and Eddie Inc (distributed by Manifesto Records) controls the Turtles' catalog the rest of the White Whale catalog is currently controlled by Concord Music's Craft Recordings via Varese Sarabande. Since the 1990s, several CD reissues and compilations of White Whale material have been released.

== Chart history ==
=== Billboard Top LPs Chart ===
| Catalog # | Artist | Title | Peak position | Peak date |
|---|---|---|---|---|
| White Whale WWS-7111 | Turtles, The | It Ain't Me Babe | 98 | 10/23/1965 |
| White Whale WWS-7114 | Turtles, The | Happy Together | 25 | 4/29/1967 |
| White Whale WWS-7115 | Turtles, The | Golden Hits | 7 | 11/18/1967 |
| White Whale WWS-7118 | Turtles, The | The Turtles Present the Battle of the Bands | 128 | 11/16/1968 |
| White Whale WWS-7119 | Rene and Rene | Lo Mucho Que Te Quiero | 129 | 1/11/1969 |
| White Whale WWS-7124 | Turtles, The | Turtle Soup | 117 | 11/1/1969 |
| White Whale WWS-7126 | Clique, The | Clique, The | 177 | 1/17/1970 |
| White Whale WWS-7127 | Turtles, The | More Golden Hits | 146 | 4/11/1970 |
| White Whale/Makaha MS-5003 | Liz Damon's Orient Express | Liz Damon's Orient Express | 190 | 3/6/1971 |

=== Billboard Hot 100 & Bubbling Under Charts ===
| Catalog # | Artist | Title | Peak position | Peak date |
|---|---|---|---|---|
| White Whale 222 | Turtles, The | "It Ain't Me Babe" | 8 | 9/18/1965 |
| White Whale 224 | Turtles, The | "Let Me Be" | 29 | 11/27/1965 |
| White Whale 227 | Turtles, The | "You Baby" | 20 | 3/26/1966 |
| White Whale 228 | Lyme and Cybelle | "Follow Me" | 65 | 4/16/1966 |
| White Whale 231 | Turtles, The | "Grim Reaper of Love" | 81 | 6/25/1966 |
| White Whale 236 | Nino Tempo and April Stevens | "All Strung Out" | 26 | 10/22/1966 |
| White Whale 238 | Turtles, The | "Can I Get to Know You Better" | 89 | 11/26/1966 |
| White Whale 239 | John's Children | "Smashed! Blocked!" | 102 | 12/31/1966 |
| White Whale 241 | Tempo, Nino, & April Stevens | "You'll Be Needing Me Baby" | 133 | 1/28/1967 |
| White Whale 244 | Turtles, The | "Happy Together" | 1 | 3/25/1967 |
| White Whale 246 | Tempo, Nino, & April Stevens | "My Old Flame" | 101 | 4/29/1967 |
| White Whale 249 | Turtles, The | "She'd Rather Be with Me" | 3 | 6/17/1967 |
| White Whale 252 | Nino Tempo and April Stevens | "I Can't Go On Livin' Baby Without You" | 86 | 7/29/1967 |
| White Whale 254 | Turtles, The | "You Know What I Mean" | 12 | 9/30/1967 |
| White Whale 257 | Committee, The | "California My Way" | 110 | 10/28/1967 |
| White Whale 260 | Turtles, The | "She's My Girl" | 14 | 12/23/1967 |
| White Whale 264 | Turtles, The | "Sound Asleep" | 57 | 3/30/1968 |
| White Whale 268 | Tempo, Nino, & April Stevens | "Let It Be Me" | 127 | 5/25/1968 |
| White Whale 273 | Turtles, The | "The Story of Rock and Roll" | 48 | 7/13/1968 |
| White Whale 275 | Professor Morrison's Lollipop | "You Got the Love" | 88 | 10/5/1968 |
| White Whale 276 | Turtles, The | "Elenore" | 6 | 11/2/1968 |
| White Whale 287 | Rene & Rene | "Lo Mucho Que Te Quiero (The More I Love You)" | 14 | 1/4/1969 |
| White Whale 289 | Malibu's, The | "A Broken Man" | 121 | 2/8/1969 |
| White Whale 292 | Turtles, The | "You Showed Me" | 6 | 3/1/1969 |
| White Whale 298 | Rene & Rene | "Las Costas" | 128 | 3/22/1969 |
| White Whale 300 | Gray, Dobie | "Rose Garden" | 119 | 5/31/1969 |
| White Whale 308 | Turtles, The | "You Don't Have to Walk in the Rain" | 51 | 7/12/1969 |
| White Whale 323 | Clique, The | "Sugar on Sunday" | 22 | 10/18/1969 |
| White Whale 326 | Turtles, The | "Love in the City" | 91 | 10/18/1969 |
| White Whale 333 | Clique, The | "I'll Hold Out My Hand" | 45 | 12/13/1969 |
| White Whale 334 | Turtles, The | "Lady-O" | 78 | 12/20/1969 |
| White Whale 338 | Clique, The | "Sparkle and Shine" | 100 | 2/28/1970 |
| White Whale 353 | Feather | "Friends" | 79 | 6/20/1970 |
| White Whale 355 | Turtles, The | "Eve of Destruction" | 100 | 6/27/1970 |
| White Whale 360 | Reivers, The | "Revolution in My Soul" | 112 | 9/19/1970 |
| White Whale 364 | Turtles, The | "Me About You" | 105 | 11/14/1970 |
| White Whale 368 | Liz Damon's Orient Express | "1900 Yesterday" | 33 | 2/13/1971 |

== See also ==
- List of record labels
