= Spanky and Our Gang (album) =

Studio album by Spanky and Our Gang
- Released: August 1, 1967
- Studio: Western Recorders, Hollywood, California; Olmstead Studios, New York
- Genre: Folk rock, sunshine pop
- Length: 35:01
- Label: Mercury
- Producer: Jerry Ross

Spanky and Our Gang chronology
Spanky and Our Gang (1967)	Like to Get to Know You (1968)

Spanky and Our Gang is the debut album by Spanky and Our Gang, released on August 1, 1967. The album was released by Mercury Records and included three songs that were released as singles. These were "Sunday Will Never Be the Same", their biggest hit, which reached number Number 9 on the U.S. Billboard Hot 100 chart in the summer of 1967, "Making Every Minute Count", which reached Number 31, and "Lazy Day", reaching Number 14.

"Sunday Will Never Be The Same" and "Lazy Day" both sold over one million copies. "Sunday Will Never Be the Same" was written by Terry Cashman and Gene Pistilli. In an interview, Cashman said that the song was originally written as a ballad, but the group changed it and added the vocal - 'Ba-da-da-da-da' - which turned out to be a "great hook" for the song.

== Critical reception ==
Professional ratings
Review scores
Source	Rating
Allmusic	3/5 stars

Writing for Allmusic, music critic Bruce Eder wrote of the album "The group's debut LP demonstrates what can go wrong, even with a group enjoying a trio of hit singles. Though those hits are here, the album is the least representative of what the group was about and a mixed bag for fans, presenting a trio of widely available hits, six or seven fine tracks currently unavailable elsewhere, and two musical lapses that between them account for nearly one-third of the running time."

== Track listing ==
1. "Lazy Day" (George Fischoff, Tony Powers) – 3:10
2. "(It Ain't Necessarily) Bird Avenue" (Michael P. Smith) – 2:36
3. "Ya Got Trouble (In River City)" (Meredith Willson) – 4:38
4. "Sunday Will Never Be the Same" (Terry Cashman, Eugene Pistilli) – 2:58
5. "Commercial" (Michael P. Smith) – 1:31
6. "If You Could Only Be Me" (Roger Atkins, Carl D'Errico) – 2:05
7. "Making Every Minute Count" (John Morier) – 2:35
8. "5 Definitions of Love" (Bob Dorough) – 2:21
9. "Brother, Can You Spare a Dime?" (Jay Gorney, Edgar Yipsel "Yip" Harburg) – 5:02
10. "Distance" (Ray Gilmore, Joe Renzetti) – 2:38
11. "Jet Plane" (John Denver) – 3:40
12. "Come and Open Your Eyes (Take a Look)" (Jo Mapes) – 2:18

== Personnel ==
Spanky and Our Gang

- Elaine "Spanky" McFarlane – lead vocals
- Nigel Pickering – rhythm guitar, vocals
- Paul "Oz" Bach – bass guitar, vocals
- Malcolm Hale – lead guitar, trombone, vocals
- John "The Chief" Seiter – drums

The band recorded the instrumental backing to tracks 2, 3, 5, 9, 11, and 12. Studio musicians recorded the rest.

- Jimmy Wisner, Bob Dorough, Stuart Scharf, Joe Renzetti, Spanky and Our Gang - arrangements

== See also ==
- The New Mamas and The Papas
- 27 Club
- Folk rock
