= The Boat That Rocked (soundtrack) =

Soundtrack album by Various artists
- Released: March 30, 2009
- Genre: Rock, pop, soul
- Length: 111:54
- Label: Mercury
- Producer: Eric Fellner

Pirate Radio
- The film was retitled Pirate Radio for release in North America.

The Boat That Rocked is a soundtrack album to the 2009 British film of the same title, a comedy about a fictitious British pirate radio station set in 1966. The soundtrack was released March 30, 2009 through Mercury Records as a double album featuring popular rock, pop, and soul artists of the 1960s. It also includes David Bowie's 1983 song "Let's Dance" and a 2009 cover version of "Stay with Me" performed by Duffy, with Lorraine Ellison's original 1966 version included as well. In North America, where the film was retitled Pirate Radio, the soundtrack album was released November 10, 2009 through Universal Republic. The Pirate Radio version omits four tracks that were included on The Boat That Rocked album—"Crimson and Clover" by Tommy James and the Shondells, "The Letter" by The Box Tops, "The End of the World" by Skeeter Davis, and "Hang On Sloopy" by The McCoys—and reverses the order of tracks 7 and 8 on the second disc.

== Track listing ==
=== The Boat That Rocked version ===
Disc 1
No.	Title	Writer(s)	Performer	Length
1.	"Stay with Me Baby" (originally performed by Lorraine Ellison)	Jerry Ragovoy & George David Weiss	Duffy	3:52
2.	"All Day and All of the Night"	Ray Davies	The Kinks	2:23
3.	"Elenore"	Allan Nichol, John Barbata, Howard Kaylan, Jim Pons, Mark Volman	The Turtles	2:30
4.	"Judy in Disguise (With Glasses)"	John Fred Gourrier	John Fred & His Playboy Band	2:53
5.	"Dancing in the Street"	Marvin Gaye, Ivy Joe Hunter, William "Mickey" Stevenson	Martha Reeves & the Vandellas	2:36
6.	"Wouldn't It Be Nice"	Brian Wilson, Tony Asher, Mike Love	The Beach Boys	2:23
7.	"Ooo Baby Baby"	Warren Moore, Smokey Robinson	Smokey Robinson & The Miracles	2:45
8.	"This Guy's in Love with You"	Burt Bacharach, Hal David	Herb Alpert & the Tijuana Brass	4:01
9.	"Crimson and Clover"	Tommy James, Peter Lucia Jr.	Tommy James and the Shondells	5:24
10.	"Hi Ho Silver Lining"	Scott English, Larry Weiss	Jeff Beck	2:48
11.	"I Can See for Miles"	Pete Townshend	The Who	4:07
12.	"With a Girl Like You"	Reg Presley	The Troggs	2:07
13.	"The Letter"	Wayne Carson Thompson	The Box Tops	1:54
14.	"I'm Alive"	Clint Ballard Jr.	The Hollies	2:25
15.	"Yesterday Man"	Chris Andrews	Chris Andrews	2:32
16.	"I've Been a Bad Bad Boy"	Mike Leander	Paul Jones	2:20
17.	"Silence Is Golden" (originally performed by The Four Seasons)	Bob Gaudio, Bob Crewe	The Tremeloes	3:09
18.	"The End of the World"	Arthur Kent, Sylvia Dee	Skeeter Davis	2:39
Total length:				52:48

Disc 2
No.	Title	Writer(s)	Performer	Length
1.	"Friday on My Mind"	George Young, Harry Vanda	The Easybeats	2:53
2.	"My Generation"	Pete Townshend	The Who	3:19
3.	"I Feel Free"	Pete Brown, Jack Bruce	Cream	2:54
4.	"The Wind Cries Mary"	Jimi Hendrix	The Jimi Hendrix Experience	3:21
5.	"A Whiter Shade of Pale"	Keith Reid, Gary Brooker	Procol Harum	4:00
6.	"These Arms of Mine"	Otis Redding	Otis Redding	2:33
7.	"Cleo's Mood"	Willie Woods, Autry DeWalt, Harvey Fuqua	Jr. Walker & the All Stars	2:42
8.	"The Happening"	Brian Holland, Lamont Dozier, Eddie Holland, Frank De Vol	The Supremes	2:51
9.	"She'd Rather Be with Me"	Alan Gordon, Gary Bonner	The Turtles	2:21
10.	"98.6" (originally performed by Keith)	George Fischoff, Tony Powers	The Bystanders	3:19
11.	"Sunny Afternoon"	Ray Davies	The Kinks	3:34
12.	"Father and Son"	Cat Stevens	Cat Stevens	3:42
13.	"Nights in White Satin"	Justin Hayward	The Moody Blues	4:26
14.	"You Don't Have to Say You Love Me"	Pino Donaggio, Simon Napier-Bell, Vito Pallavicini, Vicki Wickham	Dusty Springfield	2:49
15.	"Stay with Me (Baby)"	George David Weiss, Jerry Ragovoy	Lorraine Ellison	3:33
16.	"Hang On Sloopy"	Wes Farrell, Bert Russell	The McCoys	3:52
17.	"This Old Heart of Mine (Is Weak for You)"	Brian Holland, Lamont Dozier, Eddie Holland, Sylvia Moy	The Isley Brothers	2:51
18.	"Let's Dance"	David Bowie	David Bowie	4:06
Total length:				59:06

=== Pirate Radio version ===
Disc 1
No.	Title	Writer(s)	Performer	Length
1.	"Stay with Me Baby" (originally performed by Lorraine Ellison)	Walter Marks	Duffy	3:52
2.	"All Day and All of the Night"	Ray Davies	The Kinks	2:23
3.	"Elenore"	Allan Nichol, John Barbata, Howard Kaylan, Jim Pons, Mark Volman	The Turtles	2:30
4.	"Judy in Disguise (With Glasses)"	John Fred Gourrier	John Fred & His Playboy Band	2:53
5.	"Dancing in the Street"	Marvin Gaye, Ivy Joe Hunter, William "Mickey" Stevenson	Martha Reeves & the Vandellas	2:36
6.	"Wouldn't It Be Nice"	Brian Wilson, Tony Asher, Mike Love	The Beach Boys	2:23
7.	"Ooo Baby Baby"	Warren Moore, Smokey Robinson	Smokey Robinson & The Miracles	2:45
8.	"This Guy's in Love with You"	Burt Bacharach, Hal David	Herb Alpert & the Tijuana Brass	4:01
9.	"Hi Ho Silver Lining"	Scott English, Larry Weiss	Jeff Beck	2:48
10.	"I Can See for Miles"	Pete Townshend, John Entwistle, Keith Moon	The Who	4:07
11.	"With a Girl Like You"	Reg Presley	The Troggs	2:07
12.	"I'm Alive"	Clint Ballard Jr.	The Hollies	2:25
13.	"Yesterday Man"	Chris Andrews	Chris Andrews	2:32
14.	"I've Been a Bad Bad Boy"	Mike Leander	Paul Jones	2:20
15.	"Silence Is Golden" (originally performed by The Four Seasons)	Bob Gaudio, Bob Crewe	The Tremeloes	3:09
Total length:				42:51

Disc 2
No.	Title	Writer(s)	Performer	Length
1.	"Friday on My Mind"	George Young, Harry Vanda	The Easybeats	2:53
2.	"My Generation"	Pete Townshend	The Who	3:19
3.	"I Feel Free"	Pete Brown, Jack Bruce	Cream	2:54
4.	"The Wind Cries Mary"	Jimi Hendrix	The Jimi Hendrix Experience	3:21
5.	"A Whiter Shade of Pale"	Keith Reid, Gary Brooker	Procol Harum	4:00
6.	"These Arms of Mine"	Otis Redding	Otis Redding	2:33
7.	"The Happening"	Brian Holland, Lamont Dozier, Eddie Holland, Frank De Vol	The Supremes	2:51
8.	"Cleo's Mood"	Willie Woods, Autry DeWalt, Harvey Fuqua	Jr. Walker & the All Stars	2:42
9.	"She'd Rather Be with Me"	Alan Gordon, Gary Bonner	The Turtles	2:21
10.	"98.6" (originally performed by Keith)	George Fischoff, Tony Powers	The Bystanders	3:19
11.	"Sunny Afternoon"	Ray Davies	The Kinks	3:34
12.	"Father and Son"	Cat Stevens	Cat Stevens	3:42
13.	"Nights in White Satin"	Justin Hayward	The Moody Blues	4:26
14.	"You Don't Have to Say You Love Me"	Pino Donaggio, Simon Napier-Bell, Vito Pallavicini, Vicki Wickham	Dusty Springfield	2:49
15.	"Stay with Me (Baby)"	George David Weiss, Jerry Ragovoy	Lorraine Ellison	3:33
16.	"This Old Heart of Mine (Is Weak for You)"	Brian Holland, Lamont Dozier, Eddie Holland, Sylvia Moy	The Isley Brothers	2:51
17.	"Let's Dance"	David Bowie	David Bowie	4:06
Total length:				55:14

== Charts ==
Chart (2009)	Peak position
Australian ARIA Albums Chart	3
New Zealand RIANZ Albums Chart	3

== Certifications ==
Region	Certification	Certified units/sales
Australia (ARIA)	Platinum	70,000^{^}
^{^} Shipments figures based on certification alone.
