= Spanky McFarlane =

American singer (born 1942)

Elaine "Spanky" McFarlane
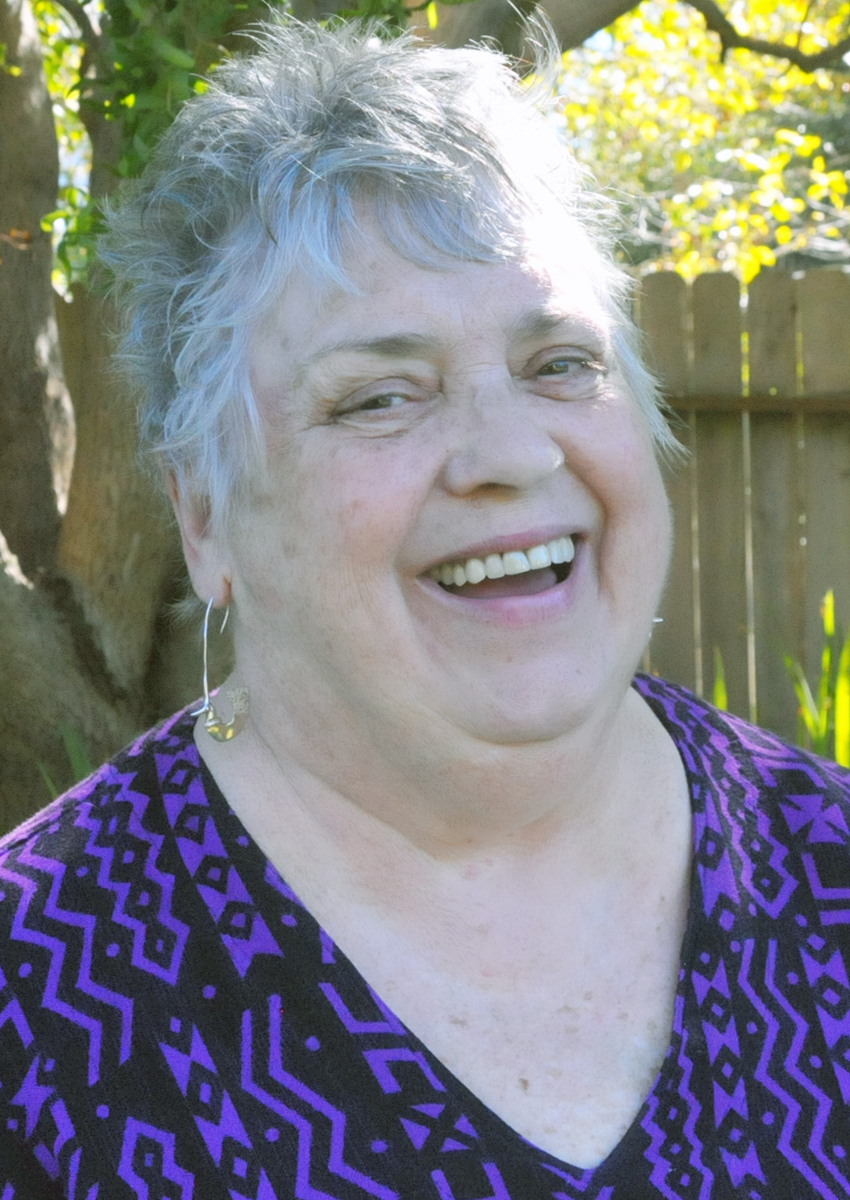
- McFarlane in 2015

Background information
- Born: Elaine McFarlane; June 19, 1942 (age 84)
- Genres: Pop; folk
- Occupation: Singer
- Years active: 1966–present

Elaine "Spanky" McFarlane (born June 19, 1942) is an American singer best known for fronting the vocal group Spanky and Our Gang in the late 1960s. She was nicknamed "The Queen of Sunshine Pop."

== Early years ==
In 1959, McFarlane arrived in Chicago from Bloomington, Illinois. She started performing with such jazz greats as Lil Hardin Armstrong, Earl Hines, and Little Brother Montgomery, working the jazz clubs.

She soon got involved with the burgeoning folk crowd, and formed a trio with Roger McGuinn and Guy Guilbert called the Old Town Trio, playing the local bars and coffee houses for a summer.

In 1962, she joined the New Wine Singers.

Fellow singer Arnie Lanza nicknamed her Spanky because of the similarity of her last name, McFarlane, to the last name of child actor George McFarland, who played Spanky in the Our Gang comedies. The nickname stuck.

The New Wine Singers performed folk songs the first half of their set, then dropped the guitars and banjo, picked up a trombone, cornet, drums, and piano, and closed the set with Dixieland jazz. They made their only folk LP on Vee-Jay Records, titled The New Wine Singers at the Chicago Opera House.

McFarlane joined a jazz-based singing group called the Jamie Lyn Trio, touring the country and working the Playboy Club circuit.

In Chicago, in 1965, she formed Spanky and Our Gang with Nigel Pickering and Oz Bach, with fellow New Wine Singers musician Malcolm Hale joining later. After a few weeks of rehearsal, they debuted as the opening act at Mother Blues nightclub.

== Mainstream success ==
The band had major hits with "Sunday Will Never Be the Same", "Lazy Day", "Sunday Mornin'," and "Like to Get to Know You".

McFarlane resisted being labeled a bubblegum pop artist:

"It wasn't a label I wanted or particularly aspired to. I do see how a song like 'Lazy Day' could be considered bubblegum, so then I came up with songs like 'Like to Get to Know You' and 'Give a Damn' which could not be considered bubblegum in any way, shape, or form."

On October 31, 1968, the group's lead guitarist Malcolm Hale died in his sleep in the third-floor apartment of the same building where Chicago's famed Earl of Old Town folk bar resided, leading the band to disband in early 1969. Thereafter, McFarlane and her husband, road manager Charly Galvin, prepared an album called Spanky's Greatest Hits.

== Later years ==
McFarlane had later success as a solo artist. She became a member of The New Mamas & the Papas, singing Cass Elliot's vocal parts.

She also began an acting career, playing a barmaid in the 1975 film Moonrunners and appearing as Bloody Mary in the Ferndale Repertory Theatre's production of South Pacific.

She reinstated Spanky and Our Gang in the 2000s, playing with musicians who had played with Steely Dan, Bobbie Gentry, and others.

"We just adore each other and it shows. It's not like I'm trying to make a new career for myself, I just want to have fun and be with my pals."
