= Like to Get to Know You (album) =

Studio album by Spanky and Our Gang
- Released: April 1968
- Studio: Western Recorders, Hollywood, California; Impact Sound Studios, New York City; Universal Recording Studio, Chicago
- Genre: Folk rock, jazz pop, psychedelic rock, garage rock, sunshine pop
- Length: 32:34
- Label: Mercury
- Producer: Bob Dorough, Stuart Scharf

Spanky and Our Gang chronology
Spanky & Our Gang (1967)	Like to Get to Know You (1968)	Without Rhythm or Reason (Anything You Choose) (1969)

Like to Get to Know You is the second studio album by Spanky and Our Gang, released in 1968. It is the first of their albums to exhibit their signature sound, partially owing to it being produced by two different people than their debut album.

== Reception ==
Professional ratings
Review scores
Source	Rating
Allmusic	4/5 stars
Rolling Stone	(positive)

Writing for Allmusic, music critic Bruce Eder wrote the album "was harder-rocking, bluesier, and more inventive in its folk stylings than anything on their debut album. The mix of sounds was actually quite startling in its own time and is engaging even 30 some years later."

== Track listing ==
1. "The Swingin' Gate" (John Ferrell, Geoffrey Meyers) lead vocals: Malcolm Hale, John Seiter, Spanky McFarlane – 2:14
2. "Prescription for the Blues" (Little Brother Montgomery, Red Saunders) lead vocals: Spanky McFarlane – 3:07
3. "Three Ways from Tomorrow" (Lefty Baker) lead vocals: Lefty Baker– 3:25
4. "My Bill" (Bob Dorough, Daniel Greenburg, Monte Ghertler) – 2:27
5. "Sunday Mornin'" (Margo Guryan) lead vocals: Spanky McFarlane – 3:54
6. "Echoes (Everybody's Talkin')" (Fred Neil) lead vocals: Malcolm Hale – 3:10
7. "Suzanne" (Leonard Cohen) – 3:47
8. "Stuperflabbergasted" (F. Summers, R. Bruce, Carlos Bernal) lead vocals: Lefty Baker– 1:10
9. "Like to Get to Know You" (Stuart Scharf) lead vocals: Lefty Baker, Malcolm Hale, Kenny Hodges, Spanky McFarlane – 2:15
10. "Chick-a-Ding-Ding" (Stuart Scharf) lead vocals: Nigel Pickering, Spanky McFarlane – 2:23
11. "Stardust" (Hoagy Carmichael, Mitchell Parish) lead vocals: Spanky McFarlane, Nigel Pickering – 3:32
12. "Coda (Like to Get to Know You)" (Stuart Scharf) lead vocals: Lefty Baker, Malcolm Hale – 0:59

== Personnel ==
Spanky and Our Gang

- Spanky McFarlane - vocals
- Malcolm Hale - lead guitar, trombone, vocals
- Lefty Baker - lead guitar, banjo, vocals
- Nigel Pickering - rhythm guitar, vocals
- Kenny Hodges - bass, vocals
- John Seiter - drums, vocals

The band recorded the instrumental tracks for "Three Ways from Tomorrow," "Suzanne," and "Stuperflabbergasted." Studio musicians recorded the rest

- Mike Deasy - guitar
- Walter Raim - 12-string guitar
- Chet Amsterdam, Larry Knechtel, Richard Davis - bass
- Red Rhodes - steel guitar
- Artie Schroeck - organ, piano
- Bill LaVorgna, Donald MacDonald, Hal Blaine - drums
- Lee Katzman - trumpet
