= Spanky (disambiguation) =

Spanky McFarland (1928–1993) was an American child actor in the Our Gang (Little Rascals) comedies.

Spanky may refer also to:

== People ==
=== Nickname ===
- Chalmers Alford (1955–2008), American guitarist
- Spanky Davis (1943–2014), American jazz trumpeter
- Spanky DeBrest (1937–1973), American jazz bassist
- Frank Dyson (1931–1979), British rugby league footballer
- Michael Fincke (born 1967), NASA astronaut
- Brian Kendrick (born 1979), American professional wrestler who wrestled as Spanky
- Ed Kirkpatrick (1944–2010), American Major League Baseball utility player
- Kevin Long (skateboarder) (born 1984), American professional skateboarder
- Spanky Manikan (1942–2018), Filipino actor
- George "Spanky" McCurdy (born 1981), American drummer
- Elaine "Spanky" McFarlane, vocalist of Spanky and Our Gang, an American 1960s folk-rock band
- Michael Russell (tennis) (born 1978), American tennis player
- Earl Smith Jr. (1965–2016), American acid house musician
- Al Spangler (born 1933), American retired Major League Baseball player
- Donald Trump (born 1946), related to allegations made by porn star Stormy Daniels
- Spanky Wilson (born c. 1947), American vocalist

=== Given name ===
- Spanky Spangler (born 1947), American daredevil

== Other ==
- Spanky (film), an Our Gang short film
- Spanky, a 1994 novel by Christopher Fowler
- Spanky Ham, a character on the Comedy Central program Drawn Together

== See also ==
- Spanky and Our Gang (disambiguation)
