= Spanky and Our Gang (disambiguation) =

Spanky and Our Gang was a 1960s American pop band.

Spanky and Our Gang may also refer to:

- Spanky and Our Gang (album), a 1967 album by the band
- Spanky & Our Gang Live, a 1970 album by the band
- Spanky of Our Gang
