= Ben Lester (album) =

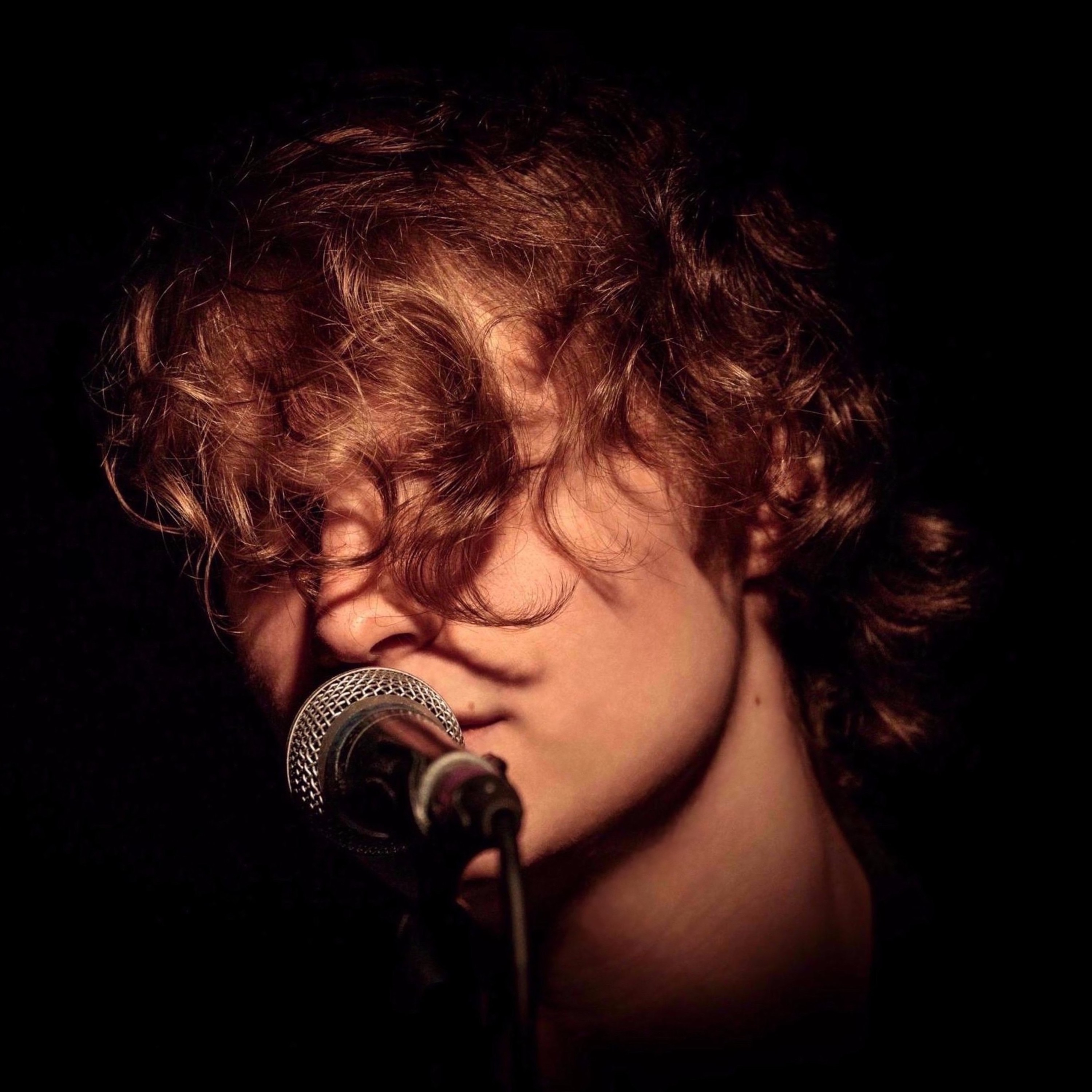

Studio album by Ben Lester
- Released: 5 September 2025
- Recorded: March 2017 - January 2020
- Genre: Chamber pop
- Length: 34:20
- Label: Mayfield Records
- Producer: Ben Lester

Ben Lester is the self-titled debut album by English singer-songwriter Ben Lester. Recorded over three years between 2017 and 2020, the album was shelved for five years before eventually being released on 5 September 2025 by Mayfield Records. It was received with critical acclaim, with reviewers praising its "intricate melodies", "ambitious arrangements", "evocative lyrics", and "emotional detail".

== Track listing ==
Side one
| No. | Title | Writer(s) | Length |
|---|---|---|---|
| 1. | "California Shake" | Margo Guryan | 2:48 |
| 2. | "The Moment" | Ben Lester | 3:08 |
| 3. | "Things Must Change" | Ben Lester | 3:09 |
| 4. | "Sunrise" | Ben Lester | 2:40 |
| 5. | "Incandescence" | Ben Lester | 3:00 |
| 6. | "Long Ago" | Ben Lester | 2:16 |
| Total length: | | | 17:03 |

Side two
| No. | Title | Writer(s) | Length |
|---|---|---|---|
| 1. | "Dreaming" | Ben Lester | 2:48 |
| 2. | "In the Night" | Ben Lester | 3:22 |
| 3. | "For a While" | Ben Lester | 2:35 |
| 4. | "Hiraeth" | Ben Lester | 2:14 |
| 5. | "My Mind" | Ben Lester | 2:10 |
| 6. | "Back to Stay" | Ben Lester | 2:18 |
| 7. | "Until the Next Time" | Ben Lester | 1:50 |
| Total length: | | | 17:17 34:20 |
