= Yummy, Yummy, Yummy (album) =

Studio album by Julie London
- Released: 1969
- Recorded: August–September 1968
- Label: Liberty
- Producer: Tommy Oliver

Julie London chronology
Easy Does It (1968)	Yummy, Yummy, Yummy (1969)

Yummy, Yummy, Yummy is a 1969 album by Julie London. It was London's final studio album, and her only one to feature covers of contemporary songs by popular 1960s acts (Beatles, Doors, Bob Dylan). It was produced by Tommy Oliver, who was also the arranger and conductor. The album was released under catalog number LST 7609.

The album was re-released on CD on June 21, 2005, by Collector's Choice Music.

== Track listing ==
No.	Title	Writer(s)	Length
1.	"Stoned Soul Picnic"	Laura Nyro	3:30
2.	"Like to Get to Know You"	Stuart Scharf	2:48
3.	"Light My Fire"	The Doors (John Densmore, Robbie Krieger, Ray Manzarek, Jim Morrison)	3:22
4.	"It's Nice to Be with You"	Jerry Goldstein	2:55
5.	"Sunday Mornin'"	Margo Guryan	3:08
6.	"Hushabye Mountain"	Robert B. Sherman, Richard M. Sherman	3:06
7.	"Mighty Quinn (Quinn, The Eskimo)"	Bob Dylan	1:59
8.	"Come to Me Slowly"	Margo Guryan	2:32
9.	"And I Love Him"	John Lennon, Paul McCartney	2:06
10.	"Without Him"	Harry Nilsson	2:53
11.	"Yummy, Yummy, Yummy"	Arthur Resnick, Joey Levine	2:58
12.	"Louie Louie"	Richard Berry	2:40

== Selected personnel ==
As listed in Go Slow: The Life of Julie London.

- Julie London - vocals
- Bob Knight - trombone
- Bill Perkins - reeds
- Jim Horn - reeds
- Michel Rubini - piano
- Al Casey - guitar
- Neil LeVang - guitar
- Mike Deasy - guitar
- Lou Morell - guitar
- Lyle Ritz - electric bass
- John Guerin - drums
- Hal Blaine - drums
- Gary Coleman - percussion
- Dale Anderson - percussion
- Tommy Oliver - producer, arranger, conductor
