= Nigel Pickering =

American musician (1929–2011)

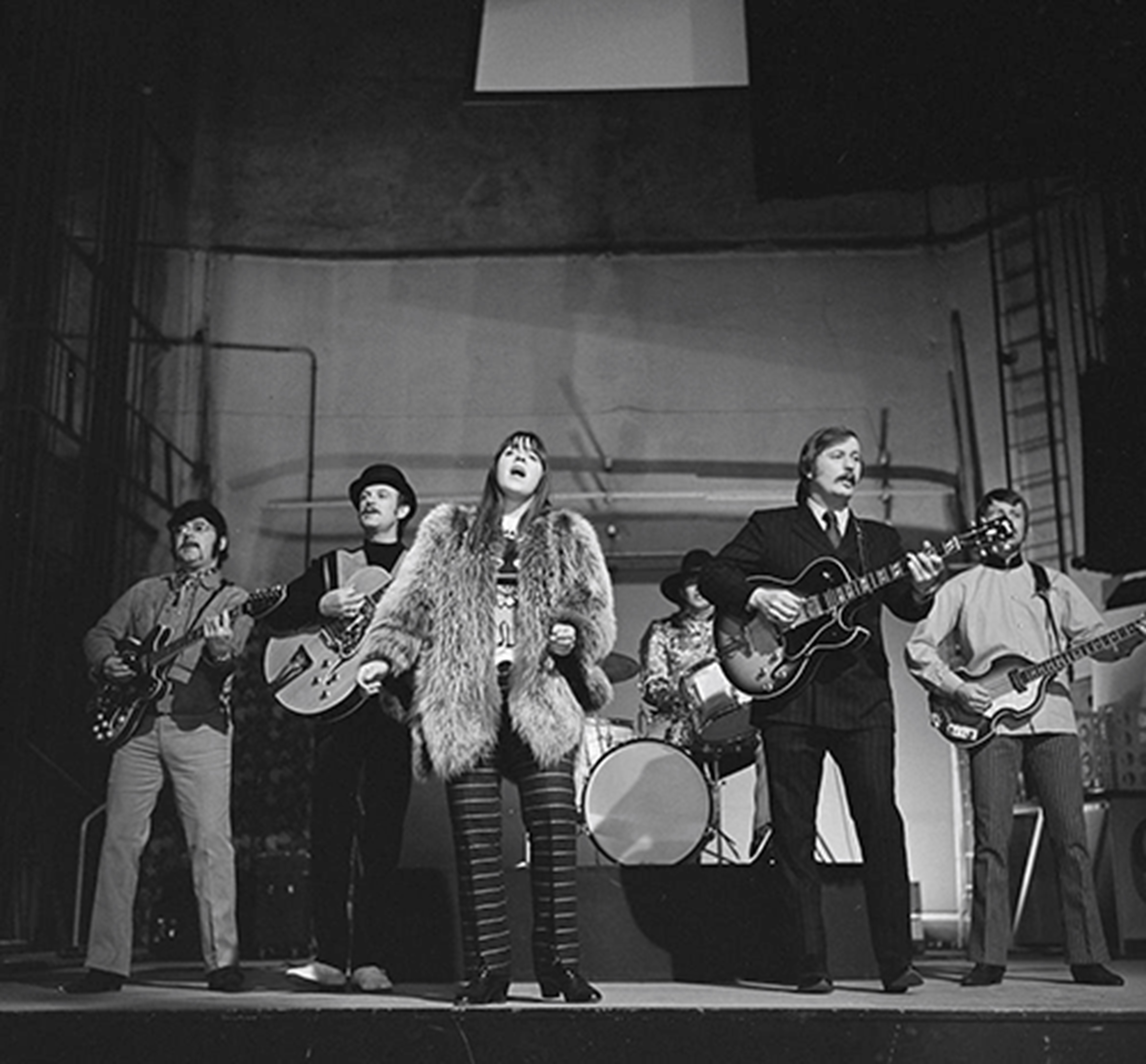
- Nigel (2nd from left) performing with Spanky And Our Gang on the Dutch television show Fenklup on April 5 1968

Background information
- Born: Fredy Ray Pickering; June 15, 1929; Pontiac, Missouri, United States
- Origin: Chicago, Illinois
- Died: May 5, 2011 (aged 81) St. Augustine, Florida, United States
- Genres: Folk
- Occupation: Musician
- Instruments: Guitar, vocals
- Years active: 1950s-2011
- Formerly of: Spanky And Our Gang

Nigel Pickering (born Fredy Ray Pickering; June 15, 1929 – May 5, 2011) was an American folk rock musician, who co-founded and was a songwriter for Spanky And Our Gang.

== Biography ==
Nigel Pickering was born Fredy Ray Pickering in 1929 in Pontiac, Missouri. Pickering began his music career playing guitar on the radio with a Milwaukee group called "The Westernaires" in the mid-1950s. Their show was called "Ranch House Roundup" and he was the character "Ranger Tom."

Prior to being in Our Gang, Nigel was a member of the folk trio The Folksters, who appeared on two 1962 episodes of The Tonight Show With Johnny Carson (November 19 and 26). The trio included Kenny Hodges, who later played in Spanky And Our Gang. Pickering first met Spanky McFarlane and Oz Bach at a Hurricane party in Chicago, Illinois, in 1965. The three, along with Malcom Hale and John Seiter, formed Spanky And Our Gang, best known for songs such as Lazy Day, Sunday Will Never Be The Same, and Like To Get To Know You that were produced between 1967 and 1969. The group came to an abrupt end in 1969, following the death of Malcom Hale on October 30, 1968.

After the dissolution of Our Gang, Pickering continued to perform as a solo act in clubs. He stopped playing guitar in the late 2000s due to arthritis, but continued to sing. After fighting liver cancer, he died on May 5, 2011, aged 81 in Saint Augustine, Florida.
