= Oz Bach =

American folk musician and bassist (1939–1998)

- Born: Paul Michael Bach; June 24, 1939; Paw Paw, West Virginia
- Died: September 21, 1998 (aged 59); Asheville, North Carolina
- Known for: Bass player for Spanky and Our Gang

Paul Michael "Oz" Bach (June 24, 1939 – September 21, 1998) was an American folk musician and bassist for the 1960s group Spanky and Our Gang.

Bach entered music in 1962 as a guitarist, singer and comedian, before switching to bass in 1963. He then played as a back-up musician for Fred Neil, Tom Paxton, Bob Gibson and Josh White. In 1965, Bach and his friend Nigel Pickering made the acquaintance of Elaine "Spanky" McFarlane, a singer from Chicago. The three later became Spanky and Our Gang. The trio released their eponymous debut album in 1967.

He left the band prior to the release of their second album Like to Get to Know You in 1968. He then began to work as an arranger for Linda Ronstadt, Steve Miller and Sérgio Mendes. In the late sixties, Bach joined bands such as Wings, Spooner Summit, and Tarantula.

After 1972, Bach started a talk show in Florida and directed an award-winning short film "Froggy Went A-Courtin'" (1977).

Bach died of cancer in September 1998. He was buried at the Blue Ridge Gardens of Memory Cemetery at Pisgah Forest, North Carolina. He was married four times and had seven children: Philip, Kelly, Kim, Jessica, Sarah, Belinda and Jonathan.

== Discography ==
- Spanky and Our Gang (1967)
- Like to Get to Know You (1968)
- Live (1965 - released 1968)
- Wings (1968)
- Tarantula (1969)
