= More Golden Hits =

Greatest hits album by The Turtles
- Released: March 1970
- Recorded: 1967–1970
- Label: White Whale
- Producer: The Turtles

The Turtles chronology
Golden Hits (1967)	More Golden Hits (1970)	Wooden Head (1970)

More Golden Hits is a 1970 greatest hits album by American rock band the Turtles. It was released on White Whale Records.

== Track listing ==
Side 1

1. "We Ain't Gonna Party No More" (Howard Kaylan) -- 4:54 (new track)
2. "Story of Rock & Roll" (Harry Nilsson) -- 2:40 (non-LP single)
3. "You Showed Me" (Gene Clark, Jim McGuinn) -- 3:05 (from The Turtles Present the Battle of the Bands)
4. "Sound Asleep" (Kaylan, Mark Volman) -- 2:30 (non-LP single)
5. "You Don't Have to Walk in the Rain" (Kaylan, Al Nichol, Jim Pons, John Seiter, Volman) -- 2:27 (from Turtle Soup)
6. "Who Would Ever Think that I Would Marry Margaret" (Ralph Dino, John Sembello) -- 2:02 (new track)

Side 2

1. "She's My Girl" (Gary Bonner, Alan Gordon) -- 2:32 (non-LP single)
2. "Elenore" (Johnny Barbata, Kaylan, Al Nichol, Pons, Volman) -- 2:49 (from The Turtles Present the Battle of the Bands)
3. "Lady-O" (Judee Sill) -- 4:10 (Non-LP single)
4. "Hot Little Hands" (Kaylan, Nichol, Pons, Seiter, Volman) -- 2:59 (from Turtle Soup)
5. "Love in the City" (Kaylan, Nichol, Pons, Seiter, Volman) -- 2:03 (the reel-to-reel version is 3:40) (from Turtle Soup)
6. "Cat in the Window" (Bonner, Gordon) -- 1:41 (previously unreleased)
