= Wings (1968 band) =

American folk rock band

Wings was a psychedelic folk rock band from the late sixties. The band members were veterans from an assortment of other sixties bands. Initially, the band was made up of Oz Bach of Spanky and Our Gang on bass, Pam Robins of Serendipity Singers sang, and on guitar Eddie Simon, younger brother of Paul Simon of Simon & Garfunkel. Before their first and only album was recorded, Eddie Simon was replaced with Jim Mason who co-wrote the Peter, Paul and Mary song "I Dig Rock and Roll Music" and years later was the producer for Firefall's first 2 albums. Also playing in the band were keyboardist Steve Knight, who later joined Mountain, Jefferson Airplane drummer Jerry Peloquin, and guitarist Jack McNichol.

== History ==
In the summer of 1968, the band began playing as an opening act for Big Brother and the Holding Company and Sly and the Family Stone. They soon signed to the record label ABC Dunhill Records, and recorded their only album at Sunset Sound with producer Steve Barri.

The band's name comes from a small slip of paper that was sent to Jim Mason with the word "Wings" written on it.

They had hoped to replace the Mamas & the Papas, but the band split before the end of the year. Only the song "General Bringdown" made a mark on the charts.

== Discography ==
- Wings (1968) (ABC Dunhill Records)
