= Ain't Gonna Lie =

Single by Keith
- A-side: "Ain't Gonna Lie"
- B-side: "It Started All Over Again"
- Released: 1966
- Genre: Pop rock; bubblegum pop
- Length: 2:56
- Label: Mercury Records
- Songwriters: Tony Powers and George Fischoff

"Ain't Gonna Lie" is a popular song written by Tony Powers and George Fischoff. The song was a 1966 hit for Keith peaking at No. 39 on the Billboard Hot 100 chart.

The song was also released as a single by the Gene Cipriano Trio.
