= Elevator Suite =

British electronic pop group

- Genre: Electronic pop
- Years active: January 1999-2007(estimate)
- Members: Andy Childs; Paul Roberts; Dan Brown; Dan Moore; Jock
- Past members: Steve Grainger

Elevator Suite were a British electronic pop group. They were formed in January 1999 by DJs Andy Childs, Paul Roberts, and Steve Grainger.

The group's first single was "Man in a Towel" and was followed by two more songs ("Barefoot" and "Weekend Wonderboy"). Their first two singles were featured as BBC Radio 1’s 'Record of the Week' and thereafter they toured Europe in support of Morcheeba.

Their debut album, Barefoot & Shitfaced, was released on 25 October 1999 on Infectious Records. Their track, "Back Around", peaked at No. 71 in the UK Singles Chart in August 2000.

In 2003 to 2004 they released 2 singles on Vinyl. A cover of Idris Muhammad's Could Heaven Ever Be Like This titled "I Feel Music" in 2003 and Blue Lights in 2004 which would eventually end up as bonus tracks on their 2008 compilation "Elevator Suite (The Remixes)".

The group released their self-titled second album on 9 October 2007 on Pure Mint Recordings. The 2007 line-up of the group consisted of Roberts (vocals), Dan Brown (bass guitar - formerly of Ilya), Childs (vocals/tambourines/producer/arranger), Dan Moore (keyboards), and Jock (drums). "The Wheel" was released as a single on 26 November 2007, and included remixes by Phil Hartnoll and Alex Metric.

== Discography ==
- Barefoot & Shitfaced (1999)
- Elevator Suite (2007)
- Elevator Suite (The Remixes) (2008)
