= Spanky & Our Gang Live =

Live album by Spanky and Our Gang
- Released: December 1970
- Recorded: early 1967
- Venue: Gaslight Club South, Coconut Grove, Florida
- Genre: Folk rock
- Length: 39:32
- Label: Mercury
- Producer: Dick Kunc

Spanky and Our Gang chronology
Spanky's Greatest Hit(s) (1969)	Spanky & Our Gang Live (1970)	Change (1975)

Professional ratings
Review scores
Source	Rating
AllMusic	2/5 stars

Spanky & Our Gang Live is the fifth album by American 1960s folk-rock band Spanky and Our Gang.

Following the sudden death of co-founder Malcolm Hale in 1968, Spanky and Our Gang had stopped publishing albums after having completed three albums for Mercury Records and a Greatest Hits LP. However, such was the demand for further product from this popular act, that Mercury released Spanky & Our Gang Live in December 1970. Recorded in early 1967, the album represents the group performing to an enthusiastic audience at the Gaslight Club South in Coconut Grove, Florida. Prepared from a good quality amateur recording of one of the group's earliest shows after being signed in 1966, it showcased their early sound before they became recording artists.

Although the band members are not credited, the album cover features original members Elaine "Spanky" McFarlane, Nigel Pickering, Paul "Oz" Bach and Malcolm Hale and was recorded prior to the addition of John "The Chief" Seiter, Kenny Hodges and Lefty Baker. The wide variety of musical tastes includes the bluegrass derived "Nagasaki," John Denver’s “Dirty Old Man”, Goffin and King’s “Wasn’t It You?” (introduced by the band as "Gypsy") plus Gordon Lightfoot’s "Steel Rail Blues" and "That's What You Get for Lovin' Me".

== Track listing ==
1. "Nagasaki" (Mort Dixon, Harry Warren) – 1:13
2. "Amelia Earhart's Last Flight" (Dave McEnery) – 4:20
3. "Waltzing Matilda" (A. B. Patterson, Marie Cowan) – 3:50
4. "Brother, Can You Spare a Dime?" (E. Y. Harburg, Jay Gorney) – 4:30
5. "Steel Rail Blues" (Gordon Lightfoot) – 3:05
6. "Oh Daddy" (Little Brother Montgomery, Elaine McFarlane) – 3:22
7. "Dirty Old Man" (John Denver) – 2:07
8. "The Klan" (M. Smith) – 4:40
9. "That's What You Get for Lovin' Me" (Gordon Lightfoot) – 2:20
10. "Blues My Naughty Sweetie Gives to Me" (Carey Morgan) – 2:21
11. "Wasn't It You?" (Gerry Goffin, Carole King) – 2:54
12. "You Got Trouble (from The Music Man)" (Meredith Willson) – 4:50
