= Sarah Hart (musician) =

American songwriter and musician

Sarah Hart is an American musician and songwriter in Nashville, Tennessee.

== Life and education ==
Originally from Lancaster, Ohio, Hart graduated with a degree in music theory and contemporary composition from The Ohio State University.

Hart resides in Nashville, Tennessee with her husband and two daughters. Hart is the biological daughter of folk musician Oz Bach. She works as a singer-songwriter writing with a focus on Contemporary Christian music and hymns. She has composed music recorded by artists including Amy Grant ("Better Than a Hallelujah",) Celtic Woman, Matt Maher (Flesh and Bone) and The Newsboys. Hart's hymns are published by Oregon Catholic Press.

Hart and Ben Glover co-wrote the song "All I've Ever Needed" by AJ Michalka from the Grace Unplugged soundtrack. Hart's song "All These Things" (Hart, Scott Dente, Ken Lewis) was featured on Dark Desires.

In October 2013, Hart performed for Pope Francis in St. Peter's Square at the World Meeting of Families in Rome.

In 2024 Sarah Hart was legally adopted by her stepfather.

== Discography ==
- Obvious (2001)
- Into These Rooms (2004)
- Road to Ohio (2008)
- Saint Song (2009)
- The Give and Keep (2010)
- This Winter's Eve (2011)
- Above Earth's Lamentations (2013)
- Til the Song is Sung (2016)
- Sacrament (2018)
- Choose Christ 2020: The Mass of St. Mary Magdalene (2019)
- Let Us All Rejoice (2020)
- Goodbye Jane (2024)
- All The Earth Alive Rejoicing (2024)
- Mass of the Child Christ (2025)

== Awards ==
Hart was nominated for a 2011 Grammy Award for Best Gospel Song and was the BMI Winner (Christian Song of the Year "Better Than a Hallelujah"), a Production Music Association Mark Award and 2020 Winner for Best Vocal Track for the song ("This Moment").
