= 98.6 (song) =

1966 song by Keith

- Cover art of the US single

Single by Keith

from the album 98.6/Ain't Gonna Lie
- B-side: "The Teeny Bopper Song"
- Released: November 1966
- Recorded: October 1966
- Genre: Sunshine pop
- Length: 3:05
- Label: Mercury 72639
- Songwriters: George Fischoff, Tony Powers
- Producer: Jerry Ross

Keith singles chronology
"Ain't Gonna Lie" (1966)	"98.6" (1966)	"Tell Me to My Face" (1967)

"98.6" is a song written by Tony Powers (lyrics) and George Fischoff (music) and recorded by Keith. It reached No. 6 in Canada, No. 7 on the Billboard chart, No. 10 on The New Zealand Listener charts and No. 24 on the UK Singles Chart in 1967 and appeared on his 1967 album 98.6/Ain't Gonna Lie. The Tokens, who had provided the backing vocals on Keith's debut single, "Ain't Gonna Lie", did the same for "98.6".

Produced by Jerry Ross and arranged by Joe Renzetti, it sold over one million copies worldwide, earning a gold disc.

It was the second of four songs Keith had in the Top 50 in Canada.

== Subsequent recordings ==
- The Bystanders released a version in January 1967. It reached No. 45 on the UK Singles Chart and was featured in the 2009 movie, The Boat That Rocked.
- Lesley Gore released a medley including this song and another by Powers and Fischoff, "Lazy Day", in May 1969. The medley went to No. 36 on the U.S. adult contemporary chart.

== See also ==
- List of 1960s one-hit wonders in the United States
