= Georgia Porcupine =

Single by George Fischoff
- A-side: "Georgia Porcupine"
- B-side: "I'll Never Forget You"
- Released: 1974
- Genre: Jazz
- Length: 2:28
- Label: United Artists Records
- Songwriter(s): George Fischoff

"Georgia Porcupine" is a popular jazz instrumental written and performed by pianist George Fischoff. Released as a single, the song was a hit for Fischoff in 1974, peaking at No. 10 on the July 20, 1974, Easy Listening chart in Billboard magazine.

The song has been covered by The Happy Piano, David Lee, and Tommy Johnson & Son.
