= Take a Picture (album) =

Studio album by Margo Guryan
- Released: October 1968
- Recorded: New York
- Genres: Soft rock; soft pop; baroque pop
- Length: 30:52
- Label: Bell
- Producers: John Hill, John Simon, David Rosner

Margo Guryan chronology
Take a Picture (1968)	25 Demos (2001)

Take a Picture is a 1968 album by singer-songwriter Margo Guryan and her sole album release.

== Album information ==
Primarily a songwriter, Margo Guryan signed to Bell Records as an artist, recording the album Take a Picture (1968), full of light, jazz-tinged pop melodies, produced and arranged initially by John Simon, then when he became unavailable, by John Hill, both overseen by David Rosner.

The musicians on the record included Hill on guitar, Kirk Hamilton (flute, bass), Phil Bodner (oboe), Paul Griffin (keyboards), and Buddy Saltzman (drums).

John Simon produced and arranged "Don't Go Away" prior to leaving to produce Janis Joplin. Simon had worked on an arrangement of "Think of Rain" for The Cyrkle that was not used, which incorporated aspects of Bach's "Air on the G String". This inspired the writing of "Someone I Know", which incorporates "Jesu, Joy of Man's Desiring".

The album was preceded by a single entitled "Spanky and Our Gang," a tribute to the band who had had a hit with "Sunday Morning," backed with her own version of "Sunday Morning". The single was included on the Japanese reissue of Take a Picture.

Guryan refused to tour, having been married to a jazz musician and having seen "too much—performing required an agent, and a manager and a lawyer and a booking person, and... you got owned by these people—they told you where to go, how to look, how to dress, and what to say, and I didn't want that! [...] I guess I had about enough 'daddy' when I was five, and I just didn't like being told what to do."

As a consequence of this, the label ceased promoting the album, and it thus failed to make an impact. Resigned to this, Guryan withdrew from performing, although she continued as a writer for April-Blackwood for several years afterwards and worked with Rosner, producing records for other artists.

== Reception ==
Professional ratings
Review scores
Source	Rating
AllMusic	4.5/5 stars

Take a Picture was praised by Billboard, who remarked on Guryan's "fine sound" which it characterised as "commercial" and said "should insure strong sales".

AllMusic said, "Although the song structures are simplistic on a superficial level, the arrangements beneath them are anything but. There are all kinds of intriguing things going on with or underneath the melody, either instrumentally or via affect."

Rolling Stone said the album "is an early prototype for countless lounge and dream-pop excursions and bridges the gap between Burt Bacharach and Belle & Sebastian. The hazy production is loaded with horns, strings and sumptuous harmonies".

== Track listing ==
All tracks composed by Margo Guryan

1. "Sunday Morning" – 2:20
2. "Sun" – 2:36
3. "Love Songs" – 2:37
4. "Thoughts" – 2:25
5. "Don't Go Away" – 2:04
6. "Take a Picture" – 3:08
7. "What Can I Give You?" – 2:31
8. "Think of Rain" – 2:25
9. "Can You Tell" – 2:34
10. "Someone I Know" – 2:46
11. "Love" – 5:26

== Personnel ==
- Kirk Hamilton – bass, flute
- Buddy Saltzman – drums
- John Hill – guitar
- Paul Griffin – keyboards
- Phil Bodner – oboe

Technical

- Fred Catero, Glen Kolotkin, Lou Waxman, Roy Segal – engineer
