= Devil's Anvil =

American hard rock band

The Devil's Anvil
- Origin: New York, NY
- Genres: Hard rock, psychedelia
- Years active: 1966–1967
- Label: Columbia
- Members: Steve Knight; Jerry Satpir; Eliezer Adoram; Kareem Issaq

The Devil's Anvil was a 1960s hard rock band based in New York City. They released one album, entitled Hard Rock from the Middle East, in 1967, showcasing a mix of 1960s hard-rock sound with Arab, Greek and Turkish songs and melodies.

== Formation ==
Instrumental in the band's formation was producer Felix Pappalardi, who helped sign them with Columbia Records.

It was in 1966, while hanging out in the Village that he chanced upon a group of Middle Eastern-born or -descended musicians, playing at the MacDougal Street Cafe Feenjon. Pappalardi began playing with them, and eventually they became the unofficial house band at Feenjon -- the core members of the group, which took the name The Devil's Anvil, were Steve Knight (rhythm guitar, bass, bouzouki), Jerry Satpir (lead guitar, vocals), Eliezer Adoram (accordion), and Kareem Issaq (oud, vocals). Knight and Pappalardi developed a good working relationship, trading the bass and guitar spots during the recording of the group's one album, Hard Rock from the Middle East, which set the stage for their subsequent team-up together in Mountain.

== Recordings ==
Unfortunately for The Devil's Anvil, their one and only album, Hard Rock from the Middle East, was released during escalating tensions between Israel and neighboring Arab countries and the subsequent Arab–Israeli War in 1967.

=== Hard Rock from the Middle East ===
Professional ratings
Review scores
Source	Rating
AllMusic	4/5 stars

All tracks arranged by the band unless otherwise indicated.

1. "Wala Dai" (Traditional*)
2. "Nahna Ou Diab"
3. "Karkadon" (Lebanese; composed by Abdul-Galil Wabbi, lyrics by Philimon Webbi)
4. "Selim Alai" (Traditional Arab*)
5. "Isme (El Atrash)"
6. "Besaha" (Lebanese; composed by Afif Radwan, lyrics by Abdul-Galil Wabbi)
7. "Shisheler" (Traditional Turkish)
8. "Kley" (Greek; composed by Theodorakis, lyrics by Leivaditis)
9. "Hala Laya" (Traditional Arab*)
10. "Treea Pethya" (Traditional Greek)
11. "Misirlou" (Traditional Middle Eastern; composed by Leeds, Roubanis, Russell, Wise)

*Arranged by Pappalardi
