= Nada (English musician) =

nada
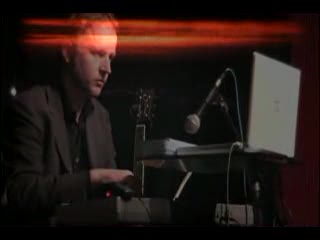
- Nada in 2007

Background information
- Origin: Brighton, England
- Genres: Electronic music
- Years active: 1986–present
- Label: Drift Records UK
- Members: Steve Grainger
- Website: http://www.reverbnation.com/nadasonic

Steve Grainger is an English electronic music composer and performer. His current project is nada.

== Biography ==
In 1999 Grainger signed with Infectious Records, a subsidiary of Mushroom Records as a founder member of Elevator Suite with DJs Andy Childs and Paul Roberts.

== nada ==
nada's debut album how to avoid matrimony was self-released in 2007.
