= Pure Mint Recordings =

Pure Mint
- Founded: 2004
- Founder: Anthony Hall; Dashal Beevers
- Genre: Various
- Country of origin: United Kingdom
- Location: London
- Official website: pure-mint.com

Pure Mint Recordings is a British independent record label based in London.

The label was established in 2004 by Anthony Hall (a dual qualified English and New York lawyer and musician) together with Dashal Beevers, growing out of an earlier incarnation called Mint Source Recordings. In 2003 Mint Source released the critically acclaimed compilation Flowers in the Attic featuring some of Nottingham's rising stars of deep house, including Crazy Penis, Bent – with their remix of the Hall & Oates classic "I Can't Go For That" (which Bent chose to finish their Big Chill set with in 2004), Zoe Johnston (who has written and performed with Faithless), Oz from The DiY Sound System, Heavy Deviance and Neon Heights amongst others.

The label has found supporters worldwide for its eclectic catalogue and has licensed repertoire to Norman Jay (Giant 45)], Carl Cox in Australia, Junior Vasquez, Fabric – Fabric Live 17 (mixed by AIM), Mastercuts (CUTSCD-58 Mastercuts Chilled,) Aquasky and others.

Releases include T-Total's version of Brian Eno's "Baby's on Fire" – with guest 'featured vocals' from Soft Cell's Marc Almond – and the debut long player "A Slow Walk Down The Stairs" from Heavy Deviance, themselves favourites of Chris Coco, Mark Rae, Rob Da Bank, KCRW (LA), Laurent Garnier, Bent, Crazy Penis etc. A Slow Walk Down The Stairs was voted 16th best album of 2005 by M8 Magazine.

The label has moved away from its originally exclusive dance release-base to include electropop (T-Total ft Marc Almond), indie folk (Nigel of Bermondsey), ex Gay Dad – nominated for the XFM 2009 New Music Award rock (Hungary's FreshFabrik), indie-dance (Elevator Suite), political satire (Margo Guryan's 16 Words) and breaks (Michael Morph), with collaborations and artist releases from Long Range (Phil Hartnoll from Orbital and Nick Smith]), Yo Majesty, Aquasky, Alex Metric and others.

As of November 2009, the label's catalogue comprises approximately 25 releases (singles, 12 inch vinyls and LPs)

On 4 December 2009 Hall resigned from the BPI Rights Committee and the IFPI's International Legal Committees citing irreconcilable differences over the industry's approach to file sharing and their support of the draft Digital Economy Bill (DEB) going through the UK parliament at the time. He was quoted as saying:

I am particularly surprised that the record industry has chosen to endorse s.17 of the DEB, which I consider is wholly undemocratic and contrary to centuries of good practice regarding the forming of our copyright legislation. I also believe it may set a dangerous precedent going forwards (and could come back to haunt the industry)
