= Sunday Mornin' (Spanky and Our Gang song) =

1967 single by Spanky and Our Gang

Single by Spanky and Our Gang

from the album Like to Get to Know You
- B-side: "Echoes"
- Released: December 1967
- Genre: Sunshine pop, psychedelic pop, pop rock
- Length: 3:00
- Label: Mercury
- Songwriter: Margo Guryan
- Producers: Stuart Scharf, Bob Dorough

Spanky and Our Gang singles chronology
"Lazy Day" (1967)	"Sunday Mornin'" (1967)	"Like to Get to Know You" (1968)

"Sunday Mornin'"

Single by Oliver
- B-side: "Letmekissyouwithadream"
- Released: November 1969
- Genre: Pop rock
- Length: 3:02
- Label: Crewe Records
- Songwriter: Margo Guryan
- Producer: Bob Crewe

Oliver singles chronology
"Jean" (1969)	"Sunday Mornin'" (1969)	"Angelica" (1970)

"Sunday Mornin'" is a pop/rock song written by Margo Guryan. It was recorded as "Sunday Morning" and appeared on her 1968 album Take a Picture as well as on the B-side to her single "Spanky and Our Gang."

"Sunday Mornin'" was made famous by Spanky and Our Gang, and was included on their album Like to Get to Know You. Their version became a hit single, peaking at No. 30 on the Billboard Hot 100 the weeks of February 10 and 17, 1968, No. 39 on the easy listening chart in early 1968, and No. 23 in the Canadian RPM Magazine chart.

It was recorded by the solo performer Oliver in 1969; also released as a single, it reached No. 35 and No. 14 on the same charts, and No. 20 in Canada.

"Sunday Mornin'" was listed as one of the "102 most performed songs in the BMI repertoire during 1968".

== Spanky and the Our Gang version ==
In the Spanky and the Our Gang version, the song also appears on an album in a long unedited version, including the group warming up their harmonies in the beginning (albeit for a different song), as well as an extended ending, where the sounds of a tape machine rolling back, plus the sounds of the group's joking until the fade is completed, causing one of the members to state that they need to get a new producer, resulting in laughter. This version lasted over six minutes in length.

== Chart history ==
Spanky and Our Gang single

Chart (1968)	Peak position
Canada RPM	23
U.S. Billboard Hot 100	30
U.S. Billboard Easy Listening	39

Oliver single

Chart (1969)	Peak position
Canada RPM	20
U.S. Billboard Hot 100	35
U.S. Billboard Easy Listening	14

== Other recordings ==
"Sunday Mornin'" was recorded by many others. Other contemporary recordings include those by:

- 1968: Bobbie Gentry and Glen Campbell, on the album Bobbie Gentry and Glen Campbell
- 1968: Baja Marimba Band, on the album Do You Know the Way to San Jose?
- 1968: Marie Laforêt (as "Et Si Je T'Aime", with French lyrics by Michel Jourdan), on Album : 4. She also recorded "E se ti amo", a version with Italian lyrics by Daniele Pace.
- 1969: Julie London, on Yummy, Yummy, Yummy.
- 1969: Richard "Groove" Holmes, on Welcome Home
- 1969: *A Hebrew version, was recorded by Shula Chen (as "Bo Habayta" (Come Home), with Hebrew lyrics by Avinoam Koren), on the album Yours, Shula Chen.
- 1969: Sue Raney, on With A Little Help From My Friends
- 2000: Linus of Hollywood, on Your Favorite Record
- 2001: Jim Galloway, on Music Is My Life
