= Margo Guryan =

American songwriter (1937–2021)

- Also known as: Brookmeyer; Margo Guryan Rosner
- Born: September 20, 1937; New York City, U.S.
- Origin: Far Rockaway, New York, U.S.
- Died: November 8, 2021 (aged 84) Los Angeles, California, U.S.
- Genres: Baroque pop, sunshine pop, jazz
- Occupations: Singer, songwriter, arranger
- Instruments: Vocals, piano
- Labels: Bell, Oglio
- Spouse: David Rosner (died 2017)

Margo Guryan (September 20, 1937 – November 8, 2021) was an American singer-songwriter. As a songwriter, her work was first recorded in 1958, although it was for her 1960s song "Sunday Mornin'", a hit for both Spanky and Our Gang and Oliver, that she is perhaps best known. Her songs have also been recorded by Cass Elliot, Glen Campbell and Astrud Gilberto, among others.

As a performer, she is best known for her 1968 album Take a Picture, the sole album release in the initial phase of her career. The album was re-released in 2000, and followed by a compilation entitled 25 Demos (2001). In 2014 the American record label Burger Records released another compilation, 27 Demos, on cassette.

== Life and career ==
=== Early life ===
Margo Guryan grew up in New York City in the neighborhood of Far Rockaway, Queens. Her parents met at Cornell University, where her mother majored in piano, and her father, also a keen pianist, in liberal arts. They were both of Russian-Jewish descent. Guryan wrote poems from an early age, and moved on to writing songs soon after being introduced to the piano in childhood. Initially interested in the popular music of the time, as well as the classical music she was studying, Guryan became interested in jazz at college. She studied classical and jazz piano at Boston University, idolizing musicians such as Max Roach and Bill Evans, and switched from piano to composition in her second year to avoid performing.

While still in high school, Guryan was sent to Frank Loesser's Frank Music, whose Herb Eiseman sent her on to Atlantic Records, where she performed her songs for Jerry Wexler and Ahmet Ertegun, who signed her up to song contracts, and had a demo session with Tom Dowd. She was signed by Atlantic, initially as a performer, but her initial attempts at recording were not successful, due in part to her inexperience and in part to a range break in her voice (as Guryan stated, "I couldn't damn sing!"). The label instead retained her as a writer.

Jazz singer Chris Connor recorded her song "Moon Ride" in 1958, while Guryan was still at university, and in 1962, Ms. Connor had recorded "Lonely Woman" with Guryan's lyrics. Another early recording of her work was by Harry Belafonte, who recorded "I'm On My Way to Saturday" for The Many Moods of Belafonte (1962). She attended the Lenox School of Jazz in 1959, where she met and worked with Ornette Coleman and Don Cherry, and was taught by Bill Evans, Max Roach, Milt Jackson, Jim Hall, John Lewis and Gunther Schuller, among others. She was one of two women admitted to the program that year. Following this, Lewis and Schuller signed her to MJQ Music. She was primarily a jazz musician in this period, married to jazz trombonist and pianist Bob Brookmeyer and writing lyrics for jazz pieces by composers including John Lewis, Ornette Coleman and Arif Mardin. Songs of this period, with her lyrics, were recorded by Chris Connor, Freda Payne, Nancy Harrow and Alice Babs, among others.

=== "Think of Rain" ===
Popular music passed Guryan by until, after her divorce from Brookmeyer, her friend Dave Frishberg urged her to listen to the song "God Only Knows" from the album Pet Sounds by The Beach Boys. According to Guryan,

"I thought it was just gorgeous. I bought the record and played it a million times, then sat down and wrote 'Think of Rain.' That's really how I started writing that way. I just decided it was better than what was happening in jazz."

Guryan played Creed Taylor, for whom she was at the time working as a secretary, a tape of some of her newer songs, and he pointed her in the direction of April-Blackwood, the publishing arm of Columbia Records. At April-Blackwood she met David Rosner, who would become not only her producer but also her husband. Rosner signed her up, and suggested she double-track her voice on demos, to compensate for the difficulties she had previously and produce a better sounding vocal. "Think of Rain" was recorded by Bobby Sherman, Jackie DeShannon and Claudine Longet in 1967. The Cyrkle and Nilsson also recorded versions although neither was released.

"Sunday Morning" was recorded by Spanky and Our Gang as "Sunday Mornin'". Released in December 1967, it reached No. 30. Bobbie Gentry and Glen Campbell sang it as a duet in 1968. Also in 1968, Marie Laforêt released "Et si je t'aime", a French version of "Sunday Mornin'" with lyrics by Michel Jourdan. That same year, she released an Italian version, entitled "E Se Ti Amo". Oliver also released a version of "Sunday Mornin'", which reached No. 35 in the US charts in 1969. "Sunday Mornin'" was listed as one of the "102 most performed songs in the BMI repertoire during 1968".

Carmen McRae and Julie London both released versions of two songs by Guryan: McRae performing "Can You Tell" and "Don't Go Away" on The Sound of Silence (1968) and London releasing "Sunday Mornin'" and "Come to Me Slowly" on Yummy, Yummy, Yummy (1969). Tommy LiPuma commissioned Guryan to write a Christmas song for Claudine Longet, and the result was "I Don't Intend to Spend Christmas Without You", a 1967 single. Saint Etienne later covered the song on a Christmas fanclub release.

=== Take a Picture ===
Guryan signed to Bell Records as an artist, recording an album, Take a Picture (1968), full of light, jazz-tinged pop melodies, produced and arranged initially by John Simon, then when he became unavailable, by John Hill, both overseen by David Rosner. The musicians on the record included Hill on guitar, Kirk Hamilton (flute, bass), Phil Bodner (oboe), Paul Griffin (keyboards) and Buddy Saltzman (drums).

It was preceded by a single entitled "Spanky and Our Gang", a tribute to the band who had had a hit with "Sunday Morning", backed with her own version of "Sunday Morning". The single was included on the Japanese reissue of Take a Picture. Take a Picture was praised by Billboard, who remarked on Guryan's "fine sound" which it characterized as "commercial" and said "should ensure strong sales". However Guryan refused to tour, having been married to a jazz musician and having seen "too much – performing required an agent, and a manager and a lawyer and a booking person and... you got owned by these people – they told you where to go, how to look, how to dress, what to say, and I didn't want that! [...] I guess I had about enough 'daddy' when I was five, and I just didn't like being told what to do." As a consequence of this, the label ceased promoting the album and it thus failed to make an impact.

Resigned to this, Guryan withdrew from performing, although she continued as writer for April-Blackwood for several years afterwards, and worked with Rosner producing records for other artists. Taking classical piano lessons after this led her to becoming a piano teacher herself, and producing music books for students. In 1994, Hal Leonard published The Chopsticks Variations, a set of 14 variations by Guryan on Euphemia Allen's well-worn "Chopsticks". Gunther Schuller described it as a "charming set of variations on the famous tune: clever, witty, at times tender and elegant, at other times punning and ribald".

=== Resurgence ===
Interest in Guryan's recordings underwent a revival in the 1990s, particularly in Japan. British band Saint Etienne covered "I Don't Intend to Spend Christmas Without You" for a 1998 fan club single. Linus of Hollywood met with Guryan in 1999, and as well as covering two of her songs on his Your Favourite Record album, reissued Take a Picture on his Franklin Castle Records imprint (in conjunction with Oglio Records) in 2000. Trattoria Records (Japan) and Siesta Records (Spain) also reissued the album.

In 1999, Kevin Dotson, Linus of Hollywood, visited Margo Guryan at her residence in Larchmont Village. Guryan presented Dotson with a selection of demos she had recorded during the 1960s and 1970s that were never released, along with sheets containing other original songs. Inspired by the quality of her work, Dotson encouraged Guryan to record these demos, which ultimately culminated in the 2001 release of the collection of demos entitled 25 Demos by Franklin/Oglio. An alternate version entitled Thoughts, released by UK-based RPM Records, has the 25 demos, plus two recordings of Guryan singing songs written by others. These tracks were also compiled by Burger Records on a 2014 cassette entitled 27 Demos, which Oglio again released on CD. To promote the re-release, Guryan issued a music video for the album track "California Shake", co-written by Richard Bennett.

In 2007, Guryan released a new single via British label Pure Mint Recordings, entitled "16 Words". The song referenced then US President George W. Bush's 2003 State of the Union Address, in particular the phrase "The British government has learned that Saddam Hussein recently sought significant quantities of uranium from Africa", which forms the entirety of the lyric. Other songs were attempted in the same session but not completed. The B-side was "Yes I Am", "an angry little ditty that I wrote for Nixon".

In 2009, Oglio Records released a CD of Guryan playing The Chopsticks Variations.

In June 2024, The Numero Group released a multi-LP box set.

On July 24, 2024, the tribute album Like Someone I Know: A Celebration Of Margo Guryan was publicly announced and was set to be released on November 8, 2024 (the third anniversary of Guryan's passing) via American record label Sub Pop. The album features reinterpretations of her sole studio album, Take a Picture, by contemporary musical artists Empress Of, Clairo, June McDoom, Rahill, Frankie Cosmos, Pearl & The Oysters, TOPS, Kate Bollinger, MUNYA, Bedouine, Margo Price and Barrie respectively. Empress Of's version of "Someone I Know" served as the album's lead single, alongside the announcement. A portion of the album's proceeds will be donated to non-profits, such as Planned Parenthood to help provide and advocate for affordable reproductive health services.

=== Last years ===
Her husband, David Rosner, died in 2017. Guryan died November 8, 2021, at the age of 84 at her home in Los Angeles.

== Discography ==
=== Albums ===
- Take a Picture (1968)

=== Compilations ===
- 25 Demos (2001)
- The Chopsticks Variations (2009)
- 27 Demos (2014)
- 29 Demos (2016)
- Words and Music (2024)

=== Singles ===
- "Spanky and Our Gang" (1968)
- "16 Words" (2007)
- "Half-Way In Love" (2024)
- "More Understanding Than a Man" (2024)

== Songs recorded by other artists ==
=== As songwriter ===
- "Moon Ride" – Chris Connor (1958)
- "I'm On My Way to Saturday" – Leon Bibb (on Leon Bibb Sings, 1961), Harry Belafonte (on The Many Moods of Belafonte, 1962)
- "Four-Letter Words – Miriam Makeba (on All About Miriam, 1966)
- "Think of Rain" – Jackie DeShannon (on For You, 1967), Claudine Longet (on The Look of Love, 1967), Lesley Miller (B-side to "Teach Me To Love You", 1967), Bobby Sherman (B-side to "Cold Girl", 1967) Monique Leyrac (as "Pense a la Pluie", with French lyrics by Michel Jourdan, 1967), The Split Level (on Divided We Stand, 1968)
- "Sunday Morning" – Spanky and Our Gang (1967), Bobbie Gentry and Glen Campbell (on Bobbie Gentry and Glen Campbell, 1968), Marie Laforêt (as "Et Si Je T'Aime", with French lyrics by Michel Jourdan, on Album : 4, 1968), Oliver (1969), Julie London (on Yummy, Yummy, Yummy, 1969), Sue Raney (on With A Little Help From My Friends, 1969), Linus of Hollywood (2000), Baja Marimba Band, Sue Raney, Dick Wellstood, Richard "Groove" Holmes
- "I Don't Intend To Spend Christmas Without You" – Claudine Longet (1967), Saint Etienne (1998)
- "I Love" – The Lennon Sisters (on On The Groovy Side, 1967)
- "Can You Tell" – Carmen McRae (on The Sound of Silence, 1968)
- "Don't Go Away" – Carmen McRae (on The Sound of Silence, 1968)
- "Come To Me Slowly" – Julie London (on Yummy, Yummy, Yummy, 1969), Samantha Jones (on A Girl Named Sam, 1970)
- "Thoughts" – Monica Zetterlund (as "Tankar Om Dej Och Mej", with Swedish lyrics by Tage Danielsson, released on Volym Fyra – I valet och kvalet (1967–1973), 1995)
- "I Think a Lot About You" – Cass Elliot (on Don't Call Me Mama Anymore, 1973)
- "Shine" – Linus of Hollywood
- "Love Songs" – Fuck (on Homesleep Singles Club #4, 2003), Clairo (2024)
- "Love" – Dawn Landes (on Sweet Heart Rodeo, 2009)
- "More Understanding Than a Man" (lyric and music by Guryan) – Nancy Harrow (on You Never Know, 1963), Alice Babs (released on As Time Goes By, recorded 1960–1969)
- "California Shake" – Ben Lester (2020)
- "The Hum" – Bedouine (2020)
- "Think Of Rain" – Pearl & The Oysters (2021)

Guryan wrote two pieces on Lenox School Of Jazz Concert 1959, an album credited to Ornette Coleman/Don Cherry/Kenny Dorham.

=== As lyricist ===
- "Lonely Woman" (lyrics by Guryan, music by Ornette Coleman) – Chris Connor (1962), Freda Payne (on After the Lights Go Down Low and Much More!!!, 1964), Carola Standertskjöld (1966)
- "Milano" (lyrics by Guryan, music by John Lewis) – Chris Connor
- "This Lovely Feeling" (lyrics by Guryan, music by Arif Mardin) – Dizzy Gillespie (1963)
- "If I Were Eve" (lyrics by Guryan, music by John Lewis) – Nancy Harrow (on You Never Know, 1963), Alice Babs (released on As Time Goes By, 2009, recorded 1960–1969)
- "No-one" (lyrics by Guryan, music by Arif Mardin) – Arif Mardin, featuring Dianne Reeves (on All My Friends are Here, 2010)
- "Song for the Dreamer" (lyrics by Guryan, music by John Lewis) – Nancy Harrow (on You Never Know, 1963), Alice Babs / Nils Lindberg's Orchestra (on Music with a Jazz Flavour, 1973)
- "To Welcome the Day" (lyrics by Guryan, music by Ornette Coleman) – Judy Niemack (on Long as You're Living, 1990), Pat Thomas, Malcolm McNeill
- "I Want to Sing a Song" (lyrics by Guryan, music by Gary McFarland) – Anita O'Day (on All The Sad Young Men, 1962)
