= Ben Lester =

English musician (born 1998)

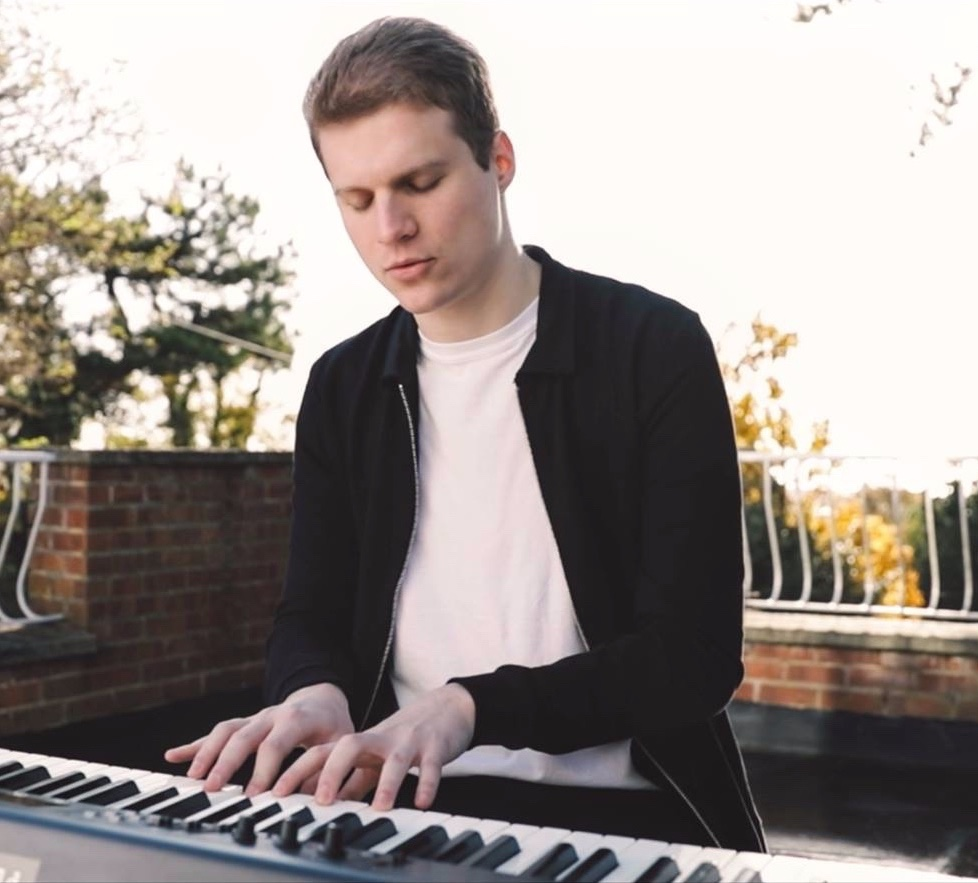
- Ben Lester performing in 2019

Background information
- Born: 16 April 1998 (age 28); Barnet, London, England
- Genre: Chamber pop
- Occupations: Singer; songwriter; musician
- Instruments: Vocals, Guitar, Bass Guitar, Keyboards, Drums
- Years active: 2017–present
- Label: Mayfield Records

Ben Lester (born 16 April 1998) is an English recording artist and multi-instrumentalist. His style has been described as "a distinctive brand of chamber pop" informed by his love of The Beach Boys.

Lester was chosen as a BBC Introducing featured artist at age 19, and was championed by presenter Gary Crowley as a "hugely talented singer-songwriter" who "creates his own unique moods". Following regular airplay of his early self-released recordings, Lester signed to Mayfield Records, and subsequently embarked on a UK tour. Following a prolonged hiatus, his self-titled debut album was released in September 2025 to critical acclaim.

== Personal life ==
Ben Lester was born in Barnet and raised in Watford, where he attended Watford Grammar School for Boys. He studied at The University of Southampton, graduating in 2019 with a BA Music. He currently teaches music and drama at Thomas's College.

== Discography ==
=== Studio albums ===
- Ben Lester (2025)
