= Keith (singer) =

American singer (born 1949)

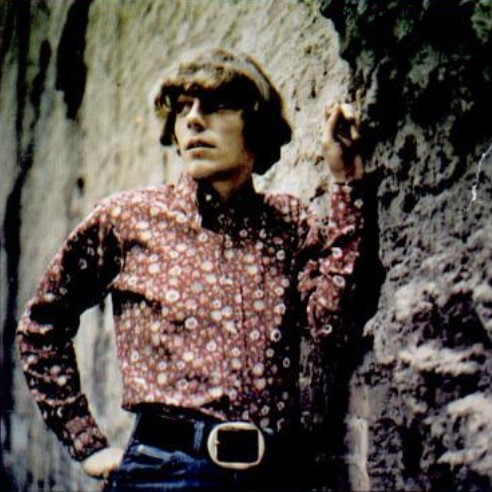

Background information
- Also known as: Bazza Keefer
- Born: James Barry Keefer; May 17, 1949 (age 77); Philadelphia, Pennsylvania, U.S.
- Genres: Pop
- Years active: 1966–present
- Labels: Columbia; Mercury; RCA
- Website: www.keith986.com

James Barry Keefer (born May 17, 1949), known professionally as Keith, is an American vocalist. His best-known song was "98.6" which reached No. 7 on Billboard Hot 100 in 1966. He legally changed his name to Bazza Keefer in 1988, in memory of his mother.

== Early life ==
Keith was born James Barry Keefer on May 17, 1949, in Philadelphia, Pennsylvania, United States.

== Career ==
=== Early days ===
Keefer earned his first recording contract with Columbia Records. When Jerry Ross moved across to Mercury Records he took Keefer with him, and the singer soon appeared on the Billboard Hot 100 chart, with his 1966 solo single, "Ain't Gonna Lie".

=== Chart success ===
He is best remembered for his one-hit wonder hit "98.6"; which was listed on the Billboard Hot 100 chart for 14 weeks in 1966-7, peaking at number 7 for two weeks, and finishing at number 79 on the 1967 year-end chart. It also peaked at number 6 in Canada, number 24 in the UK Singles Chart, and number 25 in Australia. It sold over one million copies worldwide, earning a gold disc. The track was written by Tony Powers (lyrics) and George Fischoff (music), arranged by Joe Renzetti, and was produced by Jerry Ross. 98.6 refers to the body's normal temperature expressed in Fahrenheit.

His debut album, 98.6/Ain't Gonna Lie, was also issued on the Mercury label.

=== Later days ===
His 1968 second Mercury LP, Out of Crank, failed to sell well. The low point in Keefer's life came when United States Army officials arrested him for draft evasion during a concert tour. "I was making coffee for generals," said Keefer. When he got out, Keith did some independent recording and joined Frank Zappa's 1974 touring band. "I think they brought me in to commercialize Frank," Keefer said. Contrary to popular belief, he never sang in Zappa's band. Soon afterward, he recorded three singles for Zappa's DiscReet Records label.

Keefer recorded one last album in 1969, The Adventures of Keith, for RCA Records. It did not sell well, and he then left the music industry until 1986, when an attempted comeback under his real name proved unsuccessful.

He set up A.I.R. Records in 1986 in Redondo Beach, California, and produced albums for several local musicians. These included the singer-songwriter Chuck Hill, and Keith's drummer Shawn Smith, who were both from Denver, Colorado.

In the 1990s, the singer moved into the television industry, although he continues to play live dates.

== Discography ==
=== Singles ===
Keith and the Admirations

Year	Title	Peak chart positions		Record label	B-side
Year	Title	US	UK	Record label	B-side
1965	"Caravan of Lonely Men"	–	–	Columbia Records	"Dream"

Keith

Year	Title	Peak chart positions				Record label	B-side	Album
Year	Title	US	UK	AU	CAN	Record label	B-side	Album
1966	"Ain't Gonna Lie"	39	–	–	30	Mercury Records	"Our Love Started All Over Again"	98.6/Ain't Gonna Lie
1966	"98.6"	7	24	25	6	Mercury Records	"The Teeny Bopper Song"	98.6/Ain't Gonna Lie
1967	"Tell Me to My Face"	37	51	99	22	Mercury Records	"Pretty Little Shy One"	98.6/Ain't Gonna Lie
1967	"Daylight Savin' Time"	79	–	–	–	Mercury Records	"Happy Walking Around"	Out of Crank
1967	"Sugar Man"	–	–	–	–	Mercury Records	"Easy as Pie"	Out of Crank
1967	"I'm So Proud"	135	–	–	44	Mercury Records	"Candy Candy"	
1968	"The Pleasure of Your Company"	–	–	–	–	Mercury Records	"Hurry"	
1969	"Marstrand"	–	–	–	–	RCA Victor	"The Problem"	The Adventures of Keith
1974	"In and Out of Love"	–	–	–	–	DiscReet Records	"What Did You Do in the Revolution Dad?"	

=== Albums ===
Year	Album	US BB	Record label
1967	98.6/Ain't Gonna Lie	124	Mercury Records
1967	Out of Crank	–	Mercury Records
1969	The Adventures of Keith	–	RCA Records
2004	Ain't Gonna Lie	–	RPM Records

== See also ==
- List of performers on Top of the Pops
- List of one-word stage names
