= Lazy Day (Spanky and Our Gang song) =

Single by Spanky and Our Gang

from the album Spanky and Our Gang
- B-side: "(It Ain't Necessarily) Byrd Avenue"
- Released: October 1967
- Genre: Sunshine pop
- Length: 3:10
- Label: Mercury
- Songwriters: George Fischoff, Tony Powers
- Producer: Jerry Ross

Spanky and Our Gang singles chronology
"Making Every Minute Count" (1967)	"Lazy Day" (1967)	"Sunday Mornin'" (1968)

"Lazy Day" is a song written by Tony Powers (lyrics) and George Fischoff (music), and recorded by the 1960s band Spanky and Our Gang. It appeared on their album Spanky and Our Gang.

The song stayed in the Top 40 four weeks longer than "Sunday Will Never Be the Same", which peaked higher on the Billboard Hot 100 chart. "Lazy Day" was featured on The Ed Sullivan Show and sold over one million copies.

== Critical reception ==
Written by George Fischoff and Tony Powers, the song received generally positive reviews and is fondly remembered. According to AllMusic, "Lazy Day" "...is a giddy joy no matter what." Despite calling the lyrics frothy, The Milwaukee Journal writer Dick Young called the melody magnetic.

== Chart performance ==
"Lazy Day" peaked at number 14 on the Billboard Hot 100 chart after its 1967 release and hit number 1 in the Canadian RPM Magazine charts.

== Other versions ==
- Tinkerbells Fairydust, in December 1967 on Decca (catalog no. F 12705; Vinyl 7").
- Lesley Gore, in May 1969 as a medley with "98.6", also written by Fischoff and Powers.
- The song's opening was sampled in Masta Ace's 2001 single "Take A Walk".
- Gas House Gang, a barbershop quartet, in 2003 on their album "The Gas House Gang's Fifth".
- A performance by Herb Alpert and the Tijuana Brass appears on the Lost Treasures CD, Shout DK 32867, released in 2005 as part of "The Herb Alpert Signature Series".
