= Tony Powers =

American songwriter

- Born: Howard Stanley Puris; 1938 (age 86–87); The Bronx, New York, US
- Genres: Pop music
- Occupation(s): Songwriter, performer, actor
- Years active: Late 1950s – present
- Website: http://tonypowersmusic.com/

Howard Stanley Puris (born 1938), known as Tony Powers or Anthony Powers, is an American songwriter, recording artist, music video artist, and actor. He was responsible for writing or co-writing the hit songs "Remember Then", "Why Do Lovers Break Each Other's Heart", "98.6", "Lazy Day", and many others including "We're The Banana Splits", the Kiss songs "Odyssey" and "The Oath", and Powers' own "Don't Nobody Move (This is a Heist)".

== Biography ==
He was born in Manhattan and grew up in Pelham Parkway in the East Bronx, New York City. In the late 1950s, he started writing and selling songs, and began working for Trio Music, a music publishing firm established in the Brill Building by Jerry Leiber and Mike Stoller. One of his early songs, "Remember Then", became a hit for The Earls in 1962; some versions, and Powers himself, but not original record labels, state that it was co-written with Beverly Ross. Powers soon established a writing partnership with Ellie Greenwich, co-writing The Exciters' 1963 hit "He's Got The Power" and Jay and the Americans' "This Is It" with her; and then co-writing, with Greenwich and Phil Spector, "Today I Met The Boy I'm Gonna Marry" for Darlene Love, and "Why Do Lovers Break Each Other's Heart" for Bob B. Soxx & the Blue Jeans (later also a UK hit for Showaddywaddy).

In the mid-1960s, Powers moved to Don Kirshner's Screen Gems publishing company, an arm of Colpix Records. He continued to have success as a songwriter, with hits including Spanky & Our Gang's "Lazy Day", and Keith's "98.6" both co-written with George Fischoff. With Ritchie Adams, he also co-wrote "We're the Banana Splits", intended as the theme song for The Banana Splits TV series in 1968. Other writers with whom Powers shared songwriting credits in the 1960s include Jeff Barry, Artie Kornfeld, Jack Keller, Al Kooper, and Mark Barkan.

During the late 1960s, Powers began to feel that "writing solely for commercial purposes was far too limiting and restrictive", and began writing songs that "concern the 'human condition' seen from a working-class viewpoint... for the most part social and political comments, usually couched in dark humor with a bit of sarcastic anger". He began performing his own material in clubs in New York and Los Angeles, where he later settled. He released an album on his own label, Home-Made (My Real Name is Howard Stanley Puris), in 1971.

In 1981, he pioneered shooting the music video as a short movie when he began filming the comedic spoken-word to music cult classic "Don't Nobody Move (This is a Heist)". By 1982, he had created a 26-minute video consisting of "Heist", "Odyssey" (co-starring Lois Chiles), and Midnite Trampoline". He called the piece a MusicFilm, as they were three of the very first Music Videos with a narrative, and shot on film. The trilogy was based around "Don't Nobody Move (This is a Heist)". All three short films were shot around New York with actor friends including Peter Riegert, Treat Williams, Stephen Collins, Marcia Strassman, the then-unknown John Goodman, and others. On its own the "Heist" MusicFilm won several awards, including the Silver Medal at The 26th Annual International Film and Music Festival of New York, the Gold Medal at The 1st International Music Video Festival of Saint Tropez, and was Details Magazine's "Video of the Year". It was subsequently widely shown on HBO and on the US TV show Night Flight. This trilogy of MusicFilms were released in 1985 on a Sony Video Album, and after turning down a recording contract with Columbia Records the music alone was also issued as an EP. "Odyssey" had been recorded also by rock band Kiss in 1981, and included in their album Music from "The Elder".

Credited as Anthony Powers, he started appearing in small acting roles in movies and TV in the early 1980s. His roles have included parts in the TV series The Equalizer, NYPD Blue, Lois & Clark: The New Adventures of Superman, and The King of Queens. He has also appeared in the movies Cadillac Man and Goodfellas (both in 1990), and Catch Me If You Can (2002), as well as in commercials.

He released the self-produced albums Under the Cover of Darkness in 1996, and Who Could Imagine, called "a masterpiece" by Joel Selvin, former pop critic of the San Francisco Chronicle, in 2007.

He has written two novels: Bedloe (A True Fable) (2020) and The Attendant (2022), which has been optioned for film. His third novel, "The Beginning," a memoir as roman à clef, is currently in search of an agent.
