= The Conception Corporation =

The Conception Corporation was an American comedy ensemble consisting of Murphy Dunne, Howard R. Cohen, Ira Miller, and Jeff Begun. They recorded three albums (one of them unreleased) between 1970 and 1973, and made the "underground television show" Void Where Prohibited by Law (similar in concept to Ken Shapiro's Groove Tube productions), which was shown in Chicago and Los Angeles in 1971. Carol Androsky and Lynne Lipton were part of the recording ensemble and members.

Cohen died in 1999, Miller died in 2012. The other members have remained active in various music and film projects.

== Discography ==
- 1970 – A Pause in the Disaster (Cotillion SD9031)
- 1972 – Conceptionland and Other States of Mind (Cotillion SD9051)
- 1973 – Live at Hollywood High (Recorded for Cotillion; released only on Complete Conception)
- 2000 – Complete Conception (compilation; Rhino Handmade RHM2-7728)

== Filmography ==
- 1971 – Void Where Prohibited by Law
