= Like to Get to Know You =

Single by Spanky and Our Gang

from the album Like to Get to Know You
- B-side: "Three Ways from Tomorrow"
- Released: March 1968
- Recorded: 1968
- Genre: Sunshine pop, blue-eyed soul
- Length: Single: 3:19; Album: 2:15 (single), 0:59 (coda)
- Label: Mercury
- Songwriter: Stuart Scharf
- Producers: Bob Dorough; Stuart Scharf

Spanky and Our Gang singles chronology
| "Sunday Mornin'" (1968) | "Like to Get to Know You" (1968) | "Give a Damn" (1968) |

"Like to Get to Know You" is a 1968 song from Spanky and Our Gang. Written by Stuart Scharf, the song debuted at No. 71 on the Billboard Hot 100 on April 20, 1968 and peaked at No. 17 on June 8, 1968. It became a minor hit on the Billboard Easy Listening chart at the same time, eventually rising to No. 24 the same week it peaked on the Hot 100. In Canada, the song reached No. 5 on the RPM Magazine charts. On the album of the same name, the song is broken into two parts: the full vocal, and a coda that echoes the chorus and conversation from the song.

== Recording ==
As on their previous hit single, "Sunday Mornin'", their new producer, Stuart Scharf, also employed session musicians to create the instrumental backing track while the group members provided lead and background vocals. This was the first hit they recorded in Los Angeles—all of their previous records were cut in New York and produced by Jerry Ross. Session players on this recording included Max Bennett on bass; Larry Knechtel on piano; Mike Deasy on guitar; Hal Blaine on drums; Ralph Schaffer, Sid Sharp, Harry Bluestone, Marvin Limonick, Nathan Kaproff, William Hymanson and Mischa Russell on violins; Leonard Selic and David Burk on violas; Paul Bergstrom and Armand Kaproff on cellos; and Jules Chaikin on trumpet. Additional instruments were also played by Stuart Scharf, William Kurasch, and Bob Dorough with most of them playing wind instruments.

A performance of this song was featured on The Ed Sullivan Show on March 24, 1968. In the uniquely staged presentation, the members of the group appear to be at a cocktail party (interacting in a way that tracks the song's lyrics), while the song is performed by the same group on a stage behind them.

== Chart history ==
=== Weekly charts ===
| Chart (1968) | Peak position |
|---|---|
| Canada RPM Top Singles | 5 |
| US Billboard Hot 100 | 17 |
| US Billboard Easy Listening | 24 |
| US Cash Box Top 100 | 13 |

=== Year-end charts ===
| Chart (1968) | Rank |
|---|---|
| Canada | 88 |
| US (Joel Whitburn's Pop Annual) | 139 |
| US Cash Box | 100 |

== Use in popular culture ==
The song is heard in a 2016 TV commercial for The Tonight Show Starring Jimmy Fallon.

== Other versions ==
=== Covers ===
- The Johnny Mann Singers featured it on the album Sixties Mann.
- Julie London, for her 1969 album Yummy, Yummy, Yummy.
- Linda Dachtyl, 2024 release "Waves of Change" (Summit Records/Chicken Coup Records)
