= John Seiter =

American musician (born 1944)

- Also known as: Chief
- Born: August 17, 1944 (age 81); St. Louis, Missouri, U.S.
- Genres: Folk, rock, pop
- Occupation: Musician
- Instrument: Drums

John Seiter (born August 17, 1944) is an American musician. He is best known for his work as a drummer for Spanky and Our Gang and The Turtles.

== Biography ==
Seiter first rose to prominence as a member of the pop group Spanky and Our Gang. He joined the band in 1967, shortly after they achieved their first charting hit, "Sunday Will Never Be the Same", and stayed for three studio albums and a live concert recording. The band collapsed after the 1968 death of Malcolm Hale, and Seiter accepted a position as drummer for The Turtles, replacing John Barbata. The Turtles recorded one final studio album, Turtle Soup, then disbanded as well. Seiter next joined Rosebud for their eponymous debut, but shortly after the album's release the band collapsed in the wake of the divorce of members Judy Henske and Jerry Yester. Seiter subsequently remained active in the music scene, recording with such varied performers as Aztec Two-Step, Jane Getz, Tom Waits, and The Conception Corporation. His younger brother Jimmi Seiter is also a noted percussionist.
