= George Fischoff =

American songwriter

Background information
- Born: George Allan Fischoff; August 3, 1938; South Bend, Indiana, U.S.
- Died: February 20, 2018 (aged 79)
- Occupations: Songwriter, performer
- Years active: 1963-94

George Allan Fischoff (August 3, 1938 – February 20, 2018) was an American pianist and composer. He is best known as the writer or co-writer of many hit songs, including "Lazy Day", "98.6", "Run to My Lovin' Arms", "Ain't Gonna Lie", and "Georgia Porcupine", and as the composer for the Broadway musical Georgy.
