= Sunday Will Never Be the Same =

Single by Spanky and Our Gang

from the album Spanky and Our Gang
- B-side: "Distance"
- Released: April 1967
- Recorded: April 13, 1967
- Studio: Bell Sound (New York City)
- Genre: Baroque rock
- Length: 2:58
- Label: Mercury
- Songwriter(s): Terry Cashman, Gene Pistilli
- Producer(s): Jerry Ross

Spanky and Our Gang singles chronology
"And Your Bird Can Sing" (1966)	"Sunday Will Never Be the Same" (1967)	"Making Every Minute Count" (1967)

"Sunday Will Never Be the Same" is a 1967 song by the American band Spanky and Our Gang from their self-titled debut album. The single peaked at #9 on the Billboard Hot 100 and #7 in the Canadian RPM Magazine charts. The song was written by Terry Cashman and Gene Pistilli and borrows an interlude from the French carol “Les Anges Dans Nos Campagnes”. The arrangement is by Jimmy Wisner.

As with most of the band’s hit singles, producer Jerry Ross used a group of session musicians to provide the instrumental backing track while the rest of the group members provided lead and background vocals. Session personnel on this record included Vinnie Bell, Al Gorgoni, Hugh McCracken, Charles Macey on guitar, Paul Griffin on piano, Artie Butler on harpsichord, Joe Macho on bass, Bobby Gregg and Al Rogers on drums, Joe Macho, Irving Spice, Louis Stone, Ray Free, Matthew Raimondi, Lou Haber on violins, Artie Kaplan on flute, and Seymour Barab and Maurice Bialkin on cellos. Additional instruments were also played by Samuel Casale, Charles Naclerio, Joe Renzetti, and Jimmy Wisner.

== Cover versions ==
- The O'Kaysions released a version of the song on their 1968 debut album, Girl Watcher.
- A series of 1969 television commercials for Plymouth featured a jingle "Just look what Plymouth's up to now", sung by Petula Clark to the tune of "Sunday Will Never Be the Same".
- Cashman, Pistilli & West themselves covered the song on their 1968 album Bound to Happen.
