= Spanky and Our Gang =

American sunshine pop band

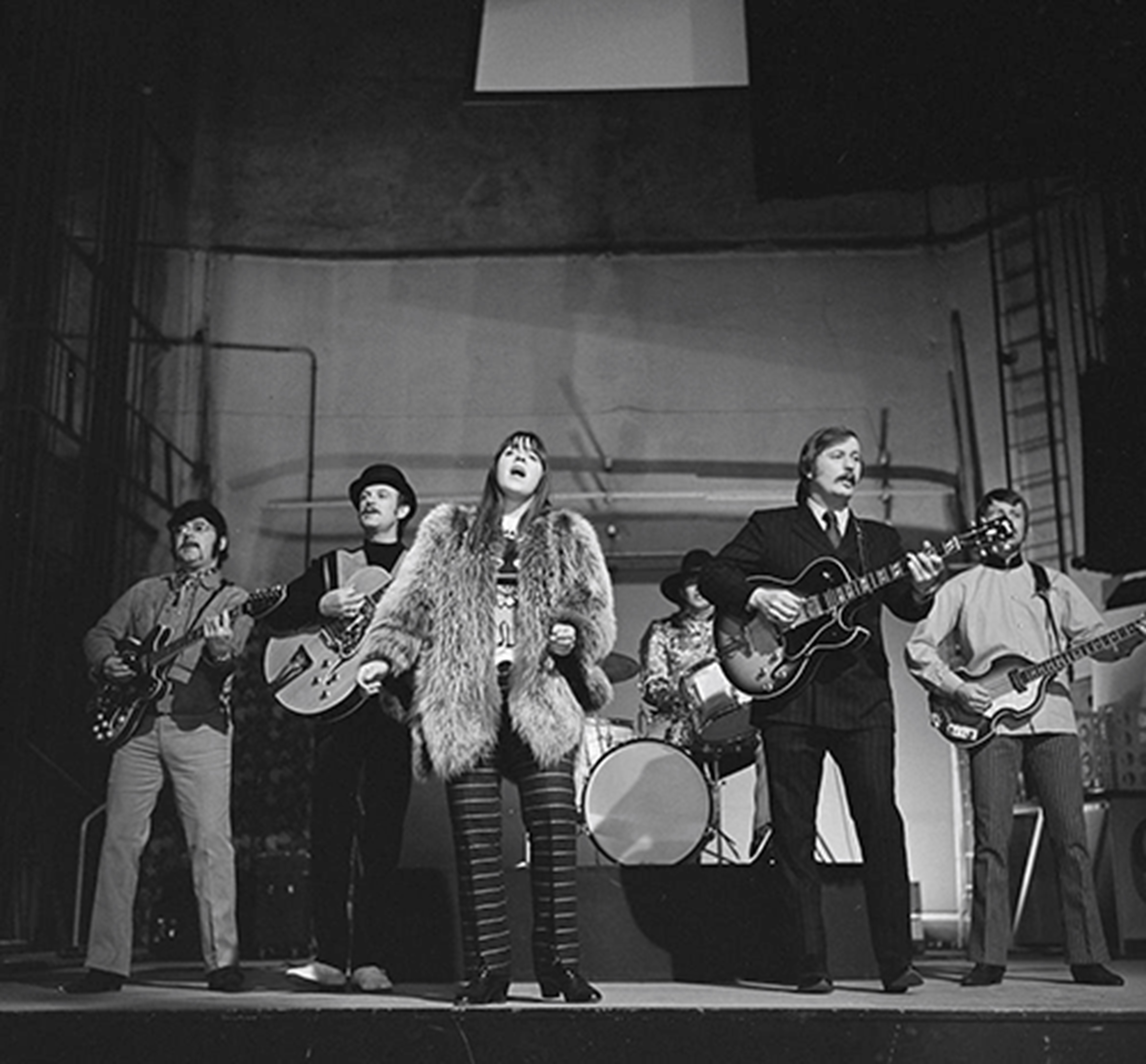
- Spanky and Our Gang (1968)

Background information
- Origin: Chicago, Illinois, United States
- Genres: Sunshine pop
- Years active: 1966–1969, 1974-1980
- Labels: Mercury Records, Epic Records, Spectra Records
- Past members: Oz Bach; Lefty Baker; Malcolm Hale; Kenny Hodges; Spanky McFarlane; Nigel Pickering; Jim Scherz; John Seiter

Spanky and Our Gang was an American 1960s sunshine pop band led by Elaine "Spanky" McFarlane. The band derives its name from Hal Roach's Our Gang comedies of the 1930s (known to modern audiences as The Little Rascals), because of the similarity of McFarlane's surname to that of George McFarland (Spanky). The group was known for its vocal harmonies and had major hits in the US and Canada in 1967–1968 with "Sunday Will Never Be the Same," "Lazy Day," "Sunday Mornin'," and "Like to Get to Know You."

== History and work ==
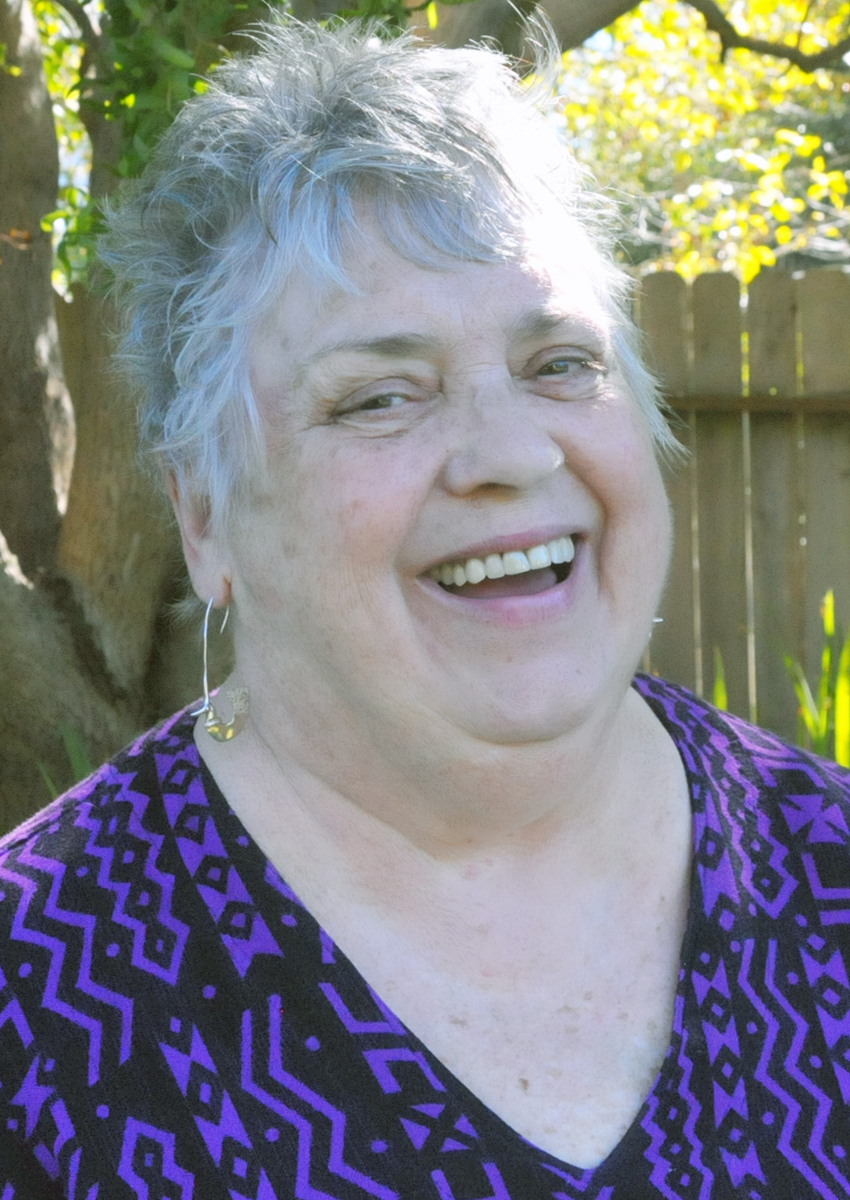
Spanky McFarlane (2015)

The group's first album, Spanky and Our Gang, was released by Mercury Records on August 1, 1967, with three popular songs that were released as singles. These were "Sunday Will Never Be the Same" (their biggest hit, which reached No. 9 on the U.S. Billboard Hot 100 chart in the summer of 1967), followed by "Making Every Minute Count" (reached No. 31/No. 23 in Canada) and "Lazy Day" (reached No. 14). Both "Sunday Will Never Be The Same" and "Lazy Day" sold over one million copies. "Sunday Will Never Be the Same" was written by Terry Cashman and Gene Pistilli. In an interview of Cashman on the Songfacts website, he revealed that the song was written as a ballad; however, the group "changed it, and they added the vocal, 'Ba-da-da-da-da,' which was a great hook."

Their second album, Like to Get to Know You, was released in April 1968. Two singles were released: "Sunday Mornin'" in the winter which reached No. 30 on February 10–17, 1968, and "Like to Get to Know You" in the spring which reached No. 17 on June 8, 1968. The latter single's B-side, "Three Ways From Tomorrow" also received considerable airplay. The album included their rendition of "Stardust", and a version of folksinger Fred Neil's "Everybody's Talkin'," subsequently a hit single for Harry Nilsson and the theme song for the movie Midnight Cowboy.

"Give a Damn" was released as a single in late summer 1968. Although not receiving airplay in several markets because of the curse word – and because it was a comment on racial equality that became the theme song for the New York Urban Coalition – the song became a regional hit and reached No. 43. The song reached No. 26 in the Canadian RPM magazine charts.

The band also performed the song on a November 1968 episode of ABC's The Hollywood Palace, as well as on a December 1968 episode of The Smothers Brothers Comedy Hour that resulted in CBS' Standards and Practices division receiving numerous complaints about the song's title being used during "family viewing hours". One such complaint reportedly came from President Richard Nixon. "Give a Damn" would become John Lindsay's campaign song during his successful run for mayor of New York.

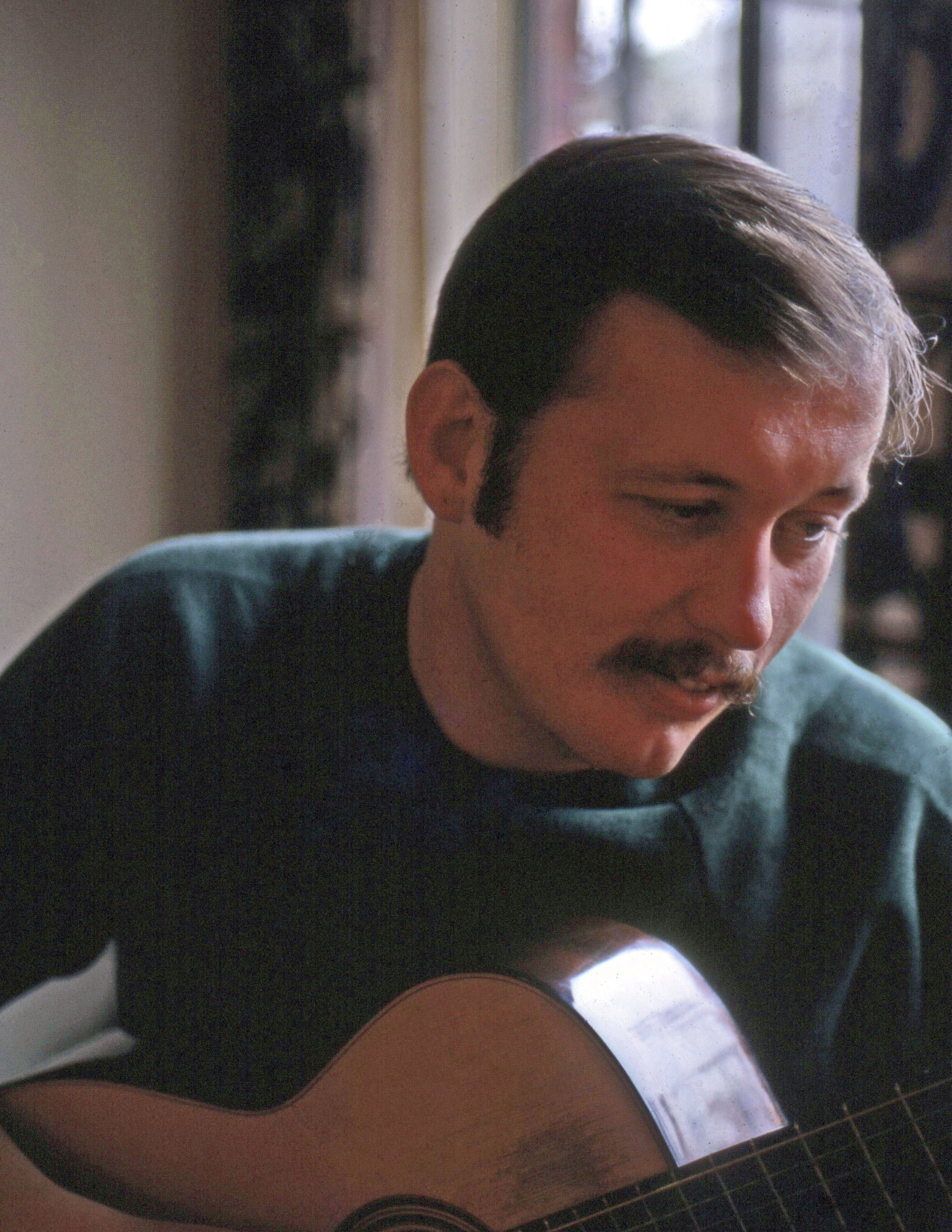
Malcolm Hale (1968)

On October 31, 1968, the group's lead guitarist Malcolm Hale was found dead in his Chicago home, and the coroner attributed the death to bronchial pneumonia. A 2007 book stated that Hale "died on a Sunday at age twenty-seven from carbon monoxide poisoning due to a bad heating system." Hale's death was a devastating blow to the group; the multi-instrumentalist did much of the arranging and largely kept the band together. Hale's death, along with the group's satisfaction over what they had achieved already, led to the decision to disband early in 1969. Mercury released a third album, Anything You Choose b/w Without Rhyme or Reason, in January 1969. It contained two popular songs, the previous summer's hit "Give a Damn" and "Yesterday's Rain" (No. 48 Canada). On August 11, 1971, Lefty Baker died of cirrhosis, about a year after he left the band. He was 32.

The group briefly reformed in 1974 with Spanky, Nigel Pickering and new members Jim Moon (drums), Will Plummer (bass, vocals) and Marc McClure (guitar, banjo, vocals) and recorded an album (Change) in 1975 for the Epic label, produced by Chip Young. They adopted more of a country sound and toured mostly in Texas clubs until around 1980.

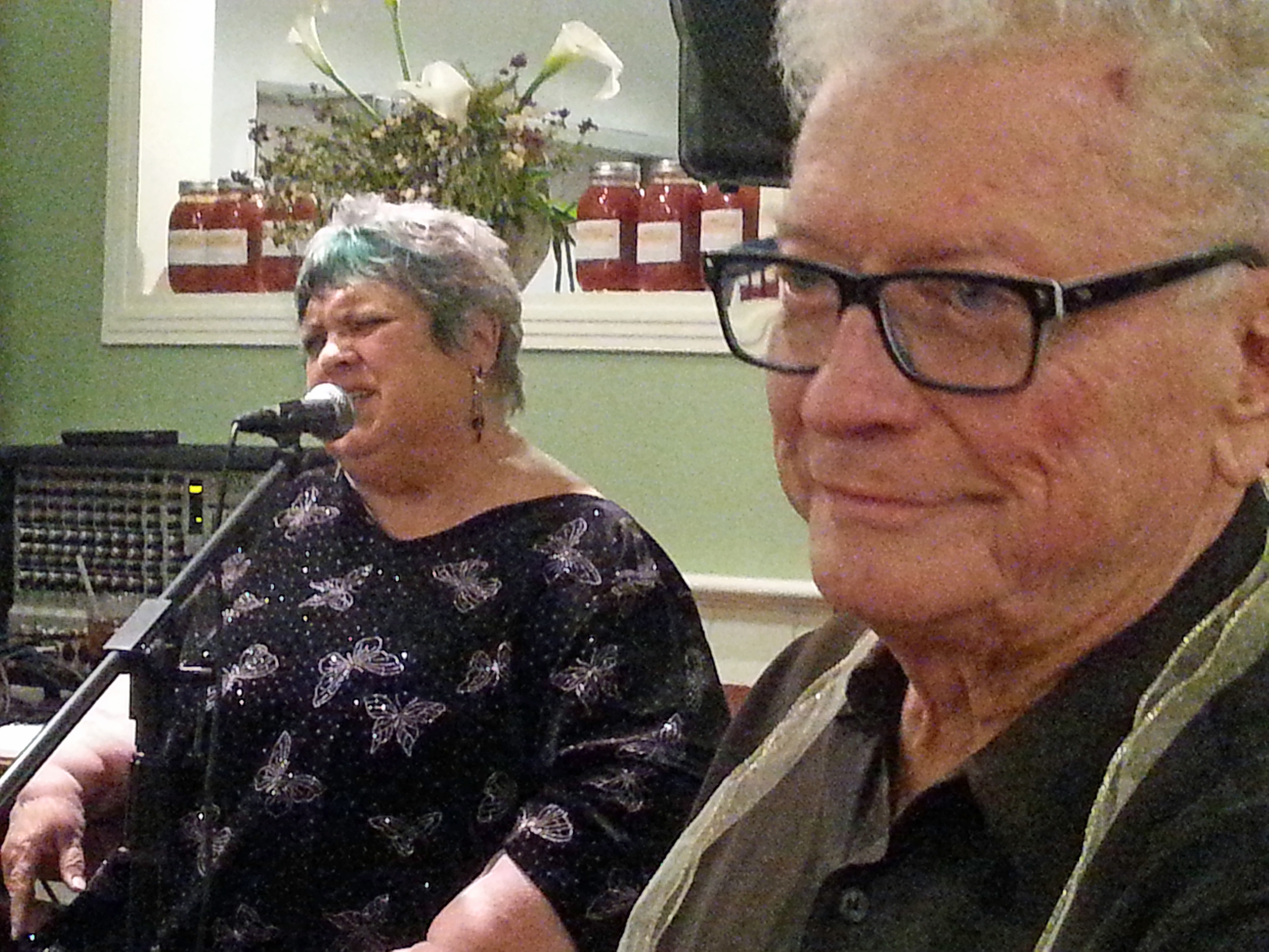
Spanky McFarlane sings to Curley Tait, manager of Spanky and Our Gang, on his 84th birthday

After the band dissolved, McFarlane had some success as a solo artist. In 1975, she briefly appeared in the film Moonrunners as a rough-and-tumble bartender. She toured with The New Mamas and the Papas, singing the parts which had been performed by Cass Elliot. She portrayed "Bloody Mary" in April 2011 on stage in Ferndale Repertory Theatre's production of South Pacific.

== Later releases ==
Because of the band's continued popularity, Mercury released album collections of their greatest hits: 1969's Spanky's Greatest Hit(s), 1989's budget Give a Damn and 2005's The Best of Spanky & Our Gang: 20th Century Masters – The Millennium Collection. In addition, Rhino issued the 1986 The Best Of Spanky and Our Gang and Hip-O Select issued a limited-edition anthology of Spanky and Our Gang's Complete Mercury Recordings that includes never-before-released recordings and extensive liner notes.

== Members ==
| Name | Birth Date | Birth Place | Death Date | Death Place | Role in Band |
|---|---|---|---|---|---|
| Elaine "Spanky" McFarlane | June 19, 1942 | Peoria, Illinois | | | vocals |
| Nigel Pickering | June 15, 1929 | Pontiac, Missouri | May 5, 2011 | St. Augustine, Florida | rhythm guitar, vocals |
| Paul "Oz" Bach | June 24, 1939 | Paw Paw, West Virginia | September 21, 1998 | Asheville, North Carolina | bass guitar, vocals (1966–67) |
| Malcolm Hale | May 17, 1941 | Butte, Montana | October 30, 1968 | Chicago, Illinois | lead guitar, trombone, vocals |
| John "The Chief" Seiter | August 17, 1944 | St. Louis, Missouri | | | drums, vocals (1967–69) |
| Geoffrey Myers | | | | | bass, vocals (1967) |
| Kenny Hodges | August 3, 1936 | Jacksonville, Florida | January 29, 2013 | Papillion, Nebraska | bass, vocals (1967–69) |
| Lefty Baker (real name Eustace Britchforth Baker) | January 7, 1939 | Roanoke, Virginia | August 11, 1971 | California | lead guitar, banjo, vocals (1967–69) |
| Jim "Moon" Scherz | April 26, 1946 | Brooklyn, New York | | | drums (1975) and road manager |
| Marc McClure | | | | | lead guitar, banjo, steel guitar, vocals (1975) |
| Bill Plummer | March 27, 1938 | Boulder, Colorado | | | bass, vocals (1975) |

== Discography ==
=== Albums ===
- Spanky and Our Gang (Mercury, 1967 – No. 77)
- Like to Get to Know You (Mercury, 1968 – No. 56)
- Anything You Choose b/w Without Rhyme or Reason (Mercury, 1969 – No. 101)
- Spanky's Greatest Hit(s) (Mercury, 1969 – No. 91; Canada - No. 78) (many songs were given new stereo mixes, and on the first CD reissue, the additional overdubs were removed)
- Spanky & Our Gang Live (Mercury, 1970, recorded in 1967)
- Change (Epic, 1975)
- The Best of Spanky & Our Gang (Rhino, 1986)
- Greatest Hits (Mercury, 1999)
- The Best of Spanky & Our Gang: 20th Century Masters – The Millennium Collection (Mercury, 2005)
- The Complete Mercury Recordings (Hip-O Select, 2006) (Four discs, limited edition of 5000 (un-numbered))
- Greatest Hits (Mercury, 2007)
- Back Home Americana (Spectra, 2010)
- The Singles and More (Crash, 2013)
- The Complete Mercury Singles (Real Gone Music, 2014) – Fourth disc from the Hip-O 4-CD set

=== Singles ===
| Year | Songs (A-side, B-side) Both sides from same album except where indicated | Chart | Chart | Album |
| Year | Songs (A-side, B-side) Both sides from same album except where indicated | US | Canada | Album |
|---|---|---|---|---|
| 1966 | "And Your Bird Can Sing" b/w "Sealed with a Kiss" | – | – | Non-album tracks |
| 1967 | "Sunday Will Never Be the Same" b/w "Distance" | 9 | 7 | Spanky and Our Gang |
| 1967 | "Making Every Minute Count" b/w "If You Could Only Be Me" | 31 | 23 | Spanky and Our Gang |
| 1967 | "Lazy Day" b/w "(It Ain't Necessarily) Byrd Avenue" | 14 | 1 | Spanky and Our Gang |
| 1968 | "Sunday Mornin'" b/w "Echoes" | 30 | 23 | Like to Get to Know You |
| 1968 | "Like to Get to Know You" b/w "Three Ways from Tomorrow" | 17 | 5 | Like to Get to Know You |
| 1968 | "Give a Damn" b/w "The Swingin' Gate" | 43 | 26 | Anything You Choose b/w Without Rhyme or Reason |
| 1968 | "Yesterday's Rain" b/w "Without Rhyme or Reason" | 94 | 48 | Anything You Choose b/w Without Rhyme or Reason |
| 1969 | "Anything You Choose" b/w "Mecca Flat Blues" | 86 | 79 | Anything You Choose b/w Without Rhyme or Reason |
| 1969 | "And She's Mine" b/w "Leopard Skin Phones" | 97 | 92 | Anything You Choose b/w Without Rhyme or Reason |
| 1969 | "Everybody's Talkin'" b/w "It Ain't Necessarily Bird Avenue" (from Spanky and Our Gang) | 126 (cashbox) | 88 | A-side is the same song as "Echoes" |
| 1975 | "When I Wanna" b/w "I Won't Brand You" | – | – | Change |
| 1976 | "L.A. Freeway" b/w "Standing Room Only" | – | – | Change |
