= MullMuzzler =

Progressive metal band

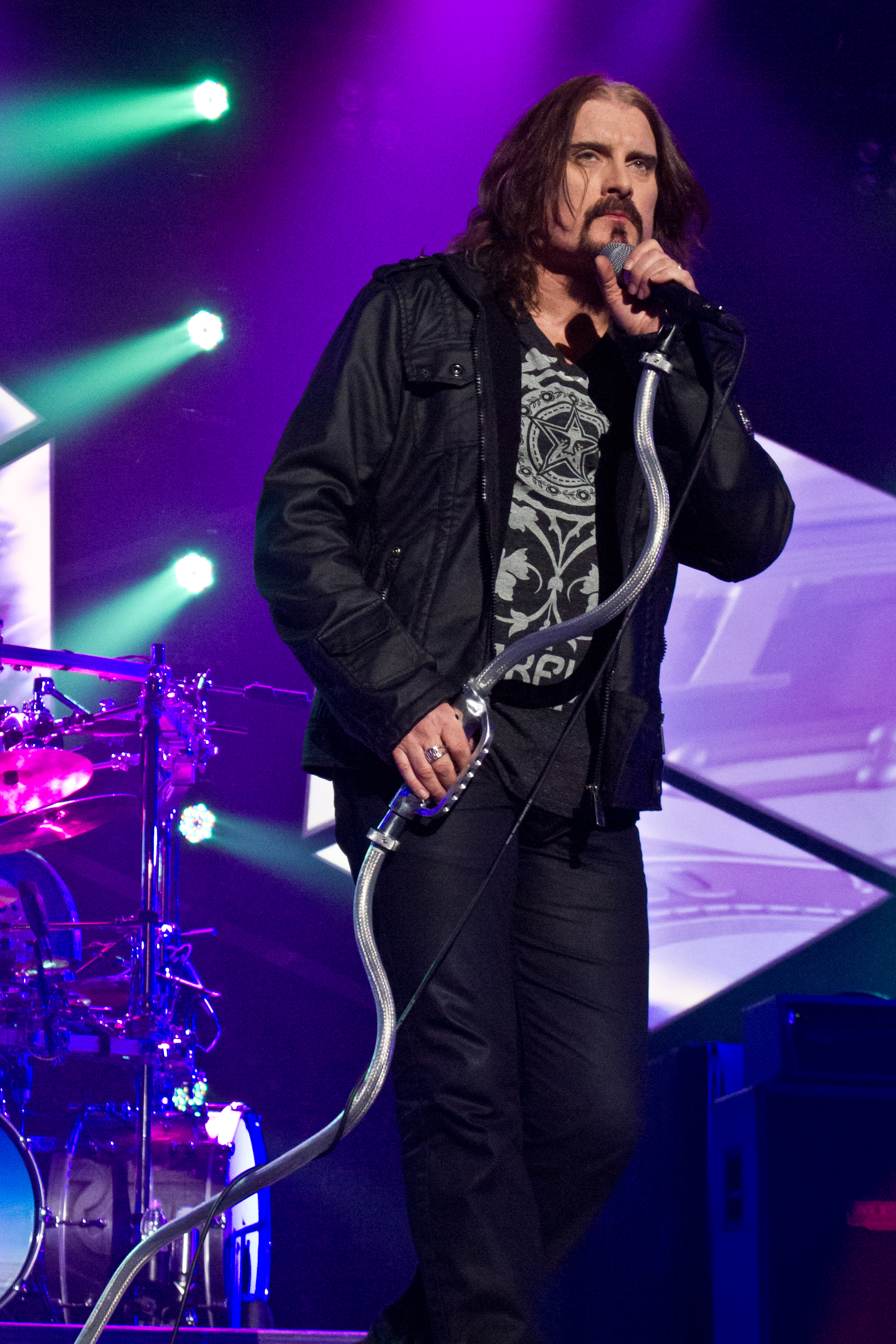
- Vocalist James LaBrie

Background information
- Origin: Canada/United States
- Genres: Progressive metal
- Years active: 1999–present
- Labels: Magna Carta
- Past members: (see below)

James LaBrie (formally MullMuzzler or James LaBrie's MullMuzzler) is the progressive metal solo project by James LaBrie, the lead singer of Dream Theater, before recording under his own name in 2005. The record company would not allow LaBrie to use his own name, so he created the name of MullMuzzler. LaBrie coined the word MullMuzzler and defined it as: to gag or silence an individual's thought before it can be expressed in any manner. For the follow-up, he negotiated the right to use his name although still unable to simply credit it as his solo album.

== Members ==
=== Current members ===
- James LaBrie – clean vocals (1999–present)
- Matt Guillory – keyboards, vocals (1999–present)
- Marco Sfogli – guitar (2005–present)
- Peter Wildoer – drums, harsh vocals (2010–present)
- Ray Riendeau – bass (2010–present)

=== Former members ===
- Mike Keneally – guitar (1999–2005)
- Bryan Beller – bass (1999–2005)
- Mike Mangini – drums (1999–2005)
- Andy DeLuca – bass (2005–2010)
- John Macaluso – drums (2005–2010)

== Discography ==
- Keep It to Yourself – 1999
- MullMuzzler 2 – 2001
- Elements of Persuasion – 2005
- Prime Cuts – 2008
- Static Impulse – 2010
- Impermanent Resonance – 2013
- Beautiful Shade of Grey – 2022
