= Christofer Malmström =

Swedish death metal guitarist

- Born: 14 May 1973 (age 52)
- Origin: Höganäs
- Genres: Melodic death metal
- Occupations: Musician, songwriter, producer
- Label: Nuclear Blast
- Website: darkane.com

Erik Einar Christofer Malmström is a Swedish lead guitarist and founder of the band Darkane. He also plays the guitar in Non-Human Level. He used to play in Zaninez and Demise.

== Equipment ==
- Ibanez Guitars
- Seymour Duncan Pickups
- D'Addario Strings
- Steve Clayton picks

== Darkane ==
- Rusted Angel
- Insanity
- Expanding Senses
- Layers of Lies
- Demonic Art
- The Sinister Supremacy
- Inhuman Spirits
