= Layers of Live =

Live album / Video by Darkane
- Released: 19 July 2010
- Genre: Melodic death metal, thrash metal
- Label: Listenable

Darkane chronology
Demonic Art (2008)	Layers of Live (2010)	The Sinister Supremacy (2013)

Layers of Live is a live album by Darkane. The title of this release is a reference to their 2005 album Layers of Lies.

== Track listing ==
The Tivoli, Helsingborg (4 May 2006)
No.	Title	Album	Length
1.	"Amnesia of the Wildoerian Apocalypse"	Layers Of Lies	1:41
2.	"Godforsaken Universe"	Layers Of Lies	4:11
3.	"Emanation of Fear"	Insanity	4:35
4.	"July 1999"	Rusted Angel	4:10
5.	"Fatal Impact"	Expanding Senses	3:44
6.	"Layers of Lies"	Layers Of Lies	4:30
7.	"Organic Canvas"	Layers Of Lies	5:02
8.	"Violence from Within"	Expanding Senses	4:22
9.	"Third"	Insanity	4:04
10.	"Chaos vs Order"	Expanding Senses	5:03
11.	"Convicted"	Rusted Angel	5:28
12.	"Secondary Effects"	Layers Of Lies	4:08
13.	"Innocence Gone"	Expanding Senses	4:47
14.	"Inverted Spheres"	Insanity	1:45

Live at Dunkers Kulturhus (21 August 2002)
No.	Title	Album	Length
15.	"Parasites of the Unexplained"	Expanding Senses	4:12
16.	"Rape of Mankind"	Rusted Angel	5:19
17.	"A Wisdoms Breed"	Rusted Angel	3:28
18.	"Submission"	Expanding Senses	5:24

Live at The Tivoli (5 November 2002)
No.	Title	Album	Length
19.	"Rusted Angel"	Rusted Angel	6:35
20.	"Solitary Confinement"	Expanding Senses	4:49

Live at Sweden Rock Festival (7 June 2003)
No.	Title	Album	Length
21.	"Hostile Phantasm"	Insanity	5:49

Live at Rock Hard Festival (8 June 2003)
No.	Title	Album	Length
22.	"Distress"	Insanity	3:44

Live at Gta Kllare (17 March 2003)
No.	Title	Album	Length
23.	"Chaos vs Order"	Expanding Senses	5:22

Drum Clinic with Peter Wildoer Live at The Tivoli 2006
No.	Title	Album	Length
24.	"Organic Canvas"	Layers Of Lies	4:47

Other Material

- A 40 min "in the studio" documentary.
- A 45 min "on the road" documentary.

== Credits ==
Darkane

- Peter Wildoer - drums
- Christofer Malmström - lead guitar
- Klas Ideberg - rhythm guitar
- Jörgen Löfberg - bass guitar
- Andreas Sydow - vocals
