= Keep It to Yourself =

Keep It to Yourself may refer to:

- Keep It to Yourself (album), by MullMuzzler
- "Keep It to Yourself" (Kacey Musgraves song)
