= Dark Deceiver =

Studio album by Zero Hour
- Released: 2008
- Genre: Progressive metal
- Length: 44:41
- Label: Sensory

Zero Hour chronology
Specs of Pictures Burnt Beyond (2006)	Dark Deceiver (2008)	Agenda 21 (2022)

Professional ratings
Review scores
Source	Rating
AllMusic	3/5
laut.de	4/5
Metal.de	8/10
Powermetal.de	8.5/10
Rock Hard	7.5/10

Dark Deceiver is the fifth album by American progressive metal band Zero Hour. It was released in 2008.

== Critical reception ==
Vampster said the album is the band's strongest since The Towers of Avarice.

== Track listing ==
1. Power to Believe – 7:07
2. Dark Deceiver – 3:56
3. Inner Spirit – 12:19
4. Resurrection - 3:18
5. Tendonitis - 1:19
6. The Temple Within - 6:13
7. Lies – 3:20
8. The Passion Of Words – 4:32
9. Severed Angel (Instrumental) – 2:37

== Credits ==
- Chris Salinas - vocals
- Jasun Tipton - guitars
- Troy Tipton - Bass
- Mike Guy - drums
