= A Fragile Mind =

Studio album by Zero Hour
- Released: September 20, 2005
- Genre: Progressive metal
- Length: 44:05
- Label: Sensory

Zero Hour chronology
Metamorphosis (2003)	A Fragile Mind (2005)	Specs of Pictures Burnt Beyond (2006)

Professional ratings
Review scores
Source	Rating
AllMusic	3.5/5
Powermetal.de	9/10
Rock Hard	8/10

A Fragile Mind is the third studio album by American progressive metal band Zero Hour, released on September 20, 2005.

== Critical reception ==
AllMusic wrote: "For prog metal with a power metal edge, A Fragile Mind is the album to beat in 2005." Vampster said A Fragile Mind is the band's most atmospheric album. Rock Hard said the album is more accessible than its predecessor. They noted that The Towers of Avarice is still a slightly better album. Powermetal.de recommended the tracks "There for Me", "Destiny Is Sorrow", "Losing Control", and "A Fragile Mind".

== Track listing ==
No.	Title	Length
1.	"Intro"	0:06
2.	"There for Me"	4:37
3.	"Destiny Is Sorry"	8:00
4.	"Brain Surgery"	3:12
5.	"Losing Control"	3:45
6.	"Twice the Pain"	4:20
7.	"Somnecrophobia"	3:09
8.	"A Fragile Mind"	11:33
9.	"Intrinsic"	5:23
