= Hyste'riah =

Swedish metal band

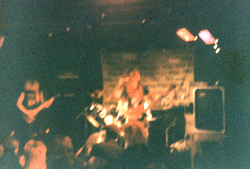

Background information
- Origin: Landskrona, Sweden
- Genres: Thrash metal, metallic hardcore
- Years active: 1987–1989
- Label: To the Death Records

Hyste'riah was a Swedish thrash metal / metallic hardcore band that originated in Landskrona, Sweden, in 1987.

Typical for the band's music was staccato-type playing technique, shredding guitar riffs, fast-fingered distorted bass parts and drum play in 6/8 rhythm. The name Hyste'riah was taken from a leftover track title from a previous band and had nothing to do with Def Leppard's album Hysteria.

== History ==
Hyste'riah was formed by bassplayer J. B. Krown (from D.T.A.L.), drummer T. C. Hagen and guitarist Cliff T (later in Darkane and Terror 2000) at a local music festival in Landskrona. The band soon recorded the four-song cassette Attempt the Life which sold worldwide. These four songs brought Hyste'riah a lot of attention from underground zines and contact from the label Wild Rags in Montebello, California.

Drummer problems resulted that the recording of what became the Jeremiad of the Living four-song cassette was done as a two-piece act. This did not stop the band from writing more music. Wild Rags, who sold about 10% of their tapes now offered them a deal for their upcoming four-song 12-inch single.

Late in 1989, Hyste'riah joined forces with the remains of Helsingborg thrashers GOD. B. C. The result was a softer, doomier and more technical sound which made an end to their thrashy hardcore signum. The offered deal with Wild Rags was (for unknown reasons) rejected by some members in the new line-up and instead the band signed for Hellhound Records under their new name Hyste'riah G.B.C.

In 2016, the recordings from 1987 and 1988 were freshened up in Darkane studios and re-released by To The Death Records.

== Members ==
- J. B. Krown – bass, vocals, drums (1987–1989)
- Cliff. T – lead guitar, vocals, bass (1987–1989)
- T. C. Hagen – drums (1987–1988)

== Discography ==
=== CC ===
- Attempt the Life (1987)
- Jeremiad of the Living (1988)
- Hymns of the Dead Vol 1 (1989)

=== Albums ===
- Hyste'riah (2016)
