= Metamorphosis (Zero Hour album) =

Studio album by Zero Hour
- Released: July 22, 2003
- Recorded: 1999
- Genre: Progressive metal
- Length: 53:35
- Label: Sensory

Zero Hour chronology
The Towers of Avarice (2001)	Metamorphosis (2003)	A Fragile Mind (2005)

Professional ratings
Review scores
Source	Rating
Babyblaue	11/15
DPRP	10/10 (Read); 8.5/10 (Dokter)
MetalReviews	82/100
Noise.fi	3/5
RevelationZ	8/10

Metamorphosis is a rerelease of Zero Hour's eponymous debut album.

== Critical reception ==
Powermetal.de gave a positive review and said some of the keyboard parts resemble When Dream and Day Unite-era Dream Theater. Noise.fi said the album sounds like Dream Theater, although the vocals are not as good. One of the reviewers for DPRP called the album "A truly stunning work". Another said: "This is original, well composed, superbly played progmetal." Metallian wrote: "Much like the bands heroes, Dream Theater, Metamorphosis is an accomplished, calculated and precise progressive album." Babyblaue highlighted the track "Eyes of Denial".

== Track listing ==
1. "Eyes of Denial" – 4:42
2. "The System Remains" – 7:22
3. "Rebirth" – 5:49
4. "Voice of Reason" – 8:40
5. "A Passage" – 2:25
6. "I. Descent" – 3:45
7. "II. Awaken" – 4:33
8. "III. Union" – 5:44
9. "IV. Solace" – 1:03
10. "V. Ascent" – 2:01
11. "Eyes of Denial" (Demo Version) – 3:57
12. "Jaded Eyes" (Demo Version) – 3:29

== Personnel ==
- Erik Rosvold – vocals
- Jasun Tipton – guitars
- Troy Tipton – Bass
- Mike Guy – drums
- Matt Guillory – keyboards
- Phillip Bennett – keyboards
- Brittany Tipton – Female vocals
