= Rusted Angel =

Studio album by Darkane
- Released: 22 February 1999
- Recorded: August – September 1998
- Genre: Melodic death metal, thrash metal
- Length: 38:18
- Label: Relapse

Darkane chronology
Rusted Angel (1999)	Insanity (2001)

Professional ratings
Review scores
Source	Rating
AllMusic	3/5 stars

Rusted Angel is the debut album by Swedish metal band Darkane. This was the only Darkane album with Lawrence Mackrory until his return in mid-2011. The song "July 1999" is about one Nostradamus prediction.

== Track listing ==
All tracks are written by Malmström and Wildoer.

No.	Title	Length
1.	"Intro"	1:22
2.	"Convicted"	4:00
3.	"Bound"	4:38
4.	"Rape of Mankind"	3:59
5.	"Rusted Angel"	6:28
6.	"A Wisdoms Breed"	3:27
7.	"Chase for Existence"	5:04
8.	"The Arcane Darkness"	1:04
9.	"July 1999"	4:07
10.	"Frenetic Visions"	6:33
11.	"Relief in Disguise" (Regain reissue and Japanese bonus track)	1:06
12.	"Convicted (Live in Helsingborg, October 30, 1998, at The Tivoli)" (Regain reissue bonus track)	4:26
13.	"A Wisdoms Breed (Live in Helsingborg, October 30, 1998, at The Tivoli)" (Regain reissue bonus track)	3:47

== Personnel ==
=== Darkane ===
- Christofer Malmström – lead guitar
- Peter Wildoer – drum kit
- Jörgen Löfberg – bass guitar
- Klas Ideberg – rhythm guitar
- Lawrence Mackrory – vocals

=== Production ===
- Wez Wenedikter – executive producer
- Daniel Bergstrand – production, engineering, mixing
- Peter In de Betou – mastering
- Chad Michael Ward – artwork
