= The Bristles =

Punk band

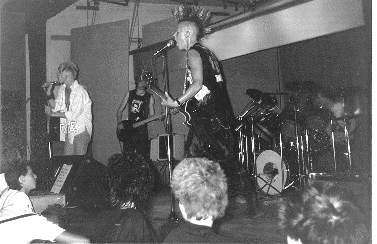
- The Bristles performing in 1983 in Uddevalla, Swe. Left to right: Puma, Ingemar, Svegis & Lankan.

Background information
- Origin: Landskrona, Sweden
- Genre: Punk rock
- Years active: 1982–1985, 1996, 2008–present
- Labels: Heptown Records, Hot Stuff, Aftermath Tapes, Majken Records, Pike Records, Civilisation Records, Rosa Honung
- Members: Svegis; Ingemar; Ray; Tobbe; Pascal
- Past members: Nelle; Rotcher; Viking; Lankan; Groll; Malwin; Harri; Puma
- Website: thebristles.wordpress.com

The Bristles is a raw punk band formed in 1982 in Landskrona, Sweden. The name comes from GBH.

The band formed in the beginning of the second wave of punk, influenced by bands like The Exploited and developed from punk with Oi!-influences to a raw punk band (in Swedish, råpunk). Together with Swedish bands like Asta Kask, Sötlimpa, Existenz, Moderat Likvidation, Noncens, EATER, Anti Cimex and many others the Bristles were the new breed of fast playing bands that released mostly singles, and did a lot of gigging. The band broke up in 1985.

The band briefly reunited in 1996, and later in 2008. In 2009 the EP Union Bashing State was out. In 2010 the album Reflections of the Bourgeois Society is released. It contains 11 tracks. In 2012, the band's second album, Bigger than Punk, was released. In 2014 the tape "Val?" is released. In 2015, the band's third album, Last Days of Capitalism was released. In 2017 a split 7-inch single was out with Rövsvett. In 2019 the EP "Live at Insikten, Kulturhuset Jönköping 20180901" was out.

== History ==
=== Early days (1982–1985) ===
The Bristles formed in 1982, influenced by the second punk wave with bands like The Exploited and the Oi!-movement. From the beginning, it was a five-piece band. Svegis-Guitar, Nelle-guitar, Rotcher-bass, Lankan-drums, and Viking-vocals. Nelle left the band early to form D.T.A.L. Rotcher left after the Don’t Give Up EP was recorded. He was replaced by Ingemar. The Don't Give Up EP was released in the beginning of 1983.

Soon after the release of the Don't Give Up EP, Viking had to leave the band. He was replaced by Puma from Black Uniforms who had split up a couple of months before. The band now took another musical direction, dropping the Oi!-influences in favour for merely raw punk.

In the fall of 1983, the Ban the Punk Shops tape was released. It contained mostly old songs re-recorded with Puma on vocals. In the summer of 1984 the band broke up just to shortly after reform with a new drummer, Groll, replacing Lankan. During this period, the Boys will be Boys EP was released. Lankan now joined D.T.A.L.

In 1984 the band appeared on the Welcome to 1984-compilation Maximumrocknroll with the song Don't Give Up. The record made the band known around the world.

The band recorded four new songs in Stockholm in 1985 that were supposed to be a new EP released by Rosa Honung Records. Instead the band broke up again due to musical differences fuelled with drug issues. The band had said that the argument of musical direction was typical at the time, when the second punk wave was dying, and some wanted to play harder and others wanted to play more punk rock a la 77.

=== Briefly reunited (1996) ===
The band briefly reunited in 1996 to play at Bollnäs-punken. Malwin from Svegis' band The Skalatones played drums. A permanent reunion weren't possible cos' of Svegis and Malvins engagement in the Skalatones.

=== Reunion (2008–present) ===
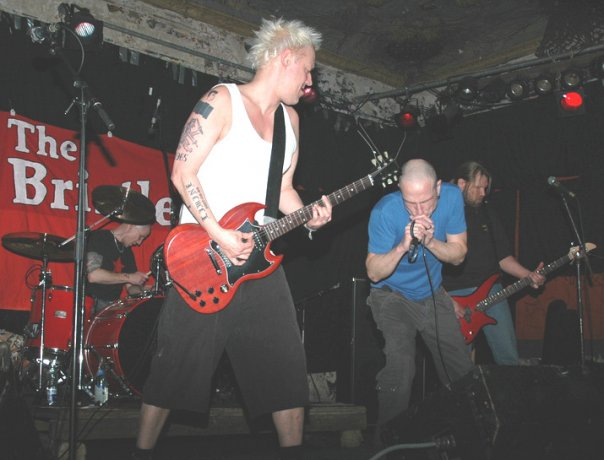
The Bristles 2010, Live in Köpi, Berlin Left to right: Ray (drums), Svegis (guitar), Puma (voice), Ingemar (bass)

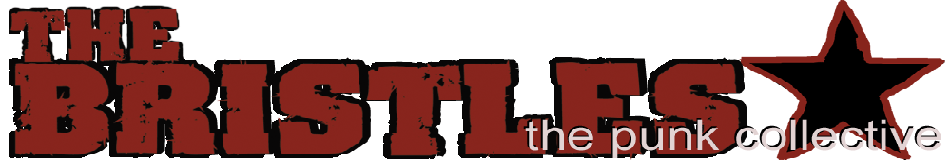

The Bristles "The End"
The Bristles "The End" from Bigger Than Punk Album (2012)

The Bristles "Bristles Song"
The Bristles "Bristles Song" from Don't Give Up 7-inch EP (1983)

The Bristles reformed after the making of the compilation No Future in the Past. Harri from Svegis' band The Negatives became the new drummer. In 2009 the Union Bashing State EP was released. Soon after, Harri left the band. He was replaced by Ray.

In 2010 the album Reflections of the Bourgeois Society was released. In 2011 the band releases Beväpna er/Were only in it for the drugs no. 2, two songs of the Swedish band Ebba Grön. According to the press release, it was "a fuck off to the Swedish right wing government", as a digital single. Shortly thereafter it's also released on vinyl 7”. The release included a paper describing the political rights first four years in power in Sweden, 2006-2010, exposing the politics of benefit the wealthy at the expense of less well-off.

In 2012 the album Bigger Than Punk was released. In 2015 The Bristles released the album Last Days of Capitalism. In late 2016 Puma left the band, and Tobbe from Moderat Likvidation became the band's singer. In 2018 Pascal joined as the band's second singer. A split single with Rövsvett was also released. In 2019, the single Stukad was released.

== Members ==
Current members

- Svegis – guitar (1982–1985, 1996, 2008–present)
- Ingemar – bass (1982–1985, 1996, 2008–present)
- Tobbe – voice (2015–present (Moderat Likvidation in the 80's)
- Ray – drums (2009–present)
- Pascal – voice (2018–present)

Former members

- Nelle – guitar (1982)
- Rotcher – bass (1982)
- Viking – vocals (1982)
- Lankan – drums (1982–1984)
- Groll – drums (1984–1985)
- Malwin – drums (1996)
- Harri – drums (2008–2009)
- Puma – voice (1982–1985, 1996, 2008–2016)

== Discography ==
- Don't Give Up 7-inch EP (Punx and Skins Records, 1983)
- Ban the Punk Shops Tape (Ägg Tapes, 1983)
- Boys will be Boys 7-inch EP (Rockin Rebels Records, 1984)
- Ban the Punk Shops Tape re-issue (Jungle Hop International, 1985)
- Union Bashing State CD EP (MCR, 2009)
- Reflections of the Bourgeois Society CD/LP (Switchlight Records, Anarkopunx, Noise of Sweden, 2010)
- Beväpna er/We're only in it for the drugs no. 2 Digi/7" single (Bristles Records/Hot Stuff, 2011)
- Bigger than Punk CD/LP (Switchlight Records, Turist i Tillvaron, Noise of Sweden, Heptown Records, 2012)
- Schlagers Christmas single DIGITAL (Bristles Records, 2013)
- Val? EP Tape (Majken Records, 2014)
- Ban the Punk Shops Tape re-issue (Aftermath Tapes, 2015)
- Last Days Of Capitalism CD/LP, (Heptown Records, Civilisation Records, Pike Records, 2015)
- Split Single with Rövsvett (Heptown Records, Just 4 For Fun, Civilisation Records, Pike RecordsEP 2018)
- Live at Insikten, Kulturhuset Jönköping 20180901 (Bristles Records EP 2019)
- Stukad (Bristles Records Single 2019)

== Compilations ==
- No Future in the Past (the best and the rest) 2CD's + DVD (MCR, 2008)
- No Future in the Past (the best and the rest) Part 1 LP (Noise & Distortion, 2008)

== Other appearances ==
- Welcome to 1984 LP (Maximumrocknroll 1984) "Don't Give Up"
- Really Fast Vol. 2 LP (Really Fast Records 1985) "Nowhere"
- We don't need your nuclear force LP (Records 1986) "War Heroes", "1984 Part II"
- Varning för punk 3CD's (Distortion Records 1994) "Bristles Song", "Sick"
- Really Fast 1-3 2CD's (Really Fast Records 2000) "Nowhere"
- Svenska Punkklassiker Vol. 2" CD (MNW 2007) “Don’t Give Up”
- Landskrona CD 2007 "Landskrona Song"
- Dimmorna skingras vol 2 LP (Pike Records 2012) "Checkpoint Sweden", "A Prayer for the Employer"
- Dimmorna skingras vol4 LP

== Bibliography ==
- Ny Våg - Svensk Punk/New Wave/Synth 1977-1982 by Peter Kagerland (2012)
- The encyclopedia of Swedish punk 1977-1987 by Peter Jandreus (2008)
