= There's Hope =

Studio album by Marco Sfogli
- Released: February 15, 2008
- Recorded: Sfoley Studios; Work in Progress Studios; D-City Studios in Huntington Station, New York; Alex Argento's home studio in Palermo, Sicily; Elijah's Bite Studios in San Francisco, California
- Genre: Instrumental rock, progressive metal
- Length: 48:55
- Label: Lion

Marco Sfogli chronology
There's Hope (2008)	reMarcoble (2012)

There's Hope is the first studio album by guitarist Marco Sfogli, released on February 15, 2008, through Lion Music.

== Track listing ==
No.	Title	Length
1.	"Still Hurts"	5:02
2.	"Andromeda"	6:30
3.	"Seven"	5:01
4.	"There's Hope"	4:00
5.	"Spread the Disease"	4:07
6.	"Farewell"	3:49
7.	"Sunset Lights"	5:38
8.	"Genius"	4:48
9.	"Never Forgive Me"	4:10
10.	"Memories"	3:37
11.	"Texas BBQ"	2:13
Total length:		48:55

== Personnel ==
- Marco Sfogli – guitar, keyboard (tracks 1–3, 7), bass (tracks 5–7, 11), mixing, production
- Matt Guillory – keyboard solo (tracks 1, 7)
- Emanuele Casali – keyboard solo (track 2)
- Alex Argento – keyboard (track 8), keyboard solos (tracks 3, 5, 8)
- Fabio Tommasone – piano
- Salvyo Maiello – drums (tracks 1, 2, 7–9)
- John Macaluso – drums (tracks 3, 4)
- Ennio Giannone – drums (tracks 5, 6)
- Raffaele Natale – drums (track 11)
- Andrea Casali – bass (tracks 1, 2, 4, 8, 9)
- Dino Fiorenza – bass (track 3)
- Enzo Foniciello – engineering
- Marco Riccardo Musco – engineering
- Richard Chycki – mixing
- Enzo Rizzo – mastering
