= Concerto in True Minor =

Studio album by True Symphonic Rockestra
- Released: March 28, 2008
- Genre: Classical crossover
- Length: 46:32
- Label: Brainrox Records / Marinsound Rec
- Producer: Dirk Ulrich

Concerto in True Minor is the only studio release of the metal and opera collaboration project True Symphonic Rockestra. It was released on March 28, 2008.

== Track listing ==
1. "Nessun Dorma" - 3:05
2. "My Way" - 1:36
3. "Moon River" - 1:22
4. "Singin' in the Rain" - 1:31
5. "Granada" - 3:10
6. "Tu, Ca Nun Chiagne" - 3:47
7. "Ochi Tchorniye" - 0:16 (instrumental)
8. "Memories" - 1:29
9. "Cielito Lindo" - 1:35
10. "Tonight" - 1:04
11. "Libiamo Ne' Lieti Calici" - 3:15
12. "La Donna E Mobile" - 1:48
13. "Non Ti Scordar Di Me" - 3:51
14. "'O Sole Mio" - 2:42
15. "Dein ist mein ganzes Herz" - 2:24
16. "With a Song in My Heart" - 2:39
17. "Dorogoi Dlinnoyu" - 3:16
18. "America" - 1:09
19. "Funiculì, Funiculà" - 1:59
20. "Brazil" - 1:29
21. "Pourquoi Me Reveiller" - 3:05

== Credits ==
=== Vocals ===
- James LaBrie - Rock Tenor
- Vladimir Grishko - Opera Tenor
- Thomas Dewald - Opera Tenor

=== Musicians ===
- Dirk Ulrich - Guitar
- Christopher Jesidero - Violin
- Sandro Martinez - Guitar
- Paul Mayland - drums
- Marvin Philippi - Bass
