= Elements of Persuasion =

Studio album by James LaBrie
- Released: March 29, 2005
- Recorded: 2004–2005
- Genre: Alternative metal, progressive metal
- Length: 66:38
- Label: Inside Out
- Producer: James LaBrie, Matt Guillory

James LaBrie chronology
MullMuzzler 2 (2001)	Elements of Persuasion (2005)	Static Impulse (2010)

Professional ratings
Review scores
Source	Rating
Allmusic	3/5 stars

Elements of Persuasion, released March 29, 2005, is Dream Theater singer James LaBrie's first solo album under his name and his third solo project, with his first two being Keep It to Yourself and MullMuzzler 2, which were released under his band MullMuzzler.

LaBrie hired new musicians, including guitarist Marco Sfogli from Italy and Richard Chycki as sound engineer. Despite the lineup change, the album maintains the same general style used on the previous two albums, albeit with a much heavier sound. This is the last of LaBrie's solo albums to feature drummer Mike Mangini, who would join Dream Theater five years later.

== Concept and making ==
Elements of Persuasion was written over a period of two years, primarily by James LaBrie and keyboardist Matt Guillory, with production occurring whenever LaBrie had "downtime" from Dream Theater or other obligations. The pair would start constructing songs together and then independently grow and evolve those works. This process was facilitated by exchanging MP3s back and forth.

They aimed to produce a "very aggressive and heavy album" focused on vocal melodies and lyrics. The lyrics address a range of issues, from organized religion to dictatorial oppression. LaBrie explains that Elements of Persuasion represents the various factors that guide us throughout our lives and how, at different stages, certain things become significantly more important than others.

== Influences ==
LaBrie cites several bands as influences for Elements of Persuasion, including Mudvayne, Meshuggah, Linkin Park, and Sevendust. He remarks, "Those bands were saying something to us, and I like the way they were approaching their music. I thought it was refreshing, intelligently done, and just had a feel of its own." The direct influences of these bands can be heard in songs like "Lost," which features a jazz-fusion vibe, and "Smashed," which incorporates a piano melody inspired by Bruce Hornsby. Indirect influences include literature that LaBrie reads, social issues, personal observations, and the dynamics within relationships.

== Confusion with Octavarium ==
Dream Theater's eighth studio album, Octavarium, and LaBrie's Elements of Persuasion were both released in 2005, with fans eagerly anticipating each release. Elements of Persuasion was leaked prior to its official release by Mike Portnoy and was intentionally mislabeled as Octavarium. Because the album featured LaBrie's vocals, many fans mistakenly believed the leak to be a Dream Theater album, which led to confusion among some fans at concerts and even caused some DJs to play incorrectly labeled tracks.

== Track listing ==
All lyrics are written by James LaBrie except where noted.

No.	Title	Music	Length
1.	"Crucify" (lyrics by Matt Guillory)	James LaBrie, Matt Guillory	6:01
2.	"Alone" (lyrics by Guillory)	LaBrie, Guillory	5:37
3.	"Freaks"	LaBrie, Guillory, Brian Wherry	5:29
4.	"Invisible"	LaBrie, Guillory, Wherry	5:37
5.	"Lost" (lyrics by Guillory)		3:41
6.	"Undecided"	LaBrie, Guillory, Wherry	5:31
7.	"Smashed"	LaBrie, Guillory	5:34
8.	"Pretender"	LaBrie, Guillory, Wherry	5:33
9.	"Slightly Out of Reach"	LaBrie, Guillory	6:11
10.	"Oblivious"	LaBrie, Guillory, Wherry	5:23
11.	"In Too Deep"	LaBrie, Guillory	6:56
12.	"Drained"	LaBrie, Guillory	5:10
Total length:			1:06:43

Japanese edition bonus track
No.	Title	Music	Length
13.	"Understand"	LaBrie, Guillory	4:36
Total length:			1:11:19

== Personnel ==
- James LaBrie – vocals
- Marco Sfogli – lead and rhythm guitars
- Matt Guillory – keyboards
- Bryan Beller – bass
- Mike Mangini – drums

=== Production ===
- Arranged and produced by James LaBrie and Matt Guillory
- Drums recorded at Iguana Recording Studios; vocals, keyboards, and all guitars recorded at Cawaja Sound
- Vocals, guitars, keyboards, and drums recorded by Richard Chycki; assistant drum engineer Steve Chahley, with second engineer Tom Wilson
- Bass recorded at Ear Kandy Studios by Edmund Monsef
- Mixed by Richard Chycki
- All songs published by Bug Music
