= Insanity (album) =

Studio album by Darkane
- Released: 6 March 2001 (US); 30 April 2001 (Rest of the World); 12 December 2011 (Reissue); 10 January 2012 (Poland Reissue)
- Recorded: at War Studios, Helsingborg (Drums, Choir and Additional Music) and Dug-Out Productions, Uppsala (All other Recordings) in May–July 2000
- Genre: Melodic death metal, thrash metal
- Length: 48:50
- Label: Nuclear Blast; Century Media Records; Metal Mind Productions
- Producer: Daniel Bergstrand

Darkane chronology
Rusted Angel (1999)	Insanity (2001)	Expanding Senses (2002)

Professional ratings
Review scores
Source	Rating
AllMusic	2.5/5 stars

Insanity is the second full-length studio album from melodic death metal band Darkane, released on March 6, 2001. It is the first Darkane album with Andreas Sydow in the band. The album's name came from the chaotic events that happened while recording the album such as a storm that caused a power outage. The opening track "Calamitas" got it name from the Latin word for "loss".

== Track listing ==
All music is composed by Malmström & Wildoer, except where noted.

No.	Title	Lyrics	Music	Length
1.	"Calamitas"	instrumental		2:40
2.	"Third"	Malmström	Malmström	3:59
3.	"Emanation of Fear"	Sydow		4:29
4.	"Impure Perfection"	Löfberg		3:09
5.	"Hostile Phantasm"	Wildoer		5:55
6.	"Psychic Pain"	Malmström		4:19
7.	"000111"	instrumental	Malmström	1:38
8.	"The Perverted Beast"	Wildoer	Ideberg	4:29
9.	"Distress"	Malmström		3:36
10.	"Inauspicious Coming"	Malmström		4:40
11.	"Pile of Hate"	Wildoer		8:16
12.	"Inverted Spheres"	instrumental	Malmström	1:43

Japan Bonus Track
No.	Title	Lyrics	Length
13.	"Convicted (Live)"	Malmström & Wildoer

== Credits ==
=== Darkane ===
- Andreas Sydow - vocals
- Christofer Malmström - lead guitar, choir vocals
- Klas Ideberg - rhythm guitar
- Jörgen Löfberg - bass guitar
- Peter Wildoer - drums
- Darkane - engineering, backing vocals

=== Other personnel ===
==== Additional musician ====
- Fredrik Thordendal - guitar solo on "Psychic Pain"

==== Album design ====
- Maximilian 'Evil Twin' - logo
- Thomas Ewerhard - artwork, layout design
- Stefan Ideberg - band photos

===== Production =====
- Peter in de Betou - mastering (at the Cutting Room, Stockholm)
- Daniel Bergstrand - engineering, audio mixing
- Wez Wenedikter - music executive

=== Classical participants ===
==== Classical musicians ====
- Thomas Widlund – timpani, percussion
- Joacim Wåhlstedt - french horn
- Lars Thapper - french horn
- Harry Ellström - double bass
- Markus Närvik - double bass
- Dan Hedborg - cello
- Håkan Westlund - cello
- Bo-Göte Nygren - viola
- Lisbeth Westberg - violin and viola
- Jonas Dahlman - violin

==== The Calamitas Choir ====
- Niclas Kåse – conductor
- Anette Westerholm
- Ann Skjelmose
- Camilla Grahn
- Catharina Müller
- Charlotte Olsson
- Hans Malmström
- Henrik Rosenberg
- Inger Jarlstedt
- Isabelle Malmström
- Jan Ahlgren
- Johan Engström
- Kajsa Åström
- Magnus Rosenberg
- Maria Andersson
- Martin Fröhberg
- Matias Steen
- Niclas Fröhberg
- Nils-Erik Rosdahl
- Richard Johansson
- Sofia Levin
- Susanne Kjellsson
- Sven Gudmundsson
- Therese Malmström
- Thomas Bursell
