= D.T.A.L. =

D.T.A.L
- Origin: Landskrona, Sweden
- Genres: Hardcore punk, death metal
- Years active: 1983–1990
- Labels: Atom-records, Really Fast Records, Chicken Brain Records, Egg Tapes & Records.

D.T.A.L. was a chaotic hardcore band formed in Landskrona, south Sweden, in 1983 by the multi-artist Nelle (previously in The Bristles). Their first 7"EP "Time To Die" was released in 1984 and was followed by the 7"EP "A Beautiful Day" in 1985. 1988 the band contributed on the compilation LP "Really Fast Vol. 4" from Really Fast Records, and 1990 the compilation EP "Hard, raw and fast" from "Chicken Brain Records". The band split-up shortly thereafter. Many different members where in and out over the years and the music evolved from hardcore punk to death metal. In 1994 three songs from the 7"EP "Time To Die" were reissued on the 3CD compilation "Varning For Punk" from "Egg Tapes & Records".

== Members ==
- Nelle – drums 83-84/ vocals 84–86. Earlier in The Bristles.
- Moe – guitar & vocals 83–90. Later in Odium, Warmonger, Mangler, The Negatives.
- Fredde – vocals 83–84
- Tuben – drums/vocals (on & off ´til) 89. Later in Hyste'riah G.B.C and The Bristles.
- Snutte – bass & guitar 83–85. Later in Hyste'riah (founder and a k a J.B.Krown) and Hyste'riah G.B.C.
- Lankan- drums 84–85. Earlier in The Bristles.
- PG – drums 86–90 Later in Warmonger.
- Ingemar – bass 86. Earlier and later in The Bristles.
- Pagen – bass 86–90 Later in Warmonger.
- Levin – guitar 87–89
- Gruva – keyboard 88–90
