= Zero Hour (band) =

American progressive metal band

- Origin: Pleasanton, California, United States
- Genres: Progressive metal
- Years active: 1993–2008, 2022–present
- Label: Sensory
- Members: Jasun Tipton; Troy Tipton; Mike Guy; Chris Salinas; Erik Rosvold; Mike Connor; Matt Guillory; Fred Marshall

Zero Hour is an American progressive metal band formed by twin brothers Jasun Tipton and Troy Tipton in Pleasanton, California, United States, in 1993. They released their self-titled debut album independently in 1999, and followed it up with 2001's The Towers of Avarice, their first album on the Sensory Records label, which also released all of their subsequent albums.

Following 2003's Metamorphosis (a re-recording of their first record), original singer Erik Rosvold was replaced by Fred Marshall, who appeared on A Fragile Mind, released in 2005. Vocalist Chris Salinas joined the band for their 2006 album Specs of Pictures Burnt Beyond, replacing Marshall. Salinas had previously fronted another progressive metal outfit, Power of Omens, which disbanded in 2005 after two albums. Salinas remained with Zero Hour until they disbanded.

The band was disbanded due to Troy Tipton's arm injury. Jasun Tipton stated "...he had the surgery and has been working hard to get back into playing shape. He’ll never be perfect but he’s gaining some strength in his arm and pushing forward. Much of the Zero Hour material Troy played with a lot of left hand strength. In Zero Hour there’s a lot of tapping and legato bass line in the material. Troy can’t and will not put his arm through those problems again as he still has issues." Jasun and Troy are now focusing on two new projects: the instrumental act Abnormal Thought Patterns and the vocally-driven Cynthesis.

== Members ==
- Jasun Tipton – guitars, keyboards
- Troy Tipton – bass
- Mike Guy – drums
- Chris Salinas – vocals
- Dino Alden - mixing
- Alan Douches - mastering
- Erik Rosvold – vocals, keyboards
- Fred Marshall – vocals
- Sean Kruithoff - guitar

== Discography ==
- 1999: Zero Hour (independent release)
- 2001: The Towers of Avarice
- 2003: Metamorphosis (Zero Hour re-release)
- 2005: A Fragile Mind
- 2006: Specs of Pictures Burnt Beyond
- 2008: Dark Deceiver
- 2022: Agenda 21
