= Terror 2000 =

Swedish thrash metal band

- Origin: Helsingborg, Sweden
- Genres: Thrash metal, melodic death metal
- Years active: 1999–present
- Labels: Nuclear Blast, Scarlet, SPV
- Members: Björn "Speed" Strid; Klas Ideberg; Nick Sword (Niklas Svärd); Erik Thyselius; Dan Svensson
- Past members: Henry Ranta
- Website: terror2000.net

Terror 2000 is a Swedish thrash metal band from Helsingborg.

== History ==
A side project of Soilwork singer Björn "Speed" Strid, the band includes guitarists Klas Ideberg of Darkane and Nick Sword of Von Benzo, drummer Erik Thyselius, and bassist Dan Svensson. The band was formed as "Killing Machine" in 1999. Original drummer Henry Ranta of Soilwork was replaced after the release of Slaughterhouse Supremacy.

== Critical reception ==
In a review of the band's album Terror for Sale, Decibel Magazine described the band's sound as "joke-rock" and stated that the album is "fun and rockin', but way too fun to really be all that rockin'". AllMusic was also critical, awarding the album two-and-a-half stars out of five and expressing disappointment that the band's "indistinctive neo-thrash songwriting" did not live up to the promise of its lyrics and energy.

== Band members ==
Current members

- Björn "Speed" Strid − vocals (Soilwork, ex-Darkane, Disarmonia Mundi, Coldseed)
- Klas Ideberg − guitars (The Defaced, Darkane, Hyste'riah, Hyste'riah G.B.C.)
- Nick Sword (Niklas Svärd) − guitars
- Erik Thyselius − drums (ex-Construcdead, ex-Face Down, Arize)
- Dan Svensson − bass (Hatelight)

Former members

- Henry Ranta − drums on Slaughterhouse Supremacy (ex-Soilwork, ex-The Defaced)

Guest musicians

- Von Benzo singer Jay Smith sang backup in one song from Terror for Sale: "King Kong Song".

== Discography ==
- Slaughterhouse Supremacy (2000) − Pavement Music
- Faster Disaster (2002) − Nuclear Blast
- Slaughter in Japan-Live 2003 (2003) − Scarlet Records
- Terror for Sale (2005) − Nuclear Blast
