= Specs of Pictures Burnt Beyond =

Studio album by Zero Hour
- Released: October 10, 2006
- Genre: Progressive metal
- Length: 43:08
- Label: Sensory

Zero Hour chronology
A Fragile Mind (2005)	Specs of Pictures Burnt Beyond (2006)	Dark Deceiver (2008)

Professional ratings
Review scores
Source	Rating
AllMusic	3.5/5
Rock Hard	8.5/10
Scream Magazine	5/6

Specs of Pictures Burnt Beyond is the fourth studio album by American progressive metal band Zero Hour, released on October 10, 2006.

== Critical reception ==
AllMusic concluded: "And for those who are not frightened away by that difficult, ultra-technical approach to prog metal, Specs of Pictures Burnt Beyond is a well executed, decent outing that underscores Zero Hour's ability to keep plugging away despite all their lineup changes." Vampster said the album is typical prog metal fare. Rock Hard said the band resembles a more extreme version of late-eighties Fates Warning. Powermetal.de recommended the tracks "Face the Fear, "The Falcon's Cry", and "I Am Here".

== Track listing ==
No.	Title	Length
1.	"Face the Fear"	9:00
2.	"The Falcon's Cry"	8:00
3.	"Embrace"	2:24
4.	"Specs of Pictures Burnt Beyond"	7:35
5.	"Zero Hour"	2:27
6.	"I Am Here"	4:58
7.	"Evidence of the Unseen"	8:44
