= True Symphonic Rockestra =

True Symphonic Rockestra (TSR)

Background information
- Origin: Germany
- Genres: Rock opera
- Years active: 2006–2008
- Labels: Brainrox Records Germany & Marinsound Russia
- Members: James LaBrie; Thomas Dewald; Volodymyr Hryshko; Dirk Ulrich; Christopher Jesidero; Sandro Martinez; Paul Mayland; Marvin Philippi
- Website: www.tsr-project.com

True Symphonic Rockestra was a musical collaboration project combining rock music and opera. The concept was to have three world-class singers to perform songs from the Three Tenors repertoire, combining operatic and heavy metal elements.

The project was founded in 2000 by artistic director and producer Dirk Ulrich, Dream Theater vocalist James LaBrie, and tenors Volodymyr Hryshko and Thomas Dewald.

Their album, Concerto in True Minor, was recorded in 2006. It was released on March 28, 2008. The release was a cooperation between Brainrox Records (Germany) & Marinsound Records (Russia), with Sony BMG taking care of distribution in Germany, Austria and Switzerland. It contains 21 songs.

== Personnel ==
=== Vocals ===
- James LaBrie - Rock Tenor
- Volodymyr Hryshko - Opera Tenor
- Thomas Dewald - Opera Tenor

=== Musicians ===
- Dirk Ulrich - Guitar
- Christopher Jesidero - Violin
- Sandro Martinez - Guitar
- Paul Mayland - drums
- Marvin Philippi - Bass
