= MullMuzzler 2 =

- Cover art by Dave McKean

Studio album by James LaBrie
- Released: September 11, 2001
- Studio: Waltz Audio (Boston, MA); M.I. Studios (Los Angeles, CA); Soundtek Studios (Campbell, CA); Power Plant Recording (Barrie, ON)
- Genre: Progressive metal
- Length: 52:34
- Label: Magna Carta
- Producer: James LaBrie

James LaBrie chronology
| Keep It to Yourself (1999) | MullMuzzler 2 (2001) | Elements of Persuasion (2005) |

Professional ratings
Review scores
| Source | Rating |
|---|---|
| Allmusic | 2.5/5 stars |

MullMuzzler 2 (also known as James LaBrie's MullMuzzler 2) is the second studio album by Dream Theater singer James LaBrie and his band MullMuzzler. It was released on September 11, 2001 through Magna Carta Records. This is LaBrie's last album to be released using his band name, as his subsequent album was released under LaBrie's solo name.

== Track listing ==
All tracks are written by James LaBrie and Matt Guillory, except where noted.

| No. | Title | Length |
|---|---|---|
| 1. | "Afterlife" (LaBrie, Trent Gardner) | 5:21 |
| 2. | "Venice Burning" (LaBrie, Carl Cadden-James, Gary Wehrkamp) | 6:26 |
| 3. | "Confronting the Devil" (LaBrie, Cadden-James, Wehrkamp) | 6:20 |
| 4. | "Falling" | 3:52 |
| 5. | "Stranger" | 6:32 |
| 6. | "A Simple Man" | 5:20 |
| 7. | "Save Me" | 4:11 |
| 8. | "Believe" | 5:00 |
| 9. | "Listening" | 4:14 |
| 10. | "Tell Me" | 5:14 |
| Total length: | | 52:34 |

== Personnel ==
- James LaBrie – vocals, production
- Trent Gardner – keyboard, spoken word
- Matt Guillory – keyboard, piano, sampling
- Mike Keneally – guitar
- Michael Borkosky – additional guitar
- Bryan Beller – bass
- Mike Mangini – drums, percussion
- Johnny Freeman – engineering
- Tom Waltz – engineering
- Victor Florencia – mixing
- Jim Brick – mastering
- Darko Boehringer – photography
