= Expanding Senses =

Studio album by Darkane
- Released: 2002
- Recorded: February–May 2002 Drums & Vocals (Dug Out Studios, Uppsala) Guitars & Bass (Not Quite Studio)
- Genre: Melodic death metal, thrash metal
- Length: 40:19
- Label: Nuclear Blast America
- Producer: Daniel Bergstrand, Darkane

Darkane chronology
Insanity (2001)	Expanding Senses (2002)	Layers of Lies (2005)

Professional ratings
Review scores
Source	Rating
AllMusic	4/5 stars

Expanding Senses is the third album from melodic death metal band Darkane.

It was released on 26 August 2002 in Europe, 4 September 2002 in Japan by Toy's Factory & 1 October 2002 in United States.

This the only Darkane album not to have the band's logo on the cover.

== Track listing ==
All music is composed by Malmström & Wildoer, except where noted.

No.	Title	Lyrics	Music	Length
1.	"Innocence Gone"	Ideberg	Ideberg	4:43
2.	"Solitary Confinement"	Wildoer		5:02
3.	"Fatal Impact"	Malmström		3:41
4.	"Imaginary Entity"	Wildoer		4:45
5.	"Violence from Within"	Wildoer		5:11
6.	"The Fear of One's Self"	Malmström	Ideberg	2:42
7.	"Chaos vs. Order"	Wildoer		4:47
8.	"Parasites of the Unexplained"	Malmström		3:54
9.	"Submission"	Wildoer		5:34

Japanese Bonus Track
No.	Title	Lyrics	Length
10.	"Growing Hate"	Wildoer	3:55

== Credits ==
Darkane

- Andreas Sydow - Vocals
- Klas Ideberg - Guitar
- Christofer Malmström - Guitar, Arranger
- Jörgen Löfberg - Bass
- Peter Wildoer - Drums, Mixing, Tabla

Guests

- Örjan Örnkloo - Sampling, Mixing, Keyboard Programming
- Daniel Bergstrand - Mixing
- Andy Siry - A&R
- Lawrence Mackrory - Additional vocals on "Chaos Vs. Order"
- Thomas Ewerhard - Artwork, Cover Art
- Thomas Eberger - Mastering
- Johan Larsson - Choir, Chorus, Model
- Lotta Alm - Choir, Chorus
- Mattias Svensson - Choir, Chorus
