= Matt Guillory =

American musician

- Born: January 16, 1974 (age 52); New York City
- Genres: heavy metal, progressive metal, neoclassical metal,
- Instruments: Keyboards, vocals, guitar
- Years active: 1993–present
- Label: Frontiers

Matt Guillory (born January 16, 1974) is an American musician. He mainly plays keyboards and tends to write progressive metal. He has often been compared to the Swedish keyboard player Jens Johansson, famous for his work in the power metal band Stratovarius. Matt Guillory has worked for Mike Varney, appearing on several mid 1990s records as session player. Guillory also works with James LaBrie, best known as Dream Theater's vocalist, as a composer and keyboardist on the singer's first five solo releases. He was one of the founding members of the Bay Area based progressive metal band Dali's Dilemma. Guillory is a long time user of the Roland JD-800 synthesizer, which he plugs into a Line 6 Pod amp modelling/effects unit and a wah pedal to create a more guitar-like tone for his lead sound.

== Discography ==
- Dali's Dilemma – Manifesto for Futurism
- Mogg/Way – Edge of the World – keyboards
- George Bellas – Turn of the Millennium – keyboard pads & keyboard solos
- George Bellas – Mind over Matter – keyboard solos
- John West – Mind Journey – keyboards
- James Murphy – Convergence – keyboards
- James Murphy – Feeding the Machine – keyboards
- Various Artists – Encores, Legends & Paradox: A tribute to the music of ELP – keyboards
- Explorers Club – Age of Impact – keyboards
- James LaBrie's MullMuzzler – Keep It to Yourself – keyboards, piano
- James LaBrie's MullMuzzler – MullMuzzler 2 – keyboards, piano, sampling
- James LaBrie – Elements of Persuasion – keyboards, additional guitar
- James LaBrie – Static Impulse – keyboards, backing vocals (Guillory also sang the lead vocals on the demo recordings for this album)
- James LaBrie – Impermanent Resonance – keyboards, background vocals
- Zero Hour – Zero Hour – keyboards
- Marco Sfogli – There's Hope
- dEMOTIONAL – My Heart – keyboards, production, lyrics
