= Cynthesis =

- Origin: Pleasanton, California, United States
- Genres: Progressive metal
- Years active: 2010-present
- Label: Sensory
- Members: Jasun Tipton; Troy Tipton; Mike Guy; Erik Rosvold; Sean Flanagan
- Website: www.zerohourweb.com

Cynthesis is an American progressive metal band from California that was formed by former Zero Hour members Jasun Tipton, Troy Tipton, Erik Rosvold and Enchant drummer Sean Flanagan. Vocalist Erik Rosvold sang on Zero Hour's first two studio albums, Metamorphosis and The Towers of Avarice before leaving the band. The first Cynthesis album, DeEvolution, saw him recording for the first time in over 10 years. The follow-up to DeEvolution, ReEvolution, came out in 2013.
