= James LaBrie =

Canadian singer (born 1963)

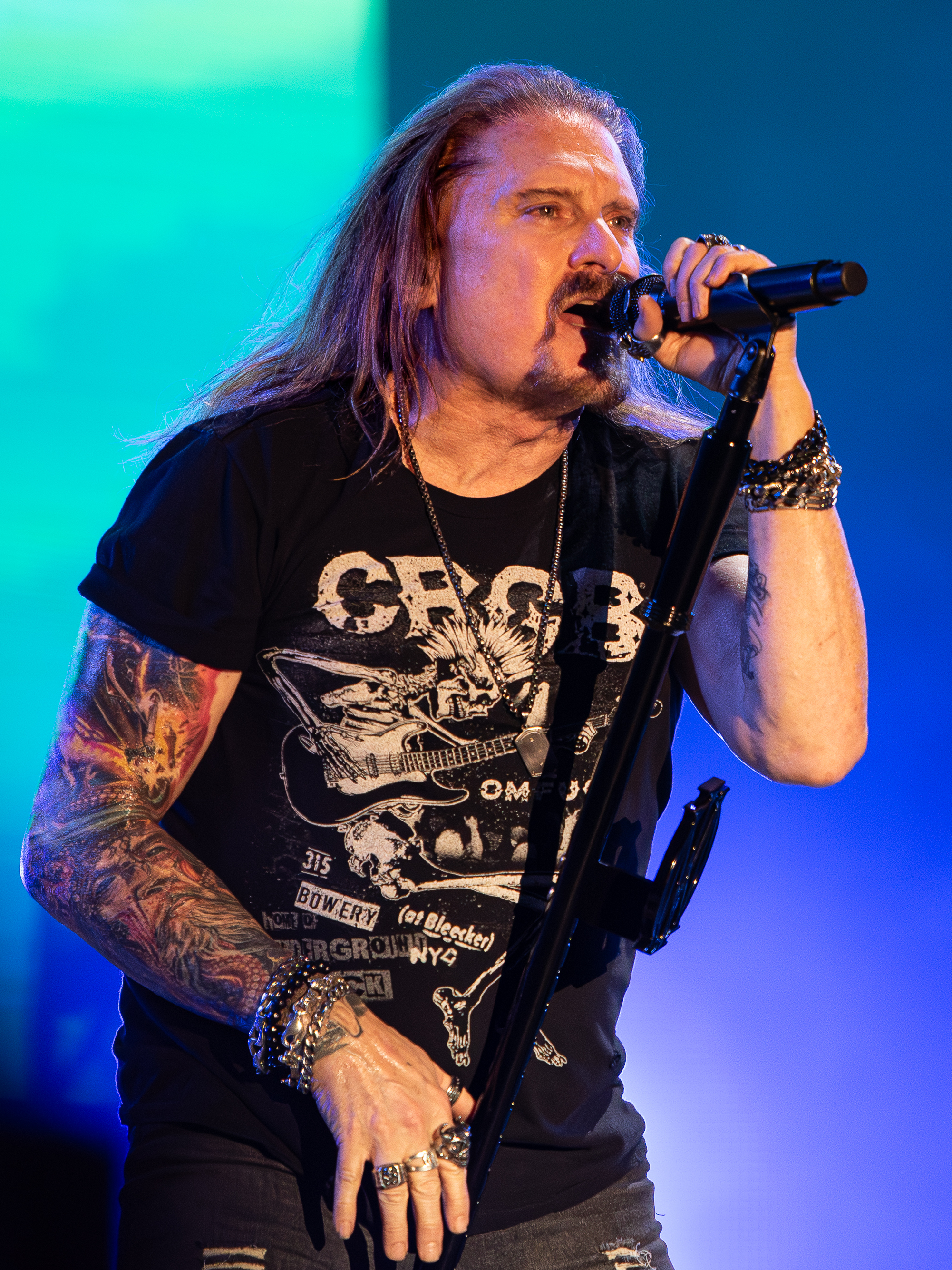
- LaBrie with Dream Theater in 2025

Background information
- Born: Kevin James LaBrie; May 5, 1963 (age 63); Penetanguishene, Ontario, Canada
- Genres: Progressive metal
- Occupations: Singer, songwriter
- Years active: 1986–present
- Labels: Roadrunner, Inside Out
- Member of: Dream Theater; MullMuzzler; True Symphonic Rockestra
- Formerly of: Winter Rose; Explorers Club; Nightmare Cinema
- Website: jameslabrie.com

Kevin James LaBrie (born May 5, 1963) is a Canadian singer, best known as the lead singer of the American progressive metal band Dream Theater, which he has been fronting since 1991.

== Early life ==
Kevin James LaBrie was born in Penetanguishene, Ontario, Canada as the youngest of four kids. He started both singing and playing the drums at age five. In elementary school, he had a music teacher that took to him really well and nurtured him and got him into singing contests. In addition to music, LaBrie also grew up an enthusiastic hockey fan, playing whenever possible and watching Hockey Night in Canada every Saturday night with his family. Because there wasn't a lot to do around his hometown growing up, he spent a lot of time getting together with friends sitting around listening to music. By his mid-teens, he was a member of several bands as a front man that attempted singing and/or drumming. He stopped playing drums at age 17, thinking there were too many great drummers better than him, and decided to home in on singing as his pursuit. He moved to Toronto, Ontario in 1981 at age 18.

== Career ==
=== Coney Hatch ===
LaBrie joined Coney Hatch in 1986 when they were attempting a new line-up. The band recorded a number of demonstration tapes in their rehearsal studio and performed live in Ontario clubs for several months. When their record company (Anthem) expressed their disapproval of the line-up, the band replaced LaBrie with Phil Naro in one last ditched attempt at forging ahead without Carl Dixon. That line-up was to be short lived as well.

=== Winter Rose ===
Soon after parting ways with Coney Hatch, LaBrie became the vocalist for the glam metal band Winter Rose. The group also included Richard Chycki on guitar and bass, Randy Cooke on drums, and (in an earlier incarnation) Sebastian Bach on vocals, who later went on to Skid Row. Chycki had also worked with Bach under the band names 'Hope', and later 'Sebastian', before settling on 'Winter Rose'. The band recorded a series of demos through 1988 and 1989 with supporting musicians Bruce Dies and Rob Laidlaw. Most tracks weren't commercially released until 1997 when a self-titled album was released by Inside Out Music, a full 7 years after the group had disbanded. Their track "I'll Never Fall In Love Again" was released with a promo video in 1989 and would later be included on the album. All songs on the album were written by Richard Chycki and James LaBrie, save two which were written in whole by Richard Chycki.

=== Dream Theater ===
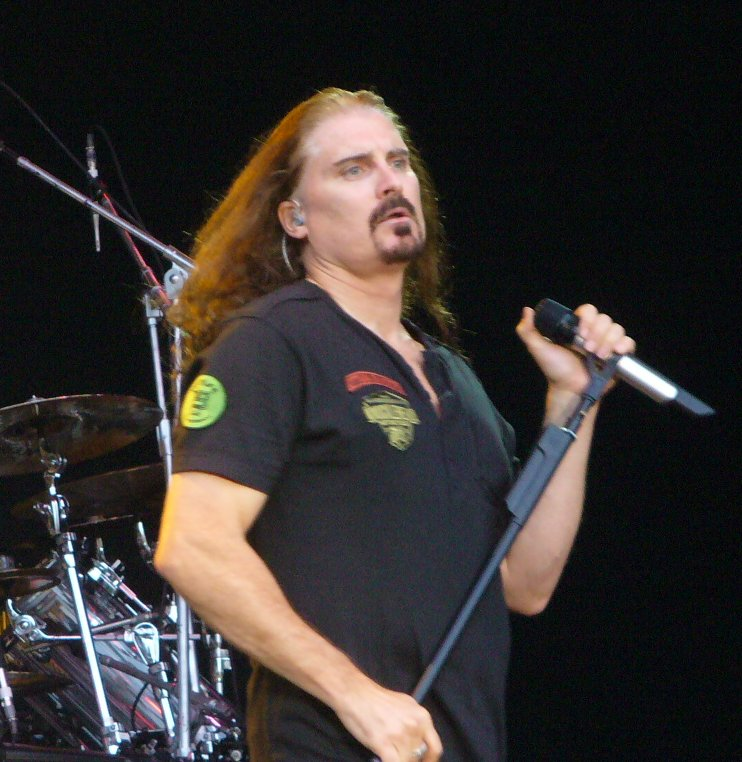
LaBrie performing in 2007

In 1990, LaBrie learned that American progressive metal band Dream Theater was looking for a new singer, so he submitted a tape featuring a Winter Rose live recording. Just days before committing to another singer, Dream Theater received the tape and were so taken by LaBrie's voice and look that he was immediately flown to Long Island, New York for an audition. The tryout went well, and he was chosen ahead of 200 other hopefuls to fill the band's full-time vocalist position. LaBrie also joined the band on the condition that he stay living in Canada where he is close to family and friends. LaBrie dropped his first name upon joining Dream Theater to avoid any mix-ups with Kevin Moore, as two Johns in the band (John Petrucci and John Myung) was already confusing enough.

LaBrie has since had a significant impact on the vocal melodies on each Dream Theater album, but had little input on the instrumentation of Dream Theater's music until 2011's A Dramatic Turn of Events which features LaBrie in the music credits on three songs. To date he has written or co-written lyrics for at least one song on eleven of the sixteen albums Dream Theater has released with him in the band, Images and Words, Black Clouds & Silver Linings, Dream Theater and The Astonishing containing none of them.

Asked by Prog-Sphere.com what is his favourite Dream Theater song to play live, James says "The favorite song for me is Scarred, I love performing that live. And... well, Octavarium, that whole freakin' thing."

LaBrie had a strained relationship with Dream Theater drummer Mike Portnoy for many years after Portnoy's departure from the band in 2010, as they are both emotional and passionate people which led to public back-and-forth comments in the press over the years. One such example is when LaBrie commented Dream Theater was more balanced since Portnoy's departure without "somebody in the background trying to grab the limelight" during an interview with Prog-Sphere.com, while Portnoy at one point had commented Liquid Tension Experiment "was like Dream Theater without annoying vocals" during an interview on Brazil's Rádio Kiss FM 92,5. In 2020, LaBrie revealed he had not spoken to Portnoy in 10 years, and highly doubted a reunion. On March 4, 2022, two hours before going onstage to perform with Dream Theater at the Beacon Theatre in New York City, LaBrie received a text message from his manager indicating Portnoy would be at the show and wanted to visit LaBrie backstage to make amends. Hesitant at first, LaBrie went incognito and walked the streets of New York City to think it over, as well as called his wife who encouraged him to do it. LaBrie agreed, and as soon as he came out of his dressing room and saw Portnoy, gave him a hug and their contempt for one another melted away within seconds. LaBrie and Portnoy's emotional reunion would pave the way for Portnoy to rejoin Dream Theater in 2023. Portnoy has stated he went from being LaBrie's biggest critic to being his biggest cheerleader.

=== Solo ===
With Matt Guillory, LaBrie has released five solo albums under various names (Mullmuzzler, James LaBrie's Mullmuzzler, and simply James LaBrie).

In an interview from Beyond The Dark Horizon on June 12, 2010, James LaBrie stated that his next solo album, entitled Static Impulse, is in the mixing stages and will contain 12 tracks. James stated "It's very heavy and I'm really excited." On July 27, 2010, it was announced on Dream Theater's website that Static Impulse would be released on September 27, 2010, through Inside Out Music. It features longtime collaborator Matt Guillory on keyboards, Marco Sfogli (who also played on LaBrie's earlier album Elements of Persuasion) on guitars, Peter Wildoer of the Swedish melodic death metal band Darkane on drums and screaming vocals, and Ray Riendeau on bass.

In July 2013, LaBrie's album Impermanent Resonance was released by Inside Out Music.

In November 2020, LaBrie announced his next album would be acoustically driven and would feature Paul Logue of Eden's Curse as his main collaborator, as well as LaBrie's son Chance on drums. The album, titled Beautiful Shade of Grey, was announced on March 18, 2022, with the release of the first single "Devil In Drag". The album was released on May 20, 2022, by Inside Out Music. LaBrie recorded Beautiful Shade of Grey in his home studio, which he had built alongside Chance in April 2020 as a way to keep busy during the COVID-19 pandemic.

=== Other projects and appearances ===
Throughout his career with Dream Theater, LaBrie has lent his voice to many other artists' records as well as tribute albums. In 1991, not long after joining Dream Theater (and before ever appearing on a Dream Theater recording), he sang background vocals on the song "Life in Still Water" on Fates Warning's Parallels album. He has appeared on many Trent Gardner releases (including Leonardo: The Absolute Man and Explorer's Club), as well as appearing on albums by such artists as Shadow Gallery, Tim Donahue and Frameshift.

LaBrie sang the national anthem prior to the Memphis RiverKings-Fort Worth Brahmas hockey game on October 18, 2003, at the DeSoto Civic Center in Southaven, Mississippi.

LaBrie provided the lead vocals for the main character in the rock opera album The Human Equation by Ayreon; in 2015, he reprised his role for a live version, The Theater Equation. He was also featured as the character "The Historian" in the album The Source.

LaBrie is also a featured vocalist on Henning Pauly's "Babysteps" project released in 2006; LaBrie plays the role of the arrogant doctor.

Since 2004, LaBrie has been working with the True Symphonic Rockestra project, along with Thomas Dewald, Vladimir Grishko, Dirk Ulrich, Christoph Wansleben, Sandro Martinez, Paul Mayland, Marvin Philippi, and Igor Marin. Their album, Concerto in True Minor - 3 Rock Tenors was released on iTunes and for download on Amazon on March 28, 2008, by Brainworx and Marinsound.

In 2011, LaBrie collaborated with the heavy metal band Eden's Curse, providing vocals for the song "No Holy Man" which was released on the Eden's Curse third studio album Trinity.

In 2016, LaBrie was the special guest on the Last Union debut album firstly meant to be named "Most Beautiful Day". He sang in three songs: "President Evil", "Taken" and "A Place In Heaven". Eventually, the album was called "Twelve"; it was released on December 21, 2018. "Twelve" was written and pieced together over a 2 1/2-year period.

In 2021, James LaBrie collaborated with his son Chance LaBrie's band Falset, providing vocals for a cover of "Kickstart my Heart" by Mötley Crüe, released June 10, 2021.

== Personal life ==
In an interview with Elizabeth Zharoff, LaBrie said he met his wife Karen in high school. As of 2022, they have been married for 33 years. Together they have two children, one of which is drummer Chance LaBrie, with whom James has collaborated on various musical projects.

LaBrie had said in many older interviews that he was Christian, and actively practiced the religion. However, in 2005, LaBrie said that he now considers himself "a more spiritual-directed person".

LaBrie does not drink or smoke while on the road and keeps a healthy diet and exercise regimen, which he has credited with keeping his stamina for the band's shows.

LaBrie is a long-time hockey fan, having played hockey growing up and regularly watching hockey games on TV. His love for hockey was molded by NHL greats like Dave Keon, Keny Dryden, Börje Salming, and Darryl Sittler.

Three days before his daughter's seventh birthday, she had a seizure and went into a coma for three and a half hours, which inspired LaBrie to write the lyrics to the song "Vacant".

== Singing ==
=== Development and education ===
Early in his career, LaBrie had been on the road playing in bar bands, performing in sleazy bars and rooms, smoke-filled rooms, sleeping in bug-infested beds, performing three sets a night, six nights in a row. He found this very taxing on his voice and began training with renowned vocal coach Rosemary Burns at 22 years old. LaBrie studied with her once a week for three months, learning invaluable techniques that he continued practicing at home after their training had finished. Years later just before the Train of Thought tour with Dream Theater in 2004, LaBrie studied with another voice teacher named Victoria Thompson, who taught him a lot about warming up and cooling down, as well as keeping the voice in shape and making it a more variable and stronger instrument. In 2009 he studied with vocal coach Jaime Vendera, who showed LaBrie techniques to help keep his voice in shape while touring the world, and they would continue studying together off and on for several years. In an interview with The Prog Report, LaBrie discussed how he had been seeing voice pathologist Dr. Aaron Low at The Voice Clinic in Toronto, Ontario in 2024 while recording Parasomnia, which LaBrie called an epiphany and has left him singing like he did 30 years ago.

=== Influences ===
His musical influences comes from many different genres, including such artists as Sebastian Bach, Rush, Aerosmith, Don Dokken, Metallica, The Doors, Ludwig van Beethoven, Nat King Cole, Queen, Sting, and Muse whose inspiration, according to LaBrie, is shown on Dream Theater's album, Octavarium. LaBrie lists Freddie Mercury as his "all-time favorite" singer, and also admires such singers as Steve Perry, Lou Gramm, Rob Halford, Steven Tyler, Robert Plant, and Jeff Buckley, among others. LaBrie revealed some of his more obscure influences to MusicRadar which include Duran Duran, George Michael, Luther Vandross, Michael Bublé, and Gino Vannelli. Regarding his influences, LaBrie has stated: "Even if it's just a spirit or a mood, what you listen to comes out in what you do ... It all seeps into your musical identify, and I think that's pretty cool."

=== Reception ===
He was voted by fans to No. 16 on MusicRadar's "The greatest vocalists of all time" in 2010.

=== Food poisoning incident ===
On December 30, 1994, while vacationing in Cuba, LaBrie was stricken with a severe case of food poisoning from contaminated pork and while vomiting, he ruptured his vocal cords. He saw three throat specialists who all said there was nothing they could do except have him rest his voice as much as possible. However, on January 12, 1995, against doctor's orders, he was on the Waking Up the World Tour in Japan promoting Dream Theater's Awake album with his voice far from normal. LaBrie has said he did not feel vocally "normal" until at least 2002. He has also said that this era was a very hard time for him as a singer, and depression as a result caused him to consider departing from the band, although his bandmates supported him and urged him to stay. After the World Tourbulence tour, he discovered that his voice had fully returned. He said that his voice was fully healed by time and training. However, while speaking to Greg Prato of Songfacts in 2019, LaBrie explained how the incident affected his vocal range. "So, instead of hitting D's and E's and F-sharps and all that stuff, I was able to hit C, C-sharp, and D. But I had to really watch it. I have hit F notes here and there, but I have to really watch it. But that was probably the darkest moment in my life, for sure."

=== Lip syncing allegations ===
In February 2022, rumours emerged of LaBrie lip syncing during the North American leg of Dream Theater's Top of the World Tour as fan recordings from the tour were posted online. Specifically, fans pointed to the post-chorus section of the song "Bridges In The Sky" as evidence of LaBrie lip syncing to a pre-recorded vocal track. LaBrie addressed the controversy onstage during the band's performance in Houston, Texas, on March 18, 2022, denying the allegations and claiming he has never lip synced in his entire life. In October 2023, LaBrie reiterated that he has never lip synced and elaborated on his stance: "I don't agree with anybody lip-syncing to their music. I say that if you do it, you should be able to reproduce it live, or at least try to reproduce it live". He also said he's not against the usage of backing tracks during live performances "if it's done intelligently, creatively and artistically."

== Discography ==
Winter Rose

- Winter Rose (1989)

Dream Theater

- Images and Words (1992)
- Awake (1994)
- A Change of Seasons (1995)
- Falling into Infinity (1997)
- Metropolis Pt. 2: Scenes from a Memory (1999)
- Six Degrees of Inner Turbulence (2002)
- Train of Thought (2003)
- Octavarium (2005)
- Systematic Chaos (2007)
- Black Clouds & Silver Linings (2009)
- A Dramatic Turn of Events (2011)
- Dream Theater (2013)
- The Astonishing (2016)
- Distance over Time (2019)
- A View from the Top of the World (2021)
- Parasomnia (2025)

MullMuzzler

- Keep It to Yourself (1999)
- MullMuzzler 2 (2001)

Solo

- Elements of Persuasion (2005)
- Static Impulse (2010)
- Impermanent Resonance (2013)
- I Will Not Break (2014) (Compilation EP)
- Beautiful Shade of Grey (2022)

Others

- Fates Warning – Parallels (1991)
- Explorers Club – Age of Impact (1998)
- Various Artists (A tribute to Rush) – Working Man – A Tribute to Rush (1996)
- Various Artists (A tribute to Queen) – Dragon Attack (1997)
- Shadow Gallery – Tyranny (1998)
- Various Artists (A tribute to Emerson, Lake & Palmer) – Encores, Legends & Paradox (1999)
- Various Artists – Rock Super Stars Vol.3 – Hard Rock / Heavy Metal Mega Hits In 80's (2000)
- Various Artists – Leonardo – The Absolute Man (2001)
- Explorers Club – Raising the Mammoth (2002)
- Frameshift – Unweaving the Rainbow (2003)
- Tim Donahue – Madmen & Sinners (2004)
- Ayreon – The Human Equation (2004)
- Henning Pauly – Babysteps (2006)
- John Macaluso & Union Radio – The Radio Waves Goodbye (2007)
- True Symphonic Rockestra – Concerto in True Minor (2008)
- Redemption – Snowfall on Judgment Day (2009)
- Roswell Six – Terra Incognita: Beyond the Horizon (2009)
- Eden's Curse – Trinity (2011)
- Rik Emmett & RESolution9 – RES9 (2016)
- Ayreon – The Source (2017)
- Last Union – Twelve (2018)
- Jordan Rudess – Wired for Madness (2019)
- Symphony North – The Bell Ringer (2019)
- Evergrey – Escape of the Phoenix (2021)
- Timo Tolkki's Avalon – The Enigma Birth (2021)
- Khalil Turk & Friends – Turkish Delight II (2023)
- Various Artists – Meddle Reimagined – A Tribute to Pink Floyd (2023)
