= Peter Wildoer =

Swedish drummer

- Origin: Glumslöv, Sweden
- Genres: Heavy metal; progressive metal; melodic death metal
- Occupation: Drummer
- Formerly of: Agretator, Arch Enemy, Armageddon, Darkane, Electrocution 250, Grimmark, In Flames, James LaBrie, Majestic, Non-Human Level, Old Man's Child, Pestilence, Rusty Flores, Silver Seraph, Soilwork, The Stefan Rosqvist Band, Time Requiem
- Website: peterwildoer.com

Karl Peter Wildoer is a Swedish musician who is the drummer for Darkane, Electrocution 250 and Grimmark. He has also drummed for the bands Armageddon, Majestic, Pestilence, Silver Seraph, Arch Enemy, Time Requiem, Soilwork, Gardens of Obscurity and Dawn of Oblivion amongst others. He performed drums on Old Man's Child's 2009 album, Slaves of the World, and is the drummer/harsh vocalist of the James LaBrie solo records Static Impulse (2010) and Impermanent Resonance (2013). He also joined the experimental metal trio Electrocution 250 along with Todd Duane and Lalle Larsson, with which released the album Cartoon Music from Hell.

He received his first drumset when he was 7. When he was nine he started to play the flute at the local music school (Kommunala musikskolan) where he learned how to read sheet music. After a year of playing the flute he quit and decided to take drum lessons instead. In 1986 he joined a brass band. He stayed with this band for 8 years. At the age of 14 he created his first rock band named "Dammer", which was later changed to "Zaninez". In 1989 Christopher Malmström joined the band Zaninez and he and Peter became friends. This friendship would later help to form Darkane.

He also auditioned for Dream Theater in 2010. He competed along with 6 others, who the band called "the world's greatest drummers". The band was openly impressed with his audition, going as far as to name him in their Top 3 favorites, along with Mike Mangini (who was hired as the band's new drummer), Virgil Donati, Aquiles Priester, Derek Roddy, Thomas Lang and Marco Minnemann.

== Credits ==
Drum technician

- Colony (1999) – In Flames

Record producer

- Sworn to a Great Divide (2007) – Soilwork

=== Albums ===
==== Agretator ====
- Delusions (1993)
- Kompakt Kraft (1994)
- Distorted Logic (1996)

==== Armageddon ====
- Crossing The Rubicon (1997)

==== Arch Enemy ====
- Stigmata (1998)

==== Darkane ====
- Rusted Angel (1999)
- Insanity (2001)
- Expanding Senses (2002)
- Layers of Lies (2005)
- Demonic Art (2008)
- The Sinister Supremacy (2013)
- Inhuman Spirits (2022)

==== Majestic ====
- Trinity Overture (2000)

==== Silver Seraph ====
- Silver Seraph (2001)

==== Time Requiem ====
- Time Requiem (2002)
- Unleased In Japan (2004)

==== Electrocution 250 ====
- Electric Cartoon Music From Hell (2004)

==== Non-Human Level ====
(On vocals)

- Non-Human Level (2005)

==== Rusty Flores ====
- Rusty Flores (2006)
- New Leaf vs. Violent White (2007)

==== Grimmark ====
- Grimmark (2007)

==== The Stefan Rosqvist Band ====
- Guitar Diaries (2008)

==== Pestilence ====
- Resurrection Macabre (2009)

==== Old Man's Child ====
- Slaves of the World (2009)

==== James LaBrie ====
(Drums, vocals)

- Static Impulse (2010)
- Impermanent Resonance (2013)
