= Layers of Lies =

Studio album by Darkane
- Released: 27 June 2005
- Recorded: October 2004 – March 2005 (Not Quite Studio, Helsingborg)
- Genres: Melodic death metal, thrash metal
- Length: 42:50
- Label: Nuclear Blast

Darkane chronology
Expanding Senses (2002)	Layers of Lies (2005)	Demonic Art (2008)

Professional ratings
Review scores
Source	Rating
AllMusic	3.5/5 stars
Scream Magazine	4/6 stars

Layers of Lies is the fourth album from Swedish melodic death metal band Darkane, issued on 27 June 2005.

The release of this album took sometime since the last album because Peter Wildoer suffered a severe hand injury in 2003 which left him uncertain whether he would drum again but miraculously a year later recovered. Along with that Wildoer became busy with Christofer Malmström new project at the time, Non-Human Level.

This was the last album to feature vocalist Andreas Sydow who left in 2007.

== Track listing ==
No.	Title	Lyrics	Music	Length
1.	"Amnesia of the Wildoerian Apocalypse"	instrumental	Malmström, Wildoer	1:42
2.	"Secondary Effects"	Malmström	Malmström, Wildoer	3:55
3.	"Organic Canvas"	Wildoer	Malmström, Wildoer	4:30
4.	"Fading Dimensions"	Wildoer	Ideberg, Wildoer	4:19
5.	"Layers of Lies"	Wildoer	Malmström, Wildoer	4:17
6.	"Godforsaken Universe"	Wildoer	Ideberg	4:05
7.	"Klastrophobic Hibernation"	instrumental	Ideberg	0:36
8.	"Vision of Degradation"	Ideberg	Ideberg, Wildoer	4:37
9.	"Contaminated"	Löfberg	Ideberg, Wildoer	3:38
10.	"Maelstrom Crisis"	instrumental	Malmström	2:40
11.	"Decadent Messiah"	Sydow	Malmström, Wildoer	3:54
12.	"The Creation Insane"	Malmström	Malmström, Wildoer	4:37
13.	"Subliminal Seduction" (Bonus Track)	Malmström	Malmström, Wildoer	4:00

== Credits ==
=== Darkane ===
- Andreas Sydow - vocals
- Christofer Malmström - lead guitar, tenor
- Klas Ideberg - rhythm guitar
- Jörgen Löfberg - bass guitar
- Peter Wildoer - drums, percussion

=== The Orchestra ===
- Tomas Ebrelius - violins/viola
- Charlotta Weber Sjöhol - cello
- Markus Närvik - double bass
- Joakim Wåhlstedt - french horn
- Anders Jonsson - tuba

=== Choir Personnel ===
- Christian Odeholm - engineer
- Per Nyrén - conductor

==== Soprano Choir ====
- Catarina Crivelius Horvat
- Birgit Böckmann
- Carin Borgström
- Susanne Bengtsson
- Mette Bryngemark
- Christina Nyrén
- Therese Malmström

==== Alto Choir ====
- Eva Forsell
- Gerturd Hanson
- Gull-Britt Linell Persson
- Christina Engman
- Susanne Kjellsson
- Erika Nordahl
- Isabelle Malmström

==== Bass Choir ====
- Per Hallberg
- Åke Pesson
- Pehr Bengtson
- Sven Nordahl
- Jan Forsell
- Ulf Nilsson
- Niclas Fröhberg

==== Tenor Choir ====
- Martin Fröhberg
- Hans Malmsteen
- Johan Sandberg
- Christer Lundin
- Krister Hedlund
- Agenta Falkengren
