= Demonic Art =

Studio album by Darkane
- Released: 24 October 2008
- Recorded: February–April 2008; Not Quite Studio & Sensus Musikhuset, Helsingborg
- Genre: Melodic death metal, thrash metal
- Length: 46:05
- Label: Nuclear Blast; Massacre Records
- Producer: Darkane

Darkane chronology
Layers of Lies (2005)	Demonic Art (2008)	Layers of Live (2010)

Professional ratings
Review scores
Source	Rating
AllMusic	link
Sputnikmusic	link
Terrorizer	(Dec 2008)

Demonic Art is the fifth album by metal band Darkane. It is the only album to feature vocalist Jens Broman. The concept of the album is based on the song "Organic Canvas" from Layers of Lies.

== Track listing ==
No.	Title	Lyrics	Music	Length
1.	"Variations of an Eye Crush"	instrumental	Malmström	1:31
2.	"Leaving Existence"	Wildoer	Malmström, Wildoer	3:59
3.	"Demonic Art"	Wildoer	Ideberg, Malmström	4:45
4.	"Absolution"	Broman	Ideberg	4:00
5.	"Execution 44"	Malmström	Malmström	4:56
6.	"Impetuous Constant Chaos"	Wildoer	Ideberg	3:48
7.	"Demigod"	Broman	Malmström	4:15
8.	"Sole Survivor"	Malmström	Malmström	4:08
9.	"The Killing of I"	Wildoer	Wildoer	4:49
10.	"Wrong Grave"	instrumental	Malmström	0:53
11.	"Still in Progress"	Malmström	Malmström	3:22

Bonus tracks
No.	Title	Writer(s)	Length
12.	"Wrath Connection"	Malmström	5:35
13.	"Reborn in Greed" (American bonus track)	Ideberg (music), Wildoer (lyrics)	3:58
14.	"Innocence Gone (live)" (Japanese bonus track)	Ideberg	4:57

== Credits ==
Darkane

- Christofer Malmström - lead guitar
- Peter Wildoer - drums
- Jörgen Löfberg - bass
- Klas Ideberg - rhythm guitar
- Jens Broman - vocals
