= Impermanent Resonance =

2013 studio album by James LaBrie

Studio album by James LaBrie
- Released: July 29, 2013 (Europe); August 6, 2013 (North America)
- Genres: Alternative metal, progressive metal, melodic death metal
- Length: 49:46 (standard edition); 57:03 (limited edition)
- Label: Inside Out Music
- Producers: James LaBrie, Matt Guillory (vocals), Peter Wildoer; co-produced by Peter Wichers

James LaBrie chronology
Static Impulse (2010)	Impermanent Resonance (2013)	Beautiful Shade of Grey (2022)

Impermanent Resonance is the third solo album and fifth solo project by Canadian singer James LaBrie. It was released on July 29, 2013, in Europe and on August 6, 2013, in North America.

The album again features melodic death metal elements first heard on Static Impulse, and once again features screaming vocals by drummer Peter Wildoer.

Impermanent Resonance was released to generally positive reviews and reception from critics and fans.

== Release ==
The cover art and release date were revealed on June 4, 2013. The first single, "Agony", was released on June 19, 2013. The European digipak edition features an alternative artwork. Two limited 180 gr. vinyl editions were also released: a black version and a white version. Both versions include a bonus CD with the full album and the bonus tracks featured on the European digipak edition.

== Track list ==
No.	Title	Writer(s)	Length
1.	"Agony"	Peter Wichers, Matt Guillory, James LaBrie	4:23
2.	"Undertow"	Guillory	4:02
3.	"Slight of Hand"	Wichers, Guillory, LaBrie	5:21
4.	"Back on the Ground"	Guillory	4:06
5.	"I Got You"	Guillory	3:46
6.	"Holding On"	Guillory	4:53
7.	"Lost in the Fire"	Wichers, Niclas Lundin, Guillory	3:52
8.	"Letting Go"	Wichers, Guillory, LaBrie	4:17
9.	"Destined to Burn"	Wichers, Guillory, LaBrie	4:00
10.	"Say You're Still Mine"	Viktor Brunö, Tobias Gustavsson, Lundin, Michel Zitron	3:32
11.	"Amnesia"	Guillory	3:43
12.	"I Will Not Break"	Wichers, Guillory, LaBrie	3:52

European limited digipak edition
No.	Title	Writer(s)	Length
13.	"Unraveling"	Lundin, Guillory	3:30
14.	"Why"	Guillory	3:47

== Reception ==
Professional ratings
Review scores
Source	Rating
About.com	
CDstarts	4.5/5 stars
PROG Magazine	8.5/10 stars

The album generally received very positive reviews and reception. Daniel Køtz of the German webzine CDstarts.de wrote that James LaBrie and his band have found their very own sound at last which is emancipated from Dream Theater. He writes that the album is not a simple alternative to Dream Theater but an original work.

== I Will Not Break EP ==
I Will Not Break

EP by James LaBrie
- Released: January 6, 2014 (Europe); January 14, 2014 (North America)
- Genres: Progressive metal, melodic death metal, electronica
- Length: 38:08
- Label: Inside Out Music

I Will Not Break is a digital EP by James LaBrie. It was released on January 6, 2014, in Europe and on January 14, 2014, in North America. The EP consists of nine songs. Track 1 is from Impermanent Resonance and track 2 and track 3 are from the European digipak edition of that album. Track 4 is an alternate mix of "Coming Home" from Static Impulse and track 5 and track 6 are demos of two songs from that album. Track 7, 8 and 9 are electronica remixes of songs from Static Impulse. Track 7 was previously available in Japan and the last two tracks have never been released before.

Track listing
No.	Title	Length
1.	"I Will Not Break"	3:52
2.	"Unraveling"	3:31
3.	"Why"	3:45
4.	"Coming Home (Alternate Mix)"	4:23
5.	"Jekyll or Hyde" (demo)	3:48
6.	"Just Watch Me" (demo)	4:18
7.	"I Tried (Jason Miller Remix)"	5:17
8.	"Over the Edge (Mutrix Remix)" (previously unreleased)	4:33
9.	"Euphoric (NeonGenesis Remix)" (previously unreleased)	4:41
Total length:		38:08

== Personnel ==
=== Band ===
- James LaBrie – lead clean vocals (except on demos)
- Marco Sfogli – guitar
- Matt Guillory – keyboards, background vocals, lead vocals on demos, editing
- Ray Riendeau – bass, bass recording
- Peter Wildoer – drums, screamed vocals

=== Production ===
- Jens Bogren – mixing
- Tony Lindgren – mastering
- Peter Wichers – guitar recording, editing, composing
- Johan Örnborg – drum recording
- Shane McCurdy – vocal recording

=== Photography ===
- Danny Morrison – James
- Aaron Aslanian – Ray
- Pina Benevento – Marco
- Bihter Guillory – Matt
- Andreas Ejnarsson – Wildoer
- Leticia Dumas – cover art, photos
- Gustavo Sazes – artwork photos, artwork and sleeve design
