= Static Impulse =

Studio album by James LaBrie
- Released: September 28, 2010
- Recorded: 2010
- Studio: Studiomega (Varberg)
- Genre: Progressive metal, melodic death metal
- Length: 50:44
- Label: Inside Out, Century Media
- Producer: Matt Guillory, James LaBrie

James LaBrie chronology
Elements of Persuasion (2005)	Static Impulse (2010)	Impermanent Resonance (2013)

Professional ratings
Review scores
Source	Rating
About.com	4/5 stars
Danger Dog	3.5/5 stars
Metal Express Radio	6.5/10
The Music Cycle	4/5 stars

Static Impulse is the second solo album and fourth solo project by Dream Theater lead singer James LaBrie, released on September 28, 2010. In late August 2010, LaBrie released two songs from the album titled "One More Time" and "I Need You".

This album features a more melodic death metal approach while still keeping the progressive elements from the previous albums. Aside from LaBrie's usual clean vocals, the album also features harsh vocals by drummer Peter Wildoer and backing vocals by keyboardist Matt Guillory, who also sang lead on the album's demos.

== Track listing ==
=== Standard edition ===
All lyrics are written by Guillory and LaBrie, except where noted.

No.	Title	Length
1.	"One More Time"	4:16
2.	"Jekyll or Hyde"	3:46
3.	"Mislead"	4:18
4.	"Euphoric"	5:09
5.	"Over the Edge" (Guillory, Sfogli, LaBrie)	4:20
6.	"I Need You"	4:11
7.	"Who You Think I Am"	3:57
8.	"I Tried"	3:58
9.	"Just Watch Me"	4:18
10.	"This Is War"	4:30
11.	"Superstar"	3:32
12.	"Coming Home"	4:24

=== Limited edition digipak bonus tracks ===
No.	Title	Length
13.	"Jekyll or Hyde (Demo)"	3:48
14.	"Coming Home (Alternative Mix)"	4:23

== Personnel ==
- James LaBrie – lead clean vocals
- Marco Sfogli – lead and rhythm guitars, programming, additional bass, mixing
- Matt Guillory – keyboards, programming, backing vocals, additional screams, lead vocals on "Jekyll or Hyde (Demo)"
- Ray Riendeau – bass
- Peter Wildoer – drums, screaming vocals

=== Production ===
- Arranged and produced by James LaBrie & Matt Guillory
- Engineered by Matt Guillory, Johan "The Ant" Ornborg, Ray Riendeau and Marco Sfogli
- Pre-production by Matt Guillory and Marco Sfogli
- Vocal editing by Alex Durand
- Mixed by Jens Bogren and Marco Sfogli
- Mastered by Jens Bogren
