= Marco Sfogli =

Italian guitarist (born 1980)

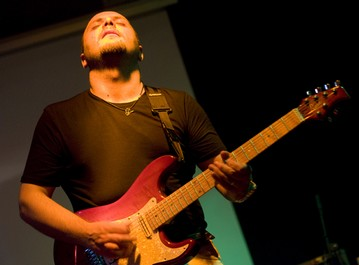
- Sfogli performing in 2008

Background information
- Born: 4 April 1980 (age 46)
- Origin: Naples, Italy
- Genres: Progressive metal; hard rock; heavy metal; progressive rock
- Occupation: Guitarist
- Website: marcosfogli.com jtcguitar.com/store/artist/marco-sfogli

Marco Sfogli (born April 4, 1980) is an Italian heavy metal and rock guitarist. He has played guitar with James LaBrie, PFM and Icefish.

== Biography ==
Born in 1980, Sfogli's first attempt with music came in 1984 when he played with his parents (both musicians) in Schwetzingen, Germany during an encore. In 1989, he received his first Washburn electric guitar as a gift. He started to play along with his heroes (Michael Jackson, Van Halen, Europe). In 1992, he left the guitar to study the drums: "Being a drummer first and a guitarist second, helped me a lot in terms of creativity and rhythmic knowledge." In 1996, he left the drums because of his growing interest in guitar, especially after an intense listening of Images and Words by Dream Theater.

In 2005, Sfogli flew to Canada to record James LaBrie's third solo progressive metal release titled Elements of Persuasion. Sfogli released his first solo record titled There's Hope in February 2008 through Lion Music. In 2010, he also worked on the fourth James LaBrie record Static Impulse as guitar player, co-writer and engineer. He released his second solo album in 2012, titled reMarcoble and edited by JTC Records. In 2013, he rejoined the James LaBrie band for the third time for the recording of the album Impermanent Resonance. In March 2015, he was announced as new guitar player for the Italian progressive band PFM, replacing former member Franco Mussida. In 2015, he played in the band Icefish with Virgil Donati on drums, Alex Argento on keyboards, and Andrea Casali on bass and vocals. Icefish released their debut album Human Hardware in 2017.

== Discography ==
As a player

- NCCP (Nuova Compagnia Di Canto Popolare) – La voce del grano (2001)
- Marco Fasano – e già...! (2003)
- NCCP (Nuova Compagnia Di Canto Popolare) – Candelora (2005)
- James LaBrie – Elements of Persuasion (2005)
- Magni Animi Viri – Heroes Temporis (2006)
- Jordan Rudess – The Road Home (2007) (Guitar on "Dance On A Volcano")
- The Alchemist II – The Alchemist II (2007)
- Alex Argento – EGO (2007)
- John Macaluso & Union Radio – Radio Waves Goodbye (2007)
- Shadrane – Temporal (2009)
- Adam Nitti – Liminal (2009) (Guitar on "The Reinassance Man/Rebirth" and "Distraction")
- Project Damage Control – Mechanism (2010)
- Utopia – Ice and Knives (2010)
- Creation's End – A New Beginning (2010)
- James LaBrie – Static Impulse (2010)
- Soul Secret – Closer To Daylight (2011) (Guitar solo on "River's Edge")
- Dino Fiorenza – It's Important (2011) (Guitars on Mr. Vester)
- Guitar Addiction – A Tribute to Modern Guitar (2011)
- Various Artists – Jason Becker's Not Dead Yet! (Live in Haarlem) (2012)
- Virgil Donati – In This Life (2012)
- Neural FX – Abreaction (2012) (Second guitar solo on "Matter of Time")
- Ray Riendeau – Transcend (Song) (2012)
- James LaBrie – Impermanent Resonance (2013)
- LALU – Atomic Ark (2013)
- Nathan Frost – synecron (2013)
- Creation's End – Metaphysical (2014)
- Alberto Rigoni – Overloaded (2014)
- Widek – Hidden Dimensions (2017) (Guitar on "Deep & Shallow")
- Icefish – Human Hardware (2017)
- Premiata Forneria Marconi – Emotional Tattoos (2017)
- Ostura – The Room (2018)
- Richard Henshall – The Cocoon (2019)
- Virgil Donati – Ruination (2019)
- Intervals – Circadian (2020)
- Cody Carpenter – Memories And Dreams (2020)
- James LaBrie – Beautiful Shade of Grey (2022)

Solo albums

- Marco Sfogli – There's Hope (2008)
- Marco Sfogli – reMarcoble (2012)
- Marco Sfogli – Homeland (2019)
- Marco Sfogli – Welcome to Ooglyworld (2023)

== Equipment ==
Sfogli played on Rash Guitars, a small Italian company, then switched to Ibanez Guitars and has played them for 10 years exclusively. He's been seen using a prototype of what would become his signature model, based on a Premium line RG shape, this guitar was out in 2016 named the Ibanez Premium RG MSM1. In 2019, a new Japanese model based on the popular AZ series has been revealed, named the MSM100. He used Mesa Boogie Amps for various recordings, then switched to Dv Mark amplification using their Triple 6, then their Multiamp digital processor. During 2016 he played Victory amps for the first P.F.M. tours then switched to Mezzabarba amps as his main amp in 2018, he uses both the MZero Overdrive and the Skill; in 2019 he switched to a rack config using the new Mezzabarba Nivrana Preamp alongside a VHT 2:50:2 poweramp and a Fractal FX8 for his effects. In the studio he's been using both the Fractal Audio products and Kemper Profiling amplifier. In July 2020 he announced the switch to Charvel/Jackson Guitars

Guitars:

- Rash Custom Guitars "Marco Sfogli models"
- Ibanez RG Premium RG920QM
- Ibanez RG Prestige RG752
- Ibanez RGDIX7MPB-SBB Iron Label
- Ibanez RG2750QV-TAB Prestige
- Ibanez RG28020ZD LTD
- Ibanez Prestige RG2027XL-DTB
- Ibanez Prestige RG-MS1 Custom
- Ibanez RG MSM L.A.C.S Custom build (Signature Prototype)
- Ibanez Prestige AZ2402 TFF
- Ibanez RG MSM1 (Marco Sfogli Signature Model) (Premium Line)
- Ibanez AZ MSM100 (Marco Sfogli Signature Model) (Prestige Line)
- Charvel Pro-Mod So-Cal Style 1 HSS FR M Satin Burgundy Mist (with EMG 85/SLV/SLV Pickups Set)
- Charvel Pro-Mod So-Cal Style 1 HSS FR M Satin Shell Pink (with EMG 85/SA/SA Pickups Set)
- Charvel Henrik Danhage Limited Edition Signature Pro-Mod So-Cal Style 1 (with EMG Crossroads/Super 77 Pickups Set)
- Jackson Pro Series Dinky DK Modern Ash FR7 Baked Green (with EMG 81/60 Pickups Set)
- Charvel Pro-Mod DK24 HSH 2PT CM Mystic Blue
- Charvel Custom Shop So-Cal Style 1 HSS FR
- Charvel Marco Sfogli Signature Pro-Mod So-Cal Style 1 HSS FR CM QM-Transparent Purple Burst

Amps:

- Mesa Boogie Mark V
- Mesa Boogie Triple Rectifier
- Mesa Boogie Dual Rectifier
- Mesa Boogie Lonestar
- Mesa Boogie Rectifier Rack Preamp
- Mesa Boogie Triaxis Preamp
- Mesa Boogie Stereo 2:90 Poweramp
- ENGL Fireball
- DV Mark Triple 6
- Victory V30 the Countess
- Victory KX the Kraken
- Mezzabarba MZero Overdrive Head
- Mezzabarba Skill 30 Head
- Mezzabarba Nirvana Preamp
- Mezzabarba Trinity 100W

Effects/Processor:

- Kemper profiler
- Fractal FM3
- Fractal FX8
- Fractal FM9
- TC Electronic TC2290-DT
- F-AudioLabs TAF (Marco Sfogli Signature Chorus／Delay Plugin)
- Neural DSP Mesa Boogie Mark IIC+ Suite
- Universal Audio UAFX Knuckles '92 Dual Rec Amplifier

Other Equipment:

- Mission Engineering Pedals
- Dunlop DVP4
- Line 6 G30 Wireless
- BOSS WAZA Tube Amp Expander
- Suhr Reactive Load IR
- Live Play Rock: Marco Sfogli KEMPER PACK Signature
- 412 Mezzabarba MZero "69 Cab G12M20 & G12M25 IR Cab Pack"
- Boutique Tones: "BT Marco Sfogli" Official Tone Pack
- Elixir Electric Nickel Plated Steel Optiweb Coating Super Light 09-46

=== On records ===
- James LaBrie "Elements of Persuasion" - Mesa Boogie Dual Rectifier 2ch - Mesa Boogie Mark III blue stripes - Mesa Boogie Tremoverb
- Alex Argento "EGO" - Mesa Boogie Triaxis/2:90 - Boss GT-6 - Roland Microcube
- The Alchemist II - Mesa Boogie Triaxis
- Magni Animi Viri "Heroes Temporis" - Mesa Boogie Triaxis/2:90 - Mesa Boogie Studio Preamp/2:90
- Jordan Rudess "The Road Home" - Native Instruments Guitar Rig - was also the last record which featured the Music Man JP guitar
- John Macaluso "The Radio Waves Goodbye" - Mesa Boogie Triaxis/2:90 - Lexicon MPXG2
- Shadrane "Temporal" - Boss GT-6
- Marco Sfogli "There's Hope" - Mesa Boogie Studio Preamp/Triaxis/2:90 - Mesa Boogie Lonestar - Native Instruments Guitar Rig - Boss GT-6 - IK Multimedia Amplitube - Roland Microcube - Behringer VAmp2 - Lexicon MPXG2
- Project Damage Control "Mechanism" - Mesa Boogie Studio Preamp/2:90 - Digidesign Eleven - Zoom 9002 Pro - Fractal Audio Axe FX Ultra
- Adam Nitti "Liminal" - Mesa Boogie Lonestar - Zoom 9002 Pro
- Utopia "Ice and Knives" - Fractal Audio Axe FX Ultra
- James LaBrie "Static Impulse" - Mesa Boogie Dual Rectifier - Engl Fireball - Fractal Audio Axe FX Ultra
