= Keep It to Yourself (album) =

- Cover art by Dave McKean

Studio album by MullMuzzler
- Released: August 24, 1999
- Recorded: M.I.Studios, Los Angeles; Town Music Studios, Toronto
- Genre: Progressive metal
- Length: 52:04
- Label: Magna Carta
- Producer: James LaBrie

MullMuzzler chronology
Keep It to Yourself (1999)	Mullmuzzler 2 (2001)

Professional ratings
Review scores
Source	Rating
AllMusic	3/5 stars

Keep It to Yourself is the debut album by MullMuzzler (a band formed by Dream Theater lead singer James LaBrie). It was released on August 24, 1999.

== Track listing ==
No.	Title	Length
1.	"His Voice"	3:43
2.	"Statued"	3:23
3.	"Shores of Avalon"	7:51
4.	"Beelzebubba"	5:20
5.	"Guardian Angel"	7:27
6.	"Sacrifice"	5:14
7.	"Lace"	4:14
8.	"Slow Burn"	6:20
9.	"As a Man Thinks"	8:11

== Personnel ==
- James LaBrie – lead and backing vocals
- Mike Keneally – guitars
- Matt Guillory – keyboards, piano
- Mike Mangini – drums
- Bryan Beller – bass
- Trent Gardner – trombone, keyboards, programming, spoken word
- Wayne Gardner – horns
- Michael Stewart – trumpet, alto sax

Production

- Produced by James LaBrie
- Engineered and mixed by Terry Brown
