= The Towers of Avarice =

Studio album by Zero Hour
- Released: March 6, 2001
- Genre: Progressive metal
- Length: 45:22
- Label: Sensory

Zero Hour chronology
Zero Hour (1999)	The Towers of Avarice (2001)	Metamorphosis (2003)

Professional ratings
Review scores
Source	Rating
Allmusic	3/5 stars
Powermetal.de	9.5/10
Rock Hard	9/10

The Towers of Avarice is Zero Hour's second album, and their first on the Sensory record label. The album is conceptual, with a story reminiscent of the Silent Era movie Metropolis.

The album has been called "the quintessential progressive metal album of the new millennium" by Sea of Tranquility reviewer Murat Batmaz. When asked about the production on the album, producer Dino Alden stated that "Zero Hour has always been quite disciplined and they are very well rehearsed before they come into the studio. They always make pre-production recordings on their own and they work very hard at getting the arrangement that they want for each song."

== Track listing ==
1. "The Towers of Avarice" – 7:52
2. "The Subterranean" – 4:11
3. "Stratagem" – 8:06
4. "Reflections" – 3:56
5. "Demise and Vestige" – 15:47
6. "The Ghosts of Dawn" – 5:30

== Credits ==
- Erik Rosvold - vocals, keyboards
- Jasun Tipton - guitars, keyboards
- Troy Tipton - bass
- Mike Guy - drums
- Travis Smith - Artwork
