= Darkane =

Swedish metal band

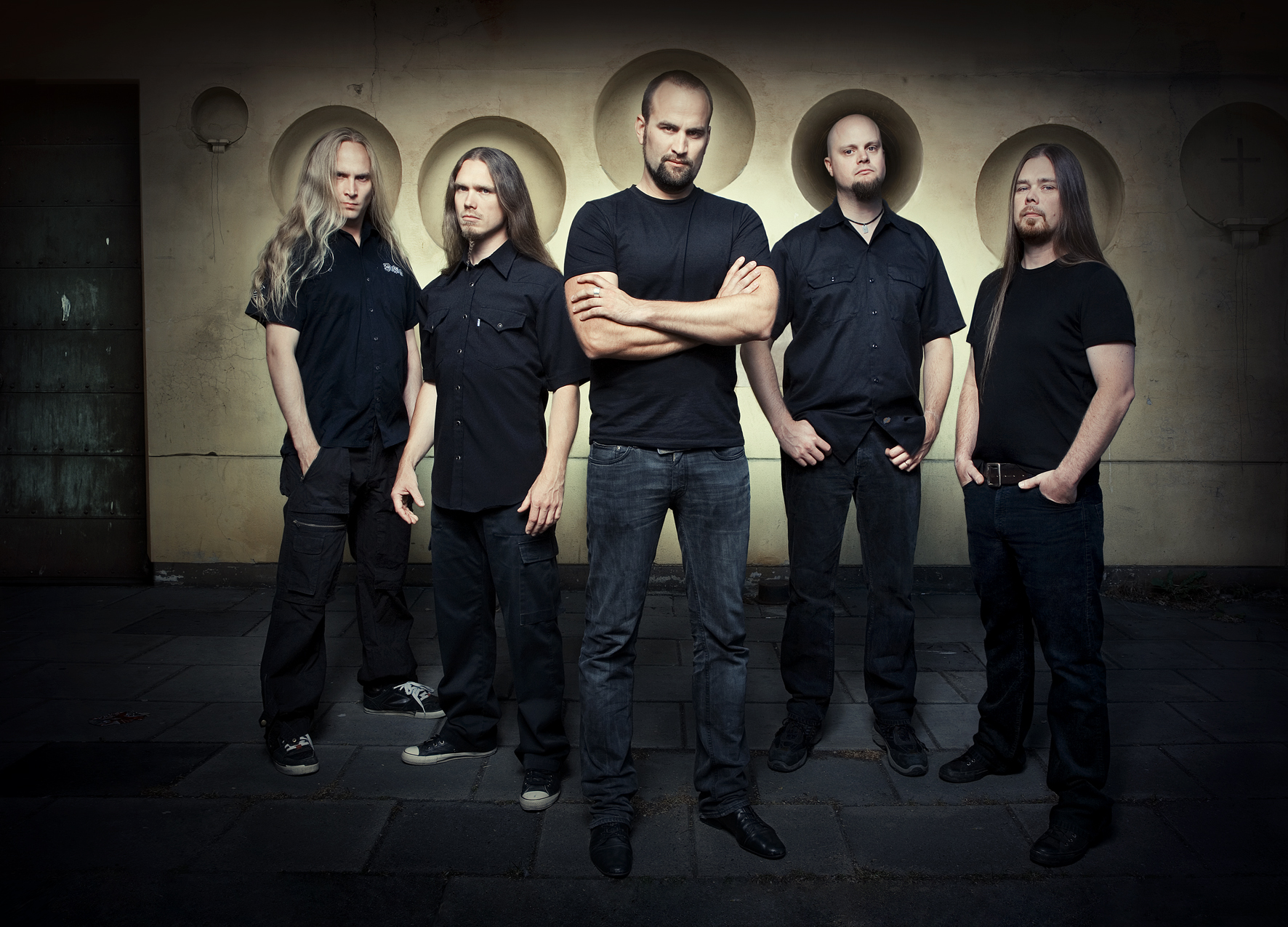

Background information
- Origin: Helsingborg, Sweden
- Genres: Melodic death metal, thrash metal
- Years active: 1998–present
- Label: Nuclear Blast
- Website: darkane.com

Darkane is a Swedish thrash metal/melodic death metal band formed in Helsingborg in 1998. Their music contains acoustic interludes and symphonic features, such as the in-studio use of synthesizers and occasionally full orchestras and choir singing. The name "Darkane" is a portmanteau of "dark" and "arcane".

== History ==
=== Formation and Rusted Angel (1998–2000) ===
Former Agretator guitarist Christofer Malmström and drummer Peter Wildoer formed Darkane. They recorded a two-song demo in 1998. Darkane signed with War Music. Bassist Jörgen Löfberg, guitarist Klas Ideberg, and vocalist Bjorn "Speed" Strid completed the lineup. Already Soilwork's singer, Strid was unable to divide his time and left Darkane. After several months without a vocalist, he was replaced with Lawrence Mackrory, whom producer Daniel Bergstrand recommended to the band.

Mackrory sang on the debut album, Rusted Angel, and performed several live dates with the band later that year. Due to other commitments, Mackrory was unable to tour with the band in early 1999, and was replaced with Andreas Sydow, who had been in a cover band with Malmström years earlier.

=== Insanity and Expanding Senses (2001–2003) ===
After playing many festivals and shows for the next months, the band signed with Nuclear Blast and recorded their second album. These sessions were challenging. Electrical storms, floods, and equipment malfunctions caused issues during the production of the album, which was named Insanity as a result.

After more European touring and their first North American show in 2001, the band began work on their third album, Expanding Senses, released in 2002.

=== Layers of Lies (2004–2007) ===
Darkane toured extensively following the release of Expanding Senses, and by early 2004 had almost an entire album's worth of songs written. However, at that time, drummer Peter Wildoer suffered a wrist injury, and began experiencing severe wrist pain. The band went on hiatus to allow Wildoer to recover. During this hiatus, guitarist Christofer Malmström released a solo album (Non Human Level) which was a compilation of unreleased songs he had written from 1998 to 2004. Guitarist Klas Ideberg spent time working with his side project Terror 2000.

By late 2004, Wildoer's injury had healed, and the band reconvened to record their fourth album, Layers of Lies, released in May 2005. After more extensive touring, the band started putting together the live compilation DVD Layers of Live, however, this effort would take several years, not being released until 2010. On 13 August 2007, vocalist Andreas Sydow decided to end his tenure with Darkane. This led to the arrival of former Construcdead and The Defaced vocalist, Jens Broman on 25 October 2007.

=== Demonic Art and switching singers (2008–2011) ===
On 6 October 2007 it was announced that Darkane was writing new material for their fifth studio album Demonic Art, which was later released on 24 October 2008. Peter Wildoer posted this message on his website:

"This coming winter we will start recording Darkane's fifth record. We have about nine songs ready. We were hoping to enter the studio earlier but in typical Darkane bad luck, our studio got flooded and badly damaged. So now we're looking for a new location for the studio and as soon as we find that we need to rebuild the studio which takes a lot of time. Hopefully we will start recording around Christmas (fingers crossed). In some weeks, we'll start working on the mix of the upcoming Darkane DVD. I just hope the DVD will be released early next year".

Darkane's only full-length DVD was shot in May 2006 in the band's hometown of Helsingborg, Sweden.

On 6 August 2011 it was announced that vocalist Jens Broman was leaving the band due to personal issues. He was replaced by former Darkane vocalist Lawrence Mackrory, who appeared on the debut album, Rusted Angel.

=== The Sinister Supremacy (2012–present) ===
On 30 July 2012, it was announced that Darkane was back in the studio recording their sixth studio album, which they plan to release in early 2013. Once released, this will be their first studio album since 2008's Demonic Art and with Lawrence Mackrory on vocals since 1999's Rusted Angel.

The album's title The Sinister Supremacy and release date of 28 June 2013, was announced on 4 April 2013. Regarding the title, the band said: "The Sinister Supremacy is a metaphor for the evil that controls us. It's the dark part of our minds and it's inside us all. It tells us it's OK to do bad things, to hurt other people, and hurt ourselves. It guides us into making choices based on pure selfishness, and it thrives on complete chaos."

The track listing and the album cover, were revealed on 9 May 2013. The album cover was done by Carlos Holmberg (ex-Soilwork) and the cover is a Rorschach test as seen by an individual who has completely succumbed to the sinister supremacy, according to the band.

On 24 June 2022, after 9 years the band released their long-awaited follow-up to 2013's The Sinister Supremacy titled Inhuman Spirits.

On 16 May 2024, the band announced that vocalist Lawrence Mackrory had departed the band. Less than a week later, the band announced Tobiasz Derengowski as their new vocalist.

== Members ==
=== Current members ===
- Peter Wildoer – drums (1998–present)
- Christofer Malmström – lead guitar (1998–present)
- Klas Ideberg – rhythm guitar (1998–present)
- Jörgen Löfberg – bass guitar (1998–present)
- Tobiasz Derengowski – vocals (2024–present)

=== Former members ===
- Björn Strid – vocals (1998)
- Lawrence Mackrory – vocals (1998–1999, 2011–2024)
- Andreas Sydow – vocals (1999–2007)
- Jens Broman – vocals (2007–2011)

== Discography ==
=== Albums ===
- Rusted Angel (1999)
- Insanity (2001)
- Expanding Senses (2002)
- Layers of Lies (2005)
- Demonic Art (2008)
- The Sinister Supremacy (2013)
- Inhuman Spirits (2022)

=== Other releases ===
- A Tribute to Accept (cover of "Restless & Wild" by Accept)
- A Tribute to the Beast (cover of "Powerslave" by Iron Maiden)
