= The Sinister Supremacy =

Studio album by Darkane
- Released: 19 June 2013 (JPN); 28 June 2013 (EU); 2 July 2013 (US)
- Genre: Melodic death metal, thrash metal
- Length: 57:27
- Label: Prosthetic Records
- Producer: Darkane

Darkane chronology
Layers of Live (2010)	The Sinister Supremacy (2013)	Inhuman Spirits (2022)

The Sinister Supremacy is the sixth album by Darkane.

On 30 July 2012 it was announced that Darkane was back in the studio recording their sixth studio album, to be their first studio album since 2008's Demonic Art and with Lawrence Mackrory on vocals since 1999's Rusted Angel.

The album's title "The Sinister Supremacy", and release date of 28 June 2013, was announced on 4 April 2013. Regarding the title, the band said: "The Sinister Supremacy" is a metaphor for the evil that controls us. It's the dark part of our minds and it’s inside us all. It tells us it's OK to do bad things, to hurt other people, and hurt ourselves. It guides us into making choices based on pure selfishness, and it thrives on complete chaos.

The track listing and the album cover were both revealed on 9 May 2013. The album cover was done by Carlos Holmberg (ex-Soilwork) and the cover is a Rorschach test as seen by an individual who, according to the band, has completely succumbed to the sinister supremacy.

== Track listing ==
All lyrics are written by Mackrory, except where noted. All vocal melodies are composed by Mackrory.

No.	Title	Lyrics	Music	Length
1.	"Sounds of Pre-Existence"	instrumental	Ideberg, Malmström	1:45
2.	"The Sinister Supremacy"		Malmström	4:22
3.	"Mechanically Divine"		Malmström, Wildoer	4:25
4.	"Ostracized"		Ideberg	3:49
5.	"The Decline"		Ideberg, Malmström	4:42
6.	"Insurrection Is Imminent"		Malmström, Wildoer	5:28
7.	"In the Absence of Pain"	Mackrory, Malmström	Malmström, Wildoer	4:20
8.	"Humanity Defined"	Malmström	Malmström	4:05
9.	"Hate Repentance State"	instrumental	Malmström	2:32
10.	"Collapse of Illusion"	Wildoer	Ideberg	4:38
11.	"By Darkness Designed"		Ideberg	3:56
12.	"Existence Is Just a State of Mind"		Ideberg	4:54
13.	"Malicious Strain" (bonus track)	Ideberg	Ideberg	4:25
14.	"I, Author of Despair" (bonus track)	Malmström, Wildoer	Malmström, Wildoer	4:06
